= Slime Mori Mori Dragon Quest 3 =

2011 video game

Slime Mori Mori Dragon Quest 3: Daikaizoku to Shippo Dan
- Developer: Tose
- Publisher: Square Enix
- Director: Akihiro Takimoto
- Producer: Noriyoshi Fujimoto
- Designer: Shinnosuke Yamada
- Programmers: Yasutaka Tokida; Shunsuke Ito
- Artist: Akira Toriyama
- Writer: Akitaka Ikeda
- Composer: Koichi Sugiyama
- Series: Dragon Quest; Slime
- Platform: Nintendo 3DS
- Release: JP: November 2, 2011
- Genre: Action-adventure
- Modes: Single-player, multiplayer

Slime Mori Mori Dragon Quest 3: Daikaizoku to Shippo Dan is a 2011 action-adventure game by Square Enix for the Nintendo 3DS. It is a spinoff video game to the Dragon Quest series, and the third entry in the Slime subseries. The game has not seen an official English release, but a fan-made translation patch has been made available.

The story follows Surarin, a slime, who goes on a quest to retrieve his country's prized jewels (known as "Rainbow Orbs") from a group of pirates who have stolen them.

== Gameplay ==
In the game, the player controls a slime named Slarin. Unlike the first two games of the series, which were 2D games featuring tank battles, Slime Mori Mori Dragon Quest 3 features naval battles in a 3D environment. Also unlike the first two games, the goal is not to rescue one hundred kidnapped slimes, but to take back the "Rainbow Orbs", the treasure of the Slime Kingdom.

The battle mechanics are similar to the previous game in the series, Dragon Quest Heroes: Rocket Slime, with the player journeying through specific game locations, fighting enemies by either flinging the slime at enemies or by fighting naval battles by loading ammunition into the ship's guns. The game features multiplayer mode with up to four participants and uses Nintendo's Street Pass system. An online shop called Netshop, also used in Dragon Quest IX, allows players to upgrade ship parts and buy rare items with in-game currency.

== Plot ==
The protagonist, Surarin lives in Slime Kingdom. One day while he return from the sailing, his kingdom is attacked by Tails Troupe, and the "Rainbow Orbs", treasures of the state, were stolen. The Boss of the Tails Troupe spreads these orbs around the world, and sets up guards to prevent them from being taken back. Surarin and his crew sail around the world retrieving the Orbs.

== Development ==
The title was first announced on March 16, 2011, as the first Nintendo 3DS title of the series. It was released in Japan on November 2, 2011. It was later re-released as an Ultimate Hits title on December 6, 2012. In February 2012, McDonald's released its own downloadable content for the game, featuring four exclusive items that needed to be collected to form a set. The fast food chain also offered a free minigame download to anyone with a Nintendo DS called McDonald’s Slime Ship Battle DX, which if completed would entitle the player to a one-day coupon for food and drink from the chains locations.

== Reception ==
Slime Mori Mori Dragon Quest 3 sold 38,859 copies in its first week, and charted as the seventh-best selling game of the week. It sold over 108,000 copies by 2012.

The Japanese magazine Famitsu scored the game 37/40, while French media Consoles + gave it a 15/20.
