= Malroth =

Dragon Quest character

- Dragon Quest character
- Malroth in Dragon Quest II
- First game: Dragon Quest II (1987)
- Created by: Yuji Horii
- Designed by: Akira Toriyama

Malroth, known in Japan as Sidoh (Japanese: シドー, Hepburn: Shidō), is a character in the video game Dragon Quest II. He is its final boss, though he is rarely mentioned and never seen until he is fought at the end of the game. His boss battle was notable for its difficulty, particularly due to his use of the spell Fullheal, which recovered his health points in full. His design was created by Akira Toriyama.

Malroth appears as a main character in the game Dragon Quest Builders 2 as a young man with no memories, assisting the protagonist in surviving and rebuilding a world while grappling with strange voices and his inability to create things. His appearance in Dragon Quest Builders 2 earned positive reception, praised for enhancing the game and creating heartfelt moments in the game.

== Concept and creation ==
Malroth was designed by artist Akira Toriyama for Dragon Quest II. He is a god of destruction, being a monster featuring wings, multiple limbs, and a tail. The color of his scales depend on the version; they are green in Dragon Quest II and Dragon Quest IX, but blue elsewhere.

== Appearances ==
Malroth first appeared in the video game Dragon Quest II as its final boss. Throughout the game, he is only referenced, and only sometimes by name, invoked at times by the game's other villain, Hargon. Once Hargon is defeated, he surrenders his life to summon Malroth, who devours his soul before battling the heroes. Depending on the version, he may use a spell called Fullheal to recover his entire health points meter. He also appears as a guest boss in the video game Dragon Quest IX.

Malroth appears in the video game Dragon Quest Builders 2, appearing as a young man with no memories, having washed up on the Isle of Awakening. He accompanies the protagonist, a person with the ability to create things called a Builder, and Lulu, the latter who he frequently clashes with. While others can be taught to build, Malroth lacks this ability, choosing to destroy and fight enemies instead. As time passes, he hears strange voices and becomes alienated from the Builder due to scheming by a member of the Children of Hargon, leading him to part ways with the Builder. It is later discovered that his destruction powers increase as the Builder helps rebuild the world, and that the world was created by Hargon with the intent of Malroth eventually destroying it. Malroth then loses himself, becoming his monstrous form in Dragon Quest II. The Builder makes their way to Malhalla, a world made up of Malroth's flesh, and eventually defeats Malroth and returns him to normal. After saving him, it is revealed that this was part of Hargon's plan to remove the human part of Malroth, allowing the monstrous form to reach its full power. The Builder and Malroth defeat Hargon and the other Malroth, though the Builder is gravely wounded. Malroth struggles, but is eventually capable of creating a medicinal herb that saves them.

A jacket featuring Malroth was made by the company Graniph.

== Reception ==
Malroth's role in Dragon Quest Builders 2 received praise for his relationship with the protagonist

Malroth's appearance in Dragon Quest II was the subject of discussion by fans and critics. Inside Games staff discussed the Malroth boss battle in Dragon Quest II, specifically his propensity to use the spell Fullheal, which they felt made it a more challenging battle. However, the author noted how Malroth's health points (HP) were not that high, and thus Fullheal was necessary to prevent the battle from being too easy. They speculated that giving him Fullheal was a last-minute change, due in part to the fact that the Super Famicom version of the game gives him more HP, but removes Fullheal. However, they discussed how powerful and frustrating he was in Dragon Quest X, noting how he both has a lot of HP and Fullheal, and that if he uses Fullheal, players almost certainly would lose. Inside Games staff considered him an iconic Famicom boss battle. IT Media readers voted Malroth as the hardest Dragon Quest final boss, with IT Media staff similarly noting that the Fullheal skill as a core aspect of this difficulty, and speculating it was removed in the Super Famicom version to avoid confusion. They also noted how Malroth's graphics obscured the stats of one of the characters, which they found annoying. Meanwhile, IT Media staff considered him among the most difficult as well, citing his use of Fullheal as well as the fact that his stats in the Famicom version were at their maximum possible. Voice actor Nobuhiko Okamoto, while discussing famous monsters in the series, identified Malroth as one he liked, though noted the frustration of his use of Fullheal. Comedian Hollywood Zakoshisyoh called him one of his favorite monsters, identifying him as a particularly challenging battle.

Malroth received praise for his appearance in Dragon Quest Builders 2. Siliconera writer Jenni Lada appreciated how they made Malroth a much more interesting character than he was in Dragon Quest II, praising both how he makes the gameplay better, but also how strong the relationship between Malroth and the protagonist was. She discussed how caring Malroth is of the protagonist, noting she expects to see fan content about the two of them. IGN Japan writer Adeyu noted that, while they found Malroth to be an annoying character early on due to his tendency to destroy things he didn't want destroyed, but eventually grew to appreciate his presence, feeling that having Malroth as a partner created an empathetic story between the protagonist and Malroth. They noted that they felt players would struggle to not cry in the second half of the game over Malroth. Meristation writer Sergio Gonzalez appreciated Malroth, discussing how, despite having a villainous face, he was more than a companion, suggesting that he was an unforgettable character. 4gamer writer Tetsuya Inamoto appreciated the relationship between Malroth and the protagonist, calling it heart-warming, particularly when they high-five each other.
