= Puff-puff (onomatopoeia) =

Japanese sound involving breasts

A puff-puff occurring in Dragon Quest VIII, where a woman uses Slimes to simulate the act

Puff-puff (Japanese: ぱふぱふ, Hepburn: pafupafu) is an onomatopoeia that conveys a woman's breasts being rubbed in someone's face. It was first coined by Akira Toriyama, creator of Dragon Ball and lead artist of Dragon Quest, both of which featured it. In Dragon Quest, it appears in multiple games as a service a character may receive. It has been featured in a non-sexual way in Dragon Quest as well through methods such as having two Slimes being used to simulate the act, or by swapping the performer for a man, which has been criticized for lacking consent by critics. It has been censored in most games in the Dragon Quest series in English until Dragon Quest XI. Multiple video games in other series include the puff-puff scene or make references to it, including 3D Dot Game Heroes, Yakuza: Like a Dragon, Final Fantasy XIV, and Dragon Ball Xenoverse.

== History ==
Its first known use in a sexual context is in the Dragon Ball manga. (Note: Translation (from top to bottom, right to left)—Oolong (impersonating Bulma): Wouldn't it be better to have puff-puff? / Muten Rōshi: Pu... pu... puff-puff...? / Oolong: Put [your] face between [my] breasts... / Oolong: Puff-puff / Muten Rōshi: Puff-puff!!)

Puff-puff is an onomatopoeia for the sound of a woman's breasts being rubbed in another person's face. The term was first used to convey this act by Dragon Ball creator and Dragon Quest artist Akira Toriyama, having been originally featured in the Dragon Ball manga. It was featured in the first Dragon Quest game as a service offered by a woman in the town of Kol in exchange for money. In addition to being a service offered by certain characters, some characters are able to use it as a special technique in battle, such as Jessica Albert from Dragon Quest VIII in order to make enemies "swoon" over her. It was also featured in the mobile game Dragon Quest Walk as a technique.

The "puff-puff" scene has been depicted in the Dragon Quest series in various ways, including women tricking the protagonist. Most puff-puff sessions in the series do not involve women's breasts; in both Dragon Quest II and Dragon Quest III, a woman tricks the player into having it performed by a man. In Dragon Quest VIII, a woman performs a "puff-puff" massage using two Slimes, while Dragon Quest IX: Sentinels of the Starry Skies depicts the character's face being rubbed between two sheep's rear ends. Dragon Quest XI features multiple such scenes, including bungee jumping, a makeup session, and a session where it was performed by a man. The mobile game Dragon Quest Walk features a recreation of the puff-puff scene from the first Dragon Quest. It has also been featured outside Dragon Quest video games, such as a Line sticker and a Puff-Puff Room offered as a reward in a Dragon Quest III-themed escape room.

=== Censorship ===
The scene has been censored outside of Japan in multiple Dragon Quest games as well as in Dragon Ball. Dragon Quest III replaces it with a fortune teller, while Dragon Quest IV and Dragon Quest VI changes it to the non-sexual "Pufpuf therapy" and a makeup session respectively. The "Puff-Puff" technique used by Jessica and other characters was changed to be called "Pattycake". When asked by GamesRadar+ about the absence of "puff-puff" scenes from the Dragon Quest series outside Japan, Dragon Quest VI producer Noriyoshi Fujimoto expressed disappointment that these scenes could affect the games' age rating, thus causing them change the scenes to be more subtle in English. The English version of Dragon Quest XI did not have the puff-puff scenes censored.

== Impact ==
The scene has been a running joke in the Dragon Quest series. Inside Games writer Sushishi commented that, since being able to chat with the player's partner characters was not a feature yet by Dragon Quest III, the "puff-puff" scene was a valuable character interaction experience. IGN writer Jared Petty was critical of the depiction of a "puff-puff" scene in Dragon Quest XI where it turns out that a man performed the "puff-puff", arguing that it was not funny and had issues with consent. A writer for The Independent was also critical of its use, feeling that the "puff-puff" scenes in the game were forced in for "cheap, innocuous laughs" and criticized the scene discussed by Jared Petty for similar reasons. Author Daniel Andreyev discussed the various depictions of the act in the series, specifically how it evolved over time and manifested in Dragon Quest XI. He argued that its use contributes to a feeling of nostalgia, particularly for 1980s Japanese pop culture.

It has been referenced in multiple video games, including 3D Dot Game Heroes and Yakuza: Like a Dragon. In Like a Dragon, the game calls it "nigi-nigi", coming from the verb nigiru, meaning to grasp or grip. It is also called "honk-honk" in the sequel Like a Dragon: Infinite Wealth. The "puff-puff" scene is featured in Final Fantasy XIV as part of their Dragon Quest X collaboration. It also appeared in Dragon Ball Xenoverse as a gesture that can be performed by the character Master Roshi. A t-shirt with the words "puff puff" printed on it was released as part of a set of t-shirts by Zozotown, which were based on the Dragon Ball character Bulma.

== See also ==
- Cultural impact of Dragon Ball
