= Slime (series) =

- Genre: Action-adventure
- Developers: Tose; Square Enix
- Publisher: Square Enix
- Creator: Yuji Horii
- Artist: Akira Toriyama
- Composer: Koichi Sugiyama
- Platforms: Game Boy Advance, Nintendo DS, Nintendo 3DS
- First release: Slime Mori Mori Dragon Quest: Shōgeki no Shippo Dan; November 14, 2003
- Latest release: Slime Mori Mori Dragon Quest 3 November 2, 2011
- Parent series: Dragon Quest

The Slime (Note: Known as Slime Mori Mori Dragon Quest (スライムもりもりドラゴンクエス) in Japan.) series is a spinoff series of games from Dragon Quest featuring its Slime character. Three games have been released, the second of which, Dragon Quest Heroes: Rocket Slime, has been released in North America.

The series features top down adventure gameplay mixed with tank combat in the latter two titles. The plot follows Rocket, who must set out on journeys to defend his kingdom and its people from the Tails Brigade.

The series has met with positive critical reception, and despite its simplicity has been praised for its gameplay mechanics and graphic design, though sales have been mixed.

== Development ==
Yoshiki Watabe, producer of Dragon Quest VIII, thought of the idea and approached series creator Yuji Horii and together they brainstormed the games genre and style. Previously the two had discussed making a game for children while working on a port of Dragon Quest to the Game Boy, and the need for a main character appealing to children. When first conceived, the game had the blue slime protagonist wielding a sword and shield, and a gameplay test was done in this style, but was rejected because developers felt "This isn't really a slime game, this is like a blue Link". Developers then started over and asked what a slime could do that a normal character could not, from which the idea of the player stretching and launching the slime at enemies and objects came from. The developers also chose to keep humans out of the game, due to that if they did appear, they would probably just run around killing all the Slimes.

When the second game was localized for the American audience, there was concern about the slime's identifiability with the public, and so Dragon Quest was added to the title. Watabe wanted to make sure that Rocket Slime used both screens for gameplay, unlike most other DS titles that just used the top screen for maps or menus, believing that the duel screens were the console's "focus". Early in the title's life, the developers had a version of it that uses the touch screen to use Rocket's Elasto Blast technique, but scrapped the idea, due to it being too hard to control. In a search for what to do with the Nintendo DS's two screens, the developers arrived at the idea of a tank battle, and a duel view allowing players to see inside and outside the tank at once. Each character name was approved during localization by Square Enix, and names involving American cultural references had to be explained in Japanese, a task that saw many jokes cut and replaced.

Watabe said that if Dragon Quest Heroes sold well, that the developer would look into a sequel, and they may also include Nintendo Wi-Fi Connection support. In February 2011, Yuji Horii stated in an interview that a sequel was "a possibility". On March 16, 2011 a third installment in the series was announced featuring stereoscopic 3D and customizable pirate ships for combat.

== Games ==
Title	Year	Platform	Notes
Slime Mori Mori Dragon Quest: Shōgeki no Shippo Dan	JP: 2003	Game Boy Advance	Slime Mori Mori Dragon Quest: Shōgeki no Shippo Dan is a Japanese action-adventure video game published by Square Enix in 2003 for Game Boy Advance. It is part of Square Enix's Ultimate Hits (Square Enix).
Dragon Quest Heroes: Rocket Slime (Note: Released in Japan as Suraimu Morimori Doragon Kuesuto 2: Daisensha to Shippo Dan)	JP: 2005; NA: 2006	Nintendo DS	Dragon Quest Heroes: Rocket Slime is the only game in the series to be published outside of Japan.
Slime Mori Mori Dragon Quest 3	JP: 2011	Nintendo 3DS	Slime Mori Mori Dragon Quest 3 was released for the Nintendo 3DS. The game changes the tank battles of previous titles to battles at sea, and takes place in a completely 3D graphical environment. Other features include multiplayer with up to four people, SpotPass, and Wi-Fi connectivity.

== Common elements ==
In this screenshot from Rocket Slime, Rocket and two other Slimes are loading ammo into cannons on the bottom screen, and the tank they are using is seen on the left battling the tank on the right.

The blue slime is a monster from the Japanese Dragon Quest video game series. The Dragon Quest series includes over 20 types of slimes, the majority of which are present in these games. As the player rescues other slimes, more areas of the world are opened up.

Attacking enemies is done by stretching the slime and then releasing, flinging it forward. The player can also hover temporarily in the air, and bury themselves in the ground while still moving. Starting in the second title, players also engaged in battles using large tanks.

The player can also carry enemies or other slimes on his head. Enemies, of which he can carry up to three, can be thrown as an attack, while friends are required to be carried to a conveyance back home in order to count as rescued. These modes of transportation include rail carts, airships, and balloons. Occasionally slimes in the village will give quests to the player, which require them to carry enemies or items to these transport points. Picking up a certain enemy, the swordsman, allows the player to perform a sword attack which is faster than the standard stretch attack. If the player is hit by an enemy, everything they are carrying is dropped.

The slime can die if attacked too many times by enemies, as well as if the player takes too long to complete a dungeon, as in the game night falls and they are kidnapped by the Tails brigade like the rest of their village.

The plot of the games has involved the protagonist blue slime Rocket trying to retrieve something of value that has been stolen. In the first two titles he saves his family, friends and countrymen that were kidnapped by a group of monsters known as the Tails Brigade, or the Plob in the English version. The third title has Rocket traveling across the world to find seven stolen treasures.

== Reception ==
=== Sales ===
The first game in the series sold 237,652 copies as of December 14, 2003 and was the 53rd best selling game of 2003 in Japan. Its sequel, Dragon Quest Heroes: Rocket Slime, was released in Japan in 2005 and in North America in 2006. A third game in the series called Slime Mori Mori Dragon Quest 3 was released in November 2011 for the Nintendo 3DS, selling 38,859 copies its first week and charting at number seven.

=== Reception ===
The Slime series has been well received both in Japan and internationally. Slime Mori Mori Dragon Quest was the runner up for IGNs best Japanese exclusive game of 2003. Famitsu gave Dragon Quest Heroes: Rocket Slime a 34/40, grading it a 10, 8, 8, 8. It was also chosen as the number four best Nintendo DS game of 2006 by GameSpy, calling it an "engrossing" RPG and enjoyable tank battles. IGN named the game the Nintendo DS game of the month for September 2006. Famitsu awarded Slime Morimori Dragon Quest 3 a 37/40.
