= Dragon Quest Builders =

2016 video game

- Developer: Square Enix Creative Business Unit III
- Publisher: Square Enix (Note: Nintendo published the Switch version outside of Japan.)
- Director: Kazuya Niinou
- Producer: Noriyoshi Fujimoto
- Designers: Shintaro Tamai; Nobuki Ando; Suguru Ishii
- Programmers: Takashi Sugi; Naoto Uenaka; Mamoru Oyamada
- Artists: Eiichiro Nakatsu; Akira Toriyama
- Writers: Kosuke Nasu; Koya Tsukada
- Composer: Koichi Sugiyama
- Series: Dragon Quest
- Engine: PhyreEngine (Unity for Mobile and PC versions)
- Platforms: PlayStation 3; PlayStation 4; PlayStation Vita; Nintendo Switch; Android; iOS; Microsoft Windows
- Release: PlayStation 3: JP: January 28, 2016; PlayStation 4, PS Vita: JP: January 28, 2016; NA: October 11, 2016; PAL: October 14, 2016; Nintendo Switch: WW: February 9, 2018; JP: March 1, 2018; Android, iOS: WW: May 26, 2022; Microsoft Windows: WW: February 13, 2024
- Genres: Action role-playing, sandbox
- Mode: Single-player

Dragon Quest Builders (Note: Known in Japan as Dragon Quest Builders: Revive Alefgard! (Japanese: ドラゴンクエストビルダーズ アレフガルドを復活せよ, Hepburn: Doragon Kuesuto Birudāzu Arefugarudo o Fukkatsu Seyo)) is a 2016 sandbox action role-playing game developed and published by Square Enix for the PlayStation 3, PlayStation 4 and PlayStation Vita. It was ported to the Nintendo Switch in 2018, Android and iOS in 2022 and Microsoft Windows in 2024.

The game is set in Alefgard, the world of the original Dragon Quest video game, with players controlling the builder who is tasked with rebuilding the world after it was destroyed. The game features a blocky aesthetic style, with gathering and building elements similar to games such as Minecraft. A sequel, Dragon Quest Builders 2, was released in 2018.

== Gameplay ==
Players build towns out of blocks; the town gains levels based on how much it has been built up. The player can also build a selection of rooms that contribute to the level of the base. There is also a day/night cycle, with stronger monsters appearing at night. Monsters such as Slime and Dragon from the original Dragon Quest appear in the game. The player has a health bar, and must eat food over time, similar to Minecraft.

== Plot ==
The game is set in Alefgard, the world of the original Dragon Quest. The game is based on a parallel ending of Dragon Quest: before the final battle, the hero accepted the evil Dragonlord's suggestion - each rules a half of the world. The deal turned out to be a trap, leading to the hero's defeat and allowing the land to be dominated by monsters. With time passing by, a new builder (the player character) appears to revive the desolate world for the next hero. Players gather "material" from all over the world in order to rebuild the land of Alefgard from scratch.

== Development ==
The game designers wanted to make an open sandbox game combined with an RPG's purposeful story-driven plot, and since Dragon Quest has always been known for its "pick up and play" accessibility it seemed like the right combination. The original Dragon Quest video game's plot was chosen for its relative simplicity compared to later titles in the series to make the game as accessible as possible to new players.

Release in the west on the PlayStation Vita was chosen so that whether players had busy lives or had time to dedicate to the game, they could enjoy the title. Producer Noriyoshi Fujimoto has said that Sony Interactive Entertainment's multiplatform PhyreEngine was chosen for ease of development across multiple PlayStation consoles. Protagonists were designed by Akira Toriyama, with Etrian Odyssey creator Kazuya Niinou serving as the game's director. Part of the release was to "test the waters" for a big game release like Dragon Quest XI.

== Release ==
‘’Builders’’ was initially announced in July 2015 to be under development for PlayStation 3, PlayStation 4 and PlayStation Vita. Media speculation from when the game was first announced was that Dragon Quest Builders would be a Dragon Quest version of Minecraft, and IGN compared the game to Dark Cloud (2000).

The game was released in Japan on January 28, 2016. PlayStation 4 and PlayStation Vita versions were released in North America, Europe, and Australia in October 2016. An "Ultimate Hit" version was released in Japan on December 1, 2016. It was also released for the Nintendo Switch in North America and PAL territories on February 9, 2018, and in Japan on March 1, 2018. Nintendo handled the publishing of the game on the Switch in the Western territories. It was released on PC on February 13, 2024.

== Reception ==
Reception

Aggregate scores
Aggregator	Score
Metacritic	PS4: 83/100; NS: 81/100
OpenCritic	88% recommend (Note: Based on 123 reviews)

Review scores
Publication	Score
Famitsu	36/40
GameSpot	8/10
IGN	8.9/10
TouchArcade	3.5/5

Famitsu's panel of four reviewers all rated it a 9, giving the game an overall rating of 36 out of 40. IGN awarded it 8.9 out of 10, saying "Dragon Quest Builders admirably mixes the series' RPG traditions with Minecraft." GameSpot awarded it 8.0 out of 10, saying "The excellence of Dragon Quest Builders illustrates the versatility of this 30-year-old franchise as much as it speaks to the engrossing appeal of Minecraft-inspired creation." Kotaku listed it as one of 2016's top ten games, describing it as "an incredible RPG more akin to Actraiser" and "way better than Minecraft could ever be." During the 20th Annual D.I.C.E. Awards, the Academy of Interactive Arts & Sciences nominated Dragon Quest Builders for "Handheld Game of the Year" and "Family Game of the Year".

=== Sales ===
The game sold over half a million copies in the first few days of its release. It sold 700,000 copies in Japan across all three platforms. In November 2016, worldwide sales surpassed 1.1 million copies.

== Sequel ==
A sequel, Dragon Quest Builders 2, was released for the Nintendo Switch and PlayStation 4 in Japan on December 20, 2018, and worldwide on July 12, 2019. It includes cooperative gameplay for up to four players, and had developmental assistance from Koei Tecmo's studio Omega Force.
