= Dragon Quest Builders 2 =

2018 video game

- North American Nintendo Switch box art
- Developers: Square Enix; Omega Force
- Publisher: Square Enix (Note: Nintendo published the Switch version outside of Japan.)
- Directors: Kazuya Niinou; Takuto Edagawa
- Producers: Noriyoshi Fujimoto; Takuma Shiraishi; Tomohiko Sho
- Designer: Mari Takahashi
- Programmer: Yoshinao Yamagishi
- Artists: Marina Ayano; Yoshikazu Takenouchi; Akira Toriyama
- Writer: Koya Tsukada
- Composer: Koichi Sugiyama
- Series: Dragon Quest
- Platforms: Nintendo Switch; PlayStation 4; Windows; Xbox One
- Release: Nintendo Switch, PS4: JP: December 20, 2018; WW: July 12, 2019; Windows: WW: December 10, 2019; Xbox One: WW: May 4, 2021
- Genres: Action role-playing, sandbox
- Modes: Single-player, multiplayer

Dragon Quest Builders 2 (Note: Known in Japan as Dragon Quest Builders 2: God of Destruction Shidō and the Empty Island (Japanese: ドラゴンクエストビルダーズ2 破壊神シドーとからっぽの島, Hepburn: Doragon Kuesuto Birudāzu 2 Hakai-shin Shidō to Karappo no Shima)) is an action role-playing sandbox game co-developed by Square Enix and Koei Tecmo's Omega Force and published by Square Enix. The sequel to Dragon Quest Builders, it was released for the Nintendo Switch and PlayStation 4 in Japan in December 2018 and worldwide in July 2019, for Windows in December 2019, and for the Xbox One in May 2021. The game shipped over a million copies by August 2019 and received generally favorable reviews from critics.

== Gameplay ==
Screenshot showing a party of four in the overworld

Dragon Quest Builders 2 is an action role-playing sandbox game as opposed to the Dragon Quest series' typical turn-based style. The games hack-and-slash combat system features two moves; A standard attack, and a "Spinning Slice". The game features the ability for players to find materials and use them to construct buildings and other equipment. New features not found in the previous game include a fast-travel function based on a retro-style map, an optional first-person perspective, underwater exploration, and gliding.

Unlike the first Dragon Quest Builders, the game allows for up to four players to play together cooperatively via online play, as well as wireless play on the Switch version. Players are also able to transfer their game data between compatible game consoles and will gain a special bonus for doing so. Players can visit other players' worlds even on other gaming platforms, though they cannot alter them. They can also share photos made with the in-game photo mode and building plans by posting on a cross-platform bulletin board.

== Plot ==
Dragon Quest Builders 2 takes place some time after the events of Dragon Quest II, and centers around a group called the Children of Hargon, who seek revenge for the defeat of Hargon and Malroth by the descendants of Erdrick, by ensuring that all builders are eliminated and that no one be allowed to create anything. Players control either a male or female builder, known as the Hero, who is captured by this group along with all other builders in the world on a ship. The player character escapes, washing up on the Isle of Awakening, where they meet a person named Malroth, who has no memory of his past. Malroth aids the player-character in improving their building powers. After visiting a number of different islands and helping the residents there cast off the beliefs that creation and building are wicked, it is discovered that the world they inhabit is an illusion created by Hargon to protect the soul of the defeated Master of Destruction, none other than Malroth. After a falling out, Malroth abandons the others and the Hero must go after him in an apocalyptic world. After confronting Hargon the hero must battle the monstrous true form of Malroth, but the human side of him resists and allows the Hero to defeat and rescue him. Destroying Hargon and the monstrous form of Malroth together, the Hero and human Malroth return to their friends and sustain the world permanently with their combined powers now that Malroth has learned to build as well.

== Development ==
Due to the sales success of Dragon Quest Builders and players requests for features that were too big to add to the game, Square Enix decided to make a sequel. For a time, developers were not sure of the direction to take the sequel, or how much to change, but Yuji Horii reminded them that sequel buyers liked the original game and would be disappointed if it was completely different. Another development challenge was training the games characters to perceive what players were doing and respond accordingly.

Of the many requests, four player multiplayer, the ability to build higher, the circulation of water from higher locations were all requested. One result was that developers tripled the height of buildings for Dragon Quest Builders 2. Developers also discussed expanded multiplayer where players don't just play with each other, but create a kind of playground.

For this installment, Square Enix enlisted the services of longtime partners Koei Tecmo Games (through their Omega Force studio) to assist with the game's action sequences, as well as improve several aspects of gameplay and audio, among other things.

=== Release ===
Dragon Quest Builders 2 first released for Nintendo Switch and PlayStation 4 in Japan on December 20, 2018, and in North America and Europe on July 12, 2019. A playable English demo was released on June 27, 2019. A Windows version was released on December 10, 2019, via Steam, and includes all previous downloadable content for free. An Xbox One and Windows 10 version was released on May 4, 2021. It also includes the previous downloadable content, as well as cross-progression through Xbox Play Anywhere. It was added to the Xbox Game Pass service on the same day.

== Reception ==
Reception

Aggregate scores
Aggregator	Score
Metacritic	PS4: 86/100; NS: 85/100; PC: 85/100
OpenCritic	92% recommend (Note: Based on 120 reviews)

Review scores
Publication	Score
Destructoid	7.5/10
Famitsu	37/40
Game Informer	9/10
GameRevolution	4/5
GamesRadar+	5/5
IGN	8.8/10
Nintendo Life	8/10
Nintendo World Report	9.5/10
Pocket Gamer	4/5
Shacknews	7/10
USgamer	4.5/5

Dragon Quest Builders 2 received "generally favorable reviews" according to review aggregator website Metacritic. By August 2019, the game had shipped 1.1 million copies worldwide. It gained a passionate fanbase as well.

=== Awards ===
Year	Award	Category	Result	Ref.
2019	Japan Game Awards	Award for Excellence	Won	
2019	2019 Golden Joystick Awards	Nintendo Game of the Year	Nominated	
2020	23rd Annual D.I.C.E. Awards	Family Game of the Year	Nominated	
