= Slime Mori Mori Dragon Quest =

2003 video game

- Japanese box art
- Developer: Tose
- Publisher: Square Enix
- Director: Takumi Hosoyama
- Producer: Yoshiki Watabe
- Designer: Shinnosuke Yamada
- Programmer: Atsuo Higuchi
- Artist: Akira Toriyama
- Composer: Koichi Sugiyama
- Series: Dragon Quest
- Platform: Game Boy Advance
- Release: JP: November 14, 2003
- Genre: Action-adventure
- Modes: Single-player, multiplayer

Slime Mori Mori Dragon Quest: Shōgeki no Shippo Dan is a 2003 action-adventure game developed by Tose and published by Square Enix for the Game Boy Advance. It is a spinoff video game to the Dragon Quest series, and the first entry in the Slime subseries.

== Gameplay ==
In the game, the player controls a Slime named Surarin in an overhead perspective. The player can attack enemies by stretching its shape and then releasing, flinging itself forward. The player can also have Surarin hover temporarily in the air, and bury itself in the ground while still moving.

The player can also carry enemies or other slimes on his head. Enemies, of which he can carry up to three, can be thrown as an attack, while friends are required to be carried to a conveyance back home in order to count as rescued. These modes of transportation include rail carts, airships, and balloons. Occasionally slimes in the village will give quests to the player, which require them to carry enemies or items to these transport points. Picking up a certain enemy, the swordsman, allows the player to perform a sword attack which is faster than the standard stretch attack. If the player is hit by an enemy, everything they are carrying is dropped.

== Plot ==
The story of the game follows a blue slime trying to save his friends and family that were kidnapped by a group of monsters called the Tails Brigade.

== Development ==
Producer Yoshiki Watabe thought of the idea and approached series creator Yuji Horii and together they brainstormed the games genre and style. Previously the two had discussed making a game for children while working on a port of Dragon Quest to the Game Boy, and the need for a main character appealing to children. When first conceived, the game had the blue slime protagonist wielding a sword and shield, and a gameplay test was done in this style, but was rejected because developers felt "This isn't really a slime game, this is like a blue Link". Developers then started over and asked what a slime could do that a normal character couldn't, from which the idea of the player stretching and launching the slime at enemies and objects came from.

== Reception ==
Slime Mori Mori Dragon Quest sold 237,652 copies as of December 14, 2003 and was the 53rd best selling game of 2003 in Japan.Slime Mori Mori Dragon Quest was the runner up for IGN's best Japanese exclusive game of 2003, praised for its unique control scheme and fun story.
