= Dragon Quest Heroes =

Dragon Quest Heroes may refer to:

- Dragon Quest Heroes: Rocket Slime, a 2005 action-adventure video game and the second game in the Slime series of spinoff Dragon Quest games.
- Dragon Quest Heroes: The World Tree's Woe and the Blight Below, a 2015 action role-playing video game spinoff of the Dragon Quest series.
