= Dragon Quest =

Japanese video game franchise

- Genre: Role-playing
- Developers: Chunsoft (I–V); Heartbeat (VI–VII); Level-5 (VIII–IX); Square Enix (IX–XI, Dragon Quest Builders); ArtePiazza (remakes); Tose, other (spin-offs)
- Publisher: Square Enix (formerly Enix)
- Creator: Yuji Horii
- Artist: Akira Toriyama
- Composer: Koichi Sugiyama
- Platforms: Android; Arcade; Game Boy Advance; Game Boy Color; iOS; Mobile Phone; MSX; NES; Nintendo DS; Nintendo 3DS; Nintendo Switch; Nintendo Switch 2; PlayStation; PlayStation 2; PlayStation 3; PlayStation 4; PlayStation 5; PlayStation Vita; Stadia; Super NES; Wii; Wii U; Windows; Xbox One; Xbox Series X/S
- First release: Dragon Quest; May 27, 1986
- Latest release: Dragon Quest VII Reimagined; February 5, 2026
- Spin-offs: Mystery Dungeon; Dragon Quest Monsters; Slime; Dragon Quest Heroes; Dragon Quest Builders

Dragon Quest, (Note: Japanese: ドラゴンクエスト, Hepburn: Doragon Kuesuto) previously published as Dragon Warrior in North America until 2005, (Note: Due to the inconsistent usage by sources since Square Enix obtained the naming rights to Dragon Quest in North America, Dragon Quest has been used by sources to refer to games released solely under the Dragon Warrior title. For this article, the title Dragon Quest is used in preference to Dragon Warrior except when talking about those specific North American releases.) is a series of role-playing video games created by Japanese game designer Yuji Horii (Armor Project), character designer Akira Toriyama (Bird Studio), and composer Koichi Sugiyama (Sugiyama Kobo) and published by Square Enix (formerly Enix). Since its inception, development of games in the series have been outsourced to a plethora of external companies until the tenth installment, with localized remakes and ports of later installments for the Nintendo DS, Nintendo 3DS, and Nintendo Switch being published by Nintendo outside of Japan. With its first game published in 1986, there are eleven main-series games, along with numerous spin-off games. In addition, there have been numerous manga, anime and novels published under the franchise, with nearly every game in the main series having a related adaptation.

The series introduced a number of features to the genre and has had a significant impact on the development of other role-playing games. Installments of the series have appeared on various computers, consoles, handheld devices, and mobile phones. Early in the series, the Dragon Quest games were released under the title Dragon Warrior in North America to avoid trademark conflict with the unrelated tabletop role-playing game DragonQuest. Square Enix did not register the Dragon Quest trademark for use in the United States until 2002.

The basic premise of most Dragon Quest games is to play a hero (actually named "Hero" in spinoff fiction, but in all games, the player is able to name their hero) who is out to save the land from peril at the hands of a powerful evil enemy, with the hero usually accompanied by a group of party members. Common elements persist throughout the series and its spinoff games: turn-based combat; recurring monsters, including the Slime, which became the series' mascot; a text-based menu system; and random encounters in most of the main series.

All games in the series as of 2024 involve scenario writer and game designer Yuji Horii, and prior to their deaths, character designer Akira Toriyama and music composer Koichi Sugiyama have handled their respective roles on most games in the series. The original concepts, used since the first game, took elements from the Western role-playing games Wizardry and Ultima. A core philosophy of the series is to make the gameplay intuitive so that players can easily start playing the games. The series features a number of religious overtones which were heavily censored in the NES versions outside of Japan.

Dragon Quest has been both critically and commercially successful. Dragon Quest VIII in particular is regarded as one of the greatest video games of all time, and the series has sold more than 100 million copies worldwide, making it one of the best-selling video game franchises of all time.

== Media ==
=== Games ===
The first installment of the franchise was released in Japan on May 27, 1986, titled with the name "Dragon Quest". Since 1986, the franchise has featured eleven games within the main series, as well as several spin-off games, and also two animated productions.

==== Main series ====
Release timeline
1986	Dragon Quest
1987	II: Luminaries of the Legendary Line
1988	III: The Seeds of Salvation
1989
1990	IV: Chapters of the Chosen
1991
1992	V: Hand of the Heavenly Bride
1993–1994
1995	VI: Realms of Revelation
1996–1999
2000	VII: Fragments of the Forgotten Past
2001–2003
2004	VIII: Journey of the Cursed King
2005–2008
2009	IX: Sentinels of the Starry Skies
2010–2011
2012	X: Awakening of the Five Tribes Online
2013–2016
2017	XI: Echoes of an Elusive Age
TBA	XII: Beyond Dreams

The first four Dragon Quest installments were released for the Famicom and Nintendo Entertainment System in Japan and North America, respectively. The first two installments were released in Japan on the Famicom and ported that same year to the MSX; all four games have been remade for newer systems. Dragon Quest was first released in Japan on May 27, 1986, and in North America as Dragon Warrior in August 1989. Dragon Quest II Akuryō no Kamigami was released in Japan in 1987 and in North America in 1990 as Dragon Warrior II. Dragon Quest III Soshite Densetsu e... was released in Japan in 1989 and North America as Dragon Warrior III in 1992. Dragon Quest IV was released in Japan in 1990 and in North America in 1992 as Dragon Warrior IV. A 2001 Japanese PlayStation remake of Dragon Warrior IV scheduled for the North American market was never released. The Nintendo DS remake of Dragon Quest IV was released in North America, Europe, and Australia under its original translated title; the European release removed the number from the title.

Two games were released for the Super Famicom: Dragon Quest V in 1992 and Dragon Quest VI in 1995; both have been re-released on newer systems. Dragon Quest V was originally scheduled for release in North America but was canceled amid rumors that Enix had given up on the American market. No official reason was ever given. The Nintendo DS remakes were released in North America with Dragon Quest V also being released in Europe and Australia, the latter without the numbering. One game was released for the PlayStation: Dragon Quest VII: Eden no Senshi-tachi in 2000 in Japan and 2001 in North America under the title Dragon Warrior VII. Dragon Quest VIII: Journey of the Cursed King was released for the PlayStation 2 in 2004 in Japan, 2005 in North America, and 2006 in Europe and Australia, again without the number in the title for Europe. Dragon Quest VIII was the first game in the series to be released in North America under the title of Dragon Quest, and the first European release of a main series game. Dragon Quest IX, the only game in the series initially released on the Nintendo DS, was originally released in 2009 in Japan, and in 2010 in North America, Europe, and Australia. Dragon Quest X was announced for the Wii in December 2008. In September 2011, Square Enix announced that Dragon Quest X would also be released on the Wii U, with Nintendo 3DS connectivity. It is the first MMORPG in the series, and the only numbered Dragon Quest game not released outside Japan. Dragon Quest XI was released in Japan on July 29, 2017, and worldwide on September 4, 2018.

Dragon Quest XII: The Flames of Fate was announced in 2021. According to Horii, the game would have a darker tone, feature more meaningful choices, and overhaul the traditional Dragon Quest turn-based combat. On May 27, 2026, Horii and executive producer Yosuke Saito announced that development on The Flames of Fate had been halted, with XII's development being entirely restarted from scratch. The new version of the game was unveiled as Dragon Quest XII: Beyond Dreams. Dragon Quest XII will be the first mainline title released after the deaths of series music composer Koichi Sugiyama and character designer Akira Toriyama who had been involved with the series since its inception.

==== Spin-offs ====
The franchise includes several spin-off games, including the Dragon Quest Monsters RPG. The series has also inspired arcade games such as the Japanese Dragon Quest: Monster Battle Road, where players compete for real-life cards with monster data that the arcade game issues to the players through a slot on its front. The latter is the only spin-off series to have none of its titles released outside Japan. The Mystery Dungeon and Itadaki Street series use characters and other elements from Dragon Quest games, and the Mystery Dungeon series has gone on to spawn its own franchise.

In 1993, Chunsoft developed a SNES game that included Torneko (a.k.a. Torneko Taloon), a character that first appeared in Dragon Quest IV. The roguelike game Torneko no Daibōken: Fushigi no Dungeon continues Torneko's story from Dragon Quest IV as he attempts to make his store famous, venturing into mysterious dungeons to retrieve items to stock his store with. The game was successful in Japan. In 2000 the direct sequel Torneko: The Last Hope was released in Japan and the United States. The gameplay is similar to the first game, though Torneko: The Last Hope is considered easier to play. The game sold enough copies in Japan to allow development of the second direct sequel on the PlayStation 2, Fushigi no Dungeon 3 Torneko no Daibouken. The second and third Torneko games have had remakes for the Game Boy Advance (GBA). A later game featured Yangus, a character who first appeared in Dragon Quest VIII; Dragon Quest: Young Yangus and the Mystery Dungeon follows Yangus on his adventures before he meets up with Hero in the aforementioned game. The success of Torneko no Daibōken spawned the Mystery Dungeon series that has grown to include franchises beyond Dragon Quest.

When Enix took over the Monopoly-inspired video game series Itadaki Street, the Dragon Quest franchise became an integral part of the game in its second version, Itadaki Street 2: Neon Sain wa Bara Iro ni. The first Itadaki Street, released by ASCII, did not contain elements from the Dragon Quest franchise. The fourth game in the series, Dragon Quest & Final Fantasy in Itadaki Street Special, included characters from the Final Fantasy franchise, and later versions would include characters from Mario.

Like the main series, Dragon Quest Monsters was originally released under the Dragon Warrior name in the US. The next game, Dragon Warrior Monsters 2, is the only game to be split into two versions, Cobi's Journey (Ruka's Journey in Japan) and Tara's Adventure (Iru's Adventure in Japan), named after the main player characters. Each version has slight differences, such as the monster that appear in them. Dragon Quest Monsters: Caravan Heart is a prequel to Dragon Warrior VII, following Keifer who is pulled into Torland and must find the six Orbs of Loto in order to return. The release of Dragon Quest Monsters: Joker is the first spin-off title to be released in English using the Dragon Quest name; its sequel Dragon Quest Monsters: Joker 2 was released in North America on September 19, 2011. There is also an Android title, Dragon Quest Monsters: Wanted!.

Dragon Quest has also produced a number of smaller spin-off titles. In two of them, players use their special controllers as a sword, swinging it to slash enemies and objects. Kenshin Dragon Quest: Yomigaerishi Densetsu no Ken is a stand-alone game in which the controller is shaped like a sword, and a toy shield contains the game's hardware. Dragon Quest Swords for the Wii uses the motion sensing Wii Remote as a sword. Another spin-off title, Slime Mori Mori Dragon Quest, uses the game's popular slime monster as the protagonist, and its sequel, Dragon Quest Heroes: Rocket Slime, has been translated into English. There is also a downloadable DSiWare turn-based strategy game, Dragon Quest Wars and other titles have been released in Japan for cellphones. Dragon Quest Heroes: The World Tree's Woe and the Blight Below, a PlayStation 3 and 4 game featuring the gameplay of the Dynasty Warriors series by Koei Tecmo, was released in Japan on February 26, 2015, and in North America and Europe in October 2015 as a PlayStation 4 exclusive. It later had a sequel that released on May 17, 2016, in Japan, and later came out in North America and Europe in April 2017 to the PlayStation 4 as well as PC. Dragon Quest Builders for the PS4 was released in 2016. It later had a sequel release on July 12, 2019, for the Nintendo Switch and PlayStation 4. Theatrhythm Dragon Quest is a rhythm game developed for the Nintendo 3DS. Like the Theatrhythm Final Fantasy games before it, the game allows players to play alongside various songs from the Dragon Quest franchise. In September 2019, Dragon Quest Walk, an augmented reality game, was released for Android and iOS mobile phones.

=== Other media ===
==== Novels ====
Beginning in 1988, the media franchise expanded into other media, with a number of anime, manga, and light novel adaptations. Following the success of a Dragon Quest III light novel, Enix began publishing more volumes starting from the first game in sequential order. Enix published titles from every main series game previously released by March 23, 1995, as well as the first Torneko's Mystery Dungeon game. The titles are written from a second-person perspective; the reader determines the next course of action and the stories have multiple endings.

Other printed titles released in 1989 include: Dragon Quest Monsters Story; Dragon Quest Item Story; the Dragon Quest Perfect Collection series starting with Dragon Quest Perfect Collection 1990; and the first two Dragon Quest novels by Takayashiki Hideo. All of these works have had additional titles published for different games by different authors: Hideo wrote the first four volumes spanning the first three games; Kumi Saori authored ten volumes comprising the next three games; and Hiroyuki Domon wrote three volumes for Dragon Quest VII. Starting with Shinsho Shousetsu Dragon Quest I in 2000, a new series by all three authors began publication. The authors wrote new stories for their respective series, three stories for Hideo, nine for Saori, and three for Domon; with the latter's works featuring illustrations by Daisuke Torii. Several standalone titles and audiobook titles have also been released.

==== Manga ====
Several manga based on the Dragon Quest games have been published. Riku Sanjo and Koji Inada's Dragon Quest: The Adventure of Dai started as a two-chapter one-shot entitled Gush! Gulp! in Weekly Shōnen Jump in 1989. Its success led to the three-chapter sequel, Dai o' Might!!!, which set the framework for a full serialization spanning 37 volumes. With more than 50 million copies in circulation, it is one of the best-selling manga series of all time and has been adapted into a variety of other media, including its own video games.

Dragon Quest: The Mark of Erdick (ドラゴンクエスト列伝 ロトの紋章, Dragon Quest Retsuden: Roto no Monshō; lit. 'Dragon Quest Saga: Emblem of Roto') was published in Monthly Shōnen Gangan from 1991 to 1997. Written by Chiaki Kawamata and Junji Koyanagi, with art by Kamui Fujiwara, it was collected into twenty-one volumes. Taking place between Dragon Quest III and Dragon Quest I, it was adapted into a drama CD in 1994, and an animated film that was released on April 20, 1996. As of 2019, the series had sold 21 million copies, including 400,000 copies sold overseas. It was licensed by Square Enix for English release in North America in 2025. In 2004, Kawamata, Koyanagi and Fujiwara published a sequel mini-series in Gangan YG called Emblem of Roto Returns. In December 2004, another sequel titled Emblem of Roto: To the Children who Inherit the Emblem (ドラゴンクエスト列伝 ロトの紋章 〜紋章を継ぐ者達へ〜, Dragon Quest Retsuden: Roto no Monshō: Monshō o Tsugumono-tachi e) began in Young Gangan. It ran until January 4, 2020, and was collected into thirty-four volumes. Illustrated by Fujiwara, it was initially written by Jun Eishima, until Takashi Umemura took over for volume five. On December 2, 2022, two side-stories were published in Young Gangan to celebrate the magazine's 18th anniversary, one for The Mark of Erdick and one for To the Children who Inherit the Emblem.

Aki Tomato and Masaomi Kanzaki's Dragon Quest: Maboroshi no Daichi (ドラゴンクエスト 幻の大地) was serialized in Monthly Shōnen Gangan from 1997 to 2001, and consists of fourteen volumes. It is a retelling of Dragon Quest VI with some minor changes. Fujiwara serialized Dragon Quest: Warriors of Eden (ドラゴンクエスト エデンの戦士たち) in Monthly Shōnen Gangan from 2001 to 2006. Collected into eleven volumes, the series is a retelling of Dragon Quest VII with some minor changes. In January 2026, Fujiwara began a sequel in Young Gangan titled Dragon Quest Eden.

Yuuki Nakashima's Dragon Quest: Sola in the Blue Sky (ドラゴンクエスト 蒼天のソウラ, Doragon Kuesuto Sōten no Soura) is a sidestory of Dragon Quest X supervised by Yuji Horii. It was serialized in V Jump between December 2012 and October 2022, with 20 volumes released. A sequel in the form of an illustrated short story, titled Dragon Departure, then ran for twelve chapters on the magazine's website until March 30, 2023.

Other shorter manga series have been released including several based on other games, some official 4koma strips, and a manga about the making of the original Dragon Quest game. The Road to Dragon Quest is a manga about the creators of Dragon Quest, published by Enix. The single-volume manga was released in 1990 and produced by Ishimori Productions. It focuses on the creation of the series and features series creator Yuji Horii, programmer Koichi Nakamura, composer Koichi Sugiyama, artist Akira Toriyama, and producer Yukinobu Chida. Hiro Mashima drew the one-shot Dragon Quest XI S Tōzoku-tachi no Banka (ドラゴンクエストXI S 盗賊たちの挽歌), based on Dragon Quest XI, for the October issue of V Jump, which was released on August 21, 2019. A manga adaptation of Dragon Quest Treasures titled Dragon Quest Treasures: Another Adventure Fadora no Takarajima began serialization in V Jump in November 2022. It is written by Masaki Hara with illustrations by Yoichi Amano and supervision by Horii, and was collected into three volumes.

==== Anime ====
Prior to the debut of any direct Dragon Quest adaption for television, elements of the first English-language game in the series, Dragon Warrior, were incorporated into the 1989 DIC Entertainment animated series Captain N: The Game Master, where "Dragonlord" served as a recurring antagonist to both his home-world of "Dragon's Den" and the greater dimension of "Videoland".

There are three major television series that were adapted from the games. Dragon Quest: Legend of the Hero Abel (ドラゴンクエスト ～勇者アベル伝説～, Doragon Kuesuto Yūsha Aberu Densetsu) was produced by Studio Comet and aired from December 2, 1989, to April 5, 1991, 43 episodes were broadcast before the series ended. It was supervised by Horii, with a story loosely based on Dragon Quest III. The first 13 episodes of the series were translated into English by Saban Entertainment under the title Dragon Warrior. Due to its early time slot, it was not renewed. The series was released on DVD in Japan in October 2006, with its nine volumes selling about 90,000 units by February 2007.

A second anime series, Dragon Quest: The Adventure of Dai, based on the manga of the same name, was produced by Toei Animation. It ran for 46 episodes from October 17, 1991, to September 24, 1992. A second anime adaptation of the same manga also produced by Toei Animation aired from October 3, 2020, to October 22, 2022.

On April 20, 1996, a film titled Dragon Quest Saga – The Crest of Roto was released. It was produced by Nippon Animation.

A 3DCG movie based on Dragon Quest V, Dragon Quest: Your Story, was released in Japan in August 2019.

=== Virtual reality ===
==== Dragon Quest VR ====
Dragon Quest VR (ドラゴンクエストVR) was a virtual reality team-based only arcade-style roleplaying game first released at VR ZONE SHINJUKI in Tokyo's Shinjuku district, then later hosted at VR ZONE OSAKA on September 13, 2018, and finally MAZARIA in Sunshine City, Ikebukuro, Tokyo on July 12, 2019, a series of then Bandai Namco-owned virtual reality theme park arcades. Prices for the one-time experience fee was 3,200 yen and a separate facility entrance fee was required. The experience took approximately 15 minutes.

The game's plot is based on Dragon Quest III in which a party of two Warriors, a Priest, and a Mage of either male or female genders are sent on a quest by the king to defeat the evil archfiend Baramos to return peace to the land. Players battled Slimes, Drackies, Skeletons, Shadows, Mummies, Golems, and Dragons with a variety of weapons and magic in various stages to make it to and finally defeat Baramos in the final level.

Dragon Quest VR was discontinued on March 9, 2019, before the closure of VR ZONE SHINJUKI itself on April 1 in the same year, with the experience also ending at VR ZONE OSAKA on October 25, 2020, and MAZARIA on August 31, 2020. Yuji Horii has expressed the possibility of future commercial titles being released in VR or with VR support.

==== Dragon Quest the DIVE ====
Dragon Quest the DIVE (ドラゴンクエスト the DIVE) was a virtual reality event that celebrated the series' 40th anniversary. The name was derived from the event, that allowed attendants to "dive" into the world of Dragon Quest through the use of both state-of-the-art VR headsets and moving chairs. The attraction was a joint production between Square Enix and Tohokushinsha Film Corporation.

DIVE was being held at Harajuku in Shibuya, Tokyo from June 17th through September 6th. The VR ride utilized the Meta Quest 3 headset to provide a 360 degree viewing experience and guests were being guided by a friendly healslime named Homita, created solely for this event. Additionally, there were "tactile immersion events", that allowed guests to interact with various items and creatures physically in VR, that include full-scale replicas of Erdrick's Sword, the Zenithian Sword, and the Supreme Sword of Light as well as the bodies of slimes, the fur of a Sanguini, and the mouth of a Lips to name a few. A non-VR version of the ride was also available for children under the age of 10 and those who couldn't use VR headsets.

== Common elements ==
=== Gameplay ===
Combat image from Dragon Quest III that depicts the typical battle layout and menu types that is seen in most Dragon Quest games

In most Dragon Quest games, players control a character or party of characters that can walk into towns and buy weapons, armor, and items to defeat monsters outside of the towns: on the world map or in a dungeon. However, in the original Dragon Quest, there was only one character walking on the map. In most of the games, battles occur through random monster attacks and improving the characters' levels requires players to grind. The series uses cursed items, difficult dungeons where players need to use their resources wisely to complete them, and difficult boss battles. When the party encounters monsters the view switches perspective and players are presented with several options on a menu; these turn-based menu-driven battles have become a staple of the series. Players use the menus to select weapons, magic, and other items used to attack and defeat the monsters, or can attempt to flee the fight; though characters cannot flee during a boss battle. Once the party defeats the monsters by winning the battle, each party member gains experience points in order to reach new levels. When a character gains a new level, the statistics (stats) of the character are upgraded. Winning battles also rewards players with gold which can be used to purchase items. In addition to the experience points and gold awarded for successfully defeating monsters, occasionally, items will be dropped as well that are added to the player's inventory.

In most Dragon Quest games, players must visit a church (known as a House of Healing in the NES translations) and talk to a priest or nun to save the games' progress; in Dragon Warrior, players had to talk to a king to save their progress, though the first two Dragon Quest titles for Famicom use a password save system. If the party dies in battle the group loses half of its gold and warps to the nearest save location where the hero is revived; players must then pay a priest or nun to revive their party members.

Dragon Quest features "Puff Puff" – massage girls that the player can hire with text describing their actions in some of the games; it is a pun on a Japanese onomatopoeia for a girl rubbing her breasts in someone's face, which can also be used for the general term of a girl jiggling her own breasts. In later games gags were used since breasts could not be displayed. The text descriptions were removed from some North American translations. (Note: The original NES games and the DS remakes have this removed while the PS1 and PS2 games Dragon Quest IX and GBC remakes include this.)

In Dragon Quest III, Dragon Quest VI, Dragon Quest VII, and Dragon Quest IX, several character classes can be chosen for the party members. Each game has its particular set of classes with typical options, including the Cleric, Fighter, Jester, Thief, Warrior, and Mage. (Note: Most of the basic classes have undergone name changes in their English translation. The Cleric class underwent several name changes. It was originally known as the Pilgrim in Dragon Warrior III and in Dragon Quest VI and Dragon Quest IX it changed to Priest; the Fighter class was changed in Dragon Quest VI and Dragon Quest IX to Martial Artist; the Jester class was originally known as Goof-off in Dragon Warrior III and was changed to Gadabout in Dragon Quest VI; the Warrior class was originally known as Soldier in Dragon Warrior III, and the translation for the Mage has alternated between Mage and Wizard, depending on the Dragon Quest title.) All the aforementioned games also include advanced classes such as the Sage. In addition, Dragon Quest VI and VII include monster classes.

In Dragon Quest IV: Chapters of the Chosen, a new collectible item known as mini medals, resembling small gold coins with a five-pointed star in the middle, was introduced; they have nothing to do with winning the game, but they can be traded with a certain character for items. Players collect them throughout the game, primarily by opening chests, breaking pots and barrels, and searching in sacks and drawers. Horii introduced them as he wanted to have something players collected that were similar to the crests and orbs in the previous Dragon Quest games but did not want to repeat the necessity for players having to collect a certain number of them before they could complete the game.

=== Characters ===
==== Monsters ====
An example of a slime

The Dragon Quest series features several recurring monsters, including Slimes, Drackies, Skeletons, Shadows, Mummies, Bags o' Laughs, and Dragons. Many monsters in the series were designed by Akira Toriyama.

Several Dragon Quest games allow the player to recruit monsters to fight alongside them. In Dragon Quest IV, a Healer monster called "Healie" can be recruited for the first chapter. Dragon Quest V and VI monsters can be selected by the player to join the player's party and fight in battles. In Dragon Quest VIII players can defeat and recruit monsters to fight in an arena.

The Slime, designed by Toriyama for use in Dragon Quest, has become the official mascot of the Dragon Quest series. Series designer Yuji Horii cited the monster as an example of Toriyama's skills, claiming it took "[artistic] power to take something like a pool of slime and use his imagination to make it a great character." A Slime is a small blue blob, shaped like a water droplet, with a face. It has appeared in every Dragon Quest game and it is usually one of the first monsters the players encounter. (Note: In every game except Dragon Quest VI the blue slime is encountered in the first overworld area with monsters—in Dragon Quest VII the first overland area has no monster encounters—the players explore.) The Slime's popularity has netted it the Slime spin-off series on handheld consoles.

==== Erdrick ====
Erdrick, known as Loto (ロト, Roto) in Japanese and in the North American remakes of the Game Boy Color versions of the first three games, is the title given to a legendary hero in the Dragon Quest series. The first three Dragon Quest games, all connected to the legend of Erdrick, comprise the Erdrick or Loto trilogy. Also known as Arusu, he is known as the hero who freed the Kingdom of Alefgard from the darkness. The chronological order of the first three Dragon Quest games is: Dragon Quest III, Dragon Quest, and Dragon Quest II.

In the first Dragon Quest game, the hero, the player character, is a descendant of Erdrick who follows in his footsteps to reach the Dragonlord's Castle and confront him. In Dragon Quest II, the heroes are also descendants of Erdrick; they explore the expanded world of Torland that includes the continent of Alefgard. Erdrick's legend in the Dragon Quest series was completed in Dragon Quest III when the King of Alefgard bestowed the "Order of Erdrick", the country's highest honor, upon the hero at the end of the game. Two of the player character's three highest-level armaments are named "Erdrick's Sword" and "Erdrick's Armor" in Dragon Quest and Dragon Quest II. Playing Dragon Quest III with the name "Erdrick" is impossible in the original release, as the game prompts the player to choose a different name for the hero. This is because the status of III in the chronological order as a prequel of the first two titles is presented as a plot twist. The Game Boy Color remakes prevent the use of the name "Loto" for the same reason.

In Dragon Quest XI, the player character is a warrior chosen by the world tree Yggdrasil to save the world of Erdrea from a being of pure evil known as "Calasmos". After Calasmos is defeated at the end of the game, Yggdrasil bestows him the title of Erdrick.

==== Torneko ====
Torneko (トルネコ, Toruneko), known as Torneko Taloon in North American English localizations, is a recurring character who first appears in Dragon Quest IV. A traveling merchant, Torneko's usual goal is to expand the inventory of his shop by procuring rare items, often by traversing dungeons and fighting monsters on his own or with his family.

The character's popularity with players led to further appearances or easter egg references in subsequent mainline sequels, as well as a starring role in 1993's Torneko no Daibōken: Fushigi no Dungeon, the inaugural entry of the long-running Mystery Dungeon video game series by Spike Chunsoft. The character's other video game appearances include two direct sequels to Torneko no Daibōken: Fushigi no Dungeon, the 2016 video game Dragon Quest Heroes II, and the Itadaki Street series.

==== Zenithia ====
Zenithia, also called Zenith Castle, Zenith, or Tenkū-jō (天空城; "Heaven Castle") in Japanese, is a floating castle that first appears in Dragon Quest IV; it is used as a descriptor for several elements in Dragon Quest IV, V and VI. Its appearance in all three games has led to the games being described as the Zenithia or Tenkū trilogy, despite different geographical layouts in each of the three games' worlds. Horii explained that a trilogy was never the intention: "Each Dragon Quest title represents a fresh start and a new story, so it seems too much of a connection between the games in the series. It could be said that the imagination of players has brought the titles together in a certain fashion."

In Dragon Quest IV, Zenithia can be accessed by climbing the tower above the entrance to the world of darkness. In Dragon Quest V Zenithia has fallen into a lake south of Lofty Peak (Elheaven in the original release), until the Golden Orb is returned leaving the castle able to move freely in the sky. In Dragon Quest VI Zenithia is sealed by Demon Lord Dhuran, and a large hole is left in its place in the "Dream World". When the Dream World returns to its natural state in Dragon Quest VI, Zenithia is the only part that remains, floating above the "real" world. In addition to the trilogy, a castle in the Dragon Quest III remakes is also called Zenith, although the layout differs from the castle in the Tenkū series. A set of crucial items in Dragon Quest IV and Dragon Quest V are known as The Zenithian Equipment (天空の装備, 伝説の武具) consisting of a sword, shield, armor and helmet. Only the legendary Hero can equip the armaments, and the stories in both games can't advance until the entire set is obtained. Outside of these two games, the sword would later go on to become a reoccurring weapon later in the series. The helmet has three appearances, the third in Dragon Quest IX.

== Development and history ==
The series' monsters, characters, and box art were designed by Toriyama. The music for the Dragon Quest series was composed by Koichi Sugiyama. In the past, main Dragon Quest games have been developed by Chunsoft, Heartbeat, ArtePiazza, Level-5 and starting with Dragon Quest X, by Square Enix for the first time. Horii's company, Armor Project, is in charge of the script and design of Dragon Quest games that were published by Enix and Square Enix.

=== Origin ===
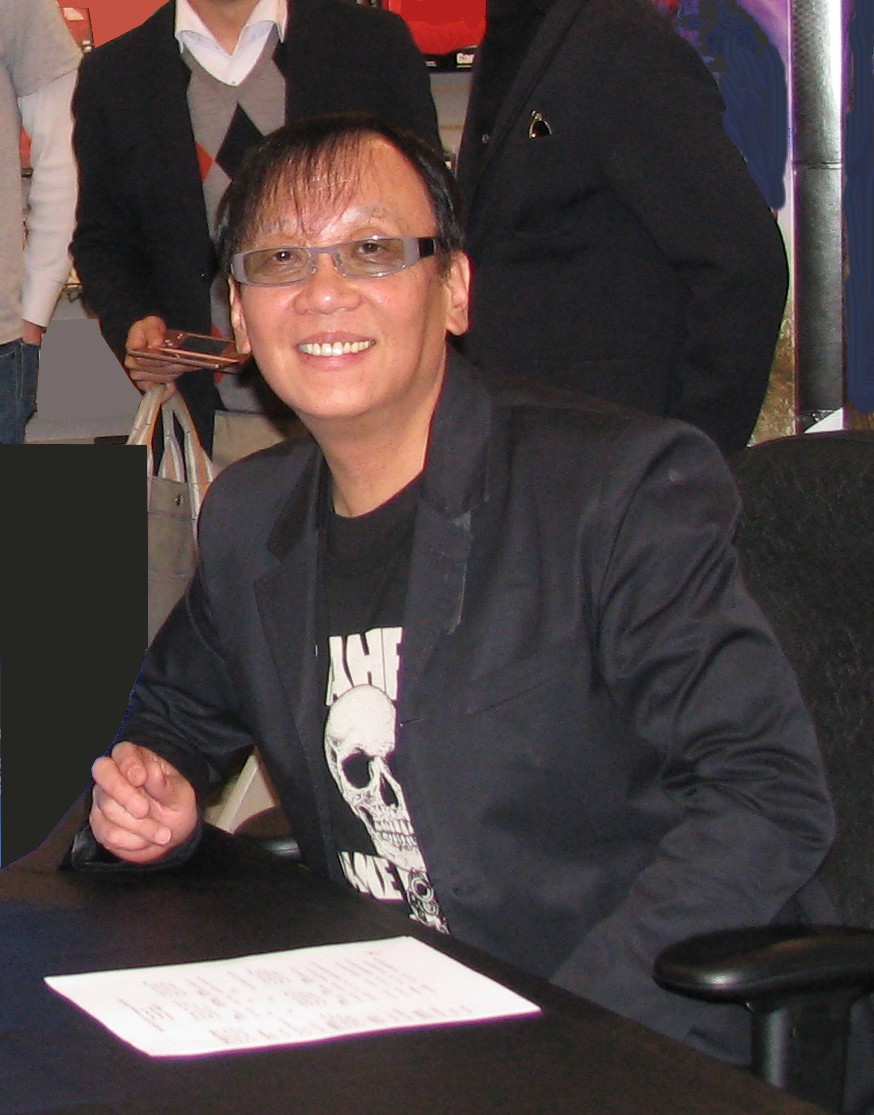
Yuji Horii, the creator of Dragon Quest series

In 1982, Enix sponsored a video game programming contest in Japan which brought much of the Dragon Quest team together, including creator Yuji Horii. The prize was a trip to the United States and a visit to AppleFest '83 in San Francisco, where Horii discovered the Wizardry video game series. The contest winners Koichi Nakamura and Yukinobu Chida, together with Horii, released the Enix NES game The Portopia Serial Murder Case. Music composer Sugiyama, known for composing jingles and pop songs, was impressed with the group's work and sent a postcard to Enix praising the game. Enix asked him to compose music for some of its games. The group then decided to make a role-playing video game that combined elements from the western RPGs Wizardry and Ultima. (Note: While Wizardry and Ultima are under the broad category of role-playing video games, they are personal computer games, not video game console games.) Horii wanted to introduce the concept of RPGs to the wider Japanese video game audience. He chose the Famicom because, unlike arcade games, players would not have to worry about spending more money if they got a "game over", and could continue playing from a save point. Horii used the full-screen map of Ultima and the battle and statistics-oriented Wizardry screens to create the gameplay of Dragon Quest. Dragon Ball creator and manga artist Akira Toriyama, who knew of Horii through the manga magazine Weekly Shōnen Jump, was commissioned to illustrate the characters and monsters to separate the game from other role-playing games of the time. The primary game designs were conceived by Horii before being handed to Toriyama to re-draw under Horii's supervision. When Horii first created Dragon Quest many people doubted that a fantasy series with swords and dungeons, instead of science fiction elements, would become popular in Japan; however, the series has become very popular there. Since then Horii has been the games' scenario director. Dragon Quest was Sugiyama's second video game he had composed for, Wingman 2 being his first. He says it took him five minutes to compose the original opening theme. His musical motifs from the first game have remained relatively intact.

The first six Dragon Quest stories are divided into two trilogies. The first three games of the series tell the story of the legendary hero known as Roto (Erdrick or Loto in some versions). Dragon Quest IV-VI are based around a castle in the sky called Zenithia, referred to as the Tenku in Japan, meaning "heaven". Games in the main series from Dragon Quest VII onwards are stand-alone games.

The early Dragon Quest games were released under the title Dragon Warrior in North America to avoid trademark conflict with the pen-and-paper role-playing game Dragon Quest, which was published by Simulations Publications in the 1980s until the company's 1982 bankruptcy and acquisition by TSR, Inc. TSR continued publishing the line as an alternative to Dungeons & Dragons (D&D) until 1987. On July 23, 2002, Square Enix registered the Dragon Quest trademark in the United States for use with manuals, video cassette tapes, and other video game software. On October 8, 2003, Square Enix filed for a more comprehensive Dragon Quest trademark, also on August 2, 2016. Dragon Quest VIII: Journey of the Cursed King became the first Dragon Quest game released outside Japan, all previous games having used the Dragon Warrior title.

Dragon Quest was not as successful outside Japan, as it was eclipsed by another RPG series, Final Fantasy. Because of Enix's closure of its North American branch in the mid-1990s, Dragon Quest V and Dragon Quest VI were not officially released in North America. No games were released in Europe prior to the spin-off Dragon Quest Monsters. With the merger of Square and Enix in 2003, Dragon Quest games were released in numerous markets. In May 2008 Square Enix announced localizations of the Nintendo DS remakes of Dragon Quest IV, V, and VI for North America and the PAL region, commonly referred to as the "Zenithia" or "Tenku trilogy". With this announcement, all the main Dragon Quest games at the time had been released outside Japan. The ninth installment was released in Japan for Nintendo DS on July 11, 2009. The North American version was released on July 11, 2010, while the European version came out on July 23, 2010. The tenth installment of the main series was released for the Wii. Nintendo has been a major publisher outside Japan for the main Dragon Quest games, publishing the first Dragon Quest game in North America, and published Dragon Quest IX worldwide outside Japan; the NDS version of Dragon Quest VI is published by Nintendo in North America.

=== Creation and design ===
At the time I first made Dragon Quest, computer and video game RPGs were still very much in the realm of hardcore fans and not very accessible to other players. So I decided to create a system that was easy to understand and emotionally involving, and then placed my story within that framework.

— Yuji Horii on the design of the first Dragon Quest

When designing Dragon Quest, Horii playtests the games to make certain the controls feel right. This includes going into meticulous details such as how fast a page opens or the way a door opens. According to Horii, "... little things like here and there the controls not feeling right and such can really grate the players' nerves if the tempo isn't right." He believes players should be able to control the game unconsciously, which is not easy to accomplish. Horii tries to design the games in such a way that players never need to read a manual nor play through a tutorial in order to figure out how to play the game, and tries to create good storylines with short dialogues. Ryutaro Ichimura, who has worked on Dragon Quest titles with Horii since Dragon Quest VIII, has implemented Horii's suggestions even when it is not obvious why his ideas will work. "[A] lot of the time when he [Horii] points these things out, we cannot see them at first, but eventually you get it."

Dragon Quest games have an overall upbeat feeling. The typical Dragon Quest plot involves the player controlling a party of heroes to defeat an ultimate evil villain, who usually threatens the world in some way. The plot-line often consists of smaller stories that involve encounters with other characters. This linear plot-line is intentional, to help ease the generally high learning curve RPGs have for those unaccustomed to them. The gameplay is designed to allow players to decide when, and whether, to pursue certain storyline paths. To ensure players continue to enjoy playing the game, no storyline path is made without some kind of reward and, to help ease players who may be apprehensive about whether they are on the right path, the distance the character has to travel to get rewarded is reduced at the beginning of the game. While the player never starts the game in a wholly non-linear way, they usually allow players to explore an open world in a non-linear manner following an early linear section of the game. Early character levels start players off with more hit points and a substantially increasing growth at later levels, although the effective bonuses of every additional level decreases.

While Toriyama would later become more widely known with the success of Dragon Ball Z in North America, when Dragon Quest was released he was relatively unknown outside Japan. While the Dragon Quest hero was drawn in a super deformed manga style, the Dragon Warrior localization had him drawn in the "West's template of a medieval hero". The trend continued through the first four games, although the artwork for weapons and armor began using more of Toriyama's original artwork for Dragon Warrior III and IV. However, while the booklets' artwork was altered, the setting and poses remained virtually identical.

The games always feature a number of religious overtones; after the first Dragon Warrior game, saving and reviving characters who have died is performed by clergy in churches. Bishops wander around the over-world of Dragon Quest Monsters and can heal wounded characters. The final enemy in some of the Dragon Quest games is called the Demon Lord; for instance in Dragon Quest VII, the Demon Lord (known as Orgodemir in that particular game) is the final boss, and there is a sidequest to battle against God. The first four Dragon Quest titles were subjected to censorship in their North American localizations, largely in keeping with Nintendo of America's content guidelines at the time that placed severe restrictions on religious iconography and mature content. When these games were remade for the Game Boy Color, most censorship was removed. The translated versions of the games have largely followed the originals since Dragon Quest VII.

For English releases in the 21st century, games usually include a number of British dialects, such as Polari and Cockney.

=== Music ===
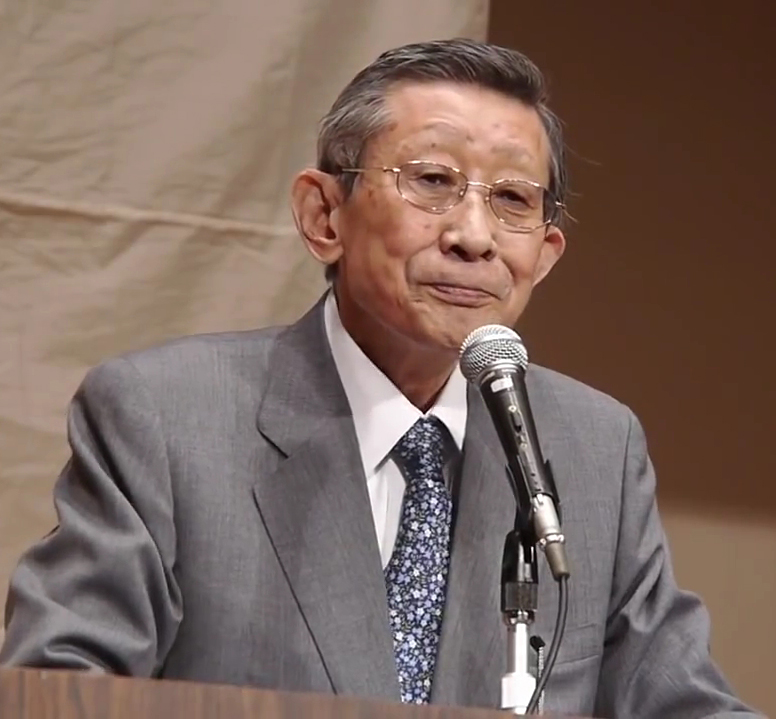
Classically trained composer Koichi Sugiyama scored the majority of Dragon Quest games until his death in 2021.

The majority of Dragon Quest soundtracks were written and orchestrated by the classically trained composer Koichi Sugiyama. In the mid-1980s, Sugiyama, who was already a well-known composer of television shows, anime, and pop songs at the time, sent a feedback questionnaire from an Enix game to the company, and, upon seeing Sugiyama's feedback, producer Yukinobu Chida contacted him to confirm that "he was the Sugiyama from television." Upon confirmation, Chida asked Sugiyama to compose a score for Dragon Quest. Sugiyama had previously composed a video game score for Wingman 2. Sugiyama stated it took him five minutes to compose the original opening theme, and noted the difficulty in adding a personal touch to the short jingles, but that his past experience with creating music for television commercials helped. According to Sugiyama, the composer has between three and five seconds to catch the audience's attention through music. The theme and other jingles for Dragon Quest have continued to be used throughout the series. He went to compose a total of over 500 tracks for the series. Sugiyama was also composing for Dragon Quest XII prior to his death in 2021.

The first album of music from the series was released in 1986 and was based on music from the first game, followed by a Symphonic Suite album for each game in the main series. The original soundtrack's "eight melodies" approach set the template for most RPG soundtracks released since then, hundreds of which have been organized in a similar manner. The original game's classical score was considered revolutionary for video game music.

Other compilations of Dragon Quest music have been released, including Dragon Quest Game Music Super Collection Vol. 1. The London Philharmonic performed many of the soundtracks, including a compilation entitled Symphonic Suite Dragon Quest Complete CD-Box. Some of the soundtracks include a second disc with the original game music, as with the Dragon Quest VI soundtrack. In 2003 SME Visual Works released Symphonic Suite Dragon Quest Complete CD-Box, featuring music from the first seven Dragon Quest games.

== Reception ==
In 2006, readers of the Japanese gaming magazine Famitsu voted on the hundred best video games of all time. Dragon Quest III was third, Dragon Quest VIII fourth, Dragon Quest VII ninth, Dragon Quest V eleventh, Dragon Quest IV fourteenth, Dragon Quest II seventeenth, Dragon Quest thirtieth, and Dragon Quest VI thirty-fourth. In 2009, Horii received a special award at the Computer Entertainment Supplier's Association Developers Conference for his work on the Dragon Quest franchise.

According to Satoru Iwata, former President of Nintendo, Dragon Quest's widespread appeal is that it is "made so that anyone can play it...and anyone can enjoy it depending on their different levels and interests." According to him, Dragon Quest is designed for anyone to pick up without needing to read the manual in order to understand it. Ryutaro Ichimura, producer at Square Enix, who has played the game since he was a child, says the Dragon Quest storylines allow players to experience a moving sense of achievement where they take the role of a hero saving the world. Horii believes the ability to appeal to larger audiences of casual gamers, while not alienating the more hardcore gamers, is due to being able to lower the initial hurdle without making it too easy. Iwata and Ichimura believe it is because the games are created in a way that allows both groups to pursue their own goals; casual gamers can enjoy the storyline and battles, but for those who want more there is still content for them to pursue.

Although the series is extremely popular in Japan, the success in Japan was not replicated in North America until the 2005 release of Dragon Quest VIII. Despite the first four games to be released in America generally receiving good reviews, Nintendo had to give away copies of Dragon Warrior. However, those four games have been among the most sought-after titles for the NES, especially Dragon Warrior III and IV. It was not until Dragon Warrior VII was released that Dragon Quest became critically acclaimed in North America, although reception was still mixed. The series gained more universal praise with Dragon Quest VIII, and began to sell better outside Japan and Dragon Quest IX sold over 1 million copies outside Japan.

One of the main aspects of the series that critics point out, either positively or negatively, is that the series "never strays from its classic roots." Unlike other modern, complex RPGs, Dragon Quest on the DS retains the simple gameplay from the first game that many critics find refreshing and nostalgic. Points of contention are its battle system, comparatively simplistic storylines, general lack of character development, simplistic primitive-looking graphics (in earlier titles), and the overall difficulty of the game. These arguments are countered by noting its strength in episodic storytelling with the various non-player characters the party meets. The stories avoid melodrama and feature relatively more simplistic characters than Final Fantasy's Squall Leonhart or Tidus, a source of contention. There are exceptions, however, such as Dragon Quest V, which has been praised for its unique, emotional storytelling. Battles are also simple and finish quickly. As for difficulty, Yuji Horii is noted as a gambler. The lack of save points and the general difficulty of the battles were included with the intention of adding a sense of tension. Because of this added difficulty, the punishment for the party's death was toned down compared to other games by simply going back to where you had last saved, with half of your gold on hand. When asked about criticism of Dragon Quest games, Horii says he does not mind, it means the critics played the game and he would rather know their concerns than remain ignorant.

=== Sales ===
As of March 2022, the Dragon Quest series had sold over 85 million copies worldwide. This number grew to over 100 million by September 2026, including digital copies. Dragon Quest III set sales records in 1988 by selling 1.1 million game cartridges in Japan within a day and 3 million in a week, and it grossed ¥20 billion ($143 million) within a month and $230 million by 1991. Dragon Quest IV in 1990 sold out 1.3 million copies within an hour, and Dragon Quest V sold over 1.3 million cartridges within a day. The series had sold 10 million copies by 1990, and 15 million units by 1993, with the Dragon Quest sequels having grossed several hundred million dollars each. As of 2007, all games in the main series, along with three spin-offs, had sold over a million copies each in Japan, with the highest-selling single release (not including remakes) being Dragon Quest VII which sold over four million copies. The remake of Dragon Quest VI sold 910,000 copies in Japan in the first four days after its release, an exceptional sales figure for a remake.

== Legacy ==
The original Dragon Quest game is often cited as the first console RPG. GameSpot called it the most influential role-playing game of all time, stating that nearly all Japanese RPGs since then have drawn from its gameplay in some shape or form. Next Generation said it was "probably the first ever 'Japanese style' RPG", and listed the series collectively as number 56 on their "Top 100 Games of All Time". They commented, "While never as ambitious as Square's Final Fantasy series, later installments of Dragon Warrior (Note: This list was published in 1996, so "later installments" refers to Dragon Quest IV, V, and VI.) can't be beaten for sheer size (if you only had enough cash to buy you one game that had to last you a month, you bought a Dragon Warrior title)." In response to a survey, Gamasutra cites Quinton Klabon of Dartmouth College as stating Dragon Warrior translated the D&D experience to video games and set the genre standards. Games such as Mother, Grandia, Lunar, Atelier, Shin Megami Tensei, Rune Factory, Story of Seasons, Breath of Fire and Lufia & the Fortress of Doom were inspired by various Dragon Quest titles. Dragon Quest III's class-changing system would shape other RPGs, especially the Final Fantasy series, and its day-night cycles was also a "major innovation" for console RPGs according to GameSpot. Dragon Quest IV's "Tactics" system, where the player can set the AI routines for NPCs, is seen as a precursor to Final Fantasy XII's "Gambits" system. Dragon Quest V is cited as having monster recruiting and training mechanics that inspired monster-collecting RPGs such as Pokémon, Digimon and Dokapon. Dragon Quest V was unique in that it made pregnancy, and who the player chose as the mother, a crucial aspect of the plot. The real world and dream world setting of Dragon Quest VI is considered an influence on the later Square RPGs Chrono Cross and Final Fantasy X. The Dragon Quest series was recognized by Guinness World Records, with six world records in the Guinness World Records Gamer's Edition. These records include "Best Selling Role Playing Game on the Super Famicom", "Fastest Selling Game in Japan", and "First Video Game Series to Inspire a Ballet".

Dragon Quest is a cultural phenomenon in Japan. According to Ryutaro Ichimura and Yuji Horii, Dragon Quest has become popular enough that it is used as a common topic for conversation in Japan, and is considered by the Japanese gaming industry as Japan's national game. William Cassidy of GameSpy claims that "the common wisdom is that if you ask someone from Japan to draw 'Slime,' he'll draw the onion-like shape of the weak enemies from the game." With the Japanese release of Dragon Quest IX in January 2009, a new eatery inspired by the series called Luida's Bar was opened in Roppongi, a well-known nightlife hotspot in Minato, Tokyo. This was notable due to the usual center of Tokyo's gaming culture being Akihabara rather than Roppongi. The venue provides a meeting location for fans of the series: styled in the fashion of a Medieval public house like its virtual counterpart, its food is directly inspired by both items and monsters found in the games. It was described by a Western journalist as a cross between a Disneyland resort and a maid café. Dragon Quest also served as the inspiration for a live-action television drama. Yūsha Yoshihiko initially aired in July 2011, with a sequel series being produced and released the following year. For its 2012 April Fool's Hoax, Google announced a "NES version" of its Google Maps service, which uses graphics and music based on the series.

There is an urban myth that the release of Dragon Quest III caused a law to be passed in Japan banning the sale of Dragon Quest games or video games in general except on certain days such as weekends or national holidays. When III was released in Japan, over 300 schoolchildren were arrested for truancy while waiting in stores for the game to be released. The rumor claims there was a measurable dip in productivity when a Dragon Quest game was released and although muggings of Dragon Quest titles became so widespread that there were hearings in the Japanese Diet, no law was ever passed. However, the Japanese release of every Dragon Quest title continued to be on a Saturday until the release of Dragon Quest X, which was released on Thursday, August 2, 2012.

Dragon Quest's music has been influential on various sectors of the performing arts. It was the first video game series to receive live-action ballet adaptations, and musical concerts and audio CDs were produced based on the Dragon Quest universe. Since 1987, the series' music has been performed annually in concert halls throughout Japan. Early Dragon Quest concerts inspired Nobuo Uematsu's compositions for the Final Fantasy series. "Lotto's Theme" was one of the video game music compositions selected for the opening ceremony of the 2020 Summer Olympics in Tokyo, and was the first to be played.

The series is also represented in the 2018 crossover fighting game Super Smash Bros. Ultimate via downloadable content released in July 2019. Unlike most of the game's roster, the "Hero" is not a single playable character but rather a character slot shared by four separate, albeit functionally identical, main protagonists from the series: Eleven (also known as The Luminary) from Dragon Quest XI, Arusu (also known as Erdrick) from Dragon Quest III, Solo from Dragon Quest IV, and Eight from Dragon Quest VIII. Other elements from the series are also featured, such as Slimes and a stage based on Yggdrasil's Altar from Dragon Quest XI.

== See also ==
- List of Dragon Quest media
- List of Square Enix video game franchises

== Footnotes ==
Notes

- Chunsoft. Dragon Warrior (Nintendo Entertainment System). Nintendo.
- Chunsoft. Dragon Warrior II (Nintendo Entertainment System). Enix.
- Chunsoft. Dragon Warrior III (Nintendo Entertainment System). Enix.
- ArtePiazza. Dragon Quest IV: Chapters of the Chosen (Nintendo DS). Square Enix.
- ArtePiazza. Dragon Quest V: Hand of the Heavenly Bride (Nintendo DS). Square Enix.
- ArtePiazza. Dragon Quest VI: Realms of Revelation (Nintendo DS). Nintendo.
- Heartbeat; ArtePiazza. Dragon Warrior VII (PlayStation). Enix.
- Level-5. Dragon Quest VIII: Journey of the Cursed King (PlayStation 2). Square Enix.
- Level-5; Square Enix. Dragon Quest IX: Sentinels of the Starry Skies (Nintendo DS). Nintendo.
