= Dragon Quest Heroes: Rocket Slime =

2005 video game

- Developer: Tose
- Publisher: Square Enix
- Director: Takumi Hosoyama
- Producer: Yoshiki Watabe
- Designer: Shinnosuke Yamada
- Programmer: Yasutaka Tokida
- Artist: Akira Toriyama
- Composer: Koichi Sugiyama
- Series: Dragon Quest; Slime
- Platform: Nintendo DS
- Release: JP: December 1, 2005; NA: September 19, 2006
- Genre: Action-adventure
- Modes: Single-player, multiplayer

Dragon Quest Heroes: Rocket Slime is an action-adventure game developed by Tose and published by Square Enix for the Nintendo DS handheld video game console. It is the sequel to Slime Mori Mori Dragon Quest: Shōgeki no Shippo Dan for the Game Boy Advance. It was first released in Japan, and later in North America. It is a spin-off of the Dragon Quest series.

Rocket Slime stars the common enemy and mascot of the series, a Slime, this one in particular being named Rocket (Surarin in the Japanese version). Rocket lives in a town called Boingburg, inhabited by other Slimes, each one being a type of Slime species found in the series. There are no humans in Rocket Slime; instead, its world is inhabited by Slimes and other enemies from the series. It features two forms of gameplay; the first being an overhead style, where the player maneuvers Rocket around a variety of stages, and another where the Schleiman Tank must do battle against an opposing tank, firing ammunition found throughout the first portion of the game.

== Gameplay ==
Rocket is seen being attacked by Platypunks, common enemies in the game.

The player views Rocket Slime from an overhead view, and controls Rocket entirely with the face and shoulder buttons. Rocket has the ability to jump as well as hover, though his primary technique is the Elasto Blast, an attack that launches Rocket forward. The Elasto Blast's strength is determined by how long the player allows for it to charge. This technique is constantly used throughout the game, used to pick up objects and attack enemies. When an enemy or object is hit by the Elasto Blast, it is sent flying, requiring the player to move forward and grab the item or enemy before they land if they wish to pick them up. The player may hold up to three items and/or enemies at any given time. Any item or enemy may be used as a weapon against an enemy if thrown at them. Rocket has a health meter that consists of multiple hearts, where Rocket will lose half a heart if damaged. The player may increase it by finding a rare item, the seed of life.

Each stage has a certain number of Slimes, and a variety of different items and enemies that can be found within. The game uses a day/night system, causing differences in enemies. Enemies that can be found awake during the day are asleep at night, and vice versa. There are several differences in the levels, but one thing they have in common are the railways. These railways typically lead back to Boingburg, allowing the player to send items, enemies, and other Slimes back to Boingburg, or leave the level via the railways. When a Slime is sent back, the Slime will send a letter to the player, including either an item or a recipe for an item. When an enemy is sent back, that enemy will become a resident of Boingburg, though only one enemy per species is allowed. When an item is sent back, it can be used as ammunition for Rocket's tank or sold at a shop. Another common element are the tank battles, where the player may battle a Plob tank. Defeating a tank gives Rocket a specific item and sometimes a Slime, who returns to Boingburg. Most stages have a boss battle near the end of the stage. All bosses have a health meter, which must be depleted for Rocket to progress any further. When the player leaves the stage, a screen is shown detailing what Slimes the player acquired in this session of the stage, as well as any items and enemies that they collected.

In between stages, the player is sent back to Boingburg to rest. In the beginning after the Plob attack, there are no Slimes remaining, and the Plobs have destroyed much of the town, leaving large spiked balls blocking much of the houses and the village. Most of these spiked balls have ST written on them, meaning "Slime Tons". The number listed is the number of Slimes the player must rescue in order to get rid of the spiked ball in question. After a certain point in the game, the rescued Slimes rebuild Boingburg and return it to its state in the prologue. There are several things the player may do while in Boingburg. Early on, the player only has the ability to save their game, but eventually gains access to much more, including tank customization, a shop, a tank arena, a surfing mini-game, and an area where the player may synthesize items using recipes that are collected throughout the game.

=== Tanks ===
Rocket and two other Slimes are loading ammo into cannons on the bottom screen, and the tank they are using is seen on the left battling the tank on the right.

Another primary game mechanic is the tank battles. Tank battles either occur in the stages or at the tank battle arena in Boingburg. In stages, when the player encounters a platform with an enemy on it standing in front of a slime-shaped tank, they may summon their tank to do battle with them. When the player goes into the battle, the top screen displays a zoomed out view of the two tanks on either side of the screen, and the bottom screen displays the standard gameplay. Each tank has two cannons that ammunition may be loaded into, and an HP meter, the latter which varies from tank to tank. Ammunition comes from varying points in the tank; the location of these drop points varies depending on which tank is being used. The player picks up ammunition using the Elasto Blast, like they pick up items in the other mode of play. They then may throw the ammunition into one or both of the cannons, causing the ammunition to be fired at the opposing tank. The opponent, however, will also fire ammunition at the player's tank. If two pieces of ammunition collide with each other, both pieces will fall to the ground, though some pieces of ammunition have more defensive and/or offensive power than others.

The player may leave their tank, either by shooting themself out of one of the cannons or by leaving the tank and breaking into the opposing tank. If the player makes it to the other tank by means of the cannon, they will enter the main area of their tank. While in their tank, the player may use the Elasto Blast attack to break their computers, making it more difficult for them to retaliate. The player may also attack their opponents or steal ammunition to use in their tank. The opponent may also do the same, either breaking in or going in via the cannon. A tank is not destroyed when its HP is depleted; instead, a door protecting the tank's engine (shaped like a heart) is destroyed, and at which point, the opposing tank's crew will invade and try to destroy the engine. If it is destroyed, the tank battle is over. Most tank battles that the player wins rewards the player with a particular item and a Slime, the Slime only appearing once per tank battle.

In Boingburg, the player may load ammunition into their tank. This ammunition consists of items the player has collected throughout the game. After a certain point in the game, the player may also choose three computer-controlled tank assistants. These consists of particular Slimes that are able to participate. Under certain conditions, the player may also gain the ability to recruit enemies. Each tank assistance has a unique set of commands that they can be ordered to follow. While in Boingburg, the player may play multi-player with another player who owns a Nintendo DS system and Dragon Quest Heroes: Rocket Slime. If another player does not own a copy, they may only play a tank battle demo.

== Story ==
Dragon Quest Heroes: Rocket Slime is based in the fictional world of Slimenia, specifically in the capital city of Boingburg. It begins with four Slimes, Rocket, Hooly, Bo, and Swotsy, who are playing in front of the castle. Hooly has gotten his hands on a valuable flute, and in response to the flute being blown by Rocket, his father comes running over, forcing Hooly to stick the flute in Rocket's mouth. Afterward, an organization of platypus-like creatures known as the Plob invades Boingburg, capturing 100 of its 101 inhabitants. They are organized by who has the most tails, with the lowest ranked villains having one, while the Plobfather has seven. Because he was distorted and long due to the flute in his mouth, the Plob mistakenly believed Rocket was not a Slime but a worm, and discarded him into Forewood Forest. There, Rocket begins his journey to rescue his fellow slimes, who have been locked up in large treasure chests. Rocket later happens upon a large tank called the Schleiman Tank, which he activates with the flute that he had acquired. This tank now allows him to battle other tanks employed by the Plob; including the Carrot Top, Platypanzer and Cactiballistix. He also must do battle with many other enemies, including the leader, Don Clawleone (a.k.a. The Plobfather), Flucifer (The Dark One) and a mysterious slime named Slival and his Schwartzman Tank. Slival becomes his nemesis and is encountered a lot throughout the game, including at Mt. Krakatroda for a final battle.

== Development ==
Dragon Quest Heroes: Rocket Slime was created by Yuji Horii, creator of the Dragon Quest franchise, and Yoshiki Watabe, who also worked on Dragon Quest V: Hand of the Heavenly Bride and Dragon Quest VIII: Journey of the Cursed King, as well as its predecessor, Slime Mori Mori Dragon Quest: Shōgeki no Shippo Dan. While planning a version of the original Dragon Quest for the Game Boy, Watabe and Horii discussed making a game aimed at children. The duo wanted to use a character from a well-known franchise and decided it should be the Slime character from Dragon Quest. The developers did not want to give the protagonist a sword and shield, feeling it would make the slime character into a blue Link from The Legend of Zelda. They also rejected having the character breathe fire or run fast like Sonic the Hedgehog, so they refocused on what a slime could do, and that is how they discovered that his movements should be stretching and catapulting itself like a slingshot. Because Watabe believed the dual screen function was the focus of the Nintendo DS, he wanted to make use of the dual screen in a way that was not done in the original Slime game. Early in the title's life, the developers had a version of it that uses the touch screen to use Rocket's Elasto Blast technique, but scrapped the idea, due to it being too hard to control. To build on the slingshot paradigm in the second game in the series, the design team added tanks. The developers also chose to keep humans out of the game, due to that if they did appear, they would probably just run around killing all the Slimes. Watabe explained that the system of enemies having tails came from his desire to explain to children the idea of a gang and a hierarchy, loosely based on his own experience with bosses.

The success of Dragon Quest VIII in the west prompted an international release for the Slime series. The protagonist's name is Rocket, which was influenced by wanting western audiences not to associate the character Slime with an inert blob, but show it was a powerful character that can “rocket“ around. Also due to lack of familiarity with "Dragon Quest" slimes, the game's title was modified to include mention of the Dragon Quest series. Efforts were made to make the game's script feel less British than a typical Dragon Quest title, to give the game a more modern feel. Watabe said that if Dragon Quest Heroes sold well, that the developer would look into a sequel, and they may also include Nintendo Wi-Fi Connection support. Rocket Slime was developed originally for gamers who were eight to ten years old, but in the west the average purchaser's age was twenty five. Enthusiasm was also higher for sequels in the west, while there was less enthusiasm in Japan.

== Reception ==
Reception

Aggregate score
Aggregator	Score
Metacritic	83/100

Dragon Quest Heroes: Rocket Slime sold over 293,000 copies in Japan by the end of 2006. It has received generally positive reception, holding an aggregate of 83/100 from Metacritic. Nintendo Power praised its multi-player tank battle mode, calling the game a "well-placed and satisfying adventure". Play Magazine commented that Rocket Slime is a quality spin-off, adding that other developers should take a cue from it. Game Informer commented that the slimes in Rocket Slime have an "irresistible charm", calling the exploration gameplay "clever". Electronic Gaming Monthly praised it, calling it a "kid's game that completely rocks". Edge noted that while it wasn't a bold game, it had little to criticize, calling its developers "masters of their craft". NGamer UK called the dialogue "so bad it's good".
