= Dragon Quest (video game) =

1986 video game

- North American NES box art
- Developer: Chunsoft (Note: HD-2D remake developed by Artdink and Square Enix Creative Studio V)
- Publishers: JP: Enix; NA: Nintendo
- Director: Koichi Nakamura
- Producer: Yukinobu Chida
- Designer: Yuji Horii
- Programmer: Koichi Nakamura
- Artist: Akira Toriyama
- Writer: Yuji Horii
- Composer: Koichi Sugiyama
- Series: Dragon Quest
- Engine: Unreal Engine 4 (HD-2D remake)
- Platform: Nintendo Entertainment System: MSX MSX2 PC-9801 Super Famicom Satellaview Game Boy Color Mobile phone Wii Android iOS Nintendo 3DS PlayStation 4 Nintendo Switch Nintendo Switch 2 PlayStation 5 Xbox Series X/S Windows
- Release: May 27, 1986: NES; JP: May 27, 1986; NA: August 1989 MSX; JP: 1986 MSX2; JP: 1986 Super Famicom; JP: December 18, 1993 Game Boy Color; JP: September 23, 1999; NA: September 27, 2000 Mobile; JP: 2004 Wii; JP: September 15, 2011 Android, iOS; JP: November 28, 2013; WW: September 11, 2014 Nintendo 3DS, PlayStation 4; JP: August 10, 2017 Nintendo Switch; WW: September 27, 2019 HD-2D Remake Windows, Switch, Switch 2, PS5, Xbox Series X/S; WW: October 30, 2025
- Genre: Role-playing
- Mode: Single-player

Dragon Quest, (Note: Japanese: ドラゴンクエスト, Hepburn: Doragon Kuesuto) titled Dragon Warrior when initially localized to North America, is a 1986 role-playing video game developed by Chunsoft and published by Enix for the Nintendo Entertainment System. It was originally released in Japan in May 1986 and by Nintendo in North America in August 1989. It is the first game in the Dragon Quest video game series. Dragon Quest has been ported and remade for several video game platforms. As of 2019, it has been ported to MSX, MSX2, PC-9801, Super Famicom, Game Boy Color, mobile phones, and Nintendo Switch. The player controls the hero character who is charged with saving the Kingdom of Alefgard and rescuing its princess from the evil Dragonlord. Dragon Quest's story became the second part in a trilogy, with several spinoff anime and manga series.

Dragon Quest was created by Yuji Horii, inspired by previous role-playing games such as Wizardry, Ultima, and his own 1983 game The Portopia Serial Murder Case. Horii wanted to create an introductory RPG for a wide audience. He emphasized storytelling and emotional involvement, and simplified the interface, to translate the mostly Western PC game genre of RPG to the Japanese console market. Manga artist and Dragon Ball creator Akira Toriyama produced the artwork and Koichi Sugiyama composed the music. The North American version features numerous changes, including battery-backed RAM save games (rather than using a password save system), larger character sprites, and pseudo-Elizabethan English style dialog.

Dragon Quest was commercially successful in Japan, but its later release as Dragon Warrior in North America was less favorably received. The original version of the game sold more than 2 million copies worldwide, with 1.5 million sold in Japan and 500,000 in the United States. Later, Western critics noted the game's shortcomings but acknowledged its importance to the genre. It inspired fan-made ROM hacks with substantial changes. The game's synthesized soundtrack has been orchestrated, and its music has been performed at numerous concerts. As a whole, Dragon Quest has been credited with establishing the basic template for subsequent Japanese console RPGs.

== Gameplay ==
Dragon Warrior is a single-player role-playing video game. Years after its release, its gameplay mechanics have been described as simplistic and spartan. The player controls a young hero who sets out to defeat the Dragonlord. The player starts with a menu to begin a new quest, continue a previous quest, or change the speed in which messages appear on the screen. In the Japanese version, continuing a quest requires a password. In the North American Nintendo Entertainment System (NES) English version, the quest is saved onto the game cartridge's battery-backup (called an "Adventure Log" in the "Imperial Scrolls of Honor"), with options to delete or duplicate a saved quest. In a new quest, the player may give the hero any name; the game analyzes the name entered to determine the initial ability scores and their statistical growth over the course of the game.

Dragon Warrior presents players with a clear objective from the start and uses a series of smaller scenarios to increase the hero's strength in order to achieve the objective. The game begins in King Lorik's chamber in Tantegel Castle, where the hero receives information about the Dragonlord, whom he must defeat, and the stolen Balls of Light, which he must retrieve. After receiving some items and gold, the hero sets out on his quest. Much of Dragon Warrior is spent talking to townspeople and gathering information from them that leads to additional places, events, and secrets. Towns contain shops that sell improved weapons and armor; general stores where the player may buy other goods; inns that allow the hero to recover his health and magic, and shops that offer keys for purchase. The player may sell items at half price to shops that provide weapons, armor, or general goods. The hero's status window is shown whenever he stops moving, displaying his current experience level (LV) and the number of hit points (HP), magic points (MP), gold (G), and experience points (E).

Battling a Slime in Dragon Warrior for the NES

To safely progress to the next areas in the game, the player needs to accumulate experience points and gold by defeating enemies outside of towns – in the overworld and in dungeons. Apart from the Dragonlord's castle and locked doors, there are no physical restrictions on where players can roam. Instead, monsters increase in difficulty as players venture further from Tantegel castle. As the hero's level increases, the player can explore further afield with less risk. Enemies appear in random encounters and the hero fights one opponent at a time. The encounter rate is lowest on fields and increases in forests and hills. Battles are turn-based and fought from a first-person perspective while the hero remains off-screen. In combat, players must defeat the enemy by reducing its HP to zero. During combat, players have four commands: "fight", "run", "spell", and "item". The "fight" command causes the hero to attack the enemy with a weapon, or with his bare fists if no weapon is available, in an attempt to inflict damage. With the "run" command, the hero attempts to escape from a battle, which is recommended if his HP is low. The "spell" command casts magic that can, for example, heal the hero or damage the enemy. The "item" command uses herbs that replenish the hero's HP.

During combat, the hero loses HP when he takes damage, and the display turns red when his HP is low. If his HP falls to zero, he dies and is taken back to King Lorik to be resurrected, and loses half his gold "as punishment". If the hero succeeds in defeating an enemy, he gains experience points and gold; if he gains enough experience points, his experience level increases, giving him greater strength, agility, speed, and the ability to use magic spells. Every time a spell is used, the hero's MP decreases at a different cost per spell. Both HP and MP can be restored by resting at an inn, and a non-player character can replenish the hero's MP in Tantegel Castle. As the hero earns more gold, better weapons, armor, and items can be purchased. The player can conservatively manage the limited inventory space. Exploring the dark caves requires a torch or the "RADIANT" spell to display a temporary field of vision. In the English version, the player can return to King Lorik at any time to save the quest.

The control pad moves the hero and the menu cursor. Other buttons confirm and cancel commands. The English version has menu commands to talk to people, check their status, search beneath their feet, use items, take treasure chests, open doors, and use stairs. In some remakes, certain commands are assigned to buttons, navigating stairs is automatic, and the hero's speed is higher.

== Plot ==
Dragon Warrior's plot is a twist on the classic damsel in distress, in that the player does not even have to meet with or speak with her to complete the game.

=== Backstory ===
Dragon Warrior, its sequel, Dragon Quest II, and its prequel, Dragon Quest III, make up a trilogy with a shared timeline. The story's background begins when the kingdom of Alefgard was shrouded in permanent darkness. The brave warrior Erdrick ("Loto" in the Japanese versions as a well as the English version of the Game Boy Color remake) defeated an evil creature and restored light to the land. In Erdrick's possession was the Ball of Light, which he used to drive away enemies who threatened the kingdom. Erdrick handed the Ball of Light to King Lorik, and Alefgard remained peaceful for a long time. The Ball of Light kept winters short in Alefgard and helped maintain peace and prosperity for the region.

However, there is one man who shunned the Ball of Light's radiance and secluded himself in a mountain cave. One day, while exploring the cave's extensive network of tunnels, the man encountered a sleeping dragon who awoke upon his entrance. He feared the dragon would incinerate him with its fiery breath, but the dragon instead knelt before him and obeyed his commands. This man, who is later discovered to be a dragon, became known as the Dragonlord. One day, after his soul became corrupted by learning magic, the Dragonlord attacked Tantegel Castle and the nearby town of Breconnary with his fleet of dragons and set the town on fire. Riding a large red dragon, the Dragonlord descended upon Tantegel Castle and stole the Ball of Light. Soon, monsters began to appear throughout the entire land, destroying everything in their paths. Much of the land became poisonous marshes, and at least one destroyed town never recovered and remains in ruins.

The following day, Erdrick arrived at Tantegel Castle to speak with King Lorik and offered his help to defeat the Dragonlord. After searching the land for clues to the Dragonlord's location, Erdrick found that the Dragonlord lived on an island that could be accessed only via a magical bridge that only a Rainbow Drop could generate. After venturing to the island, Erdrick disappeared. Many years later, during King Lorik XVI's reign, the Dragonlord attacked the kingdom again and captured Princess Gwaelin. Many heroes tried and failed to rescue the princess and recover the Ball of Light from the Dragonlord's castle, called Charlock. The prophet Mahetta predicted that "One day, a descendant of the valiant Erdrick shall come forth to defeat the Dragonlord." However, when the descendant arrives as the game's hero, many of the people of Alefgard have forgotten the story of Erdrick, and those few who do remember consider it a myth and do not believe in Mahetta's prophecy. King Lorik starts to mourn the decline of his kingdom.

=== Characters ===
The two main characters are the hero and the Dragonlord. Major supporting characters are King Lorik (King Lars in the GBC remake); his daughter Princess Gwaelin (Lady Lora), and two sages the hero meets during his journey.

The hero, who comes from a land beyond Alefgard, is a descendant of the legendary Erdrick. When the hero arrives, he does not appear to be a warrior – he arrives without weapons or armor – and is ignorant of the situation. The populace thinks his claim of the ability to defeat the Dragonlord are preposterous; however, King Lorik sees this ability, which give him hope and he aids the hero on his quest.

The Dragonlord is a dragon who rules from Charlock Castle, which is visible from Tantegel Castle, the game's starting point. His soul became evil by learning magic. Rumors say that, through a spy network, he knows everything that happens in Alefgard. He seeks "unlimited power and destruction", which results in a rising tide of evil throughout Alefgard. The Dragonlord wants to enslave the world with his army of monsters that he controls with his will.

=== Main story ===
The game begins when the player assumes the role of a stranger who arrives at Tantegel Castle. A castle guard tells him that a dragon has captured the princess and is holding her captive in a distant cave. Determined to rescue the princess and defeat the Dragonlord, he discovers an ancient tablet hidden inside a desert cave; carved on the tablet is a message from Erdrick that outlines what the hero needs to do to follow in Erdrick's footsteps and defeat the Dragonlord. The hero eventually rescues Princess Gwaelin, but realizes that in order to restore light to Alefgard, he must defeat the Dragonlord at Charlock Castle. After the hero collects a series of relics, he creates a bridge to reach Charlock and fights his way through the castle before finally confronting the Dragonlord. At this point the hero is given a dialogue choice – to side with the Dragonlord or to challenge him. If players choose the former, the game ends, the hero is put to sleep, and the game freezes; however, in the GBC remake, the hero instead wakes up from a bad dream. If the player chooses to fight, a final battle between the hero and the Dragonlord commences.

Once the hero defeats the Dragonlord he reclaims the Ball of Light, eradicating all monsters in Alefgard, and triumphantly returns to Tantegel Castle where King Lorik offers his kingdom as a reward. The hero turns down the offer and instead wishes to find his own kingdom. Accompanied by Princess Gwaelin, the hero then sets off in search of a new land; this sets the stage for the events in Dragon Quest II, which take place many years later and tells the story of three of the hero's descendants.

In a post-credit scene of HD-2D Remake, Hargon is seen on an altar, vowing to his former matron that despite her son's failure to remake the world, he will do it himself, swearing it upon his name once more.

== Development ==
=== Background ===
When Eidansha Boshu Service Center was founded in 1975 it published tabloid magazines that advertised real estate. In 1982, after failing to establish a chain of stores, the company's founder Yasuhiro Fukushima transformed it into a software company devoted to gaming and created Enix. To find talent for the company, Fukushima held the "Enix Game Hobby Program Contest". The competition was styled after manga competitions, was advertised in computer and manga magazines, and had a ¥1 million prize for the winners. The winners were Kazuro Morita (森田和郎), Koichi Nakamura, and manga magazine Shōnen Jump writer Yuji Horii, who was the top winner. Horii designed a tennis game, Love Match Tennis, which became Enix's first release. While he did not believe he would win, he was motivated by his editor, who enjoyed the games and published Horii's articles on them. Later, when Enix began creating games for the NES, Fukushima held another contest. This time, Nakamura won with his "cartoonish and creative contest entry" Door Door, which became Enix's first release for the NES.

Horii's earliest inspiration for Dragon Quest is his own 1983 PC adventure game The Portopia Serial Murder Case – a murder mystery adventure game that bears some similarities to games such as Mystery House (1980), Zork (1980), King's Quest (1984), and particularly Déjà Vu (1985). Horii wanted to advance the game's storyline through dialogue. Portopia was originally released for Japan's NEC PC-6001 and was later ported to the Famicom in 1985. The port is Enix's second release for the system and the first game which Horii and Nakamura worked on together. Horii redesigned the interface for the port to accommodate the console's limited controls, and added a dungeon-crawling area which the detective explores. While Portopia did not directly result in Dragon Quest's creation, it was, according to 1UP.com, "a proving ground" for the RPG. The menu-based command system of Portopia would later be used in Dragon Quest.

At the time I first made Dragon Quest, computer and video game RPGs were still very much in the realm of hardcore fans and not very accessible to other players. So I decided to create a system that was easy to understand and emotionally involving, and then placed my story within that framework.

— Yuji Horii on the design of the first Dragon Quest

The original idea for what became Dragon Quest came during the development of the 1985 Famicom port of Portopia. Horii and Nakamura discovered the RPG Wizardry at a Macworld Conference & Expo. It had some influence on the Famicom Portopia's dungeon crawl segments, and Horii liked its depth and visuals. He wanted to create a game similar to Wizardry, to expose Japan to the mainly Western-dominated RPG genre, and to expand the genre beyond computer enthusiasts. Horii also cited Ultima as an inspiration for Dragon Quest's gameplay, specifically the first-person random battles in Wizardry and the overhead perspective of Ultima. Though the RPG genre was predominantly Western and limited to PCs, Japanese gamers enjoyed home-grown games such as The Black Onyx and the Dragon Slayer series alongside Western RPG ports. However, while Horii and Nakamura enjoyed the dungeon crawling and statistical nature of Wizardry, they realized most people would not. This had not originally been a concern, but the success of Super Mario Bros. greatly increased the potential audience of any new Famicom or NES game. To create Dragon Quest, the gameplay needed to be simplified. According to Horii: "There was no keyboard, and the system was much simpler, using just a [game] controller. But I still thought that it would be really exciting for the player to play as their alter ego in the game. I personally was playing Wizardry and Ultima at the time, and I really enjoyed seeing my own self in the game."

In order to create an RPG that would appeal to a wide audience unfamiliar with the genre, and video games in general, Horii wanted to create a new kind of RPG that did not rely on previous experience with the Dungeons & Dragons tabletop RPG, did not require hundreds of hours of rote fighting, and could appeal to any kind of gamer. To accomplish this he needed to simplify the system and have players associate themselves with the hero. Thus as the game progressed, the hero would become stronger, in contrast to action games like Super Mario Bros. where Mario does not become continuously more powerful throughout the entire game. He wanted to build on Portopia and place a greater emphasis on storytelling and emotional involvement. He developed a coming-of-age tale that audiences could relate to and made use of RPG level-building gameplay as a way to represent this.

=== Japanese development ===
Yuji Horii and his team at Chunsoft began developing Dragon Quest in 1985. He believed that the Famicom was the ideal platform for it, because unlike arcade games, players would not worry about spending money if they got a game over, and they could continue playing from where they left off. Losing a battle results in resurrection at a previous save point rather than the game ending, making the game more accessible. He wanted to include multiple player characters but was forced to use only one due to memory constraints. Horii knew that RPGs had a steeper learning curve than other video games, and to compensate for this he implemented quick level-ups at the start of the game with a clear final goal that is visible from the world map's starting point: the Dragonlord's castle. He provided a series of smaller scenarios in order to build up the player's strength to achieve the final objective. He created an open world which is not blocked physically in any way except by monsters that can easily kill unprepared players; Gamasutra described this as one of the earliest examples of nonlinear gameplay. Horii used bridges to signify changes in difficulty and implemented a level progression with a high starting growth rate that decelerates over time, which contrasts with the random initial stats and constant growth rates of the early editions of Dungeons & Dragons. To appeal to a larger audience, manga artist and creator of Dragon Ball, Akira Toriyama, was hired. As with Dragon Ball, his artwork features characters "whose strength and cunning transcend generations", with humorous elements such as a chibi style.

Koichi Sugiyama, the game's music composer, solicited Enix via a PC game's feedback questionnaire. He was already a well-known composer of television shows and pop songs, and, upon seeing his feedback, Enix producer Yukinobu Chida contacted him to confirm that "he was the Sugiyama from television". Chida asked Sugiyama to compose a score for Dragon Quest. The game's classical score is Sugiyama's second video game composition after Wingman 2. He said it took him five minutes to compose the original opening theme, and noted the difficulty in adding a personal touch to the short jingles, but that his past experience with creating music for television commercials helped. According to Sugiyama, a composer has between three and five seconds to catch the audience's attention through music. The theme and his other jingles for Dragon Quest have remained relatively intact in its sequels.

=== 1989 North American localization ===
Dragon Quest and Dragon Warrior have noticeable graphical differences.

Coverage of Dragon Quest's North American localization first appeared in Nintendo Fun Club News's Winter 1987 issue. With this, the game's title was changed to Dragon Warrior to avoid infringing on the trademark on wargame publisher Simulations Publications's pen-and-paper RPG DragonQuest. The article sources the game's Japanese version for images and names, briefly explaining the backstory and basic gameplay elements, comparing the game to The Legend of Zelda. The game was later mentioned in Nintendo Power's "Pak Watch" preview section in March 1989, mentioning Dragon Quest III's Japanese release in the magazine's premiere July 1988 issue. It again mentioned the change of name from Dragon Quest to Dragon Warrior, its inspiration of two Japanese sequels, and that its release was still distant in time.

== Release ==
Release years by platforms
Platform	JP	NA	EU
Famicom/NES	1986	1989	N/A
MSX	1986	N/A	N/A
MSX2	1986	N/A	N/A
PC-9801	1986	N/A	N/A
Super Famicom	1993	N/A	N/A
Game Boy Color	1999	2000	N/A
Cellphones	2004	N/A	N/A
Wii	2011	N/A	N/A
Android, iOS	2013	2014	
PlayStation 4, Nintendo 3DS	2017	N/A	N/A
Nintendo Switch	2019		

Dragon Quest was released in Japan in 1986 for the Famicom, the MSX, the MSX2, and the PC-9801.

Dragon Warrior was released in North America by Nintendo of America under the direction of Satoru Iwata with help from Horii in August 1989 – months before the Japanese release of Dragon Quest IV. Because the game was released in North America more than three years after the original release in Japan, the graphics were improved. Instead of lengthy passwords with kana characters, the North American version has a battery-backed RAM savegame. Akira Toriyama's artwork in the instruction booklets was changed to reflect a more traditional tone of popular American based RPGs such as the Ultima series. The character sprites were changed to face their direction of travel; in the Japanese versions, the sprites are smaller and face only forward, requiring players to choose a direction for actions from a menu. Spells were given self-explanatory one-word titles instead of the made-up words of the Japanese version. Locations were renamed, and dialogue was rewritten from its whimsical style comparable to Dragon Ball to a style inspired by Elizabethan English, with sentences such as "Thy hit points have decreased by 1." Nintendo also removed salacious humor and religious connotations from the English-language version. For example, in the Japanese version, in the town where the hero first buys keys, a woman offers to sell puff-puff—a Japanese onomatopoeia for a girl rubbing her breasts in someone's face, or juggling her own breasts. In the North American version, the same woman sells tomatoes. The term has been included in the game's sequels as well as in Toriyama's Dragon Ball series.

Katsuya Terada created some of the artwork for the early Dragon Warrior articles in Nintendo Power. Neither Terada nor those editing the artwork for the instruction booklet followed Toriyama's work; they instead used the settings and character poses to create alternate artwork in an American style. The Japanese hero has a chibi manga style, and the English version's appearance is based on "the West's template of a medieval hero".

In June 1989, Electronic Gaming Monthly's "Quartermann" speculated that Dragon Warrior would be Nintendo's "big release" in North America that Christmas based on the immense popularity of the series in Japan, especially Dragon Quest III. Nintendo Power provided three feature articles on Dragon Warrior for issues between May and October 1989 and the November–December 1989 issue includes a strategy guide. The March–April 1990 issue of Nintendo Power has a map of the game world, with a poster of Super Contra on the other side, and a Dragon Warrior text adventure.

In late 1990, Nintendo reportedly strategized the unloading of unsold game units by sending free copies of Dragon Warrior to Nintendo Power subscribers, including a 64-page Explorer's Handbook with a full walkthrough of the game and additional backstory. At the time, the game cost approximately US$50 (equivalent to about $130 in 2025) at retail and the magazine's subscription fee was only $20. The giveaway attracted nearly 500,000 new magazine subscribers, and many more renewed subscriptions just to get the game. The series would eventually see greater success in North America more than a decade later.

=== Re-releases and remakes ===
Dragon Quest was updated for the Super Famicom. Tantegel Castle (center) is the hero's starting location, and the Dragonlord's Charlock Castle is the goal (bottom-right).

Enix remade Dragon Quest and Dragon Quest II for the single-cartridge compilation Dragon Quest I & II for the Super Famicom on December 18, 1993. More than 1.2 million copies were sold in Japan. In 1998, Enix released BS Dragon Quest for the Super Famicom via the Satellaview peripheral exclusively in Japan. The latter consists of four one-hour scenarios downloaded on a weekly schedule. The player is tasked with leveling the character, collecting medals, and completing scenario-specific conditions with special real-time events.

The compilation was re-released for the GBC, developed by Tose and released by Enix on September 23, 1999, in Japan and September 27, 2000, in North America. It uses an entirely new translation, discards the pseudo-Elizabethan English style and uses names closer to those in the Japanese version. In this remake, "Dragonlord" is changed to "DracoLord", and "Erdrick" is changed to "Loto". Several additional features were added such as where the player can quicksave the game anytime outside a battle. Players can store some gold. The menu was streamlined and monsters yield more experience and gold, saving time.

In 2004, Dragon Quest and its sequel were remade for mobile phones in Japan. These are graphically based on the Super Famicom remake of Dragon Quest III and Dragon Quest VI.

On September 15, 2011, the Dragon Quest 25th Anniversary Collection compilation for the Wii was released in Japan, containing the Famicom version, Super Famicom version, Dragon Quest II, and Dragon Quest III. It includes original copies of the games' strategy guides, original artwork, and development material. In October 2013, Square Enix announced the re-release of Dragon Quest I–VIII for Android and iOS. In November 2013, the game was released for iOS and Android in Japan, based on the 2004 mobile remake. The United States and Europe mobile versions were released on September 11, 2014.

In the Nintendo Direct in September 2019, Nintendo confirmed that Dragon Quest I, II and III, would be released on the Nintendo Switch on September 27, 2019. In June 2024, Dragon Quest I & II HD-2D Remake was announced for release on October 30, 2025, for Nintendo Switch, Nintendo Switch 2, PlayStation 5, Windows, and Xbox Series X/S.

== Related media ==
Dragon Warrior has inspired related media in the form of a manga series, which has been adapted to anime, and a symphonic video game soundtrack.

=== Anime and manga ===
The manga series, Dragon Quest Retsuden: Roto no Monshō (ドラゴンクエスト列伝 ロトの紋章, Dragon Quest Saga: Emblem of Roto), was written by Chiaki Kawamata and Junji Koyanagi, with artwork by Kamui Fujiwara, and was published between 1991 and 1997 by Monthly Shōnen Gangan. Enix compiled the series into 21 volumes, which were later released on compact disc in 1994. It was released on December 11, 2009 for the PlayStation Store as part of the initial launch of Sony's digital comic distribution. In 1996, an anime movie based on the manga was released on videocassette. Square Enix started publishing a sequel series, Dragon Quest Retsuden: Roto no Monshō ~Monshō o Tsugumono-tachi e~ (ドラゴンクエスト列伝 ロトの紋章 ～紋章を継ぐ者達へ～, Dragon Quest Retsuden: Emblem of Roto – To the Children Who Inherit the Emblem), in 2005. Jun Eishima wrote the first four volumes, and Takashi Umemura wrote the last five; Yuji Horii supervised the manga, and Kamui Fujiwara contributed the artwork.

Dragon Quest Saga: Emblem of Roto takes place between Dragon Warrior III and Dragon Warrior. After monsters possessed Carmen's king for seven years, the kingdom fell to the hordes of evil. The only survivors were Prince Arus and an army General's daughter, Lunafrea. Meanwhile, in the Kingdom of Loran, a child is born and is named Jagan in accordance with the demon lord Imagine's orders. Arus and Lunafrea set out to defeat the monsters and restore peace to the world. The sequel, To the Children Who Inherit the Emblem, takes place five years after the events in Dragon Quest Saga: Emblem of Roto. The world is again in chaos and a young boy, Arosu (アロス), sets out to gather companions to help him save the world from evil.

=== Soundtrack ===
Koichi Sugiyama composed and directed the music for Dragon Warrior. The soundtrack included eight tracks, which RPGFan said was "the foundation for Sugiyama's career". The pieces were arranged and incorporated into later Dragon Warrior games' soundtracks. The music has been released in a variety of formats. The first is as a Drama CD, released by Enix on July 19, 1991, which incorporated a narrated story. Super Famicom Edition Symphonic Suite Dragon Quest I, published by Sony Records on January 12, 1994, followed; the soundtrack featured orchestral versions of the tracks played by the London Philharmonic Orchestra and the original versions of the tunes. The game's classical score was considered revolutionary for console game music. The soundtrack's "eight melodies" approach set the template for most RPG soundtracks released since then, hundreds of which have been organized in a similar manner.

The orchestral albums for Dragon Warrior I and II were combined in Symphonic Suite Dragon Quest I•II, released by SME Visual Works on August 23, 2000, King Records reprinted it on October 7, 2009. The orchestral tracks were again released in the Symphonic Suite Dragon Quest I album, including orchestral versions of the game's sound effects. Numerous live concerts have featured performances of the game's music; many performances were later released as albums such as Dragon Quest in Concert and Suite Dragon Quest I•II.

== Reception ==
=== NES version ===
Contemporary reviews

Review scores
Publication	Score
Nintendo Power	3/5
Famicom Hisshoubon	4/5, 3.5/5, 4/5 (Note: Each of the three reviewers in Famicom Hisshoubon ranked the game on a 5 point scale.)
The Day	10/10

Award
Publication	Award
Famitsu Best Hit Game Awards (1986)	Game of the Year; Best Scenario/Story; Best Character Design; Best Programmer (Koichi Nakamura); Best RPG

Initial sales of the game were so low that Enix was going to lose money, but several Shonen Jump articles by Horii helped increase its sales substantially. People liked Toriyama's artwork and Sugiyama's music, which the book Power-Up: How Japanese Video Games Gave the World an Extra Life said "was richer and more exciting than any game music had ever sounded". In Japan, 1.5 million copies of the original version were sold. More than 1 million of those copies were sold within the first six months. It was very successful there and launched a popular series with several spin-off series and stand-alone games.

In Famicom Hisshoubon, the game received generally positive scores with one reviewer complimenting the character design, the background music and how you can buy and sell items. They found the only detractor was that too many weak enemies such as the slime would continuously show up.

In the first Famitsu Best Hit Game Awards (published February 1987, for 1986 releases), Dragon Quest won the awards for Game of the Year, Best Scenario/Story, Best Character Design, Best Programmer (for Koichi Nakamura), and Best RPG. The 1989 "All Soft Catalog" issue of Famicom Tsūshin (Famitsu) includes Dragon Quest in its list of the best games of all time, receiving the Best RPG and Best Character Design awards, but losing to Dragon Quest III for the overall Grand Prize for best game of all time.

Several years after the Japanese release, the first English version of Dragon Warrior was initially seen as a commercial failure, but the Nintendo Power subscription giveaway was eventually a success and allowed Enix to bring the next three games to North America. According to Chris Kohler, Nintendo profited immensely from the giveaway because "Nintendo Power was essentially a hundred-page monthly ad for Nintendo products", and it was now in thousands of households. The game sold about 500,000 copies in the United States, making it the third best-selling 1989 game release in North America, below Nintendo's Tetris and Super Mario Land. In total, Dragon Quest sold more than 2 million copies worldwide.

In North America, the English version garnered generally favorable reviews upon release. It received a positive review from Computer Entertainer, which compared it favorably with Ultima and The Legend of Zelda, concluding "Nintendo definitely has a winner" with Dragon Warrior. Nintendo Power rated it about three out of five. It debuted at No. 7 on the magazine's bimonthly "Top 30" top NES games list in November 1989. It climbed to No. 5 in January 1990 and remained there for 4 months; it then dropped to No. 11 in May, No. 14 in July, and No. 16 in September 1990, then leaving the list. In the "Nintendo Power Awards 1989", the game was nominated for "Best Theme, Fun" and "Best Overall"; but did not win in either category. In response to Japanese youths' arrests while waiting for Dragon Quest III's release, Electronic Gaming Monthly's Quartermann said that the game was not "that special at all", compared it to the NES version of Ultima III: Exodus and recommended that others play that game instead.

Retrospective reviews

Aggregate scores
Aggregator	Score							
Aggregator	GBC	iOS	NES	NS	PC	PS5	SNES	Xbox Series X/S
GameRankings	82%							
Metacritic		73/100		63/100				
OpenCritic				95%	95%	95%		95%

Review scores
Publication	Score							
Publication	GBC	iOS	NES	NS	PC	PS5	SNES	Xbox Series X/S
AllGame			3.5/5					
Famitsu	30/40						35/40	
GameSpot	8/10							
IGN	9.6/10							
Nintendo Power	8/10							
RPGamer			4/5					
TouchArcade		3.5/5						

The game's release has been regarded as important in the history of the console RPG genre. Kohler noted that Toriyama's and Sugiyama's contributions to the game "made Dragon Quest as visually and aurally exciting as the game play was unique and sophisticated". GameSpot named it as one of the fifteen most influential video games in history. IGN listed it as the eighth best all-time NES game. In 2005, it listed it as the 92nd-best all-time video game, and in 2007 it listed the game as the 29th best. Nintendo Power rated Dragon Warrior as the 140th-best game made for the Nintendo System in its Top 200 Games list in 2006. RPGamer's Bill Johnson gave it a 4 out of 5 overall score. The NES version received considerable praise for adding extra characters and depth to the story. The removal of the stylized dialogue in the GBC remake has similarly been lamented. AllGame declared that "despite its enormous influence [...] Dragon Warrior is a flawed game. It has some decent design ideas, but it's just not terribly enjoyable", noting simplistic graphics, slow pace, and poor sound.

Seemingly primitive by modern standards, Dragon Warrior features one-on-one combat, a limited item and equipment array, ten spells, five towns, and five dungeons. While noting its importance to the development of the RPG genre, Allgame reviewer Kyle Knight stated that "taken on its own merits, it's just not an enjoyable game to play." 1UP.com explained that the series was not immensely popular at first in North America because American console gamers were not used to the idea of RPGs, and that it would take a decade for the genre to be "flashy enough to distract from all of those words they made you read". Chi Kong Lui wrote for GameCritics that the game added realism to video games, which allows players to identify with the main character on a much larger scale, saying "If a player perished in Dragon Warrior, he or she had to suffer the dire consequences of losing progress and precious gold. That element of death evoked a sense of instinctive fear and tension for survival." IGN writer Mark Nix compared the game's seemingly archaic plot to more modern RPGs, saying, "Noble blood means nothing when the society is capitalist, aristocratic, or militaristic. Damsels don't need rescuing—they need a battle axe and some magic tutoring in the field." Reviewing Dragon Quest VIII: Journey of the Cursed King, GameSpy staff wrote that Dragon Warrior is many gamers' first exposure to the console RPG. Recalling their past, a staff member commented:

It opened my eyes to a fun new type of gameplay. Suddenly strategy (or at least pressing the "A" button) was more important than reflex, and the story was slightly (slightly!) more complex than the 'rescue the princess' stuff I'd seen up 'till then. After all, Dragon Warrior was only half-over when you rescued its princess.

Bill Johnson compared Dragon Warrior to modern RPGs and noted the game's lack of replay value, which is due to the game's requirement of total completion and to its overall difficulty. He noted the game's historical importance, saying, "[Playing Dragon Warrior is] a tough road to walk, but reaching its end will instill a new appreciation of what today's RPGs are all about." The 2009 book Vintage Games contrasted Dragon Warrior to the 1986 NES game The Legend of Zelda, saying that though both games share common RPG elements, Zelda features a fantasy setting and magic but no level or turn-based combat system, and Dragon Warrior features both. Nintendo Power said the game's historical significance is its greatest aspect, and noted that "playing Dragon Warrior these days can be a bit of a chore". GamePro wrote that their favorite aspect of the game was the Elizabethan-English dialogue, and that they were disappointed by its removal in the GBC remake.

=== Remakes ===
The Dragon Quest I & II remake for the Super Famicom yielded 1.2 million copies sold in Japan. Famitsu gave the Super Famicom compilation remake Dragon Quest I & II a rating of 35 out of 40. The Satellaview remake was given a mixed, but overall positive review by Microgroup, saying that the touches such as the real-time event and voicing were appreciated but their implementation was lacking. They praised the medal collection as a nice way to compete with friends. Dragon Warrior's English remake, as part of the dual GBC cartridge Dragon Warrior I & II, received better reviews than the original. IGN and Nintendo Power gave it an 8 out of 10. IGN's Marc Nix noted that while "it's one of the only interesting RPGs on the Game Boy Color to actually make American shores", players will be frustrated; those who played the original will lament the changes, while new players will find the game too linear and simple. GameSpot gave it a 9.6 out of 10, citing the great improvements to sound quality and the appeal of playing both games in succession, and GameRankings reports an 82% overall score. It received both GameSpot's and RPGamer's awards for Game Boy Color Game of the Year, and was nominated for GameSpot's "Role-Playing Game of the Year" prize among console games. Comparing it to its NES counterpart, RPGamer's Derek Cavin awarded it 3 out of 5, saying that the game is above average in all aspects, and particularly praised the visual elements. He criticized its repetitiveness, but said that it is short enough that most players should finish the game before repetition becomes an issue. Combined, both the SNES and GBC remakes had more than 1.94 million copies sold worldwide. With the remakes' good sales performances, Enix released Dragon Warrior III for the GBC in 2001, which was based on a previously unreleased SNES update of Dragon Quest III's English version.

=== Related media ===
Square Enix Music Online's Juan2Darien reviewed the game's symphonic scores: Dragon Quest Suite; Dragon Quest I Remix Symphonic Suite (London Philharmonic Orchestra); Dragon Quest I & II Symphonic Suite (London Philharmonic Orchestra Remastered); and Dragon Quest I Symphonic Suite (Tokyo Metropolitan Symphony Orchestra). Comparing each of the suites, he gave all ratings ranging 7 through 9 out of 10, and found the Tokyo Strings Ensemble recording superior. He praised efforts by Koichi Sugiyama and the orchestras to compose an above-average piece beyond the flatness of the source material. Gamasutra's Kurt Kalata also praised the symphonies' melody, commenting that "the overworld theme... is pretty simplistic and grating, but actually sounds pretty beautiful when played by a live orchestra".

Dragon Quest Retsuden: Roto no Monshō – To the Children Who Inherit the Emblem had high sales in Japan. For the week of August 26 to September 1, 2008, volume 7 was ranked 9th in Japan, with 59,540 copies sold. For the week of February 24 to March 2, 2009, volume 8 was ranked 19th in Japan, at 76,801 copies. For the week of October 26 to November 1, 2009, volume 9 was ranked 16th in Japan, at 40,492 copies for a total of 60,467.

== Legacy ==
Bits and pieces of Dragon Warrior had been seen in video games before, but never all sewn up together so neatly. DW's incredible combination of gameplay elements established it as THE template for console RPGs to follow.

— William Cassidy, The GameSpy Hall of Fame: Dragon Warrior

The release of Dragon Quest and Dragon Warrior prompted a turning point in video game history. The game has been listed as a genre builder for RPGs. Its popularity in Japan is synonymous with RPGs. Though bearing elements of previous RPGs, Dragon Quest set a comprehensively new template from gameplay to narrative, as the foundation for nearly every subsequent RPG. According to Shigeru Miyamoto, the success of Dragon Quest changed the nature of video game development by making scenario writers far more important.

Many of the development techniques were intended to compensate for Famicom hardware limitations, but contemporary RPG developers continue to use these techniques regardless of technological advances. Dragon Warrior introduced the damsel-in-distress storyline that many RPGs follow, and a fresh plot twist to the "saving the princess" formula, where the game's true objective is not revealed until the princess is rescued. The game introduced an element of romance, where the player character is given a dialogue choice to respond to the princess's question of whether he loves her; romance has since become a commonplace feature in the genre. The game's 2D graphic style was used by most RPGs until the advent of 3D graphics, and is still a staple of the genre. Dragon Warrior's top-down perspective has become "a dead giveaway to an RPG". The game featured elements still found in most RPGs, such as the ability to obtain better equipment, major quests that intertwine with minor subquests, an incremental spell system, use of hit points and experience points, and a medieval theme. Reviewers said that, though Final Fantasy has been considered more important due to its popularity and attention in North America, Dragon Warrior laid the fundamentals on which Final Fantasy was based.

In the Nintendo Power's November 2010 issue, in celebration of the NES's 25th anniversary in North America, Horii recalled the making of Dragon Warrior. Horii was a fan of basic RPG mechanics, and wanted to simplify the interfaces; he said that many other RPGs' interfaces at the time "were so complicated that they intimidated new users". He said that Dragon Quest's simplified gameplay made the game appealing to people and made the franchise successful. He had been told that the Famicom lacks sufficient capacity for RPGs, which further motivated him to make one.

Dragon Quest became a national phenomenon in Japan, inspiring spinoff media and figurines. The video game industry has called it Japan's national game. Horii, who was linked through his Shonen Jump articles, increased in celebrity status, and become a household name in Japan, as well known in Japan as Steven Spielberg is in the US; in contrast Miyamoto, creator of Super Mario Bros. and The Legend of Zelda, is not nearly as well-known. In a Famitsu poll, the Japanese public voted Dragon Quest as the seventh favorite game for the NES. Several games such as Glory of Heracles, Legend of the Ghost Lion, and Mother were inspired by the Japanese version's success. Shigesato Itoi was a fan of Dragon Quest, and Miyamoto was a detractor of the RPG genre, so in developing Mother, they subverted the Dragon Quest template by changing the setting and themes from the Middle Ages to those of the US. Many NES games including Dragon Warrior have had fan-made ROM hacks with a new plot and revised character sprites upon the same gameplay and layout, such as Super Mario Remix II from the Mario series. Dragon Quest became so popular in Japan that, if asked to draw slime, a Japanese person is likely to draw a shape similar to that of the game's Slime creature.

Many aspects of pop culture reference Dragon Warrior. The video game music band Descendants of Erdrick, based in Austin, Texas, is named after the game's main character. On April Fools' Day 2012, Google added a Dragon Warrior-inspired 8-bit option to Google Maps.

In 2016, the spinoff Dragon Quest Builders was released as an alternate sequel to the first game. The story is set after the "bad ending" of the first game, where the Hero accepts the Dragonlord's offer to join him and rule half of the world.
