= Slime (Dragon Quest) =

Fictional species in the Dragon Quest video game franchise

- Dragon Quest character
- Artwork of a typical slime as it appears in the Dragon Quest series
- First game: Dragon Quest (1986)
- Created by: Yuji Horii
- Designed by: Akira Toriyama

Slimes (Japanese: スライム, Hepburn: Suraimu) are a fictional species of slime monster in the Dragon Quest role-playing video game franchise. Originally inspired by the game Wizardry to be a weak and common enemy for the 1986 video game Dragon Quest, Slimes have appeared in almost every Dragon Quest game since. Their popularity led to the appearance of many varieties of Slimes, including boss characters, friendly allies, and even emerging as the protagonist of their own spinoff series. Slimes have also appeared in other video game properties, including Nintendo's Mario and Super Smash Bros. series of crossover fighting games.

Their friendliness, limited power, and appealing form have caused the Slime to become a popular character and the mascot of the Dragon Quest series. It has also been placed on a multitude of different kinds of merchandise.

== Concept and design ==
"I was really hooked on 'Wizardy,' the PC game, ... There's...slime-looking characters ..., so I got the inspiration from it. I was doodling the slime-looking character and I took it to Mr. Toriyama, who did the character design, and he made it the Slime we see today."

— Yuji Horii

According to Yuji Horii, the creator of Dragon Quest, the inspiration for the Slimes came from the role-playing game series Wizardry. Horii said that when it was originally conceived, the Slime was "a pile of goo", but Akira Toriyama's design came back as a tear-drop which they considered "perfect". He later revealed that Toriyama originally drew a Slime in pixel art style, but he rejected it because it lacked the artist's personal style. Horii named the monsters in the game after receiving Toriyama's designs.

There are many different types of Slimes found throughout the Dragon Quest and Rocket Slime series. These include Slimes in different colors; She Slimes which are orange slimes that are slightly stronger than regular slimes and are despite their name, not always necessarily female; Bubble Slimes which look like pools of slime; Nautical Slimes that wear conch shells; Healslimes which have tentacles; gem-shaped Slimes like the Emperor Slime; cube-shaped Box Slimes; and King Slimes, which are very large Slimes wearing crowns and come in various versions such as regular or metal.

Artwork depicting a typical Metal Slime, which is identical in appearance to a baseline Slime except it has a silver metal body.

In addition, the Slime has a rare variant called the Metal Slime. Metal Slimes have multiple variants as well, including the Liquid Metal Slime and Metal King Slime. The Liquid Metal Slime is a bubbling puddle of metal slime with the Slime's face on it, while the Metal King Slime is a much larger Metal Slime wearing a crown. According to the book Dragon Quest Monsters, Liquid Metal Slimes derive from the Bubble Slime, which similarly is a puddle of slime. It tells a story of a Bubble Slime that helps a fairy, leading it to ask to live in the heavens, leading it to be purified with light. All Metal Slimes are noted for having limited health points, high speed, and high evasion, making it particularly difficult for the player to kill. It also has a high chance of fleeing the battle, explained by Horii as the monsters being shy. They are also rarely encountered. Upon being defeated, any characters present in battle gain a significant amount of experience, used to level up.

In most appearances of Slimes, the creature plays an antagonist role, and occasionally appears as a boss. In some Dragon Quest titles, Slimes also appear as friendly non-player characters and peaceful inhabitants of cities. Friendly Slimes usually greet players with the phrase, "I'm not a bad Slime!". Slimes, like many monsters in the Dragon Quest series, have a certain verbal tic, "slurp". Slimes also replace certain words or syllables with the word "goo" (e.g. "human" becomes "gooman"), or other words relating to Slime or goo, when they speak. In 2019, Slime was confirmed to be edible and tasted like lime.

== Appearances ==
The Slimes made their first appearance in Dragon Quest as the first and weakest enemy in the game, and have made similar appearances in all subsequent Dragon Quest titles. In Dragon Quest V, the monster is an easily recruitable ally that learns a variety of magic spells. Other Slimes are able to be recruited in this game, including Metal Slimes. Various Slimes can also be recruited in the spin-off series, Dragon Quest Monsters. Slimes are also the protagonists of their own spinoff series, beginning with Slime Mori Mori Dragon Quest, a Game Boy Advance title. It was followed by Dragon Quest Heroes: Rocket Slime, which was released worldwide for the Nintendo DS, and the Japanese-exclusive title, Slime Mori Mori Dragon Quest 3 for the Nintendo 3DS. These games follow a nation of Slimes who are intelligent and civilized, but also cute and somewhat comical. In the North American localization of the Dragon Quest games for the Nintendo DS, joking references and puns are made about Slimes. Slimes also appeared in several crossover games along with characters from Nintendo's Mario franchise, such as the Itadaki Street series. Slimes also appear in Super Smash Bros. Ultimate as a stage element on the Yggdrasil's Altar stage, as a Spirit, as a purchasable hat for Mii Fighters, and in one of the Hero's taunts and victory poses.

== Cultural impact ==
=== Promotion and merchandise ===
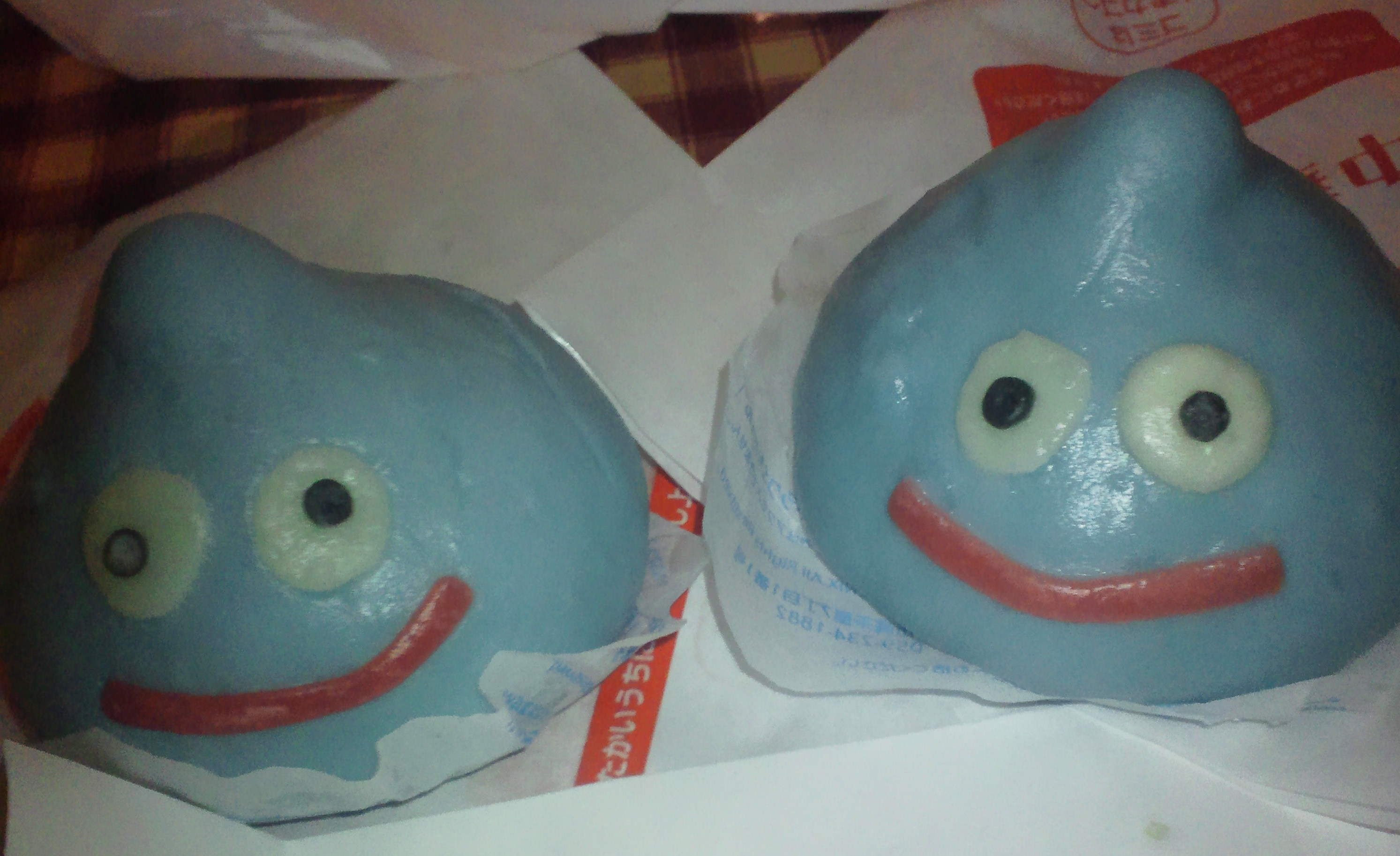
Slime nikuman buns

As the most recognizable symbol of one of the best-selling video game series in Japan, the Slime has been featured prominently in Dragon Quest-related merchandise. It has its own section called 'Smile Slime' on the Square Enix JP shopping website. Slime-themed merchandise includes plush toys, pencil cases, keychains, game controllers, a stylus, and several board games including one titled Dragon Quest Slime Racing. In Japan, pork filled steam buns designed to look like Slimes are common themed merchandise available for purchase. Convenience store chain Family Mart has added Slime on their food menu. For Dragon Quest's 25th anniversary, special items were sold including business cards, tote bags, and crystal figurines. In 2021, a Slime inspired ice packs, teapot and flair has been also made. There was also Slime gummies released. These gummies are typically blue, but rarely feature a Metal Slime-themed gummy that tastes like cola. Square Enix also created a brand of items called "Dragon Quest Zipang", which featured multiple traditional Japanese crafts, including Edo-Kiriko glassware that has a Metal Slime-themed option.

Members of the Metal Slime family have been featured in multiple pieces of merchandise, including apparel, figurines, and stuffed toys. The PlayStation 2 Slime-themed controller has a rare Metal Slime-themed version. A Metal Slime-themed PlayStation 4 was released in 2014, as well as a Metal Slime-themed PlayStation Vita, which included a small Liquid Metal Slime figure that plugged into the earphone jack. The release of the Metal Slime PlayStation 4 was associated with a significant boost in console sales in Japan. Non-video game electronics have also been released with Metal Slime theming, including an Android-based smartphone, a keyboard with 12 Metal Slime key toppers, and a laptop by Japanese retailer Tsukumo. Metal Slimes have also been used as part of different food and drink merchandise, including the energy drink brand ZONe Energy, and in collaboration with other companies, created food based on it. The Liquid Metal Slime has been a popular figurine according to Siliconera writer Jenni Lada. This variant has received multiple other pieces of merchandise, including an electric vacuum, an automated sensor figure, and a mouse. A New Nintendo 2DS XL was released with a Liquid Metal Slime on its lid.

The Metal Slime was featured in a commercial for the mobile game Dragon Quest Monsters: Super Light titled "Metal Slime Appears". It stars actress Rena Nōnen, who had been in previous commercials for the game, in silver clothing and a Metal Slime headpiece, which Nōnen describes as her favorite Dragon Quest monster. As part of this commercial, a giveaway was held, where one winner would receive the Metal Slime headgear she wore. A later commercial featuring Metal Slime was also aired, titled "Metal Slime Battle". According to Nōnen, she aimed to portray the Metal Slime as "nonchalant" to represent its agility despite herself being clumsy.

=== Reception ===
The Dragon Quest Slime has received positive reception from critics and fans, being called the "most prolific" of all the "memorable" monsters from the series and is one of the most recognizable characters in gaming. It has also been cited as one of the series' mascot. GamesRadar+ described it as the most lovable blob in video games, calling them the "equivalent of training wheels" due to how easy they are to defeat typically, but also saying that their weird smile makes players think twice about killing them. They stated that while they started out as nothing more than things for players to kill and not feel guilty about, the playable role of a Slime in the Dragon Quest Heroes series made them realize they were more than just generic enemies. Destructoid described the encounter of a Slime as one of "the iconic first enemy." Jenni Lada from Siliconera said that the best monster from the series is the Slime. She further stated that "they’re easy fodder for any beginner adventurer, and they look so silly with their blank expressions. There is not a single thought behind those eyes, and I love them for it." Matt Karoglou of GameRant has claimed that it was the biggest contribution to the Industry. He said that "in the world of RPGs, the Dragon Quest Slime reigns supreme as the most legendary and defining character from not just the series but the genre itself, making the creature an unmistakable piece of RPG iconography." William Cassidy of GameSpy claimed that "common wisdom is that if you ask someone from Japan to draw 'Slime', he'll draw the onion-like shape of the weak enemies from [Dragon Quest]."

==== Metal Slime reception ====
Futabanet writer Kurohachi described the Metal Slime family as a well-known Dragon Quest monster and one of its most distinctive, stating that hearing the name would make many players' hearts flutter. They believed that how helpful they are to leveling up in the Dragon Quest series likely made many players attached to them. He argued that it was the most iconic monster in the series, believing that the thrill of defeating a Metal Slime for the first time is unforgettable due to how difficult it is. Fellow Futabanet writer Jackie felt that encountering a Metal Slime is among the most exciting moments in the series, particularly the Liquid Metal Slime, which he believes was so exciting due to the amount of experience it gives.

In 1999, Nintendo Power nominated it as one of the best "bad guys" in video games. Siliconera writer Graham Russel picked the Liquid Metal Slime as his favorite Dragon Quest monster; he stated that he enjoyed it due to how much experience it gives upon being defeated, but liked it primarily due to enjoying the Liquid Metal Slime Japanese Nintendo 2DS and 3DS models. According to Magmix staff, fans of the series have found Metal Slime hunting in Dragon Quest III HD-2D Remake to be too easy, with staff citing the ability for one class in the game to learn the ability to guarantee critical hits and a new weapon that does guaranteed damage to multiple Metal Slimes. In another article, Magmix staff stated that, even if it feels like it has become easier, the Metal Slimes fleeing battle still made it a frustrating experience.

IGN Japan writer Takuya Watanabe believed that the gambling-like element involved in defeating Metal Slimes was a part of the thrill of fighting them, stating that it broke up the monotony of leveling up a character that was common in that time. Commenting on Metal Slimes in Dragon Quest I HD-2D Remake, he felt that hunting and fighting Metal Slime lacked the excitement he once had for it, citing a lack of special animation when they appear or effects when they are defeated. By comparison to later entries, Watanabe felt that it was monotonous and tedious, only sticking with it due to using a mod that prevented them from running away, which he felt made the process less frustrating yet not "dramatically" more enjoyable. The A.V. Club writer Jason Killingsworth described the Metal Slime as an "object of desire" rather than fear, stating that it serves to frustrate the players in part due to how it is nearly identical to a regular Slime despite being so difficult to kill. He discussed how managing to actually kill one, especially via a critical hit, stating that it triggered a "slot-machine jackpot of endorphins and experience points". Killingsworth argued that, to him, the Metal Slime represented contentment in life, being "close enough to grab but dances away with each attempt to grab hold".

=== Analysis ===
Reviewers have seen the Slime as symbolic of the Dragon Quest series in the same way that the Moogle represents Final Fantasy. Dragon Quest creator Yuji Horii speculated that the popularity of the Slimes may come from its cuteness, how it is easy to defeat, and while the protagonists change in every Dragon Quest game, the Slimes are always there. GamesRadar+ speculated that the intense "grinding", or fighting of enemies in the Dragon Quest series exposed players to an abundance of Slimes, but a positive association was created by their familiarity. Yoshiki Watabe, producer of Dragon Quest VIII, hypothesized its popularity came from it being a "well designed character", but "simple", being accessible to anyone.
