= List of Dragon Quest media =

Franchise of video games and media

Dragon Quest is a series of role-playing video games created by Yuji Horii, which are published by Square Enix (formerly Enix). The first game of the series was released in Japan in 1986 on the Nintendo Entertainment System, and Dragon Quest games have subsequently been localized for markets in North America, Europe and Australia, on over a dozen video game consoles. In addition to traditional role-playing games, the series includes first-person adventure games, portable games, massively multiplayer online role-playing games, and games for mobile phones. Dragon Quest is Square Enix's second most successful franchise internationally behind the Final Fantasy franchise, having sold over 78 million units worldwide to date. It has been cited as Japan's most popular and favorite gaming series by many publications.

The original game in the series, renamed Dragon Warrior outside Japan, was released in 1986 in Japan and in North America in 1989. Dragon Quest games are released in Japan and, until 2004's Dragon Quest VIII, were later localized for the North American market under the Dragon Warrior title. That game was also the first main series game to be released outside Japan and North America. In addition to the 11 games released as part of the main (numbered) series and their many spin-offs and related titles, the Dragon Quest series has spawned many works in other media including anime, movies, novels and manga, and radio dramas. Many games, particularly the main series, have soundtrack album releases featuring their music in different arrangements. Square Enix has also released companion books for its games, which provide additional backstory and plot information, as well as detailed strategy guides. The majority of the games and media related to the series have only been released in Japan, although the series began to see more international popularity beginning in the 2010s.

== Video games ==
=== Main series ===
Main series
| Title | Original release date | | |
| Title | Japan | North America | PAL region |
|---|---|---|---|
| Dragon Quest | May 27, 1986 | August 1989 | September 11, 2014 (Android & iOS) |
Notes: Released on Nintendo Entertainment System; Originally released in Japan under the title Doragon Kuesuto (ドラゴンクエスト, Dragon Quest), and in North America under the title Dragon Warrior; Also available on MSX (1986), MSX2 (1986), PC-9801 (1986), Super Famicom (1993), Game Boy Color (1999), Satellaview (1998), mobile phones (2004), Wii (2011), Android (2013), iOS (2013), PlayStation 4 (2017), Nintendo 3DS (2017) and Nintendo Switch (2019)
| Dragon Quest II | January 26, 1987 | September 1990 | October 9, 2014 (Android & iOS) |
Notes: Released on Nintendo Entertainment System; Originally released in Japan under the title Dragon Quest II: Akuryo no Kamigami (ドラゴンクエストII 悪霊の神々, Dragon Quest II: Gods of the Evil Spirits), and in North America under the title Dragon Warrior II; Also available on MSX (1988), MSX2 (1988), Super Famicom (1993), Game Boy Color (1999), mobile phones (2005), Wii (2011), Android (2014), iOS (2014), PlayStation 4 (2017), Nintendo 3DS (2017) and Nintendo Switch (2019)
| Dragon Quest III | February 10, 1988 | March 1992 | December 4, 2014 (Android & iOS) |
Notes: Released on Nintendo Entertainment System; Originally released in Japan under the title Dragon Quest III: Soshite Densetsu e... (ドラゴンクエストIII そして伝説へ..., Dragon Quest III: And thus into Legend...), and in North America under the title Dragon Warrior III; Also available on Super Famicom (1996), Game Boy Color (2000), mobile phones (2009), Wii (2011), Android (2014), iOS (2014), PlayStation 4 (2017), Nintendo 3DS (2017) and Nintendo Switch (2019); A remake for modern consoles, titled Dragon Quest III HD-2D Remake and developed by AMATA K.K. under the supervision of Team Asano, the producers at Square Enix behind Bravely Default and Octopath Traveler, was released on November 14, 2024.
| Dragon Quest IV | February 11, 1990 | October 1992 | September 11, 2008 (Nintendo DS) |
Notes: Released on Nintendo Entertainment System; Originally released in Japan under the title Dragon Quest IV: Michibikareshi Monotachi (ドラゴンクエストIV 導かれし者たち, Dragon Quest IV: The Guided Ones), and in North America under the title Dragon Warrior IV; Released in Europe as Dragon Quest: The Chapters of the Chosen; Also available on PlayStation (2001), Nintendo DS (2007), Android (2014) and iOS (2014)
| Dragon Quest V | September 27, 1992 | February 16, 2009 (Nintendo DS) | February 20, 2009 (Nintendo DS) |
Notes: Released on Super Famicom; Originally released in Japan under the title Dragon Quest V: Tenkū no Hanayome (ドラゴンクエストV 天空の花嫁, Dragon Quest V: The Heavenly Bride); Released in Europe as Dragon Quest: The Hand of the Heavenly Bride; Also available on PlayStation 2 (2004), Nintendo DS (2008), Android (2014) and iOS (2014)
| Dragon Quest VI | December 9, 1995 | February 14, 2011 (Nintendo DS) | May 20, 2011 (Nintendo DS) |
Notes: Released on Super Famicom; Originally released in Japan under the title Dragon Quest VI: Maboroshi no Daichi (ドラゴンクエストVI 幻の大地, Dragon Quest VI: Land of Illusion); Released in Europe as Dragon Quest VI: Realms of Reverie; Also available on Nintendo DS (2010), Android (2015) and iOS (2015)
| Dragon Quest VII | August 26, 2000 | October 31, 2001 | September 16, 2016 (Nintendo 3DS) |
Notes: Released on PlayStation; Originally released in Japan under the title Dragon Quest VII: Eden no Senshitachi (ドラゴンクエストVII エデンの戦士たち, Dragon Quest VII: Warriors of Eden) and in North American under the title Dragon Warrior VII and later as Dragon Quest VII: Fragments of the Forgotten Past; Also available on Nintendo 3DS (2013), Android (2015) and iOS (2015)
| Dragon Quest VIII | November 27, 2004 | November 15, 2005 | April 13, 2006 |
Notes: Released on PlayStation 2; Originally released in Japan under the title Dragon Quest VIII: Sora to Umi to Daichi to Norowareshi Himegimi (ドラゴンクエストVIII 空と海と大地と呪われし姫君, Dragon Quest VIII: The Sky, the Ocean, the Earth, and the Cursed Princess); The first main series game to be released in North America under the original name Dragon Quest; Released in Europe as Dragon Quest VIII: Journey of the Cursed King; Also available on Android (2013), iOS (2013) and Nintendo 3DS (2015)
| Dragon Quest IX | July 11, 2009 | July 11, 2010 | July 23, 2010 |
Notes: Released on Nintendo DS; Originally released in Japan under the title Dragon Quest IX: Hoshizora no Mamoribito (ドラゴンクエストIX 星空の守り人, Dragon Quest IX: Guardians of the Starry Skies); Released in North America as Dragon Quest IX: Sentinels of the Starry Skies; The first main series game to feature multiplayer
| Dragon Quest X | August 2, 2012 | none | none |
Notes: Initially released on the Wii; Released in Japan under the title Dragon Quest X: Mezameshi Itsutsu no Shuzoku Onrain (ドラゴンクエストX 目覚めし五つの種族 オンライン, Dragon Quest X: Awakening of the Five Tribes Online); First game in the series to not be developed by an external development company but instead developed internally at Square Enix, which continued on the main series since then; The first massively multiplayer online role-playing game in the series; Also available on the Wii U, Windows, Android (2013), Nintendo 3DS (2014), and Nintendo Switch (2017); An expansion, also called the second version of the game, titled Dragon Quest X: Nemureru Yūsha to Michibiki no Meiyū Online (ドラゴンクエストX 眠れる勇者と導きの盟友 オンライン, Dragon Quest X: The Sleeping Hero and the Guided Ally Online), was released in Japan in 2013; A second expansion, titled Dragon Quest X: Inishie no Ryuu no Denshou Online (ドラゴンクエストX いにしえの竜の伝承 オンライン, Dragon Quest X: Lore of the Ancient Dragon Online), was released in Japan in 2015; A third expansion, titled Dragon Quest X: 5000-nen no Harukanaru Kokyou e Online (ドラゴンクエストX 5000年の旅路 遥かなる故郷へ オンライン, Dragon Quest X: The 5,000 Year Journey to a Faraway Hometown Online), was released in Japan in 2017; A fourth expansion, titled Dragon Quest X: Ibara no Miko to Horobi no Kami Online (ドラゴンクエストX いばらの巫女と滅びの神 オンライン, Dragon Quest X: The Maiden of Thorns and the God of Destruction Online), was released in Japan in 2019; A fifth expansion, titled Dragon Quest X: Tensei no Eiyuu-tachi Online (ドラゴンクエストX天星の英雄たち オンライン, Dragon Quest X: Heroes of the Heavenly Stars Online), was released in Japan in 2021; A sixth expansion, titled Dragon Quest X: Mirai e no Tobira to Madoromi no Shoujo Online (ドラゴンクエストX 未来への扉とまどろみの少女 オンライン, Dragon Quest X: The Slumbering Girl and the Door to the Future Online), was released in 2024.; A single-player remake with a chibi artstyle titled Dragon Quest X Offline was released in Japan in 2022.
| Dragon Quest XI | July 29, 2017 | September 4, 2018 | September 4, 2018 |
Notes: Released on PlayStation 4 and Windows. A Nintendo 3DS version was also released exclusively in Japan; Originally released in Japan under the title Dragon Quest XI: Sugisarishi Toki o Motomete (ドラゴンクエストXI 過ぎ去りし時を求めて, Dragon Quest XI: In Search of Passing Time); Released in North America as Dragon Quest XI: Echoes of an Elusive Age; An expanded version, Dragon Quest XI S, was released on Nintendo Switch in 2019. In 2020, the expanded version was also released on PlayStation 4, Xbox One, Windows and Stadia
| Dragon Quest XII | TBA | TBA | TBA |
Notes: The full title is Dragon Quest XII: Beyond Dreams; Originally announced as Dragon Quest XII: The Flames of Fate in 2021; First simultaneous worldwide release of a main series game

=== Spin-offs ===
==== Dragon Quest Monsters ====
Dragon Quest Monsters (ドラゴンクエストモンスターズ, Doragon Kuesuto Monsutāzu), initially known as Dragon Warrior Monsters in North America, is a series of Dragon Quest games focused on capturing, breeding, and raising monsters to do battle, similar to Pokémon games.

Dragon Quest Monsters games
| Title | Original release date | | |
| Title | Japan | North America | PAL region |
|---|---|---|---|
| Dragon Warrior Monsters | September 25, 1998 | January 27, 2000 | January 25, 1999 |
Notes: Released on the Game Boy Color; Originally released in Japan under the title Doragon Kuesuto Monsutāzu: Terī no Wandārando (ドラゴンクエストモンスターズ テリーのワンダーランド, Dragon Quest Monsters: Terry's Wonderland); The first Dragon Quest game to be released in Europe; Features the characters Terry and Milly from Dragon Quest VI; Also available on PlayStation (2002, as Dragon Quest Monsters 1+2), mobile phones (2002), and Nintendo 3DS (2012, as Dragon Quest Monsters: Terry's Wonderland 3D)
| Dragon Warrior Monsters 2 | March 9, 2001 | September 15, 2001 | none |
Notes: Released on the Game Boy Color; Originally released in Japan under the title Doragon Kuesuto Monsutaazu 2: Maruta no Fushigi na Kagi (ドラゴンクエストモンスターズ2 マルタのふしぎな鍵, Dragon Quest Monsters 2: Wonderland Key to Malta); Composed of two different versions of the game: Cobi's Journey and Tara's Adventure (released as Ruka no Tabidachi (ルカの旅立ち, Ruca's Journey) and Iru no Bōken (イルの冒険, Iru's Adventure) in Japan); Also available on PlayStation (2002, as Dragon Quest Monsters 1+2), and Nintendo 3DS (2014, as Dragon Quest Monsters 2: Iru and Luca's Marvelous Mysterious Key)
| Dragon Quest Monsters: Caravan Heart | March 29, 2003 | none | none |
Notes: Released on the Game Boy Advance; Features the character Prince Kiefer from Dragon Quest VII
| Dragon Quest Monsters: Joker | December 28, 2006 | November 6, 2007 | March 14, 2008 |
Notes: Released on the Nintendo DS
| Dragon Quest Monsters: Joker 2 | April 28, 2010 | September 19, 2011 | October 7, 2011 |
Notes: Released on the Nintendo DS; Re-released in an expanded form in Japan on the Nintendo DS as Dragon Quest Monsters: Joker 2 Professional
| Dragon Quest Monsters: Wanted! | November 24, 2010 | none | none |
Notes: Released on mobile phones; Also available on mobile phones (2011), Android (2011), and iOS (2014)
| Dragon Quest Monsters: Super Light | January 23, 2014 | none | none |
Notes: Released on Android and iOS
| Dragon Quest Monsters: Joker 3 | March 24, 2016 | none | none |
Notes: Released on the Nintendo 3DS; Expanded version Dragon Quest Monsters: Joker 3 Professional released in 2017
| Dragon Quest Monsters: The Dark Prince | December 1, 2023 | December 1, 2023 | December 1, 2023 |
Notes: First released on the Nintendo Switch and later for Windows, iOS, and Android

==== Mystery Dungeon ====
Mystery Dungeon (不思議のダンジョン, Fushigi no Dungeon) is a series of roguelike video games. There are several games in the series based on Dragon Quest, as well as on other series such as Pokémon.

Mystery Dungeon games
| Title | Original release date | | |
| Title | Japan | North America | PAL region |
|---|---|---|---|
| Torneko's Great Adventure: Mystery Dungeon | September 19, 1993 | September 19, 2026 (Classic HD) | September 19, 2026 (Classic HD) |
Notes: Released in Japan on Super Famicom; Loosely translates as Torneko's Great Adventure: Mysterious Dungeon; Features Torneko (Taloon, in North America), the merchant from Dragon Quest IV; Re-released worldwide as Dragon Quest Heroes: Torneko's Mystery Dungeon -Classic HD- in 2026 for Nintendo Switch, Nintendo Switch 2, PlayStation 5, Windows, and Xbox Series X/S
| Torneko: The Last Hope | September 15, 1999 | November 15, 2000 | none |
Notes: Released on PlayStation; Originally released in Japan under the title Dragon Quest Characters: Torneko no Daibōken 2 – Fushigi no Dungeon (ドラゴンクエスト・キャラクターズ トルネコの大冒険2 ～不思議のダンジョン～, Dragon Quest Characters: Torneko's Great Adventure 2 – The Mysterious Dungeon); Features Torneko, the merchant from Dragon Quest IV; Also available on Game Boy Advance (2001, as Dragon Quest Characters: Torneko no Daibōken 2 Advance)
| Torneko's Great Adventure 3 | October 31, 2002 | none | none |
Notes: Released on PlayStation 2; Features Torneko, the merchant from Dragon Quest IV; Ported to the Game Boy Advance in 2004 as Torneko's Great Adventure 3 Advance
| Dragon Quest: Young Yangus and the Mystery Dungeon | April 20, 2006 | none | none |
Notes: Released on PlayStation 2; Features Yangus, one of the playable characters of Dragon Quest VIII

==== Slime ====
Slime MoriMori Dragon Quest (スライムもりもりドラゴンクエスト, Suraimu Morimori Doragon Kuesuto; lit. 'Slime of Gusto Dragon Quest') is a series of Dragon Quest action-adventure games starring the Slime, a common enemy and mascot of the series.

Slime games
| Title | Original release date | | |
| Title | Japan | North America | PAL region |
|---|---|---|---|
| Slime Mori Mori Dragon Quest | November 14, 2003 | none | none |
Notes: Released on Game Boy Advance; Translates as Slime of Gusto Dragon Quest
| Dragon Quest Heroes: Rocket Slime | December 1, 2005 | September 19, 2006 | none |
Notes: Released on the Nintendo DS; Originally released in Japan as Slime Mori Mori Dragon Quest 2
| Slime Mori Mori Dragon Quest 3 | November 2, 2011 | none | none |
Notes: Released on Nintendo 3DS

==== Monster Battle Road ====
Dragon Quest: Monster Battle Road is a series of arcade and video games focused on collecting real-life cards with monster data imprinted on them and using them to battle opponents.

Monster Battle Road games
| Title | Original release date | | |
| Title | Japan | North America | PAL region |
|---|---|---|---|
| Dragon Quest: Monster Battle Road | June 2007 | none | none |
Notes: Released as an arcade game
| Dragon Quest: Monster Battle Road II Legends | September 11, 2009 | none | none |
Notes: Released as an arcade game
| Dragon Quest: Monster Battle Road Victory | July 15, 2010 | none | none |
Notes: Released on Wii
| Dragon Quest: Monster Battle Road Scanner | June 23, 2016 | none | none |
Notes: Released as an arcade game

==== The Adventure of Dai ====
A project focused on three games based on the 2020 anime adaptation of the Dragon Quest: The Adventure of Dai manga.

Dragon Quest: The Adventure of Dai games
| Title | Original release date | | |
| Title | Japan | North America | PAL region |
|---|---|---|---|
| Dragon Quest The Adventure of Dai: A Hero's Bonds | September 28, 2021 | September 28, 2021 | September 28, 2021 |
Notes: Released on mobile devices; Developed by DeNA; Service closed on April 26, 2023
| Dragon Quest: The Adventure of Dai - Xross Blade | October 22, 2020 | none | none |
Notes: Arcade card game
| Infinity Strash: Dragon Quest The Adventure of Dai | September 28, 2023 | September 28, 2023 | September 28, 2023 |
Notes: Action role-playing game for PlayStation 4, PlayStation 5, Nintendo Switch, Xbox Series X/S, and Windows; Developed by Game Studio and Kai Graphics

==== Other ====
Other games
| Title | Original release date | | |
| Title | Japan | North America | PAL region |
|---|---|---|---|
| Kenshin Dragon Quest: Yomigaerishi Densetsu no Ken | September 19, 2003 | none | none |
Notes: Released as a television game
| Dragon Quest Swords: The Masked Queen and the Tower of Mirrors | July 12, 2007 | February 19, 2008 | May 9, 2008 |
Notes: Released on the Wii
| Dragon Quest Wars | June 24, 2009 | September 28, 2009 | October 9, 2009 |
Notes: Released on the Nintendo DSi as DSiWare
| Dragon Quest Monster Parade | September 2, 2013 | none | none |
Notes: Released for web browsers; Also available on Android and iOS (2015)
| Dragon Quest Heroes: The World Tree's Woe and the Blight Below | February 26, 2015 | October 13, 2015 | October 16, 2015 |
Notes: Released on the PlayStation 3, PlayStation 4, Windows, and Nintendo Switch
| Theatrhythm Dragon Quest | March 26, 2015 | none | none |
Notes: Released on the Nintendo 3DS
| Dragon Quest of the Stars | October 15, 2015 | February 25, 2020 | February 25, 2020 |
Notes: Released on Android and iOS
| Dragon Quest Builders | January 28, 2016 | October 11, 2016 | October 14, 2016 |
Notes: Released on the PlayStation 3, PlayStation 4, PlayStation Vita, Windows, and Nintendo Switch
| Dragon Quest Heroes II | May 27, 2016 | April 25, 2017 | April 28, 2017 |
Notes: Released on the PlayStation 3, PlayStation 4, PlayStation Vita, Windows, and Nintendo Switch
| Dragon Quest Rivals | November 2, 2017 | none | none |
Notes: Released on iOS, Android, Nintendo Switch and Windows; Later rebranded to Dragon Quest Rivals Ace in 2020.; Ended service in 2021.
| Dragon Quest Builders 2 | December 20, 2018 | July 12, 2019 | July 12, 2019 |
Notes: Released on the PlayStation 4, Nintendo Switch, Windows, and Xbox One; Developed by Omega Force
| Dragon Quest Walk | September 12, 2019 | none | none |
Notes: Released on Android and iOS; Developed by Colopl; AR mobile game similar to Pokémon Go and Ingress
| Dragon Quest Tact | July 16, 2020 | January 27, 2021 | January 27, 2021 |
Notes: Released on Android and iOS; Developed by Aiming Inc.; Tactical role-playing game
| Dragon Quest Keshi Keshi | December 1, 2021 | none | none |
Notes: Released on Android and iOS; A puzzle game developed by NHN PlayArt
| Dragon Quest Treasures | December 9, 2022 | December 9, 2022 | December 9, 2022 |
Notes: Released for the Nintendo Switch; Developed by Tose; Features the siblings Erik and Mia from Dragon Quest XI in their childhood
| Dragon Quest Champions | June 13, 2023 | none | none |
Notes: Released on iOS, Android; Developed by Omega Force; The game was shut down on July 30, 2024
| Dragon Quest Smash/Grow | April 21, 2026 | April 21, 2026 | April 21, 2026 |
Notes: Released on iOS, Android; Developed by KLabGames; Roguelite
| Dragon Quest RPG: The Cursed Tree and the Chosen Isle | 2027 | 2027 | 2027 |
Notes: Released on iOS, Android; Developed by Wright Flyer Studios; Tactical role-playing game

== Television and film ==
Television and film
| Title | Original release date | | |
| Title | Japan | North America | PAL region |
|---|---|---|---|
| Dragon Quest Fantasia Video | 1988 | none | none |
Notes: Recording of a stage version of Dragon Quest II published by Enix and Tohokushinsha Film
| Dragon Quest | December 2, 1989 | 1990 | none |
Notes: 43-episode anime television series; American broadcast was of the first 13 episodes; Released on DVD in 2006
| Dragon Quest: The Adventure of Dai | October 17, 1991 | October 3, 2020 | none |
Notes: Translates to Dragon Quest – Dai's Great Adventure; 46-episode anime television series; Based on manga series by the same name; A new anime adaptation began in October 2020
| Dragon Quest Biography: Emblem of Roto | April 20, 1996 | none | none |
Notes: Translates to Dragon Quest Biography: Emblem of Roto; 45-minute, theatrically released anime film; Based on manga series by the same name
| Dragon Quest Ballet | August 21, 2002 | none | none |
Notes: Recording of a performance by the Star Dancers Ballet published by SME Visual Works; Based on Dragon Quest I, the ballet was first performed in 1995
| Dragon Quest: Your Story | August 2, 2019 | February 13, 2020 | none |
Notes: Based on Dragon Quest V, the movie is an adaptation of the game with a few changes

== Books and manga ==
Books and manga
| Game | Details |
|---|---|
| Dragon Quest Game Books 1988–96 – Book | Notes: Part of the Enix Original Game Book series, which are similar to the Choose Your Own Adventure books. There are multiple volumes that cover the first six games in the series, as well as Torneko no Daibōken: Fushigi no Dungeon; Dragon Quest I Game Book (ゲームブック ドラゴンクエストI, 1989, (JP) ISBN 978-4-900527-16-4 and (JP) ISBN 978-4-900527-15-7); Dragon Quest II Game Book (ゲームブック ドラゴンクエストII, 1989, (JP) ISBN 978-4-900527-13-3 and (JP) ISBN 978-4-900527-14-0); Dragon Quest III Game Book (ゲームブック ドラゴンクエストIII, 1988, (JP) ISBN 978-4-900527-04-1, (JP) ISBN 978-4-900527-05-8, and (JP) ISBN 978-4-900527-06-5); Dragon Quest IV Game Book (ゲームブック ドラゴンクエストIV, 1990, (JP) ISBN 978-4-900527-50-8, (JP) ISBN 978-4-900527-51-5, (JP) ISBN 978-4-900527-52-2, and (JP) ISBN 978-4-900527-53-9); Dragon Quest V Game Book (ゲームブック ドラゴンクエストV, 1993, (JP) ISBN 978-4-87025-720-7, (JP) ISBN 978-4-87025-721-4, (JP) ISBN 978-4-87025-722-1, and (JP) ISBN 978-4-87025-723-8); Dragon Quest VI Game Book (ゲームブック ドラゴンクエストVI, 1996, (JP) ISBN 978-4-87025-880-8, (JP) ISBN 978-4-87025-881-5, (JP) ISBN 978-4-87025-891-4, and (JP) ISBN 978-4-87025-892-1); Torneko no Daibōken Game Book (ゲームブック トルネコの大冒険, 1994, (JP) ISBN 978-4-87025-747-4, (JP) ISBN 978-4-87025-759-7, and (JP) ISBN 978-4-87025-804-4) |
| Legend in the Dark series 1988–94 – Book | Notes: Collections of illustrated short stories about characters from the games; Dragon Quest III Legend in the Dark (ドラゴンクエストIII知られざる伝説) (1988) (JP) ISBN 978-4-900527-00-3; Dragon Quest IV Legend in the Dark (ドラゴンクエストIV知られざる伝説) (1990) (JP) ISBN 978-4-900527-48-5; Roto: Dragon Quest Legend in the Dark 2 (ドラゴンクエスト知られざる伝説ロト2) (1992) (JP) ISBN 978-4-900527-82-9; Dragon Quest V Legend in the Dark (ドラゴンクエストV知られざる伝説) (1994) (JP) ISBN 978-4-87025-775-7 |
| Dragon Quest Master's Club 1988–91 – Book | Notes: Collections of fan art based on all of the games released up to that book; Dragon Quest III Master's Club (ドラゴンクエストIII マスターズクラブ) (1988, (JP) ISBN 978-4-8806-3487-6); Dragon Quest IV Master's Club (ドラゴンクエストIV マスターズクラブ) (1991, (JP) ISBN 978-4-7966-0084-2) |
| Dragon Quest novelizations 1989–2001 – Book | Notes: Novelizations of games in the series; Books have been republished in multiple formats, often split across multiple volumes; Dragon Quest I – Hideo Takayashiki; 1989, (JP) ISBN 978-4-900527-07-2; 1991, (JP) ISBN 978-4-900527-74-4; 2000, (JP) ISBN 978-4-7575-0243-7; Dragon Quest II – Hideo Takayashiki; 1989, (JP) ISBN 978-4-900527-17-1, (JP) ISBN 978-4-900527-18-8; 1991, (JP) ISBN 978-4-900527-77-5; 2000, (JP) ISBN 978-4-7575-0244-4; Dragon Quest III – Hideo Takayashiki; 1990, (JP) ISBN 978-4-900527-41-6, (JP) ISBN 978-4-900527-42-3; 1991, (JP) ISBN 978-4-900527-72-0, (JP) ISBN 978-4-900527-73-7; 2000, (JP) ISBN 978-4-7575-0252-9; Dragon Quest IV – Saori Kumi; 1991, (JP) ISBN 978-4-900527-61-4, (JP) ISBN 978-4-900527-62-1, (JP) ISBN 978-4-900527-63-8, (JP) ISBN 978-4-900527-65-2; 1992, (JP) ISBN 978-4-900527-95-9, (JP) ISBN 978-4-900527-96-6, (JP) ISBN 978-4-900527-97-3, (JP) ISBN 978-4-900527-98-0; 2000, (JP) ISBN 978-4-7575-0304-5, (JP) ISBN 978-4-7575-0305-2, (JP) ISBN 978-4-7575-0306-9; Dragon Quest V – Saori Kumi; 1993, (JP) ISBN 978-4-87025-712-2, (JP) ISBN 978-4-87025-713-9, (JP) ISBN 978-4-87025-714-6; 1994, (JP) ISBN 978-4-87025-772-6, (JP) ISBN 978-4-87025-773-3, (JP) ISBN 978-4-87025-774-0; 2000, (JP) ISBN 978-4-7575-0307-6, (JP) ISBN 978-4-7575-0308-3, (JP) ISBN 978-4-7575-0309-0; Dragon Quest VI – Saori Kumi; 1996, (JP) ISBN 978-4-87025-882-2, (JP) ISBN 978-4-87025-889-1; 1997, (JP) ISBN 978-4-87025-955-3, (JP) ISBN 978-4-87025-956-0, (JP) ISBN 978-4-87025-957-7; 2000, (JP) ISBN 978-4-7575-0234-5, (JP) ISBN 978-4-7575-0235-2, (JP) ISBN 978-4-7575-0236-9; Dragon Quest VII – Hiroyuki Domon; 2001, (JP) ISBN 978-4-7575-0407-3, (JP) ISBN 978-4-7575-0457-8, (JP) ISBN 978-4-7575-0458-5; 2004, with illustrations by Daisuke Torii, (JP) ISBN 978-4-7575-1199-6, (JP) ISBN 978-4-7575-1200-9, (JP) ISBN 978-4-7575-1201-6; Torneko no Daibōken: Fushigi no Dungeon – Yumiko Tsukamoto; 2001, (JP) ISBN 978-4-87025-767-2 |
| Dragon Quest Monster Story July 31, 1989 – Book | Notes: Book of stories based on the enemies of the series; (JP) ISBN 978-4-900527-08-9 |
| Dragon Quest Item Story December 21, 1989 – Book | Notes: Book of stories based on the items of the series; (JP) ISBN 978-4-900527-24-9 |
| Perfect Collection Dragon Quest 1990–97 – Book | Notes: Series of books containing artwork, interviews, and guides for the series; Perfect Collection Dragon Quest 1990 (ドラゴンクエストパーフェクトコレクション1990, (JP) ISBN 978-4-900527-25-6); Perfect Collection Dragon Quest Summer Vacation (ドラゴンクエストパーフェクトコレクション夏休み号, 1990 (JP) ISBN 978-4-900527-39-3); Perfect Collection Dragon Quest 1991 (ドラゴンクエストパーフェクトコレクション1991 (JP) ISBN 978-4-900527-55-3); Perfect Collection Dragon Quest 1992 (ドラゴンクエストパーフェクトコレクション1992 (JP) ISBN 978-4-900527-80-5); Perfect Collection Dragon Quest 1993 (ドラゴンクエストパーフェクトコレクション1993 (JP) ISBN 978-4-87025-702-3); Perfect Collection Dragon Quest 1995 (ドラゴンクエストパーフェクトコレクション1995 (JP) ISBN 978-4-87025-788-7); Perfect Collection Dragon Quest 1996 (ドラゴンクエストパーフェクトコレクション1996 (JP) ISBN 978-4-87025-855-6); Perfect Collection Dragon Quest 1997 (ドラゴンクエストパーフェクトコレクション1997 (JP) ISBN 978-4-87025-929-4) |
| Dragon Quest: Legend of the Rubis Spirit 1990–92 – Book | Notes: Original novel in three volumes based on the Dragon Quest series by Saori Kumi; Title in Japanese is Doragon Kuesuto: Seirei Rubisu Densetsu (ドラゴンクエスト 精霊ルビス伝説); 1990 – (JP) ISBN 978-4-900527-27-0, (JP) ISBN 978-4-900527-28-7, and (JP) ISBN 978-4-900527-29-4; 1992 – (JP) ISBN 978-4-900527-84-3, (JP) ISBN 978-4-900527-85-0, and (JP) ISBN 978-4-900527-86-7 |
| Dragon Quest 4Koma Manga 1990–2003 – Manga | Notes: 4koma manga featuring various characters from the Dragon Quest series; Consists of several series of books; Dragon Quest 4Koma Manga Gekijou (18 volumes); Dragon Quest 4Koma Manga Gekijou Extra (20 volumes); Dragon Quest 4Koma Manga Gekijou Gangan (12 volumes); Dragon Quest 4koma Manga; Dragon Quest 4koma Manga Daizenshuu (3 volumes); Dragon Quest 4Koma Manga 1P Gekijou (8 volumes); Dragon Quest III 4Koma; Dragon Quest IV 4Koma; Dragon Quest V 4Koma (3 volumes); Dragon Quest VII 4Koma (8 volumes); Dragon Quest VIII 4Koma (3 volumes); Dragon Quest IX 4Koma; Torneco no Daibouken 4koma (4 volumes); Torneco no Daibouken 2 4koma (2 volumes); Dragon Quest Characters: Torneko no Daibouken 3 Mystery Dungeon 4koma (2 volumes); Dragon Quest Monsters Terry's Wonderland 4Koma (5 volumes); Dragon Quest Monsters 2 4Koma (3 volumes); Dragon Quest Monsters Caravan Heart 4Koma |
| The Road to Dragon Quest January 31, 1990 – Manga | Notes: One-volume manga detailing the development of Dragon Quest; Designed by Hiroyuki Takizawa and drawn by Shotaro Ishinomori |
| Dragon Quest IV Monsters September 28, 1990 – Book | Notes: Book of stories based on the enemies of Dragon Quest IV |
| Dragon Quest Retsuden: Roto no Monshō 1991–97 – Manga | Notes: Written by Junji Koyanagi and Chiaki Kawamata, concept by Kamui Fujiwara; 21 issues; Translates as Dragon Quest Biography: Emblem of Roto |
| Dragon Quest IV: World Travel Sketches April 12, 1991 – Book | Notes: A collection of illustrated short stories; (JP) ISBN 978-4-900527-64-5 |
| Dragon Quest Game Land 1993–94 – Book | Notes: Six-volume set of children's game books; (JP) ISBN 978-4-87025-735-1, (JP) ISBN 978-4-87025-736-8, (JP) ISBN 978-4-87025-737-5, (JP) ISBN 978-4-87025-748-1, (JP) ISBN 978-4-87025-756-6, (JP) ISBN 978-4-87025-790-0 |
| Dragon Quest: Legend of the Rubis Spirit 1993–95 – Manga | Notes: Adapted from same name novel; Drawing by Yutaka Abe; 7 issues |
| Adventure story of Torneko Family 1995–97 – Manga | Notes: Written by Yasuhiro Komatsuzaki and Yuji Horii; 4 issues |
| Dragon Quest – Maboroshi no Daichi 1997–2001 – Manga | Notes: Written by Masaomi Kanzaki and Yuji Horii; 10 issues; Based on Dragon Quest VI |
| Dragon Quest: Virtual Butler Jin 1997–98 – Manga | Notes: Written by Machiko Ocha; 3 issues |
| Dragon Quest: Princess Alena 1998–2000 – Manga | Notes: Written by Mamiko Yasaka and Yasuhiro Komatsuzaki; 5 issues; Based on Dragon Quest IV Chapter March 2 of the Capricious Princess |
| Dragon Quest Tenkuu Monogatari 1998–2004 – Manga | Notes: Written by Chino Yukimiya; Translates to Dragon Quest Sky Story; Features the children from Dragon Quest V; 11 issues |
| Encyclopedia Seal Collection – Dragon Quest Monsters: Terry's Wonderland March 19, 1999 – Book | Notes: Encyclopedia of the contents of Dragon Quest Monsters; (JP) ISBN 978-4-7575-0017-4 |
| Dragon Quest Monsters + 2000–03 – Manga | Notes: Written by Mine Yoshizaki; 5 issues; Follows the various slime characters of the series; Republished in 2012; Published in English by Seven Seas Entertainment |
| Dragon Quest VII Warriors of Eden 2001–06 – Manga | Notes: Written by Kamui Fujiwara; 14 issues; Based on Dragon Quest VII |
| Dragon Quest IV Gaiden: Infernal Labyrinth August 7, 2002 – Manga | Notes: Written by Inada Koji; Features side-story to Dragon Quest IV; Also include Koji's 1990 manga series Dragon Quest I Secret: Dragonload Baribari Team (Dorakue Wan Hiden Ryūō Baribari Tai) |
| Dragon Quest: Dai no Daibōken 1989–96 – Manga | Notes: 37 issues; Written by Riku Sanjo and Yuji Horii; Republished between 2020 and 2021 in 25 issues; Published in English by Viz Media |
| Dragon Quest Retsuden: Roto no Monshō Returns 2005 – Manga | Notes: Side-story to Dragon Quest Retsuden: Roto no Monshō |
| Dragon Quest Retsuden: Roto no Monshō ~Monshō o Tsugumono-tachi e~ 2005–present – Manga | Notes: Translates as Dragon Quest Biography: Emblem of Roto: Those Who Inherit the Emblem; Sequel to Dragon Quest Retsuden: Roto no Monshō |
| Dragon Quest: Sōten no Soura 2013–2022 – Manga | Notes: Features side-story to Dragon Quest X; Written by Yūki Nakashima; 20 issues |

== Music and soundtracks ==
Music and soundtracks
| Title | Release date | Label | Ref. |
|---|---|---|---|
| Dragon Quest Suite | May 10, 1986 | Apollon | |
| Dragon Quest in Brass | July 5, 1988 | Apollon | |
| Dragon Quest on Electone | September 21, 1988 | Apollon | |
| Dragon Quest on Piano Vol. 1 | August 10, 1990 | Apollon | |
| Dragon Quest I CD Theater | July 19, 1991 | Enix | |
| Dragon Quest I Remix Symphonic Suite | January 12, 1994 | Sony Records | |
| Dragon Quest I & II Symphonic Suite | August 23, 2000 | SPE Visual Works | |
| Dragon Quest I Symphonic Suite | March 21, 2007 | Aniplex | |
| Dragon Quest II Suite | February 5, 1987 | Apollon | |
| Dragon Quest on Piano Vol. 2 | August 10, 1990 | Apollon | |
| Dragon Quest II CD Theater | December 13, 1991 | Enix | |
| Dragon Quest II ~Marriage Waltz~ | December 20, 1991 | Apollon | |
| Dragon Quest II Remix Symphonic Suite | February 21, 1994 | Sony Records | |
| Dragon Quest II Symphonic Suite | April 20, 2005 | Aniplex | |
| Dragon Quest III Symphonic Suite (NHK Symphony Orchestra) | March 7, 1988 | Apollon | |
| Dragon Quest III Naoshi Kougami Vocal | June 21, 1988 | Apollon | |
| March Dragon Quest III | July 5, 1988 | Apollon | |
| Dragon Quest III CD Theater | March 20, 1993 | Enix | |
| Dragon Quest III Remix Symphonic Suite | December 12, 1996 | Sony Records | |
| Dragon Quest III And Into the Legend | April 21, 1997 | Sony Records | |
| Dragon Quest III Symphonic Suite (London Philharmonic Orchestra) | August 23, 2000 | SPE Visual Works | |
| Symphonic Suite Dragon Quest III Symphonic Suite & Game Boy Color Original Soundtrack | March 7, 2001 | SPE Visual Works | |
| Dragon Quest III Symphonic Suite (Tokyo Metropolitan Symphony Orchestra) | April 20, 2005 | SPE Visual Works | |
| Dragon Quest IV Symphonic Suite (NHK Symphony Orchestra) | March 13, 1990 | Apollon | |
| Dragon Quest IV in Brass | October 21, 1990 | Apollon | |
| March Dragon Quest IV | October 21, 1990 | Apollon | |
| Dragon Quest IV on Electone | December 16, 1990 | Apollon | |
| Dragon Quest IV CD Theater Vol. 1 | January 1, 1994 | Enix | |
| Dragon Quest IV CD Theater Vol. 2 | January 28, 1994 | Enix | |
| Dragon Quest IV CD Theater Vol. 3 | March 11, 1994 | Enix | |
| Dragon Quest IV Symphonic Suite (London Philharmonic Orchestra) | February 6, 1991 | Apollon | |
| Dragon Quest IV Symphonic Suite (London Philharmonic Orchestra Remastered) | August 28, 2000 | SPE Visual Works | |
| Dragon Quest IV Symphonic Suite & PlayStation Original Soundtrack | December 19, 2001 | SPE Visual Works | |
| Dragon Quest IV Concert Live in 2002 | December 18, 2002 | SPE Visual Works | |
| Dragon Quest IV Symphonic Suite (Tokyo Metropolitan Symphony Orchestra) | May 18, 2005 | SPE Visual Works | |
| Dragon Quest V ~ Strongest Book of Guidance | August 12, 1992 | Apollon | |
| Dragon Quest V Symphonic Suite (NHK Symphony Orchestra) | October 21, 1992 | Apollon | |
| Dragon Quest V in Brass | March 5, 1993 | Apollon | |
| Dragon Quest V on Piano | August 10, 1990 | Apollon | |
| Dragon Quest V on Electone | June 21, 1993 | Apollon | |
| Dragon Quest V CD Theater Vol. 1 | October 19, 1994 | Enix | |
| Dragon Quest V CD Theater Vol. 2 | November 22, 1994 | Enix | |
| Dragon Quest V CD Theater Vol. 3 | January 6, 1996 | Enix | |
| Dragon Quest V Symphonic Suite (London Philharmonic Orchestra) | August 23, 2000 | SPE Visual Works | |
| Dragon Quest V Symphonic Suite (Tokyo Metropolitan Symphony Orchestra) | June 23, 2004 | Aniplex | |
| Dragon Quest VI Symphonic Suite (London Philharmonic Orchestra) | December 21, 1995 | Sony Records | |
| Dragon Quest VI on Piano | February 21, 1996 | Sony Records | |
| Dragon Quest VI on Electone | April 21, 1996 | Sony Records | |
| Dragon Quest VI in Brass | June 1, 1996 | Sony Records | |
| Dragon Quest VI CD Theater Vol. 1 | October 20, 1996 | Enix | |
| Dragon Quest VI CD Theater Vol. 2 | November 18, 1996 | Enix | |
| Dragon Quest VI Symphonic Suite (London Philharmonic Orchestra Remastered) | August 23, 2000 | SPE Visual Works | |
| Dragon Quest VI Symphonic Suite (Tokyo Metropolitan Symphony Orchestra) | July 19, 2006 | Aniplex | |
| Dragon Quest VII Symphonic Suite & Original Soundtrack | September 6, 2000 | SME Visual Works | |
| Dragon Quest VII Symphonic Suite SACD | November 1, 2000 | SME Visual Works | |
| Dragon Quest VII on Piano | February 21, 1996 | SME Visual Works | |
| Dragon Quest VII Symphonic Suite (Tokyo Metropolitan Symphony Orchestra) | October 20, 2006 | Aniplex | |
| Dragon Quest VIII Original Soundtrack | December 22, 2004 | Aniplex | |
| Dragon Quest VIII Symphonic Suite | June 22, 2005 | Aniplex | |
| Dragon Quest IX Original Soundtrack & Synthesizer Suite | August 5, 2009 | King Records | |
| Dragon Quest IX Symphonic Suite | February 10, 2010 | King Records | |
| Dragon Quest X Symphonic Suite | December 5, 2012 | King Records | |
| Dragon Quest Torneko's Adventure Symphonic Suite | October 21, 1993 | Sony Records | |
| Dragon Quest Torneko's Adventure CD Theater | July 29, 1994 | Enix | |
| Dragon Quest Torneko's Adventure 2 Symphonic Suite | January 21, 2000 | SPE Visual Works | |
| Dragon Quest Monsters Synthesizer Suite & Original Soundtrack | October 31, 1998 | Sony Records | |
| Dragon Quest Monsters II Synthesizer Suite & Original Soundtrack | April 11, 2001 | SPE Visual Works | |
| Dragon Quest Swords Original Soundtrack | August 22, 2007 | Aniplex | |
| Dragon Quest Best Songs Selection ~ Loula | May 26, 1993 | Polystar | |
| Dragon Quest Live Best Selection | November 2, 1994 | Sony Records | |
| Dragon Quest Symphonic Suite Best Selection Vol. 1 ~Roto~ | July 21, 1997 | Sony Records | |
| Dragon Quest Symphonic Suite Best Selection Vol. 2 ~Tenku~ | September 21, 1997 | Sony Records | |
| Dragon Quest Symphonic Suite Best Selection ~ Roto / Tenku | October 22, 1997 | Sony Records | |
| Dragon Quest Symphonic Suite The Best | March 23, 2001 | SPE Visual Works | |
| Dragon Quest Symphonic Suite The Best 2 | March 22, 2002 | SPE Visual Works | |
| Dragon Quest Game Music Super Collection Vol. 1 | December 5, 2001 | SPE Visual Works | |
| Dragon Quest Game Music Super Collection Vol. 2 | January 9, 2002 | SPE Visual Works | |
| Dragon Quest Game Music Super Collection Vol. 3 | February 6, 2002 | SPE Visual Works | |
| Dragon Quest Symphonic Suite Complete CD Box | January 22, 2003 | SPE Visual Works | |
| Dragon Quest in Concert (Family Classic Concert) | October 21, 1987 | Apollon | |
| Dragon Quest in Concert (Family Classic Concert 2) | November 21, 1988 | Apollon | |
| Dragon Quest ~Jipangu World~ | June 21, 1991 | Apollon | |
| Dragon Quest Brass Suite | October 6, 1993 | Telarc International Corporation | |
| Dragon Quest Legend | November 18, 1996 | PolyGram | |
| Dragon Quest String Quartet | December 7, 2005 | Aniplex | |
| Dragon Quest Brass Quintet | February 22, 2006 | Aniplex | |
| Dragon Quest Brass Quintet II | October 24, 2007 | Aniplex | |
| Dragon Quest Brass Quintet III | February 4, 2009 | Aniplex | |
| Dragon Quest Best Dance Mix | March 4, 2009 | Avex Trax | |
| Dragon Quest Wind Ensemble | July 21, 2010 | King Records | |
| Dragon Quest Wind Ensemble II | September 22, 2010 | King Records | |
| Symphonic Suite Dragon Quest Scene-Separated I~IX | October 5, 2011 | King Records | |
