= Dragon Quest Monsters: The Dark Prince =

2023 video game

- Developer: Tose
- Publisher: Square Enix
- Director: Shotaro Ozeki
- Producer: Kento Yokota
- Designer: Mirei Hashimoto
- Programmers: Takayuki Iwakura; Masafumi Tsurumaki
- Artist: Akira Toriyama
- Writer: Jin Fujisawa
- Composer: Koichi Sugiyama
- Series: Dragon Quest Monsters
- Engine: Unity
- Platforms: Nintendo Switch; Android; iOS; Windows
- Release: Nintendo Switch; December 1, 2023; Android, iOS, Windows; September 11, 2024
- Genre: Role-playing
- Modes: Single-player, multiplayer

Dragon Quest Monsters: The Dark Prince (Note: Known in Japan as Dragon Quest Monsters 3 The Demon Prince and the Elf's Journey (Japanese: ドラゴンクエストモンスターズ３ 魔族の王子とエルフの旅, Hepburn: Doragon Kuesuto Monsutāzu 3 Mazoku no Ōji to Erufu no Tabi)) is a 2023 role-playing video game developed by Tose and published by Square Enix. It is the seventh game in the Dragon Quest Monsters series following Dragon Quest Monsters: Joker 3 and the first to be released outside of Japan since Joker 2 in 2011. The Dark Prince was released for the Nintendo Switch in December 2023 and for Android, iOS, and Windows in September 2024. The game received mixed reviews from critics and sold a million copies by January 2024. It is the last Dragon Quest game to be released during Akira Toriyama's lifetime.

The Dark Prince stars Psaro, the main antagonist from Dragon Quest IV; The Dark Prince is set before the events of Dragon Quest IV. Psaro is on a quest to defeat his father who cursed him, by becoming a 'monster wrangler'. Gameplay consists of turn-based menu selection combat and 3D overworld exploration. Like previous installments in the Dragon Quest Monsters series, the player must obtain monsters, either through an impressive show of force, enticing them with meat, or hatching them from eggs, and then combine obtained monsters through "synthesis" in order to create a team powerful enough to overcome tougher foes.

== Gameplay ==
Dragon Quest Monsters: The Dark Prince is a turn-based role-playing game that has the protagonist, Psaro, taming monsters and using them to battle in his place. Monsters can grow stronger in battle, experiencing changes to their attributes as they grow. While exploring the environment, the seasons will cycle, which causes environmental changes and changes to the monsters available in different areas.

== Plot ==
The story follows the journey of Psaro, a half-human, half-monster prince. Psaro challenged his father, the cruel monster king and ruler of Nadiria, Randolfo the Tyrant. As punishment for his defiance, Randolfo curses Psaro, making him unable to cause harm to any monster, before exiling him to Terrestria. Bent on revenge, Psaro vows to lift the curse, return to Nadiria, and usurp Randolfo. Taking refuge in the human village Rosehill, Psaro finds a loophole to his inability to harm monsters in the art of monster wrangling. By becoming a monster master, he can have his allies defeat monsters for him, circumventing his curse. A retired monster master and villager named Monty gifts the prince his first monster, and teaches him the basics of monster wrangling. Psaro soon meets and befriends a fugitive elf, whom he names Rose, as she lacks a name. She accompanies Psaro and allows him entry to Nadiria with her unique elfin magic.

The game's plot serves as both prequel and side-story to the events of Dragon Quest IV, with the storylines of the two games overlapping at points.

== Development ==
Dragon Quest Monsters: The Dark Prince was developed by Tose and published by Square Enix. After the Joker series of Dragon Quest Monsters games concluded with Dragon Quest Monsters: Joker 3, they thought about what they could do as a story in this game, which ultimately lead to having Psaro serve as the game's protagonist. Producer Kento Yokota noted how uncommon it was for an antagonist to be given the role of a protagonist and how interesting it could be, which series creator Yuji Horii agreed. Yokota described two types of Dragon Quest Monsters games, split between the Game Boy games and the Nintendo DS/3DS games, intending for this game to be a fusion of both types.

== Reception ==
Reception

Aggregate scores
Aggregator	Score
Metacritic	72/100
OpenCritic	51% recommend (Note: Based on 47 reviews)

Review score
Publication	Score
Famitsu	36/40

According to the review aggregation website Metacritic, Dragon Quest Monsters: The Dark Prince received "mixed or average" reviews from critics.

During its first week on the market in Japan, the game sold 346,583 physical copies according to Famitsu, becoming the best selling game in Japan for that week. The game had sold a million copies by January 2024.
