= Dragon Quest Monsters =

Spin-off series of the Dragon Quest video games

- Genre: Role-playing
- Developer: Tose
- Publisher: Square Enix (formerly Enix)
- Creator: Yuji Horii
- Artist: Akira Toriyama
- Composer: Koichi Sugiyama
- Platforms: Game Boy Color, Game Boy Advance, Nintendo DS, PlayStation, Nintendo 3DS, Nintendo Switch, Android, iOS, Windows
- First release: Dragon Warrior Monsters; September 25, 1998
- Latest release: Dragon Quest Monsters: The Dark Prince; December 1, 2023
- Parent series: Dragon Quest

Dragon Quest Monsters (Note: Known in Japanese as ドラゴンクエストモンスターズ (Doragon Kuesuto Monsutāzu), and Dragon Warrior Monsters in North America) is a spin-off series of the Dragon Quest games. Primarily developed by Tose and published by Square Enix (formerly Enix), it sets the player in a medieval/fantasy world filled with magic, monsters, and knights. Unlike the original Dragon Quest games, the player's character does not do any of the fighting in battles; the player must instead rely on capturing, breeding, and raising monsters to do the fighting for them. The concept originated from Dragon Quest V (1992). The character and monster designs are by Dragon Ball creator Akira Toriyama. The series spans several handheld gaming systems, and each game has received positive reviews from critics. The series' gameplay has been compared to Pokémon.

For the first two US releases, the titles used Warrior instead of the original Japanese Quest. This was due to a US trademark conflict with the role-playing game DragonQuest, which was published by Simulation Publications in the 1980s until the company's bankruptcy in 1982 and purchase by TSR, Inc., which then published it as an alternate line to Dungeons & Dragons until 1987. In 2003, Square Enix registered the Dragon Quest trademark in the US, making the Dragon Warrior name obsolete.

== Games ==
Release timeline
1998	Dragon Warrior Monsters
1999
2000
2001	Dragon Warrior Monsters 2
2002	Dragon Quest Monsters 1+2
2003	Caravan Heart
2004
2005
2006	Joker
2007
2008
2009
2010	Joker 2
2010	Wanted!
2011
2012	Terry's Wonderland 3D
2013
2014	Iru and Luca's Marvelous Mysterious Key
2014	Super Light
2015
2016	Joker 3
2017
2018	Terry's Wonderland SP
2019	Terry's Wonderland Retro
2020
2021
2022
2023	The Dark Prince
2024
2025
2026	The Withered World

Dragon Warrior Monsters, the first game in the series, was released for the Game Boy Color in 1998 and in North America and Europe in 2000. The Japanese version was titled Dragon Quest Monsters. It was released with Game Boy Color compatibility despite coming to market before the console itself, but the cartridge was backward-compatible with the original Game Boy as well. Its sequel, Dragon Warrior Monsters 2, was also a cross-system Game Boy Color title. It released in Japan and North America in 2001. There are two versions of Dragon Warrior Monsters 2: Cobi's Journey and Tara's Adventure, titled after the playable character of each version. In Japan, these were named Ruka’s Journey and Iru's Adventure, respectively. Each version features slight differences, such as monster appearances. Both Dragon Warrior Monsters and Dragon Warrior Monsters 2 were developed by Tose and published by Enix. Dragon Quest Monsters 1+2, a remake of these two games with updated graphics and interface, was released in 2002 in Japan for the PlayStation. The game is compatible with the i-Mode adapter for the PlayStation, allowing players to upload monsters to the i-Mode cellular phone version, Dragon Quest Monsters i. The two games were remade on the Japanese Nintendo 3DS in 2012 (as Terry's Wonderland 3D) and 2014 (as Iru and Luca's Marvelous Mysterious Key), respectively. The first remade game was ported to smartphones in 2018 for the Japanese market as Terry's Wonderland SP. Finally, the first game was ported to the Nintendo Switch and smartphones in 2019 for the Japanese market as Terry's Wonderland Retro.

Dragon Quest Monsters: Caravan Heart is the third game in the series, released in Japan in 2003 for the Game Boy Advance. Developed by Tose, the game was the last Dragon Quest game Enix published before merging with Square. It features Kiefer, a prince from Dragon Warrior VII.

Dragon Quest Monsters: Joker, for the Nintendo DS, was released in Japan in 2006 and was the first in the series to feature 3D graphics. It was brought to North America the next year, and was released in Europe (as well as Australia) in 2008, making it the second game in the series to do so. Initially revealed through the publication Shonen Jump, the game is set around a tournament referred to as the Joker GP. It also features Wi-Fi multiplayer play through the Nintendo Wi-Fi Connection service and full 3D movement and battles. Unlike the other games in the series, this game has no random battles. Dragon Quest Monsters: Joker 2 was released in Japan on April 28, 2010, and in the United States on September 19, 2011, as revealed at E3 2011. Dragon Quest Monsters: Joker 3 was only released in Japan on March 24, 2016.

Two cell phone games, Dragon Quest Monsters: Wanted! and Dragon Quest Monsters: Super Light, were released in Japan.

On December 1, 2023, Dragon Quest Monsters: The Dark Prince was released for the Nintendo Switch. Tose returned to develop the game. On May 27, 2026, Dragon Quest Monsters: The Withered World was announced to celebrate the 40th anniversary of the Dragon Quest, featuring Nera and Bianca from Dragon Quest V, with releases for Nintendo Switch, Nintendo Switch 2, PlayStation 5, Xbox Series X/S and Microsoft Windows, a first for the series.

== Gameplay ==
Although each of the games have distinct differences, they all have similar gameplay to the main Dragon Quest series. Players control the main character, but, unlike in Dragon Quest, the main character does not fight. Caught or bred monsters participate in battles instead of humans, although this changes slightly in Caravan Heart. Battles for the first three games are fought in first-person and are turn-based. Monsters are able to gain experience points just like humans in the main series would and can learn spells and skills straight from the Dragon Quest games.

=== Battle system ===
Battle from Caravan Heart

Up until Joker, battles were fought against randomly encountered monsters in a first-person view. Joker changed this by allowing players to see enemies on the field as well as making battles three-dimensional. The player controls up to three monsters at once, and their HP and MP are displayed onscreen. The player can then choose from several options on what to do. As of Joker 2, there are certain monsters who do take up two or three spaces on party, to fit their size. As of Terry's Wonderland 3D for Nintendo 3DS, there are four spaces in the party instead of three, allowing the player to control more monsters at a time.

Typically, the player does not directly control the monsters and instead gives them suggestions. Charge tells monsters to use their most direct and powerful attacks. Mixed suggests to monsters to use support abilities, such as shields, stat enhancements, or summons and Cautious tells monsters to use defensive abilities, such as healing and reviving spells and abilities that remove harmful stat effects. During battle, the player can select Plan, which allows the player to change any of the commands. Command gives the player direct control of the party and cannot be used in arena battles. Fight simply makes monsters follow their set commands. The player can also use items during battle, many which are from the Dragon Quest games. The party can also attempt to flee random battles.

==== Personalities ====
A message may appear that says "will attempt" for some of the commands; this is because each monster is given a certain personality depending on the player's actions used in combat. Those actions are Charge, Mixed and Cautious, which when used can raise/lower one of three hidden stats, Bravery, Prudence and Caring.

Basically this means a monster high in one of the three stats will be better at using an attack of that type and more likely to obey, for example a monster with the Personality type Reckless (which is high in Bravery but low in Prudence and Caring) will be more likely to use a Charge attack, whereas a monster with the Personality type Careful (a type high in Caring but low in Bravery and Prudence) will be more likely to use a Cautious attack. Personalities change quicker at lower levels than at higher levels, and monsters with a high wildness stat have harder-to-change personalities. A monster can have one of 27 personalities.

==== Wildness ====
Another reason monsters might not obey commands is their wildness (WLD in the game). A monster with a high wildness is less likely to obey commands. Newly caught monsters and monsters kept in the farm for long periods of time will have high wildness. To lower a monster's wildness, the player needs to keep it in the party for a while or feed it meat items.

=== Obtaining monsters ===
Exploration in Caravan Heart

As with other role-playing video games, when the player's party defeats the opposing monsters and the battle ends, the party is awarded a certain amount of experience points (EXP) which are used to level up monsters. At the end of the battle, there exists a small chance the opposing monster may join the party. The chance of a monster joining the party is increased by the use of meat items which lowers a monster's wildness. The more the player uses, the lower the monster's wildness will be and the more likely it is to join. Certain types of meat lower a monster's wildness more, thus increasing the chance of catching them. This is true in the first three games.

In Dragon Quest Monsters: Joker, the player can actively scout for monsters during battle. Unlike previous games in the series, this is a battle command, and not the result of using items in battle. The player can make any number of scouting attempts during a battle, until the monster decides to join, or takes offense. Success depends on the relative strengths of the monsters making the attempt versus the relative defense of the monster that is being scouted.

=== Breeding ===
Breeding monsters has been a large part of the series and is often cited as one of the series' highlights, in part due to being able to create monsters that cannot otherwise be obtained. In the first two games, the player was able to breed two monsters together and create a different monster, usually a combination of its two parents. The parent monsters would disappear after breeding. Caravan Heart changed the system, instead using Monster Hearts to create new monsters. Joker returned to the first system, although the name was changed to Synthesizing. Instead of breeding a male with a female monster, the player must fuse a Plus monster with an Minus monster. However, in the original Japanese version of the game, it remains as normal breeding of genders.

== Reception ==
Each of the games in the Dragon Quest Monsters series has been met with praise by critics. Each game has sold well in Japan. US releases for the first two games brought on comparisons to the Pokémon franchise, another monster-collecting RPG. However, with the release of Joker for the Nintendo DS game, these comparisons were not as much of a focus in reviews, but still existed. 1UP.com, when reviewing Joker, noted that "the Monsters series has always felt like it belongs in the Dragon Quest universe first and foremost; it's more than a bunch of bastardized Pokéclones. The latest installment of the subseries – Joker – is a perfect example."

Each of the games in the series has sold well, particularly in Japan, where the Dragon Quest series has gained immense popularity. In Japan, Dragon Warrior Monsters sold 2.35 million copies. The North American version sold 60,000 copies by April 2000.Dragon Warrior Monsters 2 has sold 1,592,728 copies in Japan. Dragon Quest Monsters 1+2 was the 38th best-selling game of 2002 with 292,275 copies. Caravan Heart was a top-seller during the time of its release, with over 538,000 units sold within three months of its release and 593,000 units sold to date. Dragon Quest Monsters: Joker sold 593,994 units in the first four days after release in Japan. To date, it has sold over 1.9 million units worldwide.
