= Yuji Horii =

Japanese video game designer and writer (born 1954)

- 堀井 雄二
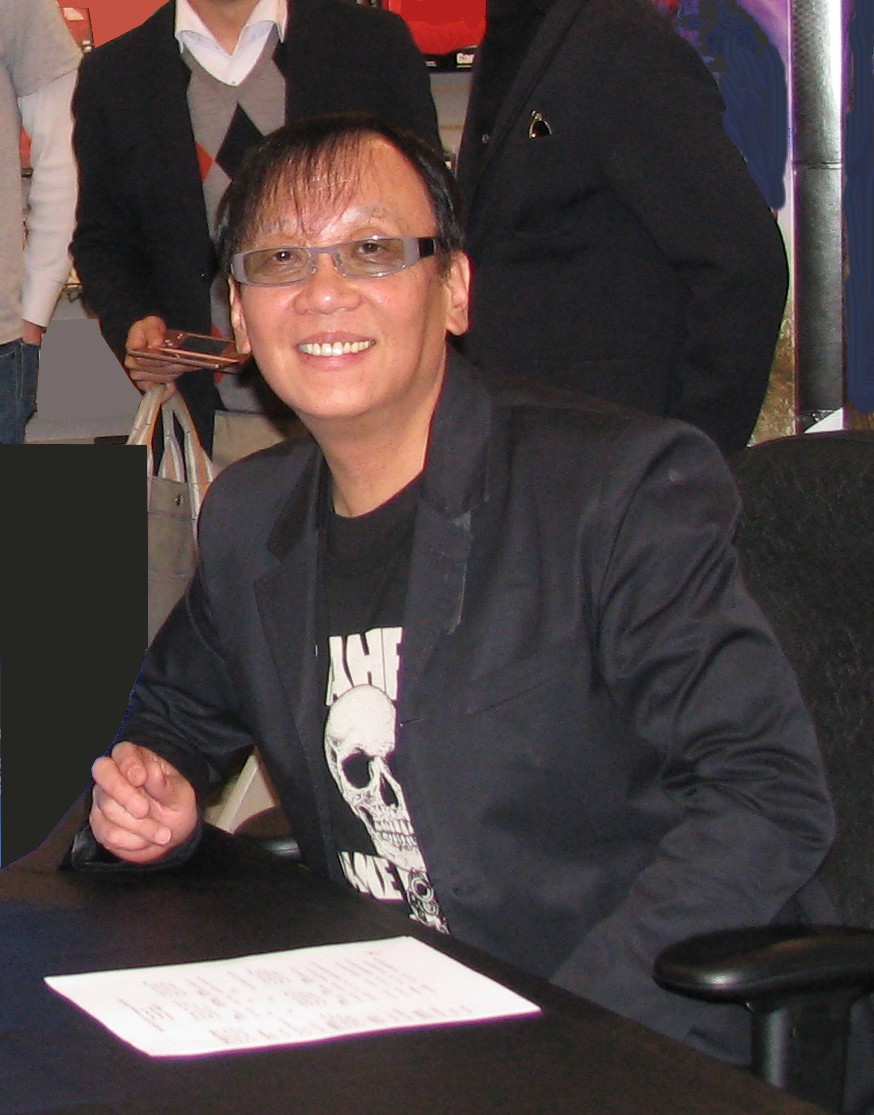
- Horii in 2011
- Born: January 6, 1954 (age 72); Sumoto, Hyōgo, Japan
- Education: Waseda University
- Occupations: Author; game designer; writer
- Years active: 1982–present
- Employer: Armor Project (1985–present)
- Known for: Dragon Quest series; The Portopia Serial Murder Case; Chrono Trigger

Yuji Horii (Japanese: 堀井 雄二, Hepburn: Horii Yūji; born January 6, 1954) is a Japanese author, video game designer, writer and director best known as the creator of the Dragon Quest franchise, supervising and writing the scenario for Chrono Trigger, and The Portopia Serial Murder Case, released in 1983 as one of the first visual novel adventure games.

Horii is CEO of his own company, Armor Project, a company that has an exclusive production contract with Square Enix, a contract established with Enix before the company merged with Square, and is also one of the companies who co-own the Dragon Quest franchise alongside Square Enix. In 2025, Horii became the first video game creator to receive the Order of the Rising Sun from the Japanese government for his contributions to the arts.

== History ==
Horii was born on January 6, 1954, in Awaji Island, Japan. He graduated from Waseda University's Department of Literature. He also worked as a freelance writer for newspapers, comics, and magazines, including the Famicom Shinken video games column that ran in Weekly Shōnen Jump from 1985 to 1988.

He then entered in an Enix-sponsored game programming contest, where he placed with Love Match Tennis, a tennis video game, motivating him to become a video game designer.

Horii then created The Portopia Serial Murder Case by himself, a game that later inspired Hideo Kojima (of Metal Gear fame) to enter the video game industry. It is the first part of the Yuji Horii Mysteries trilogy, along with its successors Hokkaido Rensa Satsujin: Ohotsuku ni Kiyu (1984) and Karuizawa Yūkai Annai (1985).

After creating several more visual novel adventure games, Horii went on to create Dragon Quest, which is said to have created the blueprint for Japanese console role-playing games, taking inspiration from Portopia, as well as Wizardry and Ultima.

He was a fan of Apple PC role-playing games and was motivated to create Dragon Quest for ordinary gamers, who found such games difficult, and thus he worked on an intuitive control system, influenced by his work on Portopia.

His works also include the Itadaki Street series. Horii was also a supervisor of the Super Nintendo Entertainment System game, Chrono Trigger, which had multiple game endings, with Horii appearing in one of the endings with the game development staff.

He is on the selection committee for the annual Super Dash Novel Rookie of the Year Award.

== Ludography ==
Year	Title	Role
1983	Love Match Tennis	Developer
1983	The Portopia Serial Murder Case	Developer
1984	Hokkaido Rensa Satsujin: Ohotsuku ni Kiyu	Game design, scenario
1985	Karuizawa Yūkai Annai	Developer
1986	Dragon Quest	Game design, scenario
1987	Dragon Quest II	Game design, scenario
1988	Dragon Quest III	Game design, scenario
1990	Dragon Quest IV	Game design, scenario
1991	Itadaki Street	Game design
1991	Famicom Jump II: Saikyō no Shichinin	Scenario supervisor
1992	Dragon Quest V	Game design, scenario
1994	Itadaki Street 2	Game design
1995	Chrono Trigger	Supervisor
1995	Dragon Quest VI	Game design, scenario
1998	Itadaki Street: Gorgeous King	Game design, scenario
1998	Dragon Quest Monsters	Executive director, game design, scenario
2000	Dragon Quest VII	Game design, scenario director
2001	Dragon Quest Monsters 2	Executive director, game design, scenario
2002	Itadaki Street 3	Original planning, supervisor
2002	Torneko's Great Adventure 3	Supervisor
2003	Dragon Quest Monsters: Caravan Heart	Executive producer
2003	Kenshin Dragon Quest	Executive producer
2003	Slime Mori Mori Dragon Quest	Executive producer
2004	Dragon Quest VIII	Game design, scenario
2004	Itadaki Street Special	Original planning, supervisor
2005	Dragon Quest Heroes: Rocket Slime	Executive producer
2006	Itadaki Street Portable	Original planning, supervisor
2006	Dragon Quest: Young Yangus and the Mystery Dungeon	General director
2006	Dragon Quest Monsters: Joker	General director, game design, scenario
2007	Itadaki Street DS	Game design
2007	Dragon Quest Swords	General director, game design, scenario
2009	Dragon Quest Wars	General director
2009	Dragon Quest IX	Game design, scenario
2010	Dragon Quest Monsters: Joker 2	General director
2011	Slime Mori Mori Dragon Quest 3	Supervisor
2011	Fortune Street	Game design
2012	Dragon Quest X	General director, game design, scenario
2015	Dragon Quest Heroes	General director
2015	Dragon Quest of the Stars	General director
2015	Theatrhythm Dragon Quest	General director
2016	Dragon Quest Builders	General director
2016	Dragon Quest Monsters: Joker 3	General director
2016	Dragon Quest Heroes II	General director
2017	Dragon Quest XI	Game design, scenario
2017	Itadaki Street: Dragon Quest and Final Fantasy 30th Anniversary	Original planning, supervisor
2017	Dragon Quest Rivals	General director
2018	Dragon Quest Builders 2	General director
2019	Dragon Quest Walk	General director
2022	Dragon Quest Treasures	General director, voice of Yuji the King Slime
2023	Infinity Strash: Dragon Quest The Adventure of Dai	General director
2023	Dragon Quest Monsters: The Dark Prince	General director
2024	Dragon Quest III HD-2D Remake	Game design, scenario
2025	Dragon Quest I & II HD-2D Remake	Game design, scenario
2026	Dragon Quest VII Reimagined	Game design, scenario director
2026	Tensei Game: Karma x Cross	Supervisor
2027	Next: The Portopia Serial Murder Case	Executive director, original story
2027	Dragon Quest RPG: The Cursed Tree and the Chosen Isle	General director
TBA	Dragon Quest XII	Game design, scenario

== Recognition ==
Horii received an award at the 2009 Computer Entertainment Supplier's Association developers conference and a lifetime achievement award at the 2022 Game Developers Conference for his work on Dragon Quest and Chrono Trigger.

== Honors ==
- Order of the Rising Sun, 4th Class, Gold Rays with Rosette (2025)
