= Dragon Quest Walk =

2019 video game

- Developer: COLOPL
- Publisher: Square Enix
- Director: Yuji Horii
- Producer: Takamasa Shiba
- Artist: Akira Toriyama
- Composer: Koichi Sugiyama
- Series: Dragon Quest
- Platforms: Android, iOS
- Release: JP: 12 September 2019
- Genres: Geolocation-based game, role-playing game

Dragon Quest Walk (DQW) is a geolocation-based role-playing video game developed by COLOPL and published by Square Enix for Android and iOS. It is a free-to-play entry in the Dragon Quest series and was released in Japan on 12 September 2019.

== Gameplay ==
The gameplay of Dragon Quest Walk is centered around interaction with various real-world locations in-game, with various monsters and characters from the Dragon Quest series being in the game. Players could battle monsters in order to improve their character and obtain items, or in order to advance quests. The quests system in the game require players to walk towards certain destinations in real life, which would unlock enemies or interactions with in-game characters. Various locations in the game would also restore the player character's hit points. The battles with monsters involve the player character, or their party with other players, engaging with one or more monsters. Once the battle is completed, players may receive items which could be equipped on their characters in order to improve their skills. As with other games in the JRPG genre or in the Dragon Quest series, players may opt to automatically resolve the battle without additional input. Occasionally, more powerful monsters may appear in the in-game map, which could be fought by up to 12 players simultaneously.

Within the game, players could also establish "home" locations wherever they would like. These homes could be customized with various decorations, similar to the MMO Dragon Quest X.

== Development ==
Walk was developed by Japanese mobile studio COLOPL, with planning and production being done by Square Enix. Its development was first announced in June 2019, and a beta registration was opened to enroll 20,000 beta testers (10,000 for Android and iOS each). Walk had Yuji Horii as General director, Akira Toriyama as character and monster designer and Koichi Sugiyama as composer. Dragon Quest Walk was released on 12 September 2019 in Japan for Android and iOS.

== Reception ==
Within the first week of its release, the game had been downloaded over five million times. Analytics company Sensor Tower estimated that the game received US$86 million in revenue during its first month, while throughout 2019, Walk generated US$201 million in revenue, making it the second-highest grossing location-based mobile game after Pokémon Go and ahead of the China-exclusive Let's Hunt Monsters in third place. In January 2020, a partnership with Suntory was established, where 14,000 of their vending machines across Japan would act as in-game locations to restore health and receive special missions.
