= Dragon Quest Wars =

2009 video game

- Developers: Intelligent Systems; Tose
- Publisher: Square Enix
- Director: Daisuke Nakajima
- Producers: Toru Narihiro; Taichi Inuzuka
- Designer: Yuya Ishii
- Programmer: Yuya Ishii
- Artist: Akira Toriyama
- Composer: Koichi Sugiyama
- Series: Dragon Quest
- Platform: Nintendo DSi
- Release: JP: June 24, 2009; NA: September 28, 2009; PAL: October 9, 2009
- Genre: Turn-based tactics
- Modes: Single-player, multiplayer

Dragon Quest Wars (Note: Japanese: ドラゴンクエスト ウォーズ, Hepburn: Doragon Kuesuto Wōzu) is a 2009 turn-based strategy video game developed by Intelligent Systems and published by Square Enix for the Nintendo DSi via its DSiWare download service. It is part of the Dragon Quest series and supports up to three other players in multiplayer.

== Gameplay ==
Screenshot showing the general interface and gameplay of Dragon Quest Wars

Dragon Quest Wars allows up to four players to battle one another with four monster units each on a four-sided battlefield made up a squares. Battles during the game are limited to five to ten turns. Players move units by touching and dragging them using the DS stylus. Commands are issued to units also by touching and dragging them onto a unit from the bottom of the screen. These commands are color-coded and include red (physical attacks), green (recovery), blue (defence), and yellow (magic). Each monster unit has between one and three hearts. These hearts deplete as monsters are attacked, and when they reach 0, the monster walks off the field. A player can win a battle either when all enemy units are defeated or if one of their units crosses into an enemy's base. Dragon Quest Wars also features "survival matches", which require the player to set all of their moves within a time limit before the battle begins. The game has six playable units: Slimes, Hammerhood, Dracky, Golem, Chimera, and Healslime. All are recurring monsters in the Dragon Quest series.

== Development ==
Dragon Quest Wars was developed by Intelligent Systems as part of a collaboration between Nintendo and Square Enix for Intelligent Systems to design six video games for Square Enix on the DSiWare service. As with most other games in the Dragon Quest franchise, development on Dragon Quest Wars was supervised by Yūji Horii, while Akira Toriyama and Koichi Sugiyama fulfilled their respective duties as character designer and composer. Producer Taichi Inuzuka states that has long been his hope to create simulation game (strategy game) with Dragon Quest. The developers wanted to design a game to "convey the fun of simulation games and to provide a gateway to users who’ve never played simulation games." Intelligent Systems previously developed the Wars and Fire Emblem series for Nintendo.

== Reception ==
Reception

Aggregate score
Aggregator	Score
Metacritic	83/100

Review scores
Publication	Score
IGN	8/10
Nintendo Life	8/10

Dragon Quest Wars received "generally favorable" reviews, according to review aggregator platform Metacritic.

1UP.com editor Justin Epperson described Dragon Quest Wars as a board game, going so far as to say he wishes it were a board game so it would be more entertaining. He added however that it was definitely worth the price. Wiiloveit.com offered a high recommendation with a 24/30, praising the "surprising amount of strategy", as well as the "robust" online mode which "[brought] the title to life". Dragon Quest Wars was nominated for Game of the Year by Nintendo Power, as well as DSiWare Game of the Year.
