= Dragon Quest: Young Yangus and the Mystery Dungeon =

2006 video game

- Developer: Cavia
- Publisher: Square Enix
- Director: Yoshimasa Asao
- Producers: Takamasa Shiba; Takuya Iwasaki
- Designer: Yuji Horii
- Artist: Akira Toriyama
- Writer: Fuminori Ishikawa
- Composer: Koichi Sugiyama
- Series: Mystery Dungeon; Dragon Quest
- Platform: PlayStation 2
- Release: JP: April 20, 2006
- Genres: Action role-playing, Roguelike
- Mode: Single-player

Dragon Quest: Young Yangus and the Mystery Dungeon (Note: Japanese: ドラゴンクェスト 少年ヤンガスと不思議のダンジョン, Hepburn: Dragon Quest: Shōnen Yangus to Fushigi no Dungeon) is 2006 action role-playing game developed by Cavia and published by Square Enix as part of the Mystery Dungeon and Dragon Quest series. The game is a prequel to Dragon Quest VIII.

== Gameplay ==
Young Yangus and the Mystery Dungeon utilizes randomly generated dungeons and combat taken in turns. Players must fight through different floors of enemies until they reach a boss monster, which they must defeat to advance through the story. Combat takes place on contact with enemies, with no separate battle screen or menu system. A new feature to the series is the "tension command", that allows players to build up attack power to deliver strong blows upon enemies, though the character cannot move in this state. Later on in the game, and players can capture monsters with a special jug, and use them to attack opponents. Players may keep three monsters in their possession at any one time, and can be taught to use special abilities by using items and through combat experience. Monsters must reach level four, be given foods they like, and also a weapon before they will assist Yangus, and as they fight more and more, they will combine their strengths with other captured monsters. Players can also utilize a farmhouse late game where monsters can be kept and bred to create new and more powerful monsters. The game also uses cinematic and computer generated scenes with a comic-book style.

== Story ==
The game centers around the character Yangus, one of the main characters in Dragon Quest VIII, as a child. Described as a "plump bandit", he becomes involved with his father Yampa's gang of thieves when a mysterious jug is brought home. Though instructed not to touch the jug, Yangus does, and is sucked inside the bottle into another world called "Bottle Land". Red, a female bandit from Dragon Quest VIII also appears in this new world, as well as Morrie, Torneko, and a new character named Poppy, and each begins to explore the dungeons of this new land.

== Development ==
A trailer for the game was shown in December 2005. The game's soundtrack features music by Koichi Sugiyama from Dragon Quest VIII arranged by Hayato Matsuo.

== Reception ==
The game ranked third in Japan for game sales for the week of April 17 to April 23, 2006. The title sold over 340,000 copies in Japan by November 2006, according to Square Enix's IR, and ranking number 42 in sales overall for the year. The game was noted for its "cartoonish 3D graphics", and its full motion video was also praised. The original art style and cell-shaded graphics were highlighted for praise as well. IGN described the dungeon movement system in the game as "clumsy". The narration of the game was thought to be hilarious, due to the narrator's acting out of various characters parts. The protagonist of the game, Young Yangus, would later appear in other games in the Dragon Quest franchise such as Fortune Street in 2011 and Dragon Quest Rivals as part of an event in 2019.
