= Dragon Quest: The Adventure of Dai (1991 TV series) =

- Series 1991
- Native name
- Kanji: DRAGON QUEST -ダイの大冒険-
- Revised Hepburn: Doragon Kuesuto: Dai no Daibōken
- No. of episodes: 46

Release
- Original network: TBS
- Original release: October 17, 1991 – September 24, 1992

Series chronology
- ← Previous; N/A Next → Dragon Quest: The Adventure of Dai

Dragon Quest: The Adventure of Dai was adapted into a forty-six episode anime series by Toei Animation and aired on TBS from October 17, 1991, to September 24, 1992. Despite no official Japanese DVD release, the show reran in 2007 on Toei's channel with a new master. The series uses two pieces of theme music, both composed by Koichi Sugiyama and performed by Jiro Dan. "Hurry, Heroes!!" (勇者よ急げ!!, Yūsha yo Isoge!!) is used for the opening theme, while "My Road, My Journey" (この道わが旅, Kono Michi Waga Tabi), which was the original ending theme for Dragon Quest II, is used for the episodes' ending theme. The series adapts the events of the first 10 volumes of the manga, with initial plans to continue onward until scheduling and time slot changes at TBS lead to the series ending after 46 episodes. To accommodate the abrupt ending, Sanjo helped to provide an adjusted finale to the anime.

On January 6, 2020, the whole series was released in Japan for distribution on several video on demand (VOD) services, the first time the series has become officially available after the VHS release of the 1990s. In March 2020 it was announced that the 1991 anime will be getting a Blu-ray Box for the first time, released on July 3, 2020. The set contained all 46 episodes, and the 3 Jump Festa short anime films, (including the first film never before released on home video) which have been scanned from their original 35 mm negatives with high resolution and recorded as high-quality full HD remastered images.

== Episode list ==
No.	Title	Original release date
1	"I'm the Tiny Hero, Dai!!"; Transliteration: "Ore wa Chiisana Yūsha Dai!!" (Japanese: オレは小さな勇者ダイ‼)	October 17, 1991
2	"I Won't Let you Die, Princess Leona"; Transliteration: "Shinasete Tamaru ka Reona Hime" (Japanese: 死なせてたまるかレオナ姫)	October 24, 1991
3	"Feel Anger, Dai! Shine, Dragon Crest!!"; Transliteration: "Ikare Dai! Kagayake Doragon no Monshō!!" (Japanese: 怒れダイ!輝け竜の紋章!!)	October 31, 1991
4	"The Hero's Tutor, Avan Appears"; Transliteration: "Yūsha no Katei Kyōshi Aban Tōjō" (Japanese: 勇者の家庭教師 アバン登場)	November 7, 1991
5	"Avan Style Extreme Hero Training!!"; Transliteration: "Aban-ryū Yūsha no Chō-tokkun!!" (Japanese: アバン流·勇者の超特訓‼)	November 14, 1991
6	"The Dark Lord Hadlar, Appears! Land the Special Move, Wave Slash!!"; Transliteration: "Maō Hadorā Shutsugen! Kimero Hissatsu Waza Kaihazan!!" (Japanese: 魔王ハドラー出現!キメろ必殺技海波斬‼)	November 21, 1991
7	"The Temporary License is My Proof of Graduating; Decisive Battle!! Hadlar VS Avan"; Transliteration: "Sotsugyō no Akashi wa Karimen, Kessen!! Hadorā Tai Aban" (Japanese: 卒業の証は仮免、決戦‼ ハドラー対アバン)	November 28, 1991
8	"Avan Falls to Kamikazee!? Strike, Strash!!"; Transliteration: "Aban Megante ni Chiru!? Ute, Sutrasshu!!" (Japanese: アバン自己犠牲呪文に散る!? 撃て·最高技‼)	December 5, 1991
9	"Goodbye Dermline island! Journeying on a Great Adventure!!"; Transliteration: "Saraba Derumurin-tō! Daibōken e no Tabidachi!!" (Japanese: さらばデルムリン島!大冒険への旅立ち‼)	December 12, 1991
10	"Wandering in the Monster's Forest! The King of Beasts, Crocodine Appears"; Transliteration: "Samayoeru Ma no Mori! Jūō Kurokodain Tōjō" (Japanese: さまよえる魔の森!獣王クロコダイン登場)	December 19, 1991
11	"The Howling Void Axe! Repel it with an Avan Sword Style Technique"; Transliteration: "Unaru Shinkū no Ono! Mukaeute Aban-ryū Tōsappō" (Japanese: うなる真空の斧!むかえ撃てアバン流刀殺法)	January 9, 1992
12	"The One We Call Our Teacher Avan, the Memories Left with the Magic Bullet Gun."; Transliteration: "Warera ga Shi Aban, Madan Gan ni Nokosareta Omoide" (Japanese: 我らが師アバン、魔弾銃に残された思い出)	January 16, 1992
13	"The Ghost Bishop Zaboera's Trap: Eh!? The Fake Hero's party" Transliteration: "Yōma Shikyō Zaboera no Wana: O! Nise Yūsha Go-ikkō-sama" (Japanese: 妖魔司教ザボエラの罠 あ!?ニセ勇者御一行様)	January 23, 1992
14	"The Hundred Beast Army's Blitz Attack!! Rescue Romos Kingdom From its Crisis!"; Transliteration: "Hyakujū Madan Sō-shingeki!! Romosu Ōkoku no Kiki o Sukue!" (Japanese: 百獣魔団総進撃‼ ロモス王国の危機を救え!)	January 30, 1992
15	"Why? Brass Attacks Dai!! The Cowardly Ghost Bishop"; Transliteration: "Naze? Dai o Osou Burasu!! Hiretsu nari Yōma Shikyō" (Japanese: なぜ?ダイを襲うブラス‼ 卑劣なり妖魔司教)	February 6, 1992
16	"Muster Your Courage, Popp! A Fragment of Courage!!"; Transliteration: "Furuiokose Poppu! Hito Kakera no Yūki o!!" (Japanese: ふるい起こせポップ!ひとかけらの勇気を‼)	February 13, 1992
17	"The Evil-crushing Spell that Brings Forth a Miracle!! Now it's Time for Friendship..."; Transliteration: "Kiseki o Yobu Haja Jumon!! Yūjō yo Ima Koko ni..." (Japanese: 奇跡を呼ぶ破邪呪文‼友情よいまここに...)	February 20, 1992
18	"A Direct Hit from the Crest of Anger!! The Roaring King of Beasts, Crocodine"; Transliteration: "Ikari no Monshō ga Chokugeki!! Hoeru Jūō Kurokodain" (Japanese: 怒りの紋章が直撃‼ ほえる獣王クロコダイン)	February 27, 1992
19	"Cross the Ocean, Dai! The 6 Commanders of the Demon Lord's Army Gather"; Transliteration: "Umi o Watare Dai! Maōgun Roku-dai Gundanchō Shūketsu" (Japanese: 海を渡れダイ!魔王軍6大軍団長集結)	March 5, 1992
20	"A Frightening Enemy Appears!? The Demonic Swordsman, Hyunckel!"; Transliteration: "Osorubeki Teki Arawaru!? Maken Senshi Hyunkeru!" (Japanese: 恐るべき敵あらわる!? 魔剣戦士ヒュンケル!)	March 12, 1992
21	"Father's Enemy is Avan!? The Ultimate Black Sword of Hatred!!"; Transliteration: "Chichi no Teki wa Aban!? Nikushimi no Kuroki Saikyō Ken!!" (Japanese: 父の敵は·アバン!? 憎しみの黒き最強剣‼)	March 19, 1992
22	"The Fighting Spirits of Darkness! The Demon Puppet Grab attacks Dai!!"; Transliteration: "Ankoku Tōki! "Tōma Kugutsushō" ga Dai o Osou!!" (Japanese: 暗黒闘気!"闘魔傀儡掌"がダイを襲う‼)	March 26, 1992
23	"Maam's Crisis! Work Together to Summon Lightning!!"; Transliteration: "Māmu no Kiki! Chikara o Awasete Inazuma o Yobe!!" (Japanese: マァムの危機!力を合わせて稲妻を呼べ‼)	April 16, 1992
24	"Rescue Maam! Infiltrate the Underground Demon Castle, The Maze of Death!!"; Transliteration: "Māmu o Sukue! Chitei Majō Sennyū, Shi no Meikyū!!" (Japanese: マァムを救え!地底魔城潜入·死の迷宮‼)	April 23, 1992
25	"Thank you for... The memories... A Father's True Voice!!"; Transliteration: "Omoide o... Arigatō... Shinjitsu no Chichi no Koe!!" (Japanese: 思い出を...ありがとう... 真実の父の声‼)	April 30, 1992
26	"Farewell Lonely Soldier Hyunckel!! Settle it with the Magic Sword"; Transliteration: "Saraba Kodoku no Senshi Hyunkeru!! Ketchaku no Mahō Ken" (Japanese: さらば孤独の戦士ヒュンケル‼ 決着の魔法剣)	May 7, 1992
27	"The Ally From the Sky!! Dai, Hurry to Leona"; Transliteration: "Sora kara Kita Mikata!! Dai yo Isoge Reona no Moto e" (Japanese: 空から来た味方‼ ダイよ急げレオナのもとへ)	May 14, 1992
28	"I'll Protect Leona!! Showdown!! The Hero versus the Commander of Ice and Fire"; Transliteration: "Reona wa Ore ga Mamoru!! Taiketsu!! Yūsha Tai Hyōen Shōgun" (Japanese: レオナはオレが守る‼ 対決‼勇者対氷炎将軍)	May 21, 1992
29	"The Ice and Fire Barrier!! Ah! Leona Becomes the Frozen Girl..."; Transliteration: "Hyōen Kekkai!! Ā! Reona ga Kōreru Bijo ni..." (Japanese: 氷炎結界!!ああ! レオナが凍れる美女に...)	May 28, 1992
30	"Avan's Close Friend!? The Great Mage Matoriv's Great Training!!"; Transliteration: "Aban no Shin'yū!? Dai-madōshi Matorifu no Dai-tokkun!!" (Japanese: アバンの親友!? 大魔導士マトリフの大特訓‼)	June 4, 1992
31	"The Rescue Mission for Leona! Landing on Valge Island"; Transliteration: "Reona Kyūshutsu Sakusen no Hajimari da! Baruji-tō Jōriku!!" (Japanese: レオナ救出作戦の始まりだ! バルジ島上陸‼)	June 11, 1992
32	"The Old Enemy Hadlar!! Popp, Stand and Face Him With Courage!!"; Transliteration: "Shukuteki Hadorā!! Poppu yo Yūki de Tachimukae!!" (Japanese: 宿敵ハドラー‼ポップよ勇気で立ち向かえ‼)	June 18, 1992
33	"The Soldier Has Returned!! Clash! Hyunckel vs. Hadlar"; Transliteration: "Senshi wa Fukkatsu Shita!! Gekitotsu Hyunkeru Tai Hadorā" (Japanese: 戦士は復活した‼激突ヒュンケル対ハドラー)	June 25, 1992
34	"The Radiance of Life! The Final Fighting Spirit, Grand Cross / Pearly Gates!!"; Transliteration: "Inochi no Kagayaki! Saishū Tōki Gurando Kurusu!!" (Japanese: いのちの輝き! 最終闘気·グランドクルス‼)	July 2, 1992
35	"Flazzard's Tenacity Towards Victory! The Stormy Scattering Rock Bullet"; Transliteration: "Fureizādo Shōri e no Shūnen! Arashi no Dangan Bakkazan" (Japanese: フレイザード勝利への執念! 嵐の弾岩爆花散)	July 9, 1992
36	"Here it is! The Avan Style Final Secret Technique, Sky Slash!!"; Transliteration: "Deta! Aban-ryū Saigo no Ōgi Kūretsuzan!!" (Japanese: でたっ! アバン流最後の奥義·空裂斬‼)	July 16, 1992
37	"Avan Strash!! Now... Slice everything..." Transliteration: "Aban Sutorasshu!! Ima... Subete o Kiru..." (Japanese: アバンストラッシュ‼ いま...すべてを斬る...)	July 23, 1992
38	"The path of the disciples of Avan.. And Maam's decision" Transliteration: "Aban no Shito no Michi... Soshite Māmu no Ketsui" (Japanese: アバンの使徒の道...そしてマァムの決意)	July 30, 1992
39	"The wonderful comrade Maam, until we meet again..." Transliteration: "Subarashiki Nakama Māmu yo, Mata Au Hi made..." (Japanese: すばらしき仲間マァムよ、また会う日まで...)	August 6, 1992
40	"Shopping at Bengarna!! Lets go to the Department store." Transliteration: "Bengāna e Kaimono da!! Depāto e Ikō!" (Japanese: ベンガーナへ買い物だ‼ デパートへ行こう!)	August 13, 1992
41	"The super dragon army lands! Protect the town of Bengarna!!"; Transliteration: "Chōryū Gundan Jōriku! Bengāna no Machi o Mamore!!" (Japanese: 超竜軍団上陸!ベンガーナの街を守れ‼)	August 20, 1992
42	"The Mystic Kingdom of Teran... The sleeping legend of the Dragon Knight!"; Transliteration: "Shinpi no Kuni Teran Ōkoku... Densetsu ni Nemuru Ryū no Kishi!" (Japanese: 神秘の国テラン王国... 伝説に眠る竜の騎士!)	August 27, 1992
43	"The Dragon Commander Baran tells... The Dragon Knight's mission!" Transliteration: "Ryūkishō Baran wa Kataru... Ryū no Kishi no Shimei!" (Japanese: 竜騎将バランは語る...竜の騎士の使命!)	September 3, 1992
44	"The bond between parent and child is a sad fate! The fight between father and child!!" Transliteration: "Oyako no Kizuna wa Kanashiki Sadame! Chichi to Ko no Tatakai!!" (Japanese: 親子の絆は悲しき運命! 父と子の闘い‼)	September 10, 1992
45	"The strongest secret is the Dragon Fighting Spirit!? Protect our Dai!"; Transliteration: "Saikyō no Himitsu wa Ryū Tōki!? Oretachi no Dai o Mamore!" (Japanese: 最強の秘密は竜闘気!? オレ達のダイを守れ!)	September 17, 1992
46	"Stand up, Dai! The hero's path never ends!" Transliteration: "Dai yo Tachiagare! Yūsha no Michi wa Eien ni!" (Japanese: ダイよ立ち上がれ!勇者のみちは永遠に!)	September 24, 1992

== See also ==
- Dragon Quest: The Adventure of Dai (2020 TV series)
