= Dragon Warrior Monsters 2 =

2001 video game

- North American box art for the Tara's Adventure version
- Developer: Tose
- Publisher: Enix (Note: Nintendo 3DS version published by Square Enix.)
- Producer: Taichi Inuzuka
- Designers: Yuji Horii; Fuminori Ishikawa
- Programmers: Kouji Umeda; Ganjyuroh Igarashi
- Artist: Akira Toriyama
- Writers: Yuji Horii; Fuminori Ishikawa
- Composer: Koichi Sugiyama
- Series: Dragon Quest Monsters
- Platforms: Game Boy Color, PlayStation, Nintendo 3DS, iOS, Android
- Release: Game Boy Color: JP: March 9, 2001; NA: September 25, 2001; PlayStation: JP: May 30, 2002; 3DS: JP: February 6, 2014; iOS, Android: JP: August 6, 2020
- Genre: Role-playing
- Mode: Single-player

Dragon Warrior Monsters 2, known in Japan as Dragon Quest Monsters 2 (ドラゴンクエストモンスターズ, Doragon Kuesuto Monsutāzu Tsū), is a role-playing video game published by Enix for the Game Boy Color. It is the second Dragon Warrior Monsters game for the Game Boy Color and features two different versions of the same game, Cobi's Journey (released as Dragon Quest Monsters 2 - Maruta No Fushigi Na Kagi - Ruka no Tabidachi in Japan) and Tara's Adventure (released as Dragon Quest Monsters 2: Maruta No Fushigi Na Kagi - Iru no Bouken in Japan). Both games were remade in 2002 for the PlayStation in a compilation game called Dragon Quest Monsters 1+2 and released only in Japan. The Nintendo 3DS version combined both games into one and was released only in Japan in 2014 with the title Dragon Quest Monsters 2: Iru and Luca's Marvelous Mysterious Key. The 3DS version was later brought to iOS, Android on August 6, 2020, in Japan.

== Gameplay ==
Dragon Warrior Monsters 2 allows the player to form a team of monsters to train and use in combat. Depending on which version of the game players buy, Dragon Warrior Monsters 2: Cobi's Journey or Dragon Warrior Monsters 2: Tara's Adventure, they control either Cobi or Tara, but the titles are nearly identical in gameplay and story. Both games, however, possess unique collections of monsters and magic keys. Instead of the original games focus on randomized dungeons, this title focuses on static ones with tasks to complete, though randomized dungeons are still available for exploration.

The player can have three monsters out at a time, and the rest remain at the siblings fathers ranch. To catch monsters, players must encounter them and entice them by offering them food and treats, and at the end of battle if it has been won over will join the player. If players give the monsters they have caught food and affection, it makes them more likely to follow specific commands during battle. Monsters also learn skills over time through battle. Monsters can also be bred by taking any level 10 male and female monster pair to Professor Monster at the Starry Shrine, after which their offspring appears and the parents disappear. After the game story ends, players are free to find more magic keys and unlock more worlds for monster finding and breeding, as well as searching out new items. There are over three hundred monsters from eleven families to collect, including some from the then recently released Dragon Quest VII.

The game has Game Boy link cable support to facilitate two player battles against each other or together against the games AI, as well as allowing monster trading with players who had either version of the game. During player versus player combat, there is a possibility of stealing some of the other players monsters. To get all the keys available in the game, players must link up with another player playing the other version of the game. With the keys from the other title, all of the available worlds can be unlocked in the players own game. The PlayStation compilation featured improved graphics, new scenarios, and the ability to upload monsters players have caught to the i-Mode cellular version of the original Dragon Quest Monsters.

=== 3DS version ===
The Nintendo 3DS remake had new gameplay features such as a total of 800 monsters, allowed four monsters in a party, and featured several “G size” giant monsters. Players can also do a scout attack to see their probability of catching the monsters they encounter.

The remake also has a new way to breed monsters to be powerful; “S.S.” level faster than before called “New Life Fusion”. A system of creating your own monsters was also included, with players able to mix and match four different parts of a monsters body to create a custom one.

Players can also make use of Nintendos StreetPass system of fighting over WiFi, either sending their party out to fight another player, or downloading another players party to fight against without them. There is also a special monster called Dracky StreetPass users can find, and players can also customize their character avatars with different clothing options.

== Plot ==
Cobi and Tara are both in a family of monster breeders who have come to the island of Greatlog to make a living by opening a monster ranch. However, there is soon conflict with the island's prince Kameha and a character from the original Dragon Warrior Monsters named Warubou who is his assistant. Because of this duo's bad behavior, the island begins to sink, and Cobi or Tara must explore five different worlds to find magic keys, and the plug, to save the island. In the Nintendo 3DS remake, the citizens are disturbed by a new threat after the original story ends, with the siblings having to find the “Ultimate Key” to open the door to two new worlds called “New World” and the “Legendary Demonlords” with gigantic and powerful enemies.

== Development ==
The games used the largest cartridge available for the Game Boy Color game system, which was four megabytes. Enix developer John Lawrence stated that Enix wanted to give players options in Dragon Warrior Monsters 2 where they could play the game as a solo RPG, but created two parts of the game to encourage players to have a social experience of playing together like an enhanced version of the original Dragon Warrior Monsters or like Pokemon.

The 3DS remake was demonstrated at Jump Fiesta 2014 with a playable demo and trailer.

== Reception ==
Reception

Aggregate score
Aggregator	Score
GameRankings	(Cobi's Journey) 81% (Tara's Adventure) 81%

Review scores
Publication	Score
IGN	9/10
Nintendo Power	3.5/5
Famitsu	9/10, 8/10, 8/10, 9/10
RPGFan	79%

Dragon Warriors Monsters 2 was released in Japan on March 9, 2001. The week it was released, the game was the number one selling game in Japan and sold 501,081 copies. According to Famitsu, Dragon Warrior Monsters 2 has sold 1,592,728 copies in Japan, and was the number three best selling game in Japan in 2001.

Dragon Warrior Monsters 2 received generally positive reception, holding an average rating of 81% on Game Rankings for both versions. Like Dragon Warrior Monsters before it, this game was immediately compared to Pokémon, a series with similar monster-catching gameplay. However, IGN regarded it as being more than just a mere "Pokémon clone", though also comparing it to the game Monster Rancher. RPGFan praised the system of breeding monsters as “incredibly fun”, and noted the high degree of replay value because of the post-story monster collecting activities players can do.

PlayStation compilation Dragon Quest Monsters 1+2 received a 33 out of 40 by Famitsu magazine. The game was the 38th best-selling game of 2002 with 292,275 copies.

== Remake ==
Dragon Quest Monsters 2: Iru and Luca's Marvelous Mysterious Key (ドラゴンクエストモンスターズ2 イルとルカの不思議なふしぎな鍵, Doragon Kuesto Monsutāzu 2: Iru to Ruka no Fushigi na Fushigi na Kagi), is a remake of Dragon Warrior Monsters 2 developed and published by Square Enix exclusively for the Nintendo 3DS. The remake incorporates both Tara's Adventure and Cobi's Journey in one game. After strong sales of the remake of the original Dragon Warrior Monsters as Dragon Quest Monsters: Terry’s Wonderland 3D, a remake of Dragon Warrior Monsters 2 was announced. Unlike most Dragon Quest titles, this game was developed by Square Enix itself.

The game was released in Japan both as a digital download on the Nintendo eShop, and in retail stores on February 6, 2014. The game also has a special 3DS bundle in Japan as well, which includes both the Dragon Quest Monsters 2 3DS XL, and a physical copy of the game. As of February 2014, the game had sold 634,433 copies. Dragon Quest Monsters 2 was the 8th best-selling game in Japan in 2014, having sold 802,173 copies. The game was re-released as an “Ultimate Hit” title on March 12, 2015.
