= Dragon Quest Treasures =

2022 video game

- Developer: Tose
- Publisher: Square Enix
- Directors: Shungo Hirano; Kana Inagaki
- Producer: Taichi Inuzuka
- Designer: Yoshihito Takagi
- Programmer: Yuta Tonari
- Artist: Akira Toriyama
- Writers: Shungo Hirano; Fuminori Ishikawa
- Composer: Koichi Sugiyama
- Series: Dragon Quest
- Engine: Unreal Engine 4
- Platforms: Nintendo Switch, Windows
- Release: Nintendo Switch; December 9, 2022; Windows; July 14, 2023
- Genre: Action role-playing
- Mode: Single-player

Dragon Quest Treasures is a 2022 action role-playing game developed by Tose and published by Square Enix. A spin-off of the Dragon Quest series, the game takes place on the floating continent of Draconia and follows the siblings Erik and Mia from Dragon Quest XI during their childhood days in search of seven legendary Dragonstones. Dragon Quest Treasures was released for the Nintendo Switch in December 2022 and Windows in July 2023. It received a mixed reception from critics.

== Gameplay ==
Dragon Quest Treasures is an action role-playing game in the Dragon Quest series. The player travels throughout the open world, which is a set of five islands on the back of a dead dragon. The player collects monsters, finds buried treasures, and builds a base to store the treasure in. The monsters each have one of five special abilities, called Fortes: Sprint, Launch, Glide, Stealth, and Scan. The player uses these abilities to explore the world. While the player can collect many monsters, only three can be taken from the base at a time with the main characters, which limits the player's combination of abilities. In addition to treasure hunting, the player undertakes quests from residents of the islands, generally to deliver items.

== Plot ==
Dragon Quest Treasures is a prequel to Dragon Quest XI. It follows two characters from that game, the siblings Erik and Mia. The pair of children, looking for adventure, journey to Draconia, a group of islands in the clouds. They search the island for treasure, especially the seven legendary Dragonstones, build a base to store it, and fight pirates looking to steal from them.

== Development ==
The game was first announced on May 27, 2021, as a spinoff title to Dragon Quest XI. It was released for the Nintendo Switch on December 9, 2022, and for Windows on July 14, 2023.

== Reception ==
Reception

Aggregate scores
Aggregator	Score
Metacritic	NS: 72/100; PC: 81/100
OpenCritic	59% recommend (Note: Based on 59 reviews)

The game received a mixed reception for the Switch version and a generally favorable reception for the Windows version, according to review aggregator Metacritic. RPGFan praised the "cute story" and interesting world, but said the combat was weak and the game was overall more insubstantial than the main Dragon Quest games. Siliconera summarized the game as a "massive to-do list", though "one filled with personality". They felt that the treasure hunting and gameplay were fun, but that the number and categories of quests became "overwhelming and exhausting".
