= Dragon Quest Monsters: Joker 3 =

2016 video game

- Developer: Tose
- Publisher: Square Enix
- Director: Shotaro Ozeki
- Producer: Taichi Inuzuka
- Designer: Takeshi Uchikawa
- Programmer: Hideki Orita
- Artist: Akira Toriyama
- Writers: Takeshi Uchikawa; Koichiro Tsuro
- Composer: Koichi Sugiyama
- Series: Dragon Quest Monsters
- Platform: Nintendo 3DS
- Release: JP: March 24, 2016; Professional: JP: February 9, 2017
- Genre: Role-playing
- Modes: Single-player, multiplayer

Dragon Quest Monsters: Joker 3 (Note: Japanese: ドラゴンクエストモンスターズ ジョーカー3, Hepburn: Doragon Kuesuto Monsutāzu Jōkā Suri) is a 2016 role-playing video game developed by Tose and published by Square Enix for the Nintendo 3DS. It is the sequel to Dragon Quest Monsters: Joker 2 (2010), and is the sixth game in the Dragon Quest Monsters series.

Dragon Quest Monsters: Joker 3 Professional, an expanded version of the game, was released in February 2017. Professional is the final entry in the Joker series.

== Gameplay ==
The top screen of the Nintendo 3DS shows a third-person perspective of the main character and the world around him, called "Break World", while the bottom screen shows a map of the nearby area, with the current goal circled in red. The protagonist carries a device known as a Reactor, which can be used to discover hidden objects or paths. Some paths require the player to be riding a monster to traverse. Players will be able to ride on the 500 different monsters that populate the game world. The monsters come in either land, sea, or sky varieties, meaning that different types monsters are required to traverse different paths. Players can also equip them with accessories and level them up. Leveling up a monster can give it new abilities, such as the ability to do more jumps in a row and therefore access areas previously out of reach. The Reactor device can also be used to scan monsters to discover information about them. If the player attacks a monster while riding, the other monster begins the battle stunned or knocked out. A competitive mini-game is included called "Great Riders Cup" that uses the monster riding system of the main game and allows up to four players to compete either with the game AI or with local players or others over Wifi. The game also utilizes the Nintendo 3DS's “StreetPass Battles”, allowing players to play against others they might meet while going about their day The games protagonist can be visually customized with different color for hair, scarf, boots, pants, and gloves. Monsters can also be color customized by finding and rescuing a monster called Color Fondue who can perform "Color Fusion" on monsters a player controls.

== Plot ==
The games protagonist suffers from amnesia and must search the world to remember his past. A mysterious girl, an old woman, and a tribe of monsters will all assist him in his quest, while a figure called the Dark Master, who calls himself a "human hunter", pursues the protagonist with powerful monsters that have awakened their latent dark powers.

== Development ==
In July 2015, series creator Yuji Horii discussed the third title in the Dragon Quest Monsters: Joker, featuring a new logo designed by Akira Toriyama. A game trailer was shown at Jump Festa 2016 featuring the titles new art style and large variety of monsters. Demos of the game were released for Japanese Nintendo 3DS game consoles in early March 2016. Those that completed the demo were given a code for a free present in the full game. A special wallpaper designed by Toriyama was released on the game's website to commemorate the game's launch.

== Reception ==
The first week of sales in Japan exceeded 368,000, making it the top selling game in Japan. Famitsu gave the game a 35/40 rating. RPGamer gave the game a 3.5 of 5, praising the graphics and the ability to interact and ride many monsters, but noted that achieving late game high level abilities and monsters was difficult without a guide.

Dragon Quest Monsters: Joker 3 Professional debuted at number one in Japan in mid-February 2017, selling 122,051 units.
