= Dragon Quest Monsters: Caravan Heart =

2003 video game

- Japanese box art
- Developer: Tose
- Publisher: Enix
- Director: Makoto Somei
- Producer: Yoshito Taniuchi
- Designer: Fuminori Ishikawa
- Programmers: Taro Osaka; Hideyasu Goto; Takuya Ijichi; Hirokazu Ohashi
- Artist: Akira Toriyama
- Writer: Fuminori Ishikawa
- Composer: Koichi Sugiyama
- Series: Dragon Quest Monsters
- Platform: Game Boy Advance
- Release: JP: March 29, 2003
- Genre: Role-playing
- Mode: Single-player

Dragon Quest Monsters: Caravan Heart (Note: Japanese: ドラゴンクエストモンスターズ キャラバンハート, Hepburn: Doragon Kuesuto Monsutāzu Kyaraban Hāto) is the third game in the Dragon Quest Monsters series, released only in Japan by Enix for the Game Boy Advance. The game was simultaneously announced with Dragon Quest VIII in Famitsu in 2002. Like the other Dragon Quest titles, development of Caravan Heart was led by Yuji Horii.

It is the second Dragon Quest game to be released for the Game Boy Advance (after Torneko no Daibouken 2 Advance). Caravan Heart features the character Prince Kiefer from Dragon Quest VII, as the game acts as a prequel to the PlayStation game. This is also the last game released under the Enix name, since the merger between Square and Enix was finalized a few days later, on April 1, 2003.

== Gameplay ==
Battle in the game.

When defeating monsters in Caravan Heart, the player can occasionally gain "monster hearts" which can be used to merge into a monster for a new more powerful form. Humans also fight in the battles with the monsters in this installment. The human characters have access to 20 character classes, like hunter, bard, fighter, dancer, mage, and mapper. Players choose which characters to guard the caravan and how to array them in its defense. The mapper job is new and allows players to see the terrain around the caravan. Other differences include a caravan that the player must travel around in, allowing them to add both monsters and humans to their party. The caravan can have up to twelve members in it at a time, and each wagon can only hold a certain amount of weight. A players camp grows as the game goes on, and the more allies that travel with the protagonist, the larger the camp grows. The camp ends up becoming much like a town, with things like an Inn to heal the players party or a shop to buy equipment. To evolve monsters, players can put two monster hearts into one of their own monsters and cause it to be reborn as a more powerful monster. The game also features route mapping, with the game helping identify the path the uses the least amount of food. Players can have up to three carriages at any one time and twelve friends and three monsters guarding it.

== Plot ==
The protagonist is Kiefer who appeared originally in Dragon Quest VII. On Prince Kiefer's tenth birthday, the prince was looking for a way to cause a little trouble and snuck out of Gran Estard Castle. This makes his father very angry, and when Kiefer is finally caught, he hides in his room. While hiding in the closet, a masked figure that calls herself The Master of the Illusions, Magarugi appears and tells Kiefer that if he finds the Orbs of Loto, he will be given one wish. Kiefer is pulled into the spirit's realm of Torland, the world of Dragon Quest II. When he first arrives, he encounters a caravan with a weak leader, Luin. Luin is also searching for the Orbs to save his sick parents. After their first battle together, the Caravan asks Kiefer to lead them. All together, they must travel the world in order to find the cure for Luin's sick parents and allow Kiefer to return to Estard Island.

== Development ==
Caravan Heart was developed by external company Tose and published by series publisher Enix. The scenario was written by Fuminori Ishikawa. Recurring artist Akira Toriyama and composer Koichi Sugiyama returned to their established roles. Franchise creator Yuji Horii acted in a supervisory role. It was the third Monsters entry developed in a row. The series was designed as a celebratory one, bringing together fan favorite monsters. To create the illusion of 3D graphics, the game made use of affine transformation. The game released in Japan on March 29, 2003.

== Reception ==
Caravan Heart was a top-seller during the time of its release, with over 538,000 units sold within three months of its release and 593,000 units sold to date. The game was given a 35 out of 40 by Famitsu magazine, netting a Platinum Award from the publication. RPGamer gave the game a 3 out of 5, praising the games easy “pick up and play” simplicity, but also noting that it doesn't show off the graphic or sound capabilities of the Game Boy Advance very well.
