= Dragon Quest Monsters: Joker =

2006 video game

- North American box art
- Developer: Tose
- Publisher: Square Enix
- Director: Toshimichi Wada
- Producer: Taichi Inuzuka
- Designers: Yuji Horii; Shigeki Nakadera; Atsushi Narita
- Programmer: Takayuki Iwakura
- Artist: Akira Toriyama
- Writers: Yuji Horii; Shigeki Nakadera; Atsushi Narita
- Composer: Koichi Sugiyama
- Series: Dragon Quest Monsters
- Platform: Nintendo DS
- Release: JP: December 28, 2006; NA: November 6, 2007; AU: March 13, 2008; EU: March 14, 2008
- Genre: Role-playing
- Modes: Single-player, multiplayer

Dragon Quest Monsters: Joker is a 2006 role-playing video game developed by Tose and published by Square Enix for the Nintendo DS. It is the fourth installment of the Dragon Quest Monsters series. This was the first game in the series to have online play, done using Nintendo Wi-Fi. A sequel, Dragon Quest Monsters: Joker 2, was released in 2010.

== Gameplay ==
Dragon Quest Monsters: Joker is the first game in the Dragon Quest Monsters subseries to be in 3D. It uses cel-shaded animation, and the battles are of the same type in other Dragon Quest games: commands are issued in a turn based style, then are executed in full 3D.

The player's avatar is that of a tanned, grey-haired youth with an editable name. He dreams of becoming a world-famous monsters 'scout', which is a tamer of wild monsters who uses them in battle. The battle system itself is very similar to previous Dragon Quest Monsters games. The player controls up to three monsters that make up the party, and can issue them direct orders or set them to one of 5 AI settings. The main character does not directly participate in battles except for when the player uses items. Joker does not have random battles. The only way to encounter enemies is to run into one on the overworld. The monsters can be seen, avoided, and attacked from their back to get a free attack round. The game takes place in the region known as Green Bays, consisting of seven islands. A jet-ski is used to travel from one island to another, with specific paths defined for every couple of piers. However, the main character may notice uncharted islands beyond some of the main islands. The chances for this are completely random and are not located on the main map. Pirates may also appear when traveling between islands, with the pirate captain, Crow, counting as a rare monster.

The game also has a Nintendo Wi-Fi element. The player connects to the server, and their monster team is ranked. The DS then downloads a set of opponents to battle. The battles are against the monster teams of higher and higher ranked other players. For each battle you win, you get a reward, either an item or a monster. These rewards change daily and can range from unexciting items to rare monsters such as liquid metal slimes. This feature is designed to be used once per day. The player can only fight one set of opponents, and get a reward once each day. The service was shut down on April 1, 2011.

=== Skill system ===
Dragon Quest Monsters: Joker features a skill system based on the one from Dragon Quest VIII: Journey of the Cursed King. Skill points are gained on certain character levels, and these can be assigned to one of the monster's (up to) three skill sets, learning techniques or gaining stats boosts. Some skill sets can be upgraded by maxing them. Others can be unlocked when parents have specific skill sets mastered. When synthesizing, the resulting monster can choose its skill sets from those its parents had, the ones that monster naturally knows, and any new ones unlocked. There are also skill seeds, which can be found during the night, and give 3 skill points to the selected monster.

== Plot ==
The Hero, is a young boy, named Joker, who wishes to join the upcoming Monster Scouting Tournament taking place in the Green Bays island cluster. Having been imprisoned for attempting to join without permission, Joker meets with Warden Trump, his father and leader of CELL, a secretive monster research organization. Trump gives Joker permission to join the tournament, but only to spy on the proceedings. After choosing his first monster, the Hero heads for Domus Isle. After being told that the opening ceremony has been postponed, the Hero heads for Infant Isle to take the Scout's Pledge. After reaching the peak of the mountain, Joker witnesses a female scout attempting to scout a canine monster. The monster, who, unlike other monsters, can speak the human tongue, derides her attempt to tame him and escapes. The girl introduces herself as Solitaire.

After taking the Scout's Pledge and attending the opening ceremony, presided by Dr. Snap, the head of the Monster Scouting Organization, the Hero heads for Xeroph Isle, the desert island. After falling through quicksand into a cave, the Hero witnesses the monster that Solitaire tried to tame falling unconscious after being attacked by an orc. The Hero defeats the orc and takes the wolf to the island scoutpost to be healed, but the staff are unable to do anything due to never seeing him before. Strangely, Dr. Snap appears and heals the creature. Joker overhears Dr. Snap talking to the wolfpup about the Incarnus, a legendary creature that once saved Green Bays from destruction. After Dr. Snap leaves, the creature asks the Hero if he would accompany him to a shrine on the island, which he had been attempting to enter when Joker found him. The Hero agrees and the beast, Wulfspade, joins him.

The Hero and Wulfspade find the shrine and enter the innermost chamber where, after defeating a guardian Golem, Wulfspade transforms into a featherless avian creature, Hawkhart. After the Hero agrees to give Hawkhart the Scout's Mark, the prize for winning the tournament, Hawkhart joins him permanently. They travel to Palaish Isle where, after finding the island's shrine and defeating its guardian, Hawkhart transforms again into a primate creature, Cluboon. It is here that the creature reveals to the Hero his true identity: the Incarnus. He has appeared again at the sign of a great catastrophe, which he is trying to stop, and each transformation grants him greater power to do so.

After this, the Hero travels to Infern Isle, a zombie-infested island where a great disaster once took place, and from there to Celeste Isle, a large island with two great towered temples: the Temple of the Sun and the Temple of the Moon. The shrine on Celeste Isle is in a seemingly unreachable place, but the Hero is able to solve the puzzles of the Temple of the Sun and the Temple of the Moon and open the way to the shrine. He and the Incarnus then battle another guardian: afterwards, the Incarnus transforms again, this time into a reptilian creature known as a Diamagon.

The Heroes next destination is Fert Isle, a jungle island. While traveling to the shrine, the Hero notes that Fert Isle is alarmingly close to CELL HQ. He proceeds to escort the Incarnus to the highest level of Fert Isle's giant tree, where the island's Nexus Chamber is found. After defeating another guardian monster, the Incarnus assumes a new form called Wulfspade Ace, which could be described as a more powerful version of the Wulfspade form. He then tells the Hero that he is ready for the tournament.

The Hero competes in the tournament and wins. When he goes to receive the scout's mark, Dr. Snap gives him a fake and then corrupts the Incarnus, revealing his motives: he plans to open the gate to the dark world, and is going to use the Incarnus to do so. Having a negative premonition about Dr. Snap's plan and determined to purify the Incarnus somehow, the Hero pursues Dr. Snap to Fert Isle. When he obtains the Baryon Sphere from Warden Trump, a disaster strikes Infern Isle, presumably Dr. Snap's doing. The Hero arrives at Infern Isle and starts scaling up the volcano. Near the entrance to the inner volcano, the Hero must battle the Ace of Spades. After defeating the Ace of Spades, Joker uses the Baryon Sphere, purifying the Incarnus. The Hero arrives at the peak of the volcano. There awaits Dr. Snap, who tries to corrupt the Incarnus again, seeing he is back to normal, but Snap runs out, and preoccupies Joker with a Buffalogre and a mohawker to defeat, to prevent himself from being stopped. The Hero defeats both monsters, and at that time Snap has collected enough dark matter to corrupt the Incarnus, but clumsily lets all the dark matter fall on him, transforming him into a monster, and attacks the Hero, beginning the final battle. After the Hero wins the battle the Incarnus seals the portal, takes the mark, transforms into its true form and disappears. Later on, after the Hero is advised by Solitaire to go back to Infant Isle, the Incarnus reappears at the Scout's Stone and rejoins the Hero.

== Development ==
Developed by behind the scenes game developer Tose, Dragon Quest Monsters: Joker is the first Dragon Quest game to feature Wi-Fi capabilities. Yuji Horii, famous for leading the development for all of the Dragon Quest games, added new gameplay elements to this installment, such as "scouting" for monsters. Akira Toriyama, creator of Dragon Ball, also returned for Joker, creating the visuals for the game in his unique style. Completing the Dragon Quest team, Koichi Sugiyama composed the soundtrack for Joker.

== Reception ==
Reception

Aggregate score
Aggregator	Score
Metacritic	75/100

Review scores
Publication	Score
1Up.com	B
Eurogamer	7/10
GamePro	6.5 of 10
GameSpot	7.5 of 10
Hardcore Gamer	4.75/5
IGN	7.9 of 10
Nintendo World Report	6/10

Dragon Quest Monsters: Joker received fairly decent scores overall, gaining an average of 75/100 on Metacritic. GameSpot's Austin Shau gave the game a 7.5/10, or "Good", with mostly positive comments, but advised users to approach the intense level-grinding with caution. IGN gave a similar score, 7.9, citing the game's excellent graphics and over all quality. IGN stated that the game "should definitely surprise some newcomers to the franchise in the sheer amount of depth and versatility it presents." Nintendo Power gave the game 8/10, and defended Joker, saying it was not just a Pokémon pretender. Similarly, GameSpy gave Joker an 8/10, and enforced the idea that the game is more than just a copy of Pokémon. GameZone also gave the game a positive review with a score of 8/10. However, GamePro, who gave Joker a 3.25/5, felt the game was just "another monster catch-and-battle game" along the lines of Pokémon. The review also cited the Scouting to be tricky and that the battle camera can be annoying. Game Informer gave the game 8/10, with the game receiving the "Handheld Game of the Month" for the December 2006 issue. Japanese gaming magazine Famitsu gave the game a positive review with a total score of 36/40.

Dragon Quest Monsters: Joker sold 593,994 units in the first four days after release in Japan. To date, it has sold over 1.45 million units.
