= Dragon Warrior Monsters =

First video game in the Dragon Quest Monsters series

- North American cover
- Developer: Tose
- Publishers: JP: Enix; NA/EU: Eidos Interactive
- Producer: Yukinobu Chida (Note: Hitoshi Suino and Kenji Honda produced the North American version)
- Designer: Yuji Horii
- Programmer: Gao Matsumoto
- Artist: Akira Toriyama
- Writer: Yuji Horii
- Composer: Koichi Sugiyama
- Series: Dragon Quest Monsters
- Platforms: Game Boy Color, Mobile phones, PlayStation, Nintendo 3DS, iOS, Android, Nintendo Switch
- Release: Game Boy Color: JP: September 25, 1998; NA: January 25, 2000; EU: January 28, 2000; Mobile phones: JP: January 28, 2002; PlayStation: JP: May 30, 2002; Nintendo 3DS: JP: May 31, 2012; iOS, Android: JP: November 7, 2018; Nintendo Switch: JP: September 17, 2019
- Genre: Role-playing
- Modes: Single-player, multiplayer

Dragon Quest Monsters, (Note: Known in Japan as Dragon Quest Monsters: Terry no Wonderland (Japanese: ドラゴンクエストモンスターズ テリーのワンダーランド, Hepburn: Doragon Kuesuto Monsutāzu: Terī no Wandārando; lit. Dragon Quest Monsters: Terry's Wonderland) and in Europe as Dragon Quest Monsters.) released in North America as Dragon Warrior Monsters, is the first video game in the Dragon Quest Monsters series. It was released in Japan by Enix on September 25, 1998, and co-published by Eidos Interactive in Europe and North America in 2000. It was the first Dragon Quest game to be released in Europe. The game cartridge is compatible with both the black-and-white Game Boy and the Game Boy Color; a second printing of the game was made after the Game Boy Color itself was released. The game was remade for the PlayStation in a compilation Dragon Quest Monsters 1+2 Hoshi Furi no Yūsha to Bokujō no Nakamatachi. (Note: Dragon Quest Monsters 1+2 Hoshi Furi no Yūsha to Bokujō no Nakamatachi (Japanese: ドラゴンクエストモンスターズ1・2 星降りの勇者と牧場の仲間たち)) A mobile phone incarnation titled Dragon Quest Monsters i was released in Japan on January 28, 2002.

The game features the characters Terry and Milly from Dragon Quest VI when they were children, before the events in Dragon Quest VI. Dragon Warrior Monsters is often compared to the Pokémon series due to their similar gameplay. Critics set the games apart by noting the in-depth breeding system seen in this game.

In May 2012, a remake of the game for the Nintendo 3DS, titled Dragon Quest Monsters: Terry no Wonderland 3D, (Note: Dragon Quest Monsters: Terry no Wonderland 3D (Japanese: ドラゴンクエストモンスターズ テリーのワンダーランド3D; lit. Dragon Quest Monsters: Terry's Wonderland 3D)) was released only in Japan. Later in November 2018, the remake was released for smartphones. The original version was released on Nintendo Switch in September 2019.

== Gameplay ==
The game follows Terry as he attempts to save his sister. Instead of fighting in battle, Terry is able to recruit monsters into his party. When fighting random battles, Terry can set out meat, which may coax the monster into joining the party at the end of the battle. Terry can also breed two monsters, combining them into a new, stronger monster. Excess monsters can be placed on the Farm, a storage place for monsters. They can be picked up or dropped off and there is an option to put monsters at the farm to sleep, which allows them to maintain their wilderness level, but not grow in level. There can be 19 awake and 19 asleep monsters at any one time. A monster's wilderness level lowers as Terry trains them, which makes them more likely to participate in battle. By leaving monsters at the farm awake, they become more wild.

Just like in most RPGs, monsters are able to gain experience points and level up after battles. Each monsters' requirements for experience points to level up varies, depending on their plus number or even what monster family they belong to. When they level up, they gain stats and sometimes skills. All monsters can carry a maximum of eight skills; if a monster can gain more than eight skills, players have the option of replacing old skills with new ones.

The player moves around to other worlds through warp gates which are located underneath the throne room. To access these gates, the player needs to defeat a certain class ranking. There are a certain number of areas in a world and at the last one, the player needs to defeat a boss. Some bosses in the game offer to join the player's party automatically, some have to be won over with meat, and some will not join at all. Other gates are hidden throughout Great Tree, such as one in the library that is only accessible after befriending over 100 different monsters.

In this game the player fights in the arena and goes through ranks that consists of three different battles that must be won before the player can advance to the next ranking. Each rank provides harder challenges: the higher the rank, the harder the monsters. The battles start at Rank G and go to Rank D. Later in the game players can go from Rank C to Rank A and then Rank S. These battles open up gates for the character to explore and are necessary to progress through the story.

Tiny Medals are scattered throughout different worlds randomly and are picked up by the player. A man collects these medals, who is later revealed to be the king of Great Tree, and will give certain monster eggs for how many the player gives to him. Also, Foreign Masters may appear while in other worlds. These encounters with other trainers can result in battle. There are different types of trainers that will give or do something for the player if they are defeated. These trainers' monsters may also join the player if they are given meat.

The game also comes compatible with the PlayStation's i-mode adaptor, allowing players to upload monsters from the game onto the mobile phone version of Dragon Quest Monsters.

=== Breeding ===
After beating Class F in the Arena, the player can breed monsters if they are at level 10 or above at the Shrine of Starry Night, which is taken care of by the current Master Monster Tamer. Breeding requires one male and one female monster. The result of the breeding will be an egg, containing a level 1 monster which has characteristics of both parents, including skills and stats. The egg can then be left in the monster farm or hatched, which costs a small fee. The monster born will have a plus number next to it, the number generally signifying the greatness of the monster's stats, the higher being the better. It costs more money to hatch a monster with a higher plus number than one with no plus number. Also, the number beside the plus multiplied by two is added to the limit for the maximum level for the monster.

Once the Egg Evaluator is available for use, eggs can have the gender of the monster they're containing checked and changed. Both requires a small fee which is paid to the Egg Evaluator. The fee increases depending on the monster's plus number.

A monster that was created through breeding has much higher stats and many more abilities than a monster that was found in the wild. Thus, it is much harder to complete the game without breeding many generations. Breeding is also the only way to acquire certain monsters. The monsters that bred to make the egg leave the player.

== Story ==
In the days before Dragon Quest VI, when Terry and Milly were just children, a strange monster appeared one night and snatched Milly away. Soon after, another monster, similar to the kidnapper, appeared and told Terry his sister was kidnapped by the evil Warubou. He informs Terry that his name is Watabou and must accompany him to the Kingdom of GreatTree. After his arrival, Terry met the King and received Slib the slime, his first monster to train. If Terry wins the Monster Trainer's Starry Night Tournament, he will be granted a wish. So Terry sets out with his team to explore the many monster dungeons to win the tournament and rescue his sister.

== Nintendo 3DS remake ==
The Nintendo 3DS remake was announced in September 2011 by publisher Square Enix, and was said to include new monsters, a new story, and additional monsters from Dragon Quest Monsters: Joker 2 Professional. The game was shown as a playable demo at Jump Magazines Jump Festa in December 2011.

The game features include shifting from day to night, randomized dungeon layouts, combat with four opponents on each side, and a total of 609 monsters, including all the monsters from the original Game Boy Color release. The game also features an in-game Wi-Fi Store in the bazaar area. The Wi-Fi Store purchases can be made with the in-game currency, gold. The store's items changes daily, and the Wi-Fi item store is only open after doing that day's Wi-Fi Ranking Battle. It can be used to buy monster eggs, (white, silver, and rainbow eggs) skill books, consumable items, and some weapons. Players have the ability to import monsters they have raised from Dragon Quest Monsters: Joker 2 and Dragon Quest Monsters: Joker 2 Professional (Rank A and higher only) through a free app upon completion of the game. At that point, players can access "Ultimate Combination", where new abilities become available for the players monsters, and the ability to create "super monsters" is possible. X and XY monsters (+, and +* in the original Japanese version) in Joker 2/Professional could be obtained by synthesizing 2 of the same monsters, level 20 for X, and level 50 for XY monsters. However, the method to create them is different in Terry's Wonderland 3D. Both duplicate monsters of different gender have to have their monster's rank points +25 for + monsters, and +50 for +* monsters. In Dragon Quest Monsters: Terry's Wonderland 3D, there is a +, and +* for every monster, while in Joker 2/Professional not every monster had them. After synthesizing a few of these monsters, a new synth will happen immediately afterwards, making a demon book monster that knows said monsters skills. There are more than a few kinds of demon book monsters ranging from small size to large size monsters. Using the StreetPass feature of the Nintendo 3DS, players can fight other players and attempt to steal their monsters. Miis are also utilized in the game, allowing players to customize their character's clothing. Online play is supported, including "Grand Prix" mode for a maximum of eight players.

In B3 of the Great Tree, one of the two gates there goes to an arena where players can battle the top 3 users who've won that day's ranking battle. Players can do auto commands, AI battle tactics, and use items. The users are AIs, and their data are recorded from said day's ranking battle. Players get both bonus points (for Wi-Fi Ranking Battle) and gold. The other gate there goes to a 100 battle survival course. After 50 battles, it auto saves. If a player loses between 51-100, they get to start back at battle 50. These battles can only be done once every 24 hours.

== Reception ==
Reception

Aggregate score
Aggregator	Score
GameRankings	80%

Review scores
Publication	Score
Electronic Gaming Monthly	7.63/10
Game Informer	8/10
GameSpot	8.7/10
IGN	9/10
Nintendo Power	7.2/10

In Japan, Dragon Warrior Monsters sold 2.35 million copies, of which 1.22 million were sold during 1998—making it the fourth-highest selling game of the year. The North American version sold 60,000 copies by April 2000.

Dragon Warrior Monsters received mostly positive reviews, receiving an average score of 78.9% from GameRankings based on 12 reviews. The game was compared to Pokémon by critics because of its similar gameplay, many telling fans to play the game as a means of waiting for the release of Pokémon Gold and Silver. GameSpot.com praised the game's visuals, music, and gameplay, stating that the game "may not have the cutesy, over-merchandised appeal of Pokémon, but the rock-solid gameplay makes it a worthwhile endeavor." IGN stated that Dragon Warrior Monsters features many of Pokémon's mechanics, "but better," commenting on the game's large cast of monsters and battles. However, IGN also made a distinction between the two games, saying that Pokémon's ability to capture any wild Pokémon with a Poké Ball as opposed to taming monsters was a better idea.

RPGFan.com reviewed the game, mentioning that the game's 215 monsters gave the game a large amount of depth, and that the "bulk and the most fun aspect of the game is catching monsters and breeding them to get more powerful monsters." Gaming-Age.com similarly pointed out that the breeding aspect of Dragon Warrior Monsters set it apart from other monster-catching games, noting that its monsters "don't quite have the extra 'omph' that the Pokemon [sic] creatures do", but that "none of the creatures are so super cutesy that they begin to get on your nerves."

PlayStation compilation Dragon Quest Monsters 1+2 received a 33 out of 40 by Famitsu magazine. The game was the 38th best-selling game of 2002 with 292,275 copies.

The Nintendo 3DS remake sold 513,000 copies in its first week. Publisher Square Enix sold through 93.96 percent of their stock and several stores sold out of product. A special version of the Nintendo 3DS bundled with the game also sold 100,000 units in the first week. As of January 2013, the game has 920,000 copies. As a promotion, fast food franchise McDonald's gave away a Slanin Purple on May 31, 2012 in Happy Meals to those who had copies of the game, and on June 9 they gave away Ramia, a monster from Dragon Warrior III. The promotion ended June 21, 2012. Convenience stores and other establishments in Japan also gave away monsters, including a dimension traveling dragon, a Gold Killing Machine, and Tyrannosaurus Wrecks from Dragon Quest IX.
