= Dragon Quest Monsters: Joker 2 =

2010 video game

- North American cover art
- Developer(s): Tose
- Publisher(s): Nintendo: JP: Square Enix
- Director(s): Toshimichi Wada
- Producer(s): Taichi Inuzuka
- Designer(s): Yuji Horii
- Programmer(s): Takayuki Iwakura
- Artist(s): Akira Toriyama
- Writer(s): Takeshi Uchikawa
- Composer(s): Koichi Sugiyama
- Series: Dragon Quest Monsters
- Platform(s): Nintendo DS
- Release: JP: April 28, 2010; NA: September 19, 2011; EU: October 7, 2011 Professional; JP: March 31, 2011
- Genre(s): Role-playing
- Mode(s): Single-player, multiplayer

Dragon Quest Monsters: Joker 2 is a 2010 role-playing video game developed by Tose and published by Nintendo for the Nintendo DS. It is the sequel to Dragon Quest Monsters: Joker (2006) and is the fifth game in the Dragon Quest Monsters series. A sequel, Dragon Quest Monsters: Joker 3, was released in 2016.

== Gameplay ==
Joker 2's gameplay follows closely to its predecessor. Players explore areas and tame wild monsters into their party. Monsters fight in turn-based combat and grow stronger. The battle system itself is very similar to previous Dragon Quest Monsters games. The player controls up to three monsters that make up the party, and can issue them direct orders or set them to one of 4 AI settings. This game features two new monster sizes: large monsters, which use up two spaces on one of the player's two benches, and gargantuan monsters, who take up an entire bench on their own. The main character, who is henceforth referred to as the Hero, does not directly participate in battles except for when the player uses items. He can, however, use any item in his possession and not just the ones 'in hand'. 311 monsters from the Dragon Quest games appear in Joker 2, with a few new species, many from the original Dragon Warrior Monsters games This is the second game in the series to feature Wi-Fi support, after the first Joker game, and the first to support direct battling between players.

Square Enix released Joker 2 Professional, an expanded version of the game, on March 31, 2011. Professional features over 100 new monsters, as well as new regions and abilities, but the same story. Players are able to import their old monsters from the original game.

Joker 2 has Wi-Fi support and Square Enix has announced that up to eight players can connect to each other. The players can then battle their monster teams against each other in real time. The game will also keep track of the best players through leaderboards.

== Plot ==
The protagonist is a boy who wants to become the world greatest monster tamer, so he becomes a stowaway inside a container on an airship going to the Monster Scout Challenge. The boy is caught, but captain Rex Mayday lets the boy stay if he works on the ship. Before he can do that, however, the airship crashes on an unknown island. The hero awakens and then sets out to find the survivors of the crash. During his search, he travels into the forest of Treepidation and encounters an enormous worm.

He rescues a passenger from inside the monster, finding a strange medal as well. He then travels to a plains area known as the Doubtback. There, he finds another gargantuan monster, as well as what he believes is the ghost of Rex Mayday, the ship's captain; the ghost tells him to win the monster scout challenge. Soon after, he finds a cave filled with moles, and their leader, Don Mole, tells him after seeing the medal that he is hosting a monster scout challenge that the Hero will enter. When the challenge begins, the Hero enters and wins the first rank, prompting Don Mole to direct him to a glacier area called Iceolation. The Hero there finds another giant monster, as well as more passengers.

After winning another rank on the challenge, the Hero is sent by Don Mole to the alpine area of Cragravation. There, they find another giant monster, another passenger, and Captain Mayday. Mayday tells the Hero how to get to another area, Unshore; they find another giant monster there, as well as another ghost of a passenger who is still alive. Afterwards, Don Mole instructs the Hero to seek out the Medal of Merit in the Bemusoleum ruins, which he will need to take on the final rank of the monster scout challenge. Meeting another ghost and giant monster, the Hero finds the medal; when he returns to the challenge arena, he is met by a ghost who tells him that the moles of the island are charged with a sacred duty to find the one who could resurrect the Divine Battler, Leonyx. The humans who used to live on the island had corrupted him centuries prior into the malevolynx, which was then sealed into the Necropolis in the Bemusoleum before they fled the island; the ghosts the Hero had encountered were some of the spirits of those killed by the malevolynx.

The hero journeys and defeats the malevolynx; after they do, a monster called the Countess from the airship merges with the fiend to form Leonyx. They explain that the Countess was Leonyx's spirit, which was searching for a champion to heal it, and which by passing near the malevolynx caused the storm that crashed the ship. With Leonyx resurrected, the Hero's work on the island is finished. Lenoyx sends one of the giant monsters to take the airship off the island, and the Hero finally arrives at the original tournament. They easily succeed in reaching the final round, where they face Solitaire and win. After the main game is completed, they return to the island to continue training. Numerous sidequests and challenges are opened to the player, which lead to the player confronting and defeating the evil spirit, Rigor Mortex, which had corrupted Leonyx.

== Development ==
Game producer Taichi Inuzuka noted during the design phase that the presence of giant monsters such as Bjorn would give the game an “impressive” feel. Player versus player combat was added after fans expressed a great desire for it in the original Jokers game, and also to help enhance the games play time, though development of the feature was constant and difficult. Using the detailed artwork of Akira Toriyama, it was not hard to decide how statistically powerful each monster in the game would be.

== Reception ==
Reception

Aggregate score
Aggregator	Score
Metacritic	77/100

Review scores
Publication	Score
Famitsu	37/40
Game Informer	7.5/10
GameSpot	7/10
IGN	8.5/10
Nintendo Life	9/10

The game sold 1.2 million copies by July 2010. It was the top-selling game for Square Enix for the April to September period of 2010, the highest-selling game in Japan for the month of May, and the sixth-highest selling game in Japan for all of 2010.

The game received a 37 out of 40 from Famitsu, with one reviewer giving it a 10 and the other three awarding it a 9. IGN called the monster synthesis system “pure, addictive fun”, praising the excitement of catching hard to obtain monsters, though unlike Pokémon, there are fewer options for trying to obtain difficult to find or rare creatures. GameSpot praised the titles visuals as “surprisingly detailed”, and commented on the superb translation and its comedic dialogue. Game Informer noted that monster catching games could be a repetitive genre, but this title rewards players patience with skill points, dungeons, and enemy boss battles. Games Radar took an opposite view, saying of the games story “is so shopworn it's hard to take seriously”, and also complained of “stilted” dialogue and bad jokes. Nintendo Life called the game an iterative improvement over the original Joker title, mostly focused on modifying gameplay mechanics such as players switching our their monsters during battle. The reviewer also made clear that if players love catching and combining monsters, the “real fun” begins after the games story ends as many gameplay options then become available.

== Sequel ==
On March 24, 2016, six years after the second game was released, Dragon Quest Monsters: Joker 3 was released in Japan, No official English release has been announced; however, fan translations have been made which can be installed on Japanese copies of the game.
