= Koichi Sugiyama =

Japanese composer and conductor (1931–2021)

- すぎやま こういち
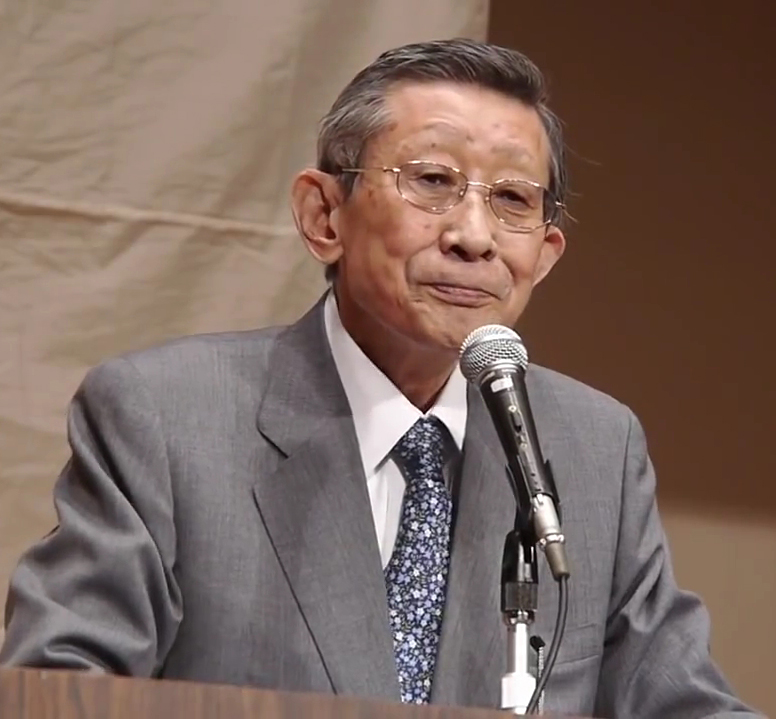
- Sugiyama in 2011
- Born: 椙山 浩一; April 11, 1931; Tokyo, Japan
- Died: September 30, 2021 (aged 90); Tokyo, Japan
- Education: University of Tokyo
- Occupations: Composer; conductor; orchestrator
- Employers: Nippon Cultural Broadcasting (1956–1958); Fuji Television (1958–1965)
- Musical career
- Genres: Symphonic; video game; jazz; kayōkyoku
- Years active: 1968–2021
- Label: SUGI Label
- Website: Sugimania

Koichi Sugiyama (すぎやま こういち, Sugiyama Kōichi; April 11, 1931 – September 30, 2021) was a Japanese composer, conductor, and orchestrator. He was best known for composing for the Dragon Quest franchise, along with several other video games, anime, film, television shows, and pop songs. Classically trained, Sugiyama was considered a major inspiration for other Japanese game music composers and was active from the 1960s until his death in 2021.

Sugiyama was also a council member of the Japanese Society for Rights of Authors, Composers, and Publishers (JASRAC), board member of the Japan Institute for National Fundamentals, and honorary chairman of the Japanese Backgammon Society. Prior to his death, the Japanese government honored him with Order of the Rising Sun and named him a Person of Cultural Merit. Sugiyama was also active in politics and activism, promoting ideas such as Japanese nationalism while denying Japanese war crimes.

== Career ==
=== Early life and television career ===
Sugiyama was born in Tokyo, Japan, on April 11, 1931. In high school, he began to write various small musical works. He attended the University of Tokyo and graduated with full honors in 1956. He then went into the reporting and entertainment sections of Nippon Cultural Broadcasting. He joined Fuji TV as a director in 1958. He left the station in 1965 to become a freelance director but had begun concentrating solely on musical composition and orchestration by 1968.

From the late 1960s to the early 1980s, Sugiyama composed for several musicals, commercials, kayōkyoku pop artists, animated movies, and television shows, such as Science Ninja Team Gatchaman: The Movie, The Sea Prince and the Fire Child, and Cyborg 009. He also assisted Riichiro Manabe with the composition for Godzilla vs. Hedorah, composing the record single of the soundtrack and conducting for some of the tracks. Sugiyama also wrote the 1976 single Heart Dorobō for the Japanese pop trio Candies.

In a little known foray for Matsushita Electric, Sugiyama composed, arranged & conducted a track called Disco Check, for the fourth volume of Technics '80 Audio Inspection records, performed with 24 instruments by the Nova Studio Group.

=== Dragon Quest and other video games ===
Sugiyama's first contact with Enix was by a fan letter he wrote them regarding a PC shogi game in the early 1980s. In response, Enix's staff asked for Sugiyama to compose music for their games. Sugiyama started composing for the PC-8801, and was working for Enix at the time. His first project with the company was the 1986 game Wing-Man 2: Kītakurā no Fukkatsu. Later that year, he composed for his first major project, Dragon Quest. His classical score for the game was considered revolutionary for console video game music.

Sugiyama was one of the first video game composers to record with a live orchestra. In 1986 Enix released the CD Dragon Quest Suite, for which Sugiyama's music was performed by the Tokyo Strings Ensemble. The soundtrack's eight melodies, titled Opening, Castle, Town, Field, Dungeon, Battle, Final Battle, and Ending, set the template for many role-playing video game soundtracks released since then, some of which have been organized in a similar manner.

In 1987, he composed for Dragon Quest II. Music from the first two Dragon Quest games was performed at one of the first game music concerts, "Family Classic Concert". "Dragon Quest I Symphonic Suite" and "Dragon Quest II Symphonic Suite" were arranged and conducted by Sugiyama himself, and both were performed live by the Tokyo Strings Ensemble on August 20, 1987, at Suntory Hall in Tokyo. He subsequently held the "Family Classic Concerts" annually in Japan until 2019.

From 1987 to 1990, Sugiyama continued to compose for various other Enix games. In 1991, he introduced a series of video game music concerts, five in all, called the Orchestral Game Concerts, which were performed by the Tokyo City Philharmonic Orchestra and Tokyo Symphony Orchestra. The performances included music from over eighteen different video game composers, such as Koji Kondo, Yoko Kanno, Nobuo Uematsu, Keiichi Suzuki, as well as Sugiyama himself. These concerts were held from 1991 to 1996; during this time, Sugiyama composed for other video games and arranged for some of them to be performed in the Orchestral Game Concerts. He served as a sound producer on 1991's Master of Monsters, composed by Hayato Matsuo.

In September 1995, Sugiyama composed the Dragon Quest Ballet. It premiered in 1996, and has since been performed regularly over the years by the Star Dancers Ballet. During those years, he also released several Dragon Quest Symphonic Suites. In late 2004, he finished and released the Dragon Quest VIII soundtrack. In 2005, Sugiyama was holding a series of concerts in Japan with the Tokyo Metropolitan Symphony Orchestra with music from Dragon Quest VIII, as well as his classic compositions from the past. In August 2005, his music from Dragon Quest was performed live at the European Symphonic Game Music Concert, marking the first time that his music was performed by a live symphonic concert outside of Japan. Sugiyama later composed the score to Dragon Quest X and XI. A television drama played by actor Ken Yasuda detailing Sugiyama's involvement with Dragon Quest aired on Nippon TV on August 27, 2022.

Throughout his work Sugiyama repeatedly used motifs to maintain a consistency and nostalgic quality in the different installments. Each of the Dragon Quest games that he worked on included a nearly identical, upbeat theme track titled "Overture". Sugiyama composed more than 500 pieces of music in the 35 years he was involved in the Dragon Quest franchise. Sugiyama's style of composition has been compared to late Baroque and early Classical period styles. Earlier on in his career, Sugiyama said that his process for making music for games was based on seeing initial drafts on its setting and story.

Sugiyama's related hobbies included photography, traveling, building model ships, collecting old cameras, and reading. He has opened a camera section on his website, and also founded his own record label, SUGI Label, in June 2004. Sugiyama also composed the fanfares for the opening and closing of the gates at the Tokyo and Nakayama Racecourses. He was given the Order of the Rising Sun, 4th Class, by the Japanese government in 2018 before also being named a Person of Cultural Merit by them two years later. Sugiyama died from septic shock at the age of 90 on September 30, 2021.

== Political activities and beliefs ==
Sugiyama engaged in Nanjing Massacre denial, stating that the facts regarding it were "selective" in nature. He was one of the signatories on "The Facts", a full-page ad published by The Washington Post on June 14, 2007, that was written by a number of Japanese politicians and academics in response to the passing of United States House of Representatives House Resolution 121, which sought an official apology from the Government of Japan regarding their involvement of using comfort women, sexual slaves used by Japanese soldiers during World War II. Sugiyama was also a board member of the Japan Institute for National Fundamentals.

In 2012, Sugiyama wrote an editorial saying that he thought Japan was in a state of "civil war between Japanese and anti-Japanese". Giving examples, he argued that the Japanese media portrayed acts of patriotism negatively, such as performing the National Anthem of Japan or raising the Japanese flag. He further thought that the demands of the Japanese anti-nuclear movement to immediately dismantle all nuclear energy facilities without offering any alternative solutions would affect the country's ability to defend itself.

In 2015, Sugiyama made an appearance on the Japanese Culture Channel Sakura television program Hi Izuru Kuni Yori where he was shown agreeing with views shared by Japanese politician Mio Sugita who said there was no need for LGBT education in Japanese schools, as well as dismissing concerns about high suicide rates among the community. Sugiyama added that the lack of children born from LGBT couples was an important topic to discuss, also suggesting that Japan was more empowering to women than South Korea. He later made a statement seemingly indicating greater acceptance by saying that LGBT couples have existed throughout human history and he supported the use of governments to occasionally help them.

== Notable works ==
=== Video games ===
Works primarily featuring re-used compositions are omitted.

Video game scores
Year	Title	Ref.
1986	Wingman 2	
1986	Dragon Quest	
1987	Dragon Quest II	
1987	Jesus	
1987	Gandhara: Buddha no Seisen	
1987	Animal Land Murder Case	
1987	World Golf II	
1987	Wingman Special	
1988	Dragon Quest III	
1988	Angelus: Akuma no Fukuin	
1990	Dragon Quest IV	
1990	4.6 Billion Year Story	
1990	World Golf III	
1991	Akagawa Jirō no Yurei Ressha	
1991	Jesus II	
1991	Tetris 2 + BomBliss	
1992	Dragon Quest V	
1992	Hanjuku Hero: Aa, Sekaiyo Hanjukunare...!	
1992	E.V.O.: Search for Eden	
1993	Monopoly	
1993	Torneko's Great Adventure	
1994	Itadaki Street 2 (Note: Soundtrack by Kyōhei Tsutsumi except for "Koya wo Yuku" by Sugiyama)	
1995	Mystery Dungeon: Shiren the Wanderer	
1995	Dragon Quest VI	
1996	Shiren the Wanderer GB	
1998	Dragon Quest Monsters	
1999	Torneko: The Last Hope	
2000	Dragon Quest VII	
2000	Shiren the Wanderer 2	
2001	Dragon Quest Monsters 2	
2002	Torneko's Great Adventure 3	
2003	Dragon Quest Monsters: Caravan Heart	
2003	Slime Mori Mori Dragon Quest	
2004	Dragon Quest VIII	
2005	Dragon Quest Heroes: Rocket Slime	
2006	Dragon Quest Monsters: Joker	
2009	Dragon Quest IX	
2010	Dragon Quest Monsters: Joker 2	
2011	Slime Mori Mori Dragon Quest 3	
2012	Dragon Quest X	
2017	Dragon Quest XI	

=== Film and television ===
Film and television scores
Year	Title	Role	Ref.
1967	Skyers 5	Opening theme	
1971	Return of Ultraman	Opening theme, "MAT Team no Uta", "Kaiju Ondo"	
1971	Godzilla vs Hedorah	"Defeat Hedorah"	
1975	Kum-Kum	Opening and ending themes	
1976	Manga Sekai Mukashi Banashi	"Watashi O Yobu No Wa Dare", "Memoir"	
1978	Science Ninja Team Gatchaman: The Movie	Music	
1978	Gatchaman II	Music	
1979	Cyborg 009	Music	
1980	Space Runaway Ideon	Music	
1980	Cyborg 009: Legend of the Super Galaxy	Music	
1981	The Sea Prince and the Fire Child	Music	
1982	The Ideon: A Contact	Music	
1982	The Ideon: Be Invoked	Music	
1983	The Yearling	Music	
1989	Godzilla vs. Biollante	Music	
1991	Dragon Quest: The Adventure of Dai	Music	
1991	Dragon Quest: The Adventure of Dai - The Great Adventure of Dai	Music	
1992	Dragon Quest: The Adventure of Dai - Avan's Disciples	Music	
1992	Dragon Quest: The Adventure of Dai - Six Great Generals	Music	
1994	Magic Knight Rayearth	"Setsunakute"	
2019	Dragon Quest: Your Story	Music	
