= Hero (Dragon Quest V) =

Dragon Quest V protagonist

- Dragon Quest character
- The Hero and his pet Saber in Dragon Quest V
- First game: Dragon Quest V (1992)
- Created by: Yuji Horii
- Designed by: Akira Toriyama
- Voiced by: Japanese: Konami Yoshida (child), Ryō Horikawa (adult) (CD Theater); Riku Ônishi (child), Takeru Satoh (adult) (Your Story); English: Julian Lerner (child), Yuri Lowenthal (adult) (Your Story)

In-universe information
- Spouse: Bianca, Nera, or Debora

The Hero is the protagonist of Dragon Quest V. He starts the story as a child, the son of Pankraz, who suffers through various tragedies before growing up, getting married, and having children. Unlike previous Dragon Quest protagonists, he is not a Legendary Hero; instead, he is a monster tamer, a mechanic added due to the popularity of the character Healie from Dragon Quest IV. He was created by Yuji Horii and designed by Akira Toriyama.

He appears in other works, including the film Dragon Quest: Your Story, which has a similar story to the video game. In this film, he is called Luca, which created controversy when novelist Saori Kumi, who called him Luca in an earlier novelization of Dragon Quest V and sued Square Enix over its use. The Hero has received a positive reception, with critics commenting on how impactful his tragic life was and how iconic a design he had.

== Appearances ==
The Hero first appears in the video game Dragon Quest V as its protagonist, and must be given a name by the player. As a child, he goes on an adventure with a girl named Bianca and meeting a monster called a Great Sabrecat whom they name Saber, and is later kidnapped with a boy named Prince Harry by minions of a man named Ladja. The Hero's father, Pankraz, sacrifices his life to spare his son's life, telling him that the Hero's mother was still alive. The Hero and Harry are enslaved for 10 years before both eventually broke free. After discovering that his father was searching for the Legendary Hero and Zenithian gear, he goes on a quest to find this Hero and his mother. He discovers his skills as a monster tamer, meeting the now-adult Saber, who joins his party, and becomes able to recruit other monsters. He later finds a Zenithian shield in the possession of Rodrigo Briscoletti, who is offering it as a marriage proposal for his daughter Nera. To marry his daughter, he must find special objects, reuniting with Bianca along the way. Returning to Briscoletti with Bianca, Nera suggests that the Hero choose between her and Bianca. In the Nintendo DS version, Nera is given a sister, who insists she be an option. Regardless of who the Hero chooses, Briscoletti gives him the shield.

Journeying with his wife, he discovers that he is the heir to a kingdom. She falls pregnant, giving birth to a boy and girl before being kidnapped. The Hero leaves the children with Pankraz's friend Sancho to pursue her kidnappers, becoming turned to stone with his wife by Ladja after he reveals that he kidnapped her to prevent her Zenithian blood from being passed down. The Hero is discovered eight years later by Sancho and his children, who manage to cure him of his petrification. The son is revealed to be the Legendary Hero, and they manage to find the Hero's wife. Ladja is eventually killed. He finds his mother, who is then killed by Ladja's master, Grandmaster Nimzo.

He was considered for inclusion as a playable character in the Super Smash Bros. Ultimate fighting game as part of the "Hero" character. He was ultimately not chosen due to his use of a staff instead of a sword, the weapon that the other Hero characters chose to use in Ultimate. This character instead stars the Heroes from Dragon Quest III, Dragon Quest IV, Dragon Quest VIII, and Dragon Quest XI.

He appears as the protagonist of the film Dragon Quest: Your Story with the name Luca, which has a similar plot to Dragon Quest V. In this version of the film, he befriends a Slime named Gootrude and marries Bianca. As Ladja dies, he opens a portal, causing the world to become distorted. Luca learns that the world is a virtual simulation of Dragon Quest V and that the world is being distorted by a computer virus. He also learns that Gootrude is an antivirus software, giving him a sword that he uses to destroy the virus and restore the game to normal.

== Concept and creation ==
The Hero was created by Yuji Horii and designed by Akira Toriyama. Despite all previous Dragon Quest games having the starring character be the legendary Hero, the protagonist of Dragon Quest V is the first game not to be the legendary Hero. The Hero is a monster tamer, able to recruit certain monsters he encounters. The decision to make monsters playable characters was inspired by the character Healie from Dragon Quest IV.

In the film, the Hero is named Luca and is voiced by Takeru Sato in Japanese. Using the Luca name for the Hero in Dragon Quest: Your Story was part of a controversy involving novelist Saori Kumi. Kumi alleged that Square Enix took the Hero's name and other characters' names from her novelization of Dragon Quest V, leading to her suing.

== Reception ==
The Hero has received a positive reception and was ranked number one in a poll by Magmix of readers' favorite Dragon Quest heroes. Magmix writer Hiromu Tashita identified the Hero of Dragon Quest V, alongside the Hero of Dragon Quest IV, as the unhappiest character in Dragon Quest due to the series of tragedies he goes through. Fellow Magmix writer Fumi-kun felt that, despite not being the canonical hero of the game, the struggles he overcomes give him the qualities of a hero. IGN Japan writer Kurabe Esra praised the Hero, saying that his story of going from a child to a parent was quite rare, comparing the extent of the Hero's suffering to the works of novelist Toyoko Yamasaki and arguing that being in an interactive medium made it more impactful. He also felt that the Hero was an iconic character, saying that his design was so iconic that it is recognized as being the face of the series. 4gamer writer Kenichi Maeyamada agreed with the notion that it was rare for storytelling to see a protagonist go through so much hardship, calling him one of his favorite characters ever and attributing his love of Dragon Quest to his tragic story. He also discussed how the Hero's survival contrasted with Prince Harry's, noting that as a wanderer, he would not have as much fanfare over his living. Final Fantasy XVI creative director and scenario writer Kazutoyo Maehiro noted that he was a fan of Dragon Quest V, adding that the Hero's story likely influenced him in making the story behind its protagonist, Clive Rosfield.

The petrification of the Hero and the passage of time during this scene received praise from Destructoid writer Chad Concelmo. He felt that the way it depicted time during his petrification was done in "one of the most creative and interesting ways ever," calling it one of his favorite scenes in a video game. He found that the way the Hero and player are forced to witness the passage of time made it impactful in a way that a game like Fallout 3, which has the player age up, does not. USgamer writer Kat Bailey found the Hero's story was her favorite overall Dragon Quest memory, and she was surprised to find out that, instead of escaping from slavery, the Hero spent 10 years of his early years in captivity. The loss of the Hero's childhood was a large contributor to her having the game as her favorite. Famitsu writer Kawachi felt that the Hero's journey was relatable to a lot of players, with players having to make important choices as young people. Automaton writer Yuzuru Sonohara felt that Sancho's feelings for the Hero mimicked the player's more than any other character's, due to seeing the Hero grow up like Sancho did. Writer Daniel Andreyev noted that, despite not normally finding time travel an interesting element in fiction at the time, he found the time travel scene of the Hero meeting his son a particularly emotional one. RPGFan staff found the decision to make the protagonist not the Legendary Hero, noting how typical it was for the protagonist to be the hero in Japanese role-playing games at the time. He was also regarded as a favorite silent protagonist, and the game was praised for portraying the Hero's life from childhood to parenthood.
