= DW7 =

DW7 may refer to:

- Dragon Warrior VII
- Dynasty Warriors 7
