= ArtePiazza =

Japanese video game developer

ArtePiazza Co., Ltd.
- Type: Private
- Industry: Software & programming, computer graphics, illustration, and logo design
- Founded: November 1, 1989
- Headquarters: Tokyo, Japan
- Key people: Shintaro Majima (CEO, art director); Sachiko Sugimura (planning director, scenario writer)
- Number of employees: 31 (2021)
- Website: www.artepiazza.com

ArtePiazza Co., Ltd. (アルテピアッツァ株式会社, ArutePiattsa Kabushiki-gaisha) is a video game development and computer graphics studio based in Tokyo, Japan. Their name derives from the Italian words for "art" and "plaza" (i.e. a public square).

== History ==
The company is best known for its involvement in the development of the Dragon Quest series by Enix and later Square Enix. While ArtePiazza was mostly responsible for the CG design and illustrations of some of the early titles, they produced enhanced remakes of others. This includes Dragon Quest V: Hand of the Heavenly Bride for the PlayStation 2, Nintendo DS remakes of Dragon Quest IV: Chapters of the Chosen, Dragon Quest V: Hand of the Heavenly Bride, Dragon Quest VI: Realms of Revelation, and the Nintendo Switch remake of Super Mario RPG.

Other projects besides those based on Square Enix properties include the development of the PlayStation Portable and PlayStation 2 game Innocent Life: A Futuristic Harvest Moon and the co-production of Koei's Wii title Opoona.

The CEO of the company is Shintaro Majima. The company's motto is “The analog within the digital”. This means video games are digital entertainment trying to mimic real-life analog things, and the expression itself must be prioritized over digital techniques.

== Games ==
List of games developed by ArtePiazza
Year	Title	Publisher	Platform(s)	Ref.
1996	Dragon Quest III	Enix	Super Nintendo Entertainment System	
2000	Dragon Quest VII	Enix	PlayStation	
2001	Dragon Quest IV	Enix	PlayStation	
2002	Dragon Quest Characters: Torneko no Daibōken 3	Enix	PlayStation 2	
2004	Dragon Quest V	Square Enix	PlayStation 2	
2006	Innocent Life: A Futuristic Harvest Moon	Marvelous Interactive	PlayStation Portable, PlayStation 2	
2007	Opoona	Koei	Wii	
2007	Dragon Quest IV: Chapters of the Chosen	Square Enix	Nintendo DS	
2008	Dragon Quest V: Hand of the Heavenly Bride	Square Enix	Nintendo DS	
2010	GO Series: Pinball Attack!	Gamebridge	DSiWare	
2010	Dragon Quest VI: Realms of Revelation	Square Enix	Nintendo DS	
2010	Accel Knights: Imashi ga Tame Ware wa Tsurugi o Toru	ArtePiazza	DSiWare	
2010	Arrow of Laputa	ArtePiazza	DSiWare	
2011	Rikishi	ArtePiazza	DSiWare	
2013	Dragon Quest VII: Fragments of the Forgotten Past	Square Enix	Nintendo 3DS	
2016	Romancing SaGa 2	Square Enix	Android, iOS, PlayStation Vita, Nintendo Switch, PlayStation 4, Windows, Xbox One	
2017	Dragon Quest Rivals	Square Enix	Android, iOS	
2017	Dragon Quest XI: Echoes of an Elusive Age	Square Enix	Nintendo 3DS	
2019	Dragon Quest XI S: Echoes of an Elusive Age - Definitive Edition	Square Enix	Nintendo Switch, PlayStation 4, Windows, Xbox One, Stadia	
2019	Romancing SaGa 3	Square Enix	Android, iOS, Nintendo Switch, PlayStation 4, PlayStation Vita, Windows, Xbox One	
2023	Super Mario RPG	Nintendo	Nintendo Switch	
2026	Tensei Game: Karma x Cross	Any	Nintendo Switch	
