= Ladja (Dragon Quest) =

Dragon Quest V antagonist

- Dragon Quest character
- Ladja in Dragon Quest V
- First appearance: Dragon Quest V (1992)
- Designed by: Akira Toriyama

Ladja, known as Gema (ゲマ) in Japanese, is a character in the 1992 video game Dragon Quest V. He is one of the primary antagonists, responsible for the death of the Hero's father, Pankraz, and the subsequent enslavement of the Hero. He is the minion of the game's final villain, Grandmaster Nimzo. He was designed by Akira Toriyama and created by Yuji Horii, who aspired to create a villain who spanned multiple generations and who would ultimately be defeated in the end. He also appears in the film Dragon Quest: Your Story as an antagonist, which is based on the story of Dragon Quest V. He has received generally positive reception, with critics noting his superiority as the game's antagonist to his master, Nimzo, as well as noting how sadistically he treats the Hero and his father.

== Concept and creation ==
Ladja was designed by Akira Toriyama and created by Yuji Horii for Dragon Quest V. When creating Dragon Quest V, Horii wanted to make a game that portrayed an enemy that spans three generations, going from being a child to an adult and finally to a parent, with the enemy ultimately defeated in the end. An enemy in the game, the Necromancer, is a recolor of Ladja's character design. Ladja is voiced in the film Dragon Quest: Your Story by Kōtarō Yoshida in Japanese and by Jason Marnocha in English. Yoshida expressed happiness to be in the role as someone who grew up with Dragon Quest and noted that he felt pressure due to the importance of Ladja's role. Yoshida ad-libbed certain scenes, with director Ryuichi Yagi noting it as impressive, particularly a certain scene that ended up being extended because of his ad-libbing.

== Appearances ==
Ladja is one of the main antagonists of Dragon Quest V, the Bishop serving under Grandmaster Nimzo. He is first encountered after the game's Hero and another boy named Prince Harry are caught exploring ruins. When the Hero's father, Pankraz, appears and defeats Ladja's minions. Before he can defeat Ladja, Ladja takes his son hostage. Pankraz gives up, causing Ladja to reduce him to ashes and put the two boys into slavery before destroying the Golden Orb that the Hero held. After the Hero escapes slavery 10 years later, he eventually gets married and has twins. His wife is captured by Ladja's minions due to her Zenithian lineage with the intention of preventing the birth of a Zenithian Hero who could defeat Nimzo. After the defeat of his minion, Ladja appears, and one of his minions turns them into stone to prevent the birth despite the birth having already occurred. In subsequent versions of Dragon Quest V, the petrification scene was changed so that Ladja was responsible instead of his minion. They are both eventually returned to normal thanks to their children finding and curing them, and they eventually confront and kill Ladja.

== Reception ==
Ladja has received generally positive reception, identified by Famitsu writer Kawachi as being among his most memorable Dragon Quest characters. Magmix staff discussed the battles against Ladja, noting how traumatic it was that not only is he impossible to beat, but he mocks the Hero as he defeats him. They also regarded the murder of Pankraz by Ladja as one of the most traumatic moment in the series, further expressing their hatred for Ladja that he prevents the Hero from seeing his kids grow up. They also noted that the remakes created a stronger grudge with players due to his greater involvement in the story and trauma of the Hero. Magmix staff arguing that the cruelty and impact on the Hero's life diminished the impact of the main antagonist, Nimzo. RPGFan writer Keegan Lee felt that Ladja was a superior antagonist to Nimzo, wishing that the game was about defeating Ladja instead. Fellow RPGFan writer Mike Solossi agreed, comparing Nimzo unfavorably to other Dragon Quest villains like Dhoulmagus from Dragon Quest VIII and Psaro from Dragon Quest IV. Solossi noted a chess analogy, with how various minions of Nimzo were named after chess pieces such as Bishop Ladja, but felt that Grandmaster Nimzo fell flat due to a lack of characterization. Futabanet writer Amami noted that his role in the game was one of the most shocking scenes in a Super Famicom game. They regarded him as cowardly, noting how he left a strong impression on players and had more presence than the main villain.

Ladja's role in Dragon Quest: Your Story has received positive reception, with Japanese social media users expressing excitement in response to the casting of Kōtarō Yoshida as Ladja. RPGamer writers Elmon Dean Todd and Matt Masem praised Ladja's appearance in Dragon Quest: Your Story. Todd felt that his English voice actor deserved praise for sounding more "villainous and sinister" than the Japanese actor. He also felt that his visual design was an improvement over the video game's, saying that he looks more "sinister and memorable," with Masem feeling that he stood out among human characters with his visual design. RPGFan writer Alana Hagues similarly praised the English portrayal, saying it made Ladja a "truly terrifying and manipulative figure," though criticizing the film for rushing the final fight against him. Despite not being enthused with the film, The Gamer writer Scott Baird found Marnocha's performance of Ladja among the best parts.
