= Bianca, Nera, and Debora =

Dragon Quest V character

- Dragon Quest characters
- Bianca, Nera, and Debora in the Nintendo DS version of Dragon Quest V
- First game: Dragon Quest V (1992) (Bianca and Nera); Dragon Quest V (2008) (Debora)
- Created by: Yuji Horii
- Designed by: Akira Toriyama

Bianca, Nera, and Debora are three female characters in the video game Dragon Quest V. Where Bianca and Nera were introduced in the 1992 Super Famicom release of the game, Debora was introduced in the 2008 Nintendo DS release. They are all three major characters in the game, with their significance depending on which of the three the protagonist marries. Bianca is the protagonist's childhood friend, while Nera and Debora are sisters whom he becomes acquainted with later in life. Whomever is chosen, the protagonist will marry them before eventually giving birth to two children, with whom they work together to defeat the main antagonist, Grandmaster Nimzo.

The choice between Bianca and Nera has been a debate for decades since Dragon Quest V's release, with critics and fans debating who was the better option. Polls tend to show similar rates of support for one or the other, with Bianca or Nera being number one depending on the poll. Debora, meanwhile, is typically not as popular. Bianca and Nera has received generally positive reception, considered two of the best female Dragon Quest characters.

== Concept and creation ==
Bianca, Nera, and Debora's designs were created for Dragon Quest V by Akira Toriyama. Nera's design was also conceived by Dragon Quest designer Hazuki Kurikara. Bianca was an important character before Nera was; Kurikara was instructed to create a design for her, drawing designs for her over and over again due to nervousness. He created a design he was satisfied with, but he ultimately scrapped it. The design originally had a white dress. Kurikara wanted to help make Nera more distinct from Bianca, giving her blue hair to accomplish this. When discussing Bianca and Nera's popularity, creator Yuji Horii felt that most people would choose Bianca, and was surprised by how many people chose Nera. While the Japanese version of Dragon Quest V gives her a standard Japanese accent, her accent in the English version was changed, suggested by Automaton writer Takumi Nango as being either Cockney English or Australian English. The three have distinct personalities from one another; Bianca's is that of a tomboy, Nera is selfless and polite, and Debora is abrasive and domineering.

When making Bianca's design for the film Dragon Quest: Your Story, the designers aimed to make her more "spunky," aiming to make her stand out and be more than a "pretty girl." They also gave her freckles to reflect this further. They changed her hair to make it more tussled to display her tomboyishness more. Her outfit, which is based on her outfit from Dragon Quest V, made her more armor-like to make her seem more like she could fight monsters. When discussing Bianca's role in the story, Arimura noted that Bianca seemed like she was more ahead on things than the Hero, and thus incorporated that into her performance. Bianca is voiced by Kasumi Arimura, According to the director, Takashi Yamazaki, Arimura was cast because she has an older-sister vibe while being kind, which he felt matched Bianca.

== Appearances ==
Bianca and Nera first appeared in the 1992 release of Dragon Quest V, while Debora only appears in the Nintendo DS release in 2008. Bianca is a little girl when she meets the Hero, a childhood friend of hers, going on an adventure and finding a Sabrecat they name Saber before the Hero is eventually kidnapped. They reunite 10 years later, and Nera are met later in the story. As part of the Hero's quest for an item called the Zenithian Shield, he must take part in a marriage ceremony for Nera's hand, though Nera wishes for the Hero to be able to choose between her and Bianca, believing Bianca has feelings for the Hero. Debora is introduced in the Nintendo DS version, and insists she be an option. Whomever is chosen joins the Hero on his quest to find his mother, ultimately becoming pregnant and giving birth to a boy and girl. The wife is kidnapped due to having Zenithian blood, which would allow their children to become the Legendary Hero. The Hero and his wife are turned to stone when the Hero attempts to save her, with the Hero saved by his children, who eventually saves his wife as well, joining his quest.

Bianca appears alongside Nera in Dragon Quest Heroes: The World Tree's Woe and the Blight Below, where both venture out into the world before the day that the Hero would have normally proposed in Dragon Quest V. Bianca also appears alongside Nera in the mobile game Itadaki Street MOBILE. Bianca also appears as a playable character in Fortune Street.

Bianca and Nera appear in the film adaptation of Dragon Quest V titled Dragon Quest: Your Story.

== Reception ==
The three received generally positive reception, though their level of reception relative to each other vary. Where Bianca and Nera ranked second and first in an IT Media reader poll of female Dragon Quest characters, Debora ranked 14th. Bianca and Nera later swapped places in a 2024 reader poll by IT Media with IT Media writer Niija discussing why they were so popular. They argued that Bianca's appeal comes from her being the hero's childhood friend and their eventual reunion, while Nera's comes from her selflessness and natural side.

Bianca and Nera have been involved in a decades-long debate of who the best wife to choose in Dragon Quest V is, and Bianca and Nera are said by IT Media to have kept Dragon Quest V popular. Magmix staff felt that Nera had more passionate fans, while Bianca had more fans in general, adding that most official novels depict Bianca as the chosen partner. In a poll of IT Media readers, Bianca was ranked as the second best marriage option in Dragon Quest V, above Deborah and below Nera. IT Media writer Dopey noted that fans seemed to choose her based on her being a childhood friend and having a friendly personality. An examination of tweets made by the three fanbases found that Bianca had the most tweets about her, the author also noting that there were fewer negative comments about her than Nera. Tweets often cited her gameplay advantages for why they chose Nera. By comparison to Bianca and Nera, who had 50 and 43 percent of tweets respectively, Debora only had seven percent. Automaton writer Takumi Nango noted that fan response to the three women overseas was about the same as Japanese users, though they said that Bianca's accent in the English version was a turnoff to some. They felt that her accent was given to her to make her more of a tomboy and to differentiate her further from Nera.

Writer Kurt Kalata discussed this rivalry, noting how Bianca was significantly more interesting than the other option, Nera, arguing that the game is still weighted in Bianca's favor despite attempts in the Nintendo DS version to make Nera more appealing. RPGamer writer Erik van Asselt felt similarly, citing her hair and her being the hero's childhood friend, among other traits. Her being the hero's childhood friend was also appealing to RPGamer writer Corey Scoggins. Fellow RPGamer writer Elmon Dean Todd had various reasons for his choice, including her being a childhood friend, hair, personality, and gameplay reasons. However, he also felt that this was the happiest outcome, as Nera would still marry someone if you don't choose her, while Bianca is "single and lonely." Magmix staff interviewed a marriage counselor, who suggested that while men seeking a wife are typically interested in women like Nera, he usually recommends women like Bianca instead. He felt that women like Bianca are strong and able to provide mutual support, while women like Nera walk half a step behind the man. On Debora, he suggested that men who choose women like Debora would only do so by accident.

Final Fantasy XVI director Kazutoyo Maehiro noted that Bianca served as an inspiration for certain elements of Jill Warrick, a character in that game. Character designer D.K. noted that he had difficulty designing the character model for Kainé, causing producer Yosuke Saito, someone who worked on Dragon Quest, to incorporate Bianca's design into Kainé's. GameSpot staff identified the relationship between the hero and Bianca as one of the best video game love stories, calling her the clear choice between the marriage options. Writer Mitsuzu Ogawa discussed how people can take a lesson from Bianca's willingness to sacrifice her happiness for the person she loves, and how people should take a step back and think about who our words benefit. Inside Games staff discussed how experiencing the loneliness of traveling alone, as the hero does, helps make people into Bianca fans, suggesting that players may recount their experiences with her as a child. They also praised the portrayal of Bianca in the Dragon Quest V novelization, feeling that it captured the feeling of a girls' manga. Manga artist Kazuaki Ishida, a regular contributor to the manga collection Dragon Quest 4koma, recounted how he always picked Bianca due to Bianca's early significance in the story and his enjoyment of energetic characters. He noted that some other contributors to Dragon Quest 4koma were Nera fans.

A writer for Den Fami Nico Gamer discussed how all of his friends chose Bianca while he chose Nera for gameplay reasons and attractiveness. In response, his classmates expressed confusion and suggested he lacked empathy for not picking Bianca due to her backstory. Years later, he did a new playthrough where he chooses Bianca instead, which lead him to state that players playing with emotion would choose Bianca. RPGFan writer Mike Solossi felt that the game did not do a good job of setting Nera up as a good choice over Bianca, noting that even with the early scene added in the Nintendo DS version depicting Nera, he felt that Bianca's story role outweighed Nera's. Fellow RPGFan writer Robert Steinman similarly felt disincentivized from choosing Nera, specifically due to her already having someone she wanted to marry. Futabanet writer Luis Field discussed how some players felt similarly to Steinman. Futabanet writer Yamaguchi Quest felt that the popularity of Nera increased over time; he discussed how he always went with Bianca. He felt that a large draw for Nera fans were t he gameplay benefits, believing that players may have chosen her because they thought they would not get the shield if they married Bianca.

When discussing Debora's personality, Luis Field felt that it contributed to Debora being considerably less popular than Bianca and Nera. Gizmodo writer Naoki Tsukamoto praised Debora's beauty, arguing that she was the best wife and mother and suggesting that people choose her as a wife if they haven't before. RPGFan Keegan Lee stated that he was a "solid Debora supporter," feeling that despite her being less popular, he enjoyed watching her change over time as the story progresses.
