= Arrow of Laputa =

2010 video game

- Developer(s): ArtePiazza
- Publisher(s): ArtePiazza
- Composer(s): Hayato Matsuo
- Platform(s): Nintendo DSi
- Release: JP: November 24, 2010
- Genre(s): Tower defense
- Mode(s): Single-player

Arrow of Laputa (アロー・オブ・ラピュタ, Arō obu Rapyuta) is a tower defense game developed and published by ArtePiazza in Japan on November 24, 2010 for the Nintendo DSi.
