= Heartbeat (company) =

Japanese video game developer

Heart Beat Inc.
- Native name: 株式会社ハートビート
- Romanized name: Kabushiki-gaisha Hāto Bīto
- Company type: Private
- Industry: Video games
- Founded: October 1992
- Founder: Manabu Yamana
- Defunct: 2002
- Headquarters: Chūō, Tokyo, Japan
- Website: https://www.heartbeat.co.jp/

Heart Beat Inc. (株式会社ハートビート, Kabushiki-gaisha Hāto Bīto) (sometimes Heartbeat) was a Japanese video game developer, famous for developing the sixth and seventh installments of the Dragon Quest series. Heartbeat also developed a remake of Dragon Quest IV. Plans to localize this remake in North America were halted when the employees of Heartbeat decided to take a sabbatical in January 2002. The company stated its reason was "the raise of development costs", despite the massive financial success of its games. Several of its former members created Genius Sonority. The company now appears defunct.

== Games ==
=== Super NES ===
- Dragon Quest VI
- Dragon Quest III (remake)

=== PlayStation ===
- Dragon Quest VII
- Dragon Quest IV (remake)
