= Dragon Quest XI =

2017 video game

Dragon Quest XI: Echoes of an Elusive Age
- Developer: Square Enix (Note: Additional development support by Orca. The 3DS version had assistance by Toylogic. 2D mode developed by ArtePiazza.)
- Publisher: Square Enix (Note: Nintendo published the Nintendo Switch version outside of Japan until February 2025.)
- Director: Takeshi Uchikawa
- Producers: Yosuke Saito; Hokuto Okamoto
- Designer: Yuji Horii
- Programmer: Toshihide Kitamura
- Artists: Akira Toriyama; Eiichiro Nakatsu
- Writers: Yuji Horii; Kenjirou Mori; Jun Ito
- Composer: Koichi Sugiyama
- Series: Dragon Quest
- Engine: Unreal Engine 4
- Platforms: Nintendo 3DS; PlayStation 4; Windows; Nintendo Switch; Nintendo Switch 2; Xbox One; Stadia
- Release: July 29, 2017: Nintendo 3DS; JP: July 29, 2017 PlayStation 4; JP: July 29, 2017; WW: September 4, 2018 Windows; WW: September 4, 2018 Definitive Edition Switch; WW: September 27, 2019 PS4, Windows, Xbox One; WW: December 4, 2020 Stadia; WW: March 16, 2021 Switch 2; WW: September 24, 2026
- Genre: Role-playing
- Mode: Single-player

Dragon Quest XI: Echoes of an Elusive Age (Note: Known in Japan as Dragon Quest XI: Sugisarishi Toki o Motomete, lit. "Dragon Quest XI: In Search of Lost Time" (ドラゴンクエストXI 過ぎ去りし時を求めて).) is a 2017 role-playing video game developed and published by Square Enix. The eleventh entry in the Dragon Quest series, it was released in Japan for the Nintendo 3DS and PlayStation 4 in July 2017 and worldwide for the PlayStation 4 and Windows in September 2018. An enhanced version, Dragon Quest XI S: Echoes of an Elusive Age – Definitive Edition, (Note: Dragon Quest XI: Sugisarishi Toki o Motomete S (ドラゴンクエストXI 過ぎ去りし時を求めて S) in Japanese) was released for the Nintendo Switch in September 2019; for PlayStation 4, Windows, and Xbox One in December 2020, for Stadia in March 2021 and for Nintendo Switch 2 in September 2026. Taking place in a world called Erdrea, the game follows the hero's quest to save the world from an impending disaster. Throughout the game, he explores challenges related to his prophesied Luminary identity as he endures persecution from those who demonize him.

One of the first games announced for the Switch, the game was originally conceived to be fully open world; however, the idea was scrapped when it conflicted with the story the developers wanted to tell. To increase the awareness of the Dragon Quest franchise in the West, support for Windows and features such as voiced English dialogue and 4K resolution were included. Elements added later included an expanded plot and an option to listen to an orchestral version of the score.

Upon release, the game received critical acclaim for its story, characters, narrative, and localization, though its design was criticized for being overly traditional. The game has shipped over 9 million copies as of September 2025. The Luminary has also been featured in crossover media such as Super Smash Bros. Ultimate.

== Gameplay ==
In-game screenshot showing a battle against a dragon

The Nintendo 3DS and Definitive Edition versions have an optional mode that allows the player to play them similar to older Dragon Quest games.

Dragon Quest XI continues the gameplay of previous games in the series, in which the player explores worlds and fights against various monsters, including the ability to explore high areas. The Nintendo 3DS version features a different style to the other versions, showcasing 3D graphics on the top screen and 16-bit styled sprites on the bottom screen. Outside of battle, the player can freely toggle between the 3D and 2D graphical styles. Like with Dragon Quest IX, on land, the game's battle system features no random encounters and shows all enemies on the overworld. The battle system also adds a free-form camera option inspired by the MMORPG Dragon Quest X that allows the player to move around the enclosed battlefield, although it is purely visual and provides no other benefits to gameplay.

== Plot ==
The game is set in the world of Erdrea and begins as the kingdom of Dundrasil is invaded and destroyed by an army of monsters. The protagonist, an infant during the attack, survives and is found floating down a river by an old man named Chalky in the village of Cobblestone. The protagonist is adopted by Chalky's daughter Amber and raised in the village. After the protagonist's coming-of-age ceremony, Amber reveals the truth to him about his birth and adoption and sends him to meet King Carnelian of Heliodor. However, the king accuses him of being an evil entity and throws him into the dungeons.

Imprisoned, the protagonist meets a thief named Erik, who reveals that he was sent to meet him, as the mark on his hand is proof that he is the Luminary, a legendary hero chosen by the world tree Yggdrasil to save Erdrea from evil. The pair escape and evade capture, later joined by two mages: Veronica, who is trapped in a child's body due to a curse, and her twin sister, Serena. On their quest to help the Luminary reach Yggdrasil, they gain three other companions: Sylvando, a traveling entertainer, Jade, the exiled princess of Heliodor who helped the infant protagonist escape during the attack on Dundrasil, and Rab, the former king of Dundrasil and the protagonist's grandfather.

The party eventually arrives at the heart of Yggdrasil, which contains the Sword of Light, the Luminary's destined weapon. However, just as the Luminary is about to take it, he and the party are intercepted by Carnelian and his retainers Jasper and Hendrik. It is revealed that Carnelian was possessed by an evil sorcerer known as Mordegon, who was also responsible for Dundrasil's destruction, and Jasper is Mordegon's agent. The two subdue Hendrik and the Luminary's party, with Mordegon stealing the Luminary's power and the Sword of Light, corrupting it into the Sword of Shadows in the process, and absorbing the heart of Yggdrasil, destroying the tree and plunging the world into an age of darkness.

Separated from the others, the Luminary returns to Cobblestone, turned into a fortified refuge for Heliodor citizens led by Carnelian and Hendrik, who apologize to the Luminary for all the troubles they caused him. Hendrik joins forces with the Luminary, and together they reclaim Heliodor from Mordegon's forces. At one point, a dark spirit summons a mysterious orb called Erdwin's Lantern. However, Mordegon destroys it so no one stands in his way. After reuniting with the rest of the party, except for Veronica, who perished saving the others during the fall of Yggdrasil, and reclaiming the Luminary's power, the Luminary obtains the means to forge a new Sword of Light, which they use to defeat Jasper and Mordegon, restoring Yggdrasil and the world.

Afterwards, the party discovers the means to bring Veronica (and other people who perished) back within the Tower of Lost Time. There, they meet the Timekeeper, who gives the Luminary the power to go back in time and defeat Mordegon before he can steal the Sword of Light and Yggdrasil's heart, thus saving Veronica from sacrificing herself and preventing Mordegon's dark age. However, due to Mordegon's absence, Erdwin's Lantern was not destroyed, thus the dark spirit is able to merge with it and awaken as the Dark One, Calasmos. The party learns that a prior Luminary named Erdwin was betrayed and killed by his mage companion Morcant, who absorbed Calasmos' powers and transformed into Mordegon. Since he could not be destroyed forever without the power of the Luminary, Serenica, Erdwin's former sage companion and lover, then sealed the weakened Calasmos within Erdwin's Lantern and attempted to return to the past at the Tower of Lost Time, but was turned into the Timekeeper instead.

The party then confronts and destroys Calasmos, before the Luminary entrusts his mark to Serenica, who reverts to her original form and uses it to return to the past and reunite with Erdwin. Accompanied by Veronica and Serena, he also returns the Sword of Light to Yggdrasil, who reveals itself to be Yggdragon, an ancient dragon of light who was defeated by Calasmos ages ago, whose body transformed into the tree Yggdrasil and gave life to Erdrea. Yggdragon bestows upon the Luminary the title of "Erdrick", the mightiest of all heroes, and keeps the Sword for the day when a new hero will need it to defend Erdrea from evil.

In the credits, Serenica reunites with Erdwin in the past. Afterwards, a young mother, following reading the Luminary's story in a book, wakes up her child from bed, setting up the beginning of Dragon Quest III.

== Characters ==
- Protagonist: The protagonist of the game is a 16-year-old boy from Cobblestone. As a baby, he was discovered along the river and raised in the village. He is the prince of the fallen kingdom of Dundrasil as well as the Luminary, a reincarnation of Erdwin, the ancient hero of Erdrea. He can use one-handed swords and shields or greatswords in battle.
- Erik: A young thief who befriends the protagonist. He was enslaved by the Vikings of Sniflheim before his sister was cursed and turned to gold. He can use daggers, swords, and boomerangs.
- Veronica: A bossy mage from Arboria who was transformed into a child. She and her twin sister, Serena, were tasked with protecting the Luminary. She wields offensive magic and can use heavy wands and whips.
- Serena: Veronica’s twin sister. She looks older and is more polite than Veronica. She wields healing and defensive magic, and can use wands, shields, and spears.
- Sylvando: A flamboyant travelling entertainer who was raised to be a knight by his father Don Rodrigo, the leader of Puerto Valor. He wields support magic and can use whips, knives, and swords.
- Jade: The princess of Heliodor and expert in martial arts. She has a sibling relationship with the protagonist. She can use spears and claws, and also relies on her sex appeal to charm enemies.
- Rab: The former king of Dundrasil and the protagonist’s grandfather. After the fall of Dundrasil, he trained Jade. As a sage, he wields offensive and healing magic and can use heavy wands and claws.
- Hendrik: One of King Carnelian’s loyal knights who is tasked with hunting down the Luminary. He is initially convinced the protagonist is the Darkspawn. He can use greatswords, swords and shields, and axes.

== Development and release ==
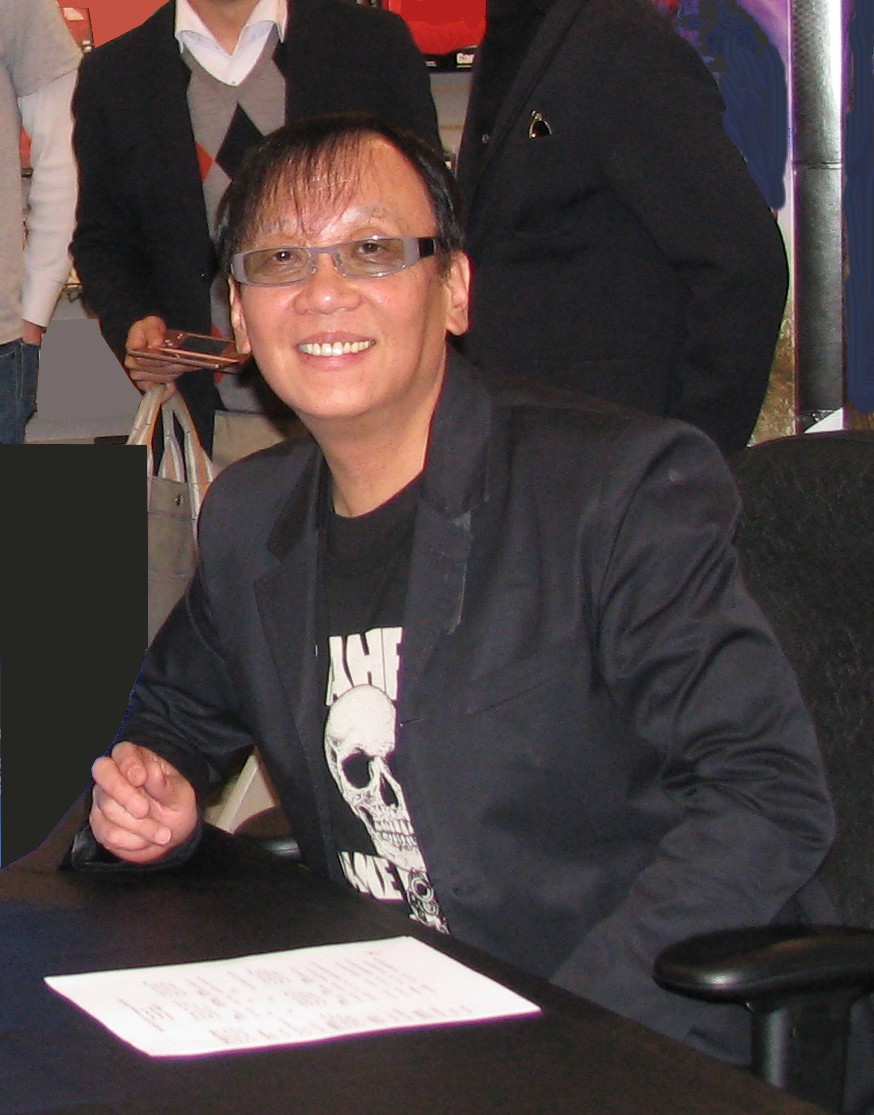
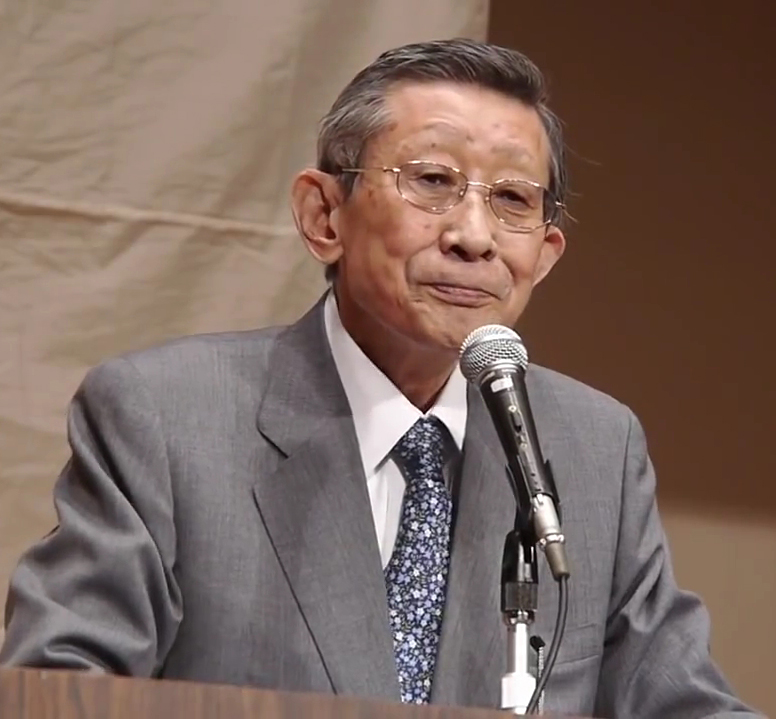
As with most of the series, Dragon Quest XI was designed and written by Yuji Horii and scored by Koichi Sugiyama.

Dragon Quest XI started development in 2013, with it being announced in 2015 for the PlayStation 4, Nintendo 3DS, and Nintendo Switch. It was one of the first games announced for the Nintendo Switch, which was known under the codename of Nintendo NX as it had not been fully revealed at the time. Initially, the team considered making the game fully open world, but decided against it as it would have led to issues telling its story. The PlayStation 4, Windows, and Switch versions use the Unreal Engine 4 game engine and had developmental assistance from ORCA Inc, while the 3DS version had assistance from Toylogic Inc. The 16-bit 2D graphical mode that was present in the Nintendo 3DS version and Definitive Edition was developed by ArtePiazza.

In April 2017, Square Enix held a special presentation for the game, where the release date for the PlayStation 4 and 3DS versions of the game in Japan was revealed to be July 29, 2017. The same month, Sony Interactive Entertainment and Nintendo unveiled special editions of their PlayStation 4 Slim and New Nintendo 2DS XL hardware for Japan to tie into the game. Coinciding with the release, lead designer and scenario writer Yuji Horii announced that an international version, localized in five separate languages, would be released in 2018. The exact date was later revealed to be September 4, 2018, along with a version for Windows via Steam, a first for the main series. It includes voiced English dialogue, a first-person camera option, support for 4K resolution, and a set of harder "Draconian Quest" difficulty modifiers, among other minor changes. Square Enix stated they wanted to expand the Dragon Quest brand outside of Japan, which they believed that these features, in addition to having a Windows version, would assist it.

The international PlayStation 4 release also saw a special collector's edition, titled Edition of Lost Time, which includes the base game, a set of bonus in-game items, a 128-page hardback art book featuring original character design concepts from Akira Toriyama, a two-disc soundtrack featuring orchestrated versions of the game's music by Koichi Sugiyama, a cloth map of the game's world, and a steelbook case. The 3DS version was not localized outside of Japan, and the Switch version was delayed while the team updated it to a newer version of Unreal Engine 4 that the system supports. The Switch version was re-announced at Tokyo Game Show 2018. Known as Dragon Quest XI S: Echoes of an Elusive Age - Definitive Edition, it was released worldwide on September 27, 2019, and features English and Japanese voice acting, with the English voice acting being available as an add-on in the Japanese Switch version, an expanded version of the 2D mode from the 3DS version, an option for orchestral music (with "Overture XI", a version of the series' main theme, from the game's opening movie, being re-orchestrated, which was taken from the orchestrated soundtrack, as with the other tracks in the game), quality-of-life improvements such as a new "ultra-fast" battle speed and more streamlined item forging, a photo mode, and expanded plot elements. Dragon Quest XI S was also released for PlayStation 4, Windows, and Xbox One on December 4, 2020, while a Stadia version was released on March 16, 2021. During the Dragon Quest 40th anniversary event, Square Enix announced that a Nintendo Switch 2 version of the game will be released on September 24, 2026.

== Reception ==
Reception

Aggregate scores
Aggregator	Score
Metacritic	PS4: 86/100; PC: 80/100; NS: 91/100; PS4 (S): 91/100; XONE: 92/100
OpenCritic	99% recommend

Review scores
Publication	Score
Destructoid	8/10
Electronic Gaming Monthly	8.5/10
Famitsu	10/10, 10/10, 10/10, 10/10
Game Informer	8.25/10
GameRevolution	4.5/5
GameSpot	9/10
IGN	8.8/10
PC Gamer (UK)	68/100
USgamer	5/5

Dragon Quest XI received "generally favourable reviews" according to review aggregator Metacritic, with critics praising it for its visuals, traditional turn-based combat, plot, and characters. The expanded re-release (XI S) received "universal acclaim" according to Metacritic. Multiple publications called it the best game in the Dragon Quest series, as well as one of the best contemporary JRPGs. Kotaku's Tim Rogers, a long-time player of the series, called it one of the best games of all time. USgamer considered the game to be the natural followup to Dragon Quest VIII, the last main-series console game to be released outside of Japan, and an ideal entry point for newcomers to the series. PC Gamer praised the English localization, calling it "the most brilliant, underappreciated writing of the year."

Despite the common praise, some critics regarded the conservative approach to the game as a detriment. Polygon stated that the upgraded visuals and presentation were "grafted onto a frail and aging skeleton" and that it was unlikely to bring in any new fans to the series due to its non-evolving nature. PC Gamer agreed, noting that while the Windows port ran without issue and "looked great," they believed the game itself was "disappointingly safe." IGN criticized some sexualized elements in the game, including a quest to dress up a female character in a bunny outfit, as well as the series' usual "puff puff" content. Some critics also wrote that the game's non-orchestrated, MIDI-synthesized soundtrack was often at odds with the game's visuals. For the Windows version, fans released a mod that replaced it with existing orchestral recordings. An orchestral soundtrack was later included in the Definitive Edition, although the original soundtrack was also available.

=== Sales ===
The game sold over two million physical copies on its first two days of sale in Japan; the Nintendo 3DS version sold 1.13 million, while the PlayStation 4 version sold 0.95 million. In North America, the game had the best launch month in series history, doubling the dollar sales of the previous best, Dragon Quest IX. By November 2018, it had shipped over four million copies worldwide. Dragon Quest XI S sold 303,204 physical copies in its first week in Japan in its Switch version. The 3DS, PS4, and Switch versions sold a total of 5,800,000 units in Japan. By December 2024, the game had shipped over seven million copies worldwide. By September 2025 total shippments had increased to over 9 million units globally.

=== Awards ===
Year	Award	Category	Result	Ref.
2018	Game Critics Awards	Best RPG	Nominated	
2018	Golden Joystick Awards	PlayStation Game of the Year	Nominated	
2018	Golden Joystick Awards	Ultimate Game of the Year	Nominated	
2018	The Game Awards 2018	Best Role-Playing Game	Nominated	
2018	Gamers' Choice Awards	Fan Favorite Role Playing Game	Nominated	
2019	22nd Annual D.I.C.E. Awards	Role-Playing Game of the Year	Nominated	

== Legacy ==
The Luminary appeared as a playable character via downloadable content in the 2018 crossover fighting game Super Smash Bros. Ultimate. Yggdrasil's Altar is his stage and comes with several music tracks from the series. The character's alternate costumes are the heroes from Dragon Quest III, Dragon Quest IV, and Dragon Quest VIII. A Luminary Amiibo was released in 2020.

A prequel to Dragon Quest XI starring Erik and Mia, Dragon Quest Treasures, was released in 2022. The Dragon Quest VII: Reimagined Luminary Livery DLC set adds costumes based on the party from Dragon Quest XI.
