= Opoona =

2007 video game developed by ArtePiazza

- North American box art
- Developer: ArtePiazza
- Publisher: Koei
- Director: Sachiko Sugimura
- Producer: Hisashi Koinuma
- Artist: Shintaro Majima
- Writer: Sachiko Sugimura
- Composers: Hitoshi Sakimoto; Noriyuki Kamikura; Masaharu Iwata; Mitsuhiro Kaneda; Kimihiro Abe; Manabu Namiki
- Platform: Wii
- Release: JP: November 1, 2007; NA: March 25, 2008; EU: September 12, 2008; AU: September 25, 2008
- Genre: Role-playing
- Mode: Single-player

Opoona (オプーナ, Opūna) is a role-playing video game developed by ArtePiazza and published by Koei for the Wii. The player follows the story of the titular Opoona as he attempts to find the location of his family from which he was separated after the occurrence of a mysterious accident during their travels. Former Dragon Quest art designer Shintaro Majima was the lead artist, with Sachiko Sugimura, who has also worked on Dragon Quest, as the planning director. Hitoshi Sakimoto, best known for composing Final Fantasy XII, produced the soundtrack, which was composed by him and his Basiscape musicians.

== Gameplay ==
Throughout the game, Opoona will acquire a variety of licences for different jobs. Whilst some are mandatory for story progression, most are optional and add to the customization of the players game. The game can be played one-handed using just the Wii's Nunchuk attachment, but the Classic Controller can also be used. In battles, flicking the Nunchuk's analog stick will fire a projectile, the trajectory of which can be changed and adjusted according to the situation. The style of play is referred to in-game as the "Active Bon-Bon Battle System" and all actions occur in real time.

== Setting ==
Before the events of Opoona, the planet Landroll was impacted by a large meteorite composed of crystallized dark energy. Half of the star, once lush and verdant, died from the impact, becoming the Deadlands. Life for the survivors changed drastically; the impact caused a shift in gravity, causing the sun to become tidally locked to the planet. Species died and vegetation withered in the heat; mysterious creatures, known as Rogues, emerged from the meteorite and began to attack people. Humans eventually built sturdy glass domes over Landroll's surviving cities. Sanctuary, an island floating above the northern pole, was unaffected and habitable areas outside the domes became the wild lands.

== Plot ==
Several hundred years after the meteorite impact, Opoona and his siblings, Copoona and Poleena, are on a family vacation from the star Tizia with their parents, Momeena, Dadeena and co-pilots Troc and Noix, travelling in a spaceship to Landroll. Momeena tells Opoona that her brother, Roidman, lives on the planet doing research on how to reduce the Rogue population. Shortly after, the spaceship is attacked by mysterious dark energy, and the three children are placed into separate escape pods before the spaceship crashes on Landroll.

Opoona awakens from a coma in Tokione Dome and is informed of the incident, and told that his parents are being treated by Sages in Sanctuary. He is then introduced to Aizal, the Head Sage, who tells Opoona it will take some time for them to recover due to a shortage of Matia. Opoona is enrolled at Starhouse school and is trained as a Landroll Ranger with help from Chaika, a young Ranger girl, and Commander Goldy, a high-ranking Landroll Ranger; at Starhouse, Opoona is reunited with his brother, Copoona, who has no idea where his sister's escape pod could be. Days after the spaceship incident, Poleena's escape pod is discovered in the wildlands. An elderly woman, Creola, recommends to Goldy that it would be best to care for Poleena herself, and to not inform Aizel.

Once enrolled in Starhouse, Opoona is asked to investigate matters at the Wind Ravine as part of his training. Opoona finds that the source of the activity in the Ravine is his own escape pod, which still emanates some dark energy from the spaceship. Opoona graduates from Starhouse as a Level One Ranger, receiving assignments in Lifeborn, Artiela and the Intelligent Sea, where he is temporarily employed by both the Bravo and Shine companies to remove bugs from programming and to also help patients in the hospital ward.

One of the patients identifies himself as Chaika's father, and Opoona later encounters Chaika herself. Chaika, an experienced engineer, checks Opoona's database file from the spaceship. She reveals that the attack was sent by Shagla, Aizel's younger twin brother who mysteriously disappeared years before. Chaika believes something is amiss, since a fleet large enough to be capable of destroying a spaceship has not been commissioned for several years.

Opoona is now allowed retirement at a residential dome called Paradiso, and attends an official ceremony at Sanctuary. The party arrive at Sanctuary and meet Aizal in the Cathedral, who unleashes an extremely powerful spell at the both of them, stripping them of both their powers and memories.

Poleena remains unconscious until sometime after the Sanctuary incident; Creola asks Poleena to bring her two older siblings to her. She is given a record of all of Opoona's assignment accomplishments and travels through the Holy Lands, which is now infested with Rogues. Upon arriving at Paradiso, Poleena encounters Copoona, who is reluctant to leave, believing there is nothing more for them to do; Poleena then takes Opoona and Copoona back to Creola's hut, where they recover their powers and memories.

Creola asks the both of them to recover her son Shagla from the Earth Prison, who has been falsely imprisoned for years. Creola also proves that the attack on the spaceship was not ordered by Shagla, but rather by Aizel's commandant Babushca. After rescuing Shagla from the prison, Creola reveals a passageway in her hut to an underground base for the Partizians. They are reunited with Roidman and he explains that the only way to save Landroll is to defeat Babuscha, and that Opoona must recruit Partizans to aid him. The Partizans are recruited and together, Opoona and the others defeat Aizal and Babuscha.

=== Characters ===
- Opoona - the protagonist from the planet Tizia, he has an orange Energy Bon-Bon above his head that he can use as a projectile. He starts off in Tokione dome, where he is enlisted to join the Landroll rangers. Outside of the game, Opoona appeared as one of the playable characters in the 2017 crossover game Warriors All-Stars.
- Poleena - Opoona's younger sister, she has two yellow Energy Bon-Bons above her head that resemble pigtails. Her escape pod crashes on the Orcalphin coast, where she is rescued by Aizel's mother.
- Copoona - Opoona's younger brother, his Energy Bon-Bon takes the place of his legs and is purple. He becomes a sage, who is accompanied in the beginning by Sage Sarit, one of Landroll's most respected elders.

== Development ==
Opoona was developed by ArtePiazza, a Japanese game company responsible for creating and porting games in the Dragon Quest series for Enix. Artepiazza was asked by publisher Koei "to create fun and unique visuals that convey the enjoyment of an RPG in a simple fashion" in place of using state-of-the-art CG and hardware technology available at the time of the game's production. Rather than utilize the traditional "single hero" or "chosen one" motif of RPGS, the staff members at Artepiazza emphasized the importance of relationships and family in Opoona, with Sachiko Sugimura explaining that every single person means something and that the world grows and changes in accordance with the loving relationships among all people, instead of depicting the main character only as a special existence. Artepiazza wanted Opoona to appeal to family members of all ages instead of just children. The team designed the game so that it may be played with the Wii Remote Nunchuk attachment alone because of its limited control input that allows the player to casually play the game one-handed while relaxing or eating. The developers initially wanted to exclude any other control options, but decided to allow users to use the Remote or Classic Controller if they prefer.

Art director Shintaro Majima stated that he was first inspired to create Opoona after waking from a nap, taking a bath, and drawing his first design on the bathroom mirror. The main characters were meant to be simple enough that they could be easily redrawn by children; enemies were designed as non-living objects to make them distinct. Majima's personal interest in modern architecture and industrial design were the driving force behind the visual style of Opoona and that the Wii's "clean" and "something new" style overlapped the game's image. Majima's brother Tatsuo, a modern artist, planned the locations and landscapes using what he considered to be the most attractive blend of reality and imagination. The musical score for Opoona was composed by Hitoshi Sakimoto and five fellow members of his Basiscape sound company. Sakimoto arranged the score in an orthodox manner with "futuristic" sounds as he had done with many of his past compositions by combining orchestral music with a synthesizer, but his work on Opoona involved composing the songs through the characters' perspective to somehow lend the player their sympathy. The official soundtrack to Opoona was published over three years after the game's original Japanese launch.

ArtePiazza began working on Opoona in the spring and summer of 2005. The project had no publisher until Dragon Quest designer Yuji Horii sparked talks between ArtePiazza and Koei following the Electronic Entertainment Expo in 2006. Majima came up with the game's title and the main protagonist's name. By using an Energy Bon-Bon projectile as the letter "o" the title, the spelled out "Opoona" was meant to resemble a child firing an Energy Bon-Bon rapidly. The three "o's" in the title was also meant to match Opoona's round shape. Opoona was announced as an untitled RPG in a September 2006 issue of Japanese magazine Famitsu and was unveiled with its finalized title at a Koei press event the following March. Opoona was released in Japan on November 1, 2007 and in North America on March 25, 2008. The game was planned for release in Europe on July 25, 2008, but was delayed until September of that year.

== Reception ==
Reception

Aggregate score
Aggregator	Score
Metacritic	65/100

Review scores
Publication	Score
Destructoid	7.5/10
Edge	7/10
Eurogamer	6/10
Famitsu	31/40
Game Informer	5.5/10
GamePro	3/5
GameRevolution	C−
GameSpot	6.5/10
GameSpy	3.5/5
GameTrailers	6.9/10
GameZone	8/10
IGN	6.8/10
Nintendo Life	7/10
Nintendo Power	7/10
411Mania	1.5/10

Opoona suffered low sales upon its release in Japan. The game was released on the same day as Nintendo's Super Mario Galaxy, a title that Artepiazza and Koei did not foresee as competition being in a different genre. Opoona received a positive review from Japanese magazine Famitsu, which gave it a score of three eights and one seven for a total of 31 out of 40. The publication credited the characterisation, length, music, and difficulty level. Elsewhere, Opoona received "mixed" reviews according to the review aggregation website Metacritic. Eurogamer praised the control system, pace and presentation, and said "it's charming, strange and often fun, but too shallow and stretched out".
