= Sylvando =

Fictional character in Dragon Quest XI

Sylvando Norberto
- Dragon Quest character
- Sylvando as he appears in Dragon Quest XI (2017)
- First game: Dragon Quest XI (2017)
- Created by: Yuji Horii
- Designed by: Akira Toriyama
- Voiced by: EN: Shai Matheson; JP: Masaya Onosaka

In-universe information
- Origin: Puerto Valor

Sylvando, known in Japan as Silvia (Japanese: シルビア, Hepburn: Shirubia), is a fictional character from Square Enix's role-playing video game Dragon Quest XI. Sylvando first appears in the 2017 video game Dragon Quest XI: Echoes of an Elusive Age as a companion of its protagonist, the Luminary. A flamboyant and optimistic itinerant entertainer, Sylvando meets the Luminary in the kingdom of Gallopolis (Note: Samadhi Kingdom (サマディ) in the Japanese version.) and joins his party on their journey to reach the World Tree Yggdrasil after discovering that the Luminary's destiny to fight evil aligns with his dreams of bringing happiness all over the world with his performances. An additional story scenario featured in Dragon Quest XI S: Echoes of an Elusive Age - Definitive Edition follows the character's exploits after the party suffers a major setback when they reached Yggdrasil. A later plot development reveals that Sylvando's true identity is Norberto (Goliath in Japan), the estranged son of Don Rodrigo, the chivalrous leader of the coastal city of Puerto Valor. (Note: Saltico (ソルティコの町) in the Japanese version.)

Sylvando is voiced by Shai Matheson in English, and Masaya Onosaka in Japanese. Matheson was given creative freedom to interpret the character's speech during recording sessions, as the original Japanese version lacked voice acting. Sylvando's personality is intended to be a mixture of masculine and feminine traits, which remained unchanged during the development period of Dragon Quest XI. As the developers intended for Sylvando to be portrayed as a fully realized character, Matheson worked with the localization team to ensure his effeminate mannerisms are handled appropriately without an undue emphasis on common LGBT stereotypes.

Sylvando has received a mostly positive reception. Critics and players alike have praised Sylvando for his gameplay utility as well as his personality, with some commentators citing Sylvando as their favorite character from the game, and as a good example of a heroic LGBT character in fictional media despite not being explicitly confirmed as LGBT in any of his appearances.

== Concept and design ==
Sylvando was conceived as a character who has both masculine and feminine qualities: the former is represented by his chivalry, while his attentiveness and caring nature represents the latter. Series creator and designer Yuji Horii described him as "a character that comes with all the good characteristics associated with both men and women". Director Takeshi Uchikawa noted that unlike the Luminary's other companions, Sylvando is the only character who has no connection to the Luminary or is destined to travel with him, but rather a character who simply cross paths with the party and joins them out of his own volition. On a personal note, Uchikawa said that he could empathize with Sylvando more than others, as the motivation behind his journey is to simply make his dream come true; in that sense, his sense of joy syncs with the sentiment of the game's developers and that they were able to reach the completion of the project with that feeling intact.

The developers remarked that Sylvando's visual appearance, along with his personality, remained unchanged throughout the entirety of the game's development. Producer Hokuto Okamoto remarked that the development team did not want him to be misinterpreted, and took extra care in developing him as he was a tough character to get right.

=== Portrayal ===
Sylvando is voiced by Shai Matheson in English, and by Masaya Onosaka in Japanese. The original Japanese release for Dragon Quest XI did not have voice acting, but it was implemented for the game's international releases in 2018. Japanese voice acting was included for the game's subsequent edition, Dragon Quest XI S, released in 2019. When asked about their decision to implement voice acting for the Western release of Dragon Quest XI, Horii explained that "various emotions, personalities, and characteristics can be communicated through text alone" in Japanese, whereas a character's personality is often best expressed with the way they speak or the tone of their voice in other languages.

A role he auditioned for through his agent, Matheson was under the impression that Sylvando was a fun “long shot” as he had also auditioned for the Prince Faris character, which was a part he believed he would more likely get. For the audition, he came up with an accent based on the picture of the character he was given, and from the impression he had of his name and his profession as a performer. His efforts was well received and he was eventually given the part. Matheson said Sylvando is his biggest video game role to date, as well as the most “over the top” character he has ever played. He noted that "as an actor, there was some extra work in maintaining a consistent accent and tone, finding light and shade". Matheson thought of Sylvando as a charismatic, confident, and resilient jack-of-all-trades who chooses how to define himself rather than be defined by how others see him. Despite the game's fantasy setting, he emphasized that it was important for him to ground Sylvando in reality as opposed to playing him like a caricature or stereotype. Matheson highlighted the more heartfelt or quieter moments where he talks about his feelings or his father, which in his view is a good challenge to show the contrast in his character and balance his flamboyant moments.

Matheson described the recording process to be a collaborative team effort, with most sessions involving a performance writer, a writer, and another staff member based in Japan whom they communicated with via Skype. Matheson noted that he was given a large amount of creative freedom by the team to explore different aspects of Sylvando's personality, such as his tendency to imitate others or making "unusual" sounds when recording procedural audio for combat segments. As he is different in tone compared to the other party members, the team worked to ensure that Sylvando's overall portrayal is defined by his heart as opposed to his mannerisms, his exuberance comes from a place of confidence in his abilities and characteristics, and being unafraid to be who he wants to be. As Dragon Quest XI S contained new material such as expanded character scenarios for each of the party members, Matheson was asked to return to the studio to record additional voice lines for Sylvando.

== Appearances ==
Sylvando is first seen as a circus showman in Gallopolis, a desert kingdom situated in the southern regions of the world of Dragon Quest XI, who will go to any length to entertain his audience. He is depicted as a character who knows more than he lets on; even though he is presented as a performer and jester, he is also familiar with the Knight's Code. He later participates in a horse race where he becomes acquainted with the Luminary, who acted as a substitute for Gallopolis' Prince Faris in return for a favor from the prince, and is aware that he is not the prince. He later assists the Luminary's party with taking down the Slayer of the Sands, a monster threatening the peace of the region around Gallopolis, and purposely binds it in such a way that the prince has to reveal himself later in the city where Sylvando lands the killing blow. When Sylvando discovers that the Luminary's goal is to defeat a mighty enemy who threatens the world, he insists on joining the Luminary's party, offering the use of his ship, the Salty Stallion, in the nearby port city of Gondolia (Note: Daharune (ダーハルーネの町) in the Japanese version.) and leaves behind his beloved horse Margarita in Gallopolis.

When the party arrives in Puerto Valor, Sylvando would constantly make excuses for his absence from the party, though he is eventually spotted and recognized by Servantes as the Salty Stallion sail through a canal he unlocked for the Luminary's party to access. Sylvando is later separated from the Luminary after Yggdrasil's power is consumed by Mordegon and cast down onto the world; when the Luminary encounters Sylvando next, he is revealed to be the leader of a group of men dressed in colourful outfits which he dubbed the "Soldiers of Smile". Following the conclusion of a story arc where the party rescues the father of a local boy in Phnom Nohn, (Note: Pucharao (プチャラオ村) in the Japanese version.) Sylvando leads the party and his Soldiers of Smile troupe to Puerto Valor, where he reveals that he is Don Rodrigo's son Norberto. Sylvando reveals that he was raised to follow his father's footsteps as a knight, but eventually decided that he wanted to be an entertainer instead after being impressed by a circus troupe who arrived in Puerto Valor one day. Following a heated disagreement with Don Rodrigo, he left Puerto Valor to travel the world in pursuit of his passion as an itinerant performer. Both father and son experience reconciliation following their reunion, though Rodriogo is disappointed that Sylvando has yet to achieve his own goals of bringing a smile to everyone in the world, and beseeched him to carry on with his quest.

Dragon Quest XI S contains an additional scenario which recounts Sylvando's activities between the darkening of the world and his reunion with the Luminary and his party. Players assume the role of Sylvando, who is accompanied by his ship captain Dave, a pirate who wears a pink mask. The story arc explores the origins behind Sylvando's Soldiers of Smile troupe and how he recruits various men during his travels in an effort to bring some semblance of hope back into the world.

Outside of Dragon Quest titles, Sylvando, known by his original Japanese name Silvia and voiced by Masaya Onosaka, is a playable character in the 2017 video game Itadaki Street Dragon Quest & Final Fantasy 30th Anniversary.

== Promotion and reception ==
An action figure of Sylvando is bundled as a set along with an action figure of Rab, another companion character from Dragon Quest XI, as well as accessories like Sylvando's sword, flute, and a liquid metal slime. Part of the BRING ARTS action figure line, the figures include display sets and were released in November 2019.

Sylvando has been well received by players. In January 2020, Famitsu published the results of their overseas poll for Dragon Quest XI S, which revealed Sylvando as the most popular Dragon Quest XI character for international audiences. Critics similarly approve of Sylvando, with some considering the character to be one of the best features in the game. Alistair Wong from Siliconera opined that Sylvando's popularity with fans is derived from his flamboyant personality which hides a knight's honor, as well as his positivity and desire to make everyone smile. Andy Moore from Paste Magazine summarized him as "witty, brave, and full of joy". Vladimir Olivares from CBR called Sylvando one of the very best companion characters in JRPG's, as his "charming personality, boundless enthusiasm, and undying support" for the Luminary's cause made him very endearing.

Chris Shive from Hardcore Gamer was highly appreciative of the character, and suggested that "he is possibly the greatest video game character since Battleborn's Montana". Shive observed that Sylvando quickly proves himself as a character who is initially presented as one with unclear motives to one of the nicest and most entertaining characters in the game, and that his "charismatic flamboyancy" is infectious regardless of the gravity of the situation. Shive also praised the moment of Sylvando's reconciliation with his father for its resonance, alluding to real life situations where many people who deviate from their family's expectations do not experience the same happy outcome as Sylvando and his father. Jenni Lada from Siliconera described him as an incredibly honorable and virtuous character who does not waver in his beliefs, and that even if he had abandoned the path to knighthood, not only does he retain a spirit of chivalry just like his father, but he also possesses the strength to forge his own path of chivalry by remaining dedicated to his ideals in the face of adversity.

Tim Rogers from Kotaku analyzed Sylvando's appearance and role within Dragon Quest XI in detail, from his introduction where he critiques and deconstructs the “toxic masculinity” of the cowardly Prince Faris, to his fully realized character arc and likeable personality. Rogers also highlighted Sylvando's gameplay utility as a versatile and physically strong combatant who has access to a large variety of weapons, and can readily adapt to any playstyle or party member pairings. Rogers thought of Sylvando as an unusual character who is not bound by the usual conventions and tropes found in JRPG's: for example, Rogers noted that he is very competent at dealing direct damage to enemies in combat, but players can also use his turn to elevate a weaker party member up to his physical level which in Rogers' view is a self-sacrificing move. Rogers suggested that Sylvando's gameplay mechanics allude to his role as an entertainer who can get along with anyone, thus forming "a separately intricate, mechanically crucial battle dynamic with each other character". Scott Baird from TheGamer agreed that Sylvando is a powerful party member with access to some of the game's best buff and debuff abilities, which is belied by his character design that is similar to a bard from Dungeons & Dragons.

Sylvando's perceived sexuality had been the subject of discussion. Olivares considered Sylvando's presentation to be a "very respectful portrayal of an openly gay character". Moore observed that while his sexuality is "not specifically defined in game, it remains ambiguous throughout", and claimed that the game never veers into harmful stereotyping. Baird emphasized that players took a liking to the character, even though there were early concerns about potential pushback against a "flamboyant character with a queer-coded personality" by the series' fanbase prior to the release of Dragon Quest XI. Rogers noted that Sylvando is a character who can use a "manly" sword as well as a whip, a stereotypically "girly" weapon according to JRPG tropes. Shive highlighted a particularly memorable scene for him in the game's second act, where Sylvando saves a non-player character after making a big spectacle of his reappearance as the leader of a parade of revelers, which ends with Sylvando bestowing the Luminary a feathered frock called a "Mardi Garb" to wear.

Other commentators paint a more complicated picture of the portrayal of Sylvando's behaviour within the context of the game's overall presentation of sexual minorities. Cameron Kunzelman from Vice noted the game's regressive attitude on any topic or trope about sex and sexuality, in particular the presence of numerous reductive gay-code tropes. By contrast, Sylvando is "constantly valorized in the game’s plot as courageous, skilled, and generally just more wise than everyone else on the team", with one early scene where he saves the entire party highlighted by Kunzelman as "one of the best-timed sight gags" that he has seen in a video game. Kunzelman found Sylvando to be the pivotal difference between certain scenes being watchable or otherwise, and his characterization is one of the game's rough patches that "at least gives it some heart". Jeremy Signor from Gaymingmag said a fundamental flaw with Sylvando is that he is never explicitly confirmed to be a gay man in-universe. Signor emphasized that gay male characters in fiction are often one-note personalities who are defined by their exaggerated "gay" behavior, or a heteronormative perspective of what "gayness" is, and that it is often represented as a form of mockery. Signor felt that the implication of Sylvando's sexuality as comic relief in certain scenes is still typical of Japanese media's portrayal of gay men, who are regularly illustrated as possessing stereotypically effeminate personas, and that it is further compounded by the controversy surrounding the nationalist and socially conservative views of the game's composer Koichi Sugiyama. Nevertheless, Signor conceded that Sylvando is at the very least, allowed to be a hero who is competent at something "other than making heterosexual people uncomfortable", a feature few other video games have attempted with their gay characters.

Shai Matheson's voice performance, described as a "buoyant Spanish accent" by Jason Wilson from VentureBeat, has received praise. Edward Hawkes from Eurogamer praised Matheson's performance as his "favourite piece of video game voice work", and Jason Hidalgo from Reno Gazette Journal said Matheson successfully captured Sylvando's personality "without being annoying or over the top".
