= Dragon Quest V =

1992 video game

Dragon Quest V: Hand of the Heavenly Bride
- Box art of the original Super Famicom release
- Developers: Chunsoft (SFC); ArtePiazza (PS2, DS, iOS, Android); Matrix Software (PS2)
- Publishers: Enix (SFC); Square Enix (PS2, DS, iOS, Android)
- Director: Manabu Yamana
- Producer: Yukinobu Chida
- Designer: Yuji Horii
- Programmers: Kenichi Masuta; Togo Narita
- Artist: Akira Toriyama
- Writer: Yuji Horii
- Composer: Koichi Sugiyama
- Series: Dragon Quest
- Platforms: Super Famicom, PlayStation 2, Nintendo DS, Android, iOS
- Release: September 27, 1992: Super Famicom; JP: September 27, 1992; KR: Late 1992 PlayStation 2; JP: March 25, 2004 Nintendo DS; JP: July 17, 2008; NA: February 17, 2009; AU: February 19, 2009; EU: February 20, 2009 Android, iOS; JP: December 12, 2014; WW: January 22, 2015
- Genre: Role-playing
- Mode: Single-player

Dragon Quest V: Hand of the Heavenly Bride, known in Europe as Dragon Quest: The Hand of the Heavenly Bride and in Japan as Dragon Quest V: Bride of Heaven, (Note: Japanese: ドラゴンクエストV 天空の花嫁, Hepburn: Doragon Kuesuto Faibu: Tenkū no Hanayome) is a 1992 role-playing video game developed by Chunsoft and published by Enix for the Super Famicom. The fifth main installment in the Dragon Quest series, the game was the first title in the franchise to not be initially localized in North America due to programming issues.

It later had an enhanced remake only in Japan for the PlayStation 2 in 2004. The remake was developed by ArtePiazza and Matrix Software. Another remake was made for the Nintendo DS, which was released in Japan in July 2008 and worldwide in February 2009; this marks the first time the game had officially released in English. In addition, ports for Android and iOS were released in Japan in December 2014, and worldwide the following month.

The game takes place over roughly thirty years of the main character's life, from when he is born through to when he gets married and has a family. The title introduced a gameplay dynamic in which monsters from random encounters may offer to join the player's party. This concept was used in later Dragon Quest games, as well as in the Dragon Quest Monsters series as the primary way to form a party. The game's monster-collecting concept had been used before in the Megami Tensei series and appeared in many later franchises such as Pokémon, Digimon and Dokapon. In turn, the concept of collecting everything in a game, in the form of achievements or similar rewards, has since become a common trend in video games. Dragon Quest V has also been credited as the first known video game to feature a playable pregnancy, a concept that has since appeared in later games such as Story of Seasons, The Sims 2 and Fable II. In 2019, an animated film adaptation, Dragon Quest: Your Story, was released in Japan. The film was later released digitally for other regions through Netflix.

== Gameplay ==
The Hero on an overworld area with two monsters as his companions and a wagon in the Super Famicom version

Dragon Quest V uses basic role-playing video game mechanics seen in the rest of the series, which includes leveling up by gaining experience points through battle, first person turn-based battles, and equipping weapons and armor. Something new to the Dragon Quest series is the ability to tame monsters into the player's party. The monsters can be used in battle and level up like the human characters. Monsters sometimes request to join the Hero after battles if the party is strong enough. There are a total of 40 monsters that are capable of joining the Hero's party in the Super Famicom version, with 71 in the PlayStation 2 remake.

Several party management features from Dragon Quest IV are carried forward. Like IV, this game has a wagon where members of the Hero's party can rest while exploring the world. The tactics system also returns, but with the added option of controlling allies manually for the entire game. Unlike IV, the original Super Famicom version of V has a maximum of three active party members; this was changed in the remakes on the PlayStation 2 and Nintendo DS to include up to four members in an active party.

After beating the game, players can gain access to the bonus dungeon. Dragon Quest V was the first Dragon Quest game to have a bonus dungeon (although the remakes of Dragon Quest III and IV added bonus dungeons later).

== Story ==
The DS version uses both screens to depict a battle.

=== Characters ===
- The Hero (主人公, shujinkō) is, in the early chapters of the game, a six-year-old boy who travels all around the world along with his father, Pankraz. After Pankraz's death, the Hero becomes enslaved and is forced to undergo hard labor in the building of a great temple. Ten years later, he finally escapes, and he starts a journey to find out the secrets of his father's past. Soon he finds out that his mother, Mada (マーサ, Māsa), who was said to have died soon after the Hero was born, is still alive and so he sets forth to rescue her from the underworld and locate the fabled Legendary Hero.
- Pankraz Gotha (パパス, Papasu) is the father of the Hero. Though he was once the king of Gotha (グランバニア, Guranbania), he left his homeland to search for his wife and for the Legendary Hero.
- Sancho (サンチョ) is Pankranz's loyal attendant, who later aids the Hero and his children.
- Bianca Whitaker (ビアンカ, Bianka) is the tomboy daughter of innkeepers of Roundbeck (アルカパ, Arukapa) and a childhood friend of the Hero. She helps the Hero save the Great Sabercub from two bullies, and asks the Hero to take it with him. After growing up, she moves to a mountainside village to aid in her father's recuperation, during which time her mother died. After meeting the grown-up Hero, Bianca briefly joins him in his quest. Bianca is one of two (three in the Nintendo DS version) women whom the player can choose to marry the Hero.
- Nera Briscoletti (フローラ, Furōra) is a gentle and modest girl, and the daughter of Rodrigo Briscoletti (ルドマン, Rudoman). Her father is a wealthy man who seeks his daughter's bridegroom, but will only accept a man who is able to pass his trial. She is the second of the player's choices for the Hero's bride.
- Debora Briscoletti (デボラ, Debora) is Nera's haughty and materialistic older sister and the third choice for the Hero's bride. Debora constantly berates the Hero and makes it evident that she is the dominant one in the relationship; however, she expresses her love in humorous ways such as telling him he is the best servant she has had and would never replace him. Debora actually has a motherly side when with the children and truly supports the Hero in his quest to save his mother. She was neither in the original version nor the PS2 remake, but was added in the Nintendo DS remake.
- Prince Harry (ヘンリー, Henrī) is the elder son of the King of Coburg. When he first met the hero, he was initially very mean to him and stuck up. He is sold into slavery along with the Hero, as a result of his time as a slave, he becomes more responsible and forms a strong friendship with the Hero. He is with the Hero when he begins his quest to find his mother, but the responsibility to his people keeps him from staying on the team for very long. He also falls in love with Maria, the slave he and the Hero saved, and shortly after restoring order to Coburg, proposes to her. Harry later has a son named Kendrick, who resembles Harry as a boy.
- The Hero's Son (男の子, otokonoko) is the Legendary Hero that Pankraz was originally searching for, but was not born until much later. He wields the Zenithian Sword and wears the Zenithian armour.
- The Hero's Daughter (女の子, onnanoko) is the twin sister of the Hero's Son. Like her father, she has the ability to understand animals and monsters.
- Order of Zugzwang is a religious organization that aims to create a "White King's Paradise" to save everyone from the coming darkness. In reality, they worship Grandmaster Nimzo as a god and is a front for infiltration by the forces of Nadiria for their world conquest.

=== Setting ===
Like the first Dragon Quest trilogy, where Alefgard appeared in games I, II, and III with roughly similar geography in each game, the worlds of IV, V, and VI are connected in that the sky castle Zenithia appears in each game, although the base geography is largely different between the three games. Like all other Dragon Quest games, this one takes place in a medieval world with scarce modern technology. Characters fight with swords, clubs, and magic instead of guns or other modern weapons.

The quest takes the Hero and his party to many exotic locations, such as a fairy village, a mansion made of ice, several caves, and a volcano. The party eventually makes its way to Zenithia, which is a castle in each game of the Zenithian Trilogy. Similar to the previous two entries in the series, the final enemies reside in a dark world, separate from the main map.

=== Plot ===
Dragon Quest V begins with a brief scene of the Hero's birth in which the player gives the Hero a name. Afterwards, the Hero, as a child, and his father, Pankraz travel to meet Sancho, an old friend. The Hero meets Bianca and the two explore the haunted Uptaten Towers (レヌール, Renūru), where they obtain a mysterious Golden Orb. The next day, the Hero notices a man in the town who looks similar to him, albeit much older. That man asks the Hero to show him the Golden Orb and, after returning it, asks him to take care of his father Pankraz. The first section of the story ends with Pankraz being killed by Ladja (ゲマ, Gema), a mysterious member of the Order of Zugzwang, when he tries to protect his son and Prince Harry. The two children are then taken into slavery.

The story continues ten years later, and the Hero and Harry have grown up working on a giant temple, but escape as the scene opens. The Hero travels to the west to the town of Mostroferrato, where the wealthy nobleman Rodrigo Briscoletti and his daughter Nera live. Rodrigo sends the Hero on a quest to retrieve two magic rings, called the Circle of Fire and the Circle of Water, as a test of his worthiness as a suitor for Nera. The Hero accomplishes this and Rodrigo offers the Hero the chance to marry Nera, but it is also possible for him to marry Bianca or Debora (DS). After the marriage, the Hero travels to his homeland of Gotha, where they make him king. His wife has two children, but is kidnapped by monsters. When the Hero comes to rescue her, both are turned to stone by the monsters.

The Hero is found by his two children eight years later and is revived. Travelling the world to collect the legendary Zenithian armaments for the Legendary Hero, it is discovered that the Hero's son is indeed the Legendary Hero sought by Pankraz almost twenty years ago. During this stage of the journey, the Hero avenges Pankraz by killing Ladja, and restores the Dragon God, as well as Zenithia castle, to their proper homes in the sky. To accomplish this, the Hero has to enter a time warp to retrieve the Golden Orb from his child self.

After returning to the temple the Hero helped build as a slave, the Zenithian armor is found, as well as the statue of his wife. After the king of the Order of Zugzwang, Korol (イブール, Ibuul), is defeated, the party is informed by him that the Hero's mother, Madalena (マーサ, Martha) remains in the dark world of Nadiria, and that the god of darkness, Grandmaster Nimzo (ミルドラース, Mirudorāsu), is lying in wait for the Legendary Hero there. The Hero, his wife, and their children agree not to leave Madalena in the Nadiria, so together they travel there via a portal near Lofty Peak, soon reaching Mt. Zugzwang. Madalena is found within, but is killed by Nimzo shortly after meeting the Hero and his family. The party continues on to confront and destroy Nimzo. They return to Gotha, and have a joyful party. As the family celebrates, Pankraz and Mada watch their son and his family from the heavens, happy and content with their progeny.

== Development ==
=== Production ===
As with the other main games in the Dragon Quest series, Dragon Quest V's scenario was designed by Yuji Horii, whereas the artwork was done by Akira Toriyama, of Dragon Ball fame. When designing the sprites for the game, they were given outlines to give it a manga style. As with every previous Dragon Quest game, Koichi Sugiyama composed the music and directed all the associated spinoffs. A compilation of the game's music was put on the album Dragon Quest V ~Bride of the Heavens~ Symphonic Suite, which was released in Japan in October 1992, and included both the original SFC soundtrack as well as an symphonic arrangement. Being the first mainline Dragon Quest game on the Super Famicom, it had noticeably improved graphics and sound quality due to the Super Famicom's superior hardware and it having more available RAM to work with. The completion of Dragon Quest V's production also marked the moment of time where game developer Chunsoft had stepped away from the Dragon Quest series so they could pursue independently developing their own games.

=== PlayStation 2 remake ===
In the PlayStation 2 version with updated graphics, while menu commands and character stats are displayed, the Hero travels at night on an overworld area with three monsters as his companions and a wagon.

Square Enix released a PlayStation 2 enhanced remake of Dragon Quest V on March 25, 2004, with first day sales of 722,000. As of April 2004, the game has sold over 1.5 million copies making it the top selling Dragon Quest remake game of all time, and is available in Japan as an Ultimate Hits title. The remake was developed by former Dragon Quest VII art directors, Artepiazza. It features 3D graphics that are similar to Dragon Quest VII, but it utilizes the extra PlayStation 2 graphical capabilities. The Hero and his companions have to fight more monsters in the PlayStation 2 remake than they did in the Super Famicom original, but the character limit on the party has been increased from three to four. Also, there were only 40 monsters available to the player's party in the Super Famicom version of Dragon Quest V due to ROM limitations. The PlayStation 2 remake, however, does not suffer from this restriction. The music was orchestrated and is performed by the NHK Symphony Orchestra.

Another new feature in the remake is the famous local trinkets museum where the player has to collect local specialties from all around the world, return the items back to a character named "Yuujii" (literally old man ghost), and receive rewards for them. The Dragon Quest V remake was the third Dragon Quest to be released in the Square Enix name (after Kenshin Dragon Quest and Slime Morimori Dragon Quest). Lastly, a Dragon Quest VIII preview video disc was included in the Japanese release of the Dragon Quest V remake.

=== Nintendo DS remake ===
The Dragon Quest V remake for the Nintendo DS was announced in late 2007 by Square Enix, to be developed by ArtePiazza. The game uses the same engine as the DS remake of Dragon Quest IV.

On April 23, 2008, it was reported that Square Enix had applied for the trademark "Hand of the Heavenly Bride" at the United States Patent and Trademark Office. It was confirmed to be a reference to Dragon Quest V by a listing from Nintendo of third-party titles for Nintendo platforms. On May 20, 2008, Square Enix opened up the North American site featuring the three Dragon Quest DS remakes, acknowledging the game would see a release in North America. On the following day, Square Enix sent out a press release saying that the game would be released in Europe under the name Dragon Quest: The Hand of the Heavenly Bride. It was released on July 17, 2008, in Japan., February 17, 2009 in North America, and February 20, 2009, in Europe.

Included with the remake is the PlayStation 2 update of being able to have four members in a party at a time instead of just three. Also, there is a new third girl Debora Briscoletti (Deborah in Japan), who is available for the Hero to marry. Yuji Horii described her as a character "nobody in their right mind would pick!" and that "it was the perfect way to torment players just a little more."

The iOS and Android versions replaced the orchestrated music with the synthesized MIDI music in the title screen, which is performed by the Tokyo Metropolitan Symphony Orchestra. However, the synthesized music is entirely remastered in the iOS and Android versions, other than the synthesized music in the DS version.

== Manga ==
Doragon Kuesuto Tenkū Monogatari (ドラゴンクエスト天空物語, lit. Dragon Quest: Tale of Heaven; Dragon Quest: Tale of Zenithia) is an eleven volume manga series based on Dragon Quest V by Chino Yukimiya, which ran in 1997, and again in 2001. The story follows the travels of the Hero's children Sora (空), the daughter, and Ten (天), the son, along with retainer Sancho (サンチョ) to find the Hero, who has been turned to stone. This manga fills in the 10-year gap presented between generations two and three in the game Dragon Quest V.

== Reception ==
Reception

Aggregate score
Aggregator	Score			
Aggregator	DS	iOS	PS2	SNES
Metacritic	84/100	90/100		

Review scores
Publication	Score			
Publication	DS	iOS	PS2	SNES
1Up.com	A+			
Edge	8/10			
Eurogamer	8/10			
Famitsu	36/40; 90%		34/40; 90%	9/10, 10/10, 9/10, 8/10
GameSpot	8.5/10			
IGN	8.9/10			
Nintendo Power	8.5/10			
Official Nintendo Magazine	90%			
Pocket Gamer		4.5/5		
TouchArcade		5/5		
Dengeki PlayStation			36.5/40	
Gaming Age		A		
HonestGamers				4.5/5

Awards
Publication	Award
Famitsu	All Time Top 100 (11th)
Famitsu	All Time Top 100 (40th)
Sony Computer Entertainment	Favorite PlayStation Game of All Time

=== Sales ===
Like the other games in the series, Dragon Quest V was very popular in Japan. Prior to release, it reportedly had 300,000 pre-orders. Upon release, long queues formed outside stores across Japan, with Computer and Video Games reporting queues up to 3 miles long in certain locations, along with ten reported incidents of theft on release day. The game sold out over 1.3 million cartridges within one day of its release in Japan, higher than the Super Famicom version of Street Fighter II earlier the same year. Dragon Quest V was Japan's top-selling game from October to November 1992. It became a multi-million seller by December 1992, and ended the year as the best-selling home video game of 1992 in Japan. The success of Dragon Quest V led to rising demand for the Super Famicom, which increased in price following the game's release. The game was also a commercial success overseas in South Korea, where it was the third best-selling game of 1992, below Street Fighter II and Final Fantasy V. By 1993, the original Super Famicom version of Dragon Quest V had sold 2.8 million cartridges in Japan, and nearly 3 million copies worldwide, grossing several hundred million dollars (about $690 million adjusted for inflation).

The PS2 remake sold an additional 1.64 million copies. The Nintendo DS remake of Dragon Quest V: Hand of the Heavenly Bride was the seventh best-selling game of Japan in 2008, selling 1,176,082 copies that year. The game went on to sell 1.35 million copies worldwide by 2009, including 1.22 million in Japan, 70,000 in Europe, and 60,000 in North America. To date, it has sold 1.36 million in Japan, adding up to 1.49 million worldwide for the DS version. All three versions of the game have combined sales of 5.8 million units in Japan, and at least 5.93 million units worldwide.

=== Critical response ===
Dragon Quest V was met with critical acclaim. Famitsu's panel of four reviewers gave the original Super Famicom version ratings of 9, 10, 9 and 8 out of 10, adding up to 36 out of 40 overall. This made it one of their three highest-rated games of 1992, along with Shin Megami Tensei and World of Illusion Starring Mickey Mouse and Donald Duck. Dragon Quest V was also one of only eleven games to have received a Famitsu score of 36/40 or above up until 1992. The PS2 remake received a score of 34 out of 40 from Famitsu, while they gave the DS remake a score of 36 out of 40, with all four reviewers giving it 9 out of 10.

The way the story is divided by different periods of time has been praised, something that has appeared in very few video games. The game's execution of its coming of age theme has also been praised, with Gamasutra stating that "never has it been executed so magnificently as Dragon Quest V." Dragon Quest V has also been acknowledged as Yuji Horii's favourite in the series.

The Nintendo DS remake has been called one of the best RPGs on the DS and has been said to have "some of the best story telling on the system". Although critics agreed that the game's interface feels archaic and overly simple at times, many cite that the emotional plot more than makes up for the game's flaws, stated that it is one of the "greatest classic RPGs". 1UP praised it for its mature storytelling that "gets better with age" and resonates with players with a "more mature and experienced" perspective going through similar phases in their own life. The updated 3D environments with rotable camera have also received praise.

In 2006, the Japanese gaming magazine Famitsu had readers vote on the top one hundred games of all time, Dragon Quest V coming in at number 11 and the PS2 remake at number 40. In 2014, Sony Computer Entertainment conducted a poll with over 10,000 Japanese fans, where Dragon Quest V was voted the favorite PlayStation game of all time, the fourth best game that impressed "more than a movie or a novel", and the sixth most wanted remake. In a 2021 poll conducted by TV Asahi, polling over 50,000 Japanese users, Dragon Quest V was voted the second best console game of all time, just below The Legend of Zelda: Breath of the Wild.

== Film adaptation ==
Dragon Quest: Your Story, a 3DCG animated movie based on Dragon Quest V, was released on 2 August 2019 in Japan.
