= Dragon Quest VI =

1995 video game

Dragon Quest VI: Realms of Revelation
- Box art of the original Super Famicom release
- Developer: Heartbeat
- Publishers: Super Famicom; JP: Enix; Nintendo DS; JP: Square Enix; WW: Nintendo; iOS, Android; WW: Square Enix
- Director: Manabu Yamana
- Producer: Yukinobu Chida
- Designer: Yuji Horii
- Programmer: Manabu Yamana
- Artist: Akira Toriyama
- Writer: Yuji Horii
- Composer: Koichi Sugiyama
- Series: Dragon Quest
- Platforms: Super Famicom, Nintendo DS, iOS, Android
- Release: Super Famicom; JP: December 9, 1995; Nintendo DS; JP: January 28, 2010; NA: February 14, 2011; EU: May 20, 2011; iOS, Android; JP: June 10, 2015; WW: June 24, 2015
- Genre: Role-playing
- Mode: Single-player

Dragon Quest VI: Realms of Revelation, (Note: Known in Japan as Dragon Quest VI: Maboroshi no Daichi, lit. "Dragon Quest VI: World of Phantoms" (Japanese: ドラゴンクエストVI 幻の大地).) known in Europe & Australia as Dragon Quest VI: Realms of Reverie, is a 1995 role-playing video game developed by Heartbeat and published by Enix for the Super Famicom as a part of the Dragon Quest series and as the last Dragon Quest game in the Zenithian Trilogy. It was released in Japan in December 1995, developed by Heartbeat; whereas the previous Dragon Quest games were developed by Chunsoft. In 2011, a remake of the game, along with Dragon Quest IV and Dragon Quest V, was released worldwide for the Nintendo DS, making this the first time the game was released in English. Another version of the game for Android and iOS devices was released in Japan in June 2015.

As the sixth installment to the Dragon Quest series, the graphics and gameplay remain close to the other games, with minor additions and upgrades. The graphics were vastly improved from Dragon Quest V, which was also for the Super Famicom, but had more rudimentary graphics due to being an early game on the console. Navigation remains largely unchanged from the previous games and the turn-based battles are still in first-person. The class system from Dragon Quest III returns, with minor adjustments. Dragon Quest VI sold over three million copies in Japan, becoming the best selling game of 1995. The DS version sold an additional one million copies by March 2010.

The story follows the traditional Dragon Quest "Hero" on a quest to save the world. In this particular installment, the heroes also have to endure the personal struggle of amnesia, as many of the main characters do not initially remember who they are. After completing a series of quests, the player learns that in addition to a Real World, there is also a Dream World, made up of people's dreams, and that there is a great evil that wants to conquer both. The Hero and his new party work together to save both worlds from the ever-growing threat.

== Gameplay ==
An example of battle, from the original Super Famicom version

Dragon Quest VI is a traditional, turn-based role-playing video game (in an overhead perspective) that features random battles and a character class system that the Hero and his party members acquire new skills and spells.

The Hero travels around the world gathering a party throughout his adventure. To progress in the story, the party must defeat specific boss monsters or trigger specific flags. In order to defeat the bosses, the player must spend time training the party by gaining experience points from battles to advance in character and class levels.

Other new features were added to the series, such as: the monsters being animated when they attack. The Slime Arena and Best Dresser Contest were new mini-games introduced; the casinos return from previous Dragon Quest games.

Like previous games, mini medals can be found hidden throughout the worlds and can be traded for items. There are bonus dungeons and a few extra characters after beating the main storyline. There is a day and night system, as in some previous installments; with certain storyline events happening at night.

While the Monster Master class can catch monsters in the original Super Famicom version it is not a major part of the game. Another returning feature from the past two games is the use of the wagon, which allows characters to be swapped out for other ones on the world map.

=== Class system ===
This Dragon Quest, similar to Dragon Quest III and Dragon Quest VII, has a class system. Once the party gets to Alltrades Abbey, they have the option of becoming one of several starter classes. Each class has eight levels, which are gained by winning a specific number of battles (unlike character levels, which are gained by earning experience points), and advancing in level teaches a character new spells and / or skills, which are retained across class changes.

Once a character has mastered a specific set of two or three starter classes, they can change into a hybrid class that builds on their themes. For example: mastering Warrior and Martial Artist unlocks the Gladiator Class, which learns powerful physical attacks, and mastering certain hybrid classes unlocks the Hero class.

Some of the classes give special bonuses beyond their stats and abilities such as the Merchant who gives a small bonus to the party's income after every battle, or the Sage who receives a discount to MP costs.

To master a class, the character must fight a set number of battles as that class. Once certain hybrid classes are mastered, a stat relating to that class will permanently go up. There are two secret classes as well, Dragon (Hackasaurus) and Liquid Metal Slime, which are unlocked through consumable books.

Dragon Quest VI was the first game in the series to include abilities or skills (トクギ, tokugi) (special attacks and other techniques that are not spells and usually do not cost MP) for human party members. These special techniques were added to the remakes of III, IV and V later on.

== Plot ==
=== Setting ===
Like the other Dragon Quest games in the series, the setting of Dragon Quest VI is medieval, complete with castles, knights, and magic. The main world is divided into the "Real World" and "Dream World", each with a separate, but similar map. To get from one world to the other, the party uses special warps (such as in wells), by ascending/descending stairs on the world map or falling through holes in the "Dream World" to the "Real World". If something cannot be found in the "Real World", it may appear in the "Dream World", such as with Spiegelspire, at the middle of the game.

=== Story ===
Dragon Quest VI opens as the Hero and his party of a mysterious woman and a bulky man approach Murdaw, the demon king's castle. After the woman uses an ocarina to summon a dragon, the party enters the castle and comes face to face with the Dreadfiend Murdaw (Demon King Mudō "魔王ムドー" in Japanese version). Overpowering the trio, the demon king appears to destroy each member of the party, but suddenly, the Hero wakes up in the mountain town Weaver's Peak. Tania, a young woman from Weaver's Peak, insists that he was having a bad dream and introduces herself as his sister.

After getting out of bed, the town elder tasks the Hero to get a crown in preparation for the annual Mountain Spirit festival, which takes him to Haggleton. The hero finds out the man who is supposed to make the crown has gone out somewhere to the northwest of town and never came back. The Hero heads in that direction and finds a large hole with the crown maker just barely hanging on. The hero attempts to rescue him and succeeds, but in the process, slips and falls to the world below. In this mysterious world, the Hero finds a nearby town in which the townspeople cannot see him. The Hero receives a tip from one of the townspeople: There is a special well to the north from which people who enter never come back; the Hero heads in that direction, enters the well, and returns to his world.

After receiving the ceremonial crown from the crown maker for no charge after saving his life, the Hero heads back to Weaver's Peak just in time for the festival to begin. During the festival, the Hero receives a mysterious vision that a great evil will take over the world; the elder asks him to leave the village in preparation for this disaster. The next day, the Hero finds out that the world that he stumbled onto was called the "Phantom World" and is given a pass by the elder that allows him entry into Somnia, where he can meet the king.

At Somnia, the Hero meets Carver, who does not seem to remember the Hero. The Hero then meets Captain Blade, leader of Somnia's military, who gives the potential soldier candidates a task to find a special item in a tower. The Hero manages to find this item successfully and formally becomes a soldier of Somnia. After a task, the Hero and Carver work together to obtain a horse for an old man. Carver also becomes a soldier of Somnia. The Hero and Carver speak to the king, who informs them that to defeat Murdaw, they need the Mirror of Ra. The Hero and Carver discover another portal similar to the one near Haggleton, which eventually leads them to Port Haven, another town where they can not be seen. Milly, also appearing to have lost her memory, sees them and helps them become visible via Madame Luca's help.

The party discovers a Somnia Castle in the “Phantom World” and learns that the prince—who looks like the Hero—is missing. They also meet Captain Rusty, who bears a striking resemblance to Captain Blade. Gaining entrance to the Moonmirror Tower, the party meets Ashlynn, a woman who was invisible in the “Phantom World” at first, too, and together they find the Mirror of Ra. The party travels to Murdaw's castle in the original world. After defeating Murdaw, the Hero uses the Mirror on him. Murdaw then turns into the King of Somnia, confused and unaware of what happened. The king reveals that the original world is in fact the Dream World and the Phantom World is the Real World. Upon traveling back to the Real World, the King of Somnia thanks the party for defeating Murdaw in his dreams, but the real Murdaw lives and that the party must travel to Ghent to retrieve a boat to get to Murdaw's lair. In Ghent, Nevan, a healer, joins the party and allows them to use the Ghent Clan's ship. During the fight with the real Murdaw, the Hero is again sent back to Weaver's Peak. With the Mirror of Ra, however, the Hero warps back into the battle and defeats Murdaw.

The Queen of Somnia tells the Hero to discover who he really is. This quest leads the party to Arkbolt, where a terrible monster is blocking a nearby cave. The reward for defeating the monster is the famed Sunderbolt Blade, but before the party can strike the final blow, a warrior by the name of Terry kills the monster, winning the sword. After traveling both worlds, the party learns that Murdaw was not the only evil in the world, having fought several other monsters that all seem to be connected.

In Sorceria, the party learns that this is Ashlynn's home. The elders tell Ashlynn that the Demon Lord is watching her and give her the powerful spell Magic Burst to fight him. The party also learns that the only way to get to the Demon Lord is through Zenith Tower, but to activate the tower, they need to collect the sword, armor, shield, and helmet of legend. While doing so, the Hero meets his double in Real Weaver's Peak, who gets spooked, and speaks 'Y-You. Y-You're m-m-me!', and says that he must prove himself to be faithful to his family if he is to join powers. Returning to Real Somnia, the King and Queen tell the Hero that he is indeed the prince. When he fused with his clone, the Hero gained his memory back, much like Ashlynn and Carver previously.

The party reaches Cloudsgate Citadel and meets Dhuran (デュラン), who claims to have taken over the castle. He summons Terry to fight the party and then fights the party himself. Dhuran then reveals that all the enemies the party has faced were just pawns of Mortamor, the Archfiend. Milly reveals that Terry is her brother and Terry decides to join the party and fight against Mortamor.

Once Cloudsgate Citadel returns to normal, the party speaks to King Zenith who informs them of Mortamor's doings and how to reach the Dread Realm. Mortamor plans on merging both worlds. The party's horse fuses with Pegasus, allowing the party to fly to the Dread Realm. Several challenges await in the Dread Realm, including the party's strength suddenly and unexpectedly plummeting. With the help of two Supreme Sage brothers, Benjamin and Isaac, the party enters Mortamor's Castle. After solving many puzzles, they come face to face with Mortamor and defeat him. Isaac reveals that the Dread Realm is falling apart and Pegasus helps them escape. After returning to the Real World, everyone parts ways, with Ashlynn having to return to the Dream World since her Real World self no longer exists. With Mortamor's link between the Real World and the Dream World severed, the Dream World vanishes, with only Cloudgate Castle remaining visible in the Real World. Ashlynn is then shown in the castle, taking care of the newly hatched Zenithian Dragon.

== Development ==
=== Production ===
The scenario designer, as in all previous Dragon Quest games, was Yuji Horii. Similarly, the lead artist was Akira Toriyama and the sound was composed by Koichi Sugiyama. This is the last game in the series to feature in the Zenithia (天空の城, Tenkū no Shiro lit. "Sky Castle") trilogy. The appearance of the character Terry was originally Toriyama's design for the game's Hero, but it was rejected by Horii and given to a companion instead.

A prequel, Dragon Warrior Monsters (Dragon Quest Monsters: Terry's Wonderland in Japan), was released in 1998. This game featured Terry and Milly years before the events of Dragon Quest VI. It was released in North America the next year, even though Dragon Quest VI was never released in North America. Along with Terry and Milly, several of the main enemies, including Mortamor, reappear. Their previous roles have been eliminated, however, making them appear as just normal enemies. Mortamor and Murdaw (DeathMore and Mudou, respectively, in the localization) do appear as very challenging, very late in-game bosses, though.

=== Release ===
The initial release was delayed over a year because of Enix wanting to further develop their game. The game was eventually shown at Shoshinkai in November 1995. Dragon Quest VI was released a few weeks later on December 9, with the very steep price of 11,400 yen (roughly over 100 U.S. dollars). The game went on to sell over 3.2 million copies. In Japan, the game made the news in 2005, when a Japanese student threatened another student over an argument about which Dragon Quest is the best, the student doing the threatening favoring Dragon Quest VI.

Like its predecessor, Dragon Quest VI did not receive an English-language localization because of being cost-ineffective. At 4MB, it was one of the largest games made for the Super Famicom as well as the largest the console could support without adding bank-switching circuitry to the cartridge, and translating it would have necessitated even bigger and more expensive ROMs. In addition, the game was a late release for the Super Famicom and by the time an English localization could be finished, Enix had already dropped support for the console in North America and moved to the PlayStation.

=== Nintendo DS remake ===
The Dragon Quest VI enhanced remake for the Nintendo DS was announced in late 2007 by Square Enix and was developed by ArtePiazza. The game was released in Japan on January 28, 2010, in North America on February 14, 2011, and in Europe on May 20, 2011.

This version has a few differences

- The after-battle monster recruitment has been removed. In the original 1995 Super Famicom version of Dragon Quest VI, certain types of monsters can be randomly recruited if they are defeated with a Monster Master in the party. In the 2010 DS remake, this system has been removed, instead, there are certain Slimes that will join you once you accomplish a specific task. Lizzie still remains recruitable.
- Since this version comes with a built in map of both worlds on the top of the screen, the World Map and the Magic Map have been removed.
- The 'Tag Mode' system from Dragon Quest IX has been implemented, which allows wireless communication and data transfer between two DS systems.
- A Slime Curling mini-game was added.
- The names of the following characters from this game were changed in Dragon Quest IX as follows: Mireille (Mireyu) as Milly, Hassan as Carver, Barbara (Bābara) as Ashlynn, Redach (Reidakku) as Somnia, and San Marino as Port Haven.

On April 28, 2008, it was reported that Square Enix has applied for the trademark "The Realms of Reverie" at the United States Patent and Trademark Office, leading to speculation that it was the localized title for this game. On May 20, 2008, Square Enix opened up the North American site featuring the three Dragon Quest DS remakes, acknowledging Realms of Reverie as the official subtitle, as well as confirming a release in North America. The title was later changed to "Realms of Revelation" just prior to release. Listings in some stores, including on price tags and the like, still use the "Reverie" title.

Mark Franklin, director of Public Relations at Nintendo, made the claim that Dragon Quest VI: Realms of Revelation “will give fans unique access to a classic game in the series for the first time” outside Japan.

The iOS and Android versions replaced the orchestrated music with the synthesized MIDI music in the title screen, which is performed by the Tokyo Metropolitan Symphony Orchestra. However, the synthesized music is entirely remastered in the iOS and Android versions, other than the synthesized music in the DS version.

== Related media ==
=== Soundtracks ===
As with every Dragon Quest, Koichi Sugiyama composed the music and directed all the associated spinoffs. Three soundtracks were released for the music of Dragon Quest VI. The first was a two-disk soundtrack, which included an orchestral performance and an OST. The second soundtrack was released on August 23, 2000, and just had the orchestral version. This version was released by SPE Visual Works (now Aniplex), and was named Dragon Quest VI ~The Dream World~ Symphonic Suite. This version was featured on Dragon Quest Daizenshu Vol. 2, which is a compilation of Dragon Quest music. A second Symphonic Suite edition of the OST was performed in March 2005 and released on July 19, 2006, also by Aniplex. The Symphonic Suite track list is as follows:

=== Manga ===
A 10-volume manga adaptation of the game was also made, which titled Dragon Quest Maboroshi no Daichi (ドラゴンクエスト 幻の大地; lit. Dragon Quest: Land of Illusion). It was authored by Masaomi Kanzaki and published by Enix in the Monthly Shōnen Gangan between 1997 and 2001. The storyline roughly follows that of the video game from which it was based but with several differences, such as the inclusion of the character Kizu Buchi, a spotted slime.

== Reception ==
Reception

Aggregate score
| Aggregator | Score |
|---|---|
| Metacritic | DS: 78/100 iOS: 86/100 |

Review scores
| Publication | Score |
|---|---|
| 1Up.com | B |
| Famitsu | SNES: 9/10, 8/10, 9/10, 8/10; DS: 9/10, 9/10, 8/10, 8/10 |
| G4 | 4/5 |
| Game Informer | 8.5/10 |
| GamesRadar+ | 8/10 |
| GameTrailers | 8.5/10 |
| Nintendo World Report | 8.5/10 |
| Official Nintendo Magazine | 85% |
| PALGN | 9/10 |
| Pocket Gamer | 4/5 |
| TouchArcade | 4.5/5 |

Kurt Kalata of Gamasutra praised the game's storyline, particularly its innovative scenario. While comparable to the light-dark world setting of The Legend of Zelda: A Link to the Past, Dragon Quest VI featured a unique real world and dream world setting, which he suggests had an influence on the later Square role-playing games Chrono Cross and Final Fantasy X. Kalata also praised the gameplay improvements, including its class system that improves on Dragon Quest III and is now more similar to Final Fantasy V, and the addition of a bag that improves on the inventory management of previous games. He concludes that it is "still a fantastic game."

=== Sales ===
Despite the very high price of ¥11,970 ($127.26), Dragon Quest VI launched with 1,274,857 sales, and sold 2.5 million in December alone. It went on to sell 3.2 million copies in Japan, resulting in it becoming the best-selling game of 1995. In 2010, Dragon Quest VI for the Nintendo DS sold almost a million copies in Japan in its first week. The game sold over 1.2 million copies by March 2010.

According to Nintendo Power, Dragon Quest VI was originally planned for North American release in the spring of 1996 under the title "Dragon Warrior V." The Super NES localization of the game never happened, however, as Enix had already given up on the U.S. market. Square, one of the only companies still willing to bring console role-playing video games to the United States, was also still struggling to get their games to sell in the United States, and therefore, Dragon Quest VI had no companies willing to take a risk for it. In Nintendo Power vol. 81, the staff wrote an article on Dragon Quest VI, hoping the game would find a North American release. They also suggested why the series might not appeal to the American audience: there is too much fighting and not enough adventuring. Other critics have mentioned that class building becomes tedious and that the dual worlds are too overwhelming, both possible reasons against a US release. Dragon Quest VI was listed as #7 among the 10 Best Japanese Games Never Released in the U.S. by GamePro magazine in their May 2005 issue.
