= Dragon Quest VII =

2000 video game

Dragon Quest VII: Fragments of the Forgotten Past
- Box art of the original North American PlayStation release, titled Dragon Warrior VII
- Developers: Heartbeat; ArtePiazza (3DS, iOS, Android); HexaDrive (Reimagined)
- Publishers: WW: Enix (PlayStation); JP: Square Enix (3DS, iOS, Android, Reimagined); WW: Nintendo (3DS)
- Director: Manabu Yamana
- Producer: Yukinobu Chida (Note: Taichi Inuzuka produced the North American version)
- Designer: Yuji Horii
- Programmer: Manabu Yamana
- Artists: Akira Toriyama; Shintaro Majima
- Writers: Yuji Horii; Sachiko Sugimura; Fuminori Ishikawa; Kazunori Orio
- Composer: Koichi Sugiyama
- Series: Dragon Quest
- Engine: Unreal Engine 4 (Reimagined)
- Platforms: PlayStation, Nintendo 3DS, Android, iOS (Original); Nintendo Switch, Nintendo Switch 2, PlayStation 5, Xbox Series X/S, PC (Reimagined)
- Release: PlayStation: JP: August 26, 2000; NA: November 1, 2001; Nintendo 3DS: JP: February 7, 2013; NA: September 16, 2016; EU: September 16, 2016; AU: September 17, 2016; iOS, Android: JP: September 17, 2015; Nintendo Switch, Nintendo Switch 2, PlayStation 5, Xbox Series X/S, PC (Reimagined): WW: February 5, 2026
- Genre: Role-playing
- Mode: Single-player

Dragon Quest VII: Fragments of the Forgotten Past, known in Japan as Dragon Quest VII: Warriors of Eden, (Note: Japanese: ドラゴンクエストVII エデンの戦士たち, Hepburn: Doragon Kuesuto Sebun: Eden no Senshi-tachi) is a 2000 role-playing video game developed by Heartbeat and ArtePiazza, and published by Enix for the PlayStation. The game was produced by Yuji Horii, who has presided over the Dragon Quest series since its inception. Artwork and character designs were once again provided by Dragon Ball creator Akira Toriyama, the artist responsible for all previous Dragon Quest games. It was released in North America in 2001 under the title Dragon Warrior VII. The game received a remake on the Nintendo 3DS in Japan in 2013; the remake was released in English under the title Dragon Quest VII: Fragments of the Forgotten Past in 2016. A version of the game for Android and iOS was released in Japan in 2015. Another remake, entitled Dragon Quest VII Reimagined, was released for Nintendo Switch, Nintendo Switch 2, PlayStation 5, Xbox Series X/S, and PC on February 5, 2026.

The game follows the Hero and his friends as they discover secrets about the mysterious islands surrounding their home of Estard. Through some ancient ruins, they are transported to the pasts of various islands and must defeat evil in each new location. Game mechanics are largely unchanged from previous games in the series, although an extensive Class system allows players to customize their characters.

Dragon Quest VII: Fragments of the Forgotten Past is the seventh installment of the popular Dragon Quest series of role playing games, and is the successor to 1995's Dragon Quest VI for the Super Famicom. An immediate success upon release, Dragon Warrior VII's sales totalled 4.06 million by April 6, 2001, making it the best-selling PlayStation game in Japan, and is an Ultimate Hits title. It was the first main series Dragon Quest title to be released outside Japan since the release of Dragon Quest IV in North America in 1992, the last Dragon Quest title to be released in North America with the Dragon Warrior name, and the last Dragon Quest game outside of Japan to be published by Enix, before merging with Squaresoft in 2003 to form Square Enix.

== Gameplay ==
Dragon Quest VII is best known for its huge size. Without completing the game's side quests, a single game of Dragon Quest VII can take a hundred hours or more. In terms of gameplay, not much has changed from previous installments; battles are still fought in a turn-based mode from a first person perspective. Although non-battle sequences are rendered in 3D, battles themselves are still portrayed two dimensionally. The ability to talk with the party characters in and outside of battles was added to this game. They offer advice about battle strategies and plot points, or simply comment on how they feel at a given moment. There are four ways and means of locomotion: walking (striding), sailing a boat, flying a magic carpet, or using an object known as the skystone. Each of these can move across different terrain; however, some are more limited than others.

The main flow of the game is different from the other Dragon Quest games; instead of exploring one large world, the party goes to separate continents by placing stone shards into their appropriate pedestals in the Shrine of Mysteries. Once all of the missing shards are located and placed for a particular pedestal, the party is transported to the trapped location in the past. After solving whatever problems plague the location, the party then travels back to Estard, the beginning island. From there, they can travel via boat, carpet, or skystone to the modern version of the location they just saved. These saved lands appear on the main map, although the originals (from the past) can be revisited through the ruins.

Characters exploring the world, from the original PlayStation version

Like most of the other Dragon Quest games, this game has several mini-games to participate in. The Haven (Immigrant Town in the PlayStation release), similar to the one in Dragon Quest IV, lets the player recruit people from various towns. They then live in the town, which changes depending on the type of people living there (e.g. several merchants will bring more stores to the town). A prominent feature in most Dragon Quest games is the casino. Poker, slot machines, and Lucky Panel can all be played in Dragon Quest VII. The Excellence Grading Organization (previously the World Ranking Federation) allows the player to compete for the highest stats, like the Beauty Competition from Dragon Quest VI. The player can also catch monsters, although they are only displayed in the Monster Meadows, unlike in Dragon Quest V, where monsters fought in the party. Blueprints are found to add new environments to the park. In Reimagined, the Haven, the Excellence Grading Organization, Monster Meadows, and casino minigames except for Lucky Panel were removed, with the Battle Arena taking the casino's place. The Battle Arena allows players to compete in gauntlets against bosses and are graded based on how many turns they take to clear rounds and are given greater rewards for clearing them within a given number of turns. Paid downloadable content allows players to face the main antagonists from the Erdrick Trilogy of games (Dragon Quest, Dragon Quest II, and Dragon Quest III).

=== Class system ===
Dragon Quest VII uses a class system for learning abilities, similar to that of Dragon Quest VI. Some available classes include Warrior, Fighter, Cleric, Mage, Bard, Dancer, Jester, Thief, Idol, Pirate, Ranger, Gladiator, Paladin, Summoner, God Hand ("Champion" in the English versions), and Hero, some of which are unlocked by mastering other classes. The game also includes monster classes, which can be unlocked by using the appropriate monster heart or mastering pre-requisite monster classes. In Reimagined, the monster classes were replaced by a single advanced class called Monster Master and characters can belong to two classes at the same time for extra flexibility.

Characters generally stop learning character specific spells and skills around experience level 15; however, around this time in the game, players will reach Alltrades Abbey, where they can give their characters certain classes. Each non-monster class belongs to one of three tiers (Basic, Intermediate, and Advanced), while monster classes have more tiers. Characters gain levels in classes by fighting a certain number of battles, as opposed to gaining experience points. Characters learn different spells and skills when they reach another class level and their stats are affected by what class they are. Once a character reaches the 8th and final level of a class, it is considered "mastered", if a character masters certain classes, higher-tier classes will become available to them.

== Plot and setting ==
=== Story ===
The story begins when the father of the protagonist brings home a map fragment from a fishing trip; this map suggests to the protagonist and his friend that the world had, at some point in its past, had many continents, though now there is only the small island of Estard (エスタード, Esutādo). The two of them find a way to travel back to the past, when the continents still existed. The continents are facing serious problems that threaten their existence; the protagonist and his growing party work to resolve the problems, and when they do, the continents reappear in the present. When all the continents are finally restored, the party confronts the Demon King Orgodemir, who long ago defeated the Almighty (God in the Japanese script and the English PlayStation release) and is responsible for the continents' disappearance. After his initial defeat, Orgodemir returns in the present and poses as the Almighty to trick humanity into worshiping him, then seals the continents away again. The party summons the Four Great Spirits to expose Orgodemir, then travels to the Demon King's fortress where they destroy him for good in a final showdown. Afterwards, the party celebrates their victory with the allies they made during their journey and return to their ordinary lives.

=== Characters ===
- Hero (主人公, Shujinkō) — The Hero has no default name; as is traditional in the Dragon Quest series, the name is supplied by the player (however, he is called Arus in the official manga and was given the name Auster in the English versions). The Hero is a lifelong native of the town of Pilchard Bay on Estard Island and dreams of becoming a fisherman like his father. He is good friends with Maribel, daughter of the mayor of Pilchard Bay, and Kiefer, prince of Estard. In particular, he has a fondness for going out on impromptu "adventures" with Kiefer. It is one such adventure than begins the story of the game. In Reimagined, he is voiced by Kouki Osuzu in Japanese and Isaac Rouse in English.
- Kiefer (キーファ・グラン, Kīfa Guran) — Kiefer is a prince of Estard, and the presumptive heir to the throne. Far from anticipating his elevation to kingship, however, Kiefer seems to resent his royal blood, and is a source of endless worry and frustration to his family and advisors. Kiefer, for his part, spends much of his time in search of excitement and adventure, and has found a kindred spirit in the Hero, whom he considers his closest friend. On one trip to an ancient land, Kiefer falls in love, and remains behind. Upon returning to the present, the hero finds out that Kiefer became a famous guardian of the Roamer tribe. In Reimagined, Kiefer briefly reunites with the party with the option to participate in the final battle against Orgodemir before returning to the past, and is voiced by Mamoru Miyano in Japanese and Roly Botha in English. Kiefer is also the main character of the game Dragon Quest Monsters: Caravan Heart.
- Maribel Mayde (マリベル, Mariberu) — A friend of both the Hero and Kiefer, Maribel is the daughter of the mayor of Pilchard Bay. Unlike Kiefer, who has steadfastly refused to let his social status influence how he looks upon other people, Maribel tends to be a bit condescending, even bossy. Despite this, she has a kind, sentimental side and gets along well with her friends, and occasionally accompanies them on their adventuring, even if she sometimes has to pressure them into letting her tag along. In Reimagined, Maribel is voiced by Aoi Yūki in Japanese and Becky Wright in English.
- Ruff (ガボ, Gabo) — Although he appears normal, Ruff is actually a white wolf pup who was irrevocably turned into a boy. As such, he retains a number of obvious lupine characteristics, and can be somewhat animalistic at times. Ruff agrees to travel with the heroes hoping to protect his family, but remains with the group out of a sense of loyalty. In Reimagined, Ruff is voiced by Mutsumi Tamura in Japanese and Claire Corbett in English.
- Sir Mervyn (メルビン, Merubin) — A skilled paladin of generations past, Sir Mervyn fought on the side of God against the Demon Lord many years ago. Sir Mervyn excelled at his work, and distinguished himself in both skill and honor. As such, he was petrified in stone by God, so that, should the need arise, Sir Mervyn could be reawakened to once again take up the fight against evil. The party finds Sir Mervyn, who joins their adventure, although his age and unfamiliarity with the present day often leave other characters somewhat befuddled. In Reimagined, Sir Mervyn is voiced by Shigeru Chiba in Japanese and Nicholas Boulton in English.
- Aishe (アイラ, Aira) — Aishe is a descendant of Kiefer and the lead ritual dancer of the Roamer tribe, an ancient race of people charged with the stewardship of a temple necessary in the act of calling forth the Almighty. Raised and trained at swordsmanship, she is determined to fulfill her tribe's duty with the Almighty so they can finally move on. In Reimagined, Aishe is voiced by Asami Imai in Japanese and Amrita Acharia in English.

== Development and release ==
Dragon Quest VII was designed by series creator Yuji Horii and directed by Manabu Yamana. Shintaro Majima signed on as art director, while series veterans Akira Toriyama and Koichi Sugiyama designed the characters and composed the music respectively. The game was officially announced in 1996 and originally expected to be released for the Nintendo 64DD. On January 15, 1997, it was announced that development had been moved to the PlayStation. By the next day, both stock in Sony and Enix rose significantly in Japan. In turn, the move to the PlayStation was described as a "semi-crisis situation" for Nintendo, with Japanese stock analysts and industry observers losing faith in the long-term viability of the Nintendo 64 line. Enix cited the larger potential market and lower cost of manufacturing CDs as the reasons for the change of platform. By 2000, Dragon Quest VII was predicted to be so successful in Japan that it would "create a 50 billion yen effect on the Japanese economy", said research firm DIHS. Dragon Quest VII would go on to be released on August 26, 2000, and sold 4.06 million games in Japan, becoming one of the highest selling games of all time in Japan at the time of its release.

The game was delayed numerous times before its actual release. Work on the game was extended because the development staff wanted to perfect the game due to high expectations from the fans and because the team only consisted of about 35 people. Before its release, it was ranked as the most wanted game in Japan and Square, knowing about Dragon Quest VII's release, moved Final Fantasy IX to come out on a later date. Horii stated in an interview that the team focused more on puzzle solving than the game's story. Being the first game in the series to include 3D graphics, the team was also initially reluctant to include CG movies and cinematics due to letters written to Enix by fans fearing that doing so would change the overall feeling of the series.

The English language localization of Dragon Warrior VII began directly after the game's Japanese release. Enix of America was tasked with translating over 70,000 pages of text via 20 translators and 5 copy editors. No effort was made to edit or censor the context of the Japanese script. Weeks prior to the game's US release, Enix released new information about the game's different mechanics on their website weekly to introduce players to the game. Paul Handelman, president of Enix America, commented on the game that "All the talk this month about new systems with the latest technological wizardry doesn't diminish the fact that at the end of the day, compelling game play is what it's all about, and Dragon Warrior VII provides just that." Dragon Warrior VII was released in the US on November 1, 2001, and was the last game in the series to have Warrior in its title instead of Quest. In 2003, Square Enix registered the Dragon Quest trademark in the US, with the intent to retire the Dragon Warrior name. Soon after the game's release, developer Heartbeat went on hiatus. Justin Lucas, product manager of Enix America, commented on the hiatus, saying that the developer merely "worked their tails off on Dragon Warrior 7 and Dragon Warrior 4. They decided to take a sabbatical for a while and rest up", noting that it had nothing to do with the game's US sales.

The back of the Dragon Warrior VII manual in North America contained an advertisement for Dragon Warrior IV, an enhanced remake for the PlayStation of a Nintendo game of the same name. The localization was later cancelled, due to Heartbeat's closure.

=== 2013 remake ===
On October 30, 2012, Square Enix announced that they were remaking Dragon Quest VII exclusively for the Nintendo 3DS and that it would be released in Japan in February 2013. Later that day, Square Enix confirmed that the release date would be February 7, 2013 for Japan. Similarly to Dragon Quest IX, the game features visible enemy encounters instead of random encounters, unique backgrounds and enemies that have individual attack characteristics. The remake was originally not intended for a release outside of Japan, in part due to the sheer cost and time needed to localize the game's substantial content. After letters from core Dragon Quest fans in France to developers as well as to Square Enix and Nintendo executives, in addition to demand from fans online and from other sources, the decision was made to release the 3DS port worldwide. In the November 2015 Nintendo Direct, it was shown that Dragon Quest VII would be coming outside Japan in 2016, with the new subtitle Fragments of the Forgotten Past. The 3DS remake is an abridged version as much of the content from the original has been cut, such as the intro, to shorten the length of the game. The international release of the 3DS remake contained a completely retranslated script which followed the localization style of games since Square Enix's release of Dragon Quest VIII in 2005, including numerous name and terminology changes for characters from the original Dragon Warrior VII release. The Western release also replaced the orchestral score from the Japanese release, performed by the Tokyo Metropolitan Symphony Orchestra, with the synthesized MIDI soundtrack that had been used in the Japan-only iOS and Android versions of the game, released in 2015.

=== 2026 remake ===
On September 12, 2025, another remake for Dragon Quest VII, called Dragon Quest VII Reimagined, was announced. This version, according to producer Takeshi Ichikawa, was "re-built from the ground up". Graphically, Ichikawa wanted to take on a "new challenge", with environments in the game built to resemble dioramas. The battle system features the ability to "Moonlight" as a second class, "Vocational Perks" as new features for each class, and various quality-of-life additions. In addition, the story was streamlined to aid in pacing and accessibility. It was released on February 5, 2026, on Nintendo Switch, Nintendo Switch 2, PlayStation 5, Xbox Series X/S, and PC. A free demo was released on January 7, 2026.

== Other media ==
=== Soundtrack ===
As with nearly every Dragon Quest game, Koichi Sugiyama composed the musical score. As was done for Dragon Quest VI, the original sound version was bundled with the symphonic suite in a two-disc set called Dragon Quest VII: Eden no Senshitachi Symphonic Suite + OST. The entire first disc and the opening track of the second disc consists of the symphonic suite, while the rest of the second disc is the original sound version. The Symphonic Suite was released alone on Super Audio CD later that year, and re-released in 2009. A disc titled Dragon Quest VII: Eden no Senshitachi on Piano was also released, and contained 27 piano-arranged tracks. The Symphonic Suite was later re-recorded in 2006 along with the rest of the music from the series. An original soundtrack for the 3DS remake was released on March 19, 2014, and features the original recordings by the Tokyo Metropolitan Symphony Orchestra from the Japanese version of the remake.

=== Manga ===
The manga adaptation of Dragon Quest VII, titled Dragon Quest: Warriors of Eden (ドラゴンクエスト エデンの戦士たち), was serialized in Enix's Monthly Shōnen Gangan from 2001 to 2006. It was illustrated by Kamui Fujiwara, who previously worked on another manga for the franchise, Dragon Quest: The Mark of Erdick. Fourteen volumes were released between 2001 and 2006. In this adaptation, the hero is given the name "Arus". The manga follows the game story while adding in new characters and more detailed relationships, as the original hero was silent and a personality needed to be added for the comic version. In January 2026, Fujiwara began a sequel in Young Gangan titled Dragon Quest Eden.

== Reception ==
Reception

Aggregate scores
Aggregator	Score
GameRankings	PS: 81%
Metacritic	PS: 78/100; 3DS: 81/100
OpenCritic	89% recommend (Reimagined)

Review scores
Publication	Score
Famitsu	PS: 9/10, 10/10, 10/10, 9/10; 3DS: 9/10, 8/10, 9/10, 9/10
Game Informer	6.75/10
GameSpot	7.7/10
IGN	PS: 8.7/10; 3DS: 7.7/10
Next Generation	4/5

Dragon Warrior VII received both commercial and critical success in Japan. 3.57 million units were sold within 17 days of the game's release; the game established itself for having the largest annual shipment of any independently sold game for the original PlayStation. It was the best-selling PlayStation game of 2000 in the region, having sold more than 3.9 million copies by November. Shipments of Dragon Quest VII reached four million copies on January 5, 2001, and the game became the sixth best-seller video game of all platforms in Japan at that time. Worldwide, shipments of the game surpassed 4.1 million units as of March 2003. Dragon Warrior VII won the grand prize in Digital (Interactive) Art Division at the 4th Japan Media Arts Festival in 2000, where the game was praised for being "...engaging without depending on a high degree of realism..." and "...well refined and artfully executed." The game also won four awards from the 5th Japan Entertainment Software Awards by the Computer Entertainment Supplier's Association (CESA), including Best Prize, Scenario Prize, Sales Prize, and Popularity Prize. In 2006, the readers of Famitsu magazine voted Dragon Warrior VII the 9th best video game of all time.

Sales of the North American version of Dragon Warrior VII reached almost 200,000 copies according to The Magic Box, which was not nearly as stellar as its Japanese counterpart. Enix of America still expressed their satisfaction with the sales figures. Dragon Warrior VII met with mostly positive reviews from North American critics. IGN noted that all "100+ hours" of the game are enjoyable despite the dated visuals and clunky presentation. GameZone.com praised the game's concept and nostalgia factor and cited it as "what role-playing games were meant to be." They also noted the game's high difficulty, which, instead of making the game frustrating, they say, "make it that much more of an accomplishment when you complete a quest." IGN described the game's class system as "one of the best class systems seen outside a strategy RPG."

Other critics were not as pleased with Dragon Warrior VII. GameShark.com described the first two hours of the game as "some of the most boring hours you will ever play in a video game." XenGamers.com also pointed out that in order to play the game, the player needs "the patience of a rock". Game Informer even went as far as to say that "four million Japanese can be wrong", referring to the game's immense popularity in Japan. Because of the game's delay in being developed, its release was after the PlayStation 2's release, which created some negative feedback, particularly about the game's graphics. IGN commented on this, calling the game "a game that makes only a bare minimum of concessions to advancing technology, but more than makes up for this with its deep gameplay, massive quest, and sheer variety." GameSpot called the graphics "not good" and warned readers that if the "most rewarding things" they "got out of Final Fantasy VII were the full-motion video interludes, you definitely won't be wowed by anything you see in Dragon Warrior VII."

Eric Bratcher reviewed the PlayStation version of the game for Next Generation, rating it four stars out of five, and stated that "The harder-core you are, the more you'll love this definitely old-school RPG, but graphics hounds and those with short attention spans can sit this one out."

Sales of the Nintendo 3DS remake exceeded 800,000 copies the first week in Japan. As of March 17, 2013, the remake sold 1,174,077 copies. Famitsu rated the remake a 35/40, praising the new orchestrated score as well as the improved graphics, intro and first dungeon.
