= Dragon Quest: Your Story =

2019 anime film

- Theatrical release poster

Japanese name
- Kanji: ドラゴンクエスト ユア・ストーリー
Transcriptions
- Revised Hepburn: Doragon Kuesuto Yua Sutōrī
- Directed by: Takashi Yamazaki; Ryuichi Yagi; Makoto Hanafusa
- Screenplay by: Takashi Yamazaki
- Based on: Dragon Quest V by Square Enix
- Produced by: Shūji Abe
- Edited by: Ryuichi Yagi
- Music by: Koichi Sugiyama
- Production companies: Shirogumi; Robot Communications
- Distributed by: Toho
- Release date: August 2, 2019
- Running time: 102 minutes
- Country: Japan
- Language: Japanese
- Box office: ¥1.42 billion ($13 million)

Dragon Quest: Your Story (Japanese: ドラゴンクエスト ユア・ストーリー, Hepburn: Doragon Kuesuto Yua Sutōrī) (stylized as DRAGON QUEST: YOUR STOЯY) is a 2019 Japanese animated fantasy film based on the Dragon Quest series of video games, adapting the storyline of the 1992 video game Dragon Quest V. It was released in Japan by Toho on August 2, 2019, with an international release on Netflix on February 13, 2020. It was the final film composed by Koichi Sugiyama before his death in 2021.

== Plot ==
Gotha's Queen Mada is kidnapped by monsters, and her husband King Pankraz travels the world trying to rescue her, bringing along their young son Luca. Luca meets Bianca, and they acquire both a Golden Orb and a sabrecat cub he names Purrcy. Coburg's Prince Harry also gets abducted by the monsters, and Pankraz and Luca pursue them. But Bishop Ladja kills Pankraz and enslaves Luca and Harry.

After ten years as slaves, the boys escape. Harry returns to Coburg and promises to repay Luca for Pankraz's rescue attempt. Luca reunites with a fully-grown Purrcy and his father's retainer Sancho, and is joined by a slime he names Gootrude. Ladja is trying to free Grandmaster Nimzo, who is trapped in the Demon World. He abducted Mada because her Zenithian lineage is needed to open the portal. But there's a legend that a hero is destined to seal the portal, and Pankraz believed Luca was the Legendary Hero.

Luca needs the Zenithian Sword, which the wealthy nobleman Rodrigo Briscoletti has in the town of Mostroferrato. But the town is terrorized by Bjørn the Behemoose, who stole the sword, with Briscoletti offering the hand of his daughter Nera to whoever defeats Bjørn. Luca manages to defeat Bjørn with Bianca's help. He spares the monster when it submits, as indicated by its eyes fading from the orange color his enemies have. Luca is unable to use the sword, thus proving that he isn't the Legendary Hero. But he's betrothed to Nera until an encounter with a witch (Nera in disguise) makes him realize that Bianca is the one he really loves.

Luca and Bianca get married and have a son named Alus. Shortly after, they are attacked by monsters, and Ladja turns Luca and Bianca to stone. Eight years later Luca's son Alus uses the Stolos' staff to revive him, and it's revealed that Alus is the true Legendary Hero. The group seek the help of Dr. Agon, who would be able to transform into the Zenith Dragon if he had the Golden Orb that Luca found as a child. The orb is broken, but Agon recognizes it as a fake. He suggests that Luca gets help from the fairies, who give him a fake orb, and send him back in time to switch it with the real Golden Orb that he had as a child.

Joined by Bjørn and Harry's army, the heroes revive Bianca and confront Ladja. But as he dies, Ladja manages to open the portal. Alus seals it, but reality is suddenly distorted by a mysterious being. He deletes their surroundings, and explains that he is a computer virus, and Luca is playing a virtual simulation of Dragon Quest V. Gootrude then reveals himself to be the game's anti-virus program, and gives Luca the means of destroying the virus and restoring the game (in the form of Erdrick's sword).

The game ends when Luca's party arrive at Gotha, with Luca intending to keep this version of the game in his heart. Though when watching the fireworks from Gotha, Bianca hits him playfully, and Luca notes that he actually felt the pain.

== Cast ==
Character	Japanese voice actor	English dubbing actor
Luca Gotha (The Hero)	Takeru Satoh	Yuri Lowenthal, Julian Lerner (young)
Bianca Whitaker (Bianca)	Kasumi Arimura	Stephanie Sheh
Alus Gotha (The Hero's Son)		Hudson Loverro
Nera Briscoletti (Flora)	Haru	Xanthe Huynh
Prince Harry (Henry)	Kentaro Sakaguchi	Zeno Robinson, Elijah Rayman (young)
Pankraz Gotha (Papasu)	Takayuki Yamada	Parker Simmons
Sancho	Kendo Kobayashi	Shaun Conde
Dr. Agon (Pusan)/Zenith Dragon	Ken Yasuda	Neil Kaplan
Rodrigo Briscoletti (Ludman)	Suzuki Matsuo	Frank Todaro
Gootrude (Surarin)	Kōichi Yamadera	Steve Blum
Mada (Martha)	Chikako Kaku	Cissy Jones
Bjørn the Behemoose	Arata Furuta	Jacob Craner
Bishop Ladja (Gema)	Kōtarō Yoshida	Jason Marnocha
Kon the Knight (Jami)		Steve Blum
Slon the Rook (Gonze)		Trevor Devall Jeff Garlin
Grandmaster Nimzo (Mildrath)	Arata Iura	Paul Guyet

== Production ==
On February 13, 2019, Dragon Quest creator Yuji Horii appeared on the Nippon TV show News Zero and announced that a 3D CG anime film based on the franchise would be released on August 2. Titled Dragon Quest: Your Story, it adapts the 1992 video game Dragon Quest V.

Written and directed by Takashi Yamazaki, it is also directed by Ryuichi Yagi and Makoto Hanafusa. Some of the staff, including Yamazaki and Yagi, previously worked together on the 2014 3D CG anime film Stand by Me Doraemon. Horii supervised the film and it uses Koichi Sugiyama's original music from the games, performed by the Tokyo Metropolitan Symphony Orchestra.

For the film, the dialogue was recorded first and the characters' mouths and expressions were created to match it which is extremely unusual for an anime. Describing the animation, Yamazaki said that it was done at his studio by different animators who created "different forms" of Akira Toriyama's original designs from the video games. The actors recorded their dialogue twice, once two years prior and then with the finished animation.

The first trailer was released on April 4. At the same time, 13 cast members were announced, including Takeru Satoh as the protagonist Ruka and Kasumi Arimura as Bianca. Several additional cast members were announced on May 14. A second trailer and the film's poster were released on June 19.

== Lawsuit ==
In December 2019, Dragon Quest V novelist Saori Kumi filed a lawsuit against the producers of the film, claiming that the characters names she came up with in the novel were being used in the film without permission.

== Release ==
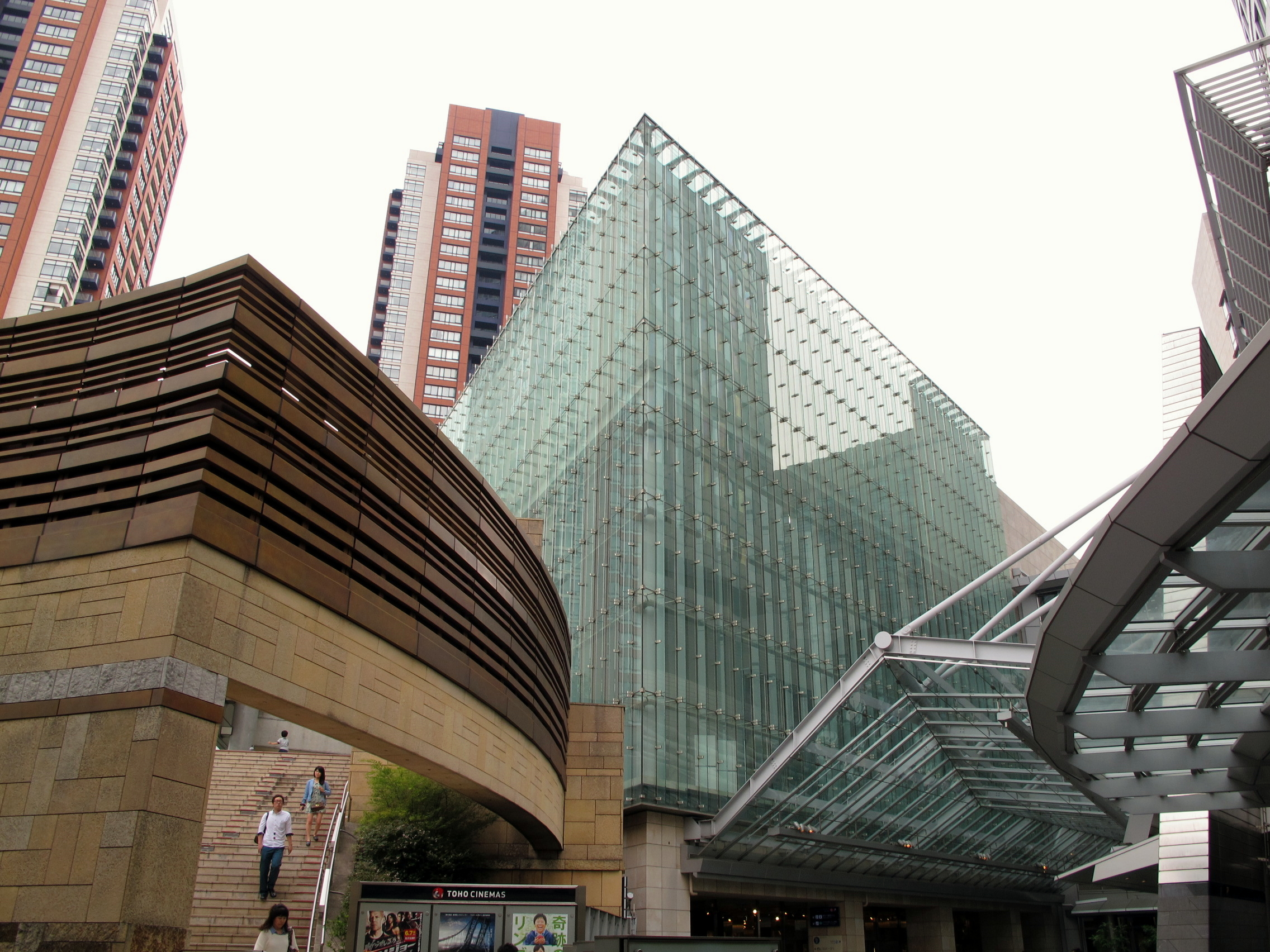
Toho Cinemas Roppongi Hills hosted the world premiere of the film.

A premiere of the film was shown at Toho Cinemas in Tokyo on July 16, 2019. It was later released in cinemas nationwide on August 2, 2019.

The film premiered internationally on Netflix on February 13, 2020.

== Reception ==
Following the release of the first trailer, some Japanese fans negatively criticized the decision to hire famous live-action actors to voice the characters instead of professional voice actors. Much of the negative criticism was also directed at the character designs, which did not use Akira Toriyama's signature art style of the series.

Dragon Quest: Your Story grossed ¥1.42 billion ($9 million) during its theatrical run in Japan. It was one of the top 25 highest-grossing Japanese films of 2019.
