= List of Square Enix video games =

Video games by developer/publisher

Square Enix logo

Square Enix is a Japanese video game development and publishing company formed from the merger of video game developer Square and publisher Enix on April 1, 2003. The company is best known for its role-playing video game franchises, which include the Final Fantasy, Dragon Quest, and Kingdom Hearts series. Of its intellectual properties (IPs), the Final Fantasy franchise is the best-selling, with total worldwide sales of over 173 million units. The Dragon Quest series has sold over 85 million units worldwide while the Kingdom Hearts series has shipped over 36 million copies worldwide. Since its inception, the company has developed or published hundreds of titles in various video game franchises on numerous gaming systems.

Square Enix acquired Taito in September 2005, which operates as a subsidiary, and the parent company Eidos plc (formerly SCi Entertainment) of British publisher Eidos Interactive in April 2009, which has been merged with Square Enix's European distribution wing and renamed as Square Enix Europe. This list includes some retail games where Square Enix was the developer or primary publisher after its formation (excluding games distributed in Japan by Square Enix Company Limited). As well as some games primarily published or distributed by the group's North American branch, Square Enix Incorporated. However, it does not include games published by subsidiary Taito or primarily by the group's European branch, Square Enix Limited.

- For games released before the merger, see List of Square video games and List of Enix games.
- For mobile games released by the company, see List of Square Enix mobile games.
- For game franchises, see List of Square Enix video game franchises.
- For games released by Taito, both before and after the acquisition, see List of Taito games
- For games primarily published by the group's European branch see List of Square Enix Europe games.

== Console and PC games ==
List of games
Title	System	Original release date	Developer(s)	JP	NA	PAL	Ref(s)
Bakusou Yankee Damashii	Windows	May 23, 2003	Atelier Double	Yes			
Hanjuku Hero Tai 3D	PlayStation 2	June 26, 2003	Square Enix	Yes			
All Star Pro-Wrestling III	PlayStation 2	August 7, 2003	Square Enix	Yes			
Final Fantasy Crystal Chronicles	GameCube	August 8, 2003	Square Enix	Yes	Yes	Yes	
Final Fantasy Crystal Chronicles	Nintendo Switch	August 27, 2020	Square Enix	Yes	Yes	Yes	
Final Fantasy Crystal Chronicles	PlayStation 4	August 27, 2020	Square Enix	Yes	Yes	Yes	
Sword of Mana	Game Boy Advance	August 29, 2003	Brownie Brown	Yes	Yes	Yes	
Drakengard	PlayStation 2	September 11, 2003	Cavia	Yes	Yes	Yes	
Kenshin Dragon Quest: Yomigaerishi Densetsu no Ken	Handheld TV	September 19, 2003	Square Enix	Yes			
The King of Automobile Companies	Web browser	October 1, 2003	thinkArts	Yes			
Front Mission	PlayStation	October 23, 2003	Square Enix	Yes			
Front Mission	Nintendo DS	March 22, 2007	Square Enix	Yes	Yes		
Slime MoriMori Dragon Quest: Shōgeki no Shippo Dan	Game Boy Advance	November 14, 2003	Tose	Yes			
Final Fantasy X-2 (Note: Final Fantasy X-2 was published in Japan by Square.)	PlayStation 2	November 18, 2003	Square Enix	Yes	Yes	Yes	
Front Mission 4	PlayStation 2	December 18, 2003	Square Enix	Yes	Yes		
Fullmetal Alchemist and the Broken Angel	PlayStation 2	December 25, 2003	Racjin	Yes	Yes		
Dragon Quest V	PlayStation 2	March 25, 2004	ArtePiazza / Matrix Software	Yes			
Junk Metal	Windows	April 12, 2004	Metro / BrainNavi	Yes			
Dragon Quest Characters: Torneko no Daibōken 3 Advance	Game Boy Advance	June 24, 2004	Chunsoft / Rakish	Yes			
Final Fantasy I & II: Dawn of Souls	Game Boy Advance	July 29, 2004	Tose	Yes	Yes	Yes	
Fullmetal Alchemist 2: Curse of the Crimson Elixir	PlayStation 2	September 22, 2004	Racjin	Yes	Yes		
Kingdom Hearts: Chain of Memories	Game Boy Advance	November 11, 2004	Square Enix / Jupiter	Yes	Yes	Yes	
Dragon Quest VIII	PlayStation 2	November 27, 2004	Level-5	Yes	Yes	Yes	
Dragon Quest VIII	Nintendo 3DS	August 27, 2015	Square Enix	Yes	Yes	Yes	
Dragon Quest & Final Fantasy in Itadaki Street Special	PlayStation 2	December 22, 2004	Square Enix	Yes			
Radiata Stories	PlayStation 2	January 27, 2005	tri-Ace	Yes	Yes		
Musashi: Samurai Legend	PlayStation 2	March 15, 2005	Square Enix	Yes	Yes	Yes	
Egg Monster Hero	Nintendo DS	March 24, 2005	Neverland	Yes			
Romancing SaGa	PlayStation 2	April 21, 2005	Square Enix	Yes	Yes	Yes	
Romancing SaGa	PlayStation 4	December 1, 2022	Square Enix	Yes	Yes	Yes	
Romancing SaGa	PlayStation 5	December 1, 2022	Square Enix	Yes	Yes	Yes	
Romancing SaGa	Windows	December 1, 2022	Square Enix	Yes	Yes	Yes	
Romancing SaGa	Nintendo Switch	December 1, 2022	Square Enix	Yes	Yes	Yes	
Front Mission: Online	PlayStation 2	May 12, 2005	Square Enix	Yes			
Front Mission: Online	Windows	December 8, 2005	Square Enix	Yes			
Hanjuku Hero 4: 7-Jin no Hanjuku Hero	PlayStation 2	May 26, 2005	Square Enix	Yes			
Drakengard 2	PlayStation 2	June 16, 2005	Cavia	Yes	Yes	Yes	
Fullmetal Alchemist 3: Kami o Tsugu Shōjo	PlayStation 2	July 21, 2005	Racjin	Yes			
Grandia III	PlayStation 2	August 4, 2005	Game Arts	Yes	Yes		
Heavy Metal Thunder	PlayStation 2	September 1, 2005	Media.Vision	Yes			
Code Age Commanders	PlayStation 2	October 13, 2005	Square Enix	Yes			
Dragon Quest Heroes: Rocket Slime	Nintendo DS	December 1, 2005	Tose	Yes	Yes		
Final Fantasy IV Advance	Game Boy Advance	December 15, 2005	Tose	Yes	Yes	Yes	
Kingdom Hearts II	PlayStation 2	December 22, 2005	Square Enix	Yes	Yes	Yes	
Front Mission 5: Scars of the War	PlayStation 2	December 29, 2005	Square Enix	Yes			
Dirge of Cerberus: Final Fantasy VII	PlayStation 2	January 26, 2006	Square Enix	Yes	Yes	Yes	
Fantasy Earth: Zero	Windows	February 23, 2006	Fenix Soft	Yes	Yes		
Children of Mana	Nintendo DS	March 2, 2006	Nex Entertainment	Yes	Yes	Yes	
Valkyrie Profile: Lenneth	PlayStation Portable	March 2, 2006	Tose	Yes	Yes	Yes	
Valkyrie Profile: Lenneth	PlayStation 4	September 29, 2022	Tose	Yes	Yes	Yes	
Valkyrie Profile: Lenneth	PlayStation 5	September 29, 2022	Tose	Yes	Yes	Yes	
Final Fantasy XII	PlayStation 2	March 16, 2006	Square Enix	Yes	Yes	Yes	
Final Fantasy XI	Xbox 360	April 18, 2006	Square Enix	Yes	Yes	Yes	
Dragon Quest: Young Yangus and the Mystery Dungeon	PlayStation 2	April 20, 2006	Cavia	Yes			
Dragon Quest & Final Fantasy in Itadaki Street Portable	PlayStation Portable	May 25, 2006	Think Garage	Yes			
Valkyrie Profile 2: Silmeria	PlayStation 2	June 22, 2006	tri-Ace	Yes	Yes	Yes	
Mario Hoops 3-on-3 (Note: Mario Hoops was released in Europe as Mario Slam Basketball.)	Nintendo DS	July 27, 2006	Square Enix	Yes	Yes	Yes	
Final Fantasy III	Nintendo DS	August 24, 2006	Matrix Software	Yes	Yes	Yes	
Final Fantasy III	PlayStation Portable	September 20, 2012	Square Enix	Yes	Yes	Yes	
Final Fantasy III	Ouya	March 29, 2013	Square Enix	Yes	Yes	Yes	
Project Sylpheed	Xbox 360	September 28, 2006	Game Arts / SETA	Yes	Yes	Yes	
Final Fantasy V Advance	Game Boy Advance	October 12, 2006	Tose	Yes	Yes	Yes	
Final Fantasy VI Advance	Game Boy Advance	November 30, 2006	Tose	Yes	Yes	Yes	
Final Fantasy Fables: Chocobo Tales	Nintendo DS	December 14, 2006	h.a.n.d.	Yes	Yes	Yes	
Dawn of Mana	PlayStation 2	December 21, 2006	Square Enix	Yes	Yes		
Dragon Quest Monsters: Joker	Nintendo DS	December 28, 2006	Tose	Yes	Yes	Yes	
Heroes of Mana	Nintendo DS	March 8, 2007	Brownie Brown	Yes	Yes	Yes	
Kingdom Hearts II Final Mix+	PlayStation 2	March 29, 2007	Square Enix	Yes			
Concerto Gate	Windows	April 6, 2007	ponsbic	Yes			
Final Fantasy	PlayStation Portable	April 19, 2007	Tose	Yes	Yes	Yes	
Final Fantasy XII: Revenant Wings	Nintendo DS	April 26, 2007	Think & Feel	Yes	Yes	Yes	
Final Fantasy Tactics: The War of the Lions	PlayStation Portable	May 10, 2007	Square Enix	Yes	Yes	Yes	
Call of Duty 4: Modern Warfare (Japan release)	PlayStation 3, Xbox 360	May 26, 2007	Infinity Ward	Yes			
Dragon Quest: Monster Battle Road	Arcade	June 2007	Rocket Studio	Yes			
Final Fantasy II	PlayStation Portable	June 7, 2007	Tose	Yes	Yes	Yes	
Itadaki Street DS	Nintendo DS	June 21, 2007	Think Garage	Yes			
Dragon Quest Swords: The Masked Queen and the Tower of Mirrors	Wii	July 12, 2007	Genius Sonority / Eighting	Yes	Yes	Yes	
The World Ends with You	Nintendo DS	July 27, 2007	Square Enix / Jupiter	Yes	Yes	Yes	
Final Fantasy XII International Zodiac Job System	PlayStation 2	August 9, 2007	Square Enix	Yes			
Final Fantasy Crystal Chronicles: Ring of Fates	Nintendo DS	August 23, 2007	Square Enix	Yes	Yes	Yes	
Crisis Core: Final Fantasy VII	PlayStation Portable	September 13, 2007	Square Enix	Yes	Yes	Yes	
Final Fantasy Tactics A2: Grimoire of the Rift	Nintendo DS	October 25, 2007	Square Enix	Yes	Yes	Yes	
Yosumin DS	Nintendo DS	November 8, 2007	Square Enix	Yes			
Dragon Quest IV (Note: Dragon Quest IV: Chapters of the Chosen was released in Australia and Europe as Dragon Quest: The Chapters of the Chosen.)	Nintendo DS	November 22, 2007	ArtePiazza / Cattle Call	Yes	Yes	Yes	
Final Fantasy Fables: Chocobo's Dungeon	Wii	December 13, 2007	h.a.n.d.	Yes	Yes	Yes	
Final Fantasy IV	Nintendo DS	December 20, 2007	Matrix Software	Yes	Yes	Yes	
Star Ocean: First Departure	PlayStation Portable	December 27, 2007	Tose	Yes	Yes	Yes	
Star Ocean: First Departure	Nintendo Switch	December 5, 2019	Tose	Yes	Yes	Yes	
Star Ocean: First Departure	PlayStation 4	December 5, 2019	Tose	Yes	Yes	Yes	
Final Fantasy Crystal Chronicles: My Life as a King	Wii	March 25, 2008	Square Enix	Yes	Yes	Yes	
Star Ocean: Second Evolution	PlayStation Portable	April 2, 2008	Tose	Yes	Yes	Yes	
Star Ocean: Second Evolution	PlayStation 4	October 28, 2015	Tose	Yes			
Star Ocean: Second Evolution	PlayStation Vita	October 28, 2015	Tose	Yes			
Star Ocean: Second Evolution	PlayStation 3	December 24, 2015	Tose	Yes			
Front Mission 2089: Border of Madness	Nintendo DS	May 29, 2008	h.a.n.d.	Yes			
Lord of Vermilion	Arcade	June 17, 2008	Think Garage	Yes			
Nanashi no Game	Nintendo DS	July 3, 2008	Epics	Yes			
Dragon Quest V (Note: Dragon Quest V: Hand of the Heavenly Bride was released in Europe as Dragon Quest: The Hand of the Heavenly Bride.)	Nintendo DS	July 17, 2008	ArtePiazza	Yes	Yes	Yes	
Sigma Harmonics	Nintendo DS	August 21, 2008	Think Garage	Yes			
Infinite Undiscovery	Xbox 360	September 2, 2008	tri-Ace	Yes	Yes	Yes	
Soul Eater: Monotone Princess	Wii	September 25, 2008	Square Enix	Yes			
Snoopy DS: Let's Go Meet Snoopy and His Friends!	Nintendo DS	October 9, 2008	Square Enix	Yes			
Cid to Chocobo no Fushigi na Dungeon Toki Wasure no Meikyū DS+	Nintendo DS	October 30, 2008	h.a.n.d.	Yes			
Valkyrie Profile: Covenant of the Plume	Nintendo DS	November 1, 2008	tri-Ace	Yes	Yes	Yes	
Pingu's Wonderful Carnival!	Nintendo DS	November 6, 2008	Square Enix	Yes			
Chrono Trigger	Nintendo DS	November 20, 2008	Tose	Yes	Yes	Yes	
Chrono Trigger	Windows	February 27, 2018	Tose	Yes	Yes	Yes	
The Last Remnant	Xbox 360	November 20, 2008	Square Enix	Yes	Yes	Yes	
The Last Remnant	Windows	March 20, 2009	Square Enix	Yes	Yes	Yes	
The Last Remnant	PlayStation 4	December 6, 2018	Square Enix	Yes	Yes	Yes	
The Last Remnant	Nintendo Switch	June 10, 2019	Square Enix	Yes	Yes	Yes	
Chocobo to Mahō no Ehon: Majō to Shōjo to Gonin no Yūsha	Nintendo DS	December 11, 2008	h.a.n.d.	Yes			
Dissidia Final Fantasy	PlayStation Portable	December 18, 2008	Square Enix	Yes	Yes	Yes	
LostWinds	Wii	December 24, 2008	Frontier Developments	Yes	Yes	Yes	
Crystal Defenders	Wii	January 27, 2009	Square Enix	Yes	Yes	Yes	
Crystal Defenders	PlayStation 3	March 11, 2009	Square Enix	Yes	Yes	Yes	
Crystal Defenders	Xbox 360	March 11, 2009	Square Enix	Yes	Yes	Yes	
Crystal Defenders	PlayStation Portable	October 29, 2009	Square Enix	Yes	Yes	Yes	
Final Fantasy Crystal Chronicles: Echoes of Time	Nintendo DS	January 29, 2009	Square Enix	Yes	Yes	Yes	
Final Fantasy Crystal Chronicles: Echoes of Time	Wii	January 29, 2009	Square Enix	Yes	Yes	Yes	
Star Ocean: The Last Hope	Xbox 360	February 19, 2009	tri-Ace	Yes	Yes	Yes	
Kuroshitsuji: Phantom & Ghost	Nintendo DS	March 19, 2009	Square Enix	Yes			
Major Minor's Majestic March	Wii	April 23, 2009	NanaOn-Sha	Yes			
Kingdom Hearts 358/2 Days	Nintendo DS	May 30, 2009	h.a.n.d.	Yes	Yes	Yes	
Final Fantasy IV: The After Years	Wii	June 1, 2009	Matrix Software	Yes	Yes	Yes	
Dragon Quest Wars	Nintendo DS	June 24, 2009	Intelligent Systems	Yes	Yes	Yes	
Final Fantasy Crystal Chronicles: My Life as a Darklord	Wii	June 30, 2009	Square Enix	Yes	Yes	Yes	
Dragon Quest IX	Nintendo DS	July 11, 2009	Level-5	Yes	Yes	Yes	
Blood of Bahamut	Nintendo DS	August 6, 2009	Think & Feel	Yes			
Fullmetal Alchemist: Prince of the Dawn	Wii	August 13, 2009	Eighting	Yes			
Nanashi no Game Me	Nintendo DS	August 27, 2009	Epics	Yes			
SaGa 2: Hihou Densetsu	Nintendo DS	September 17, 2009	Racjin	Yes			
Dragon Quest: Monster Battle Road II Legends	Arcade	September 11, 2009	Rocket Studio	Yes			
Order of War	Microsoft Windows	September 18, 2009	Wargaming		Yes	Yes	
Lord of Vermilion II	Arcade	September 30, 2009	Square Enix	Yes			
Thexder Neo	PlayStation Portable	October 1, 2009	Zereo	Yes	Yes	Yes	
Thexder Neo	PlayStation 3	January 28, 2010	Zereo	Yes	Yes	Yes	
Final Fantasy: The 4 Heroes of Light	Nintendo DS	October 29, 2009	Matrix Software	Yes	Yes	Yes	
Dissidia: Final Fantasy Universal Tuning	PlayStation Portable	November 1, 2009	Square Enix	Yes			
Final Fantasy Crystal Chronicles: The Crystal Bearers	Wii	November 12, 2009	Square Enix	Yes	Yes	Yes	
Gyromancer	Microsoft Windows	November 18, 2009	Square Enix / PopCap Games	Yes	Yes	Yes	
Gyromancer	Xbox 360	November 18, 2009	Square Enix / PopCap Games	Yes	Yes	Yes	
Cross Treasures	Nintendo DS	December 3, 2009	syn Sophia	Yes			
Fullmetal Alchemist: Daughter of the Dusk	Wii	December 10, 2009	Eighting	Yes			
Final Fantasy XIII	PlayStation 3	December 17, 2009	Square Enix	Yes	Yes	Yes	
Final Fantasy XIII	Xbox 360	March 9, 2010	Square Enix	Yes	Yes	Yes	
Final Fantasy XIII	Windows	October 9, 2014	Square Enix	Yes	Yes	Yes	
Final Fantasy XIII	Xbox One	November 13, 2018	Square Enix	Yes	Yes	Yes	
0 Day Attack on Earth	Xbox 360	December 23, 2009	Gulti	Yes	Yes	Yes	
Kingdom Hearts Birth by Sleep	PlayStation Portable	January 9, 2010	Square Enix	Yes	Yes	Yes	
Death By Cube	Xbox 360	January 20, 2010	Premium Agency	Yes	Yes		
Dragon Quest VI	Nintendo DS	January 28, 2010	ArtePiazza	Yes	Yes	Yes	
Star Ocean: The Last Hope International	PlayStation 3	February 4, 2010	tri-Ace	Yes	Yes	Yes	
Lufia: Curse of the Sinistrals	Nintendo DS	February 25, 2010	Neverland	Yes	Yes		
Oyako de Asobo: Miffy no Omocha Bako	Wii	March 18, 2010	h.a.n.d.	Yes			
Nier	PlayStation 3	April 22, 2010	Cavia	Yes	Yes	Yes	
Nier	Xbox 360	April 22, 2010	Cavia	Yes	Yes	Yes	
Nier	Windows	April 22, 2021	Toylogic	Yes	Yes	Yes	
Nier	PlayStation 4	April 22, 2021	Toylogic	Yes	Yes	Yes	
Nier	Xbox One	April 22, 2021	Toylogic	Yes	Yes	Yes	
Dragon Quest Monsters: Joker 2	Nintendo DS	April 28, 2010	Tose	Yes	Yes	Yes	
The Tales of Bearsworth Manor	Wii	June 21, 2010	Square Enix	Yes	Yes	Yes	
Dragon Quest: Monster Battle Road Victory	Wii	July 15, 2010	Rocket Studio / Eighting	Yes			
Densha de Go! Tokubetsu-hen: Fukkatsu Shouwa no Yamatesen	Nintendo DS	July 22, 2010	Square Enix	Yes			
Front Mission Evolved	Windows	September 16, 2010	Double Helix Games	Yes	Yes	Yes	
Front Mission Evolved	PlayStation 3	September 16, 2010	Double Helix Games	Yes	Yes	Yes	
Front Mission Evolved	Xbox 360	September 16, 2010	Double Helix Games	Yes	Yes	Yes	
Final Fantasy XIV	Windows	September 22, 2010	Square Enix	Yes	Yes	Yes	
Kingdom Hearts Re:coded	Nintendo DS	October 7, 2010	h.a.n.d.	Yes	Yes	Yes	
Lord of Arcana	PlayStation Portable	October 14, 2010	Access Games	Yes	Yes	Yes	
Tactics Ogre: Let Us Cling Together	PlayStation Portable	November 11, 2010	Square Enix	Yes	Yes	Yes	
Mario Sports Mix	Wii	November 25, 2010	Square Enix	Yes	Yes	Yes	
The 3rd Birthday	PlayStation Portable	December 22, 2010	Square Enix / HexaDrive	Yes	Yes	Yes	
SaGa 3: Jikuu no Hasha	Nintendo DS	January 6, 2011	Racjin	Yes			
MindJack	PlayStation 3	January 18, 2011	feelplus	Yes	Yes	Yes	
MindJack	Xbox 360	January 18, 2011	feelplus	Yes	Yes	Yes	
Kingdom Hearts Birth by Sleep Final Mix	PlayStation Portable	January 20, 2011	Square Enix	Yes			
Bust-a-Move Universe	Nintendo 3DS	February 26, 2011	Arika	Yes	Yes	Yes	
Dissidia 012 Final Fantasy	PlayStation Portable	March 3, 2011	Square Enix	Yes	Yes	Yes	
Final Fantasy IV: The Complete Collection	PlayStation Portable	March 24, 2011	Square Enix	Yes	Yes	Yes	
Ikenie no Yoru	Wii	March 24, 2011	Square Enix / Marvelous Entertainment	Yes			
Moon Diver	PlayStation 3	March 29, 2011	feelplus	Yes	Yes	Yes	
Moon Diver	Xbox 360	May 4, 2011	feelplus	Yes	Yes	Yes	
Dungeon Siege III	Microsoft Windows	June 17, 2011	Obsidian Entertainment	Yes	Yes	Yes	
Dungeon Siege III	PlayStation 3	June 17, 2011	Obsidian Entertainment	Yes	Yes	Yes	
Dungeon Siege III	Xbox 360	June 17, 2011	Obsidian Entertainment	Yes	Yes	Yes	
Dragon Quest Monsters: Joker 2 Professional	Nintendo DS	March 31, 2011	Tose	Yes			
Final Fantasy Type-0	PlayStation Portable	October 27, 2011	Square Enix	Yes			
Slime Mori Mori Dragon Quest 3	Nintendo 3DS	November 2, 2011	Tose	Yes			
Fortune Street	Wii	December 1, 2011	Think Garage	Yes	Yes	Yes	
Final Fantasy XIII-2	PlayStation 3	December 15, 2011	Square Enix	Yes	Yes	Yes	
Final Fantasy XIII-2	Xbox 360	December 15, 2011	Square Enix	Yes	Yes	Yes	
Final Fantasy XIII-2	Windows	December 11, 2014	Square Enix	Yes	Yes	Yes	
Final Fantasy XIII-2	Xbox One	November 13, 2018	Square Enix	Yes	Yes	Yes	
Army Corps of Hell	PlayStation Vita	December 17, 2011	Entersphere	Yes	Yes	Yes	
Lord of Apocalypse	PlayStation Portable	December 17, 2011	Access Games	Yes			
Lord of Apocalypse	PlayStation Vita	December 17, 2011	Access Games	Yes			
Scarygirl	Xbox 360	January 18, 2012	TikGames		Yes	Yes	
Scarygirl	PlayStation 3	January 24, 2012	TikGames		Yes	Yes	
Theatrhythm Final Fantasy	Nintendo 3DS	February 16, 2012	indieszero	Yes	Yes	Yes	
Wakfu	OS X	February 29, 2012	Ankama Games		Yes	Yes	
Wakfu	Microsoft Windows	February 29, 2012	Ankama Games		Yes	Yes	
Kingdom Hearts 3D: Dream Drop Distance	Nintendo 3DS	March 29, 2012	Square Enix	Yes	Yes	Yes	
Dragon Quest Monsters: Terry's Wonderland 3D	Nintendo 3DS	May 31, 2012	Tose	Yes			
Quantum Conundrum	Microsoft Windows	June 21, 2012	Airtight Games	Yes	Yes	Yes	
Quantum Conundrum	PlayStation 3	July 27, 2012	Airtight Games	Yes	Yes	Yes	
Quantum Conundrum	Xbox 360	July 27, 2012	Airtight Games	Yes	Yes	Yes	
Chousoku Henkei Gyrozetter	Arcade	June 21, 2012	Rocket Studio	Yes			
Gunslinger Stratos	Arcade	July 12, 2012	Byking	Yes			
Dragon Quest X	Wii	August 2, 2012	Square Enix	Yes			
Dragon Quest X	Wii U	March 30, 2013	Square Enix	Yes			
Dragon Quest X	Windows	September 26, 2013	Square Enix	Yes			
Dragon Quest X	PlayStation 4	August 17, 2017	Square Enix	Yes			
Dragon Quest X	Nintendo Switch	September 21, 2017	Square Enix	Yes			
Final Fantasy VII	Windows	August 14, 2012	Square Enix	Yes	Yes	Yes	
Final Fantasy VII	Nintendo Switch	March 26, 2019	Square Enix	Yes	Yes	Yes	
Final Fantasy VII	Xbox One	March 26, 2019	Square Enix	Yes	Yes	Yes	
Bravely Default	Nintendo 3DS	October 11, 2012	Silicon Studio	Yes	Yes	Yes	
Bravely Default	Nintendo Switch 2	June 5, 2025	Cattle Call	Yes	Yes	Yes	
Dragon Quest VII	Nintendo 3DS	February 7, 2013	ArtePiazza	Yes	Yes	Yes	
Kingdom Hearts HD 1.5 Remix	PlayStation 3	March 14, 2013	Square Enix	Yes	Yes	Yes	
Kingdom Hearts HD 1.5 Remix	PlayStation 4	March 9, 2017	Square Enix	Yes	Yes	Yes	
Kingdom Hearts HD 1.5 Remix	Xbox One	February 18, 2020	Square Enix	Yes	Yes	Yes	
Kingdom Hearts HD 1.5 Remix	Windows	March 30, 2021	Square Enix	Yes	Yes	Yes	
Kingdom Hearts HD 1.5 Remix	PlayStation 5	October 2, 2026	Square Enix	Yes	Yes	Yes	
Kingdom Hearts HD 1.5 Remix	Nintendo Switch 2	October 2, 2026	Square Enix	Yes	Yes	Yes	
Kingdom Hearts HD 1.5 Remix	Xbox Series X/S	October 2, 2026	Square Enix	Yes	Yes	Yes	
Diffusion Million Arthur	PlayStation Vita	April 25, 2013	Square Enix	Yes			
Gyrozetter: Wings of the Albatross	Nintendo 3DS	June 13, 2013	Rocket Studio	Yes			
Skylanders: Spyro's Adventure	Wii U	July 13, 2013	Toys for Bob (Note: Ported to PlayStation 3 by XPEC Entertainment, ported to Nintendo 3DS by Vicarious Visions.)	Yes			
Skylanders: Spyro's Adventure	Wii	July 13, 2013	Toys for Bob	Yes			
Skylanders: Spyro's Adventure	PlayStation 3	July 13, 2013	Toys for Bob	Yes			
Skylanders: Spyro's Adventure	Nintendo 3DS	July 13, 2013	Toys for Bob	Yes			
Kingdom Hearts χ	Web browser	July 18, 2013	Square Enix / Success	Yes			
Chaos Rings	PlayStation Mobile	July 24, 2013	Media.Vision	Yes	Yes		
Lord of Vermilion III	Arcade	August 22, 2013	Think Garage	Yes			
Final Fantasy XIV: A Realm Reborn	PlayStation 3	August 27, 2013	Square Enix	Yes	Yes	Yes	
Final Fantasy XIV: A Realm Reborn	Windows	August 27, 2013	Square Enix	Yes	Yes	Yes	
Final Fantasy XIV: A Realm Reborn	PlayStation 4	April 14, 2014	Square Enix	Yes	Yes	Yes	
Final Fantasy XIV: A Realm Reborn	macOS	June 23, 2015	Square Enix	Yes	Yes	Yes	
Final Fantasy XIV: A Realm Reborn	PlayStation 5	May 25, 2021	Square Enix	Yes	Yes	Yes	
Final Fantasy XIV: A Realm Reborn	Xbox Series X/S	March 21, 2024	Square Enix	Yes	Yes	Yes	
Final Fantasy XIV: A Realm Reborn	Nintendo Switch 2	August 4, 2026	Square Enix	Yes	Yes	Yes	
Lightning Returns: Final Fantasy XIII	PlayStation 3	November 21, 2013	Square Enix	Yes	Yes	Yes	
Lightning Returns: Final Fantasy XIII	Xbox 360	November 21, 2013	Square Enix	Yes	Yes	Yes	
Lightning Returns: Final Fantasy XIII	Windows	December 10, 2015	Square Enix	Yes	Yes	Yes	
Lightning Returns: Final Fantasy XIII	Xbox One	November 13, 2018	Square Enix	Yes	Yes	Yes	
Drakengard 3	PlayStation 3	December 19, 2013	Access Games	Yes	Yes	Yes	
Final Fantasy X/X-2 HD Remaster	PlayStation 3	December 26, 2013	Square Enix / Virtuos	Yes	Yes	Yes	
Final Fantasy X/X-2 HD Remaster	PlayStation Vita	December 26, 2013	Square Enix / Virtuos	Yes	Yes	Yes	
Final Fantasy X/X-2 HD Remaster	PlayStation 4	May 12, 2015	Square Enix / Virtuos	Yes	Yes	Yes	
Final Fantasy X/X-2 HD Remaster	Windows	May 12, 2015	Square Enix / Virtuos	Yes	Yes	Yes	
Final Fantasy X/X-2 HD Remaster	Nintendo Switch	April 16, 2019	Square Enix / Virtuos	Yes	Yes	Yes	
Final Fantasy X/X-2 HD Remaster	Xbox One	April 16, 2019	Square Enix / Virtuos	Yes	Yes	Yes	
Final Fantasy X/X-2 HD Remaster	Nintendo Switch 2	July 23, 2026	Square Enix / Virtuos	Yes	Yes	Yes	
Dragon Quest Monsters 2: Iru and Luca's Marvelous Mysterious Key	Nintendo 3DS	February 6, 2014	Tose	Yes			
Gunslinger Stratos 2	Arcade	February 20, 2014	Byking	Yes			
Puzzle & Dragons Battle Tournament	Arcade	April 24, 2014	Square Enix / GungHo Online Entertainment	Yes			
Theatrhythm Final Fantasy: Curtain Call	Nintendo 3DS	April 24, 2014	indieszero	Yes	Yes	Yes	
Left 4 Dead: Survivors	Arcade	May 26, 2014	Taito	Yes			
Murdered: Soul Suspect	Windows	June 3, 2014	Airtight Games	Yes	Yes	Yes	
Murdered: Soul Suspect	PlayStation 3	June 3, 2014	Airtight Games	Yes	Yes	Yes	
Murdered: Soul Suspect	PlayStation 4	June 3, 2014	Airtight Games	Yes	Yes	Yes	
Murdered: Soul Suspect	Xbox 360	June 3, 2014	Airtight Games	Yes	Yes	Yes	
Murdered: Soul Suspect	Xbox One	June 3, 2014	Airtight Games	Yes	Yes	Yes	
WRC 4: FIA World Rally Championship	PlayStation 3	July 24, 2014	Milestone	Yes			
WRC 4: FIA World Rally Championship	PlayStation Vita	July 24, 2014	Milestone	Yes			
Kingdom Hearts HD 2.5 Remix	PlayStation 3	October 2, 2014	Square Enix	Yes	Yes	Yes	
Kingdom Hearts HD 2.5 Remix	PlayStation 4	March 9, 2017	Square Enix	Yes	Yes	Yes	
Kingdom Hearts HD 2.5 Remix	Xbox One	February 18, 2020	Square Enix	Yes	Yes	Yes	
Kingdom Hearts HD 2.5 Remix	Windows	March 30, 2021	Square Enix	Yes	Yes	Yes	
Kingdom Hearts HD 2.5 Remix	PlayStation 5	October 2, 2026	Square Enix	Yes	Yes	Yes	
Kingdom Hearts HD 2.5 Remix	Nintendo Switch 2	October 2, 2026	Square Enix	Yes	Yes	Yes	
Kingdom Hearts HD 2.5 Remix	Xbox Series X/S	October 2, 2026	Square Enix	Yes	Yes	Yes	
Chaos Rings III	PlayStation Vita	October 16, 2014	Media.Vision	Yes	Yes		
Deadman's Cross	PlayStation Vita	November 28, 2014	Square Enix	Yes			
Final Fantasy Explorers	Nintendo 3DS	December 18, 2014	Racjin	Yes	Yes	Yes	
Dragon Quest Heroes: The World Tree's Woe and the Blight Below	PlayStation 3	February 26, 2015	Omega Force	Yes	Yes	Yes	
Dragon Quest Heroes: The World Tree's Woe and the Blight Below	PlayStation 4	February 26, 2015	Omega Force	Yes	Yes	Yes	
Dragon Quest Heroes: The World Tree's Woe and the Blight Below	Windows	February 26, 2015	Omega Force	Yes	Yes	Yes	
Dragon Quest Heroes: The World Tree's Woe and the Blight Below	Nintendo Switch	March 3, 2017	Omega Force	Yes			
Final Fantasy Type-0 HD	PlayStation 4	March 19, 2015	Square Enix / HexaDrive	Yes	Yes	Yes	
Final Fantasy Type-0 HD	Xbox One	March 19, 2015	Square Enix / HexaDrive	Yes	Yes	Yes	
Final Fantasy Type-0 HD	Windows	August 18, 2015	Square Enix / HexaDrive	Yes	Yes	Yes	
Theatrhythm Dragon Quest	Nintendo 3DS	March 26, 2015	indieszero	Yes			
Bravely Second: End Layer	Nintendo 3DS	April 23, 2015	Silicon Studio	Yes	Yes	Yes	
Rise of Mana	PlayStation Vita	May 14, 2015	Goshow	Yes			
Imperial SaGa	Web browser	June 18, 2015	Square Enix	Yes			
Figureheads	Windows	July 8, 2015	Square Enix	Yes			
Figureheads	PlayStation 4	March 9, 2017	Square Enix	Yes	Yes		
School of Ragnarok	Arcade	August 27, 2015	Square Enix	Yes			
Dissidia Final Fantasy	Arcade	November 26, 2015	Team Ninja	Yes			
Dragon Quest Builders	PlayStation 3	January 28, 2016	Square Enix	Yes	Yes	Yes	
Dragon Quest Builders	PlayStation 4	January 28, 2016	Square Enix	Yes	Yes	Yes	
Dragon Quest Builders	PlayStation Vita	January 28, 2016	Square Enix	Yes	Yes	Yes	
Dragon Quest Builders	Nintendo Switch	February 9, 2018	Square Enix	Yes	Yes	Yes	
Dragon Quest Builders	Windows	February 13, 2024	Square Enix	Yes	Yes	Yes	
Adventures of Mana	PlayStation Vita	February 4, 2016	MCF	Yes	Yes	Yes	
I Am Setsuna	PlayStation 4	February 18, 2016	Tokyo RPG Factory	Yes	Yes	Yes	
I Am Setsuna	PlayStation Vita	February 18, 2016	Tokyo RPG Factory	Yes	Yes	Yes	
I Am Setsuna	Windows	July 19, 2016	Tokyo RPG Factory	Yes	Yes	Yes	
I Am Setsuna	Nintendo Switch	March 3, 2017	Tokyo RPG Factory	Yes	Yes	Yes	
Dragon Quest Monsters: Joker 3	Nintendo 3DS	March 23, 2016	Tose	Yes			
Romancing SaGa 2	PlayStation Vita	March 24, 2016	Square Enix	Yes	Yes	Yes	
Romancing SaGa 2	PlayStation 4	December 15, 2017	Square Enix	Yes	Yes	Yes	
Romancing SaGa 2	Xbox One	December 15, 2017	Square Enix	Yes	Yes	Yes	
Romancing SaGa 2	Windows	December 15, 2017	Square Enix	Yes	Yes	Yes	
Romancing SaGa 2	Nintendo Switch	December 15, 2017	Square Enix	Yes	Yes	Yes	
Star Ocean: Integrity and Faithlessness	PlayStation 4	March 31, 2016	tri-Ace	Yes	Yes	Yes	
Star Ocean: Integrity and Faithlessness	PlayStation 3	April 28, 2016	tri-Ace	Yes			
Gunslinger Stratos 3	Arcade	May 12, 2016	Byking	Yes			
Dragon Quest Heroes II	PlayStation 3	May 27, 2016	Omega Force	Yes	Yes	Yes	
Dragon Quest Heroes II	PlayStation 4	May 27, 2016	Omega Force	Yes	Yes	Yes	
Dragon Quest Heroes II	PlayStation Vita	May 27, 2016	Omega Force	Yes	Yes	Yes	
Dragon Quest Heroes II	Nintendo Switch	March 3, 2017	Omega Force	Yes			
Dragon Quest Heroes II	Windows	April 25, 2017	Omega Force	Yes	Yes	Yes	
Theatrhythm Final Fantasy All-Star Carnival	Arcade	September 27, 2016	indieszero	Yes			
A King's Tale: Final Fantasy XV	PlayStation 4	September 30, 2016	Empty Clip Studios	Yes	Yes	Yes	
A King's Tale: Final Fantasy XV	Xbox One	September 30, 2016	Empty Clip Studios	Yes	Yes	Yes	
World of Final Fantasy	PlayStation 4	October 25, 2016	Tose	Yes	Yes	Yes	
World of Final Fantasy	PlayStation Vita	October 25, 2016	Tose	Yes	Yes	Yes	
World of Final Fantasy	Windows	November 21, 2017	Tose	Yes	Yes	Yes	
World of Final Fantasy	Nintendo Switch	November 6, 2018	Tose	Yes	Yes	Yes	
World of Final Fantasy	Xbox One	November 6, 2018	Tose	Yes	Yes	Yes	
Mobius Final Fantasy	Windows	November 1, 2016	Square Enix	Yes	Yes	Yes	
Final Fantasy XV	PlayStation 4	November 29, 2016	Square Enix / HexaDrive / XPEC Entertainment / Luminous Productions	Yes	Yes	Yes	
Final Fantasy XV	Xbox One	November 29, 2016	Square Enix / HexaDrive / XPEC Entertainment / Luminous Productions	Yes	Yes	Yes	
Final Fantasy XV	Windows	March 6, 2018	Square Enix / HexaDrive / XPEC Entertainment / Luminous Productions	Yes	Yes	Yes	
Final Fantasy XV	Stadia	November 19, 2019	Square Enix / HexaDrive / XPEC Entertainment / Luminous Productions	Yes	Yes	Yes	
SaGa: Scarlet Grace	PlayStation Vita	December 15, 2016	Square Enix	Yes	Yes	Yes	
SaGa: Scarlet Grace	Windows	August 2, 2018	Square Enix	Yes	Yes	Yes	
SaGa: Scarlet Grace	Nintendo Switch	August 2, 2018	Square Enix	Yes	Yes	Yes	
SaGa: Scarlet Grace	PlayStation 4	August 2, 2018	Square Enix	Yes	Yes	Yes	
Kingdom Hearts HD 2.8 Final Chapter Prologue	PlayStation 4	January 12, 2017	Square Enix	Yes	Yes	Yes	
Kingdom Hearts HD 2.8 Final Chapter Prologue	Xbox One	February 18, 2020	Square Enix	Yes	Yes	Yes	
Kingdom Hearts HD 2.8 Final Chapter Prologue	Windows	March 30, 2021	Square Enix	Yes	Yes	Yes	
Kingdom Hearts HD 2.8 Final Chapter Prologue	PlayStation 5	October 2, 2026	Square Enix	Yes	Yes	Yes	
Kingdom Hearts HD 2.8 Final Chapter Prologue	Nintendo Switch 2	October 2, 2026	Square Enix	Yes	Yes	Yes	
Kingdom Hearts HD 2.8 Final Chapter Prologue	Xbox Series X/S	October 2, 2026	Square Enix	Yes	Yes	Yes	
Nier: Automata	PlayStation 4	February 23, 2017	PlatinumGames	Yes	Yes	Yes	
Nier: Automata	Windows	March 17, 2017	PlatinumGames	Yes	Yes	Yes	
Nier: Automata	Xbox One	June 26, 2018	PlatinumGames	Yes	Yes	Yes	
Nier: Automata	Nintendo Switch	October 6, 2022	PlatinumGames	Yes	Yes	Yes	
Spelunker Party!	Nintendo Switch	April 20, 2017	Tozai Games	Yes	Yes	Yes	
Spelunker Party!	Windows	April 20, 2017	Tozai Games	Yes	Yes	Yes	
Collection of Mana	Nintendo Switch	June 1, 2017	M2	Yes	Yes	Yes	
Final Fantasy XII: The Zodiac Age	PlayStation 4	July 11, 2017	Square Enix / Virtuos	Yes	Yes	Yes	
Final Fantasy XII: The Zodiac Age	Windows	February 1, 2018	Square Enix / Virtuos	Yes	Yes	Yes	
Final Fantasy XII: The Zodiac Age	Nintendo Switch	April 30, 2019	Square Enix / Virtuos	Yes	Yes	Yes	
Final Fantasy XII: The Zodiac Age	Xbox One	April 30, 2019	Square Enix / Virtuos	Yes	Yes	Yes	
Pictlogica Final Fantasy	Nintendo 3DS	July 12, 2017	Jupiter	Yes			
Dragon Quest XI	Nintendo 3DS	July 29, 2017	Square Enix	Yes			
Dragon Quest XI	PlayStation 4	July 29, 2017	Square Enix	Yes	Yes	Yes	
Dragon Quest XI	Windows	September 4, 2018	Square Enix	Yes	Yes	Yes	
Dragon Quest	PlayStation 4	August 10, 2017	Spike Chunsoft	Yes			
Dragon Quest	Nintendo 3DS	August 10, 2017	Spike Chunsoft	Yes			
Dragon Quest II	PlayStation 4	August 10, 2017	Spike Chunsoft	Yes			
Dragon Quest II	Nintendo 3DS	August 10, 2017	Spike Chunsoft	Yes			
Dragon Quest III	PlayStation 4	August 24, 2017	Spike Chunsoft	Yes			
Dragon Quest III	Nintendo 3DS	August 24, 2017	Spike Chunsoft	Yes			
Final Fantasy IX	PlayStation 4	September 19, 2017	Square Enix	Yes	Yes	Yes	
Final Fantasy IX	Nintendo Switch	February 13, 2019	Square Enix	Yes	Yes	Yes	
Final Fantasy IX	Xbox One	February 13, 2019	Square Enix	Yes	Yes	Yes	
Lost Sphear	Nintendo Switch	October 12, 2017	Tokyo RPG Factory	Yes	Yes	Yes	
Lost Sphear	PlayStation 4	October 12, 2017	Tokyo RPG Factory	Yes	Yes	Yes	
Lost Sphear	Windows	January 23, 2018	Tokyo RPG Factory	Yes	Yes	Yes	
Itadaki Street: Dragon Quest & Final Fantasy 30th Anniversary	PlayStation 4	October 19, 2017	Tose	Yes			
Itadaki Street: Dragon Quest & Final Fantasy 30th Anniversary	PlayStation Vita	October 19, 2017	Tose	Yes			
Million Arthur Arcana Blood	Arcade	November 21, 2017	Square Enix	Yes			
Million Arthur Arcana Blood	PlayStation 4	November 29, 2018	Square Enix	Yes			
Monster of the Deep: Final Fantasy XV	PlayStation VR	November 21, 2017	Square Enix	Yes	Yes	Yes	
Star Ocean: The Last Hope 4K & Full HD Remaster	Windows	November 28, 2017	tri-Ace	Yes	Yes	Yes	
Star Ocean: The Last Hope 4K & Full HD Remaster	PlayStation 4	November 28, 2017	tri-Ace	Yes	Yes	Yes	
Dissidia Final Fantasy NT	PlayStation 4	January 11, 2018	Team Ninja	Yes	Yes	Yes	
Dissidia Final Fantasy NT	Windows	March 12, 2019	Team Ninja	Yes	Yes	Yes	
Monster Energy Supercross	Microsoft Windows	February 13, 2018	Milestone srl		Yes	Yes	
Monster Energy Supercross	PlayStation 4	February 13, 2018	Milestone srl		Yes	Yes	
Monster Energy Supercross	Xbox One	February 13, 2018	Milestone srl		Yes	Yes	
Monster Energy Supercross	Nintendo Switch	February 13, 2018	Milestone srl		Yes	Yes	
Secret of Mana	Windows	February 15, 2018	Q Studios	Yes	Yes	Yes	
Secret of Mana	PlayStation 4	February 15, 2018	Q Studios	Yes	Yes	Yes	
Secret of Mana	PlayStation Vita	February 15, 2018	Q Studios	Yes	Yes	Yes	
Dragon Quest Rivals	Web browser	February 18, 2018	Tose	Yes			
Dragon Quest Rivals	Nintendo Switch	February 14, 2019	Tose	Yes			
Gravel	Microsoft Windows	February 27, 2018	Milestone srl		Yes	Yes	
Gravel	PlayStation 4	February 27, 2018	Milestone srl		Yes	Yes	
Gravel	Xbox One	February 27, 2018	Milestone srl		Yes	Yes	
Final Fantasy XV: Pocket Edition	Windows	June 6, 2018	Square Enix / XPEC Entertainment / SummerTimeStudio	Yes	Yes	Yes	
Final Fantasy XV: Pocket Edition	PlayStation 4	September 10, 2018	Square Enix / XPEC Entertainment / SummerTimeStudio	Yes	Yes	Yes	
Final Fantasy XV: Pocket Edition	Xbox One	September 10, 2018	Square Enix / XPEC Entertainment / SummerTimeStudio	Yes	Yes	Yes	
Final Fantasy XV: Pocket Edition	Nintendo Switch	September 13, 2018	Square Enix / XPEC Entertainment / SummerTimeStudio	Yes	Yes	Yes	
Octopath Traveler	Nintendo Switch	July 13, 2018	Acquire	Yes	Yes	Yes	
Octopath Traveler	Windows	June 7, 2019	Acquire	Yes	Yes	Yes	
Octopath Traveler	Stadia	April 28, 2020	Acquire	Yes	Yes	Yes	
Octopath Traveler	Xbox One	March 25, 2021	Acquire	Yes	Yes	Yes	
Octopath Traveler	PlayStation 4	June 5, 2024	Acquire	Yes	Yes	Yes	
Octopath Traveler	PlayStation 5	June 5, 2024	Acquire	Yes	Yes	Yes	
The World Ends with You: Final Remix	Nintendo Switch	September 27, 2018	Square Enix	Yes	Yes	Yes	
The Quiet Man	Windows	November 1, 2018	Human Head Studios	Yes	Yes	Yes	
The Quiet Man	PlayStation 4	November 1, 2018	Human Head Studios	Yes	Yes	Yes	
Starwing Paradox	Arcade	November 21, 2018	Square Enix	Yes			
Dragon Quest Builders 2	Nintendo Switch	December 20, 2018	Square Enix / Omega Force	Yes	Yes	Yes	
Dragon Quest Builders 2	PlayStation 4	December 20, 2018	Square Enix / Omega Force	Yes	Yes	Yes	
Dragon Quest Builders 2	Windows	December 10, 2019	Square Enix / Omega Force	Yes	Yes	Yes	
Kingdom Hearts III	PlayStation 4	January 25, 2019	Square Enix	Yes	Yes	Yes	
Kingdom Hearts III	Xbox One	January 25, 2019	Square Enix	Yes	Yes	Yes	
Kingdom Hearts III	Windows	March 30, 2021	Square Enix	Yes	Yes	Yes	
Kingdom Hearts III	PlayStation 5	October 2, 2026	Square Enix	Yes	Yes	Yes	
Kingdom Hearts III	Nintendo Switch 2	October 2, 2026	Square Enix	Yes	Yes	Yes	
Kingdom Hearts III	Xbox Series X/S	October 2, 2026	Square Enix	Yes	Yes	Yes	
Left Alive	Windows	February 28, 2019	Ilinx	Yes	Yes	Yes	
Left Alive	PlayStation 4	February 28, 2019	Ilinx	Yes	Yes	Yes	
Chocobo’s Mystery Dungeon Every Buddy!	PlayStation 4	March 20, 2019	Square Enix	Yes	Yes	Yes	
Chocobo’s Mystery Dungeon Every Buddy!	Nintendo Switch	March 20, 2019	Square Enix	Yes	Yes	Yes	
Oninaki	Windows	August 22, 2019	Tokyo RPG Factory	Yes	Yes	Yes	
Oninaki	Nintendo Switch	August 22, 2019	Tokyo RPG Factory	Yes	Yes	Yes	
Oninaki	PlayStation 4	August 22, 2019	Tokyo RPG Factory	Yes	Yes	Yes	
Final Fantasy VIII Remastered	Windows	September 3, 2019	Dotemu / Access Games	Yes	Yes	Yes	
Final Fantasy VIII Remastered	Nintendo Switch	September 3, 2019	Dotemu / Access Games	Yes	Yes	Yes	
Final Fantasy VIII Remastered	PlayStation 4	September 3, 2019	Dotemu / Access Games	Yes	Yes	Yes	
Final Fantasy VIII Remastered	Xbox One	September 3, 2019	Dotemu / Access Games	Yes	Yes	Yes	
Dragon Quest XI S	Nintendo Switch	September 27, 2019	Square Enix	Yes	Yes	Yes	
Dragon Quest XI S	Windows	December 4, 2020	Square Enix	Yes	Yes	Yes	
Dragon Quest XI S	PlayStation 4	December 4, 2020	Square Enix	Yes	Yes	Yes	
Dragon Quest XI S	Xbox One	December 4, 2020	Square Enix	Yes	Yes	Yes	
Dragon Quest XI S	Stadia	March 16, 2021	Square Enix	Yes	Yes	Yes	
Dragon Quest XI S	Nintendo Switch 2	September 24, 2026	Square Enix	Yes	Yes	Yes	
Imperial SaGa: Eclipse	Web browser	October 31, 2019	Square Enix	Yes			
Romancing SaGa 3	Windows	November 11, 2019	Square Enix	Yes	Yes	Yes	
Romancing SaGa 3	Nintendo Switch	November 11, 2019	Square Enix	Yes	Yes	Yes	
Romancing SaGa 3	PlayStation 4	November 11, 2019	Square Enix	Yes	Yes	Yes	
Romancing SaGa 3	PlayStation Vita	November 11, 2019	Square Enix	Yes	Yes	Yes	
Romancing SaGa 3	Xbox One	November 11, 2019	Square Enix	Yes	Yes	Yes	
Final Fantasy VII Remake	PlayStation 4	April 10, 2020	Square Enix	Yes	Yes	Yes	
Final Fantasy VII Remake	PlayStation 5	June 10, 2021	Square Enix	Yes	Yes	Yes	
Final Fantasy VII Remake	Windows	December 16, 2021	Square Enix	Yes	Yes	Yes	
Final Fantasy VII Remake	Nintendo Switch 2	January 22, 2026	Square Enix	Yes	Yes	Yes	
Final Fantasy VII Remake	Xbox Series X/S	January 22, 2026	Square Enix	Yes	Yes	Yes	
Trials of Mana	Windows	April 24, 2020	Xeen	Yes	Yes	Yes	
Trials of Mana	Nintendo Switch	April 24, 2020	Xeen	Yes	Yes	Yes	
Trials of Mana	PlayStation 4	April 24, 2020	Xeen	Yes	Yes	Yes	
Trials of Mana	Xbox Series X/S	September 26, 2024	Xeen	Yes	Yes	Yes	
Kingdom Hearts: Melody of Memory	Nintendo Switch	November 13, 2020	Square Enix / indieszero	Yes	Yes	Yes	
Kingdom Hearts: Melody of Memory	PlayStation 4	November 13, 2020	Square Enix / indieszero	Yes	Yes	Yes	
Kingdom Hearts: Melody of Memory	Xbox One	November 13, 2020	Square Enix / indieszero	Yes	Yes	Yes	
Kingdom Hearts: Melody of Memory	Windows	March 30, 2021	Square Enix / indieszero	Yes	Yes	Yes	
Collection of SaGa: Final Fantasy Legend	Nintendo Switch	December 15, 2020	Square Enix	Yes	Yes	Yes	
Collection of SaGa: Final Fantasy Legend	Windows	October 21, 2021	Square Enix	Yes	Yes	Yes	
Bravely Default II	Nintendo Switch	February 26, 2021	Claytechworks	Yes	Yes	Yes	
Bravely Default II	Windows	September 2, 2021	Claytechworks	Yes	Yes	Yes	
Balan Wonderworld	Windows	March 26, 2021	Balan Company / Arzest	Yes	Yes	Yes	
Balan Wonderworld	Nintendo Switch	March 26, 2021	Balan Company / Arzest	Yes	Yes	Yes	
Balan Wonderworld	PlayStation 4	March 26, 2021	Balan Company / Arzest	Yes	Yes	Yes	
Balan Wonderworld	PlayStation 5	March 26, 2021	Balan Company / Arzest	Yes	Yes	Yes	
Balan Wonderworld	Xbox One	March 26, 2021	Balan Company / Arzest	Yes	Yes	Yes	
Balan Wonderworld	Xbox Series X/S	March 26, 2021	Balan Company / Arzest	Yes	Yes	Yes	
SaGa Frontier Remastered	Windows	April 15, 2021	Bullets	Yes	Yes	Yes	
SaGa Frontier Remastered	Nintendo Switch	April 15, 2021	Bullets	Yes	Yes	Yes	
SaGa Frontier Remastered	PlayStation 4	April 15, 2021	Bullets	Yes	Yes	Yes	
Legend of Mana	Windows	June 24, 2021	M2 / Digital Works Entertainment	Yes	Yes	Yes	
Legend of Mana	Nintendo Switch	June 24, 2021	M2 / Digital Works Entertainment	Yes	Yes	Yes	
Legend of Mana	PlayStation 4	June 24, 2021	M2 / Digital Works Entertainment	Yes	Yes	Yes	
Legend of Mana	Xbox Series X/S	September 26, 2024	M2 / Digital Works Entertainment	Yes	Yes	Yes	
Neo: The World Ends with You	Nintendo Switch	July 27, 2021	Square Enix / h.a.n.d.	Yes	Yes	Yes	
Neo: The World Ends with You	PlayStation 4	July 27, 2021	Square Enix / h.a.n.d.	Yes	Yes	Yes	
Neo: The World Ends with You	Windows	September 28, 2021	Square Enix / h.a.n.d.	Yes	Yes	Yes	
Final Fantasy Pixel Remaster	Windows	July 28, 2021	Tose	Yes	Yes	Yes	
Final Fantasy Pixel Remaster	PlayStation 4	April 19, 2023	Tose	Yes	Yes	Yes	
Final Fantasy Pixel Remaster	Nintendo Switch	April 19, 2023	Tose	Yes	Yes	Yes	
Final Fantasy Pixel Remaster	Xbox Series X/S	September 26, 2024	Tose	Yes	Yes	Yes	
Final Fantasy II Pixel Remaster	Windows	July 28, 2021	Tose	Yes	Yes	Yes	
Final Fantasy II Pixel Remaster	PlayStation 4	April 19, 2023	Tose	Yes	Yes	Yes	
Final Fantasy II Pixel Remaster	Nintendo Switch	April 19, 2023	Tose	Yes	Yes	Yes	
Final Fantasy II Pixel Remaster	Xbox Series X/S	September 26, 2024	Tose	Yes	Yes	Yes	
Final Fantasy III Pixel Remaster	Windows	July 28, 2021	Tose	Yes	Yes	Yes	
Final Fantasy III Pixel Remaster	PlayStation 4	April 19, 2023	Tose	Yes	Yes	Yes	
Final Fantasy III Pixel Remaster	Nintendo Switch	April 19, 2023	Tose	Yes	Yes	Yes	
Final Fantasy III Pixel Remaster	Xbox Series X/S	September 26, 2024	Tose	Yes	Yes	Yes	
Final Fantasy IV Pixel Remaster	Windows	September 8, 2021	Tose	Yes	Yes	Yes	
Final Fantasy IV Pixel Remaster	PlayStation 4	April 19, 2023	Tose	Yes	Yes	Yes	
Final Fantasy IV Pixel Remaster	Nintendo Switch	April 19, 2023	Tose	Yes	Yes	Yes	
Final Fantasy IV Pixel Remaster	Xbox Series X/S	September 26, 2024	Tose	Yes	Yes	Yes	
Actraiser Renaissance	Windows	September 23, 2021	Square Enix / Sonic Powered	Yes	Yes	Yes	
Actraiser Renaissance	Nintendo Switch	September 23, 2021	Square Enix / Sonic Powered	Yes	Yes	Yes	
Actraiser Renaissance	PlayStation 4	September 23, 2021	Square Enix / Sonic Powered	Yes	Yes	Yes	
Dungeon Encounters	Windows	October 14, 2021	Cattle Call	Yes	Yes	Yes	
Dungeon Encounters	Nintendo Switch	October 14, 2021	Cattle Call	Yes	Yes	Yes	
Dungeon Encounters	PlayStation 4	October 14, 2021	Cattle Call	Yes	Yes	Yes	
Voice of Cards: The Isle Dragon Roars	Windows	October 28, 2021	Alim	Yes	Yes	Yes	
Voice of Cards: The Isle Dragon Roars	Nintendo Switch	October 28, 2021	Alim	Yes	Yes	Yes	
Voice of Cards: The Isle Dragon Roars	PlayStation 4	October 28, 2021	Alim	Yes	Yes	Yes	
Final Fantasy V Pixel Remaster	Windows	November 10, 2021	Tose	Yes	Yes	Yes	
Final Fantasy V Pixel Remaster	PlayStation 4	April 19, 2023	Tose	Yes	Yes	Yes	
Final Fantasy V Pixel Remaster	Nintendo Switch	April 19, 2023	Tose	Yes	Yes	Yes	
Final Fantasy V Pixel Remaster	Xbox Series X/S	September 26, 2024	Tose	Yes	Yes	Yes	
Voice of Cards: The Forsaken Maiden	Windows	February 17, 2022	Alim	Yes	Yes	Yes	
Voice of Cards: The Forsaken Maiden	Nintendo Switch	February 17, 2022	Alim	Yes	Yes	Yes	
Voice of Cards: The Forsaken Maiden	PlayStation 4	February 17, 2022	Alim	Yes	Yes	Yes	
Final Fantasy VI Pixel Remaster	Windows	February 23, 2022	Tose	Yes	Yes	Yes	
Final Fantasy VI Pixel Remaster	PlayStation 4	April 19, 2023	Tose	Yes	Yes	Yes	
Final Fantasy VI Pixel Remaster	Nintendo Switch	April 19, 2023	Tose	Yes	Yes	Yes	
Final Fantasy VI Pixel Remaster	Xbox Series X/S	September 26, 2024	Tose	Yes	Yes	Yes	
Babylon's Fall	Windows	March 3, 2022	PlatinumGames	Yes	Yes	Yes	
Babylon's Fall	PlayStation 4	March 3, 2022	PlatinumGames	Yes	Yes	Yes	
Babylon's Fall	PlayStation 5	March 3, 2022	PlatinumGames	Yes	Yes	Yes	
Triangle Strategy	Nintendo Switch	March 4, 2022	Artdink / Netchubiyori	Yes	Yes	Yes	
Triangle Strategy	Windows	October 13, 2022	Artdink / Netchubiyori	Yes	Yes	Yes	
Triangle Strategy	PlayStation 5	August 20, 2025	Artdink / Netchubiyori	Yes	Yes	Yes	
Triangle Strategy	Xbox Series X/S	August 20, 2025	Artdink / Netchubiyori	Yes	Yes	Yes	
Chocobo GP	Nintendo Switch	March 10, 2022	Arika	Yes	Yes	Yes	
Stranger of Paradise: Final Fantasy Origin	Windows	March 18, 2022	Team Ninja	Yes	Yes	Yes	
Stranger of Paradise: Final Fantasy Origin	PlayStation 4	March 18, 2022	Team Ninja	Yes	Yes	Yes	
Stranger of Paradise: Final Fantasy Origin	PlayStation 5	March 18, 2022	Team Ninja	Yes	Yes	Yes	
Stranger of Paradise: Final Fantasy Origin	Xbox One	March 18, 2022	Team Ninja	Yes	Yes	Yes	
Stranger of Paradise: Final Fantasy Origin	Xbox Series X/S	March 18, 2022	Team Ninja	Yes	Yes	Yes	
Chrono Cross: The Radical Dreamers Edition	Windows	April 7, 2022	D4 Enterprise	Yes	Yes	Yes	
Chrono Cross: The Radical Dreamers Edition	Nintendo Switch	April 7, 2022	D4 Enterprise	Yes	Yes	Yes	
Chrono Cross: The Radical Dreamers Edition	PlayStation 4	April 7, 2022	D4 Enterprise	Yes	Yes	Yes	
Chrono Cross: The Radical Dreamers Edition	Xbox One	April 7, 2022	D4 Enterprise	Yes	Yes	Yes	
The Centennial Case: A Shijima Story	Windows	May 12, 2022	h.a.n.d.	Yes	Yes	Yes	
The Centennial Case: A Shijima Story	Nintendo Switch	May 12, 2022	h.a.n.d.	Yes	Yes	Yes	
The Centennial Case: A Shijima Story	PlayStation 4	May 12, 2022	h.a.n.d.	Yes	Yes	Yes	
The Centennial Case: A Shijima Story	PlayStation 5	May 12, 2022	h.a.n.d.	Yes	Yes	Yes	
Live A Live	Nintendo Switch	July 22, 2022	Historia	Yes	Yes	Yes	
Live A Live	Windows	April 27, 2023	Historia	Yes	Yes	Yes	
Live A Live	PlayStation 4	April 27, 2023	Historia	Yes	Yes	Yes	
Live A Live	PlayStation 5	April 27, 2023	Historia	Yes	Yes	Yes	
Voice of Cards: The Beasts of Burden	Windows	September 13, 2022	Alim	Yes	Yes	Yes	
Voice of Cards: The Beasts of Burden	Nintendo Switch	September 13, 2022	Alim	Yes	Yes	Yes	
Voice of Cards: The Beasts of Burden	PlayStation 4	September 13, 2022	Alim	Yes	Yes	Yes	
Various Daylife	Windows	September 13, 2022	DokiDoki Groove Works	Yes	Yes	Yes	
Various Daylife	Nintendo Switch	September 13, 2022	DokiDoki Groove Works	Yes	Yes	Yes	
Various Daylife	PlayStation 4	September 16, 2022	DokiDoki Groove Works	Yes	Yes	Yes	
The Diofield Chronicle	Windows	September 22, 2022	Lancarse	Yes	Yes	Yes	
The Diofield Chronicle	Nintendo Switch	September 22, 2022	Lancarse	Yes	Yes	Yes	
The Diofield Chronicle	PlayStation 4	September 22, 2022	Lancarse	Yes	Yes	Yes	
The Diofield Chronicle	PlayStation 5	September 22, 2022	Lancarse	Yes	Yes	Yes	
The Diofield Chronicle	Xbox One	September 22, 2022	Lancarse	Yes	Yes	Yes	
The Diofield Chronicle	Xbox Series X/S	September 22, 2022	Lancarse	Yes	Yes	Yes	
Valkyrie Elysium	PlayStation 4	September 29, 2022	Soleil	Yes	Yes	Yes	
Valkyrie Elysium	PlayStation 5	September 29, 2022	Soleil	Yes	Yes	Yes	
Valkyrie Elysium	Windows	November 11, 2022	Soleil	Yes	Yes	Yes	
Star Ocean: The Divine Force	Windows	October 27, 2022	tri-Ace	Yes	Yes	Yes	
Star Ocean: The Divine Force	PlayStation 4	October 27, 2022	tri-Ace	Yes	Yes	Yes	
Star Ocean: The Divine Force	PlayStation 5	October 27, 2022	tri-Ace	Yes	Yes	Yes	
Star Ocean: The Divine Force	Xbox One	October 27, 2022	tri-Ace	Yes	Yes	Yes	
Star Ocean: The Divine Force	Xbox Series X/S	October 27, 2022	tri-Ace	Yes	Yes	Yes	
Harvestella	Windows	November 4, 2022	Live Wire	Yes	Yes	Yes	
Harvestella	Nintendo Switch	November 4, 2022	Live Wire	Yes	Yes	Yes	
Tactics Ogre: Reborn	Windows	November 11, 2022	Algebra Factory, Zereo	Yes	Yes	Yes	
Tactics Ogre: Reborn	Nintendo Switch	November 11, 2022	Algebra Factory, Zereo	Yes	Yes	Yes	
Tactics Ogre: Reborn	PlayStation 4	November 11, 2022	Algebra Factory, Zereo	Yes	Yes	Yes	
Tactics Ogre: Reborn	PlayStation 5	November 11, 2022	Algebra Factory, Zereo	Yes	Yes	Yes	
Dragon Quest Treasures	Nintendo Switch	December 9, 2022	Tose	Yes	Yes	Yes	
Dragon Quest Treasures	Windows	July 14, 2023	Tose	Yes	Yes	Yes	
Crisis Core: Final Fantasy VII Reunion	Windows	December 13, 2022	Tose	Yes	Yes	Yes	
Crisis Core: Final Fantasy VII Reunion	Nintendo Switch	December 13, 2022	Tose	Yes	Yes	Yes	
Crisis Core: Final Fantasy VII Reunion	PlayStation 4	December 13, 2022	Tose	Yes	Yes	Yes	
Crisis Core: Final Fantasy VII Reunion	PlayStation 5	December 13, 2022	Tose	Yes	Yes	Yes	
Crisis Core: Final Fantasy VII Reunion	Xbox One	December 13, 2022	Tose	Yes	Yes	Yes	
Crisis Core: Final Fantasy VII Reunion	Xbox Series X/S	December 13, 2022	Tose	Yes	Yes	Yes	
Crisis Core: Final Fantasy VII Reunion	Nintendo Switch 2	September 9, 2026	Tose	Yes	Yes	Yes	
Forspoken	Windows	January 24, 2023	Luminous Productions	Yes	Yes	Yes	
Forspoken	PlayStation 5	January 24, 2023	Luminous Productions	Yes	Yes	Yes	
Theatrhythm Final Bar Line	Nintendo Switch	February 16, 2023	indieszero	Yes	Yes	Yes	
Theatrhythm Final Bar Line	PlayStation 4	February 16, 2023	indieszero	Yes	Yes	Yes	
Octopath Traveler II	Windows	February 24, 2023	Acquire	Yes	Yes	Yes	
Octopath Traveler II	Nintendo Switch	February 24, 2023	Acquire	Yes	Yes	Yes	
Octopath Traveler II	PlayStation 4	February 24, 2023	Acquire	Yes	Yes	Yes	
Octopath Traveler II	PlayStation 5	February 24, 2023	Acquire	Yes	Yes	Yes	
Octopath Traveler II	Xbox One	June 5, 2024	Acquire	Yes	Yes	Yes	
Octopath Traveler II	Xbox Series X/S	June 5, 2024	Acquire	Yes	Yes	Yes	
Paranormasight: The Seven Mysteries of Honjo	Windows	March 9, 2023	Xeen	Yes	Yes	Yes	
Paranormasight: The Seven Mysteries of Honjo	Nintendo Switch	March 9, 2023	Xeen	Yes	Yes	Yes	
Square Enix AI Tech Preview: The Portopia Serial Murder Case	Windows	April 24, 2023	Square Enix	Yes	Yes	Yes	
Final Fantasy XVI	PlayStation 5	June 22, 2023	Square Enix	Yes	Yes	Yes	
Final Fantasy XVI	Windows	September 17, 2024	Square Enix	Yes	Yes	Yes	
Final Fantasy XVI	Xbox Series X/S	June 8, 2025	Square Enix	Yes	Yes	Yes	
Ketsugou Danshi: Elements with Emotions	Nintendo Switch	June 29, 2023	Square Enix	Yes			
Dragon Quest: The Adventure of Dai – Infinity Strash	Windows	September 28, 2023	Game Studio / Kai Graphics	Yes	Yes	Yes	
Dragon Quest: The Adventure of Dai – Infinity Strash	Nintendo Switch	September 28, 2023	Game Studio / Kai Graphics	Yes	Yes	Yes	
Dragon Quest: The Adventure of Dai – Infinity Strash	PlayStation 4	September 28, 2023	Game Studio / Kai Graphics	Yes	Yes	Yes	
Dragon Quest: The Adventure of Dai – Infinity Strash	PlayStation 5	September 28, 2023	Game Studio / Kai Graphics	Yes	Yes	Yes	
Dragon Quest: The Adventure of Dai – Infinity Strash	Xbox Series X/S	September 28, 2023	Game Studio / Kai Graphics	Yes	Yes	Yes	
Star Ocean: The Second Story R	Windows	November 2, 2023	Gemdrops	Yes	Yes	Yes	
Star Ocean: The Second Story R	Nintendo Switch	November 2, 2023	Gemdrops	Yes	Yes	Yes	
Star Ocean: The Second Story R	PlayStation 4	November 2, 2023	Gemdrops	Yes	Yes	Yes	
Star Ocean: The Second Story R	PlayStation 5	November 2, 2023	Gemdrops	Yes	Yes	Yes	
Star Ocean: The Second Story R	Nintendo Switch 2	July 16, 2026	Gemdrops	Yes	Yes	Yes	
Dragon Quest Monsters: The Dark Prince	Nintendo Switch	December 1, 2023	Tose	Yes	Yes	Yes	
Dragon Quest Monsters: The Dark Prince	Windows	September 11, 2024	Tose	Yes	Yes	Yes	
Final Fantasy VII: Ever Crisis	Windows	December 7, 2023	Applibot	Yes	Yes	Yes	
Foamstars	PlayStation 4	February 6, 2024	Toylogic	Yes	Yes	Yes	
Foamstars	PlayStation 5	February 6, 2024	Toylogic	Yes	Yes	Yes	
Final Fantasy VII Rebirth	PlayStation 5	February 29, 2024	Square Enix	Yes	Yes	Yes	
Final Fantasy VII Rebirth	Windows	January 23, 2025	Square Enix	Yes	Yes	Yes	
Final Fantasy VII Rebirth	Nintendo Switch 2	June 3, 2026	Square Enix	Yes	Yes	Yes	
Final Fantasy VII Rebirth	Xbox Series X/S	June 3, 2026	Square Enix	Yes	Yes	Yes	
SaGa: Emerald Beyond	Windows	April 25, 2024	Square Enix	Yes	Yes	Yes	
SaGa: Emerald Beyond	Nintendo Switch	April 25, 2024	Square Enix	Yes	Yes	Yes	
SaGa: Emerald Beyond	PlayStation 4	April 25, 2024	Square Enix	Yes	Yes	Yes	
SaGa: Emerald Beyond	PlayStation 5	April 25, 2024	Square Enix	Yes	Yes	Yes	
Visions of Mana	Windows	August 29, 2024	Ouka Studios	Yes	Yes	Yes	
Visions of Mana	PlayStation 4	August 29, 2024	Ouka Studios	Yes	Yes	Yes	
Visions of Mana	PlayStation 5	August 29, 2024	Ouka Studios	Yes	Yes	Yes	
Visions of Mana	Xbox Series X/S	August 29, 2024	Ouka Studios	Yes	Yes	Yes	
Romancing SaGa 2: Revenge of the Seven	Windows	October 24, 2024	Xeen	Yes	Yes	Yes	
Romancing SaGa 2: Revenge of the Seven	Nintendo Switch	October 24, 2024	Xeen	Yes	Yes	Yes	
Romancing SaGa 2: Revenge of the Seven	PlayStation 4	October 24, 2024	Xeen	Yes	Yes	Yes	
Romancing SaGa 2: Revenge of the Seven	PlayStation 5	October 24, 2024	Xeen	Yes	Yes	Yes	
Romancing SaGa 2: Revenge of the Seven	Nintendo Switch 2	July 31, 2025	Xeen	Yes	Yes	Yes	
Dragon Quest III HD-2D Remake	Windows	November 14, 2024	Artdink	Yes	Yes	Yes	
Dragon Quest III HD-2D Remake	Nintendo Switch	November 14, 2024	Artdink	Yes	Yes	Yes	
Dragon Quest III HD-2D Remake	PlayStation 5	November 14, 2024	Artdink	Yes	Yes	Yes	
Dragon Quest III HD-2D Remake	Xbox Series X/S	November 14, 2024	Artdink	Yes	Yes	Yes	
Emberstoria	Windows	November 27, 2024	Square Enix / DMM Games	Yes			
Fantasian: Neo Dimension	Windows	December 5, 2024	Mistwalker	Yes	Yes	Yes	
Fantasian: Neo Dimension	Nintendo Switch	December 5, 2024	Mistwalker	Yes	Yes	Yes	
Fantasian: Neo Dimension	PlayStation 4	December 5, 2024	Mistwalker	Yes	Yes	Yes	
Fantasian: Neo Dimension	PlayStation 5	December 5, 2024	Mistwalker	Yes	Yes	Yes	
Fantasian: Neo Dimension	Xbox Series X/S	December 5, 2024	Mistwalker	Yes	Yes	Yes	
SaGa Frontier 2 Remastered	Windows	March 27, 2025	Bullets	Yes	Yes	Yes	
SaGa Frontier 2 Remastered	Nintendo Switch	March 27, 2025	Bullets	Yes	Yes	Yes	
SaGa Frontier 2 Remastered	PlayStation 4	March 27, 2025	Bullets	Yes	Yes	Yes	
SaGa Frontier 2 Remastered	PlayStation 5	March 27, 2025	Bullets	Yes	Yes	Yes	
Final Fantasy Tactics: The Ivalice Chronicles	Windows	September 30, 2025	Square Enix	Yes	Yes	Yes	
Final Fantasy Tactics: The Ivalice Chronicles	Nintendo Switch	September 30, 2025	Square Enix	Yes	Yes	Yes	
Final Fantasy Tactics: The Ivalice Chronicles	Nintendo Switch 2	September 30, 2025	Square Enix	Yes	Yes	Yes	
Final Fantasy Tactics: The Ivalice Chronicles	PlayStation 4	September 30, 2025	Square Enix	Yes	Yes	Yes	
Final Fantasy Tactics: The Ivalice Chronicles	PlayStation 5	September 30, 2025	Square Enix	Yes	Yes	Yes	
Final Fantasy Tactics: The Ivalice Chronicles	Xbox Series X/S	September 30, 2025	Square Enix	Yes	Yes	Yes	
Dragon Quest I & II HD-2D Remake	Windows	October 30, 2025	Artdink	Yes	Yes	Yes	
Dragon Quest I & II HD-2D Remake	Nintendo Switch	October 30, 2025	Artdink	Yes	Yes	Yes	
Dragon Quest I & II HD-2D Remake	Nintendo Switch 2	October 30, 2025	Artdink	Yes	Yes	Yes	
Dragon Quest I & II HD-2D Remake	PlayStation 5	October 30, 2025	Artdink	Yes	Yes	Yes	
Dragon Quest I & II HD-2D Remake	Xbox Series X/S	October 30, 2025	Artdink	Yes	Yes	Yes	
Octopath Traveler 0	Windows	December 4, 2025	DokiDoki Groove Works	Yes	Yes	Yes	
Octopath Traveler 0	Nintendo Switch	December 4, 2025	DokiDoki Groove Works	Yes	Yes	Yes	
Octopath Traveler 0	Nintendo Switch 2	December 4, 2025	DokiDoki Groove Works	Yes	Yes	Yes	
Octopath Traveler 0	PlayStation 4	December 4, 2025	DokiDoki Groove Works	Yes	Yes	Yes	
Octopath Traveler 0	PlayStation 5	December 4, 2025	DokiDoki Groove Works	Yes	Yes	Yes	
Octopath Traveler 0	Xbox Series X/S	December 4, 2025	DokiDoki Groove Works	Yes	Yes	Yes	
Dragon Quest VII Reimagined	Windows	February 5, 2026	HexaDrive	Yes	Yes	Yes	
Dragon Quest VII Reimagined	Nintendo Switch	February 5, 2026	HexaDrive	Yes	Yes	Yes	
Dragon Quest VII Reimagined	Nintendo Switch 2	February 5, 2026	HexaDrive	Yes	Yes	Yes	
Dragon Quest VII Reimagined	PlayStation 5	February 5, 2026	HexaDrive	Yes	Yes	Yes	
Dragon Quest VII Reimagined	Xbox Series X/S	February 5, 2026	HexaDrive	Yes	Yes	Yes	
Killer Inn	Windows	February 12, 2026	Tactics Studio	Yes	Yes	Yes	
Paranormasight: The Mermaid's Curse	Windows	February 19, 2026	Xeen	Yes	Yes	Yes	
Paranormasight: The Mermaid's Curse	Nintendo Switch	February 19, 2026	Xeen	Yes	Yes	Yes	
The Adventures of Elliot: The Millennium Tales	Windows	June 18, 2026	Claytechworks	Yes	Yes	Yes	
The Adventures of Elliot: The Millennium Tales	Nintendo Switch 2	June 18, 2026	Claytechworks	Yes	Yes	Yes	
The Adventures of Elliot: The Millennium Tales	PlayStation 5	June 18, 2026	Claytechworks	Yes	Yes	Yes	
The Adventures of Elliot: The Millennium Tales	Xbox Series X/S	June 18, 2026	Claytechworks	Yes	Yes	Yes	
Final Fantasy Resonance	Windows	October 22, 2026	Lancarse	Yes	Yes	Yes	
Final Fantasy Resonance	Nintendo Switch	October 22, 2026	Lancarse	Yes	Yes	Yes	
Final Fantasy Resonance	Nintendo Switch 2	October 22, 2026	Lancarse	Yes	Yes	Yes	
Final Fantasy Resonance	PlayStation 5	October 22, 2026	Lancarse	Yes	Yes	Yes	
Final Fantasy Resonance	Xbox Series X/S	October 22, 2026	Lancarse	Yes	Yes	Yes	
Dragon Quest Monsters: The Withered World	Windows	December 3, 2026	Tose / Square Enix	Coming	Coming	Coming	
Dragon Quest Monsters: The Withered World	Nintendo Switch	December 3, 2026	Tose / Square Enix	Coming	Coming	Coming	
Dragon Quest Monsters: The Withered World	Nintendo Switch 2	December 3, 2026	Tose / Square Enix	Coming	Coming	Coming	
Dragon Quest Monsters: The Withered World	PlayStation 5	December 3, 2026	Tose / Square Enix	Coming	Coming	Coming	
Dragon Quest Monsters: The Withered World	Xbox Series X/S	December 3, 2026	Tose / Square Enix	Coming	Coming	Coming	
Romancing SaGa 3: Destinies United	PlayStation 5	February 16, 2027	Square Enix	Coming	Coming	Coming	
Romancing SaGa 3: Destinies United	Windows	February 16, 2027	Square Enix	Coming	Coming	Coming	
Romancing SaGa 3: Destinies United	Nintendo Switch	February 16, 2027	Square Enix	Coming	Coming	Coming	
Romancing SaGa 3: Destinies United	Nintendo Switch 2	February 16, 2027	Square Enix	Coming	Coming	Coming	
Romancing SaGa 3: Destinies United	Xbox Series X/S	February 16, 2027	Square Enix	Coming	Coming	Coming	
Final Fantasy VII Revelation	PlayStation 5	April 8, 2027	Square Enix	Coming	Coming	Coming	
Final Fantasy VII Revelation	Windows	April 8, 2027	Square Enix	Coming	Coming	Coming	
Final Fantasy VII Revelation	Nintendo Switch 2	April 8, 2027	Square Enix	Coming	Coming	Coming	
Final Fantasy VII Revelation	Xbox Series X/S	April 8, 2027	Square Enix	Coming	Coming	Coming	
Kingdom Hearts IV	PlayStation 5	2027	Square Enix	Coming	Coming	Coming	
Kingdom Hearts IV	Windows	2027	Square Enix	Coming	Coming	Coming	
Kingdom Hearts IV	Nintendo Switch 2	2027	Square Enix	Coming	Coming	Coming	
Kingdom Hearts IV	Xbox Series X/S	2027	Square Enix	Coming	Coming	Coming	
Dragon Quest XII: Beyond Dreams	TBA	TBA	Square Enix	Coming	Coming	Coming	

== See also ==
- List of Eidos Interactive games
