= Kenshin =

Kenshin is a Japanese masculine given name. It may refer to:

== Fiction ==
- Rurouni Kenshin, a manga series
  - Rurouni Kenshin (1996 TV series), the first animated series adaptation of the manga
  - Rurouni Kenshin (2023 TV series), the second animated series adaptation of the manga
  - Rurouni Kenshin (film), the 2012 film adaptation of the manga
  - Himura Kenshin (緋村 剣心), the main character of Rurouni Kenshin
- Kenshin Dragon Quest: Yomigaerishi Densetsu no Ken, a Dragon Quest video-game

== People ==
- Uesugi Kenshin (上杉 謙信; 1530–1578), Japanese historical figure
- Kenshin Kawakami (川上 憲伸; born 1975), Japanese baseball pitcher
- Kenshin Sumitaku (1961–1987, a.k.a. Kenshin), Japanese haiku poet
- Masahiro Omori (大森 政弘; born 1978 a.k.a. Kenshin), Japanese professional wrestler
