= Sigma Harmonics =

2008 video game

- Developers: Square Enix; Think Garage
- Publisher: Square Enix
- Director: Hiroki Chiba
- Producer: Yoshinori Kitase
- Artist: Yusaku Nakaaki
- Writer: Hiroki Chiba
- Composer: Masashi Hamauzu
- Platforms: Nintendo DS; Mobile phone
- Release: DS: JP: 21 August 2008; Mobile: JP: January 28, 2010
- Genre: Role-playing
- Mode: Single-player

Sigma Harmonics (Note: Shiguma Hāmonikusu (Japanese: シグマ・ハーモニクス)) is a 2008 role-playing video game co-developed by Square Enix and Think Garage, and published by Square Enix for the Nintendo DS. An expanded port for mobile devices was released in 2010 under the title Sigma Harmonics Coda. (Note: Shiguma Hāmonikusu Kōda (シグマ ハーモニクス コーダ)) The storyline follows Sigma Kurogami, a member of a magical family based in Tokyo. He goes on a mission through time with childhood friend Neon Tsukiyumi after demons escape the family's imprisonment and rewrite history through a series of murders. The gameplay combines role-playing combat mechanics, and adventure-style investigation and storytelling.

Production began following the release of Dirge of Cerberus: Final Fantasy VII in 2006; that game's writer Hiroki Chiba acted as both director and writer for Sigma Harmonics. Other returning team members included producer Yoshinori Kitase, artist Yusaku Nakaaki, and composer Masashi Hamauzu. The premise was inspired by Chiba's liking for Shōwa period mystery writers. The team used tools supplied by CRI Middleware to both fit all their planned content on the DS cartridge and incorporate Hamauzu's music with minimal reduction in quality.

First announced in March 2008, it was promoted using an episodic radio drama released through the game's website, and a series of commercials blending gameplay footage with anime sequences created by Sanzigen. The mobile port included a section designed as a standalone demo for the original. No version of the game has left Japan, a fact attributed to its extensive incorporation of Japanese culture. At release, it was one of Square Enix's more successful original titles, selling 70,000 units within a month. Reception of the game in Japan and its limited Western reviews has been generally positive, with praise going to its battle system and investigation mechanics.

== Gameplay ==
A battle in Sigma Harmonics; protagonist Neon Tsukiyumi fights a monster using assigned cards.

Sigma Harmonics is a role-playing video game in which players take on the roles of Sigma Kurogami and Neon Tsukiyumi, who go on an adventure requiring them to travel through time using an artifact called the Great Clock. The entire game takes place within Kurogami Mansion, which is portrayed in-game with 2D pre-rendered backgrounds on which 3D models appear. The game, split into several chapters, is played using the Nintendo DS's book orientation; the top screen displays illustration-style cutscenes and battle sequences, while the touch screen is used for issuing commands and completing other gameplay segments. In the room of the Great Clock, Sigma can initiate his Time Spin power, going both between timelines and to different points within a timeline. These different times are represented with illustrated cards.

During exploration and its associated adventure segments, the player controls Sigma as he explores Kurogami Mansion. Using black monuments in the environment, Sigma can relive the events of the crime within that area, discovering events and unlocking clues. Sigma can also stand in environments and scan for additional information, which take the forms of medals representing a clue. When enough clues are assembled, Sigma can trigger the Superdeduction system, his mental image of the case represented with a grid containing black nodes symbolizing key aspects of the mystery. The clue medals must be arranged around the black nodes, unlocking a perceived sequence of events and allowing Sigma to reach a solution to the mystery using an inference to fill in blanks. Depending on the strength and logic of Sigma's solution, the final boss of a chapter can be weaker (sound reasoning) or stronger (poor reasoning).

Battles are triggered either through a random encounter or scripted boss battles, with the player characters being transported to a dedicated arena. There are also extra powerful enemies roaming some parts of the field which can be either engaged or avoided. In these battles, Neon takes the role of fighter directed by Sigma (the player), fighting surrounding groups of demon enemies with abilities represented using a selection of three cards, each with a dedicated action and cardinal direction. Battles use a version of the recurring Active Time Battle (ATB) system; each card has an ATB gauge which charges up, allowing an action to be taken such as attacking enemies or healing Neon when placed in the action slot. An associated mechanic is changing the battle theme, which both alters how fast different cards recharge and impacts their power. A key element of battle is Neon being able to change her abilities using a job system. When changing job, Neon shifts her costume and accesses a different set of abilities. Jobs are unlocked by accruing a resource called Skill Points (SP), with new job cards unlocking once Neon reaches an SP threshold.

== Synopsis ==
=== Setting and characters ===
Sigma Harmonics is set in an alternate version of Tokyo. In ancient times when the gods overtly influenced humanity, demonic forces terrorised the world. The gods empowered some human families with magical abilities, dubbing them as "Servants". These Servant families successfully sealed the demons, using an artifact called the Great Clock as the lock. The entire scenario takes place in the Kurogami family mansion, which changes depending on the time period and current events. A key mechanic and plot point is the alteration of time by killing someone, causing a ripple effect forward through time.

The main protagonists are Sigma Kurogami and Neon Tsukiyumi, high school students, childhood friends, and the heirs to two Servant families; Sigma has the power to traverse time and influence reality through song, while Neon can fight demons through divine possession and the use of magical cards. The key characters include members of the Kurogami family, who appear as either victims or suspects across the various timelines; Dixon and Christie, a pair of demons released from the Great Clock who act as major antagonists; Rin Yukiha, a detective who appears across timelines; and the Man in Black, a figure who repeatedly appears before Sigma.

=== Plot ===
Sigma is accosted one day by the mysterious Man in Black, and upon returning home finds the world changed for the worse and no-one recognising him except for Neon. The two discover that someone has released demons from the Great Clock and this caused a change in time. Using his power and the Great Clock, Sigma travels with Neon into the past, solving the murder of a household member, which is also being investigated by different versions of Rin Yukiha. With each murder mystery, another is committed, with the culprit being a demon disguised as one of the Kurogami clan. The initial masterminds are the two vengeful demons Dixon and Christie, who have been directing events in each timeline. At the close of the fifth mystery, Sigma defeats and returns Dixon and Christie to the Great Clock. At the same time, Neon vanishes from existence, with only Sigma remembering her.

Sigma finds out that the mastermind is Rin Yukiha, who doubled as the Man in Black; his true identity is Rin Housui, the reincarnation of a half-demon created by the family who unwittingly unleashed demons into the world and suffered retribution from the Kurogami clan. Housui reveals and he and Sigma are Tuners, beings created by either the gods or demons to manipulate history, and that Sigma is the product of an alternate timeline. Neon was also a Tuner created to help correct events, and Sigma's success meant she was no longer needed. Through the demons released from the Great Clock, Housui has been manipulating Sigma into creating a timeline where demonic forces are victorious and the Kurogami line is extinct. Sigma, with help from Neon's lingering spirit and surviving Kurogami members, defeats Housui and uses his Tuner powers to rewrite history a final time, creating a peaceful world for everyone including himself and Neon.

== Development ==
Sigma Harmonics was co-developed by Square Enix and Think Garage; the Square Enix staff members had previously worked on Dirge of Cerberus: Final Fantasy VII, while Think Garage had worked with Square Enix on Dragon Quest & Final Fantasy in Itadaki Street Portable. Hiroki Chiba acted as director and writer, Yoshinori Kitase was producer, and Yusaku Nakaaki was the project's lead artist. It was Chiba's second project as a director, the first being Dynami Tracer for the Satellaview in 1996. Production took roughly two years, said to be long for a DS title, and had a fairly small staff number and budget compared to the company's work on the Final Fantasy series. The game was conceived by Chiba while the team were still providing online support for Dirge of Cerberus. His initial pitch to Kitase was a game that fused mystery adventure with the company's established RPG design.

Chiba enjoyed Shōwa period mystery writers such as Seishi Yokomizo and Rampo Edogawa, and wanted to create a game using that style. The key gameplay and story theme for the title was rewriting the past. The setting's aesthetics were based on Japan in the 1930s and 40s with a fantastical twist. This decision was cemented while Nakaaki was designing the main cast. Referencing his inspiration, Chiba left homages to classic detective story writers in the game, explicitly naming antagonists Dixon and Christie respectively after John Dickson Carr and Agatha Christie. A notable element for Sigma Harmonics considering its platform was the extensive use of voice acting for its cast. The cast included Daisuke Ono (Sigma), Aya Hirano (Neon), Tetsu Inada (Dixon), Mamiko Noto (Christie), and Jun Fukuyama (Rin Yukiha). Hirano in particular had to voice Neon in a variety of ways due to the job changes impacting her personality.

Kitase encouraged the choice of DS for development to properly express the gameplay and narrative concepts proposed by Chiba, while also contrasting with Kitase's previous work for home consoles. The team allotted one gigabit of ROM for the game, splitting it evenly between audio, and game data and illustrations. As production advanced, the team saw the ROM space was insufficient on its own, with Chiba fearing they would need to both cut the game down and reduce sound quality to fit it on the cartridge. To overcome these space problems, the team licensed two middleware tools from CRI Middleware called Savior and File Magic. Savior was used for all the sound design, including the music and voice acting. File Magic, which Chiba heard of by chance, allowed the cutscene illustrations to be compressed with a minimal reduction in quality. The sound designer was Kazuhiro Hosoe, a company veteran who had worked on Final Fantasy XII and the Mana series. Hosoe found his job challenging, as Chiba gave vague instructions on the types of sounds wanted for particular scenarios.

Chiba decided upon the uncommon book-style presentation to both reference his inspirations, and give players an easier time controlling the game. The gameplay systems were chosen so that players could advance through the battles and story sections regardless of whether they found the correct solution to a mystery, though bonuses were given for success. The battle system was compared by Kitase to the style of Final Fantasy VII. Using the company's established Active Time Battle system as a blueprint, Chiba designed the battle system around switching battle themes impacting how Neon fights. The gameplay mechanics ended up being quite complicated, with Chiba earning a reputation during development of retaining as many of his "cool ideas" as possible rather than cutting anything.

The character designs were created by Nakaaki. Having previously worked in a supporting role on Dirge of Cerberus and Crisis Core: Final Fantasy VII, Sigma Harmonics was his first job as lead artist. Chiba chose him as he thought it was "a waste" not to have Nakaaki in a leading design role. Nakaaki drew inspiration for the character and background designs from a photo book on the Showa period, playing into Chiba's initial inspiration behind the story. These early designs were seen by Chiba as too dull, so Nakaaki incorporated further unspecified influences. A notable element of the presentation was that rather than cutscenes using animations, the team used dedicated scrolling backgrounds with overlapped player portraits. The backgrounds were created by Nakaaki and Masahiko Dairaku. Sigma was designed to contrast against other Square Enix protagonists, combining adult-style smartness with a casual appearance more associated with youth. Getting the character expressions right for the 2D sprites was an important part of development. Nakaaki designed the game's logo, incorporating the Greek letter "Σ" as a reference to the main protagonist. The circle referenced both harmonic musical notation, and the clock which formed a key part of the plot.

=== Music ===
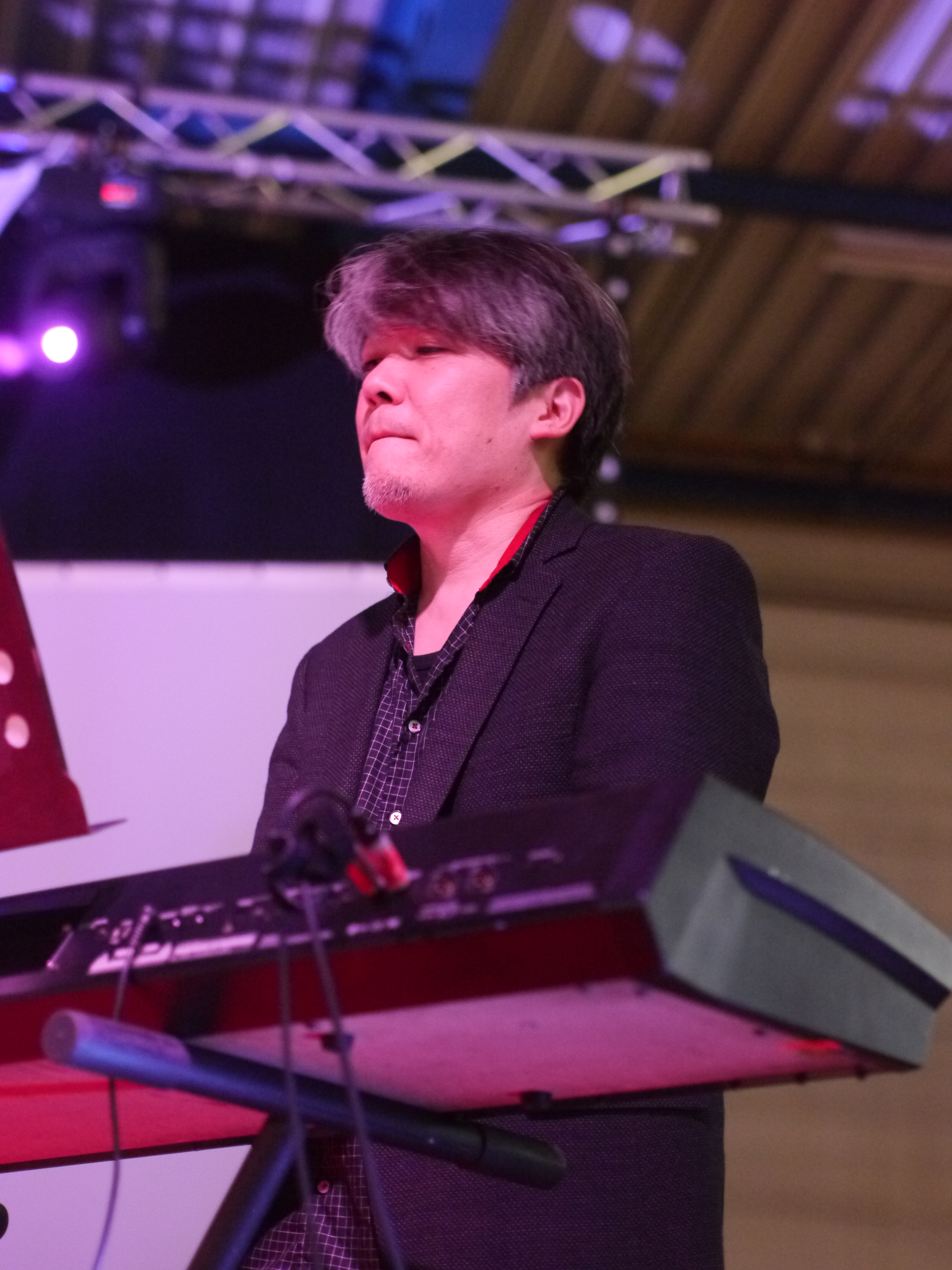
Hamauzu (pictured 2012) composed, co-produced, and co-arranged the music.

The music of Sigma Harmonics was composed by Masashi Hamauzu, who worked on Dirge of Cerberus, entries in the SaGa series, and was then working on the music for Final Fantasy XIII. Hamauzu co-produced and co-arranged the score with Mitsuto Suzuki; Suzuki was a new arrival at the company, and Sigma Harmonics was his first major role in game music. For his work, Hamauzu drew inspiration from the game's design document, its gameplay and narrative theme of rewriting the past, and Nakaaki's character illustrations. While there was a definite setting and tone, Hamauzu was not restricted by it, incorporating orchestral, synthesizer and piano elements into the score. Hamauzu's work on Sigma Harmonics overlapped with that of Final Fantasy XIII.

Each piece of music was created based on requests from the development team, saying where and why the piece was needed. A problem with the soundtrack was maintaining CD-quality sound within the DS's limited ROM, as Hamauzu did not create MIDI versions. So the Savior sound tool could be used best, Hamauzu and Suzuki wrote the music so that it would sound normal within a compressed 16 kHz sound environment, limiting audio feedback. Hamauzu admitted that he composed the music as he liked without thinking of technical constraints, which caused issues with the available space. A notable element for Hamauzu was creating multiple battle themes for Neon's different outfits.

The score included a live violin role performed by Hijiri Kuwano, a recurring collaborator of Hamauzu's. The use of a live stringed instrument, a recurring element of Hamauzu's scores, was possible due to the use of sound streaming. Due to space limitations, some completed tracks had to be cut from the game. Other tracks that remained needed to be shortened, which Suzuki deeply regretted. Hamauzu remembered it as one of his favorite projects due to its positive working atmosphere. The ending theme, "Harmonia vita", was inspired by the game's narrative. It was performed by Neon's voice actress Aya Hirano, composed and arranged by Shinya Saito, with lyrics by Aki Hata.

The original version of "Harmonia vita" was released as part of Hirano's debut album Riot Girl, released on July 16, 2008 by Lantis. A soundtrack album was released on September 24. The album included full versions of pieces shortened for the game, cut musical tracks, and pieces used exclusively for advertising. The cover art was created by Nakaaki. A track from the game, "Hope Giving 'Dance of the Dog Howl'", was included in a promotional sample CD given out at the 2008 Tokyo Game Show in October. "Hope Giving 'Dance of the Dog Howl'" was later released in a remixed form as part of Military Tune, an album of remixes by noted DJs in 2010.

== Release ==
Sigma Harmonics was announced in March 2008. At the time of its announcement, it was said to be 60% complete. The game's title was a combined creation of Chiba, who used the protagonist's first name, and Nakaaki, who suggested the "Harmonics" title based on the project's music-based themes. The title also tied into the game's narrative. It was presented in playable form by Square Enix at their DKΣ3713 event in early August that year. It appeared alongside a playable version of Dissidia Final Fantasy, and trailers for The 3rd Birthday and multiple products within the Final Fantasy and Kingdom Hearts franchises. A summer holiday-themed scenario initially unique to the event was used for the demo. The game was released on August 21, 2008.

During the run-up to release, a five-part audio drama covering the story's opening events was published through the game's website. As a limited pre-order incentive, a bonus DVD was produced by Square Enix; the DVD included unique artwork, the full audio drama, and full versions of promotional commercials which combined gameplay footage with anime sequences. The anime sections for the commercials were created by Sanzigen. The anime production was prompted by the staff's popular opinion that Nakaaki's sketches would translate well to the medium. A strategy guide was released by Enterbrain in September; and a guidebook with behind-the-scenes material was published by ASCII Media Works in October.

The title was ported to mobile phones under the title Sigma Harmonics Coda. It released for i-mode and EZweb on January 28, 2010, and for Yahoo! Keitai on February 8 the same year. All versions included the scenario used for the DKΣ3713 demo, and adapted the presentation for a single screen. The port was developed by Digital Wares. It was shut down in 2018 with the ending of Square Enix's old mobile services. Sigma Harmonics remains unreleased outside Japan, a fact attributed to its heavy use of Japanese pop culture references. Chiba later expressed regret at the lack of a Western release.

== Reception ==
Reception

Review scores
Publication	Score
Famitsu	31/40
RPGamer	3.5/5

The game debuted on the Japanese sales charts at number 8, selling 23,000 units. It was only one of three new entries in the charts that week. As of September 2008, the game has sold 70,000 units in Japan, ranking among Square Enix's best-selling titles for that year from new IPs.

In a preview of the game, John Tanaka of IGN noted the unconventional design of the battle system. Jeremy Parish, writing for 1Up.com, positively compared the game to The World Ends with You and said that its blending of genres gave Sigma Harmonics "a distinctly unique feel".

Joystiq's Sachi Coxon, giving praise to the gameplay mechanics in an article shortly after release, called the game "one to keep an eye on" for genre fans. In a feature focused on Japanese games, Nick Des Barres of North American magazine Play positively compared the title to more experimental games from the PlayStation era such as Einhänder and Vagrant Story, giving praise to its setting and gameplay mechanics and noting the originality of its deduction system.

Japanese gaming magazine Famitsu praised its gameplay mechanics as standing out from other RPGs at the time, though one reviewer found the process of collection information for deductions tedious. Michael Baker of RPGamer gave praise to the premise, soundtrack and battle system; his main faults were the lack of diversity in locations and the game's non-standard presentation using the DS's book mode. Yip Spencer of Siliconera enjoyed the combination of investigation mechanics with boss difficulty and the battle mechanics, but noted that its heavy text usage and focus on Japanese styling made possible localization challenging.
