= Dragon Quest Swords =

2007 video game

Dragon Quest Swords: The Masked Queen and the Tower of Mirrors
- North American box art
- Developers: Genius Sonority; Eighting
- Publisher: Square Enix
- Director: Takatsugu Nagayama
- Producer: Ryutaro Ichimura
- Designer: Yuji Horii
- Artists: Akira Toriyama; James Turner
- Writer: Yuji Horii
- Composer: Manami Matsumae
- Series: Dragon Quest
- Platform: Wii
- Release: JP: July 12, 2007; NA: February 19, 2008; AU: May 8, 2008; EU: May 9, 2008
- Genre: Role-playing first person
- Modes: Single-player, multiplayer

Dragon Quest Swords: The Masked Queen and the Tower of Mirrors (Note: ドラゴンクエストソード 仮面の女王と鏡の塔 (Doragon Kuesto Sōdo: Kamen no Joō to Kagami no Tō)) is a role-playing video game developed by Genius Sonority and Eighting and published by Square Enix for the Wii game console. The game is a spin-off from the Dragon Quest series, and was first released in Japan in July 2007, and worldwide the following year.

== Gameplay ==
=== Battle system ===
Dragon Quest Swords utilizes an on-rails first-person battle system. However, instead of a gun, Dragon Quest Swords uses the functions of the Wii Remote as a sword and a shield. The direction of a sword slash or thrust is dependent on the direction the player sways the Wii Remote. The player can also set the focal point for their sword attacks by pointing with the Wii Remote and pushing A. While holding down the B button, the Wii Remote cursor is replaced by a shield. The shield can block any enemy attack if the player points it at the point of impact, which is indicated by red, blue, or yellow markings. Attacks with blue markings can also be repelled by striking them with the sword, which knocks them back at the enemy. If properly timed, the ricocheted attack will damage the enemy; if the timing is slightly off, the attack will miss the enemy, possibly destroying their cover instead.

A special attack, called a master stroke, can be used once the special attack gauge is filled. The gauge is filled by hitting enemies, hitting projectiles back at them, or blocking attacks. When the player initiates a master stroke, they must perform a brief quick time event in which they mimic the motions of the stroke. If the player fails the quick time event, the master stroke is cancelled and the special attack gauge drops down to 90%. Master strokes are learned by tempering swords and getting new swords, while buddy strokes are obtained from the player's current partner. A buddy stroke is a master stroke that can only be performed once that ally has gotten to a certain level, along with being with the hero.

There is no game over in Dragon Quest Swords. Upon defeat, the player character is returned to town and loses half their money and any newly acquired items, but retains all the experience points they gained. The player can also return to town by choice if they are not in battle, in which case they keep all their money and items as well as the experience points.

To temper a sword, the player requires a large sum of money and a specific set of rare materials that can be found in the game's stages.

Only the hero's allies (Anlace, Fleurette and Claymore) can cast magic and only one of them can accompany the hero at a time. The player can set the allies' AI to one of four settings, and can have them cast a specific spell at any time by bringing up the menu.

As in most on rails games, monsters always appear in the same order, in the same place, and players are scored according to their overall accuracy and chains of successful hits. Unlike most on rails games, however, in most stages the player does not advance automatically, allowing them to set their own pace.

Players can increase their character's attack strength and endurance by the usual RPG methods of defeating enemies for experience points and equipping better weapons and armor.

=== Stages ===
There are ten specific areas in this game. The eight story mode areas, the second half of the eighth area, and the Olde Reflectory. After finishing story mode, a set of warps are unlocked in the Olde Reflectory. They lead to many bosses that were not in the story mode, along with stronger versions of some story mode bosses.

=== Minigames ===
Dragon Quest Swords includes several minigames. They can be played alone, or with up to three friends, at Stiletto's shop in town. There are 3 dart games, in which the player uses the shield to catch darts, with different areas of the shield being worth different numbers of points. There are 3 games where the object is to slay all the slimes as fast as possible. Each of the six games awards different prizes, based on points. The prize categories are for B, A, S, and X rank, with X being the highest. There is also a tombola minigame at the item shop.

== Story ==
The game is set in the kingdom of Avalonia. Five years have passed since the defeat of Xiphos, the Death Bringer. Prince Anlace is concerned by the recent behavior of the queen; she insists upon wearing a mask at all times and, claiming to be unwell, refuses to see anyone, including her son. When she secretly heads off to the Galantyne Glades, Anlace asks Claymore, one of the warriors who defeated Xiphos, to help him follow her. Claymore refuses for fear of offending the queen, but allows his son, who has just turned sixteen, to go in his stead.

Claymore's son (the player character) and Anlace observe the queen leave a hut deep in the Glades. The hut's resident, Fleurette, tells them the queen came looking for her brother Aruval, another of the warriors who defeated Xiphos. Following Xiphos's defeat, Aruval contracted a strange malady and Fleurette, who had been training to be a nun, left for a life of seclusion so she could help him. Her magic could not cure Aruval, and he left without saying where he was going. Fleurette belatedly remembers she saw the mask the Queen wears while lost in Arondight Heights as a child. Intuiting that the queen knows Aruval's whereabouts, she goes to the castle to confront her, but is denied an audience. She instead asks the player character to help her investigate Arondight Heights. There she finds the carving she saw as a child on a mountainside. Though she did not know its meaning then, she now recognizes that it depicts Xiphos wearing the mask. She concludes that the mask is possessing the Queen.

They head back to town to warn the people, but while there reports come in of a monster in the Secace Seacove. Claymore and his son volunteer to deal with it. They defeat the monster, but Fleurette arrives and implores them not to kill it. She says that the monster is Aruval. She tries convincing Aruval to return home, but he has little control of himself and flees into the water. The group returns and learns that the Queen has entered the Tower of Mirrors. They pursue her to the top, where they find her activating a portal in a mirror. The hero cuts her mask in two. However, this actually releases Xiphos's soul, which the queen had been containing with the mask ever since she realized Xiphos was taking control of her. Fleurette realizes that the carving actually depicts a group of heroes forcing the mask onto Xiphos's face. Xiphos explains that the moment before his defeat five years ago, he separated his soul from his body and implanted it within the heroes who defeated him. He leaves the queen's body and raises a castle surrounded by a sea of lava to be his new residence.

Lacking a means of reaching Xiphos, the heroes decide to focus on restoring the mask. Dao, Claymore's old teacher, says the mask was made in the Mirror World, which can be reached through the Tower of Mirrors. They enter the Mirror World and meet its guardian, Draug. Draug not only repairs the mask, but gives the player character the Rednusadner, a powerful sword that can open the way to Xiphos's castle. Dao teaches him the Figure of Fate, a technique of the Rednusadner which he uses to open a path in the sea of lava. The party makes their way through the sea of lava and the castle to Xiphos. Xiphos has captured Aruval and draws out the part of his soul he had implanted in him. This restores Aruval to normal and gives Xiphos physical form. The party attacks Xiphos and subdues him long enough to place the mask on him. It turns Xiphos into a statue, which the player character shatters with a blow from the Rednusadner. Xiphos's castle starts to crumble. During the party's escape, the hero accidentally drops the mask into the sea of lava. Back in Avalonia, a great party is held in the hero's honor. He makes his way to a balcony and raises the Rednusadner to the sky, causing all the citizens to cheer.

== Development ==
Originally planned to be a launch game for the Wii, Dragon Quest Swords was released on July 12, 2007, in Japan. The game was released in North America on February 19, 2008. Under the spotlight of E3 2006 and in an unprecedented show of software support for a Nintendo console, Square Enix revealed that Dragon Quest Swords and Final Fantasy Crystal Chronicles: The Crystal Bearers would be exclusive Wii titles. In a company press release, executive producer Yuu Miyake stated:

Since 1986 the Dragon Quest series has gained acceptance around the world, and has been a staple of the videogame industry. We believe its appeal lies in simplicity that anyone can enjoy, and the excitement of becoming a hero in an epic adventure. With the Nintendo (Wii), we believe that these aspects of the Dragon Quest experience can be taken to a whole new level of fun and interaction.

The Dragon Quest Swords development team includes many of the original designers of Enix's flagship series. Creator Yuji Horii was one of the first game designers Nintendo president Satoru Iwata approached with the prototype Revolution controller. Horii contributed a video interview to Nintendo's Tokyo Game Show 2005 Revolution press conference. In it, he talked about making games accessible to a greater market, and cutting to the essence of "fun." When asked about Nintendo's Wii Remote, Horii stated "I agree that many interesting games can be created using this controller, but I still think that Nintendo would probably make the best games."

According to video game website IGN, Square Enix representatives have branded Dragon Quest Swords a sequel to Kenshin Dragon Quest, a motion-activated plug-and-play TV game. In a detailed preview of Dragon Quest Swords, IGN speculated that the game mechanics will be similar to those featured in Kenshin. A short teaser video of a first-person perspective battle sequence appeared to confirm IGN's speculation as the onscreen protagonist mimicked the sword fighting antics of the Revolution Remote wielder. Furthermore, Square Enix stated in a press release that the game "is being developed with every aspect of the unique Wii hardware in mind." Square-Enix would later announce extra features for the North American version, such as a playback mode and four hidden bosses. The localization follows the style of other recent releases in the Dragon Quest series from Square Enix. Notably, the same team responsible for the English translation of Dragon Quest VIII, Plus Alpha Translations, is listed among the translators in the ending staff roll.

=== Music ===
A soundtrack was released on August 22, 2007, with music composed and arranged by Manami Matsumae. Series regular Koichi Sugiyama did not contribute to the game, however some of his previous themes were re-arranged by Matsumae. For this, Sugiyama received a co-composing credit with Matsumae in the staff roll.

== Reception ==
Reception

Aggregate score
Aggregator	Score
Metacritic	65/100

The game sold 305,000 units in Japan in its first week according to Media Create. It has sold 490,000 units in Japan and 110,000 copies in North America as of August 2008.

Famitsu gave the game a score of 33/40 (8, 8, 8, 9). The game has mixed reviews, according to review aggregator Metacritic.
