= Think Garage =

Japanese video game developer

Think Garage Ltd.
- Native name

Japanese name
- Kanji: 有限会社 シンクガレージ
Transcriptions
- Revised Hepburn: Yuugengaisha Shinkugarēji
- Founded: July 2005; 21 years ago
- Headquarters: Shinjuku, Tokyo, Japan
- Number of employees: 20 (2008)
- Website: thinkgarage.co.jp

Think Garage Ltd. (有限会社 シンクガレージ, Yuugengaisha Shinkugarēji) is a Japanese video game development studio based in Shinjuku, Tokyo. It was founded on the 29th of July, 2005 under 2 dozen people as of 2024. Think Garage has primarily acted as a support studio for games published by Square Enix and SEGA.

== Video games ==
- Dragon Quest & Final Fantasy in Itadaki Street Portable (May 2006), board game on PlayStation Portable
- Itadaki Street DS (June 2007), board game on Nintendo DS
- Lord of Vermilion (June 2008), strategy game on arcade
- Sigma Harmonics (August 2008), role-playing game on Nintendo DS
