= Lord of Vermilion =

- Developer: Think Garage
- Publisher: Square Enix
- Composers: Nobuo Uematsu; Hitoshi Sakimoto; Tachytelic
- Platform: Arcade
- Release: JP: June 17, 2008
- Genre: Fantasy collectible card game
- Arcade system: Taito Type X^{2} Satellite Terminal

Lord of Vermilion (ロード・オブ・ヴァーミリオン, Rōdo obu Vāmirion) is an arcade-based fantasy collectible card game developed by Think Garage and distributed by Square Enix in which players control combat cards on an arcade play surface. The objective of the game is to destroy the enemy team's Arcana Stones and eliminate their servants in order to win the game. Players design and develop avatars, increasing their statistics and obtaining equipment, then compete with each other locally, or online, or play the single player story mode.

As of November 2008, Lord of Vermilion has contributed over ¥4 billion in earnings for Square Enix.

A sequel, Lord of Vermilion II, was released in Japan on October 27, 2009, and was followed up by Lord of Vermilion Re:2 on July 26, 2011. The sequels prominently featured collaborations with a number of other franchises and game series, including the Final Fantasy, Romancing SaGa, Magic: The Gathering, The King of Fighters, Touhou and BlazBlue.

It has also spawned a spin-off franchise of action RPG titles for the PlayStation Portable and PlayStation Vita, including Lord of Arcana and Lord of Apocalypse.

Another sequel, Lord of Vermilion III, was released on August 22, 2013.

A free-to-play third-person action multiplayer online battle arena (MOBA), Lord of Vermilion Arena, was officially launched on June 17, 2015. The servers were closed on June 30, 2016.

In Final Fantasy XIV a parody real-time strategy (RTS) game using in-game minions called "Lord of Verminion" was made in reference and parody to Lord of Vermilion on November 10, 2015.

A fourth installment, Lord of Vermilion IV, was released in July 2017. Another arcade release for up to eight players, it featured music by Taku Iwasaki.

== Gameplay ==
The player controls up to 4 units on the field at one time including the player's avatar and up to 90 total cost of units at one time. When a unit dies it must be returned to the inactive area and after a set amount of time it can be used again. Active units can only be switched in and out while the players units are in the gate area. Players can damage enemy arcane crystals, the search eye, the crystal shield or gates by putting their units in the associated area as long as no enemies are present. Players can also damage the arcane crystals by destroying all of the opponents units that are on the field.

== Story ==
In ancient times, before the creation of the worlds, there lived a God. He opened his heart and brought forth a vermilion stone in order to create seven different worlds. Whosoever held the vermilion stone held the power to create worlds, and would reign over the seven worlds as a god, the "Lord of Vermilion". The seven worlds existed side by side in harmony for millennia, their inhabitants separated by boundaries and unable to interfere with one another... until the "Great Collapse".

The lord of the human world, consumed by ambition, sought to use the forbidden magic of the vermilion stone, called the "Arcana", in order to become a god. However, he was unable to wield the power and the Arcana was shattered into seven pieces and scattered amongst the seven worlds, destroying their boundaries. The six worlds were drawn into the human world and they merged. With the six races of the six worlds thrust into the human world, chaos and war broke out.

Ages later, the world, called the "Land of Acheron", is still in turmoil. The six "Lords" of the six races sow strife across the land, warring for each other's Arcana. The player takes the role of a legendary warrior who holds the seventh Arcana and seeks to obtain the Arcana and upset the balance of the world, gathering an army of "Familiars" who hold faith in the legend of the "Lord of Vermilion".

== Contributing artists ==
To date, contributing guest artists include:

- Ryosuke Aiba
- Shiro Amano
- Yoshitaka Amano
- Toshiyuki Itahana
- Ryoma Itō
- Atsushi Ōkubo
- Yūsuke Kozaki
- Hiroaki Samura
- Jun Suemi
- Shou Tajima
- Shinobu Tanno
- Katsuya Terada
- Yusuke Naora
- Tetsuya Nomura
- Hideo Minaba
- Akihiko Yoshida
- Sana Takeda
- Kazushi Hagiwara
- Kimihiko Fujisaka
- Shunya Yamashita
- Ittoku
- Kou
- Takashi Kojo
- Kinu Komada
- Yamamune
- Yoshio Sugiura
- Satoru Senda
- Hideaki Takamura
- Yoko Tsukamoto
- Miho Midorikawa
- D-SUZUKI
- Nottsuo
- Kim Hyung-tae
- Todd McFarlane
- Yang Kyung-il
- Park Seong-wo
- Anji Majima
- Rin Kususaga
- Ferrari Roberto
- Daisuke Ezawa
- Kou Yoshinari
- Yoh Yoshinari
- Yoshitoshi ABe
- Harunoichi
- Toshiaki Takayama
- Yuichi Maekawa
- Tomatika
- Kami Imai
- KEI
- Masaki Hirooka
- Katsumi Enami
- Mikio Masuda
- Yana Toboso
- Ugetsu Hakua
- Takehito Harada
- Masahiro Ito
