= Dragon Quest & Final Fantasy in Itadaki Street Portable =

2006 video game

- Japanese box art
- Developer: Think Garage
- Publisher: Square Enix
- Director: Toshiyuki Uehara
- Producer: Yasuhito Watanabe
- Artist: Daisuke Karasawa
- Composer: Hayato Matsuo
- Series: Itadaki Street
- Platform: PlayStation Portable
- Release: JP: May 25, 2006
- Genres: Party game, board game
- Modes: Single-player, multiplayer

Dragon Quest & Final Fantasy in Itadaki Street Portable (Japanese: ドラゴンクエスト&ファイナルファンタジー in いただきストリート ポータブル, Hepburn: Doragon Kuesuto & Fainaru Fantajī in Itadaki Sutorīto Pōtaburu) is a crossover party board video game in the long running Itadaki Street series. The game is notable for its inclusion of characters from the Final Fantasy and Dragon Quest series of video games, being the second in the series to do so, the first being 2004's Dragon Quest & Final Fantasy in Itadaki Street Special for the PlayStation 2. Itadaki Street Portable was developed by Think Garage and published by Square Enix for the PlayStation Portable in Japan on May 25, 2006. As with other entries in the series prior to it, was not released in any other regions.

== Gameplay ==
The game plays similarly to the board game Monopoly and party game Mario Party. Mini games occur in the game, although they are not the main focus, and many are either based on luck or very simple interactions. In the game, the player selects a character, of which originates from a Final Fantasy or Dragon Quest video game, and directs them through a game board by taking turns in rolling dice. When a character lands on an open space, they may purchase it to be their own, and when another player stops on it, they must pay a fee to the character who owns it. Other spaces allow various other actions for the player to choose to participate in with their money as well, including the option to invest them in a stock market, keep money safe in banks, or gamble money in a casino. The end goal is to either bankrupt all other players, or earn a preset amount of money. Winning games leads to earning "coins", which in turn, can be used to unlock extra characters or boards.

== Characters ==
The game contains 16 different playable characters at the game's start; eight from Final Fantasy, and eight from Dragon Quest. An additional eight, four from each franchise, can be unlocked upon accomplishing various feats in the game.

Final Fantasy

Character	Game
Cloud	Final Fantasy VII
Tifa	Final Fantasy VII
Aerith	Final Fantasy VII
Zidane	Final Fantasy IX
Vaan	Final Fantasy XII
Penelo	Final Fantasy XII
Ashe	Final Fantasy XII
Balthier	Final Fantasy XII
Sephiroth	Final Fantasy VII

Dragon Quest

Character	Game
Alena	Dragon Quest IV
Maya	Dragon Quest IV
Meena	Dragon Quest IV
Bianca	Dragon Quest V
Jessica	Dragon Quest VIII
Yangus	Dragon Quest VIII
Angelo	Dragon Quest VIII
Slime	Dragon Quest
Marcello	Dragon Quest VIII

== Development ==
The game was first announced in a February 2006 issue of Shonen Jump magazine, for a release in "Spring 2006". While the game was designed to look and play similarly to Dragon Quest & Final Fantasy in Itadaki Street Special, it is not a port, but rather a new game with more boards and characters. The game was released in Japan on May 25, 2006, but not in any other regions. The game was released as Square Enix's Ultimate Hits with Valkyrie Profile: Lenneth on March 6, 2008, in Japan.

== Reception ==
The game received mixed reviews. IGN felt it was a solid game that didn't use its licenses well, stating that it "stands on its own without the Dragon Quest and Final Fantasy connection...Square Enix's two biggest franchises don't really add much to the experience. While it's nice seeing your favorite Final Fantasy and Dragon Quest characters...the licenses aren't put to use as well as one would expect of a true crossover game (see Smash Bros. for an example)". Conversely, Siliconera recommended it more for fans of the respective series, Final Fantasy and Dragon Quest, than for fans of party games, opining that "...when the game was conceived it was designed with fans of Square Enix titles in mind. Instead of improving on the Itadaki formula, the game makes its mark mainly because of the mascot characters. As a party game...you're more likely to turn it off after a few turns in favor of a faster party game." In a later playtest by Siliconera comparing the two handheld video game console versions of the game at the time, Itadaki Street Portable and Nintendo DS iteration of the series, and came to the conclusion that "Itadaki Street Portable is really best for mature gamers with a lot of friends who live nearby and are willing to also invest in a copy to play. Itadaki Street DS is more of a general audiences title, where anyone could pick it up, play and enjoy". In Japanese, magazine Famitsu give game a 32/40.

The game sold relatively well, being the fourth best-selling game in Japan in its release week, and staying in the top ten the following week as well. However, sales stalled around 110,000 copies sold, far less than the iteration Itadaki Street for PlayStation 2, which sold over 380,000 copies, or the Nintendo DS iteration, which sold over 413,000 copies. The Ultimate Hits version has sold about 40,000 copies.
