= Death By Cube =

2010 video game

- Developer: Premium Agency
- Publisher: Square Enix
- Platform: Xbox 360
- Release: January 20, 2010
- Genre: Multidirectional shooter
- Mode: Single-player

Death By Cube (デス バイキューブ, Desu Bai Kyūbu) is a twin-stick shooter released on the Xbox Live Arcade service on January 20, 2010. It was developed by Premium Agency and published by Square Enix.

== Gameplay ==
The game uses a top-down visual scheme. Players assume control over the amnesiac robot Leo, controlling his movement using the left thumb stick and aiming and firing using the right thumb stick. Additionally, a dash move can be executed using the left trigger and a shield can be deployed using the right trigger. The player must eliminate all of the enemies on the map, many of which are cube shaped, while avoiding getting hit by projectiles fired by the enemies. Enemies that are killed explode into large gushes of blood-like red oil. Some levels have additional objectives, such as defending a base or surviving with only one life. Players acquire computer chips, the form of in-game currency, by performing well enough in a level to receive a bronze, silver, or gold rating. Chips are spent on upgrades to Leo or to unlock additional levels.

== Development ==
Yosuke Shiokawa cited Heavy Weapon as an inspiration for the game. The team was not big enough to release the game on multiple platforms. This, combined with the facts that the team did not have market information on either the PlayStation Network or Wiiware, led to the decision to make the title an Xbox Live Arcade exclusive. The title was created by Square's western branch, as the title was designed with a western audience in mind. According to Shiokawa the final title was "born jokingly" although Shiokawa has admitted to not seeing the humor in it.

== Reception ==
Reception

Aggregate score
Aggregator	Score
Metacritic	56/100

Review scores
Publication	Score
1Up.com	D
The A.V. Club	B
Edge	6/10
Eurogamer	3/10
GameSpot	4/10
IGN	4.9/10
Jeuxvideo.com	13/20
Official Xbox Magazine (US)	6/10
TeamXbox	7.7/10
Teletext GameCentral	7/10

Prior to its release, Death By Cube was set up for demo play at the Square Enix booth of the 2009 Tokyo Game Show, where several reviewers commented on the game as being exceptionally bloody. Kotaku Australia's Stephen Totilo praised the game for requiring more strategy than other twin stick shooters, and remarked that "This little game might well have been the bloodiest game at the Tokyo Game Show".

Death By Cube received "mixed" reviews according to the review aggregation website Metacritic. Critics took issues with multiple aspects of the game, including wildly fluctuating difficulty levels, a threadbare plot, poor visuals, and that additional levels had to be unlocked by grinding through the initial levels. Brett Todd of GameSpot summarized the game by saying that "While the action can be gratifyingly frenetic for a few minutes here and there, the overall game design is simplistic and repetitive, the varying difficulty is incredibly frustrating, and the look and sound of the game are too primitive to hold your attention for long."

Since its release, the game sold 10,020 units worldwide by January 2011. Sales of the game moved up to 12,131 units by the end of 2011.
