= Kenshin Dragon Quest =

2003 video game

Kenshin Dragon Quest: Yomigaerishi Densetsu no Ken
- Packaging
- Developer: SSD Co.
- Publisher: Square Enix
- Producer: Ryutaro Ichimura
- Artist: Akira Toriyama
- Writer: Fuminori Ishikawa
- Composer: Koichi Sugiyama
- Series: Dragon Quest
- Platform: Television game
- Release: JP: September 19, 2003
- Genre: Adventure
- Mode: Single-player

Kenshin Dragon Quest: Yomigaerishi Densetsu no Ken is an all-in-one television game created by Square Enix, based on the Dragon Quest video game series that connects to a person's television set and does not require a separate video game console.

== Gameplay and features ==
A battle screenshot

In order to play, the player uses a toy sword as their game controller to walk (by pointing forward), to fight off monsters, defend with your shield, cast spells, and for every other input needed by the system. Slashing the sword in different directions (horizontal, diagonal, vertical) by the player will cause different effects and damage to enemies encountered in the game world. The game's ROM is located on an item that resembles a shield. To save a game in process, the person must use a memory card that looks like a book, which is inserted into the shield.

This game is classified as Adventure, and not a traditional Role-playing game. This is because most of the game is set on a predetermined path that you can only travel in one direction, with few exceptions of side paths. Enemy encounters are set at predetermined locations and formations. This is in contrast to a Role-playing game focusing on dungeon crawling and open exploration.

The monsters encountered are the standard variety from Dragon Quest titles, including slimes, moles and skeleton knights. There are special bosses that reside at the end of each chapter. As the player builds up successful attacks and blocks with their shield, they build up a super meter. When this is completed, the player is enabled to unleash a powerful attack.

== Plot ==
Kenshin Dragon Quest takes place in the world of Alefgard, the same world as the first Dragon Quest. The quest explores areas similar to the main storyline from Dragon Quest. The main quest goals are saving Princess Laura and defeating the evil King Dragon, all while using the Erdrick's Sword.

The quest is broken into eight chapters that take you throughout all of the locations in Alefgard, many being the same as in Dragon Quest. Eventually, the hero will put together the same rainbow bridge as in Dragon Quest, before he makes his way into the final castle, where he faces off against the King Dragon. The game includes a few mini-games, including a Slime Crisis game that would later be seen in Dragon Quest Swords.

== Reception ==
Over 300,000 pre-orders of Kenshin Dragon Quest were made prior to the game's release in Japan. By the close of the fiscal year ending March 31, 2004, more than half a million units of the game were shipped in Japan. The game was presented with a Special Award at the 8th Annual CESA Game Awards in 2004.

== Legacy ==
Kenshin's spiritual sequel is Dragon Quest Swords, which uses the Wii Remote as a controller instead of a sword. The game's XaviX processor and sensor technologies were also used in other standalone video games, including Tiger Electronics' The Lord of the Rings: Warrior of Middle Earth in 2003 and Star Wars Saga Edition Lightsaber Battle Game.
