= Itadaki Street =

Video game series

- North American cover of the 2011 video game Fortune Street
- Genre: Board game
- Developer: Various
- Publishers: ASCII (1991); Enix (1994-2002); Square Enix (2004-present); Nintendo (Wii, INT)
- Creator: Yuji Horii
- Platforms: Family Computer, Super Famicom, PlayStation, PlayStation 2, PlayStation Portable, Nintendo DS, Wii, Android, iOS, PlayStation 4, PlayStation Vita
- First release: Itadaki Street: Watashi no Omise ni Yottette; March 21, 1991
- Latest release: Itadaki Street: Dragon Quest and Final Fantasy 30th Anniversary; October 19, 2017

Itadaki Street (いただきストリート, Itadaki Sutorīto) is a party video game series originally created by Dragon Quest designer Yuji Horii. It is currently owned by Square Enix. The first game was released in Japan on Nintendo's Famicom console in 1991. Since then, new installments in the series have been released for the Super Famicom, PlayStation, PlayStation 2, PlayStation Portable, Nintendo DS, Mobile Phones, Android, iOS, PlayStation 4 and PlayStation Vita. The series was exclusive to Japan prior to the 2011 Itadaki Street Wii, which was released as Fortune Street in North America and Boom Street in Europe.

== Development ==
In a 1989 interview, Horii stated he was working on a board game with former Famitsu editor Yoshimitsu Shiozaki and that working in a "completely different genre" to the Dragon Quest games was worthwhile. While creating the first stage, a play test revealed the board was really hard, so a practice stage was constructed and was also too difficult, leading to stage one eventually becoming stage four. The game was later incorporated into remakes of Dragon Quest III as a new minigame. In 2011, game creator Yuji Horii stated he had considered bringing Itadaki Street to international audiences.

== Common elements ==
The games are similar to Monopoly: players roll one die to advance around a board, purchase unowned property they land on and earn money when opponents land on the player's property, and draw cards when they land on certain spaces. The games differ from Monopoly in that players can buy and sell stocks of a block, affecting the value of the block's stock by buying or selling that block's stock or by developing a player-owned property of that block which increases the value per share of stock for that block. It is not necessary to own the entire block to develop a property, though controlling more than one property of a block allows the player to develop their properties to larger buildings and collect more from opponents. Players must collect a set of four suits to level up and collect additional gold when they pass the starting position/bank. In most versions, up to four players can compete to win each board. To win, a player must make it back to the bank with the board's required amount, which includes the total value of the player's stocks, property value, and gold on hand. Minigames and a stock market for more experienced players are also featured.

== Games ==
Title	Released	Developer	Publisher	Platform	Notes
Itadaki Street: Watashi no Omise ni Yottette	March 21, 1991	Game Studio; Loginsoft	ASCII	Family Computer	
Itadaki Street 2: Neon Sign wa Bara Iro ni	February 26, 1994	Tomcat System	Enix	Super Famicom	It operates like a junior version of Super Okuman Chouja Game. Instead of the players making purchases and sales completely on their own, the game offers advice for important situations. There are many themes including modern, futuristic, and the map of the world. Players that are controlled by the game's artificial intelligence range from teenagers to senior citizens. Players can move from 1 to 9 squares and must allow collect symbols from playing cards in order to get money from the bank. Casino gambling is also available and it includes Bingo and slot machines. Like in Tower Dream, the game instantly ends if the only human player gets bankrupt in a game involving 3 AI-controlled players and 1 human-controlled player.
Itadaki Street: Gorgeous King	September 23, 1998	Tomcat System	Enix	PlayStation	As of December 2004, the game has sold over 281,000 copies.
Itadaki Street 3 Okumanchouja ni Shite Ageru: Kateikyoushi Tsuki	February 28, 2002	Tamsoft; Crea-Tech	Enix	PlayStation 2	The game has sold 163,659 copies in 2002, and Famitsu magazine scored the game a 32 out of 40.
Dragon Quest & Final Fantasy in Itadaki Street Special	December 22, 2004	Paon	Square Enix	PlayStation 2	One to four players can play at the same time which makes this game different from its predecessors. The game features characters from Dragon Quest and Final Fantasy. As of August 31, 2005, the game has sold 380,000 units in Japan.
Dragon Quest & Final Fantasy in Itadaki Street Portable	May 25, 2006	Think Garage	Square Enix	PlayStation Portable	Dragon Quest & Final Fantasy in Itadaki Street Portable includes characters from Square Enix's Dragon Quest and Final Fantasy video game series, though some reviewers said the franchises did not add much to the game.
Itadaki Street DS	June 21, 2007	Tose; Think Garage	Square Enix	Nintendo DS	Itadaki Street DS includes characters from Square Enix's Dragon Quest series and Nintendo's Super Mario franchises, many of which were redrawn to look younger. The game was the second crossover between Nintendo and Square Enix characters. The game's website featured a character creator mixing Mario and Dragon Quest franchises. The Japanese magazine Famitsu gave the game 36/40 points. The game sold 430,000 copies as of August 2008.
Itadaki Street Mobile	October 1, 2007	Square Enix	Square Enix	Mobile phones	Itadaki Street Mobile included no branded characters from any video game franchise. The game was a simplified version of the series, and before release a demo was made available that included Shell Island, one of the beginners boards.
Dragon Quest & Final Fantasy in Itadaki Street Mobile	July 1, 2010	Square Enix	Square Enix	Mobile phones	Dragon Quest & Final Fantasy in Itadaki Street Mobile features Final Fantasy characters from many different Final Fantasy games including Lightning from Final Fantasy XIII in a chibi art style.
Itadaki Street Wii (いただきストリートWii) Localized in North America as Fortune Street and in Europe as Boom Street	JP: December 1, 2011; NA: December 5, 2011; EU: December 23, 2011; AU: January 5, 2012	Marvelous AQL	Square Enix (JP); Nintendo (INT)	Wii	The game was revealed by Nintendo at E3 2011. It was the first game in the series to be published outside Japan. The game includes characters from the Dragon Quest series and the Mario series.
Itadaki Street for Smartphone (いただきストリート for SMARTPHONE) Localized in North America as Fortune Street Smart and in Europe as Boom Street Smart.	JP: January 23, 2012; WW: May 31, 2012	Square Enix	Square Enix	Android, iOS	In Japan, the game was released for Android devices on January 23, 2012, through the Square Enix Market, and for Apple iOS on March 22 through the App Store. The game was released overseas for iOS on May 31 through the App Store. It does not feature licensed characters from other series such as Dragon Quest, Final Fantasy and Mario.
Itadaki Street: Dragon Quest & Final Fantasy 30th Anniversary	October 19, 2017	Tose	Square Enix	PlayStation 4, PlayStation Vita	

== Reception ==
IGN gave Fortune Street, the series' first English localization in North America, a "Good" rating for its deep board game gameplay but saying it could have been more interactive. Siliconera noted that the introduction of established franchise characters from Final Fantasy, Dragon Quest, and the Mario games' has greatly increased the games popularity and mindshare. Fortune Street, the series' first international release, was greeted with mixed reviews, praising the character selection and deep gameplay, but slighting its lengthy time commitment.

A screenshot from Fortune Street showing Yoshi wishing to be tax exempt briefly circulated online as part of a larger series of Internet memes involving Yoshi committing tax fraud.

== See also ==
- List of Square Enix video game franchises
