= List of Mystery Dungeon video games =

Series of video games

The Mystery Dungeon logo used in Pokémon Mystery Dungeon games.

Mystery Dungeon (Japanese: 不思議のダンジョン, Hepburn: Fushigi no Dungeon) is a series of roguelike video games. Most of the titles were developed by Chunsoft; other titles were developed by different companies with permission from Chunsoft to use the trademark. Koichi Nakamura, founder of Chunsoft and co-creator of the Dragon Quest series, conceived the Mystery Dungeon series as Chunsoft's first original work, basing the design on the game Rogue. Most Mystery Dungeon games center on exploring a dungeon with randomly generated layouts and fighting other characters in those dungeons in a turn-based manner; every time the player performs an action, such as attacking or walking, the opponents also take action.

The first game, Torneko's Great Adventure (1993), stars a shopkeeper character from Dragon Quest IV, and the majority of the games in the franchise similarly feature characters from preexisting series. The games of the Mystery Dungeon series can be largely divided into five groups. One is the Shiren the Wanderer series, which is the only subset to be based on original characters rather than those of other franchises. The other four groups are those related to the Dragon Quest series; those related to the Chocobo series, itself a spin-off of the Final Fantasy series; those related to the Pokémon franchise; and individual spin-off games of other franchises. Of those spin-offs, the Etrian Odyssey series has had a pair of games, while all other spinoffs have been a single game.

The latest Mystery Dungeon game is Shiren the Wanderer: The Mystery Dungeon of Serpentcoil Island in 2024. Prior to that, the franchise had been dormant, with the last game as Etrian Mystery Dungeon 2 in 2017. The Mystery Dungeon games have had varying levels of success. The Pokémon games have had the biggest impact, with the first game in the subseries selling millions of copies. Chocobo's Mystery Dungeon also sold over one million copies.

== Games ==
=== Dragon Quest series ===
Dragon Quest series games
Title	Original release date		
Title	Japan	North America	PAL region
Torneko's Great Adventure	September 19, 1993	none	none
Notes: Released on Super Famicom; Developed and published by Chunsoft; Title translates as Torneko's Great Adventure: Mystery Dungeon (トルネコの大冒険 不思議のダンジョン, Torneko no Daibōken Fushigi no Danjon); First video game in the Mystery Dungeon series; Features Torneko (Taloon, in North America), the merchant from Dragon Quest IV
Torneko: The Last Hope	September 15, 1999	November 15, 2000	none
Notes: Released on PlayStation; Developed by Chunsoft and Matrix Software and published by Enix; Originally released in Japan under the title Dragon Quest Characters: Torneko no Daibōken 2 – Fushigi no Dungeon (ドラゴンクエストキャラクターズ トルネコの大冒険2 不思議のダンジョン, Doragon Kuesuto Kyarakutāzu Torneko no Daibōken 2 Fushigi no Danjon; lit. Dragon Quest Characters: Torneko's Great Adventure 2 – Mystery Dungeon); Features Torneko, the merchant from Dragon Quest IV; Also available on Game Boy Advance (2001, as Dragon Quest Characters: Torneko no Daibōken 2 Advance)
Torneko's Great Adventure 3	October 31, 2002	none	none
Notes: Released on PlayStation 2; Developed by Chunsoft and published by Square Enix; Title translates as Dragon Quest Characters: Torneko's Great Adventure 3 – Mystery Dungeon (ドラゴンクエストキャラクターズ トルネコの大冒険3 不思議のダンジョン, Doragon Kuesuto Kyarakutāzu Toruneko no Daibōken 3 Fushigi no Danjon); Features Torneko, the merchant from Dragon Quest IV, and his son Tipper as playable characters; Ported to the Game Boy Advance in 2004 as Torneko's Great Adventure 3 Advance
Dragon Quest: Young Yangus and the Mystery Dungeon	April 20, 2006	none	none
Notes: Released on PlayStation 2; Developed by Cavia and published by Square Enix; Features a younger Yangus, one of the main characters of Dragon Quest VIII
Dragon Quest: Mystery Dungeon Mobile	August 7, 2006	none	none
Notes: Released for mobile phones; Developed and published by Square Enix
Dragon Quest: More Mystery Dungeon Mobile	September 14, 2009	none	none
Notes: Released for mobile phones; Developed and published by Square Enix

=== Shiren the Wanderer series ===
Shiren the Wanderer games
Title	Original release date		
Title	Japan	North America	PAL region
Mystery Dungeon: Shiren the Wanderer	December 1, 1995	March 4, 2008 (Nintendo DS)	March 20, 2008 (Nintendo DS)
Notes: Released on Super Famicom; Developed and published by Chunsoft; Originally released in Japan under the title lit. Mystery Dungeon 2: Shiren the Wanderer (不思議のダンジョン２のシレン, Fushigi no Dungeon 2: Fūrai no Shiren); Second video game in the Mystery Dungeon series, and the first one to feature all original characters; Also available on Nintendo DS (2006), and smartphones (2019)
BS Fūrai no Shiren Surara wo Sukue	May 1996	none	none
Notes: Broadcast on Satellaview over the course of four week-long episodes; Developed by Chunsoft and published by Nintendo; Title translates as BS Shiren the Wanderer: Save Surala
Shiren the Wanderer GB: Monster of Moonlight Village	November 22, 1996	none	none
Notes: Released on Game Boy; Developed and published by Chunsoft; Originally released in Japan under the title Fushigi no Dungeon: Fūrai no Shiren GB: 〜Tsukikage-mura no Kaibutsu〜 (不思議のダンジョンのシレンGB 〜の〜, Fushigi no Danjon Fūrai no Shiren GB 〜Tsukikage-mura no Kaibutsu〜; lit. Mystery Dungeon: Shiren the Wanderer GB 〜Moonlight Village Monster〜); Also available on Windows (1999, 2002) and Android (2011)
Shiren the Wanderer 2: Shiren's Castle and the Oni Invasion	September 27, 2000	none	none
Notes: Released on Nintendo 64; Developed by Chunsoft and published by Nintendo; Originally released in Japan under the title ''Fushigi no Dungeon: Fūrai no Shiren 2: Oni Shūrai! Shiren-jō! (不思議のダンジョン のシレン2!シレン!, Fushigi no Danjon Fūrai no Shiren 2 Oni Shūrai! Shiren Jō!; lit. Mystery Dungeon: Shiren the Wanderer 2: Demon Invasion! Shiren Castle)
Shiren the Wanderer GB2: Magic Castle of the Desert	July 19, 2001	none	none
Notes: Released on Game Boy Color; Developed and published by Chunsoft; Originally released in Japan under the title Fushigi no Dungeon: Fūrai no Shiren GB2: Sabaku no Majō (不思議のダンジョンのシレンGB2 〜の〜, Fushigi no Danjon Fūrai no Shiren GB2 Sabaku no Majō; lit. Mystery Dungeon: Shiren the Wanderer GB2: Magic Castle of the Desert); Also available on Nintendo DS as Fushigi no Dungeon: Fūrai no Shiren DS2: Sabaku no Majō (2008)
Shiren the Wanderer Gaiden: Asuka the Swordswoman	February 7, 2002	none	none
Notes: Released on Dreamcast; Developed by Neverland and published by Sega; Originally released in Japan under the title Fushigi no Dungeon: Fūrai no Shiren Gaiden: Onna Kenshi Asuka Kenzan!' (のダンジョンのシレンアスカ!, Fushigi no Danjon Fūrai no Shiren Gaiden Onna Kenshi Asuka Kenzan!; lit. Mystery Dungeon: Shiren the Wanderer Side Story: Swordswoman Asuka Arrives!); Also available on Windows (2002)
Shiren Monsters: Netsal	April 22, 2004	none	none
Notes: Released on Game Boy Advance; Developed and published by Chunsoft; Originally released in Japan under the title Shiren Monsters: Nettosaru (シレン・モンスターズ ネットサル); Spin-off of the Shiren the Wanderer series
Shiren the Wanderer	June 5, 2008	February 9, 2010	none
Notes: Released on Wii; Developed by Chunsoft and published by Atlus; Originally released in Japan under the title Fushigi no Dungeon: Fūrai no Shiren 3: Karakuri Yashiki no Nemuri Hime (不思議のダンジョンのシレン3 からくり屋敷の眠り姫, Fushigi no Danjon Fūrai no Shiren 3 Karakuri Yashiki no Nemuri Hime; lit. Mystery Dungeon: Shiren the Wanderer 3: The Sleeping Princess and the Karakuri Mansion); Also available on PlayStation Portable (2010)
Shiren the Wanderer 4: The Eye of God and the Devil's Navel	February 25, 2010	none	none
Notes: Released on Nintendo DS; Developed by Chunsoft and published by Spike; Originally released in Japan under the title Fushigi no Dungeon: Fūrai no Shiren 4: Kami no Hitomi to Akuma no Heso (不思議のダンジョンのシレン4のとのヘソ, Fushigi no Danjon Fūrai no Shiren 4 Kami no Me to Akuma no Heso; Mystery Dungeon: Shiren the Wanderer 4: The Eye of God and the Devil's Navel); Also available on PlayStation Portable (2012)
Shiren the Wanderer: The Tower of Fortune and the Dice of Fate	December 9, 2010	July 26, 2016	July 26, 2016
Notes: Released on Nintendo DS; Developed and published by Chunsoft; Originally released in Japan under the title Fushigi no Dungeon: Fūrai no Shiren 5: Fortune Tower to Unmei no Dice (不思議のダンジョンのシレン5 フォーチュンタワーとのダイス, Fushigi no Danjon Fūrai no Shiren 5 Fōchun Tawā to Unmei no Daisu; lit. Mystery Dungeon: Shiren the Wanderer 5: Fortune Tower and the Dice of Fate); Also available on PlayStation Vita (2015), Nintendo Switch and Windows (2020), and smartphones (2022)
Shiren the Wanderer: The Mystery Dungeon of Serpentcoil Island	January 25, 2024	February 27, 2024	February 27, 2024
Notes: Released on Nintendo Switch; Developed and published by Spike Chunsoft; Originally released in Japan under the title Fushigi no Dungeon: Fūrai no Shiren 6: Toguro-jima Tanken Roku (不思議のダンジョンのシレン6 とぐろ, Fushigi no Danjon Fūrai no Shiren 6 Toguro tō Tankenroku; lit. Mystery Dungeon: Shiren the Wanderer 6 - Coil Island Exploration Record); Also available on Microsoft Windows

=== Chocobo series ===
Chocobo series games
Title	Original release date		
Title	Japan	North America	PAL region
Chocobo's Mysterious Dungeon	December 23, 1997	none	none
Notes: Released on PlayStation; Developed and published by Square; Also available on WonderSwan (1999) and PlayStation Network (2010)
Chocobo's Dungeon 2	December 23, 1998	November 30, 1999	none
Notes: Released on PlayStation; Developed and published by Square; Originally released in Japan under the title Chocobo's Dungeon 2 (チョコボの不思議なダンジョン2, Chocobo no Fushigi na Dungeon 2); A WonderSwan Color version was planned but not released; Also available on PlayStation Network (2010)
Final Fantasy Fables: Chocobo's Dungeon	December 13, 2007	July 8, 2008	November 7, 2008
Notes: Released on Wii; Developed by h.a.n.d. and published by Square Enix; Originally released in Japan under the title Chocobo's Mysterious Dungeon: The Labyrinth of Forgotten Time (チョコボの不思議なダンジョン 時忘れの迷宮, Chocobo no Fushigi na Dungeon: Toki Wasure no Meikyū); Enhanced port titled Cid and Chocobo's Mysterious Dungeon: The Labyrinth of Forgotten Time DS+ (Cid to Chocobo no Fushigi na Dungeon Toki Wasure no Meikyū DS+) released on Nintendo DS in Japan on October 30, 2008; Remake titled Chocobo's Mystery Dungeon Every Buddy, including a new buddy system not included in the original, was released on Nintendo Switch and PlayStation 4 in March 2019

=== Pokémon series ===
Pokémon series games
Title	Original release date		
Title	Japan	North America	PAL region
Pokémon Mystery Dungeon: Blue Rescue Team and Pokémon Mystery Dungeon: Red Rescue Team	November 17, 2005	September 18, 2006	November 10, 2006
Notes: Pair of matched games, with Blue released on Nintendo DS and Red on Game Boy Advance; Developed by Chunsoft and published by Nintendo; Originally released in Japan under the titles Pokémon Mystery Dungeon: Blue Rescue Team (ポケモン不思議のダンジョン 青の救助隊, Pokémon Fushigi no Danjon Ao no Kyūjotai) and Pokémon Mystery Dungeon: Red Rescue Team (ポケモン不思議のダンジョン 赤の救助隊, Pokémon Fushigi no Danjon Aka no Kyūjotai); Only slight differences between the two games besides Pokémon exclusive to each game, primarily due to the Nintendo DS's two screens; A remake titled Pokémon Mystery Dungeon: Rescue Team DX was released on the Nintendo Switch on March 6, 2020
Pokémon Mystery Dungeon: Explorers of Time and Explorers of Darkness	September 11, 2007	April 20, 2008	July 4, 2008
Notes: Pair of matched games released on Nintendo DS; Developed by Chunsoft and published by Nintendo; Originally released in Japan under the titles Pokémon Mystery Dungeon: Time Exploration Team (ポケモン不思議のダンジョン 時の探検隊, Pokémon Fushigi no Danjon Toki no Tankentai) and Pokémon Mystery Dungeon: Darkness Exploration Team (ポケモン不思議のダンジョン 闇の探検隊, Pokémon Fushigi no Danjon Yami no Tankentai); Only slight differences between the two games besides Pokémon exclusive to each game
Pokémon Mystery Dungeon: Explorers of Sky	April 18, 2009	October 12, 2009	November 20, 2009
Notes: Released on Nintendo DS; Developed by Chunsoft and published by Nintendo; Originally released in Japan under the title Pokémon Mystery Dungeon: Sky Exploration Team (ポケモン不思議のダンジョン 空の探検隊, Pokémon Fushigi no Danjon Sora no Tankentai); Sister game to Explorers of Time and Explorers of Darkness, expanding on their plot
Pokémon Fushigi no Dungeon: Susume! Honoo no Boukendan, Pokémon Fushigi no Dungeon: Ikuzo! Arashi no Boukendan, and Pokémon Fushigi no Dungeon: Mezase! Hikari no Boukendan	August 4, 2009	none	none
Notes: Three versions of the same game, released on WiiWare; Developed by Chunsoft and published by Nintendo; Titles translate as Pokémon Mystery Dungeon: Keep Going! Blazing Adventure Squad, Pokémon Mystery Dungeon: Let's Go! Stormy Adventure Squad, and Pokémon Mystery Dungeon: Go For It! Light Adventure Squad; Only minor differences between the three games, and saved games can be shared between them
Pokémon Mystery Dungeon: Gates to Infinity	November 23, 2012	March 24, 2013	May 17, 2013
Notes: Released on Nintendo 3DS; Developed by Spike Chunsoft and published by Nintendo; Originally released in Japan under the title Pokémon Mystery Dungeon: Magnagate and the Infinite Labyrinth (ポケモン不思議のダンジョン マグナゲートと∞迷宮隊, Pokémon Fushigi no Dungeon: Magnagate to Mugendai Meikyū)
Pokémon Super Mystery Dungeon	September 17, 2015	November 20, 2015	February 19, 2016
Notes: Released on Nintendo 3DS; Developed by Spike Chunsoft and published by Nintendo

=== Etrian Odyssey series ===
Etrian Odyssey series games
Title	Original release date		
Title	Japan	North America	PAL region
Etrian Mystery Dungeon	March 5, 2015	April 7, 2015	September 11, 2015
Notes: Released on Nintendo 3DS; Developed by Spike Chunsoft and published by Atlus; Part of the Etrian Odyssey video game series
Sekaiju to Fushigi no Dungeon 2	August 31, 2017	none	none
Notes: Released on Nintendo 3DS; Developed by Spike Chunsoft and published by Atlus; Title translates as Etrian Mystery Dungeon 2; Part of the Etrian Odyssey video game series

=== Individual releases ===
Other games
Title	Original release date		
Title	Japan	North America	PAL region
The Nightmare of Druaga: Fushigi no Dungeon	July 29, 2004	October 27, 2004	none
Notes: Released on PlayStation 2; Developed by Arika and published by Namco; Part of the Babylonian Castle Saga series
Kidō Senshi Gundam: Fushigi no Dungeon	April 19, 2004	none	none
Notes: Released on i-mode mobile phones; Developed by Chunsoft and published by SoftBank Creative; Part of the Gundam video game series
TwinBee Dungeon	May 13, 2004	none	none
Notes: Released on mobile phones; Developed and published by Konami; Part of the TwinBee video game series
Mystery Chronicle: One Way Heroics	July 30, 2015	September 13, 2016	September 13, 2016 (PC)
Notes: Released on PlayStation 4 and PlayStation Vita; Developed by Spike Chunsoft; Title translates as Mystery Chronicle: I Won't Look Back Until I Win; Combination of a Mystery Dungeon roguelike with a side-scrolling video game; Based on the video game One Way Heroics
