= Shin-ichiro Tomie =

Japanese video game screenwriter

- 冨江 慎一郎
- Born: 1961 (age 64–65); Chiba, Japan
- Occupations: Game designer; writer
- Years active: 1985–present
- Employer: Spike Chunsoft
- Known for: Mystery Dungeon series

Shin-ichiro Tomie (冨江 慎一郎, Tomie Shinichirō; born 1961) is a Japanese game director, writer and part of Spike Chunsoft's affiliation. Since 1995, he contributes to the company with the Mystery Dungeon franchise as the main writer for the Shiren the Wanderer, and Pokémon Mystery Dungeon series. Prior to his affiliation to the company in 1992, he has also contributed in Tecmo's Tecmo Bowl series of sport games.

== Career ==
Tomie enjoyed association football since his youth, with the Captain Tsubasa series was his initial source of inspiration.

=== Tecmo ===
Tomie joined Tecmo after graduating from university. During that period, he created football-centric games like Tecmo Bowl in 1987 and Captain Tsubasa II in 1990. During the development of Tecmo Super Bowl, released in 1991, despite limited NFL coverage in Japan during the late 1980s, he and programmer Akihiko Shimoji recorded games from NHK satellite broadcasts to accurately recreate them within the game. Tomie's passion on sports also helped the team to work on Tecmo Super Bowl.

=== Chunsoft ===
Later in 1992, Tomie transferred to Chunsoft and consistently worked on the scenario of the Shiren the Wanderer series since its first title in 1995. The reason for his transfer to Chunsoft as a writer was their Sound Novel series such as Otogiriso which he considered innovative, as well as their lack of writers at the company. His hobby for sport games is particularly noticeable in Shiren the Wanderer 2: Shiren's Castle and the Oni Invasion and Shiren Monsters: Netsal, where he oversaw both games as the director.

The scenarios present throughout the Mystery Dungeon series were written so they would not interfere too much into the franchise's roguelike genre. The scenario for the Shiren the Wanderer series is smaller but also intriguing for each title as they are mixed with its difficulty. Initially, he has suggested to put the setting of the series in feudal Japan, compared to the earlier Mystery Dungeon title, Torneko's Great Adventure: Mystery Dungeon. In the Pokémon Mystery Dungeon series, the scenario has more presence in the gameplay than the former series and its appeal comes from "their directions and sounds" rather than the scenario alone. Furthermore, the series does not have a linear timeline between the mainline Pokémon franchise and this series so newcomers would be introduced easily into the series and the genre. In an interview held in 2022, Tomie claimed he was not aware of the western fanbase but was able to receive messages from Japanese fans of the series via letters, with some of them claiming Pokémon Mystery Dungeon: Explorers of Time and Explorers of Darkness, and its sister game Pokémon Mystery Dungeon: Explorers of Sky, his "magnum opus".

In 2012, during the first Nico Nico Game Master event, him and Kaoru Hasegawa appeared in the finale of a real-time attack of the first Shiren the Wanderer game. Even if both series have not received a brand new title since 2010 and 2015 respectively, Tomie left a secret message in the 2020 port of Shiren the Wanderer: The Tower of Fortune and the Dice of Fate, indicating he would still be able to work on the next games if there are enough voices from the fans to green-lit a new Mystery Dungeon game in the company. It eventually happened later with its Nintendo Switch version being better received than anticipated, leading to the completion of Shiren the Wanderer: The Mystery Dungeon of Serpentcoil Island with Tomie being the lead scenarist of that game.

== Works ==
| Year | Title | Role | Ref. |
|---|---|---|---|
| 1985 | Gridiron Fight | Designer | |
| 1985 | Tehkan World Cup | Planner, best players | |
| 1987 | Tecmo Bowl | Producer | |
| 1990 | Captain Tsubasa Vol. II: Super Striker | Planner | |
| 1990 | Tecmo World Cup Soccer | Advisor | |
| 1991 | Tecmo Super Bowl | Director | |
| 1995 | Mystery Dungeon: Shiren the Wanderer | Planner, scenario | |
| 1995 | BS Shiren the Wanderer: Save Surala | Planner, scenario | |
| 1996 | Shiren the Wanderer GB: Monster of Moonlight Village | Planner, scenario | |
| 2000 | Shiren the Wanderer 2: Shiren's Castle and the Oni Invasion | Director, scenario, storyboard | |
| 2001 | Shiren the Wanderer GB2: Magic Castle of the Desert | Scenario | |
| 2002 | Shiren the Wanderer Gaiden: Asuka the Swordswoman | Supervisor | |
| 2004 | Shiren Monsters: Netsal | Director, scenario | |
| 2005 | Pokémon Mystery Dungeon: Red and Blue Rescue Team | Scenario | |
| 2007 | Pokémon Mystery Dungeon: Explorers of Time and Darkness | Scenario | |
| 2008 | Shiren the Wanderer | Supervisor | |
| 2009 | Pokémon Mystery Dungeon: Explorers of Sky | Scenario | |
| 2009 | Pokémon Mystery Dungeon: Adventure Squad | Scenario | |
| 2010 | Shiren the Wanderer 4: The Eye of God and the Devil's Navel | Supervisor | |
| 2010 | Shiren the Wanderer: The Tower of Fortune and the Dice of Fate | Supervisor | |
| 2012 | Pokémon Mystery Dungeon: Gates to Infinity | Scenario | |
| 2015 | Pokémon Super Mystery Dungeon | Scenario | |
| 2017 | Etrian Mystery Dungeon 2 | Game designer, scenario | |
| 2020 | Pokémon Mystery Dungeon: Rescue Team DX | Director, scenario | |
| 2024 | Shiren the Wanderer: The Mystery Dungeon of Serpentcoil Island | Scenario | |
