= Shiren the Wanderer: The Mystery Dungeon of Serpentcoil Island =

2024 roguelike video game

- Developer: Spike Chunsoft
- Publishers: WW: Spike Chunsoft; EU: Reef Entertainment
- Directors: Keisuke Sakurai; Shingo Anzai
- Producers: Emiko Tanaka; Shohei Sakakibara; Ryo Nishimura
- Designer: Seiichiro Nagahata
- Programmer: Shingo Anzai
- Artists: Keisuke Sakurai; Kaoru Hasegawa
- Writer: Shin-ichiro Tomie
- Composer: Keisuke Ito
- Series: Shiren the Wanderer; Mystery Dungeon
- Engine: Unity
- Platforms: Nintendo Switch; Microsoft Windows; iOS; Android
- Release: Nintendo Switch: JP: January 25, 2024; NA: February 27, 2024; EU: February 27, 2024; Microsoft Windows: WW: December 11, 2024; iOS, Android: WW: February 4, 2026
- Genres: Roguelike, role-playing
- Modes: Single-player, multiplayer

Shiren the Wanderer: The Mystery Dungeon of Serpentcoil Island (Note: Known in Japan as Fushigi no Dungeon: Fūrai no Shiren 6: Toguro-jima Tanken Roku (Japanese: 不思議のダンジョン 風来(ふうらい)のシレン6 とぐろ島探検録(じまたんけんろく), Hepburn: Fushigi no Danjon Fūrai no Shiren Shikkusu Toguro tō Tankenroku; lit. Mystery Dungeon: Shiren the Wanderer 6 – Coil Island Exploration Record)) is a roguelike role-playing video game developed and published by Spike Chunsoft. It is the sixth main entry in the Shiren the Wanderer series, which is a subset of the larger Mystery Dungeon series. It was released on Nintendo Switch in 2024, over 13 years after the last mainline title in Japan, Shiren the Wanderer: The Tower of Fortune and the Dice of Fate, and 8 years in the west. A version for Microsoft Windows was released in the same year, while a smartphone port was released in 2026 as part of the Shiren the Wanderer series' thirtieth anniversary.

== Gameplay ==
The gameplay for The Mystery Dungeon of Serpentcoil Island remains the same as other Shiren the Wanderer games; it is a roguelike role-playing video game in which the player traverses randomized dungeons and fights monsters. The game takes gameplay content from the earlier games of the series rather than the latest. As such, little to no content that were featured in Shiren the Wanderer 4: The Eye of God and the Devil's Navel and Shiren the Wanderer: The Tower of Fortune and the Dice of Fate were recycled, like the Day and Night system in dungeons. The i-Dash from Shiren the Wanderer 2: Shiren's Castle and the Oni Invasion also returns in this game, albeit tweaked a little and with a new title. Benemoth, which are giant versions of a common monster, will occasionally appear in dungeons thanks to the Benemoth Gates, and they come with advantages and inconvenient against the player, most notably being invincible to the player's attacks due to their barrier. In addition to returning monsters from the series, such as the iconic Mamel, new monsters were added to the game.

The UI got an overhaul compared to previous entries, now showing the inventory's capacity, and two semi-transparent dialogue boxes reserved for the Adventure Log in the bottom right corner, and the Notebook in the bottom left. The Notebook logs new findings in a dungeon, such as discovering a new monster or item. Returning from the 2020 release of The Tower of Fortune and the Dice of Fate, the Live Display UI has now two types for players livestreaming the game; a compact type focusing on the gameplay, and a detailed type. A third type was later added in an update, being a mix of the two options.

The game features multiplayer content, outside of rescuing defeated players in dungeons. Players are also able to train against species of monsters with the Monster Dojo, or go to alternative routes during the mainline story, which are harder but more rewarding than regular routes.

== Plot ==
The story is set between the events of Shiren the Wanderer GB: Monster of Moonlight Village and Shiren the Wanderer 4: The Eye of God and the Devil's Navel. A few months after leaving Tsukikage Village, Shiren and Koppa (referred to as a ferret) begin dreaming of an island. This dream leads to an existing treasure island named Serpentcoil Island, one of the small islands in the Inland sea. The duo decide to venture there shortly after to explore the island, debunk the rumored treasure guarded by a monster atop the island, and rescue the lost girl who caused their dream. Before that, they travel through the mainland, which was suffering from a drought caused by Kokatsu, and assist nearby citizens dealing with the crisis. Suzuna, an innkeeper of Uzumaki-Ya, supports the team throughout their adventure, letting them to rest at the inn or train in the dojo behind it.

As the duo travel through the island, they meet numerous pirates and ninja scattered around the island, with conflicts being created among them. Asuka, a recurrent side character in the series, participates in the adventure to reunite with her allies in the island, although Koppa does not remember meeting her in the past despite the fact they did. Finally, they face off against Jakaku, the rumored monster, and its army of monsters at the top of Mount Jatou. Upon defeating it, they discover that the island is beginning to float, releasing water and a portion of treasures hidden by pirates toward the mainland. Soon after, the distressed girl, later named Tatsumi, explains there is more to learn from this place's origins, before Shiren and Koppa got forcefully ejected from the top of the mountain by a fireball.

== Development ==
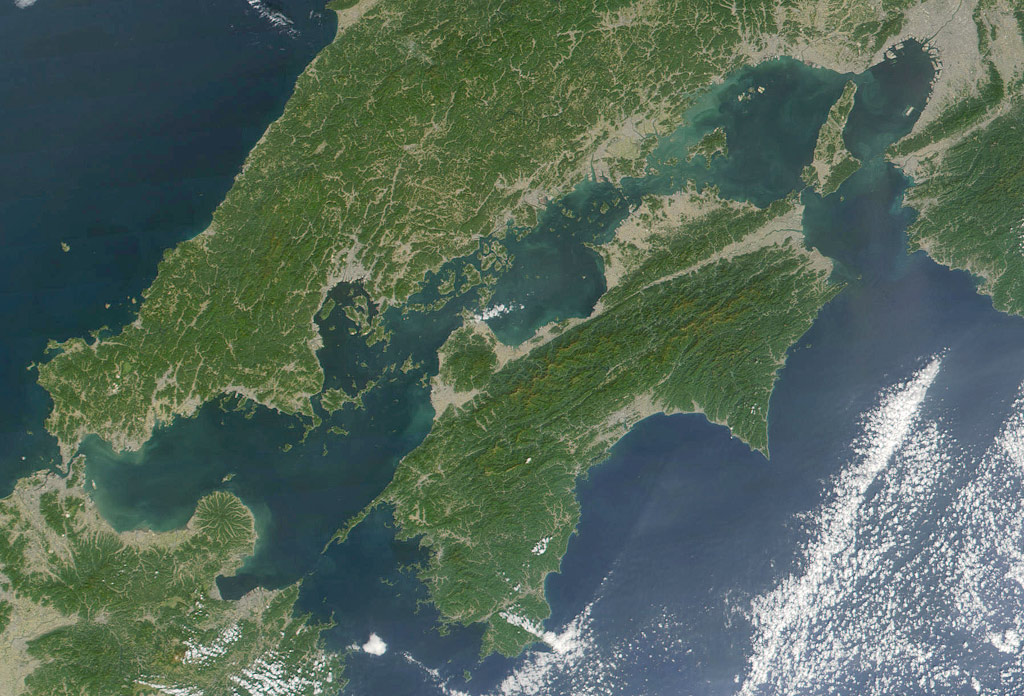
Serpentcoil Island, the game's main location, is based on the Setouchi region.

Prior to the development of The Mystery Dungeon of Serpentcoil Island, the Shiren the Wanderer series was dormant for over a decade, as the newest game, excluding ports and remasters, was released in 2010 for the Nintendo DS. Initially, the game started as a proposal from the team behind the Mystery Dungeon series as they were passionate about creating a brand new game for the series. This proposal was made before the Nintendo Switch and Steam ports of The Tower of Fortune and the Dice of Fate in 2020. From an interview in 2018, Spike Chunsoft's president Mitsutoshi Sakurai answered for potential ports of the series in the future, although it would be a challenge as employees of the company said it will not do well. In 2020, one of the series scenarists, Shin-ichiro Tomie, had left a secret message in the aforementioned ports, indicating he would still able to work on the next Shiren the Wanderer game if there are enough voices from the fans to green-lit a new Shiren the Wanderer game within the company. Eventually, the Switch port of The Tower of Fortune and the Dice of Fate exceeded the company's expectation in terms of reputation and sales, which led to green-lit the development of the new Shiren the Wanderer game soon after. Its development begun in 2021, shortly after the aforementioned event.

The game was initially based on Shiren's Castle and the Oni Invasion, with most of its gameplay sourced from that game along with keeping a "back to basics" mindset, but was later replaced by brand new game mechanics. Key members of the team contributed to the game, such as Seiichiro Nagahata for game balancing and Hideyuki Shinozaki for deciding to put the final boss at the beginning of a new save. Shinozaki was later both surprised and afraid that this decision would not make the game lasts longer than anticipated after finding out players finished it only a few minutes after its release. Tomie added the possibility to play as Shiren Kokatsu, a fusion between the protagonist and Kokatsu in his battle form. Story wise, the team decided to set the game after Monster of Moonlight Village due to the return of Asuka, a side character that appeared throughout the series. They wanted to bring her back into the series with a different behavior to her appearance in the 2008 Wii game, Shiren the Wanderer, and therefore had to set the story before the latter. Serpentcoil Island was inspired by the Setouchi region.

The game was revealed and shown during 2023 at the two game expos, Nintendo Direct presentation and Tokyo Game Show. The game includes new transformations for Shiren with penalties, over thirty dungeons present in the island, and mechanics inherited from other Mystery Dungeon games such as the player's paths marked in the minimap from the Chocobo's Mysterious Dungeon series, 3x3 grid size monsters in dungeons and shortcuts for items functioning like moves in the Pokémon Mystery Dungeon series. Most of the team who worked on the Super Famicom and Nintendo DS versions of Mystery Dungeon: Shiren the Wanderer have returned for this game, such as Kaoru Hasegawa as character designer. In an interview with Keisuke Sakurai and Hideyuki Shinozaki, the game's director and project manager respectively, they explained that they were conscious about the release gap between the two games. Therefore, they decided to add numerous tutorials and removed gameplay content from the last game that was deemed hard for newcomers to the series. From the over 60 species of monsters added to the game, 20% of them are brand new monsters to the series. The game was released in January 2024 in Japan, and in February in other markets.

Noisycroak contributed to the game's soundtrack and sound effects, including Keisuke Ito, who has composed music for the Pokémon Mystery Dungeon series since Pokémon Mystery Dungeon: Explorers of Time and Explorers of Darkness. Ito was inspired by the Shiren the Wanderer series' past composers, being late Koichi Sugiyama, and Hayato Matsuo, while also saying that his contributions are "a link between the past and the future".

=== Plus Pack DLC and Steam release ===
Due to its success, the company had confirmed the development of additional content, which would go on throughout 2024. Official Parallel Data were the first form of downloadable content distributed by the company; the new Parallel Data system was introduced in that game and does not require an update in order to download them. Other updates include new challenges located at the Sacred Tree, new achievements, and new unlockable content.

A paid downloadable content, Plus Pack bundle, was released in Autumn of 2024. In it, Koppa and Asuka appear as playable characters for the Sacred Tree and new additional dungeons, whether available for free or locked in the DLC, are unlocked throughout the story at the Isle of Mysteries. Further updates included free additional content such as more quality of life updates.

A Steam version was released worldwide in December 2024. It includes a digital soundtrack composed by Keisuke Ito, the original composer, and Yasufumi Fukuda, who has previously contributed in other video games such as Super Smash Bros. Brawl.

=== Smartphone release ===
In 2025, Sakurai and Shinozaki have talked about preparing something for the Shiren the Wanderer series' thirtieth anniversary. Later in November, Spike Chunsoft announced a smartphone port of the game, which was released on February 4, 2026.

== Release ==
The Mystery Dungeon of Serpentcoil Island was developed by Spike Chunsoft. The company published the game in Japan and Taiwan on January 25, 2024, and in the United States on February 27. The European release was published by Reef Entertainment in the same day as the United States. Downloadable content for the game were developed throughout 2024, with paid downloadable content released later in Autumn of the same year. A Steam version was published on December 11, 2024.

== Reception ==
Reception

Aggregate scores
Aggregator	Score
Metacritic	83/100 (NS); 86/100 (PC)
OpenCritic	83%

Review scores
Publication	Score
Edge	9/10
Famitsu	38/40
Nintendo Life	8/10 stars
Nintendo World Report	8.5/10
PC Gamer (US)	89/100
RPGamer	4/5
RPGFan	98 (NS); 80 (PC)
TouchArcade	4.5/5

The Mystery Dungeon of Serpentcoil Island received generally favorable reviews by critics according to review aggregator website Metacritic. 83% of critics recommended the game, according to OpenCritic. Early reception for the game were positive, with Famitsu giving a score of 38 out of 40. Reviewers praised for the revival of the series along with its new content; from updated gameplay like the Adventure Log and the return of online content to the balanced difficulty that new players would not give up early on, as it was known to be harder in the past. They have also criticized the game for feeling clunky and repetitive sometimes, as there are not much action happening on screen compared to more modern roguelike games such as Hades, The Binding of Isaac, and Crypt of the NecroDancer, the latter which did crossover with the Shiren the Wanderer series previously. It won an award for the "Nintendo Game of the Year" category in 2024 EDGE Awards and the "Famitsu/Dengeki Special Award" category in Famitsu Game Awards 2024.

The Mystery Dungeon of Serpentcoil Island set records in the Shiren the Wanderer series upon its release. The game has sold over 300,000 copies in total as of 2025. It has sold over 200,000 copies in Japan in its first month, making it the fastest record sales in the series history. 85,424 copies were sold during its first week of release in Japan, making it the third highest retail launch of the Shiren the Wanderer series, behind the Super Famicom release of Mystery Dungeon: Shiren the Wanderer and Shiren's Castle and the Oni Invasion, and the second most copies sold during that week, below the PlayStation 5 release of Like a Dragon: Infinite Wealth. Soon after, the game reached first place in the Japanese Nintendo eShop, above Suika Game.

With its success in Japan, throughout the next month, numerous fans of the Mystery Dungeon series have asked Spike Chunsoft to work on a new Pokémon Mystery Dungeon or Torneko's Great Adventure game, to which the company replied by asking the concerned companies in order to green lit the projects. In 2026, Square Enix released a remake of the first Mystery Dungeon game, Dragon Quest Heroes: Torneko's Mystery Dungeon -Classic HD-, which is not a new game, but can be traced to the demands from the fans as mentioned earlier. By March, the game had higher than expected results, akin to how The Tower of Fortune and the Dice of Fate for Nintendo Switch was before, of which later that month, they confirmed working on additional content for it. The team also thought on working on a seventh numbered game after finishing development, although they will find it hard to change the game's aspect while not repeating the same type of content as the previous ones.
