= Pokémon Mystery Dungeon: Explorers of Sky =

2009 video game

- North American cover art with Pokémon Mystery Dungeon: Explorers of Sky
- Developer: Chunsoft
- Publishers: JP: The Pokémon Company; WW: Nintendo
- Directors: Seiichiro Nagahata; Hironori Ishigami
- Producers: Koichi Nakamura; Hiroaki Tsuru; Mikiko Ohashi; Kunimi Kawamura; Hitoshi Yamagami
- Designers: Hiroshi Nakamura; Fujimi O-nishi; Shinya Yada
- Programmer: Yuji Fukuda
- Artist: Fuyuhiko Koizumi
- Writers: Shin-ichiro Tomie; Emiko Tanaka
- Composers: Arata Iiyoshi; Hideki Sakamoto; Keisuke Ito; Ken-ichi Saito; Yoshihiro Maeda
- Series: Pokémon Mystery Dungeon
- Platform: Nintendo DS
- Release: JP: April 18, 2009; NA: October 12, 2009; AU: November 12, 2009; EU: November 20, 2009
- Genres: Roguelike, role-playing game
- Mode: Single-player

Pokémon Mystery Dungeon: Explorers of Sky (Note: Known in Japan as Pokémon Fushigi no Dungeon: Sky Exploration Team (Japanese: ポケモン不思議のダンジョン 空の探検隊, Hepburn: Pokémon Fushigi no Danjon Sora no Tankentai; lit. Pokémon Mystery Dungeon: Sky Exploration Team)) is an enhanced version of Pokémon Mystery Dungeon: Explorers of Time and Explorers of Darkness released for the Nintendo DS in 2009, developed by Chunsoft and published by The Pokémon Company and Nintendo. Referred to as the definitive edition to the aforementioned games, additional features include the addition of the missing Generation IV Pokémon, further character development for a few side characters in content known as Special Episodes, and a few quality of life improvements for options, items, and other gameplay and system-related features.

In terms of gameplay and premise, Explorers of Sky is largely similar to its predecessors, where a human-turned-Pokémon joins an exploration team, explores shifting dungeons, and fights hostile Pokémon through turn-based combat. The three games had accumulated worldwide sales in excess of 5.9 million copies in 2010, then 6.37 million copies after 2010.

Upon its release, the game received mixed reviews from critics, who criticized the game for the same reasons of its predecessors and were displeased by the lack of updates to the graphics, while the fans' reception was notably more positive, with particular praise for its soundtrack and story. Many consider it a cult classic, and it has since been regarded among the greatest Pokémon games ever made.

== Gameplay ==
Serving as a sister game to Explorers of Time and Explorers of Darkness, new content was added in Explorers of Sky. As with its predecessors, the game follows the story of a human who is mysteriously transformed into a Pokémon, determined by a personality test at the game's start-up. Along with the starters from the previous game, five more are included as playable choices; Phanpy, Riolu, Shinx, Eevee, and Vulpix. Some, however, are only available to certain genders; Eevee, Skitty, and Vulpix are always female, while Riolu, Phanpy, and Shinx are always male. Moreover, 2 starters, Munchlax and Meowth, were removed from the playable roster and can only be picked as the partner.

=== New features ===
Lookalike items will start to appear early in the game; they have different effects from their original counterparts, and are distinguished by having a letter swapped or changed in its name (for example, while an Oran Berry heals 100 HP to its eater, an Oren Berry deals 10 damage). A new location appears in the only town during the story's progression named Spinda Café. It serves as a location to make drinks, recycle items, find new optional dungeons, obtain rare items and new missions, and see team members and recurring Pokémon hanging around. After completing the game's main story, the remaining Generation IV Pokémon that were not present in Explorers of Time and Explorers of Darkness, for example, both forms of Shaymin, the Origin form of Giratina available only for a few dungeons, and Arceus in the form of a statue in Destiny Tower, have returned since their in-game debut in Pokémon Platinum, which was released the year after the original games.

Throughout the entire game, the player is able to unlock music tracks in the Sky Jukebox, which allows them to play the game's entire soundtrack. This feature was recycled in the Nintendo Switch and Steam port of Shiren the Wanderer: The Tower of Fortune and the Dice of Fate in 2020, then for its smartphones port in 2022.

Explorers of Sky expands on the plot of Explorers of Time and Explorers of Darkness. One such is the event Pokémon Shaymin, located in a new location called Shaymin Village, and a new side story for Shaymin available after finishing the main story and graduating from the Guild. One of the new locations, Shaymin Village, along with its dungeon, Sky Peak Mountain Path, references Mystery Dungeon: Shiren the Wanderer and its main dungeon Table Mountain, as the progress from a village to the top of the mountain, checkpoints spread throughout the main dungeon, and a boss at the mountain's peak function equally in both games.

Through completing the main storyline of Explorers of Sky, five new Special Episodes will be gradually unlocked at certain points of the game which add unique stories expanding on side characters of the game, and explores the background of several other characters, sometimes new to the plot. They involve playing as the specified characters of the episode as opposed to the player's protagonist and partner; namely Bidoof, Wigglytuff (as Igglybuff), Sunflora, Team Charm (as Lopunny), and Grovyle.

=== Version exclusives ===
Many new locations are available in both the main story and its special episodes, along with new items, lookalike items, and Pokémon which were previously exclusive to Explorers of Time or Explorers of Darkness. With Explorers of Sky having noticeable differences with the original games, content such as Wonder Mail, now named Wonder Mail S, were not cross compatible. Other minor version exclusives include new background artworks for the game's main menu, faster saving time, and more ways to obtain exclusive rescue quests.

== Plot ==
The plot of the main story is similar to that of Explorers of Time and Darkness. As such, what follows is a plot summary of the five Special Episodes, plus a new part of the postgame.

Long ago, prior to the main story, Igglybuff, later known as the head of the guild Wigglytuff, became an explorer by meeting Armaldo, and began his journey as one. From that moment, he shows his prodigious talent for exploration by succeeding in one difficult expedition after another. However, Armaldo gets arrested for being a criminal in hiding, leaving only a Defend Globe as a memento. Igglybuff, now evolved as Wigglytuff, meets Team Charm in one of his explorations. The treasure hunter team, formed by Lopunny, Gardevoir, and Medicham, have previously heard of a treasure in the south of the continent. After confronting numerous foes, they find the rumored treasure, which turns out be a dud made by Ditto. The real treasure was none other than a Time Gear that was previously seen in the background of Explorers of Time’s title screen.

Long after these events, Bidoof, one of the members of the Wigglytuff Guild, originally wanted to become a first-class explorer. As such, he left his hometown and started training at the guild, with unfavorable results. In an exploration of a rumored treasure, he meets Jirachi, who grants him the wish of having someone to tutor. That ends up being the protagonist and their partner. During the chase against Grovyle in the main story, Sunflora, a senior member of the guild, gets a request on arresting a group of Haunter.

As Grovyle sacrifices himself to drag Dusknoir back to the future in the main story, they and Celebi are forced to wander through the land, as Primal Dialga's defeat in the present grows closer and it gets increasingly agitated. Dusknoir betrays Grovyle, but has a change of heart, which apparently was in motion for quite some time, as stated by Grovyle himself, and stops at the last second the process for which he was about to take Grovyle's body. He is reprimanded by Primal Dialga, who beats him and his Sableye before running off to the Passage of Time. At the end, they chase and fend off Primal Dialga's attack on the passage, while the protagonists beat it in the present, and have their disappearances undone by the power of a being which Dialga states is higher than himself. The trio chooses to enjoy their time in the revitalized world.

After the team graduates from the Wigglytuff Guild, Spinda's Café discovers a village inhabited by Shaymin at the east of the continent. By the time the protagonists get there, numerous explorers are already traversing the nearby Sky Mountain. Its peak, once a lush environment from where the continent could be viewed, had been taken over by a band of Grimer and Muk. The protagonists drive them out, and a Shaymin purifies the area, returning its old luster and using the peak's Gracidea flowers to change into its Sky Forme.

== Development ==
With the success of Explorers of Time and Explorers of Darkness worldwide, and the Pokémon Mystery Dungeon series selling over 10 million copies sold by the end of 2008, Explorers of Sky was announced half a year after the release of Shiren the Wanderer 3 for the Wii in Japan.

On January 20, 2009, few video game related news teased Explorers of Sky with a pending release date set for Spring 2009. Like Pokémon Platinum was the sister game of Pokémon Diamond and Pearl at the time, Explorers of Sky was shown as the sister game of Explorers of Time and Explorers of Darkness, and featured additional content such as additional Pokémon available at the start and side stories centered for a few side characters in "Special Episodes". Nearly a month after its teasing, the game received a release date set for April 18, 2009 in Japan, in addition of a website dedicated to the game. A day before its initial release, more information were revealed for the game, along with the presence of Shaymin and its new location, Shaymin Village.

When the game was first revealed in Japan, western media expected to see an overseas release by the end of 2009. A trimester after its Japanese release, on July 29, 2009, Explorers of Sky received a North American release for October 12 of the same year, confirmed by Nintendo of America. Later in September 2009, a European released was confirmed for November 20, and in October 2009 an Australian release for November 12. This game was the last time Nob Ogasawara was credited as a translator in both the Pokémon and Mystery Dungeon franchises, as he left that position by the time Explorers of Time and Darkness released. Prior to this event, he had worked as a translator to the latter series with Pokémon Mystery Dungeon: Red and Blue Rescue Team and Torneko: The Last Hope.

== Release ==
Explorers of Sky was released in Japan and Taiwan on April 18, 2009; North America on October 12, 2009; Australia on November 12, 2009; and Europe on November 20, 2009. No release for South Korea was announced throughout 2009, even if its predecessors had one. It was later re-released, along with Pokémon Mystery Dungeon: Blue Rescue Team and Red Rescue Team, on the Wii U Virtual Console in Japan on July 20, 2016, in North America on June 23, 2016, and in the PAL region on August 18, 2016.

== Reception ==
Reception

Aggregate scores
Aggregator	Score
GameRankings	55.84%
Metacritic	54/100

Review scores
Publication	Score
1Up.com	C+
Famitsu	35/40
GamePro	5/10
Hardcore Gamer	5/10
IGN	4.9/10
Jeuxvideo.com	13/20
Nintendo Life	7/10
Nintendo Power	8/10
Official Nintendo Magazine	7/10
RPGamer	2/5
RPGFan	83%

In its initial release in 2009, Explorers of Sky received mixed reviews with the game receiving a score of 54 out of 100 on Metacritic. However, more recent reviews rated this game with slightly higher scores than average. In the video game magazine Famitsu, the game obtained the Platinum Hall of Fame, with a total of 35 points out of 40 by the writers.

Fan reception has been notably more positive ever since its initial release, with many considering it a cult classic and one of the best games in the series, praising the game for its gameplay and story-writing. In an interview held in 2022, Shin-ichiro Tomie claimed he was not aware of the western fanbase, but was able to receive messages from Japanese fans of the series via letters, with some of them claiming the trio as his "magnum opus". In 2018, through exchanges with a fan via e-mail, one of the main composers of the series, Arata Iiyoshi, wanted to release an original soundtrack based on his works on the two first Pokémon Mystery Dungeon games but could not due to rights issues.

Some characters from this game later returned in the Nintendo 3DS game, Pokémon Super Mystery Dungeon, as non-playable characters; they appear in the Connection Orb.

1.40 million copies of Explorers of Sky had been sold by March 31, 2010, bringing the total sales of the three games to over 5.90 million copies. Later, combined worldwide sales for the three Explorers games passed over 6.37 million copies according to Computer Entertainment Supplier's Association; 4.88 million for Explorers of Time and Explorers of Darkness and 1.49 million for Explorers of Sky. They are currently the best-selling games in the Pokémon Mystery Dungeon series, surpassing their predecessors. They are also the best-selling games in the Mystery Dungeon series in general; surpassing Squaresoft's Chocobo's Mysterious Dungeon and Enix's Torneko: The Last Hope, both accumulating 1.34 million and 759,000 copies respectively.

== Anime tie-in ==
A sequel episode, Pokémon Mystery Dungeon: Explorers of Sky - Beyond Time & Darkness, (Note: ポケモン不思議のダンジョン 空の探検隊 時と闇をめぐる 最後の冒険; lit. "Pokémon Mystery Dungeon: Explorers of Sky: The Final Adventure Crossing Time and Darkness") was first broadcast in Japan on April 12, 2009, also as part of Pokémon Sunday.
