= Koichi Nakamura =

Japanese video game designer

- 中村 光一
- Born: August 15, 1964 (age 62); Marugame, Kagawa, Japan
- Education: University of Electro-Communications
- Occupations: Game designer; game producer
- Years active: 1982–present
- Employer(s): Chunsoft (1984–2012); Spike Chunsoft (2012–2020)
- Known for: Dragon Quest series Mystery Dungeon series

Koichi Nakamura (中村 光一, Nakamura Kōichi; born August 15, 1964) is a Japanese video game designer. Nakamura gained fame as a programming prodigy while still in high school; in 1982, he entered Enix's first national programming contest and claimed runner-up prize with his entry, Door Door. In 1984, he founded Chunsoft and served as the company's president. After Chunsoft merged with Spike in 2012, Nakamura served as chairman of Spike Chunsoft until he left the company in 2020.

== Biography ==
=== Early life and career ===
Koichi Nakamura was born on August 15, 1964. He was originally from the Kagawa Prefecture, Japan. Nakamura was a member of the math club at Marugame High School in Kagawa. There he wrote a version of the video game Galaxy Wars in the BASIC programming language on a Tandy TRS-80.

In order to play games such as Galaxian that were ported to the NEC PC-8001 by Geimu Kyoujin from I/O magazine, Nakamura bought a PC-8001 using money he'd saved up by delivering newspapers. It was on that PC-8001 that he developed his program submissions. He submitted a machine code input tool to I/O magazine, which was published in the February 1981 issue as his debut publication, earning him ¥20,000 for his work.

During spring break of his first year in high school, Nakamura cloned the arcade video game Space Panic as ALIEN Part II. It was published in the May 1981 issue and released on cassette tape, earning ¥200,000 in royalties. In the January 1982 issue, his clone of Konami's Scramble (later renamed to Attacker) was also released on cassette, earning royalties of ¥1 million. A clone of River Patrol, called River Rescue, was published in the Maikon Game Book 4 special edition of I/O, bringing Nakamura's total high school earnings from submissions to I/O to over ¥2 million. Due to his activities with I/O, he became well known among young PC enthusiasts.

Nakamura entered the first Annual Hobby Program Contest held by Enix during his 3rd year of high school in 1982. Submitting his first original game, Door Door, Nakamura was selected as the runner-up prize winner for programming excellence, and received ¥500,000 in prize money.

=== Career ===
In 1983, Nakamura moved to Tokyo and entered the University of Electro-Communications. He ported Door Door to various computer systems resulting in his annual royalties as a university student exceeding ¥10 million.

Nakamura released his 2nd PC game Newtron and founded the 5-person Chunsoft on April 9, 1984, during spring break of his 2nd year of university. He started to work out of a room in a condominium in Chōfu, Tokyo. The first Chunsoft release was the 1985 PC-6001 version of Door Door mkII. Following that, joining Enix on the Famicom, Chunsoft began development on home video game consoles. While the PC version had sold 80,000 copies, the Famicom version recorded sales of 200,000 copies, leading subsequent development to focus on home consoles. From that, fellow Enix program contest winner Yuji Horii joined Nakamura in collaborating on the Famicom port of The Portopia Serial Murder Case

At the time, Nakamura and Horii were fans of the computer role-playing games Wizardry and Ultima, and so set out to develop a full-blown Famicom RPG called Dragon Quest. Prior to its release, Nakamura also cited Masanobu Endō, creator of action role-playing game The Tower of Druaga, as his favorite game designer. Nakamura continued development on the Dragon Quest series through to Dragon Quest V: Hand of the Heavenly Bride, before breaking away from Enix products.

=== Post-Enix ===
Otogirisō marked Chunsoft's debut brand. Following that, successive genre-trailblazing titles Torneko no Daibōken: Fushigi no Dungeon, Kamaitachi no Yoru, and Shiren the Wanderer established the company's good reputation. Nakamura himself had to move away from programming in order to run the company.

For a time, the company's products were considered mediocre, but 3-Nen B-Gumi Kinpachi Sensei: Densetsu no Kyoudan ni Tate! was a hit that showed signs of recovery.

=== SEGA×CHUN PROJECT ===
From 2005 to 2010, Chunsoft had teamed up with Sega's home video game business, where Sega funded and published eight games with Chunsoft. In one of them, Nakamura served as producer for the Wii game 428: Shibuya Scramble.

== Works ==
Year	Title	Role
1983	Door Door	Game designer, programmer
1984	Newtron	Director, programmer
1985	The Portopia Serial Murder Case (Famicom port)	Director, programmer
1986	Dragon Quest	Director, programmer
1987	Dragon Quest II	Director, chief programmer
1988	Dragon Quest III	Director
1990	Dragon Quest IV	Director
1991	Famicom Jump II: Saikyō no Shichinin	Director
1991	Tetris 2 + Bombliss	Director
1992	Otogirisō	Director, producer
1992	Dragon Quest V	Supervisor
1993	Torneko's Great Adventure: Mystery Dungeon	Producer
1994	Kamaitachi no Yoru	Producer
1995	Mystery Dungeon: Shiren the Wanderer	Producer
1996	Shiren the Wanderer GB: Monster of Moonlight Village	Producer
1997	Chocobo's Mysterious Dungeon	Supervisor
1998	Machi	Producer
1998	Chocobo's Dungeon 2	Supervisor
1999	Torneko: The Last Hope	Executive producer
2000	Shiren the Wanderer 2	Executive producer
2001	Shiren the Wanderer GB2: Magic Castle of the Desert	Executive producer
2002	Shiren the Wanderer Gaiden: Asuka the Swordswoman	Supervisor
2002	Kamaitachi no Yoru 2	Executive producer
2002	Torneko's Great Adventure 3	Executive producer
2004	Shiren Monsters: Netsal	Producer
2004	3-Nen B-Gumi Kinpachi Sensei: Densetsu no Kyoudan ni Tate!	Producer
2005	Homeland	Producer
2005	Pokémon Mystery Dungeon: Red and Blue Rescue Team	Producer
2006	Kamaitachi no Yoru ×3	Producer
2007	Pokémon Mystery Dungeon: Explorers of Time and Darkness	Producer
2007	Imabikisō	Executive producer
2008	Shiren the Wanderer 3	Executive producer
2008	428: Shibuya Scramble	Producer
2009	Pokémon Mystery Dungeon: Explorers of Sky	Producer
2009	Pokémon Mystery Dungeon: Adventure Team	Producer
2009	999: Nine Hours, Nine Persons, Nine Doors	Executive producer
2010	Shiren the Wanderer 4	Executive producer
2010	Trick × Logic	Executive producer
2010	Shiren the Wanderer 5	Executive producer
2011	Zombie Daisuki	Executive producer
2012	Zero Escape: Virtue's Last Reward	Executive producer
2012	Danganronpa 2: Goodbye Despair	Supervisor
2012	Pokémon Mystery Dungeon: Gates to Infinity	Producer
2013	Conception II: Children of the Seven Stars	Executive producer
2013	Attack on Titan: Humanity in Chains	Supervisor
2014	Danganronpa Another Episode: Ultra Despair Girls	Executive producer
2015	Etrian Mystery Dungeon	Executive producer
2015	Mystery Chronicle: One Way Heroics	Executive producer
2015	Pokémon Super Mystery Dungeon	Producer
2015	Grand Kingdom	Producer
2015	Exist Archive: The Other Side of the Sky	Executive producer
2016	Zero Time Dilemma	Supervisor
2017	Danganronpa V3: Killing Harmony	Executive producer
2018	Zanki Zero: Last Beginning	Executive producer
2019	Tech Tech Tech Tech	Producer
