= Shiren the Wanderer =

Original video game series from the Mystery Dungeon franchise

- Logo for the 2008 game
- Genres: Role-playing, roguelike
- Developer: Spike Chunsoft (formerly Chunsoft)
- Publishers: Spike Chunsoft (formerly Spike and Chunsoft); Nintendo; Sega; Atlus USA; Aksys Games
- Creators: Koichi Nakamura; Seiichiro Nagahata
- Artist: Kaoru Hasegawa
- Writers: Shin-ichiro Tomie; Masato Kato
- Composers: Koichi Sugiyama; Hayato Matsuo; Keisuke Ito
- Platforms: Super Famicom; Nintendo 64; Wii; Game Boy; Game Boy Color; Game Boy Advance; Nintendo DS; Nintendo Switch; PlayStation Portable; PlayStation Vita; Dreamcast; mobile devices; Windows
- First release: Mystery Dungeon 2: Shiren the Wanderer; December 1, 1995
- Latest release: Shiren the Wanderer: The Mystery Dungeon of Serpentcoil Island; January 25, 2024
- Parent series: Mystery Dungeon
- Spin-offs: Shiren Monsters

Shiren the Wanderer is a video game series of roguelike and role-playing games developed by Spike Chunsoft (formerly Chunsoft). Unlike licensed crossovers within the Mystery Dungeon franchise, this series features original characters, including the eponymous rōnin protagonist Shiren and his traveling companion and talking weasel Koppa, with a plot and the location set generally in feudal Japan, and though indicative of the core games, which is navigating through a randomly generated dungeon using turn-based moves. As of January 2024, there have been multiple games across Nintendo and Sony platforms, mobile devices, Windows, and Steam, as well as few other medias released throughout the years.

These games are based on procedural generated dungeons ("mystery dungeons"), which are dungeons with unique corridors and rooms for each floors every time the player enters in one. In dungeons, they have to fight monsters while collecting items to survive throughout the adventure, whether to protect against stronger foes, avoid unseen traps and hazards, or avoid starving, with the goal of exiting the dungeon after a fixed number of floors.

== Gameplay ==
Most Mystery Dungeon games center around exploring a dungeon with randomly generated layouts and fights. These are in a turn-based manner, where the player's every action such as attacking or walking is met by the opponents' action. Chunsoft described the gameplay as being like chess. Escape from the dungeon is allowed in certain places or using certain items. In most games from this series, when the player loses the game by fainting, they lose everything and have to start from scratch. Features distinct to the Shiren the Wanderer series include the "Melding Jar" which allows players to synthesize items and weapons into more powerful ones.

A unique gameplay element that first appeared in Shiren the Wanderer GB2: Magic Castle of the Desert and later in the Mystery Dungeon franchise is rescuing other players via passwords. They went with the idea of player sharing passwords instead of using the Game Boy's Game Link Cable in order to help others, as there were not many owners of the cable. This idea was expanded in Shiren the Wanderer Gaiden: Asuka the Swordswoman with the addition of online support. Within the online support, players could receive new dungeons, called either "Weekly Dungeon"; a dungeon that could be played online on a weekly basis, or "Challenge Dungeon"; a more difficult dungeon where useful items appeared rarely. Another gameplay that was introduced in this series was the ability to collect monsters in dungeons via an item in Shiren the Wanderer 2: Shiren's Castle and the Oni Invasion, along with a place to let the player see their collection. It was later reused in the Mystery Dungeon franchise, notably in Dragon Quest: Young Yangus and the Mysterious Dungeon with an item, and the Pokémon Mystery Dungeon as a core gameplay element.

Koichi Nakamura explained that the appeal of the Mystery Dungeon series is that every game is different and that players skills are constantly being challenged, which helps the player feel deeply involved. Seiichiro Nagahata, who supervised and planned the development of the Nintendo DS version of Mystery Dungeon: Shiren the Wanderer, explained that the Mystery Dungeon series is all about "tension" and "reasoning".

== Development ==
Before the series' creation, the Mystery Dungeon franchise had only one game known as Torneko's Great Adventure: Mystery Dungeon in 1993. It was Chunsoft's first try on bringing the roguelike genre to home console after Sega's attempt, of which the latter was met with little success.

=== History ===
The company wanted to work on the new features and gameplay mechanics featured in NetHack, a variant of Rogue, with one of them being able to steal items from a shopkeeper. This, however, was not possible to convert the new content from NetHack with characters from the Dragon Quest series; one case was with Torneko, who is himself a merchant in the series. The scenarios present throughout the series were written so they would not interfere too much into its core genre; its story length is noticeably smaller than the other crossovers, but also intriguing for each title as they are mixed with the genre's difficulty. Two years after the release of Torneko's Great Adventure, Mystery Dungeon 2: Shiren the Wanderer was released as the company's second work for the Mystery Dungeon series, with a new world setting and unique characters.

Although the first game was not as popular as its predecessor, the company kept working on it later on. Many titles from this series were developed simultaneously throughout the years, where one title was focused on creating original features in its gameplay for home console, while the other was remaining basic, respecting the "traditional dungeon types" for which they were forced to due to the limitations of handheld console: Mystery Dungeon 2: Shiren the Wanderer on Super Famicom and Shiren the Wanderer GB: Monster of Moonlight Village on Game Boy, and Shiren the Wanderer 2: Shiren's Castle and the Oni Invasion on Nintendo 64 and Shiren the Wanderer GB2: Magic Castle of the Desert on Game Boy Color. Shiren the Wanderer 4: The Eye of God and the Devil's Navel and Shiren the Wanderer: The Tower of Fortune and the Dice of Fate were also developed simultaneously, albeit both of them were released on Nintendo DS in 2010 and exclusively in Japan. Other contributors outside of the company have participated in the series, such as Akiman for the Nintendo DS release of the first game, who he himself requested to Nakamura to do some artworks for the characters, of which one of his arts was featured in the Japanese's box art.

After the release of The Tower of Fortune and the Dice of Fate in 2010, the series entered a dormant state. Numerous indications of a potential revival of the series appeared before 2023. In 2018, Mitsutoshi Sakurai, Spike Chunsoft's current president, answered for potential ports of the series in the future, although it will be a challenge as employees said it will not be a success. In 2020, Shin-ichiro Tomie has left a secret message in the Nintendo Switch and Steam ports of The Tower of Fortune and the Dice of Fate, indicating he is still able to work on the next games if there are enough voices from the fans to green-lit a new Mystery Dungeon game within the company. This worked as the Switch port of The Tower of Fortune and the Dice of Fate was well received in reception and sales, thus green-lighting the development of the sixth numbered game, Shiren the Wanderer: The Mystery Dungeon of Serpentcoil Island.

=== Music ===
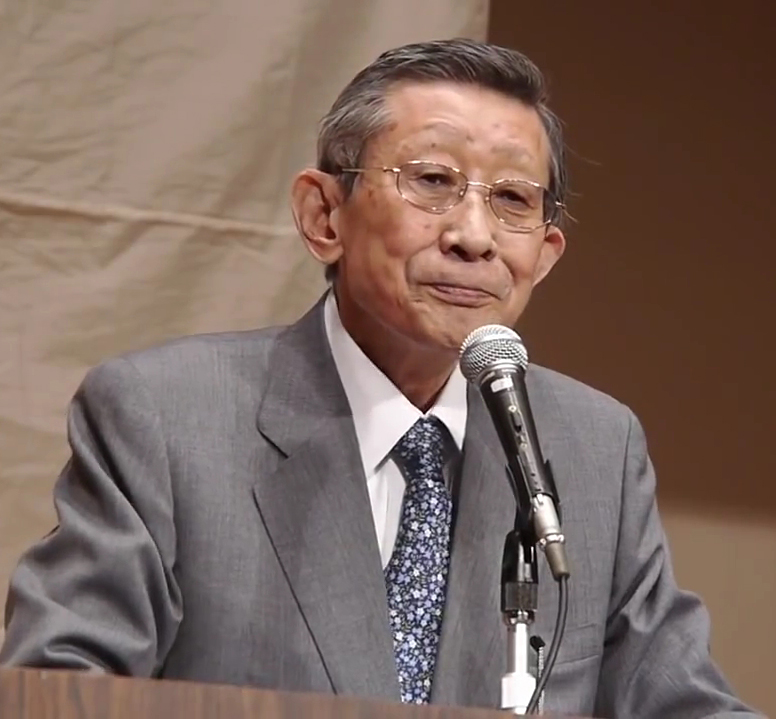
Koichi Sugiyama was one of the composers for the series.

The soundtracks were composed by late Dragon Quest composer Koichi Sugiyama, and Hayato Matsuo for this series. Sugiyama made use of East Asian elements for the series, compared to his more European-styled Dragon Quest compositions, using instruments such as a shakuhachi flute. This theme would remain for the series' next titles. Hayato Matsuo later became the main composer for the series, starting in the Game Boy Color release of Magic Castle of the Desert in 2001. Sugiyama asked Matsuo not to have his music arranged too much; he had to modify them enough to differ his scores with Sugiyama's for the series.

Prior to his death, Sugiyama would occasionally return to contribute only a main theme and some battle themes. After his death in 2021, noisycroak employee Keisuke Ito took the role of main composer for the series. As he previously contributed to the Pokémon Mystery Dungeon series, his compositions were inspired of the previous composers, while adding his own themes as "a link between the past and the future".

=== Design ===
New titles are released with unique gameplay for each one, with Seiichiro Nagahata balancing the core games based on how players and employees would complete a dungeon. Early into the series, some content were sharing similarities with those of the Dragon Quest series, as its predecessor in the Mystery Dungeon franchise was a spin-off of the latter. Hence, data and its user interface were recycled in the first game. Gameplay was balanced with the use of sheets from Microsoft Excel by Nagahata, in order to understand data for items and monsters better in dungeons.

Shin-ichiro Tomie, the series' scenarist and sometimes director until the spin-off game Shiren Monsters: Netsal, has suggested to set the series's story in feudal Japan, compared to the previous Mystery Dungeon title. Character designer Kaoru Hasegawa later took part during the production of Mystery Dungeon 2: Shiren the Wanderer after his first contribution in Chunsoft's Kamaitachi no Yoru (Banshee's Last Cry) as an artist. In an interview with the company, they wanted someone who could work on the then sequel to Torneko's Great Adventure, but he was not familiar with the title, nor the roguelike genre at the time of the interview. After being interested in the genre by playing through the game and being employed in the company, he was able work in the game, with respecting the theme Tomie imposed to the game instead of a western art style, like Akira Toriyama's Dragon Quest characters. Many drafts were made for the silent protagonist of the eponymous game, and its mascot monster the Mamel; most of them were lost. Since then, he has contributed to the series as a character designer, occasionally as an art director like in Shiren's Castle and the Oni Invasion.

From the Wii release of Shiren the Wanderer to The Tower of Fortune and the Dice of Fate, the lead scenarist was replaced by Masato Kato, as Tomie was working on the other branches of the Mystery Dungeon series, most notably in the Pokémon branch, before reprising his role in The Mystery Dungeon of Serpentcoil Island.

== Games ==
Release timeline Mainline series in green Spin-offs in yellow
1995	Mystery Dungeon 2: Shiren the Wanderer
1996	BS Shiren the Wanderer: Save Surala
1996	Shiren the Wanderer GB: Monster of Moonlight Village
1997–1999
2000	Shiren the Wanderer 2: Shiren's Castle and the Oni Invasion
2001	Shiren the Wanderer GB2: Magic Castle of the Desert
2002	Shiren the Wanderer Gaiden: Asuka the Swordswoman
2003
2004	Shiren Monsters: Netsal
2005–2007
2008	Shiren the Wanderer
2009
2010	Shiren the Wanderer 4: The Eye of God and the Devil's Navel
2010	Shiren the Wanderer: The Tower of Fortune and the Dice of Fate
2011–2012
2013	Shiren the Wanderer: Princess Suzune and the Tower of Slumber
2014–2023
2024	Shiren the Wanderer: The Mystery Dungeon of Serpentcoil Island

The games are primarily developed and published by Spike Chunsoft, formerly Chunsoft before the merging in 2012. There are exceptions where a few games were developed or published by other companies, whether in Japan or in the west. Across the series, including spin-offs and excluding remakes and ports throughout the years, there have been 12 games released in total, with The Mystery Dungeon of Serpentcoil Island being the most recent mainline game that was released in 2024. Prior to that game, the series was dormant with The Tower of Fortune and the Dice of Fate, released in 2010, which was the last mainline game for over thirteen years.

As this series remained in Japan for a long time, it was only in 2008 that it got its first release outside of Japan with the Nintendo DS release of Mystery Dungeon: Shiren the Wanderer, published by Sega. There have been fan translations of this series in many languages prior to that year, including English, and is still receiving them lately, such as the fan translation of Shiren's Castle and the Oni Invasion completed exactly 21 years after its initial release.

The series had its first spin-off game in 2004, titled Shiren Monsters: Netsal. It is only one game based on its monsters. Its gameplay was notably changed to the sport genre, specifically towards association football, compared to the mainline's roguelike genre. Another game for the series was released for pachinko machines in 2013, titled Shiren the Wanderer: Princess Suzune and the Tower of Slumber.

== Plot ==
While the series does not have an exact year of when it occurs, there exists a timeline for the eponymous protagonist and his friend Asuka. Canonically, Shiren's Castle and the Oni Invasion is the earliest point of the story, where Shiren began his adventure with Koppa when he was a child, and goes up to The Sleeping Princess and the Karakuri Mansion, where he learns about his ancestors and his family at 21.

== Characters ==
Playable characters in the series
Character	1	Moonlight Village	2	Magic Castle	Gaiden	3	4	5	Tower of Slumber	6
Shiren	✓	✓	✓	✓	✗	✓	✓	✓	✓	✓
Koppa	✗	✗	✗	✗	✗	✗	✗	✗	✗	✓
Asuka	✗	✗	Orange tick	✗	✓	✓	✗	✗	✗	✓
Sensei	✗	✗	✗	✗	✗	✓	✗	✗	✗	✗

- Shiren (VA: Shinichiro Ohta - Save Surala) is the namesake protagonist of the Shiren the Wanderer series. Though still relatively young, he has survived countless adventures. With his trademark bamboo kasa and vertical-striped cape, he is always joined by his ever-reliable partner and travel companion Koppa.
- Koppa (VA: Mami Matsui - Save Surala; Kumiko Watanabe - Tower of Slumber) is a talking weasel that can understand human language. He is from a line of domesticated ferrets with the ability to speak. As years go by, his talking brethren have become increasingly rare. He is a long-time traveling companion of Shiren, and has also traveled with Asuka.
- Asuka (VA: Yoko Hikasa - Tower of Slumber) is a swordswoman and a close friend of Shiren and Koppa. She has her own adventure with Koppa in Asuka the Swordswoman.
- Sensei (VA: Rikiya Koyama - Tower of Slumber) is Shiren's uncle, and the man who taught him the blade. Though he may seem like a lackadaisical ronin who only cares for good drink, he is a master swordsman that can be trusted in dire times.

== Other media ==
The Shiren the Wanderer story has been adapted to other media over time. One such example is Shiren the Wanderer: Flowers Dancing in the Golden Town Amteca, a novella adaptation published in December 2004. It is set in the timeline of the original game, Mystery Dungeon 2: Shiren the Wanderer, with new characters.

== Reception ==
Although it has less popularity than the franchise's other crossovers, notably the Pokémon crossover, Pokémon Mystery Dungeon, of which led to confusion onto the series' origins, there exist a moderate fanbase of the series with a majority located in Japan. Passionate fans of the Shiren the Wanderer series are also commonly called "Shi-Ranger" in Japan.

It has been both praised and criticized for its difficulty, and generally noted for the uneven quality of the randomly generated levels, or "floors", the games produce, which led to generally favorable ratings in Japan and throughout the world. Famitsu awarded a 36/40 to Shiren's Castle and the Oni Invasion and a 38/40 to the original release of Magic Castle of the Desert, the highest score the publication had given to a Game Boy Color game. As of 2026, the series has sold over three million copies, with all versions of Mystery Dungeon: Shiren the Wanderer and The Tower of Fortune and the Dice of Fate leading among other titles.^{[a]}

Crossovers with this series also happened outside of the Mystery Dungeon franchise, with the eponymous protagonist appearing as himself or costumes based on him, likewise for Asuka, or monsters make their presence in games that were published by Spike Chunsoft, like Terraria and Crypt of the NecroDancer, or in their own IPs such as 428: Shibuya Scramble, and the Danganronpa and AI: The Somnium Files series.

== Notes ==
^^{[a]} 0.52 million copies sold from the Mystery Dungeon: Shiren the Wanderer titles, 0.1 million copies sold from the Shiren the Wanderer: Monster of Moonlight Village titles, 0.28 million copies sold from Shiren the Wanderer 2: Shiren's Castle and the Oni Invasion, 0.28 million copies sold from the Shiren the Wanderer: Magic Castle of the Desert titles, 0.05 million copies sold from the Shiren the Wanderer Gaiden: Asuka the Swordswoman titles, 0.03 million copies sold from Shiren Monsters: Netsal, 0.14 million copies sold from the Shiren the Wanderer 3: The Sleeping Princess and the Karakuri Mansion titles, 0.11 million copies sold from the Shiren the Wanderer 4: The Eye of God and the Devil's Navel titles, 0.5 million copies sold from the Shiren the Wanderer: The Tower of Fortune and the Dice of Fate titles, 0.3 million copies sold from Shiren the Wanderer: The Mystery Dungeon of Serpentcoil Island.
