= Pokémon Mystery Dungeon: Explorers of Time and Explorers of Darkness =

2007 video game

Pokémon Mystery Dungeon: Explorers of Time Pokémon Mystery Dungeon: Explorers of Darkness
- Box art for Explorers of Time (left) and Explorers of Darkness (right)
- Developer: Chunsoft
- Publishers: JP: The Pokémon Company; WW: Nintendo
- Directors: Seiichiro Nagahata; Hironori Ishigami
- Producers: Koichi Nakamura; Hiroaki Tsuru; Hiroyuki Jinnai; Kunimi Kawamura; Hitoshi Yamagami
- Designers: Hiroshi Nakamura; Fujimi O-nishi; Shinya Yada
- Programmer: Yuji Fukuda
- Artist: Fuyuhiko Koizumi
- Writers: Shin-ichiro Tomie; Emiko Tanaka
- Composers: Arata Iiyoshi; Hideki Sakamoto; Keisuke Ito; Ryoma Nakamura; Kenichi Saito
- Series: Pokémon Mystery Dungeon
- Platform: Nintendo DS
- Release: JP: September 13, 2007; NA: April 20, 2008; AU: June 19, 2008; EU: July 4, 2008
- Genres: Roguelike; role-playing
- Mode: Single player

Pokémon Mystery Dungeon: Explorers of Time (Note: Known in Japan as Pokémon Fushigi no Dungeon: Time Exploration Team (Japanese: ポケモン不思議のダンジョン 時の探検隊, Hepburn: Pokémon Fushigi no Danjon Toki no Tankentai; lit. Pokémon Mystery Dungeon: Time Exploration Team)) and Pokémon Mystery Dungeon: Explorers of Darkness (Note: Known in Japan as Pokémon Fushigi no Dungeon: Darkness Exploration Team (Japanese: ポケモン不思議のダンジョン 闇の探検隊, Hepburn: Pokémon Fushigi no Danjon Yami no Tankentai; lit. Pokémon Mystery Dungeon: Darkness Exploration Team)) are a matched pair of Pokémon games developed by Chunsoft and published by The Pokémon Company and Nintendo for the Nintendo DS. The two games were released in Japan in September 2007, and in North America and Europe in 2008. A third version, Pokémon Mystery Dungeon: Explorers of Sky, was released for the same hardware in 2009.

As a sequel to Pokémon Mystery Dungeon: Blue Rescue Team and Red Rescue Team, new features include the addition of Generation IV Pokémon, improved Wi-Fi functionality, and more touch-screen options. The games feature 491 of the 493 Pokémon, as Shaymin and Arceus were not officially revealed at the time of the game's launch.

In terms of gameplay and premise, the Explorers installments are largely similar to their Rescue Team predecessors, where a human-turned-Pokémon joins an Exploration Society and explores shifting dungeons, fighting hostile Pokémon through turn-based combat. The games received mixed reviews from critics, receiving praise for their storyline, soundtrack, and Wi-Fi functionality, but were criticized for its graphics and repetitive gameplay. The three games had accumulated worldwide sales in excess of 5.9 million copies as of 2010, then 6.37 million copies after 2010.

== Gameplay ==
=== Playable Pokémon ===
As with the previous games, the player takes on the role of a human who has been turned into a Pokémon, whose type is determined by a personality test. A partner Pokémon is also selected who will henceforth be referred to as "the partner". Unlike Blue Rescue Team and Red Rescue Team, the gender does not restrict the available selection of Pokémon for either the player or the partner, though both player and partner may not be of the same type. The test sets the player as one of the many natures in the mainstream games, and two Pokémon will be set to that nature, one for male, one for female.

The player may be Bulbasaur, Charmander, Squirtle, Pikachu, Meowth, Chikorita, Cyndaquil, Totodile, Treecko, Torchic, Mudkip, Skitty, Turtwig, Chimchar, Piplup and Munchlax; a total of 16 Pokémon to choose from. Once chosen, the partner may be any of the above Pokémon, with the exception of Pokémon of the same type of the player, Meowth, Skitty and Munchlax. Eevee, Machop, Cubone and Psyduck were removed as starter Pokémon, though Eevee was again made available in Explorers of Sky. Riolu was debated for a player Pokémon in Explorers of Time and Darkness, but the idea was eventually dropped, and Riolu was selected for the Explorers of Sky list.

=== Basic gameplay ===
The basic gameplay is unchanged from Blue Rescue Team and Red Rescue Team - players may use shops in Treasure Town to save money, buy items, store items, and train in special "maze" levels (although the Pokémon running almost all of these shops have changed). Players enter dungeons to complete missions and encounter hostile Pokémon during the exploration. During the story portion, if either the player or their partner is defeated by running out of health, the team will be removed from the dungeon and lose all their money and half (or more) of their items. However, after beating the main story, the team will only be removed if the team leader faints.

=== New features ===
New to this series is the option to temporarily send a team member to aid a friend who is in need, which allows a team to have more than four members. Defeated teams awaiting rescue may also engage in a "standby adventure" mode in which players may revisit previous dungeons to raise funds and collect items, but without the ability to level up.

Among new items introduced are treasure boxes, which require money to be opened and may contain rare items that may only affect certain Pokémon and can be used to trade for rarer and more valuable items using a new shop. New items are also introduced to account for new evolution methods which do not translate well from the main series to Mystery Dungeon, like Probopass, Magnezone, Leafeon, or Glaceon.

=== Version exclusives ===
As with all Pokémon games, some Pokémon are exclusive to one version, although they may be unlocked on the other through the exchange of Wonder Mail codes. The Pokémon exclusive to Explorers of Time are Celebi, Combee, Lucario, Pachirisu, and Riolu, while the Pokémon exclusive to Explorers of Darkness are Burmy, Buneary, Lopunny, Mewtwo, and Rotom.

== Plot ==
The beach in Pokémon Mystery Dungeon: Explorers of Time, Darkness, and Sky. This is where the partner discovers the player at the start of the game.

The player is washed ashore by a storm and is discovered by the partner, a timid Pokémon who dreams of forming an exploration team. After teaming up to recover the partner's Relic Fragment from some bullies, the player, who has lost all memories except their name and the fact that they used to be human, agrees to form an exploration team to piece together their identity. The two enlist at the Wigglytuff Guild and begin training as adventurers. During this time, the player discovers that they can have visions of the future or past. Eventually, the authorities alert the guild that a criminal named Grovyle has been stealing artifacts called the Time Gears, which stabilize the flow of time in each region and cause time to stop when stolen. The player and partner attempt to intercept Grovyle, but are defeated. Afterwards, the guild enlists the aid of a famous explorer named Dusknoir, who explains that the player's ability to see through time is called the Dimensional Scream. Dusknoir reveals that he and Grovyle are from the future and that if the Time Gears are stolen, the Pokémon world will become paralyzed and turn into a dark, dismal region filled with scared and corrupted Pokémon. With assistance from the guardians of the Time Gears, Uxie, Mesprit and Azelf, Dusknoir successfully captures Grovyle and returns the Time Gears to their rightful places. Back in town, Dusknoir opens a Dimensional Hole to take Grovyle back to the future to face justice and bids farewell to the villagers, but suddenly grabs the player and partner and drags them into the portal with him.

The player and partner awaken in a prison in the future. After escaping a near execution with Grovyle by Dusknoir, they discover the world is still paralyzed. They learn from Grovyle that the paralysis was caused because of the collapse of Temporal Tower, which also corrupted its head occupant, Dialga, into a tyrannical being known as Primal Dialga. Grovyle exposes Dusknoir as a villainous agent sent to the present to capture him and reveals that he and a human companion traveled back in time to take the Time Gears to Temporal Tower in order to save the world; this human is actually the player. With the help of Celebi, a friend of Grovyle, the group manages to escape Dusknoir's group and return to the present. Grovyle reveals that, while it is true that time stops when a Time Gear is taken (not "stolen"), this effect is only temporary and that once the Time Gears are returned to Temporal Tower, time is permanently restored in all locations.

Arriving back to the present, the group enlists the help of the guild to take the Time Gears to Temporal Tower to restore time. While Grovyle gathers the Time Gears, the guild investigates Temporal Tower and discovers a way to reach the Hidden Land where it lies, using the partner's Relic Fragment. The player, the partner, and Grovyle travel to the Hidden Land, and are accosted by Dusknoir. He reveals to the player that if they succeed in changing the future, they and Grovyle will be erased from existence. Grovyle sacrifices himself to drag Dusknoir back to the future, and the player presses onward. They and the partner make their way to the top of Temporal Tower, defeat Primal Dialga and restore it to sanity, and replace the Time Gears and stop the planet's paralysis. On the way back, the player says a final goodbye to the partner before vanishing. After the credits, Dialga is deeply moved by the partner's grief over the player's death, and restores the player to the timeline as thanks for bringing time back under control. The player reappears at the beach and reunites with the overjoyed partner.

After the main story, the player and partner graduate from Wigglytuff Guild and move their base of operations to Sharpedo Bluff, the partner's old home. In Luminous Spring, they learn that neither the partner nor the player can evolve due to a distortion in space. After many missions and explorations, it is revealed that Darkrai was responsible for the events in the main story. The team, with the help of Palkia and Cresselia, defeats Darkrai, fixing the distortion and finally allowing the player and partner to evolve.

== Development ==
On March 20, 2007, Famitsu teased a sequel in the Pokémon Mystery Dungeon series. The then untitled game would make use of the Nintendo DS's dual screens and Wi-Fi support. Moreover, it was the first time Chunsoft made a sequel to a Mystery Dungeon game involving licensed characters other than Dragon Quest’s Torneko or Final Fantasy’s Chocobo. Two months after the announcement, Chunsoft confirmed the sequel to the series with an official title and the games being two versions like the Rescue Team games; Pokémon Mystery Dungeon: Explorers of Time and Pokémon Mystery Dungeon: Explorers of Darkness respectively. It confirmed the aforementioned new features explained in March, in addition to featuring Generation IV Pokémon and the ability to choose two of 16 characters; one as the protagonist and one as the partner similar to the previous games.

During early development, Shin-ichiro Tomie has thought of expressing the meetings and partings theme through bubbles at the game's prologue and end; a theme that is used throughout the series since its inauguration. Additionally, it was close to be scrapped from the final production, before the team was able to add it near the end. An idea was introduced where players could communicate between different hardware much like Pokémon Mystery Dungeon: Blue Rescue Team and Red Rescue Team between the Game Boy Advance and the Nintendo DS. In this case, they were focused on the Nintendo DS and a game made for the Wii, but was later scrapped due to lack of detailed information of the latter hardware. This idea was eventually recycled for the Nintendo DS remake of Shiren the Wanderer GB2: Magic Castle of the Desert, where players can exchange content with Shiren the Wanderer 3 via Wi-Fi connection until its discontinuation on July 27, 2011.

Later in August 2007, the duo received an official release date in Japan set for September 13, 2007 along with a playable demo during Pokémon Festa 2007. Four months after the games were released in Japan, a North American release was officially teased from Nintendo, with a pending date set for Q2 2008. The official release date was confirmed the month after, being April 28, 2008, before it was released a week earlier.

== Reception ==
Reception

Aggregate scores
Aggregator	Score
GameRankings	62.39% (Time); 61.25% (Darkness)
Metacritic	60/100 (Time); 59/100 (Darkness)

Review scores
Publication	Score
Eurogamer	7/10
GameSpot	6.5/10
GameSpy	4/5
GamesRadar+	2.5/5
IGN	6.5/10
Nintendo Power	7.5/10

The reviews for the games were average to positive. The games were scored as 60 and 59 out of 100 by Metacritic for Explorers of Time and Explorers of Darkness, respectively. GameSpot gave the games a score of 6.5 out of 10, criticising the dialogue and inconsistent visuals, but praising the story, soundtrack, Wi-Fi features and easier difficulty. IGN also rated the games 6.5 out of 10, criticising the repetitive and unoriginal gameplay but noted the story for its charm. GamesRadar+ on the other hand gave a score of 2.5 out of 5 (below average), saying that "Explorers of Darkness/Time is a rental at best" and that "Pokémon fans are better served by playing more Diamond/Pearl while waiting for the next Pokémon Ranger game". However, GameSpy gave the games a 4/5 star rating, praising them for their "classic dungeon-crawling gameplay, attractive setting and cheerful music". Both Mystery Dungeon: Explorers of Time and Explorers of Darkness have received a rating of 7.5 from Nintendo Power. Gamezone gave the games a rating of 7.8/10, praising their graphics, gameplay, and soundtrack.

During the 12th Annual Interactive Achievement Awards, the Academy of Interactive Arts & Sciences nominated Pokémon Mystery Dungeon: Explorers of Time for "Role-Playing Game of the Year", which ultimately went to Fallout 3.

Combined worldwide sales for Explorers of Time and Explorers of Darkness passed 4.5 million copies on March 31, 2009, and by March 31, 2010, adding the sales of Explorers of Sky totals the three games to over 5.90 million copies. Later, combined worldwide sales for the three Explorers games passed over 6.37 million copies according to Computer Entertainment Supplier's Association; 4.88 million for Explorers of Time and Explorers of Darkness and 1.49 million for Explorers of Sky. They are currently the best-selling games in the Pokémon Mystery Dungeon series, surpassing their predecessors. They are also the best-selling games in the Mystery Dungeon series in general; surpassing Squaresoft's Chocobo's Mysterious Dungeon and Enix's Torneko: The Last Hope, both accumulating 1.34 million and 759,000 copies respectively.

== Anime tie-in ==
A special episode of the Pokémon anime, Pokémon Mystery Dungeon: Explorers of Time & Darkness, (Note: ポケモン不思議のダンジョン 時の探検隊・闇の探検隊; lit. "Pokémon Mystery Dungeon Time Expedition & Darkness Expedition") was developed based on the game plot. Unlike previous special episodes, this does not take place in any continuity of the main storyline. It was first broadcast in Japan on September 9, 2007, as part of Pokémon Sunday.
