= Shiren the Wanderer: The Tower of Fortune and the Dice of Fate =

2010 roguelike video game

- Cover art featuring Shiren
- Developer: Chunsoft (Note: Subsequent releases developed by Spike Chunsoft)
- Publishers: Chunsoft: Original; JP: Chunsoft Plus; WW: Spike Chunsoft; NA/EU: Aksys Games (Vita)
- Directors: Yoriki Daigo (DS); Hideyuki Shinozaki (Vita); Tomoya Shinozaki (Switch, Win)
- Producers: Yasuhiro Iizuka; Koichi Nakamura (DS); Frank "Bo" deWindt II (Vita)
- Designers: Asuka Honda; Ryota Kawasaki; Seiichiro Nagahata
- Programmers: Masayasu Yamamoto; Hiroaki Sakabe; Toru Sadamasa
- Artist: Kaoru Hasegawa
- Writer: Masato Kato
- Composer: Hayato Matsuo
- Series: Shiren the Wanderer; Mystery Dungeon
- Platforms: Nintendo DS; PlayStation Vita; Nintendo Switch; Microsoft Windows iOS; Android
- Release: Nintendo DS: JP: December 9, 2010; PlayStation Vita: JP: June 4, 2015; NA/EU: July 26, 2016; Nintendo Switch, Windows: WW: December 2, 2020; JP: December 3, 2020; iOS, Android: JP: March 29, 2022
- Genres: Roguelike, role-playing
- Modes: Single-player, multiplayer

Shiren the Wanderer: The Tower of Fortune and the Dice of Fate (Note: Known in Japan as Fushigi no Dungeon: Fūrai no Shiren 5: Fortune Tower to Unmei no Dice (Japanese: 不思議のダンジョン 風来(ふうらい)のシレン5 フォーチュンタワーと運命(うんめい)のダイス, Hepburn: Fushigi no Danjon Fūrai no Shiren 5 Fōchun Tawā to Unmei no Daisu; lit. Mystery Dungeon: Shiren the Wanderer 5: Fortune Tower and the Dice of Fate)) is a roguelike role-playing video game developed by Chunsoft. It is the fifth main entry in the Shiren the Wanderer series, which is a subset of the larger Mystery Dungeon series. It was originally released for the Nintendo DS in 2010 in Japan.

An expanded version (Note: Known in Japan as Fushigi no Dungeon: Fūrai no Shiren 5 Plus: Fortune Tower to Unmei no Dice (Japanese: 不思議のダンジョン 風来(ふうらい)のシレン5plus フォーチュンタワーと運命(うんめい)のダイス, Hepburn: Fushigi no Danjon Fūrai no Shiren 5 Plus Fōchun Tawā to Unmei no Daisu; lit. Mystery Dungeon: Shiren the Wanderer 5 Plus: Fortune Tower and the Dice of Fate)) was released for the PlayStation Vita in 2015 in Japan and in 2016 in North America and Europe. A further expanded version for Nintendo Switch and Microsoft Windows, featuring additional dungeons, was released in 2020, and a Smartphone port of the latest version was released in Japan in 2022.

== Gameplay ==
The Tower of Fortune and the Dice of Fate is a roguelike role-playing video game in which the player traverses randomized dungeons and fights monsters. In dungeons, the player can find treasures, as well as items and equipment that they can collect and use. If the player dies, they lose their items, their level resets to one, the dungeons change, and the monsters change positions. Like in Shiren the Wanderer 4, the game has a day-and-night system; as the in-game sun sets, the player character's vision decreases, making it impossible to see enemies that are too far away. At some points in dungeons, the player needs to solve puzzles.

== Plot ==
The story is set between the events of Shiren the Wanderer GB2 and Shiren the Wanderer 3, and follows Shiren, a wanderer and silent protagonist, who is accompanied by Koppa, a talking ferret. The two are climbing the Tower of Fortune, as they have heard legends of a god that can change their fate. The story begins as Oyu, a young girl from a small town, suffers from an illness and Jirokichi, her childhood friend, heads to the tower to change her fate. They are guided through the tower by Tao, a girl in a panda suit, and encounter other characters throughout the story: Okon and Koharu; Gen; and Kojirouta. Shiren and Jirokichi eventually climb the tower to fight against the ruler of fate himself, Reeva.

== Development ==
=== Nintendo DS release ===
The game was directed by Yoriki Daigo, keeping the same role as in Shiren the Wanderer 4. The Tower of Fortune and the Dice of Fate was first teased in August as part of Sega's exhibition titles before the Tokyo Game Show 2010. The game was released in December of the same year. During an interview with Koichi Nakamura, it was confirmed that this game and Shiren the Wanderer 4 were developed simultaneously, though it was hard to come up with new ideas for the former title. In that case, they have added back items and monsters originally featured in the latter. This would be re-confirmed by Daigo in a blog posted by the company. Unique to this series is the possibility to play with another player locally in co-op mode, compared to Shiren the Wanderer 3 who had a similar option exclusively for the versus mode.

Pre-ordered copies of the game were bundled with a soundtrack CD and a booklet about the series' history. As a crossover promotion, a Nonary Game bracelet from Chunsoft's Nine Hours, Nine Persons, Nine Doors was included as an in-game item.

=== PlayStation Vita port ===
In commemoration of the 20th anniversary of the Shiren the Wanderer series, a PlayStation Vita version titled Shiren the Wanderer 5 Plus, which includes additional dungeons and the ability to look around using the right stick, was released in June 2015 in Japan. A worldwide release by Aksys Games came a year later in July, with the game titled as Shiren the Wanderer: The Tower of Fortune and the Dice of Fate.

=== Nintendo Switch and Steam ports ===
Nintendo Switch and Steam ports were directed by Tomoya Shinozaki. The idea of porting the game to other consoles comes from when Sony ended production of the PlayStation Vita in 2019. A Microsoft Windows version was implied to be in development during The International 2019 Dota 2 Tournament held in Shanghai in August, although no official announcement had been made at the time. In 2020, Nintendo Switch and Steam ports were released worldwide on December 2, a day after the series's 25th anniversary. These versions feature three brand new dungeons, a livestream display and the game being translated in both traditional and simplified Chinese, making it the first Shiren the Wanderer game to have an official Chinese translation. The Live Display HUD option was added to this port because Shinozaki used to watch streamers playing games from the series on live before joining the company. For the Steam version, the team opted for keyboard compatibility as it was harder to add it than the Switch version, the latter having the same button layout as the PlayStation Vita.

=== Smartphone port ===
iOS and Android ports of the game were released in March 2022. These versions can be played in English and Chinese. Some changes include auto saving, the ability to play it horizontally or vertically compared to the smartphone release of Mystery Dungeon: Shiren the Wanderer, among smaller ones.

== Release ==
The game was originally released in Japan by Chunsoft for the Nintendo DS on December 9, 2010. The PlayStation Vita version was released by Spike Chunsoft on June 4, 2015, in Japan, and by Aksys Games on July 26, 2016, in North America and Europe. Since 2020, the game would be released only by Spike Chunsoft, and excludes Aksys Games for its western release. The Nintendo Switch and Steam versions were released worldwide on December 2 the same year, and a day later in Japan. A limited-time, physical copy of the game in English held by Limited Run Games was released on January 12, 2021. The smartphone versions were released on March 29, 2022, exclusively in Japan.

== Reception ==
Reception

Aggregate score
Aggregator	Score
Metacritic	79/100 (PS Vita); 75/100 (NS)

Review scores
Publication	Score
Destructoid	8/10
Famitsu	35/40 (DS); 36/40 (PS Vita)
GameRevolution	3/5
Hardcore Gamer	4.5/5 (PS Vita); 4/5 (NS)
Nintendo Life	7/10
Nintendo World Report	8.5/10
PlayStation Official Magazine – UK	8/10
RPGamer	3.5/5 (PS Vita); 3.5/5 (NS)
USgamer	5/5

The game was well received by critics on PlayStation Vita and Nintendo Switch, according to review aggregator Metacritic, where it was the sixth-best reviewed PlayStation Vita game of 2016.

The Switch port of this game exceeded the company's expectation in terms of reputation and sales overall. This success consequently green-lit the development of a new Shiren the Wanderer game soon after, being Shiren the Wanderer: The Mystery Dungeon of Serpentcoil Island, but also gave the series a new title over 13 years after this game.

=== Sales ===
Across all versions of The Tower of Fortune and the Dice of Fate, it has sold over 500,000 copies as of December 2022, making it selling as many copies as all versions of Mystery Dungeon: Shiren the Wanderer accumulated. The Nintendo DS version sold 65,137 copies by the end of 2011 and an additional 16,573 copies sold from the Chunsoft Selection edition of the same game by the end of 2012, granting a total of 81,710 copies sold in Japan. The PlayStation Vita version debuted on second place on Media Create's weekly list of best-selling video games in Japan, with 16,224 copies sold; on its second week, it sank to ninth place with 6,060 copies, and on its third it sank to thirteenth place with 3,553 copies sold. By the end of 2015, it was the 168th best selling game of the year in Japan with 25,681 copies. The Nintendo Switch version debuted on twelfth place on Famitsu's weekly list of best-selling video games in Japan, with 19,594 copies sold. This version would also be placed sixth on the Japanese Nintendo eShop's Top 20 best-selling games of December 2020. According to Steam Spy, the Steam release has sold over 200,000 copies.
