= Kaoru Hasegawa =

Japanese game artist

- 長谷川 薫
- Born: 1971 (age 54–55)
- Occupation: Artist
- Years active: 1994–present
- Employer: Spike Chunsoft
- Known for: Shiren the Wanderer series

Kaoru Hasegawa (長谷川 薫, Hasegawa Kaoru; born 1971) is a Japanese game artist and part of Spike Chunsoft's affiliation. Since 1994, he contributes to the company, with the Mystery Dungeon franchise as the main character designer for the Shiren the Wanderer series since its first title in 1995, and as an artist for other video game titles.

== Career ==
Before working in the Mystery Dungeon franchise, Hasegawa has contributed in Kamaitachi no Yoru as an artist. He later took part during the production of Mystery Dungeon: Shiren the Wanderer for the Super Famicom. In an interview with Chunsoft, they wanted someone who could work on the then sequel of Torneko's Great Adventure: Mystery Dungeon, but he was not familiar with the title, nor the roguelike genre at the time of the interview. After being interested in the genre by playing through the game and being employed in the company, he was able work in the game. The game was set in feudal Japan, as the game's scenarist Shin-ichiro Tomie decided to set the game in this theme instead of a western art style, like Akira Toriyama's Dragon Quest characters. Many drafts were made for the silent protagonist of the eponymous game, and its mascot monster the Mamel, but most of them were lost. Since then, he has contributed to the series as a character designer, occasionally as an art director like in Shiren the Wanderer 2.

Hasegawa has taken part in few events related to the series. In 2012, during the first Nico Nico Game Master event, him and Tomie appeared in the finale of a real-time attack of the first Shiren the Wanderer game. For the 20th anniversary of the Shiren the Wanderer series, he appeared in an exhibition of the series' artworks and performed a live painting on July 11, 2015. Likewise for the series' 25th anniversary, another exhibition was hold featuring his works where he took part shortly in the event. Additionally, he has contributed a new artwork for the Steam and Nintendo Switch port of Shiren the Wanderer: The Tower of Fortune and the Dice of Fate.

Unrelated to the Mystery Dungeon franchise, he would contribute as an artist in other video games and media. One such was a towel featuring both Shiren the Wanderer′s Koppa and Danganronpa′s Monokuma during an exhibition of goods from the company and the release of Kenka Bancho Otome. Another artwork was made for the PlayStation's 20th anniversary, along with many other video game artists.

== Works ==
=== Video games ===
Year	Title	Role	Ref.
1994	Kamaitachi no Yoru	Artist	
1995	Mystery Dungeon: Shiren the Wanderer	Original artist	
1995	BS Shiren the Wanderer: Save Surala	Original artist	
1996	Shiren the Wanderer GB: Monster of Moonlight Village	Character design	
1997	Giten Megami Tensei: Tokyo Mokushiroku	Programmer	
2000	Shiren the Wanderer 2: Shiren's Castle and the Oni Invasion	Art director, character design	
2001	Shiren the Wanderer GB2: Magic Castle of the Desert	Character design	
2002	Shiren the Wanderer Gaiden: Asuka the Swordswoman	Character design	
2004	Shiren Monsters: Netsal	Character design	
2005	Pokémon Mystery Dungeon: Red Rescue Team and Blue Rescue Team	Background illustration	
2008	Shiren the Wanderer	Character design	
2010	Shiren the Wanderer 4: The Eye of God and the Devil's Navel	Character design	
2010	Shiren the Wanderer: The Tower of Fortune and the Dice of Fate	Character design	
2010	Trick × Logic	Character design	
2012	Pokémon Mystery Dungeon: Gates to Infinity	2D Artist	
2012	Zero Escape: Virtue's Last Reward	Visual department	
2015	Pokémon Super Mystery Dungeon	2D Artist	
2015	Etrian Mystery Dungeon	Character design	
2017	Zero Escape: The Nonary Games	Visual department	
2018	Seikimatsu Days	Character design	
2019	Cadence of Hyrule	Additional promotional artist	
2019	Tech Tech Tech Tech	Monster design	
2024	Shiren the Wanderer: The Mystery Dungeon of Serpentcoil Island	Character design	

=== Other media ===
Year	Title	Role	Ref.
2004	Shiren the Wanderer: Flowers Dancing in the Golden Town Amteca	Character artist	
2006	Pokémon Mystery Dungeon: Team Go-Getters Out of the Gate!	Special thanks	
