= Shiren the Wanderer 2: Shiren's Castle and the Oni Invasion =

2000 video game

- Cover art, featuring Shiren and Koppa
- Developer: Chunsoft
- Publisher: Nintendo
- Director: Shin-ichiro Tomie
- Producer: Koichi Nakamura
- Designer: Kouji Malta
- Programmer: Tadashi Fukuzawa
- Artist: Kaoru Hasegawa
- Writers: Shin-ichiro Tomie; Kazuya Asano
- Composer: Koichi Sugiyama
- Series: Shiren the Wanderer; Mystery Dungeon
- Platform: Nintendo 64
- Release: JP: 27 September 2000
- Genres: Role-playing, roguelike
- Mode: Single-player

Shiren the Wanderer 2: Shiren's Castle and the Oni Invasion (Note: Known in Japan as Fushigi no Dungeon: Fūrai no Shiren 2: Oni Shūrai! Shiren-jō! (Japanese: 不思議のダンジョン 風来(ふうらい)のシレン2 鬼襲来(おにしゅうらい)!シレン城(じょう)!, Hepburn: Fushigi no Danjon Fūrai no Shiren 2 Oni Shūrai! Shiren Jō!; lit. Mystery Dungeon: Shiren the Wanderer 2: Demon Invasion! Shiren Castle).) is a 2000 role-playing video game developed by Chunsoft and published by Nintendo for the Nintendo 64. It is the second main entry in the Shiren the Wanderer series, itself part of the larger Mystery Dungeon series, and was released in Japan on September 27. The game follows Shiren, a boy who aims to defend a village from attacking demons by building a castle; he finds building materials and other items by exploring dungeons.

Shiren the Wanderer 2 was the first in the series to use 3D graphics, done as a way to evolve the series; the development team focused on creating original features and used the 3D engine to enable free roaming through open environments. It was originally planned for release on the 64DD, but development was later moved to the regular Nintendo 64 instead.

== Gameplay ==
Shiren the Wanderer 2 is a role-playing game in which players aim to build a castle. To achieve this, the player must gather stone, iron, water, earth, and wood to use as building materials. After constructing the castle, the player must defend it from attacking demons and defeat the demons' leader. The building materials are found within various dungeons spread throughout the game's open world; more difficult dungeons house higher-quality materials, which are more durable against the demons and less likely to break.

There are two types of dungeons: "shuffle dungeons", which consist of irregularly shaped areas, and "random dungeons", which consist of square areas connected by long hallways. Each time the player enters a dungeon, its layout and the locations of items and monsters within it change. The dungeons include traps that the player can uncover using their sword. The game is turn-based, with enemies taking one turn for every action the player performs, such as walking one step or attacking. To damage an enemy, the player must be close to them; the player can move diagonally to get closer to the enemy in fewer turns.

The player can use various types of weapons in battle; they start with only a katana, but can find weapons such as broadswords and sickles throughout the game. The player also finds various items while exploring dungeons, including health items, as well as ones used for defense and offense. In addition to the items found in dungeons, the player can buy food and power-ups from wandering merchants. The player can receive help from friendly non-player characters, each with different abilities: the water imp Himakichi can swim, unlike Shiren; Asuka can equip swords, shields, and armor; and Riku can use his slingshot for ranged attacks.

== Plot ==
The story of Shiren the Wanderer 2 is set before the events of the original Mystery Dungeon: Shiren the Wanderer and follows Shiren, a ten-year-old boy who travels through the mountains with his weasel friend Koppa. They come across the village of Natane, where they stop to eat. While they are eating, a tribe of demons attacks the village, prompting Shiren to decide to build a castle to defend the village and its villagers.

== Development and release ==
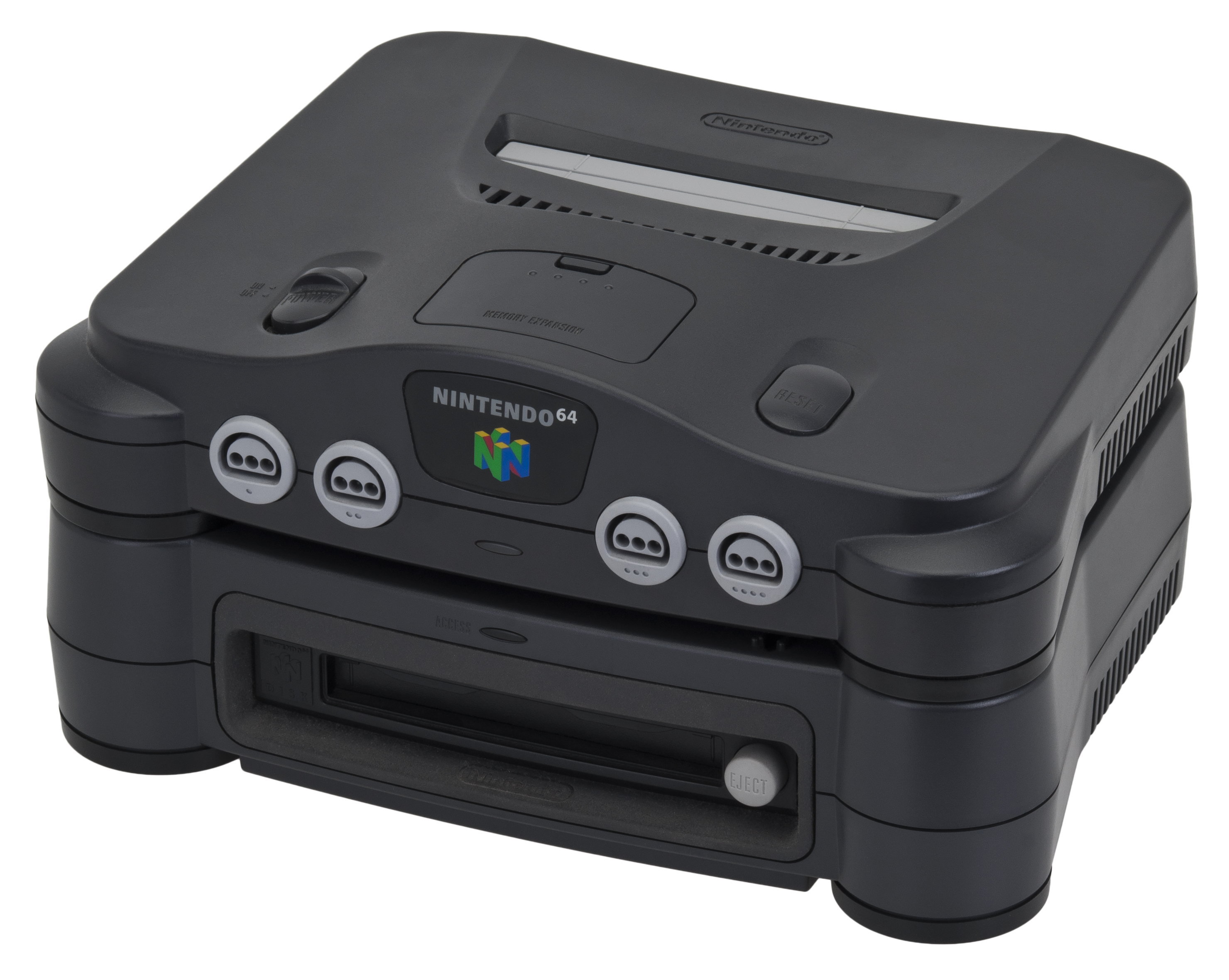
Shiren the Wanderer 2 was originally planned as a 64DD game.

Shiren the Wanderer 2 was developed by Chunsoft over nearly three years, following the completion of Shiren the Wanderer GB on Game Boy. It was produced by Koichi Nakamura, directed and written by Shin-ichiro Tomie, with planning and game balance handled by Seiichiro Nagahata. Initially planned as a 64DD game, it was later developed as a cartridge-based Nintendo 64 game. It was the first game in the series to use 3D graphics; according to Nakamura, they aimed to evolve the series by introducing a 3D engine that allowed for free roaming and open environments. The team focused on creating original features, contrasting the concurrently developed Game Boy Color game Shiren the Wanderer GB2, which adhered to "traditional dungeon types" due to the hardware limitations of the Game Boy Color. The castle-building mechanic was considered one of the game's core elements, and the team developed that aspect first before implementing the dungeons.

Shin-ichiro Tomie explained that some content was cut during development but was later recycled in Torneko: The Last Hope. The team encountered many trial-and-error challenges due to the series' transition from 2D to 3D on the Nintendo 64, but they managed to blend both styles in the game. Additionally, the team created the Monster Pot, a gameplay element allowing players to collect monsters in dungeons, along with a place to view their collection called Mononoke Kingdom. This feature was reused in later Mystery Dungeon titles, notably in Dragon Quest: Shōnen Yangus to Fushigi no Dungeon, and in the Pokémon Mystery Dungeon series, though without the use of a pot. The gameplay was planned by Kouji Malta, one of the programmers for EarthBound and Homeland, and was inspired by the German board game Catan, where Shiren combines materials found in dungeons to rebuild the town.

The game was originally planned for release in April 2000 in Japan, but it was delayed and launched on September 27; it has not been made available in English. In 2010, Chunsoft mentioned that it was possible they would re-release the game on the Wii's Virtual Console if enough demand was shown by fans of the series, but there were no plans at that time. Chunsoft also considered re-releasing the game for the Nintendo DS at one point, but ultimately decided to port the original Mystery Dungeon: Shiren the Wanderer to that platform instead.

Although the game was not officially released in English, a fan translation was developed and released in September 2021, 21 years after its initial release in Japan, as a patch.

== Reception ==
Reception

Review scores
Publication	Score
Dengeki Nintendo 64	28/30
Famitsu 64+	38/40
Weekly Famitsu	36/40

In their cross-review, Famitsu scored the game 38 out of 40, with individual reviewers giving it 10, 9, 9, and 10; this was one of the highest-scoring games of 2000, with only seven other games scoring 36 or higher that year. During its debut week, it was the best-selling game in Japan, with 147,864 copies sold. By the end of 2000, it was the 49th best-selling game of the year in Japan, with a total of 238,338 copies sold; an additional 45,653 copies were sold the following year, for a grand total of 283,991 copies sold.

Writers for IGN said that the dungeon exploration could get monotonous; they noted that what they played was decent, but that they "weren't blown away", and that the gameplay, while acceptable, was plain. They enjoyed the game's graphics, stating that the characters and landscapes were detailed to a level that was "uncommon of a first-generation product" and that the 3D effects helped "beautify" the environments.
