= Shiren the Wanderer GB: Monster of Moonlight Village =

1996 video game

- Game Boy cover art, featuring Shiren and Koppa.
- Developers: Aquamarine; Android; Spike Chunsoft
- Publisher: Chunsoft (Note: Subsequent releases published by Spike Chunsoft.)
- Director: Seiichiro Nagahata
- Producer: Koichi Nakamura
- Designer: Shin-ichiro Tomie
- Programmer: Kazumi Ogawa
- Artist: Kaoru Hasegawa
- Writer: Shin-ichiro Tomie
- Composer: Koichi Sugiyama
- Series: Shiren the Wanderer; Mystery Dungeon
- Platforms: Game Boy; Microsoft Windows mobile devices Android
- Release: November 22, 1996: Game Boy; JP: November 22, 1996 Microsoft Windows; JP: December 8, 1999 Internet Edition; JP: December 20, 2002 DX; JP: April 27, 2010 Android; JP: May 27, 2011 Smart Pass; JP: March 1, 2012
- Genres: Roguelike, role-playing
- Mode: Single-player

Shiren the Wanderer GB: Monster of Moonlight Village (Note: Known in Japan as Fushigi no Dungeon: Fūrai no Shiren GB: 〜Tsukikage-mura no Kaibutsu〜 (Japanese: 不思議のダンジョン 風来(ふうらい)のシレンGB 〜月(つき)影(かげ)村(むら)の怪(かい)物(ぶつ)〜, Hepburn: Fushigi no Danjon Fūrai no Shiren GB 〜Tsukikage-mura no Kaibutsu〜; lit. Mystery Dungeon: Shiren the Wanderer GB 〜Moonlight Village Monster〜).) is a roguelike role-playing video game in the Mystery Dungeon and Shiren the Wanderer series developed by Aquamarine, and published by Chunsoft for the Game Boy in 1996. A Microsoft Windows remake, (Note: Shiren the Wanderer: Monster of Moonlight Village, known in Japan as Fushigi no Dungeon: Fūrai no Shiren: Tsukikage-mura no Kaibutsu (Japanese: 不思議のダンジョン 風来(ふうらい)のシレン 月(つき)影(かげ)村(むら)の怪(かい)物(ぶつ), Hepburn: Fushigi no Danjon Fūrai no Shiren Tsukikage-mura no Kaibutsu; lit. Mystery Dungeon: Shiren the Wanderer: Moonlight Village Monster).) featuring enhanced graphics similar to Mystery Dungeon: Shiren the Wanderer on the Super Famicom would be released in 1999, then later re-released with internet compatibility in 2002. In 2010, the game was ported to Japanese feature phones, which was then ported to Android in 2011 making it the first Mystery Dungeon title released on Android.

== Gameplay ==
In consideration of the performance of the non-colored Game Boy, the level of the monster expressed by their difference color models are displayed with a superscript number. When using the Super Game Boy add-on, a unique picture frame is displayed and color display is possible. Fay's Puzzles" are now selected from the main menu with 50 puzzles available initially, and a further 50 unlocked after beating the main story dungeon.

The Microsoft Windows port came with tools that allow the player to create own puzzles, with an additional 55 puzzles available to download from the official website. Players who purchased the internet edition could upload their puzzles for other players to play and rate. In addition, the Internet edition was equipped with additional features such as Wanderer Rescues and a "Weekly Dungeon".

== Plot ==
The story happens between Mystery Dungeon: Shiren the Wanderer and Shiren the Wanderer: The Mystery Dungeon of Serpentcoil Island. The game's plot is about rescuing a sacrificed child and unravel the mystery of the monsters that plagues Tsukikage Village, where Shiren is stopped by during his trip.

== Development and release ==
The game was developed by Aquamarine and published by Chunsoft, making the first Shiren the Wanderer game to be developed by another company.

The original version on Game Boy was released on November 22, 1996. The Microsoft Windows remake of the game was released on December 8, 1999, and its Internet Edition was later released as a digital download on its official website on May 4, 2002. The package edition was later released on December 20, 2002 via Chunsoft's online store One Click Content Shop. Chunsoft released an offline downloadable content on June 30, 2005 in anticipation of ending sales and shutting down its online service on January 31, 2006. The Android port, based on its Keitai port, was released on May 27, 2011, and its Smart Pass edition was later released on March 1, 2012.

== Reception ==
Reception

Review score
Publication	Score
Famitsu	9/10, 10/10, 9/10, 8/10

In a "Cross Review" from the video game magazine Famitsu, the game obtained the Platinum Hall of Fame in 1996, with a total of 36 points out of 40 by the writers. In the "Game Report Card", the review from the reader's vote of Family Computer Magazine gave the game a score of 23.7 points out of 30. In addition, in the Japanese video game magazine "Transcendence Daigirin '98 Spring Edition", it was positively evaluated thanks to the unique factors of the game, such as having different difficulty levels. On the other hand, "Game Boy Perfect Catalog" pointed out that the feeling of completing a dungeon, after repeatedly searching for one whose rooms changes each time it enters a new floor, is a common element from this series.
