= Shiren the Wanderer GB2: Magic Castle of the Desert =

2001 video game

- Cover art for the Game Boy Color version
- Developer: Chunsoft
- Publishers: Chunsoft; Sega (DS)
- Director: Seiichiro Nagahata
- Programmer: Hidefumi Itano
- Artist: Kaoru Hasegawa
- Writer: Shin-ichiro Tomie
- Composer: Hayato Matsuo
- Series: Shiren the Wanderer; Mystery Dungeon
- Platforms: Game Boy Color, Nintendo DS
- Release: Game Boy Color: JP: July 19, 2001; Nintendo DS: JP: November 13, 2008
- Genres: Roguelike, role-playing
- Mode: Single-player

Shiren the Wanderer GB2: Magic Castle of the Desert (Note: Known in Japan as Fushigi no Dungeon: Fūrai no Shiren GB2: Sabaku no Majō (Japanese: 不思議のダンジョン 風来(ふうらい)のシレンGB2 〜砂(さ)漠(ばく)の魔(ま)城(じょう)〜, Hepburn: Fushigi no Danjon Fūrai no Shiren GB2 Sabaku no Majō; lit. Mystery Dungeon: Shiren the Wanderer GB2: Magic Castle of the Desert)) is a roguelike role-playing video game developed by Chunsoft. It is part of the Mystery Dungeon series, and is a sequel to Shiren the Wanderer GB: Monster of Moonlight Village. It was originally released for the Game Boy Color by Chunsoft in 2001. A remake (Note: Shiren the Wanderer DS2: Magic Castle of the Desert, known in Japan as Fushigi no Dungeon: Fūrai no Shiren DS2: Sabaku no Majō (Japanese: 不思議のダンジョン 風来(ふうらい)のシレンDS2 〜砂(さ)漠(ばく)の魔(ま)城(じょう)〜, Hepburn: Fushigi no Danjon Fūrai no Shiren DS2 Sabaku no Majō; lit. Mystery Dungeon: Shiren the Wanderer DS2: Magic Castle of the Desert)) for the Nintendo DS was released by Sega later in 2008.

== Gameplay ==
Shiren the Wanderer GB2 is a roguelike, in which the player navigates through randomly generated dungeons, each filled with randomly placed enemy characters. Dungeons consist of larger box-like rooms, connected via narrow corridors. A map of the dungeon is automatically filled out as the player explores the area. While exploring dungeons, the player finds various items and weapons on the ground. Movement in the game is turn-based such that every time the player makes a move, the enemies move as well. If the player gets killed, they have to either restart the game from the beginning or get help from another player, who can enter the same dungeon and try to rescue them. Rescuing can be accomplished via a code that the rescuing player types into their game, or via the use of a Game Link Cable. In the Nintendo DS version of the game, players could rescue one another by connecting via the Internet.

The game has one town that functions as a hub with shops and a place to rest. Teleport scrolls allow the player to teleport to town from dungeons and retain all their items, but their level is reset to 1 and they have to play through the dungeon from the beginning again the next time they enter it.

== Plot ==
The game starts in the middle of a journey, with Shiren and his companion Koppa traveling through an enormous desert, exhausted. They collapse, after which guards take them to a desert fortress and chain them to a wall. A princess enters the dungeon and unshackles them, and Shiren escapes while being chased by the guards. He meets Pekeji, who claims to be Shiren's younger brother, and who shows him to a dungeon that he thinks houses treasures. They enter it at night, but Pekeji falls into a trap, and Shiren has to save him.

== Development and release ==
The game was developed by Chunsoft and directed by Seiichirō Nagahata, with character designs by Kaoru Hasegawa, scenario and world design by Shin-ichiro Tomie, and with Hidefumi Itano being the lead programmer. Due to the hardware limitations of the Game Boy Color, they focused on developing "traditional dungeon types", as opposed to with the simultaneously developed Shiren the Wanderer 2 on the Nintendo 64, for which they created more original features. A unique gameplay element that would be used in later games from the Shiren the Wanderer series and other Mystery Dungeon crossovers is rescuing other players via passwords. When the internet started to develop in Japan in the late 1990s, they went with the idea of player sharing passwords instead of using the Game Boy's Game Link Cable in order to help others, since there were not many owners of the cable.

The game was released by Chunsoft on July 19, 2001 for the Game Boy Color. A remake of the game, Shiren the Wanderer DS2, was released in November 2008 for the Nintendo DS, by Sega. This version included online functions, such as leaderboards and item trading; Sega shut down the servers for these services on October 31, 2011. To promote the game, Shiren the Wanderer GB2-themed potato chips were sold, with cards with illustrations based on the game bundled with the bags.

== Reception ==
Reception

Review score
Publication	Score	
Publication	DS	GBC
Famitsu	33/40	10/10, 9/10, 9/10, 10/10

Writers for Famitsu called Shiren the Wanderer DS2 a "beautifully done remake" and a masterpiece, and said that the difficulty felt well-balanced, and gave the Game Boy Color version the highest score the publication had given to a game on that platform.

Spencer at Siliconera noted that the game felt much more accessible than the first Mystery Dungeon: Shiren the Wanderer, but that the level-reset and having to restart dungeons after teleporting to the town, while an improvement, still was frustrating. He appreciated how the story and the multiple dungeons made progress feel more tangible than in the first Shiren the Wanderer, making it less of an "endless journey". A feature he appreciated in the Nintendo DS version was the ability to change what is shown on the top screen without entering an options menu; he enjoyed being able to switch between a map screen and a text summary of what was happening in the dungeon. Jeremy Parish at 1UP.com said that, just based on how it looks, one could not tell that Shiren the Wanderer DS2 originally was a Game Boy game, as the graphical overhaul made it look even better than Mystery Dungeon: Shiren the Wanderer on the Nintendo DS. Based on a preview of the game, he said that there was "little doubt" that the game would be as good as the first Shiren the Wanderer, which he thought was a "top-notch dungeon crawler".

=== Sales ===
According to Geimin, both versions of Shiren the Wanderer: Magic Castle of the Desert have accumulated over 275,000 copies in total. The Game Boy Color version had sold 172,578 copies by December 2001, and the Nintendo DS version had sold 103,299 copies by January 2010.
