= Shiren the Wanderer Gaiden: Asuka the Swordswoman =

2002 video game

- Developers: Neverland; Chunsoft
- Publishers: Sega; Win; Chunsoft
- Director: Naoyuki Ukeda
- Artists: Nao Ikeda; Kaoru Hasegawa; Shinichi Shibasaki
- Writer: Hiroaki Saito
- Composers: Koichi Sugiyama; Hayato Matsuo
- Series: Shiren the Wanderer; Mystery Dungeon
- Platforms: Dreamcast, Microsoft Windows
- Release: Dreamcast: JP: February 7, 2002; Microsoft Windows: JP: December 20, 2002; Internet Edition: JP: February 27, 2004
- Genres: Roguelike, role-playing
- Mode: Single-player

Shiren the Wanderer Gaiden: Asuka the Swordswoman (Note: Known in Japan as Fushigi no Dungeon: Fūrai no Shiren Gaiden: Onna Kenshi Asuka Kenzan! (Japanese: 不思議(ふしぎ)のダンジョン 風来(ふうらい)のシレン外伝(がいでん) 女(おん)剣士(なけんし)アスカ見参(けんざん)!, Hepburn: Fushigi no Danjon Fūrai no Shiren Gaiden Onna Kenshi Asuka Kenzan!; lit. Mystery Dungeon: Shiren the Wanderer Side Story: Female Swordsman Asuka Arrives!).) is a roguelike role-playing video game developed by Neverland and Chunsoft. It is part of the Mystery Dungeon series, and is a side story based on the Shiren the Wanderer series. It was originally released for the Dreamcast by Sega on February 7, 2002. A Microsoft Windows port (Note: Shiren the Wanderer Gaiden: Asuka the Swordswoman for Windows, known in Japan as Fushigi no Dungeon: Fūrai no Shiren Gaiden: Onna Kenshi Asuka Kenzan! for Windows (Japanese: 不思議(ふしぎ)のダンジョン 風来(ふうらい)のシレン外伝(がいでん) 女(おん)剣士(なけんし)アスカ見参(けんざん)! for Windows, Hepburn: Fushigi no Danjon Fūrai no Shiren Gaiden Onna Kenshi Asuka Kenzan! for Windows; lit. Mystery Dungeon: Shiren the Wanderer Side Story: Female Swordsman Asuka Arrives!).) was later released on December 20, 2002 and re-released later with internet compatibility on February 27, 2004, both published by Chunsoft.

== Gameplay ==
Instead of the conventional main character Shiren, the game's protagonist is this time Asuka, who was a friend of Shiren back in the Nintendo 64 title Shiren the Wanderer 2.

=== Online features ===
New to the Mystery Dungeon series at the time was the addition of online support. The Dreamcast version of the online service, "Sanzu no Kawaraban", ended on August 31, 2002. The Windows version had ended on September 30, 2005, but was then distributed from Spike Chunsoft's official website as free downloadable content. Through the online support, players could receive new dungeons, called either "Weekly Dungeon"; a dungeon that could be played online on a weekly basis, or "Challenge Dungeon"; the dungeon's difficulty would be increased and useful items would appear less frequently.

== Plot ==
As the title suggests, it is a side story of the Shiren the Wanderer series. The plot of Swordswoman Asuka Arrives! is divided into two, with an ending corresponding for each story: the Koga and Hachimaten plot.

=== Koga ===
During the trip, Asuka stops at Jurokuya no Sato, a small rural village in a country rich in nature called Tenwakuni, and reunites with the narrative Itachi Koppa who was staying there. In the country, there have been a series of incidents in which the Koga Ninja army, which originally used to exterminate monsters as a livelihood, seem to have recently started attacking travelers. After seeing the upset villagers, Asuka decides to head towards Koga's Castle, the base of the Koga Ninja Army, to find out why he has changed suddenly.

=== Hachimaten ===
A trouble happened in the festival; it cannot be held because the "festival's equipment" required for the famous "Reeva Festival" has been stolen by a monster called Hachimaten. Along with the large number of visitors who gathered under the shrine maiden Koyori, the organizer of the festival, Asuka is also called to the "Trial of ..." by one of the Eight Rivanian Beast Gods, besides the God of Trade, Sakai, in order to recover the ritual vessels.

== Releases ==
Supervised and developed by Neverland, the Dreamcast version was published by Sega on February 7, 2002, while the Windows version was published by Chunsoft on December 20 the same year. An online feature was added in its reprint on February 27, 2004.

== Reception ==
In an interview with the company, it was answered that a potential remake would be difficult to produce due to "various circumstances including copyright". As of 2020, the Windows port's price has increased to above ¥50,000, which is higher than its initial price back in 2004.

=== Sales ===
The Dreamcast version of Swordswoman Asuka Arrives! had sold 50,750 copies solely in Japan by the end of 2002. Despite the game not selling a lot compared to other titles in the series, there were strong calls from the community for either a resale, port, or remake of the game.

=== Appearances in other games ===
Similarly to Shiren, the game's protagonist Asuka appeared in other video games that were developed and, or published by Spike Chunsoft. A costume based on her can be worn in the Etrian Mystery Dungeon sub-series labeled as the Wanderer class, if the character is female. Asuka, along with Shiren, appear in RPG Maker MV, and as alternative costumes for Cadence in Crypt of the NecroDancer with characters from series developed by Spike Chunsoft such as Danganronpa and Kenka Bancho.
