= Shiren the Wanderer 4: The Eye of God and the Devil's Navel =

2010 video game

- Nintendo DS cover art
- Developer(s): Chunsoft
- Publisher(s): DS: Spike; PSP: Spike Chunsoft
- Director(s): Hironori Ishigami; Yoriki Daigo
- Producer(s): Toshinori Asai; Yasuhiko Sameshima; Mitsutoshi Sakurai
- Designer(s): Seiichiro Nagahata; Hiroyoshi Umetani; Shonosuke Morisue
- Programmer(s): Naomi Kaneda
- Artist(s): Kaoru Hasegawa
- Writer(s): Masato Kato
- Composer(s): Hayato Matsuo
- Series: Shiren the Wanderer; Mystery Dungeon
- Platform(s): Nintendo DS, PlayStation Portable
- Release: Nintendo DS: JP: February 25, 2010; PlayStation Portable: JP: October 18, 2012
- Genre(s): Role-playing
- Mode(s): Single-player

Shiren the Wanderer 4: The Eye of God and the Devil's Navel (Note: Known in Japan as Fushigi no Dungeon: Fūrai no Shiren 4: Kami no Hitomi to Akuma no Heso (Japanese: 不思議のダンジョン 風来(ふうらい)のシレン4 神(かみ)の眼(ひとみ)と悪魔(あくま)のヘソ, Hepburn: Fushigi no Danjon Fūrai no Shiren 4 Kami no Me to Akuma no Heso, lit. Mystery Dungeon: Shiren the Wanderer 4: Eye of God and the Devil's Navel).) is a role-playing video game developed by Chunsoft and published by Spike. It is the fourth main entry in the Shiren the Wanderer series, which itself is a part of the larger Mystery Dungeon series. The game was originally released for the Nintendo DS in 2010; an expanded port was released for the PlayStation Portable in 2012 entitled Mystery Dungeon: Shiren the Wanderer 4 Plus: The Eye of God and the Devil's Navel. (Note: Known in Japan as Fushigi no Dungeon: Fūrai no Shiren 4 Plus: Kami no Hitomi to Akuma no Heso (Japanese: 不思議のダンジョン 風来(ふうらい)のシレン4plus 神(かみ)の眼(ひとみ)と悪魔(あくま)のヘソ, Hepburn: Fushigi no Danjon Fūrai no Shiren 4 Plus Kami no Me to Akuma no Heso, lit. Mystery Dungeon: Shiren the Wanderer 4 Plus: Eye of God and the Devil's Navel).)

== Gameplay ==
Shiren the Wanderer 4 is a role-playing video game in which the player explores dungeons that change each time they enter them and that are home to monsters. The game has a day-and-night system; when it gets dark, the dungeons get more difficult to navigate, and the type of monsters that are encountered are stronger. Dungeons consist of several rooms that are connected through narrow hallways; in some hallways, there are traps set up. At some points in dungeons, the player can hide behind doors that they can attack through but that enemies cannot pass through.

== Plot ==
After Shiren and the talking weasel Koppa suffer a shipwreck, they are found by the inhabitants of an island, who think they are monsters; they are tied to a stake, but are saved by the game's heroine, Kamina. As a result, Kamina gets tied up herself by a jaguar priest who sends Shiren to find the Jaguar's Eye to prove that he is not a demon.

== Development ==
The game was developed by Chunsoft, and published by Spike. It was originally released for the Nintendo DS in Japan on February 25, 2010; an expanded version, Shiren the Wanderer 4 Plus, which includes three new dungeons and Twitter support, was released by Spike Chunsoft for the PlayStation Portable on October 18, 2012. Tokihiro Naito was the director for this version, and was chosen for his work on role-playing games such as Hydlide.

== Reception ==
Reception

Review score
Publication	Score	
Publication	DS	PSP
Famitsu	35/40	34/40 (9, 8, 8, 9)

The Nintendo DS version was the 7th best selling video game in Japan during its debut week, with 41,000 copies sold. Chunsoft's CEO, Koichi Nakamura, said that this was below expectations, something he attributed to scheduling issues, which had led to a lack of promotion for the game and the inability to create a pre-order bonus. The PlayStation Portable version debuted in 15th place on Media Create's weekly list of the twenty best selling video games in Japan, with 6,368 copies sold; on its second week, it had dropped off the chart. By the end of 2012, it was the 416th best selling video game in Japan, with a total of 18,028 copies sold.
