= Mystery Dungeon: Shiren the Wanderer =

1995 video game

- Super Famicom cover art
- Developer: Chunsoft
- Publishers: Chunsoft: Super Famicom; JP: Chunsoft; Nintendo DS; WW: Sega; iOS, Android; JP: Spike Chunsoft
- Director: Tadashi Fukuzawa
- Producer: Koichi Nakamura
- Designer: Shin-ichiro Tomie
- Programmer: Takenori Yamamori
- Artists: Kaoru Hasegawa; Fuyuhiko Koizumi
- Writer: Shin-ichiro Tomie
- Composer: Koichi Sugiyama
- Series: Shiren the Wanderer; Mystery Dungeon
- Platforms: Super Famicom; Nintendo DS iOS; Android
- Release: December 1, 1995: Super Famicom; JP: December 1, 1995 Nintendo DS; JP: December 14, 2006; NA: March 4, 2008; EU: March 31, 2008 iOS; JP: March 12, 2019 Android; JP: March 14, 2019
- Genres: Roguelike, role-playing
- Mode: Single-player

Mystery Dungeon: Shiren the Wanderer, originally released in Japan as Fushigi no Dungeon 2: Fūrai no Shiren, (Note: Japanese: 不思議のダンジョン2 風来(ふうらい)のシレン, Hepburn: Fushigi no Danjon 2 Fūrai no Shiren; lit. Mystery Dungeon 2: Shiren the Wanderer) is a roguelike video game developed and published by Chunsoft. It is the second entry in the Mystery Dungeon series, following 1993's Torneko no Daibōken. It was originally released for the Super Famicom in 1995 in Japan. Sega published a Nintendo DS remake (Note: Titled Mystery Dungeon: Shiren the Wanderer in English and Fushigi no Dungeon: Fūrai no Shiren DS (不思議のダンジョン 風来(ふうらい)のシレンDS, Fushigi no Danjon Fūrai no Shiren DS; lit. Mystery Dungeon: Shiren the Wanderer DS) in Japanese.) in 2006 in Japan and in 2008 internationally. The remake was later ported to iOS and Android and published by Spike Chunsoft in 2019.

The player takes the role of the rōnin Shiren, who travels through thirty areas on his way to the Land of the Golden Condor. The game is turn-based, with all enemies and characters in an area moving whenever the player performs an action, such as attacking or moving. If the player falls in battle, they lose all their progress and are forced to restart from the beginning of the game: to counter-act this, they can choose to store powerful items in warehouses, and pick them up again on further playthroughs; the Nintendo DS release also adds rescue quests, where a player can save other players who have fallen, allowing them to continue from where they left off.

The game was developed with the core concept of repeated play, with players having to improve their items through multiple playthroughs, and was seen as a way for the developers to more fully express the Mystery Dungeon series than had already been done in previous series games which are based pre-existing game worlds that Chunsoft cannot change. The game was released to mixed reviews upon release, with reviewers criticizing the high difficulty and visuals, but praising how the game creates deep gameplay experiences through simple core gameplay concepts. Later, some publications called Shiren the Wanderer among the best in its genre and platform.

== Gameplay ==
The player navigates grid-based areas and fights enemies.

Shiren the Wanderer is a roguelike game in which the player traverses thirty randomly generated grid-based, top-down areas – referred to as floors – in which they fight enemies and find items. The player can move in eight directions, attack with melee weapons and arrows, and use a wide range of items with different effects: for example, some heal the player, some fling away enemies, and some allow the player to swap positions with an enemy. The items are kept in the player's inventory, which only has a limited amount of space. For every step the player takes, their health regenerates, but their fullness counter also decreases; because of this, the player needs to carry food items with them, which also take up inventory space. The gameplay is turn-based: every time the player performs an action, such as moving, attacking, or using items, all enemies and characters in the area perform one action as well. In addition to the enemy characters, there are friendly characters, three of which can join the player's party and help them with things such as healing.

If the player's character falls in battle, they are forced to restart from the beginning, with all their items and experience points gone; to avoid this, the player can store items in warehouses found in towns they travel through. Because of this, the player makes long-term progress by upgrading powerful items at village blacksmiths and storing them in warehouses, while upgrading their character is more of a temporary improvement. In the Nintendo DS version of the game, the player can avoid having to start over by getting rescued by another player: this is done by giving the other player a rescue quest, either through a password or the Nintendo Wi-Fi Connection. When a player embarks on a rescue mission, they start from level 1 and have to reach the fallen character without stopping at towns on their way. If they succeed, the rescued player can proceed from where they left off, and keep their items and experience points.

After the player has finished the thirty floors that make up the main game, a fourth companion character and additional, optional dungeons become available. These dungeons are harder than the main game, but include highly powerful items as a reward for their completion. A puzzle-based dungeon called Fay's Puzzles is also available from the start, in the first town, hosting fifty puzzles about avoiding enemies, using items and moving carefully.

== Plot ==
The game takes place in a fantasy version of feudal Japan, and follows a rōnin named Shiren and his companion, the talking weasel Koppa, on a quest for the Land of the Golden Condor. They travel through forests, towns, mountains and caves, and are joined by three people they meet during the journey: Kechi the Masseur, a man who pretends to be blind; Oryu the Blinder, a travelling woman who has the power to blind people and monsters; and Pekeji, a man who claims to be Shiren's brother, separated at birth. Shiren eventually reaches the land, where he frees the golden condor from an ancient insect-like creature. He and Koppa ride away on the condor, flying across the towns he had passed, and the townspeople look up at the condor and make a wish. The condor lands, letting Shiren and Koppa jump off, before flying away. The game ends with Shiren and Koppa walking away into the night.

== Development ==
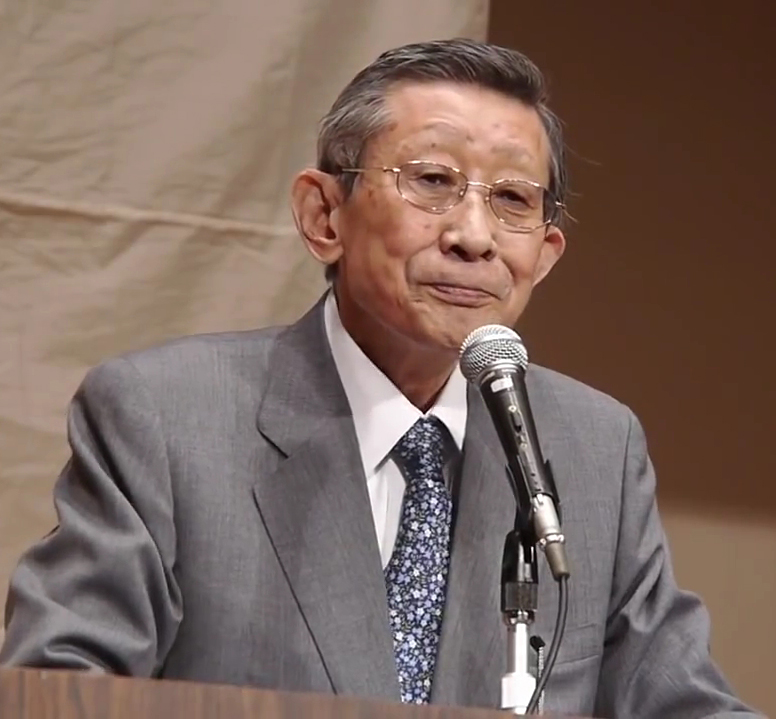
The music was composed by Koichi Sugiyama.

Shiren the Wanderer was developed by Chunsoft for the Super Famicom, with the core concept of repeated play, with the player improving their equipment and items each time they play, making progress through several playthroughs. The developers noted that Shiren the Wanderer differed from other Mystery Dungeon games in that the Chunsoft staff create characters themselves, allowing them to express the Mystery Dungeon series more fully than with the other games, which are set in already created worlds which Chunsoft cannot change. The game was developed in parallel with the Game Boy game Shiren the Wanderer GB, which used modified source code from the Super Famicom game.

In an interview talking about the Mystery Dungeon series in 2016, both Koichi Nakamura and Seiichiro Nagahata talked about the development of this game. The project was handled with one goal in mind: being different from the 1980 video game Rogue by making it easier to play for anyone, from changing the user interface to upgrade the gameplay while staying true to the roguelike genre. Content from the previous game, Torneko's Great Adventure: Mystery Dungeon, were recycled such as the semi-transparent map and unidentified items, while other content that were not featured from the aforementioned game were added, such as stores in dungeons and jars that let the player put and take off items inside. These jars were balanced so players can have additional spaces in their inventory, but also accidentally break them if they were caught by a trap, which drops the stored items from the broken jars to the floor. Like in the previous game, Nagahata used spreadsheets with Microsoft Excel for managing data of monsters and items in order to balance the game more efficiently.

The music was composed by Koichi Sugiyama, who made use of East Asian elements compared to his more European-styled Dragon Quest compositions, using instruments such as a shakuhachi flute. The scenario was written by Shin-ichiro Tomie and edited by Emiko Tanaka. In addition to the main story, Tomie wrote another scenario for the game, which the developers were unable to implement in the Super Famicom version. When creating the graphics, the development team faced challenges with the technical restrictions of the Super Famicom console: they were only able to use a limited number of colors, and were restricted to a 32×32 resolution for all graphics and actions. Later games in the series feature two programs – one for the story and one for dungeons – but the first Shiren the Wanderer only uses a dungeon program. This led to difficulties in portraying certain scenes, such as one where several townspeople are meant to appear, but the limitations of the dungeon program meant that only two non-player characters could be generated.

=== Nintendo DS version ===
The Nintendo DS version was directed by Hironori Ishigami and planned and supervised by Tomie, while Hiroyoshi Umetani was the main planner and in charge of game balance. Shin-ichiro Tomie created the scenario and events, Tanaka worked on the presentation and assisted with the scenario, and Masayasu Yamamoto programmed the dungeons. In addition to Sugiyama, the Nintendo DS version's music was worked on by Hayato Matsuo. The idea of developing a Nintendo DS version started when Chunsoft was considering creating a series of Mystery Dungeon games for the Nintendo DS. Previous Mystery Dungeon games came up in conversation: they considered doing something with the Game Boy games, but decided against it as it would have required them to redraw all the art, leaving them to decide between working on the Super Famicom or the Nintendo 64 games; they eventually settled on working on the Super Famicom title Shiren the Wanderer.

The idea of it being a simpler project due to the original art being reusable turned out to be untrue: because so much time had passed since the original's release, there were multiple parts that had to be reworked, leading to a process similar to creating a whole new game from scratch. All character graphics were redone, special effects were changed, and certain animations were added, such as sleeping animations. Some item placements were changed, the overall difficulty was adjusted, and some characters' battle statistics were altered; one such instance was making Kechi stronger than Oryu, due to it being perceived as illogical that a person with a sword would be weaker than a person fighting with her bare hands.

The unused scenario Tomie had written for the original version was included in the Nintendo DS version in the form of a bonus dungeon, playable after completion of the main game. It was altered slightly from the original plan due to technical restrictions: the scenario originally involved a nest with several large Tainted Insect enemies, but it was not possible to have so many large enemies appear at once. The developers considered using smaller Tainted Insects, but eventually decided to change the nest into a path with insects appearing every ten floors, and renamed the dungeon "The Tainted Path".

Ishigami played a large role in the implementation of the Wi-Fi rescue quests, and it went smoother than anticipated, something the developers attributed to their experience with developing mobile games. They were initially concerned about how the player loses all their items if they die during a rescue mission, but realized that it had to be that way to avoid people abusing rescue missions to get new items. Due to programming changes between the Japanese and the English versions of the game, rescue quests from the North American and European versions are only compatible with each other, and not with the Japanese release.

=== Smartphone version ===
The smartphone version was released first on iOS on March 12, 2019 and two days later on Android, both published by Spike Chunsoft. This version is a port based on the Nintendo DS remake.

== Release ==
The Super Famicom version of the game was originally released on December 1, 1995 by Chunsoft, and re-released through the Nintendo Power flash memory service on August 1, 2000. The re-release version was also ported to the Wii Virtual Console on July 24, 2007 exclusively in Japan. The Nintendo DS version was released by Sega on December 14, 2006 in Japan, and in March 2008 in Australia, North America and Europe; outside of an earlier fan translation, this was the first time the game was made available in English. The remake would receive a Bargain Edition later in Japan in August 2008. The Nintendo DS version was later published by Spike Chunsoft for iOS on March 12, 2019, and for Android two days later. A music album featuring arranged songs from the Super Famicom version and an orchestrated medley was published by Kitty Records on December 20, 1995.

Sega decided to localize the game due to them having a good relationship with Chunsoft, and wanting to "test the waters" for an American release of a Chunsoft game; they chose Shiren the Wanderer specifically because they felt it was a high-quality title that had been well adapted to the Nintendo DS platform. The localization was produced by Keith Dwyer at Sega, who said that, although there were some changes between the Japanese and the English versions to accommodate the change in language, they wanted the game to be fundamentally the same, as making it too different would lose the original's flavor. Dwyer noted that while some situations and words were difficult to recreate in English, the elements of Japanese culture present in the game were not a hindrance during the localization. The box art was changed for the localization, both to appeal to American players and to better communicate the tough journey the player goes on in the game.

== Reception ==
Reception

Aggregate score
Aggregator	Score
Metacritic	69/100

Review scores
Publication	Score
Famitsu	9/10, 9/10, 10/10, 10/10 (SFC); 34/40 (Nintendo DS)
GameSpot	6/10
GameSpy	4.5/5
IGN	6.5/10
RPGFan	87%

Shiren the Wanderer received "mixed or average reviews" upon release, according to the review aggregator Metacritic, but has later received more praise: in 2011, 1UP.com ranked it as the fifteenth best Nintendo DS game; in 2014, Hardcore Gamer called it "one of the finest roguelikes ever created"; and in 2016, IGN ranked it as the eighth best dungeon crawler of all time. Additionally, Gamasutra ranked it as the third best handheld game of the year in their "Best of 2008" list.

Several reviewers criticized the high difficulty and "permanent death" for being too much and making the game not accessible to players. Patrick Joynt of GameSpy saw this as both a positive and negative, calling it "punishingly, unrelentingly hardcore". He noted that the game uses simple core gameplay concepts to successfully create a "satisfyingly deep and responsive system" and depth in the combat encounters. RPGFan's Patrick Gann similarly enjoyed the game's depth, calling the gameplay concepts "nearly perfect". IGN's Jack DeVries, however, thought that the turn-based gameplay made combat feel too "stop-and-go", and said that he felt wary of trying certain risky things, such as attempting to steal from merchants, due to how punishing the game was. Meanwhile, Gann said that the knowledge that one would likely fall in battle eventually regardless of what happens made it possible to play the game without fear. Austin Shau at GameSpot liked the large variety of items for players to experiment with. Joynt and Famitsu enjoyed the game balance; the latter also appreciated the improved item storage system of the Nintendo DS version.

Shau enjoyed the game's presentation, praising the music and visuals, but wished that there had been a larger visual variety for the levels. Joynt, however, found the graphics unimpressive, while noting that they were unimportant compared to the gameplay. DeVries thought the animations were underwhelming for a Super Famicom game, noting situations such as lighting undead soldiers on fire as examples of when further visual spectacle would have added to the experience. Gann said that the graphics were "simple and functional" and, while improved in the Nintendo DS version, still had plenty of room for improvement; he also wished that there had been character art accompanying the dialogue boxes, and more cutscenes. He called the music and sound effects excellent, calling the sound impressive and fitting, causing him to start searching for all soundtrack releases from the Mystery Dungeon series.

Few video game developers liked the game since its release, most notably for its content that were new for a Super Famicom game. In Famistu Column #631, Masahiro Sakurai, of Kirby and Super Smash Bros. fame, contemplated for the permadeath gameplay of the genre while also never completing them for the same reason. He mentioned the infinite amount of time players can play the game, stating "there are a lot of random elements so each playthrough is a different experience". In a video from Sakurai's own YouTube channel, he also found the use of a translucent map interesting, stating it "won't work in every genre, but it was groundbreaking at the time."

=== Appearances in other games ===
The main protagonist of the eponymous series, Shiren, has appeared in numerous video games that were developed or published by Spike Chunsoft.

A costume based on him can be worn in the action-adventure sandbox game Terraria, though limited to a few hardware in Japan, in the Etrian Mystery Dungeon sub-series labeled as the Wanderer class, and in Katana Kami: A Way of the Samurai Story as a pre-order bonus. Shiren, along with Koppa, and with their design and side characters sourced from Shiren the Wanderer: The Tower of Fortune and the Dice of Fate, appear in Mystery Chronicle: One Way Heroics. Shiren, along with Asuka and her design sourced from Shiren the Wanderer Side Story: Swordswoman Asuka Arrives!, appear in RPG Maker MV, and as alternative costumes for Cadence in Crypt of the NecroDancer with characters from series developed by Spike Chunsoft such as Danganronpa and Kenka Bancho. Shiren alone appears in the defunct game Seikimatsu Days: Our Era's End, as a pre-registration character, and as a summoning card in a side game of AI: The Somnium Files – Nirvana Initiative.

In 428: Shibuya Scramble, a plush based on the recurrent monster, Mamel, can be seen in the background throughout numerous cutscenes from Tama's path. Likewise in its sequel anime adaptation, Canaan, some characters can be seen wearing hats based on various monsters from the Shiren the Wanderer series. The Mamel is also mentioned a few time in AI: The Somnium Files – Nirvana Initiative, including a moment where they refer the Pit Mamel as its Super Famicom fan translation's name, "Subterranean Mamul". In Danganronpa V3: Killing Harmony, a replica of this game is present as an unlockable bonus content, titled Despair Dungeon: Monokuma's Test. Monsters from the Shiren the Wanderer series would appear as a mix of their original design and Monokuma, the franchise's main antagonist, in this mini game. They appear later in 2021 along with more monsters in Danganronpa S: Ultimate Summer Camp, the enhanced version of the boardgame Ultimate Talent Development Plan from Danganronpa V3.
