= Shiren the Wanderer (2008 video game) =

- North American cover art
- Developer(s): Chunsoft
- Publisher(s): JP: Sega; NA: Atlus USA; Portable: JP: Spike
- Director(s): Satoshi Yoshida
- Producer(s): Toshinori Asai; Yasuhiko Sameshima
- Designer(s): Seiichiro Nagahata; Hiroyoshi Umetani; Shonosuke Morisue; Akio Yoshimoto
- Programmer(s): Masayasu Yamamoto
- Artist(s): Kaoru Hasegawa
- Writer(s): Masato Kato
- Composer(s): Hayato Matsuo
- Series: Shiren the Wanderer; Mystery Dungeon
- Platform(s): Wii, PlayStation Portable
- Release: Wii: JP: June 5, 2008; NA: February 9, 2010; PlayStation Portable: JP: January 28, 2010
- Genre(s): Role-playing, roguelike
- Mode(s): Single-player

Shiren the Wanderer (Note: Known in Japan as Fushigi no Dungeon: Fūrai no Shiren 3: Karakuri Yashiki no Nemuri Hime (Japanese: 不思議のダンジョン 風来(ふうらい)のシレン3 からくり屋敷の眠り姫, Hepburn: Fushigi no Danjon Fūrai no Shiren 3 Karakuri Yashiki no Nemuri Hime; lit. Mystery Dungeon: Shiren the Wanderer 3: The Sleeping Princess and the Karakuri Mansion).) is a roguelike video game developed by Chunsoft for the Wii. It was released in Japan on June 5, 2008, and in North America on February 9, 2010. It is the third main entry in the Shiren the Wanderer series, which itself is a part of the larger Mystery Dungeon series. A PlayStation Portable version (Note: Mystery Dungeon: Shiren the Wanderer 3 Portable, known in Japan as Fushigi no Dungeon: Fūrai no Shiren 3 Portable (Japanese: 不思議のダンジョン 風来(ふうらい)のシレン3 ポータブル, Hepburn: Fushigi no Danjon Fūrai no Shiren 3 Pōtaburu; lit. Mystery Dungeon: Shiren the Wanderer 3 Portable).) was released later in 2010, with a readjusted difficulty, a new infrastructure mode, and shorter loading times via the ability to install the game.

== Gameplay ==
Similar to Torneko's Great Adventure 3, the level is inherited in the main story, but like past games, dungeons starting from level 1 and high-difficulty dungeons after completing the main story are also available. There are more than 30 dungeons, new monsters and a new tool growth system. The player can choose between easy and normal difficulty levels to make it easier for newcomers of the genre to play. In the normal difficulty, should the player lose in a dungeon, they will lose all of their items. In contrary, they would not lose their items in the other difficulty.

== Plot ==
The game's plot happens one year after Shiren the Wanderer GB2: Magic Castle of the Desert. Shiren and his partner Koppa reunite with his uncle, Sensei, who then leads him to embark on a journey to solve the mystery of the legendary Karakuri Mansion.

== Development ==
Initially scheduled to be released on February 28, 2008, Shiren the Wanderer's initial Japanese release was delayed to June for quality assurance and bug fixes. In an interview article released by Atlus' business partner Sega, the game's developers stated that they would avoid making use of the Wii Remote's unique motion controls out of a concern that they would not be in line with the original, classic gameplay of prior installments. They thus came up with two control schemes that would heavily rely on analog sticks: a default one that uses the Wii Remote and Nunchuk and an alternate one that employs the Classic Controller, the latter which they recommended.

== Releases ==
The game was released on June 5, 2008, in Japan by Sega, then nearly two years later in North America on February 9, 2010, by Atlus USA. Its PlayStation Portable port was released solely in Japan on January 28, 2010. The latter version was republished as a downloadable game in the Japanese PlayStation Store on May 15, 2012, then once more on July 11, 2013 with the label "Spike Chunsoft the Best".

== Reception ==
Reception

Aggregate score
Aggregator	Score
Metacritic	71/100

Review scores
Publication	Score
1Up.com	8.3/10
Destructoid	7/10
Famitsu	35/40
GamePro	8/10
GameSpot	6.0/10
GameTrailers	7.3/10
GameZone	7.5/10
Hardcore Gamer	7.5/10
IGN	7.0/10
Nintendo Power	6.5/10
Nintendo World Report	7/10
RPGamer	1.5/5
RPGFan	91%

The Wii version of Shiren the Wanderer 3 received mixed or average reviews based on twenty-one critic reviews, according to review aggregator Metacritic. The game received a score of 35 of 40 from Famitsu magazine. It sold 59,000 units in its debut week in Japan.
