= List of Dragon Quest IV characters =

Enix's role-playing video game Dragon Quest IV (DQIV), features eight permanent player characters in the Nintendo Entertainment System version, and nine in the PlayStation and Nintendo DS versions. The chapter structure of DQIV results in a new set of characters being controlled in each chapter; it is not until the fifth chapter that the Hero becomes the controllable protagonist.

The cast was designed by Akira Toriyama, who served as art designer for the Dragon Quest series. In addition to the nine main characters, there are various helper characters who have temporary stints with the party and then leave after the plot advances. Many non-player characters populate the world of DQIV as well. Most notably, the protagonists are out to stop the villainous Psaro, who plans to get revenge on humanity by resurrecting the Ruler of Evil.

== Main characters ==
=== Hero ===
The Hero is the protagonist of the game, and can be male or female. More unique differences were planned for the male and female Heroes due to demand from Dragon Quest III players, but this was neglected after creator Yuji Horii forgot. In the original version on Nintendo Entertainment System, they could be named at the beginning, but did not appear until Chapter 5. In later versions, a prologue is added that has the player controlling them briefly before Chapter 1. They later appear in Chapter 5 as the starring character. In this chapter, Psaro's army destroys the village in the pursuit of the Hero, killing everyone except the Hero, including their friend Eliza who disguises herself as the Hero to keep the Hero safe. They venture out into the world, gathering various allies in their quest to defeat Psaro.

=== Ragnar McRyan ===
Ragnar McRyan (Ragnar in the NES version) is the first playable character in the NES version of Dragon Quest IV. He is sent by his king to investigate the disappearance of children from a nearby village, allying with a Cureslime named Healie along the way. He discovers that a demon has been kidnapping children to kill them as an attempt to potentially kill the chosen one. Ragnar kills this demon and rescues the remaining children before being sent to track down the Hero in order to assist him in his quest to defeat Psaro.

=== Alena ===
Alena is a princess and the star of the second chapter. She sneaks out, accompanied by her retainers Kiryl and Borya, in order to go on an adventure and become a warrior despite her father's wishes. She eventually enters an arena and participates as a fighter, winning by default after another combatant, Psaro, fails to show. Upon returning to the castle, she finds that the castle is empty, going with Kiryl and Borya to discover the truth of the occupants' absence. She eventually joins with the Hero after they help her and Borya heal Kiryl from a fever, assisting them in defeating Psaro.

=== Kiryl and Borya ===
Kiryl and Borya are two of Alena's retainers who accompany her on her quest to explore the world. They believe that she would not obey her father and remain behind, and thus would be safer if they went with her. In Chapter 5, Kiryl becomes deathly ill, forcing Alena to search for a cure. Once the cure is found, Kiryl accompanies Alena and Borya in joining the Hero in their quest to defeat Psaro.

Kiryl's AI was commonly criticized for using ineffective spells in battle, such as spells that are meant to cause instant death, even if the spells could not possibly work. Excite writer Bergman Tagata noted that this quirk about Kiryl was annoying due also to his propensity to use it on weaker enemies as well, stating that this occurs because the AI does not have information about the enemy, and only learns after fighting them. Because boss characters are fought only once, he explained that Kiryl doesn't have any opportunity to put that knowledge to use.

=== Torneko ===
Torneko is a merchant, and the star of the third chapter. He does not have strong fighting capabilities, and his story involves him establishing his own business. Along the way, he helps create a bridge and a tunnel, as well as avert a war between two kingdoms. He eventually joins the Hero in their quest to defeat Psaro. Torneko went on to star in multiple spin-off titles, including as part of the Mystery Dungeon spin-off Torneko's Great Adventure.

=== Maya and Meena ===
Maya and Meena are sisters, a dancer and fortune teller respectively, who serve as the lead characters for the fourth chapter. They are investigating the murder of their father, eventually discovering that he was researching something called the Secret of Evolution, and was killed for it by his apprentice Balzack. They eventually join the Hero, killing Balzack and assisting the Hero in defeating Psaro.

== Antagonists ==
=== Psaro ===
Psaro is the main antagonist of the story, with his goal being to get revenge on humankind for perceived atrocities, including the abuse of his love, Rose, an elf whose tears are made of ruby. He and his minions kidnap and kill children in order to prevent the rise of the Legendary Hero, though the true Hero ends up surviving the attack on their village. As part of his plan, he is also seeking to master the Secret of Evolution, which would give him incredible power. Following the assassination of Rose, orchestrated by Aamon, he goes mad, turning into a monster and becoming defeated by the hero. In later versions of the game, Rose can be revived, allowing the player to spare him, at which point he joins the party in killing Aamon.

=== Aamon ===
Aamon (Dragon Warrior IV: Radimvice) is a minion of Psaro's, one who manipulates Psaro into doing things to serve his own ends. Aamon eventually helps cause the death of Rose, Psaro's love, which results in Psaro losing control and going on a rampage, allowing Aamon to take over as leader of the monsters. He becomes the main antagonist after defeating Psaro in the Nintendo DS version of Dragon Quest IV after Rose is revived and Psaro is pacified.

== Other appearances ==
Various characters in Dragon Quest IV make appearances in other games in different capacities. In Dragon Quest Heroes: The World Tree's Woe and the Blight Below and Dragon Quest Heroes II features multiple characters as playable characters, as does Dragon Quest Tact, Dragon Quest Walk, and the Itadaki Street series.

A manga anthology titled Dragon Quest 4 Panel Manga Theater was created, featuring the cast of Dragon Quest IV. Multiple manga authors contributed to the anthology, including Ami Shibata and Hiroyuki Eto.

== Concept and creation ==
The main cast of Dragon Quest IV comprises different characters from different walks of life, all of whom eventually coalesce around the protagonist and their quest to save the world. Each of the five chapters has its own set of characters and quest. The character designs were created by artist Akira Toriyama. Following the success of Dragon Quest III, the creator of Dragon Quest IV, Yuji Horii, wanted to make a distinct game from III rather than retread it too directly since he expected many people would begin the series with IV. In III, players obtain a full party at the beginning of the game. Horii varied the formula by splitting the game into chapters and having the chapters be separate quests, wanting players to experience each character's story before searching for their party members. He also intended on surprising players, introducing the characters Maya and Meena to the Hero when they are searching for the other characters first instead of Ragnar McRyan, who was the first character you played as.

In the NES version of the game, the lead character was controlled directly by the player, while other characters were controlled by artificial intelligence. It was initially considered giving each character AI that matches their in-game personality, but it was felt that it would not be satisfying. They also considered allowing monsters to join the party, but decided against it, viewing the AI system as adequate. Later versions of Dragon Quest IV allowed most characters to be controlled directly. In the English localization of the Nintendo DS version of Dragon Quest IV, various characters were given different accents. The first chapter gives characters Scottish accents, the second gives them Russian accents, and the fourth gives them French accents. This is unlike the Japanese versions of the different versions, where everyone has a standard Japanese accent. The English localization team for the DS version aimed to give the characters names that evoked the original English names for some characters while including the original names; this resulted in names such as Ragnar McRyan, which combined the English localization "Ragnar" and Japanese name "Ryan."

== Reception ==
Dragon Quest IV has been noted as a pioneering game in character-based role-playing games. Eurogamer writer Simon Parkin enjoyed the conceit of the game having different starring characters in each chapter, particularly due to how much it diversifies the cast. Hardcore Gamer writer Chris Shive similarly enjoyed this structure, believing it successfully made players care about the whole cast.

The AI controlling the non-main characters of each chapter in the Nintendo Entertainment System version of the game has received negative reception, with Chris Shive commenting that the best improvement in the Nintendo DS version was allowing the player to control them directly. This AI design has led to issues with the AI, particularly the character Kiryl using the instant-death spell Whack on enemies immune to it, which gave him a reputation of being a stupid character. Automaton writer Takumi Nango praised the use of non-English accents in the English version of the Nintendo DS version, feeling that it was tastefully done. They praised the detail that the localization team put in, particularly how they made dogs' bark match their region as well, suggesting that they did a lot of research into the different dialects. They believed that the motivation to include different dialects was out of a desire to reflect how the main cast all hail from diverse regions, social classes, and occupations.
