= List of Super Smash Bros. series characters =

A mural featuring the fighters in Super Smash Bros. Ultimate, which includes every playable character in the series

The fighting game series Super Smash Bros. from Nintendo, launched in 1999, features an assortment of video game characters from 40 different franchises. There are 89 playable characters across the series, mostly sourced from Nintendo franchises but with a number of third-party ones as well. There are also other non-player characters that take the form of enemies, bosses, and power-ups.

== Playable characters ==
Each game in the series has a number of playable characters, referred to as "fighters", that are taken primarily from Nintendo franchises. There are 89 total fighters across the series. Starting with Super Smash Bros. Brawl, characters from non-Nintendo franchises began to make playable appearances. Each character has multiple alternate costumes; some, such as Villager, have both male and female versions. Each game has multiple unlockable characters that can only be used if certain conditions are fulfilled.

All games have featured fighters that largely share their moves and abilities with another fighter on the roster, but with minor differences in their presentation and gameplay. In Super Smash Bros. Melee, all of these characters, known as "model swap characters" according to the Japanese website, were unlockable, but were distinguished from other unlockable characters in that their portrait was added next to the character they were based on instead of filling in one of the placeholder slots at the bottom of the select screen. In Ultimate, several of these characters were officially labeled as "Echo Fighters". They have an option either to be displayed next to or within the character portrait from which they are based on.

Fighter	N64	Melee	Brawl	for 3DS/Wii U	Ultimate	Franchise
Banjo & Kazooie	No	No	No	No	DLC	Banjo-Kazooie
Bayonetta	No	No	No	DLC	Yes	Bayonetta
Bowser	No	Yes	Yes	Yes	Yes	Mario
Bowser Jr. (Note: Bowser Jr.'s alternate costumes change the character's name and appearance to be one of the Koopalings: Larry, Roy, Wendy, Iggy, Morton, Lemmy, or Ludwig.)	No	No	No	Yes	Yes	Mario
Byleth (Note: Both male and female variants are playable.)	No	No	No	No	DLC	Fire Emblem
Captain Falcon	Yes	Yes	Yes	Yes	Yes	F-Zero
Charizard (Note: In Brawl and Ultimate, Squirtle, Ivysaur, and Charizard are listed together under the name "Pokémon Trainer" on the character select screen. The Pokémon Trainer appears in the background while the player takes direct control of one of the Pokémon, and can switch between them during the battle. In 3DS/Wii U, only Charizard is available as a standalone character.)	No	No	Yes	Yes	Yes	Pokémon
Chrom (Note: In Ultimate, this character is classified as an Echo Fighter.)	No	No	No	No	Yes	Fire Emblem
Cloud	No	No	No	DLC	Yes	Final Fantasy
Corrin	No	No	No	DLC	Yes	Fire Emblem
Daisy	No	No	No	No	Yes	Mario
Dark Pit	No	No	No	Yes	Yes	Kid Icarus
Dark Samus	No	No	No	No	Yes	Metroid
Diddy Kong	No	No	Yes	Yes	Yes	Donkey Kong
Donkey Kong	Yes	Yes	Yes	Yes	Yes	Donkey Kong
Dr. Mario (Note: In Melee, this character is considered a model swap character.)	No	Yes	No	Yes	Yes	Mario
Duck Hunt (Note: There are slight name variations between NTSC and PAL versions. The NTSC characters "Duck Hunt" and "Mii Swordfighter" are referred to in PAL versions as "Duck Hunt Duo" and "Mii Sword Fighter.")	No	No	No	Yes	Yes	Duck Hunt
Falco	No	Yes	Yes	Yes	Yes	Star Fox
Fox	Yes	Yes	Yes	Yes	Yes	Star Fox
Ganondorf	No	Yes	Yes	Yes	Yes	The Legend of Zelda
Greninja	No	No	No	Yes	Yes	Pokémon
Hero (Note: Despite the name referring to a single character, the Hero represents four different protagonists from the Dragon Quest series. His default appearance is the Luminary/Eleven from Dragon Quest XI, with Erdrick/Arusu from Dragon Quest III, Solo from Dragon Quest IV, and Eight from Dragon Quest VIII appearing as alternate costumes.)	No	No	No	No	DLC	Dragon Quest
Ice Climbers	No	Yes	Yes	No	Yes	Ice Climber
Ike	No	No	Yes	Yes	Yes	Fire Emblem
Incineroar	No	No	No	No	Yes	Pokémon
Inkling	No	No	No	No	Yes	Splatoon
Isabelle	No	No	No	No	Yes	Animal Crossing
Ivysaur	No	No	Yes	No	Yes	Pokémon
Jigglypuff	Yes	Yes	Yes	Yes	Yes	Pokémon
Joker	No	No	No	No	DLC	Persona
Kazuya	No	No	No	No	DLC	Tekken
Ken	No	No	No	No	Yes	Street Fighter
King Dedede	No	No	Yes	Yes	Yes	Kirby
King K. Rool	No	No	No	No	Yes	Donkey Kong
Kirby	Yes	Yes	Yes	Yes	Yes	Kirby
Link	Yes	Yes	Yes	Yes	Yes	The Legend of Zelda
Little Mac	No	No	No	Yes	Yes	Punch-Out!!
Lucario	No	No	Yes	Yes	Yes	Pokémon
Lucas	No	No	Yes	DLC	Yes	Mother/EarthBound
Lucina	No	No	No	Yes	Yes	Fire Emblem
Luigi	Yes	Yes	Yes	Yes	Yes	Mario
Mario	Yes	Yes	Yes	Yes	Yes	Mario
Marth	No	Yes	Yes	Yes	Yes	Fire Emblem
Mega Man	No	No	No	Yes	Yes	Mega Man
Meta Knight	No	No	Yes	Yes	Yes	Kirby
Mewtwo	No	Yes	No	DLC	Yes	Pokémon
Mii Brawler (Note: In 3DS/Wii U, Mii Brawler, Mii Swordfighter, and Mii Gunner are under one character slot labeled simply as "Mii". In Ultimate, they were separated into their own individual slots. However, stacking Echo Fighters also stacks the three Mii Fighters as they were in 3DS/Wii U.)	No	No	No	Yes	Yes	Mii
Mii Gunner	No	No	No	Yes	Yes	Mii
Mii Swordfighter	No	No	No	Yes	Yes	Mii
Min Min	No	No	No	No	DLC	Arms
Mr. Game & Watch	No	Yes	Yes	Yes	Yes	Game & Watch
Mythra (Note: Pyra and Mythra share a slot on the character select screen; players can freely switch between the two during battle.)	No	No	No	No	DLC	Xenoblade
Ness	Yes	Yes	Yes	Yes	Yes	Mother/EarthBound
Olimar (Note: In 3DS/Wii U and Ultimate, half of Olimar's alternate costumes change his name and appearance to Alph, a character from Pikmin 3.)	No	No	Yes	Yes	Yes	Pikmin
Pac-Man	No	No	No	Yes	Yes	Pac-Man
Palutena	No	No	No	Yes	Yes	Kid Icarus
Peach	No	Yes	Yes	Yes	Yes	Mario
Pichu	No	Yes	No	No	Yes	Pokémon
Pikachu	Yes	Yes	Yes	Yes	Yes	Pokémon
Piranha Plant	No	No	No	No	DLC	Mario
Pit	No	No	Yes	Yes	Yes	Kid Icarus
Pyra	No	No	No	No	DLC	Xenoblade
Richter	No	No	No	No	Yes	Castlevania
Ridley	No	No	No	No	Yes	Metroid
R.O.B.	No	No	Yes	Yes	Yes	R.O.B.
Robin	No	No	No	Yes	Yes	Fire Emblem
Rosalina & Luma	No	No	No	Yes	Yes	Mario
Roy	No	Yes	No	DLC	Yes	Fire Emblem
Ryu	No	No	No	DLC	Yes	Street Fighter
Samus (Note: In Brawl, Zero Suit Samus is an alternate form of Samus not displayed on the character select screen; players can switch back and forth between the two by using a specific attack. The two were separated and became independent characters beginning in 3DS/Wii U.)	Yes	Yes	Yes	Yes	Yes	Metroid
Sephiroth	No	No	No	No	DLC	Final Fantasy
Sheik (Note: In Melee and Brawl, Sheik is an alternate form of Zelda not displayed on the character select screen; players can switch back and forth between the two by using a specific attack. The two were separated and became independent characters beginning in 3DS/Wii U.)	No	Yes	Yes	Yes	Yes	The Legend of Zelda
Shulk	No	No	No	Yes	Yes	Xenoblade
Simon	No	No	No	No	Yes	Castlevania
Snake	No	No	Yes	No	Yes	Metal Gear
Sonic	No	No	Yes	Yes	Yes	Sonic the Hedgehog
Sora	No	No	No	No	DLC	Kingdom Hearts
Squirtle	No	No	Yes	No	Yes	Pokémon
Steve (Note: Steve's alternate costumes change the character's name and appearance to Alex, a Zombie, or an Enderman.)	No	No	No	No	DLC	Minecraft
Terry	No	No	No	No	DLC	Fatal Fury
Toon Link	No	No	Yes	Yes	Yes	The Legend of Zelda
Villager	No	No	No	Yes	Yes	Animal Crossing
Wario	No	No	Yes	Yes	Yes	Wario
Wii Fit Trainer	No	No	No	Yes	Yes	Wii Fit
Wolf	No	No	Yes	No	Yes	Star Fox
Yoshi	Yes	Yes	Yes	Yes	Yes	Yoshi
Young Link	No	Yes	No	No	Yes	The Legend of Zelda
Zelda	No	Yes	Yes	Yes	Yes	The Legend of Zelda
Zero Suit Samus	No	No	Yes	Yes	Yes	Metroid
Total	12	26	39	51 (+7 DLC)	76 (+13 DLC)	40 different franchises

=== Roster development ===
Originally designed as a prototype using only original characters, a second prototype was later developed featuring a roster of Mario, Donkey Kong, Samus, and Fox. Other ideas that were considered included making the roster entirely of Kirby characters or dogs. Sakurai remarked that part of his aim when creating the game was to ensure that the characters were handled appropriately. He found Pokémon characters the hardest to get permission for due to how their image is "tightly supervised." According to Sakurai, some people within Nintendo were concerned about the optics of the game, particularly the idea of Mario attacking Pikachu.

Each Super Smash Bros. game features multiple characters who were initially considered for playable inclusion, but were either decided against or omitted due to limited development resources. Some of these characters were later added in subsequent entries; for example, Bowser and King Dedede were originally planned for the roster of the first game, but did not get added to the series until Melee and Brawl respectively. During development of Melee, multiple characters were considered for inclusion but ultimately turned down. During development, Sakurai wanted to include a character from a classic Nintendo game, including the protagonists of Balloon Fight, Excitebike, Clu Clu Land, and Urban Champion, before settling on Ice Climbers. Ayumi Tachibana from the Famicom Detective Club series was also considered, but was not included due to her lack of presence among international audiences. Marth and Roy were both considered to be removed from international versions of Melee. Marth was originally included due to Sakurai's desire to include more sword users, specifically so Link would be able to "cross blades" with someone else. He also campaigned to include Roy, whose game would not be released until after Melee. Sakurai stated that having characters speak Japanese in English releases was rare at the time, and that there was more dispute over Roy. He ultimately succeeded in convincing them to remain in international versions. Lucas was considered for Melee as a replacement for Ness, but he was kept out of the roster due to the cancellation of the Nintendo 64 version of Mother 3. Third-party characters, including Solid Snake and Sonic the Hedgehog, were considered as well. Snake's creator, Hideo Kojima, requested the character's inclusion for Melee, but the game was too late in development. Time restraints similarly affected Sonic's inclusion according to Yuji Naka. Wario was also considered, with Sakurai stating that he would have included him if he had more development time.

Super Smash Bros. for Nintendo 3DS and Wii U introduced the ability for players to create their own Mii Fighters, which use customizable moves from one of three different fighting styles (Brawler, Swordfighter and Gunner). These Miis can be further customized with costume pieces unlocked through gameplay or purchased as downloadable content. Several of these costumes are based on characters and franchises not otherwise represented, such as Sans from Undertale, Shantae from the eponymous series, and Doom Slayer from Doom. According to Sakurai, the addition of Miis and Mii costumes was made to allow players to simulate playing as characters that would not otherwise be included in the game.

Following the release of Super Smash Bros. for Nintendo 3DS and Wii U, an open ballot was held to allow fans to submit their requests for new character inclusions. These votes would go on to influence the roster of Super Smash Bros. Ultimate, with several characters being added as a direct result of their popularity in the fan ballot.

According to Daniel Kaplan, a former business developer for Mojang, discussion about Steve's inclusion began in 2015. Sakurai stated that a Nintendo employee asked at one point about the prospect of including Minecraft in Super Smash Bros. Ultimate, at which point he agreed.

=== Competitive use ===
Sakurai remarked that it was difficult to balance Super Smash Bros. for Nintendo 64 due to certain characters being better in four-player matches and others being better in one-on-one matches. He also stated that he heard from tournament players that Kirby and Ness were too strong. He agreed about Ness, and one of Ness' attacks was nerfed in overseas versions to make it weaker.

In competitive Melee, the top characters among the roster tended to include Fox, Sheik, Falco, Jigglypuff, Captain Falcon, Ice Climbers, Peach, and Marth. Yoshi, considered one of the worst fighters in Super Smash Bros. Melee, was used by competitive Melee player aMSa to win the first "super-major tournament" with a Yoshi ever. Donkey Kong, another low tier, was also able to perform better. This, combined with other low-tier picks, inspired other players to use characters like Yoshi and Donkey Kong in competitive play. It has also led to players reconsidering Yoshi and Donkey Kong's placement in the tier list, with competitive Melee player Hungrybox considering Yoshi among the best of the characters.

Some tournaments have banned characters from competitive use in the past due to being particularly imbalanced, such as Meta Knight in Brawl and Steve and Kazuya in Ultimate.

== Non-playable characters ==
In addition to the roster of playable fighters, several non-playable characters appear, some of which were created for the Super Smash Bros. series. These can take the form of bosses, summonable characters, enemies, and other minor appearances.

=== Original characters ===
Master Hand is a glove-like being that appears in all games to date, frequently serving as the final boss of the games' single player modes. In Melee, Master Hand is playable via a system glitch. He is also briefly playable in Ultimate's Adventure Mode if certain requirements are met. Super Smash Bros. Melee introduces a left-hand counterpart to Master Hand named Crazy Hand, who appears alongside him in all subsequent games under certain conditions. Super Smash Bros. for Nintendo 3DS and Wii U features a new form, Master Core, a mass of black particles that emerge from Master Hand and Crazy Hand after their defeat and shapeshift into multiple forms. Master Hand and Crazy Hand share a voice with each game's announcer, who provides commentary over the game's menus and battles and frequently narrates promotional videos for the series.

Tabuu is the primary antagonist and final boss of Super Smash Bros. Brawl's story mode, "The Subspace Emissary". He is the humanoid embodiment of Subspace, a void-like alternate dimension, and seeks to consume the world. He takes possession of Master Hand to manipulate others into doing his bidding, with his Subspace Army forces pulling parts of the world into Subspace at his behest. Though he is temporarily able to turn all the fighters into trophies using his "off waves" attack, he is weakened by the sudden arrival of Sonic the Hedgehog, and the revived fighters destroy him, restoring the world to normal.

Super Smash Bros. Ultimate's story mode, "World of Light", introduces Galeem, an evil entity described as the "Lord of Light". Aided by an army of Master Hand puppets, he destroys the Smash Bros. world and captures the spirits of the world's inhabitants, placing them under his control. Only Kirby is able to escape, exploring Galeem's recreated world to free the other fighters and restore the captured spirits to normal. After Galeem is defeated, its dark counterpart Dharkon emerges, and it uses its Crazy Hand puppets to take control of the remaining spirits, attempting to consume the world in darkness. Upon Dharkon's defeat, it and Galeem escape to a new world, with their forces waging war against one another. Defeating only Galeem or Dharkon individually will result in an ending in which the survivor consumes the universe. However, by defeating an equal amount of light and dark Spirits on the final map, players are able to challenge and destroy both of them, freeing the Spirits from their control.

=== Others ===
Villains from different game franchises have appeared as bosses in the games' single player modes, such as Pokémon's Rayquaza and Castlevania's Dracula. One boss, a more powerful form of Bowser known as Giga Bowser, was created for Super Smash Bros. Melee and has alternately featured throughout the series as a boss and playable character via Bowser's Final Smash attack. Other bosses appear on individual stages to disrupt battles, such as Mega Man's Yellow Devil.

Certain items in the Super Smash Bros. series can be used to temporarily summon other characters to assist the player or disrupt the battle. These include the Poké Ball, introduced in the original Super Smash Bros., which can be thrown to call forth a random Pokémon; and the Assist Trophy, added in Brawl, which summons a character from one of various gaming franchises, such as Super Mario's Waluigi, Star Fox's Andross, and the eponymous character of Shovel Knight. Some Assist Trophies, such as Little Mac and Isabelle, have gone on to appear as playable fighters in later installments.

Each game includes a group of generic enemy characters fought in large groups in the games' single-player campaigns and "Multi-Man Smash" minigames, known as the "Mysterious Small Fry Enemy Corps" (謎のザコ敵軍団) in Japanese. In English, they are given names that describe their physical form in each game: the Fighting Polygon Team in Super Smash Bros., the Fighting Wire Frames in Melee, the Fighting Alloy Team in Brawl, and the Fighting Mii Team in for Nintendo 3DS/Wii U and Ultimate. Minor enemies from other games also appear as opponents in certain modes throughout the series, including Adventure Mode in Melee and Smash Run in Nintendo 3DS. Other characters appear in non-interactive forms that do not affect gameplay, such as collectible trophies depicting their likeness or as spectators watching a battle on specific stages.
