= Hero (Dragon Quest III) =

Dragon Quest III protagonist

- Dragon Quest character
- Art of the male and female Hero in Dragon Quest III
- First game: Dragon Quest III (1988)
- Created by: Yuji Horii
- Designed by: Akira Toriyama
- Voiced by: Nobuyuki Hiyama (male); Yuko Minaguchi (female)

The Hero, also known as Loto (ロト, Roto) in Japanese and Erdrick in English, is the protagonist of the 1988 video game Dragon Quest III. Unlike previous Dragon Quest protagonists, this Hero can be male or female, though fans criticized the lack of differences between the two gender options. They are the child of Ortega, who went missing after seeking out the villain Baramos. The Hero assumes this quest on their 16th birthday. The male Hero appears in Super Smash Bros. Ultimate as a playable character as part of a character called "Hero", alongside the heroes of Dragon Quest IV, Dragon Quest VIII, and Dragon Quest XI. They are a silent protagonist save for one line, which was not well received by fans. The lack of differences between the male and female Hero received criticism as well, leading to efforts to improve this in Dragon Quest IV. The Hero has been identified as an iconic Hero, with multiple critics identifying their design as a foundational one, citing the protagonist of the light novel Maoyu as an example.

== Appearances ==
The Hero appears in Dragon Quest III as its protagonist, able to be male or female. They were raised by their mother, and their father, Ortega, was missing after leaving after the Hero's birth to kill the villain Baramos. On their 16th birthday, the Hero sets out to defeat Baramos in their father's place. They have the character class of Hero, and is the only character who can have this class. They can be accompanied by up to three partner characters, each who can be one of multiple different classes. The Hero learns that Ortega reportedly fell into a volcano, but the Hero found him fighting right before his death in battle. After killing Baramos, the Hero learns that Baramos was a minion of the true villain, Zoma. After defeating Zoma, the Hero is depicted having disappeared, leaving behind their equipment, which appears in Dragon Quest and its sequel, Dragon Quest II. After this, the Hero is granted the title of Erdrick, a legendary figure in I and II. A reference to them was included in the English release of the first Final Fantasy, where a tombstone reads "Here lies Erdrick." This was changed from Link.

In a data mine of Super Smash Bros. Ultimate, a file for a character codenamed "Brave" was found, leading to speculation that a Dragon Quest Hero may be included as a playable character, with the Dragon Quest III Hero being the most popular suggestion. The rationale was that the Hero was called "Yuusha" in Japanese, which translates directly to Brave. A leak also reported that the Dragon Quest III Hero would appear as a playable character in Ultimate. The male Hero of Dragon Quest III was eventually revealed for Ultimate alongside the Dragon Quest IV male Hero and Dragon Quest VIII and Dragon Quest XI heroes as one character. They are all able to use various Dragon Quest spells as well as their respective sword and shield. The lack of a female Hero in Ultimate was speculated to be due to the belief that Square Enix was reluctant to use player characters in games like Dragon Quest Heroes. The male Hero is also featured in Dragon Quest Tact.

The male Hero stars in an arena show called "Dragon Quest Live Spectacle Tour," featuring other characters from the series, such as Alena from Dragon Quest IV, Terry from Dragon Quest VI, and Yangus from Dragon Quest VIII. They are portrayed by Matsuura Tsukasa in this.

== Concept and creation ==
The Hero of Dragon Quest III was designed by Akira Toriyama and created by series creator Yuji Horii. They are called Loto in Japanese, but were called Erdrick in the original Nintendo Entertainment System release of the Dragon Quest trilogy. The Loto name was used in the English Game Boy Color releases of the trilogy, though Square Enix began using the name Erdrick in English later. Horii designed the protagonist to be silent due to his desire for players to be able to put themselves in the main character's shoes. He made one exception in a scene where the Hero tells some characters to flee due to having difficulty finding a different way to do it, remarking that players didn't like it when they talked out of nowhere. Where the Hero of Dragon Quest I and II are both male, this Hero has the ability to be male or female. Despite allowing the Hero to be female, dialogue in the original release had characters refer to her as a boy. This was changed in the Super Famicom and Game Boy Color versions of the game. The game has no gameplay differences between male and female characters. Criticism from players about a lack of differences between male and female Hero led series creator Yuji Horii to aim to do better with gender differences for the Dragon Quest IV Hero, though he stated he only remembered this intention halfway through the game's development. Where the female Hero in Dragon Quest III was largely indistinguishable from the male Hero, the female Dragon Quest IV could be told apart based on the visuals. Beginning in the Super Famicom version of Dragon Quest III, the player is given a personality test to determine the kind of personality the Hero has. In Dragon Quest III HD-2D Remake, the male Hero is voiced by Nobuyuki Hiyama and the female Hero by Yuko Minaguchi.

== Reception ==
The Hero has received positive reception. In particular, they have been identified as a noteworthy example of a hero, with Magmix writer Luis Field saying that people think of this Hero when they think of heroes and that the male Hero's design is an iconic hero design. Anime News Network writer Jean-Karlo Lemus felt that the Hero in Dragon Quest III was a foundational character design, being the basis for hero designs in video games and light novels, arguing that the protagonist of the light novel Maoyu took from the Hero's design. Game*Spark writer Rate-Dat believed that, despite the concept of a hero predating Dragon Quest III, it was the Hero and Zoma who were responsible for the popularization of the hero versus demon lord motif in Japan. Magmix writer Katano felt similarly about the ubiquity of the Hero's circlet, stating that it has been a part of the image of a hero for years. They argued that the blue bead in the circlet and on the designs of their allies contrasted the red beads worn by villains like Zoma and Baramos. Katano argued that the modern image of a hero began with the Dragon Quest series, believing that Dragon Quest III and its Hero were decisive in creating that image.

USgamer writer Nadia Oxford appreciated the ability to play as a female Hero in Dragon Quest III, while Gen Gamachi of Inside Games felt that the ability to choose the Hero's gender contributed to enhancing the freedom of the game. Siliconera writer Jenni Lada felt that the ability to choose your gender helped set Dragon Quest III apart and created a trend that appeared in future Dragon Quest games. Futabanet writer Yamaguchi Quest expressed a desire for the remake of Dragon Quest III to allow the Hero to have a happier ending with his mother and father surviving to the end. 4gamer writer Kenichi Maeyamada also found this ending sad, particularly that Ortega died without being able to see his child and that the Hero could not return to their world.
