= Healie =

Dragon Quest IV character

- Dragon Quest character
- Healie in Dragon Quest IV
- First game: Dragon Quest IV (1990)
- Designed by: Akira Toriyama
- Portrayed by: Kanna Hashimoto
- Voiced by: Japanese: Marika Kōno; English: Oliver McKinnon-Wardell

In-universe information
- Race: Healslime
- Gender: Male

Healie, also known as Hoimin (Japanese: ホイミン), is a character in the 1990 video game Dragon Quest IV. He is a Healslime, a variant of the Slime monster from the series, who aspires to become a human, joining the warrior Ragnar McRyan in his quest to rescue kidnapped children from minions of Psaro. In promotional media for the franchise, he has been portrayed by Kanna Hashimoto.

The Healslime design was created by Akira Toriyama for Dragon Quest II, and was used for Healie in Dragon Quest IV and other titles. Due to his popularity with fans, Horii elected to expand upon the idea of having monsters as companions, adding it as a game mechanic to the sequel, Dragon Quest V. He has since appeared in other Dragon Quest games, including Dragon Quest Monsters: The Dark Prince, where he is seen in a human form.

He has been among the more popular companions and monsters in the Dragon Quest series, praised by critics for being cute and a reliable partner to Ragnar and cited as an example of moe aesthetic in gaming. Additional praise has been given for how well he helps illustrate the mechanics of Dragon Quest IV due to his role as an AI-controlled support character.

== Appearances ==
Healie appears in Dragon Quest IV as a companion to the main character of the first chapter, Ragnar McRyan, being the first companion in the Dragon Quest series. While Ragnar is controlled by the player in this chapter, Healie's actions are controlled by AI. Ragnar first meets Healie in a dungeon, where he professes his desire to become a human. Ragnar allows Healie to join his party, and the two work to rescue the kidnapped children from the minions of Psaro. Over the course of the next 10 years in the game's story, Ragnar and Healie travel together, though at some point they become separated, and Healie manages to turn into a human before being encountered by the game's Hero on the Hero's quest to defeat Psaro. Healie appears in the audio CD version of Dragon Quest IV, played by voice actor Mayumi Tanaka. He later appears in Dragon Quest Monsters: The Dark Prince, a game starring a younger Psaro, in a human form.

Healie appears in various mobile game titles in the Dragon Quest series in various capacities. In promotional media for the franchise, Healie is featured alongside the character Dragonlord in a live-action commercial for Dragon Quest Monsters: Super Light, where he is portrayed by Kanna Hashimoto. He is featured as a playable character in Super Light. The game Dragon Quest of the Stars features him as an accessory that can be used as part of the player's character. He also appears in Dragon Quest Tact as a playable character.

== Conception and design ==
The Healslime, the species Healie belongs to, was first introduced in Dragon Quest II as a variant of the Slime race that has the ability to heal. Its design was created by Akira Toriyama, and this design was also used for Healie in Dragon Quest IV and other titles. Like Healslimes, Healie is also able to heal. Healie was included as a partner to Ragnar McRyan in order to facilitate dialogue in place of Ragnar, who is a silent protagonist during the first chapter. This was done as part of a belief by Yuji Horii, the creator of Dragon Quest IV and other Dragon Quest games, that having partners who can speak for the silent character helped enhance the storytelling. Due to how strong the fan reaction was to having Healie in the team in Dragon Quest IV, Horii decided to feature monster taming as a mechanic in Dragon Quest V. He is voiced by Marika Kōno in the Japanese version of Dragon Quest Monsters: The Dark Prince.

== Critical reception ==
Healie's pursuit of becoming a human was the subject of critical commentary.

Healie has received generally positive reception, identified as the first memorable companion monster in the Dragon Quest series by IT Media. In a Futabanet poll, Healie was ranked among the best Dragon Quest IV characters, placing above Ragnar. Futabanet writer Yamaguchi Quest felt that many Dragon Quest fans would likely regard him as the best companion, finding the way that he talks to Ragnar cute. IT Media writer Tetsuya Amano also found him cute, considering him the highlight of the first chapter. He discussed how Healie was used to help introduce players to the mechanics of Dragon Quest IV in conjunction with Ragnar; while Ragnar's lack of magic abilities helped emphasize the importance of equipment, Healie illustrated the importance of a support character to compensate, and the latter's inability to be controlled helped in-game combat to not get too complicated. The staff of RPGFan agreed, appreciating how the automated support Healie provides made the game accessible for people new to the genre. Mike Solossi of RPGFan disliked the AI of Dragon Quest IV, though noted that despite the shortcomings of Healie being controlled by it in the Nintendo DS port of IV, he called the character "such a good little slime" he couldn't stay mad at.

Further praise came for the character's portrayal, with his human appearance in The Dark Prince becoming a hot topic on social media according to the staff of Den Fami Nico Gamer. Dengeki Online writer Yasuchika called him a memorable character, appreciating what Healie did for Ragnar as a healer, as well as how it portrayed Ragnar as kind for letting him tag along. The mook Nostalgia Famicom Perfect Guide considered Healie an example of the moe aesthetic, commenting how much their heart warmed when they realized Healie eventually became human. The sentiment was shared by Hiromu Tashita of Magmix, who considered Healie their favorite monster in the series and recounted how excited they were when they first met them. Gamer writer Aya considered Healie her favorite companion in the game, finding him cute and considering him a reliable character and a soothing one to have in her party. Futabanet writer Amami discussed how intriguing Healie was as a character thanks to his dialogue, noting how significant the Party Chat feature added to the PlayStation was due to that. They expressed hope that, by the end of the game, he and Ragnar would reunite now that Healie has become human. Dengeki Online staff appreciated the additional dialogue the Party Chat system produced for him, finding it cute and echoing the earlier moe comparison and feeling that he stood out among companion characters in Dragon Quest IV. They further expressed a desire to see Healie be a part of the Hero's main party instead of Ragnar, though noting that they still enjoyed Ragnar as a character.
