= Ragnar McRyan =

Dragon Quest characters

- Dragon Quest character
- Ragnar in Dragon Quest IV
- First game: Dragon Quest IV (1990)
- Created by: Yuji Horii
- Designed by: Akira Toriyama
- Voiced by: Japanese: Tomokazu Sugita; English: Gordon Cooper

Ragnar McRyan, known in Japan as Ryan (Japanese: ライアン, Hepburn: Raian) is a fictional character in the 1990 video game Dragon Quest IV. He is one of multiple characters who assist the game's Hero in their battle against the monster Psaro. He stars in chapter 1, allying with the monster Healie to rescue children kidnapped by Psaro's minions. He was the first playable character in the NES version of the game. He has appeared in multiple other games, including the Itadaki Street and Dragon Quest Heroes series.

Ragnar was designed by Akira Toriyama, and was given a Scottish accent in the English version of the Nintendo DS remake. He has received generally positive reception, with critics noting how he represented an old-fashioned, uncomplicated type of hero that they felt is absent in newer games.

== Appearances ==
Ragnar first appears in Dragon Quest IV for the NES. While he is not the main character, he is the first character players are able to control. Ragnar is a warrior who, at the beginning of his chapter, is tasked with discovering the identity of whomever is responsible for the kidnapping of children. He meets a Cureslime named Healie who aspires to become a human, joining Ragnar in helping rescue the kidnapped children. Ragnar and Healie eventually do battle with those responsible, minions of Psaro, and succeed in rescuing the children. Ragnar and Healie venture out of the kingdom in order to search for the Hero and aid them in the fight against Psaro. In the fifth chapter, Ragnar encounters the Hero before the battle against a monster named Marquis de Leon, joining them in their quest. In the PlayStation remake of Dragon Quest IV, a brief prologue starring the Hero that takes place before Ragnar's chapter is added.

Ragnar appears in a series of Dragon Quest IV comic strips, where he is on a quest to buy new clothes.

== Concept and creation ==
Ragnar was created by Yuji Horii and designed by Akira Toriyama. Ragnar was called Ryan in Japanese, but was called Ragnar in the English localization. According to writer Kurt Kalata, his name was changed to Ragnar McRyan to explain the differences in names between these two versions. In the Nintendo DS remake, Ragnar is made to speak in a Scottish accent. He is voiced by Tomokazu Sugita in Dragon Quest Heroes: The World Tree's Woe and the Blight Below and its sequel, Dragon Quest Heroes II. Sugita expressed surprise at being offered the role, imagining Ragnar as too old a character for him to fit. He also felt that his performance was inadequate, though Horii felt otherwise.

== Reception ==
Dengeki Online writer Yasuchika recounted feeling confused about whether Ragnar was a warrior or a soldier, determining he was a warrior due to how mobile his armor was. While they noted Ragnar's character was just an old man wearing underwear and pink armor, they nevertheless felt that it worked well, calling his design cool and praising Toriyama for his character design ability. They also commended how kind Ragnar was for allowing Healie to join his quest despite being a monster. A fellow Dengeki Online writer noted that, while preferring Healie as a character and finding him cute, they nonetheless found Ragnar a quality character, suggesting he was moe for his pink armor. Famitsu writer Mill☆Yoshimura recounted their experience first playing Dragon Quest IV as a child, expressing how confused they were to be playing as him instead of the Hero given that they had just put in the name for the Hero. He also expressed his anticipation to see what would happen with Ryan, as well as Healie. Futabanet writer Yamaguchi Quest felt that Ragnar, as well as Healie, were designed to introduce players to how the game works. Quest pointed out how Ragnar not being able to use magic helped make players aware of the value of equipment, while Healie helped provide healing magic Ragnar had no access to. RPGFan staff agreed with Ragnar being a solid introduction for players new to RPGs, feeling that his chapter represented an approximation of the first Dragon Quest game in terms of its mechanics. Magmix staff felt that Ragnar's usefulness diminished later in the game, arguing that the cost of his better equipment and low speed made him less useful than support characters and magic users.

Eurogamer writer Simon Parkin felt that Dragon Quest IV was a "breath of fresh air," attributing this to Ragnar's character design and personality. He compared Ragnar to certain Japanese character trends, stating that he was "in no way a character designed off the back of some intense Japanese schoolgirl demographic focus testing." He also felt that he was neither an aspirational or marketable character, feeling that a character like him being as important as he was represented an "anti-hero casting that feels braver and more interesting than pretty much any that's happened in the genre since." They also felt that the story structure of Dragon Quest IV helped facilitate a chapter starring a character like Ragnar. RPGamer writer Philip Bloom begrudged the lack of "old fashioned heroes" in newer games, choosing to highlight Ragnar as an example of this. He felt that Ragnar was a manly character, appreciating that he was a straightforward character who aspired to do the right thing and who never felt the need to show off how "badass" he was.
