= Hero (Dragon Quest IV) =

Dragon Quest IV protagonist

- Dragon Quest character
- Art of the male and female Hero for the remake of Dragon Quest IV
- First game: Dragon Quest IV (1990)
- Created by: Yuji Horii
- Designed by: Akira Toriyama
- Voiced by: Japanese: Takeshi Kusao (male); English: Joshua Wichard (male)

The Hero is the protagonist of Dragon Quest IV, and can be male or female. They do not have a default name, and can be given a name by the player. They are the second Hero in Dragon Quest to allow players to make them male or female, and the first to give the female Hero a distinct design. During the course of the story, the game's antagonist, Psaro, causes the death of their village, including their friend Eliza. They journey to defeat Psaro, joining other characters along the way. They are also the ancestor of the bride from Dragon Quest V.

Their design was created by Akira Toriyama. There was originally meant to be more differences between the male and female Hero, but the game's designer, Yuji Horii, remembered to do this too late in development to implement this. The Hero has been the subject of discussion by critics, both for their tragic story and the female Hero. Multiple critics appreciated the existence of the female Hero, particularly due to being able to play as a woman in a role-playing game, which was not as common at the time.

== Appearances ==
In the Nintendo Entertainment System version of Dragon Quest IV, the player has the opportunity to name the Hero, though the game opens with one of the main characters, Ragnar McRyan. In the PlayStation version of the game, a prologue was added that introduces the Hero earlier in the story. Each chapter has a different starring character, with chapter 2 starring Alena, chapter 3 starring Torneko, and chapter 4 starring Maya and Meena, all of whom eventually join the Hero's party.

In the fifth chapter, the Hero's village is attacked by Psaro and his minions, aspiring to kill the prophesized Hero. To protect them, the Hero's friend, Eliza, uses magic to impersonate the Hero, dying in their place, at which point the Hero goes on a quest to defeat Psaro. After one of Psaro's minions called Aamon used humans to murder Rose, the love of Psaro, Psaro loses his mind, using a technique called the Secret of Evolution to become monstrous. He is ultimately defeated by the Hero and their party.

In the PlayStation version, a new sixth chapter is added that involves reviving Rose and having her save Psaro, who becomes an ally of the Hero and helps them defeat Aamon.

While not making an appearance themselves, in Dragon Quest V, it's revealed their descendants were hunted down due to the fear that a new Legendary Hero could destroy Grandmaster Nimzo, with only three descendants of theirs remaining. One of them would marry the Hero and give birth to the new Legendary Hero who would set out to vanquish Grandmaster Nimzo.

The male Hero appears as a playable character in the fighting game Super Smash Bros. Ultimate as one of four skins for the character "Hero" alongside the Dragon Quest III Hero and Dragon Quest VIII and Dragon Quest XI heroes.

== Concept and creation ==
The Hero was designed by Dragon Quest series character artist Akira Toriyama. The Hero in Dragon Quest IV can be male or female, similar to the Hero in Dragon Quest III. Similar to the previous Hero, the difference between the dialogue when playing as a male or female Hero is limited. Due to criticism from players about the limited differences in III, the game's designer, Yuji Horii, intended to rectify that with this game's Hero, but never got around to it. Horii noted that he forgot about the feature until midway through development, at which point he didn't bother with it. Where the female Hero in Dragon Quest III was largely indistinguishable from the male Hero, the female Dragon Quest IV could be told apart based on the visuals.

== Reception ==
Alongside the Hero of Dragon Quest V, they are considered among the unhappiest protagonists in the Dragon Quest series. Magmix staff felt a connection between Psaro and the Hero, discussing how the similar tragedies of losing someone they cared for turned players' hatred for Psaro into something more complicated. The author found the scene exceptional, noting that role-playing game stories. Magmix staff also discussed whether Eliza reappearing in the ending was a happy ending for the Hero. They noted that the Hero still lose everyone else in the village, but also questioned whether Eliza's appearance was an illusion or not. 4gamer writer Kenichi Maeyamada felt similarly about the scene, speculating that it may be a fantasy of the Hero's. When discussing the new ending where Psaro joins the Hero, Magmix staff felt that the resolution of Psaro's story felt unresolved, namely due to the loss of life as well as the fact that Psaro nevertheless committed atrocities, and that Psaro hated humans even before Aamon's plan.

The female version of the Dragon Quest IV Hero was particularly well-received. Multiple RPGFan writers praised her and her design, including Adura Bowling, Michael Solossi, Wes Issiff, and Alana Hagues. Bowling appreciated the female Hero, commenting that she wished she knew about her as a child due to her desire to play more video games with a female protagonist. She also appreciated her design, calling it wonderful, while Solossi enjoyed her "voluminous hair" and her outfit. Hagues felt that Toriyama was particularly good at female character designs, regarding the female Hero as one of his best, and Issiff regarded her as his favorite Hero designs in the Dragon Quest series. Manga author Kazusa discussed growing up with the idea that video games were for boys, and that girls shouldn't play video games. She added that being able to play as a girl in Dragon Quest IV was a significant moment for her. Huffington Post writer Shino Tanaka identified the female protagonist in both Dragon Quest III and Dragon Quest IV stood out among video games of that era where most protagonists were male, finding it to be a "ray of hope" for female gamers. Futabanet writer Masaki Tsuda found the design for the female Hero more distinct than the male Hero.
