= Alena (Dragon Quest) =

Dragon Quest IV character

- Dragon Quest character
- Alena in Dragon Quest IV
- First game: Dragon Quest IV (1990)
- Created by: Yuji Horii
- Designed by: Akira Toriyama
- Voiced by: EN: Denise Gough; JA: Shoko Nakagawa

Alena (Japanese: アリーナ, Hepburn: Arīna) is a fictional character in the 1990 video game Dragon Quest IV, one of its main characters. She is the star of the second chapter, going out to explore the world and become a strong warrior with her retainers Kiryl and Borya, before discovering her kingdom wiped out. She later joins with the protagonist of the game in their quest to defeat the leader of the monsters, Psaro, and save the world. Her design was created by Akira Toriyama, and she is voiced in Japanese by Shoko Nakagawa. She is a fan favorite Dragon Quest IV character, noted as a strong female character by multiple critics, one from RPGFan noting how rare this was on the NES.

== Appearances ==
Alena appears in Dragon Quest IV as one of its main characters. She is first introduced in chapter 2 as the main character of the chapter. She desires to go out and explore the world and to become a warrior, but her father, the king, refuses to allow it, asking her to behave more princess like. Disobeying him, she punches through her bedroom wall to break out and go on her own. She is stopped by her retainers, Kiryl and Borya, who allow her to go, but only if they accompany her. They explore the world, assisting various people, first by posing as a human sacrifice in a nearby village in order to get the jump on the monster responsible, defeating him. She later learns that her father has fallen mute, causing her to seek out a treatment for him. After curing him, he apologizes for being overprotective, allowing her to teleport to the city of Endor. There, the princess is slated to be wed to whomever wins the local tournament, leading Alena to join the tournament to prevent this. She is slated to fight a man named Psaro the Manslayer, though he does not show, making her the winner by default and not marrying the princess. After the arena, a soldier from the kingdom finds her and tells her to return before dying. She returns to find the kingdom devoid of life, leading to them to investigate the cause.

Alena later appears in the fifth chapter, searching for a cure for a fever Kiryl developed. The protagonist helps cure him, and the three join them in their quest to defeat the monsters led by Psaro and save the world. Together, they eventually discover that a demon named Baalzack was responsible for the harm that befell her kingdom, killing him in revenge. She accompanies the protagonist in their quest, eventually facing off against Psaro, who uses a power called the Secret of Evolution to become monstrous, before he is ultimately defeated. In the PlayStation and Nintendo DS versions of the game, an extra chapter was added, which has Psaro joining the protagonist, Alena, and the others to defeat a traitorous minion of Psaro, Aamon.

== Concept and creation ==
Alena was created for Dragon Quest IV, designed by Akira Toriyama. She is one of the game's main characters, and the lead character of the second chapter. She is voiced in Japanese by Shoko Nakagawa in Dragon Quest Heroes: The World Tree's Woe and the Blight Below and its sequel, Dragon Quest Heroes II, offered the role by Yuji Horii. In an interview, Nakagawa noted she was excited to portray Alena, with her having been a character in her life for a long time. She referenced herself frequently visiting Luida's Bar in Roppongi and growing excited whenever she saw Alena on one of the screens. She also portrays Alena in live action.

== Reception ==
Alena has received generally positive reception, being voted the second most-popular female character in the Dragon Quest series by readers of IT Media. She has been identified as one of the most popular characters from Dragon Quest IV by RPGFan and Inside Games. Inside Games writer Gen Gamachi felt she was an essential element to any discussion about Dragon Quest IV, appreciating that later versions of the game allowed him to see more sides of her, particularly her princess and girly side. Famitsu writer Satoruri expressed a desire to find Alena in the mobile gacha game Dragon Quest Tact, noting how strong she is and that she was the character she used the most in Dragon Quest IV along with Maya. When asked who his favorite member of the Dragon Quest IV cast was, voice actor Hikaru Midorikawa picked Alena, suggesting that his role as Kiryl influenced his affinity for her.

RPGFan writer Wes Illiff regarded Alena as one of the greatest female characters in role-playing games (RPGs), feeling that she stood in opposition to the notion of NES RPGs at the time that women were either damsels in distress or healers. He called her "the butt-kicking princess we all need and deserve" and that "games are still struggling to make a character as perfect" as her. Fellow RPGFan writer Mike Solossi agreed, considering her possibly the best female character on the NES. He discussed how the first impression players have of her is her defying the expectations of her to be a good princess. He also commented on her gameplay inspiration, suggesting that she is based on the Martial Artist class from Dragon Quest III.
