= Dragon Quest IV =

1990 video game

Dragon Quest IV: Chapters of the Chosen
- Box art of the original North American NES release, titled Dragon Warrior IV
- Developer: Chunsoft: Heartbeat, ArtePiazza (PS) ArtePiazza, Cattle Call (NDS)
- Publisher: Enix: Square Enix (2007-present)
- Director: Koichi Nakamura
- Producer: Yukinobu Chida
- Designer: Yuji Horii
- Programmers: Kan Naito; Manabu Yamana
- Artist: Akira Toriyama
- Writer: Yuji Horii
- Composer: Koichi Sugiyama
- Series: Dragon Quest
- Platform: Famicom/NES: PlayStation Nintendo DS Android iOS
- Release: February 11, 1990: Famicom / Nintendo Entertainment System; JP: February 11, 1990; NA: October 1992; PlayStation; JP: November 22, 2001; Nintendo DS; JP: November 22, 2007; NA: September 16, 2008; EU: September 12, 2008; AU: September 11, 2008; Android & iOS; JP: April 17, 2014; WW: August 7, 2014
- Genre: Role-playing
- Mode: Single-player

Dragon Quest IV: Chapters of the Chosen, (Note: Known in Japan as Dragon Quest IV: Michibikareshi Monotachi, lit. "Dragon Quest IV: The Chosen Ones" (Japanese: ドラゴンクエストIV 導かれし者たち).) titled Dragon Warrior IV when initially localized to North America, (Note: Known as Dragon Quest: The Chapters of the Chosen in PAL regions.) is a 1990 role-playing video game, the fourth installment of the Dragon Quest video game series developed by Chunsoft and published by Enix, and the first of the Zenithian Trilogy. It was originally released for the Famicom on 11 February 1990 in Japan. A North American NES version followed in October 1992, and would be the last Dragon Quest game localized and published by Enix's Enix America Corporation subsidiary prior to its closure in November 1995, as well as the last Dragon Quest game to be localized into English prior to the localization of Dragon Warrior Monsters in December 1999. The game was remade by Heartbeat for the PlayStation, which eventually was available as an Ultimate Hits game. The remake was ported by ArtePiazza to the Nintendo DS, released in Japan November 2007 and worldwide in September 2008. A mobile version based on the Nintendo DS remake was released in 2014 for Android and iOS.

Dragon Quest IV differs from the rest of the series by breaking up the game into five distinct chapters, each of which focuses on a different protagonist or protagonists. The first four are told from the perspective of the Hero's future companions and the fifth one, from the Hero's perspective, brings all the characters together as they start their journey to save the world. The remake adds a sixth chapter.

== Gameplay ==
The Hero and the party with a wagon that is able to travel through one of selected dungeon areas in the NES version of Dragon Quest IV, where menu commands and character stats are displayed

Dragon Quest IV offered several new features over the first three titles, while carrying on many of those introduced in the previous games. Similar features included are the day and night cycles, the ability to travel via ship and a flying vehicle (this time, a hot air balloon), and the three levels of keys. They are Thief, Magic and Ultimate (originally localized as Final). There are also travel doors, which allow the party to move a great distance on the world map with little travel. Unlike the Hero in Dragon Warrior III, the Hero of Dragon Quest IV is not required to be in the party at all once the wagon becomes available. Despite this, the Hero is again the character that possesses the most powerful healing and attack spells. Many spells, weapons, armor, and shops (including the vault/bank) function the same as in past games.

In addition to the new chapter-based storylines, an artificial intelligence system called "Tactics" was implemented that allowed the player to provide strategies to the party members (who become NPCs in the final chapter), such as prioritizing damage, healing or MP conservation, while maintaining full control of the Hero. Dragon Quest V: Hand of the Heavenly Bride, Dragon Quest VI: Realms of Revelation and the remakes of IV allow tactics to be set for characters individually rather than using one tactics mode for all characters, as well as including the "Follow Orders" Tactics mode, which allows other characters to be controlled manually. This "Tactics" system is seen as a precursor to Final Fantasy XII's "Gambits" system. The wagon, first introduced in this game, allows the player to choose which characters are used in battle. The wagon can also be seen in Dragon Quest V, Dragon Quest VI, and Dragon Quest Monsters: Caravan Heart (JP release only). The first casino appears in this installment as a place to play several mini-games (slot machine, poker, and the Monster Betting that was introduced in Dragon Warrior III) using tokens that could be traded for special items. Searching drawers and inside of jars was first introduced in this game as a means to find items. Small Medals, later Mini Medals, were introduced as a new item to search for and trade for special unique items from a secluded king.

Saving the game was made easier by allowing one to save a game in a House of Healing, rather than talking to a king. Also, the save ("Confession" in the DS remake) and EXP point to the next level-up ("Divination" in the DS remake) are now separate commands. Returning to the format of the original North American Dragon Warrior, programmers allowed users to open a door using a command appearing in the top level of the menu (rather than requiring users to search through various characters' inventories for the key as in some previous games). The only requirement was that at least one character in the party needed to have an appropriate key in his or her inventory. Since this command was added, an unlocked door was added in this game, as well as large Castle Doors. However, this command was eliminated in later games and the remake, in which doors can be opened by attempting to walk through them.

== Synopsis ==
In the original version, the game is divided into five chapters. The first four provide back-story for the Hero's party members, while the fifth follows the Hero themself as they meet up with the other characters.

Chapter One follows the soldier, Ragnar McRyan, who is tasked by the King of Burland to find children who have gone missing from a nearby town, befriending a Healslime named Healie, who aspires to become human. Ragnar finds and defeats the monster responsible for the abductions and returns the children to their homes. In doing so, he learns the monsters were looking for the Legendary Hero, who is supposedly still a child, in order to kill them. Ragnar decides to leave his home and set out on a quest to protect them.

Chapter Two follows the tomboyish Princess Alena and her two friends and mentors, tutor Borya and chancellor Kiryl, as she travels to prove her strength. Partway through her journey, Alena's father loses his voice after speaking of a dream he had depicting the end of the world. After restoring his voice, she travels to the town of Endor to enter a fighting tournament. She defeats all of the combatants except a warrior named Psaro the Manslayer, who fails to appear. After the victory, she returns to her home castle to find all the inhabitants have gone missing, so she sets out to find out what happened to everyone.

Chapter Three follows the merchant, Torneko, a humble merchant working in a weapon shop in his hometown with his wife and young son. His dream is to own his own shop and be the world's greatest merchant. As he travels and performs favors at the towns he visits, Torneko eventually obtains permission to purchase a shop in Endor. Torneko is soon able to obtain the funds to purchase the shop and move his family to Endor. After establishing a successful business with his wife, he hears about a set of legendary weapons, which he sets out to find by funding the construction of an underground passageway to a neighboring continent.

Chapter Four follows the dancer, Maya, and the fortuneteller, Meena, two sisters seeking revenge for the murder of their father by his former student, Balzack. By teaming up with a former student of their father, Oojam, they manage to plot a way into the Palais de Léon and find the man responsible. They attempt to avenge their father's murder by defeating Balzack, but are quickly defeated by Balzack's master, the Marquis de Léon, and are thrown in the dungeon. Oojam sacrifices himself to allow the sisters to escape the castle. They then decide to flee the continent and head for Endor, where they hope to learn more about their new foe and about the Legendary Hero, whom they became aware of during their travels.

Chapter Five follows the game's protagonist, known as "the Hero". It begins with the Hero's hometown being attacked by monsters, led by Psaro the Manslayer. The Hero manages to escape, and is joined by the main characters of the previous chapters. Together, they accomplish various deeds, such as defeating Marquis de Léon and Balzack, as well as collecting various pieces of Zenithian Armor, equipment that can only be worn by the one chosen to save the world. Later, they spy on Psaro and discover that Estark, the Ruler of Evil, has been awakened. They then travel to Estark's palace and defeat him just as Psaro's followers discover him.

In the town of Strathbaile, the heroes have a dream that explains Psaro's plan. Developing a deep hatred of humanity after the death of his elven girlfriend, Rose, at the hands of humans, Psaro plans to become the next Ruler of Evil using the power of evolution he obtained from the "Armlet of Transmutation". The party then complete the set of Zenithian armor to permit entry into the Zenithian Castle. There, they meet the Zenith Dragon, who guides them to Nadiria, where Psaro is undergoing his evolution into the new Ruler of Evil. There, they defeat his generals before challenging him. After fighting a continually evolving form of Psaro, he is vanquished.

The PlayStation and DS remakes include a sixth chapter that acts as an alternate ending. This chapter focuses on the heroes working with Psaro to avenge the death of Rose, and finally put the world back in order. Throughout this chapter, Rose is revived and the party is able to defeat her true killer, the Dark Priest Aamon, one of Psaro the Manslayer's subordinates who intended to take the secrets of evolution for himself and usurp him, setting all plans in motion that drove Psaro to his insanity.

== Development ==
According to Yuji Horii, he wanted to have something the player went around collecting as the previous Dragon Quest games had crests and orbs respectively. However, he did not want to do the same thing over again by forcing the player to collect a certain number of items before they beat the game; mini medals instead have nothing to do with clearing the game. The promotional illustrations for the Japanese version were drawn by famed manga artist Akira Toriyama, who provided the artwork for the previous games in the series and would continue to do so for every future installment.

=== 1992 North American localization ===
Unlike all the other games up to this point, the changes in this version were not as radical. Among them were the usual religious/violence censorship, new graphics for the opening copyright and ending credits, and the betting in the Casino was slightly modified to allow more money being won during a bet.

=== PlayStation remake ===
One of the overworld areas of the PlayStation Dragon Quest IV remake

Dragon Quest IV was remade for the PlayStation on November 22, 2001, in Japan. It was developed by Heartbeat and published by Enix. The remake was developed using Dragon Quest VII's 3D graphics engine. The characters, towns, world maps, sound, battles and enemies all received updates. The character sprites were updated to match the original artwork for the characters in the original Dragon Quest IV Manual and artwork. With this remake came several new features. Among these features were a new chapter in which Psaro is available as a party member (as well as a prologue chapter), an intra-party talk command similar to Dragon Quest VII, and the ability to turn off the artificial intelligence for party members to allow for direct control of their attacks (except UC Party Members). The game sold over one million copies in Japan by the end of 2001.

Enix America originally planned to bring the remake to North America in 2002. The company had even advertised this upcoming release on the back cover to the US instruction manual for Dragon Warrior VII. However, the remake was later canceled, due to Heartbeat closing its video game development operations before the localization and translation could be completed. It was later explained that the cost and time that a different company would need to invest to complete the translation prevented Enix from passing this to another developer, as Heartbeat was the most familiar with their own design.

=== Nintendo DS remake ===
Dragon Quest IV was later re-released for the Nintendo DS in Japan in November 2007. The game has been remade into a 2D/3D hybrid, similar to the PlayStation version. This release has kept many of the enhancements from the PlayStation, such as the slightly altered immigrant town, but has received enhanced upgrades to smooth the graphics further, and improved sound. This release also allows players to take manual control of all of their party members in the final two chapters.

Shortly after the Japanese release, several people editing the Japanese ROM file discovered a near complete English translation along with Spanish, French, German, and Italian translations already inside the Japanese game. On April 9, 2008, Square Enix applied for a trademark to the title "Chapters of the Chosen", and speculation began that this was the new subtitle to Dragon Quest IV for an American release.

On April 18, 2008, Dragon Quest IV: Chapters of the Chosen was found to have a rating of E10+ by the ESRB, for Alcohol Reference, Animated Blood, Mild Fantasy Violence, Mild Language, Simulated Gambling, and Suggestive Themes. An official release date of September 16, 2008 was finally established on the official North American site. The game was released in Europe under the title Dragon Quest: Chapters of the Chosen, omitting the number IV in a similar fashion to the European version of Dragon Quest VIII.

This version of the game contains an entirely new translation of the script. It was claimed in Nintendo Power that the new translation has changed the names of many of the main characters, weapons and towns to be closer to, or include their original Japanese names, while adding several new localizations. This version also uses the new spell naming convention first used in Dragon Quest VIII, such as the spell Beat from Dragon Warrior IV becoming Whack. The western translations have been slightly changed in places where the Japanese version included sexual components, and the Japanese version's party talk feature was completely excised from the western versions.

The Nintendo DS English translation includes 13 regional dialects for the various areas, including Burland now being Scottish, and Zamoksva being Russian. Simon Carless of Gamasutra feels that the use of dialects can help some people to understand different cultures, saying, "It has the potential to nurture cross-language and cross-cultural understanding in a very intelligent manner."

A version based on the Nintendo DS remake was released in Japan on April 17, 2014, for Android and iOS. It was released internationally on August 7, 2014. The Android version of the game features cloud saving, autosaves, a quick save feature, and a pause feature for ease of use on the mobile platform. This version also restores the party talk feature removed from the international Nintendo DS releases, being translated into the appropriate language. It also replaces the orchestrated music performed by the Tokyo Metropolitan Symphony Orchestra with synthesized MIDI music in the title screen. However, the synthesized music is entirely remastered in the iOS and Android versions.

== Other media ==
=== Manga ===
A five volume manga called Dragon Quest: Princess Alena was released. It followed the story of Chapter 2, Alena's adventure, but begins to divert during the events in the Birdsong Tower. From this point forward, it introduces several new characters, including the evil Evil Leather Dominatrix Woman, and new locations, including an Arctic location and a haunted house. This story ends with Alena fighting Psaro and defeating him before he goes on with the Golden Bracelet to perfect the secret of evolution.

=== Soundtrack ===
As with every Dragon Quest, Koichi Sugiyama composed the music and directed all the associated spinoffs. The song heard during gameplay depends on a number of factors. A specific track is always played for towns, another for caves or dungeons, another while the party is mounted on the hot air balloon, for instance. Lastly, while out in the world, each of the first four acts has its own theme song, as does the Hero—in act five, the theme song played depends on who is the first character in the formation.

The original Dragon Warrior IV was one of the few NES games to feature a crescendo during the battle music, a gradual increase in volume from soft to loud. This technique was rare for an NES game. However, the PlayStation and Nintendo DS versions do not feature the crescendo in the battle music. This level of detail can be found in the NES version's soundtrack, as well as the 2014 Android and iOS mobile releases.

Dragon Quest IV ~The People Are Shown the Way~ Symphonic Suite is a compilation of music from Dragon Quest IV. The first print of the album was in 1990, the London Philharmonic version came out a year later, and a reprint of the original was released in 2000. In 1991, Enix released a set of videos featuring Koichi Sugiyama conducting the London Philharmonic Orchestra performing the soundtrack in Warwick Castle, along with clips of acting.

== Reception ==
Reception

Aggregate score
Aggregator	Score			
Aggregator	DS	iOS	NES	PS
Metacritic	80/100	86/100		

Review scores
Publication	Score			
Publication	DS	iOS	NES	PS
1Up.com	B+			
AllGame	4/5		3/5	
Computer and Video Games	8.1/10			
Destructoid	8/10			
Eurogamer	8/10			
Famitsu	34/40		9/10, 10/10, 10/10, 8/10	9/10, 8/10, 8/10, 7/10
Game Informer	7/10			
GamePro	4/5			
GameSpot	8/10			
GameSpy	4/5			
GamesRadar+	4.5/5			
GameZone	8.3/10			
IGN	8/10			
Jeuxvideo.com			16/20	
Nintendo Power	7.5/10			
Nintendo World Report	8/10			
Official Nintendo Magazine	78%			
TouchArcade		5/5		
Electronic Games			85%	

Awards
Publication	Award
Famitsu Best Hit Game Awards	Best Game of the Year, Best RPG
Nintendo Power	NES Game of the Year (2nd), Best Challenge

=== Sales ===
Upon release in Japan, the game sold out 1.3 million cartridges and grossed ¥14 billion ($98 million at the time, or $242 million adjusted for inflation) within one hour of its release. By 1992, it had sold 3 million units in Japan. The original Famicom version went on to sell 3.1 million units, becoming the fourth best-selling game of the system, below its predecessor Dragon Quest III. The original game sold a worldwide total of 3.18 million copies, including 3.1 million in Japan and 80,000 in the United States, grossing several hundred million dollars by 1993 ($740 million adjusted for inflation).

The PlayStation version of Dragon Quest IV was the fourth best-selling game in Japan in 2001 with over 1 million copies sold, and has sold nearly 1.2 million copies as of December 26, 2004. As of August 8, 2008, the DS remake has sold 1.15 million units in Japan, and 1.46 million copies worldwide as of May 31, 2009.

=== Critical response ===
Dragon Quest IV was awarded "Best Game Grand Prize" and "Best RPG Game" in Famitsu magazine's 1990 Best Hit Game Awards. It was also awarded "Best Challenge" and 2nd place "Best Overall Game" (NES) in 1993 by Nintendo Power.

In 1997 Electronic Gaming Monthly editors ranked Dragon Warrior IV the 58th best console video game of all time, calling it "easily the best RPG ever released for the NES - in the U.S. or Japan." They particular cited the epic length of the game's quest. In August 2008, Nintendo Power ranked Dragon Quest IV the 18th best Nintendo Entertainment System video game, describing it as the peak of the NES' Dragon Quest series and praising it for its innovative five-act story that made it one of their favourite old-school role-playing games. Readers of Famitsu voted the game as the 14th best game of all time in a 2006 poll. In particular, critics noticed with interest that the game's third chapter, Torneko's, departed largely from standard RPGs by making the only goal to collect money and by allowing players to have Torneko simply working in an in-game store.

Dragon Quest IV: Chapters of the Chosen was a nominee for Best RPG on the Nintendo DS in IGN's 2008 video game awards. Critics pointed out that the game may feel outdated, especially to players not accustomed to Dragon Quest games, but that some of the characters, such as Ragnar, make the game stand out of the recent JRPGs. "Ragnar McRyan is in no way a character designed off the back of some intense Japanese schoolgirl demographic focus testing", wrote Eurogamer's Simon Parkin, pleased.

=== Legacy ===
Dragon Quest IV is the first game in the series to spawn spin-offs. The merchant Torneko (also known as Taloon in the NES version) was popular enough to star his own series, in which he finds himself in quests in order to expand his store. These games are the Torneko no Daibouken sub-series (translated as Torneko's Great Adventure), roguelike and random dungeon games produced by Enix (and Square Enix) and developed by Chunsoft. The success of the games later inspired the creation of the Mystery Dungeon series.

Ragnar, Healie, and Torneko all later appear as cameos in Dragon Quest VIII: Journey of the Cursed King in the Monster Arena. Torneko later cameos in Dragon Quest Yangus as a merchant. In the Dynasty Warriors spin-off Dragon Quest Heroes: The World Tree's Woe and the Blight Below, Alena, Kiryl, Maya, and Psaro appear as playable characters; they are joined by Torneko and Meena in Dragon Quest Heroes II, and the compilation port Dragon Quest Heroes I·II for Nintendo Switch also includes Ragnar as a console-exclusive character for Heroes II. The male version of the protagonist also appeared as a playable character in the 2018 crossover fighting game Super Smash Bros. Ultimate via downloadable content. He is fully voiced for the first time by Takeshi Kusao.
