= Dragon Quest VIII =

2004 video game

Dragon Quest VIII: Journey of the Cursed King
- North American PlayStation 2 cover art
- Developer: Level-5 (Note: Square Enix developed the 3DS version)
- Publisher: Square Enix (Note: Nintendo published the Nintendo 3DS version overseas for Square Enix)
- Director: Akihiro Hino
- Producers: Ryutaro Ichimura; Yoshiki Watabe
- Designer: Yuji Horii
- Programmer: Yasuhiro Akasaka
- Artists: Akira Toriyama; Takayuki Sameshima; Kazunari Matsuo
- Writers: Yuji Horii; Jin Fujisawa; Atsushi Narita
- Composer: Koichi Sugiyama
- Series: Dragon Quest
- Engine: Unity (Android/iOS)
- Platforms: PlayStation 2, Android, iOS, Nintendo 3DS
- Release: November 27, 2004: PlayStation 2; JP: November 27, 2004; NA: November 15, 2005; AU: April 12, 2006; EU: April 13, 2006 Android, iOS; JP: December 12, 2013; WW: May 28, 2014 Nintendo 3DS; JP: August 27, 2015; NA: January 20, 2017; EU: January 20, 2017; AU: January 21, 2017
- Genre: Role-playing
- Mode: Single-player

Dragon Quest VIII: Journey of the Cursed King (Note: Known in Japan as Dragon Quest VIII: Sora to Umi to Daichi to Norowareshi Himegimi, lit. "Dragon Quest VIII: Sky, Sea, Earth, and the Cursed Princess" (Japanese: ドラゴンクエストVIII 空と海と大地と呪われし姫君), and in Australia and Europe as Dragon Quest: The Journey of the Cursed King.) is a 2004 role-playing video game developed by Level-5 and published by Square Enix for the PlayStation 2. It was first released in Japan in November 2004, followed by North America in November 2005 and PAL regions in April 2006. It is the eighth installment of the Dragon Quest series and it is the first English version of a Dragon Quest game to drop the Dragon Warrior title. A version of the game for Android and iOS was released in Japan in 2013 and worldwide in 2014, with a version for Nintendo 3DS releasing later in 2015 in Japan and 2017 globally.

Dragon Quest VIII uses cel shading for the characters and scenery and is the first game in the series to have fully 3D environments and character models. The game retains most of the series' role-playing game elements, such as turn-based combat and the experience level system. Dragon Quest VIII follows the silent protagonist and his party of allies as they journey towards the goal of defeating the wicked Dhoulmagus, who cursed the kingdom of Trodain and its people. Dragon Quest VIII was a critical and commercial success, and has appeared on various best-of video game lists.

== Gameplay ==
Dragon Quest VIII retains the same menu-based battle system used in previous series installments.

Dragon Quest VIII is a role-playing video game in which the player controls the Hero in a fully three-dimensional environment. Players are able to pan the camera a full 360 degrees around the character, as well as look in a first-person perspective mode. The visual controls allow players to examine people and objects more closely than the top-down perspective of the game's predecessors. With a new fully integrated world, towns and dungeons are no longer identified by two-dimensional icons found on the world maps. Players can guide the Hero across vast landscapes to reach full-size towns and buildings.

Battles are randomly occurring and turn-based. When encountering an enemy, the game switches to a battle scene with the enemies facing the party where characters from both sides take turns attacking each other. These battle scenes have visually changed dramatically from earlier games in the series, yet retain a similar text based menu system for battles. In the earlier games, battles were shown from a first-person perspective. For this installment, the battles are shown in a first-person perspective while choosing what to do, but the view then shifts to a third-person perspective with all of the members of the Hero's party shown on the screen along with the enemies. During battle, each character in the party has the ability to attack, use items, or use magic and skills. Dragon Quest VIII also introduced the tension system, which allows the player to choose the "Psyche Up" command for a character during battle. This command allows the player to skip a character's turn in order to build "tension", making that character's next attack stronger. By using it multiple times in succession, the character's attack will do more damage. Another new feature, the Alchemy Pot allows players to mix items in order to create new, stronger items. This can be done while walking on the world map. There is also a monster capturing feature, but it is not as fundamental to the gameplay as it was in Dragon Quest V. The player may find enemies visible on the world map that can be recruited if defeated and used during the Monster Arena mini-game and during battle.

Through the traditional experience point system, characters advance through experience levels and develop their abilities, similar to previous games in the series. Defeating enemies grants experience points and gold to the party, which allows the player to purchase items and weapons at in-game shops. In addition to this, Level-5 incorporated a secondary skill development system to allow players a chance to customize each character to their liking. After characters gain an experience level past level four, they accrue skill points distributed as the player chooses among five different skills—three different weapon skills (which vary from character to character), "fisticuffs", and a character-specific special attribute. Gaining enough points in a skill can allow the character to gain strength in weapons and learn new abilities and magic spells.

== Synopsis ==
=== Characters ===
Dragon Quest VIII focuses on four main characters, each joining the battle party early in the game.

The main protagonist of the game, an eighteen-year-old royal guard of Trodain and the only person present in the castle to escape Dhoulmagus' wrath unscathed, is a silent hero, and named by the player. He is the most balanced party member, able to equip swords, spears, boomerangs and use magic. He is immune to all curses. His special attribute is courage.

He is accompanied by Yangus, a former thief and friend of the Hero's who owes the Hero a life debt after the Hero rescues him from the side of a cliff. Yangus is a physically strong character and speaks with a Cockney accent in the English versions, and wields axes, clubs, and scythes. His special attribute is humanity.

Jessica Albert, is a sorceress from the town of Alexandria who seeks to avenge her murdered brother, Alistair. She uses magic but can also equip whips, knives, and staves. She can stun enemies with her special attribute Sex Appeal skills. She is also the only character who can change her appearance in battle through various costumes, with the exception of one costume for the Hero.

Angelo is a womanizing noble who was raised in a monastery following both his parents' deaths by a plague. He is a member of the Knights Templar and decides to battle against Dhoulmagus when the villain sets fire to his abbey and kills the abbot. In battle, he can use both magic and physical attacks effectively and has the most healing spells. He can wield swords, bows, or staffs. His special attribute is charisma.

Two non-player characters journey with the protagonists: Trode, the titular cursed king who rules over Trodain but was transformed into a toad-like creature by Dhoulmagus; and Medea, Trode's daughter, who is transformed into a horse. Munchie, the Hero's pet mouse, becomes temporarily playable under certain circumstances. Other important non-player characters include Empyrea, a powerful god-like bird; and Marcello, Angelo's adoptive brother and the Captain of the Templars.

The antagonist of Dragon Quest VIII is Dhoulmagus, a jester who steals an ancient scepter from Trodain Castle and uses its power to curse the inhabitants of the castle, setting the game's events in motion. Dhoulmagus is eventually revealed to be a pawn of Rhapthorne, a demonic lord and the game's true antagonist, who is manipulating the jester in an attempt to free himself from the scepter inside of which he has been imprisoned.

In the 3DS version, two previously non-player characters join the battle party: Red, a female bandit and former colleague of Yangus' with whom she shares a rivalry; and Morrie, the proprietor of an underground monster-fighting arena.

=== Plot ===
The game begins with the court jester of the kingdom of Trodain, Dhoulmagus, stealing an ancient scepter and casting a spell on Trodain castle. The spell turns the king, King Trode, into a troll; the princess, Medea, into a horse; and the rest of the castle's inhabitants into plants. The only one left unaffected is the unnamed protagonist, a Trodain guard. The guard, King Trode, and Princess Medea set out on a quest to track down Dhoulmagus and break the spell. They are joined by Yangus, a bandit whose life the hero saves from a collapsing bridge; Jessica, a mage seeking to avenge her brother; and Angelo, a Templar Knight with a penchant for flirting and gambling. Tracking Dhoulmagus' murderous path, the party journeys west, across the ocean. Eventually, the group hunts down Dhoulmagus and kills him, but Dhoulmagus' death fails to break the spell. Jessica claims Dhoulmagus' scepter, and soon after disappears.

Jessica later returns, possessed by the staff and battles the remaining party members in an attempt to murder a young man. After the party releases Jessica from her possession, Jessica tells them that the scepter contains the spirit of Rhapthorne, the Lord of Darkness, who was imprisoned in the scepter long ago by seven sages. He seeks to escape from his prison by killing the descendants of the sages. She proceeds to speculate that it is Rhapthorne, and not Dhoulmagus, who maintains the curse on Trodain: therefore, Rhapthorne must be defeated if the curse is to be broken. When Jessica explains this, the scepter takes control of a magician's dog, Sir Leopold, and kills the magician's assistant, who was one of the descendants of the sages. The party attempts to seek out and defend the remaining descendants, but Leopold manages to murder another descendant of the sages. Eventually, the scepter comes into the possession of Marcello, Angelo's power hungry half-brother. Marcello kills the last remaining descendant of the sages, but manages to contain Rhapthorne for a time. Eventually, the party engages Marcello and exhaust him to the point of losing control and releasing Rhapthorne. The party, aided by the godbird Empyrea, faces Rhapthorne and defeats him. With Rhapthorne dead, King Trode, Princess Medea, and the people of Trodain are returned to normal. Months later, the protagonist escorts Medea to Savella Cathedral for her arranged marriage to the spoiled Prince Charmles of Argonia, but before the ceremony can take place, the protagonist and Medea escape from Savella Cathedral and live happily together. In an unlockable extended ending, it is discovered that the protagonist is the lost prince of Argonia, and upon this revelation, the King of Argonia decides to allow the protagonist to marry Medea. In the 3DS version, the player can choose to instead begin a romance with Jessica. In the traditional ending the hero goes traveling the world with Jessica while in the unlockable ending the hero can choose to marry Jessica instead of Medea.

== Development and release ==
The international PlayStation 2 release uses a new menu interface, allowing its players to access items and equip their party.

The original Japanese PlayStation 2 (pictured) and the Nintendo 3DS versions retain the same menu interface used in previous series installments.

Like the other games in the series, Yuji Horii was staffed as the scenario director. Critics praised the colorful designs done by art designer Akira Toriyama of Dragon Ball fame. Koichi Sugiyama composed the music for the game. Dragon Quest VIII was released in Japan on the morning of November 27, 2004, with a celebration at Starbucks in Shibuya, Tokyo, starting at 6:30 am. Horii and Square Enix President Yoichi Wada both made appearances at the event, and several of the first buyers in line received a toy Slime.

From August through October before the game's US release, the "Simon dTOUR Live" Mall Tour featured playable demos at participating malls across the US. These free events gave away Dragon Quest merchandise and also featured live entertainment. A demo disc for Dragon Quest VIII was also released during the fall of 2005 through Shonen Jump magazine. The game was released in North America on November 15, 2005, and shipped with a playable Final Fantasy XII demo disc. Additions and changes to the North American version of Dragon Quest VIII included voice acting, new animations, enhanced music and sound effects, additional spells and attacks, and a new menu interface. In a Nintendo Direct in November 2015, it was shown that the game would be releasing for the 3DS in 2016.

Dragon Quest VIII was the first game in the series to bear the Dragon Quest name (rather than Dragon Warrior) in North America. Dragon Quest's North American name had been changed due to a trademark conflict with the pen-and-paper role-playing game DragonQuest, published by wargame publisher Simulation Publications in the 1980s, until the company's bankruptcy in 1982 and purchase by TSR, Inc., which then published it as an alternate line to Dungeons & Dragons until 1987. In 2003, Square Enix registered the Dragon Quest trademark in the US, making the Dragon Warrior name obsolete. As this installment of the series was the first after 2003 to be released outside Japan, it was the first to receive the Quest in its title.

Unlike the original Japanese version, the North American and European localizations of the game mark a departure from previous Dragon Quest titles due to the inclusion of voice acting in certain parts of the adventure pertaining to the advancement of the storyline. The game retains the series' tradition of allowing the player to name the lead character, reconciling the two by having the voice acting script skip incidences of the Hero's name, (e.g. the line "Okay, Hero, my boy..." appears on-screen, while the voice acting says, "Okay, my boy...") and occasionally replacing the name with Yangus' nickname for him, "guv" (as in "governor", pronounced with a Cockney accent). Unlike some earlier games in the series, which were censored during localization for North America, Dragon Quest VIII had no such censorship. The English translation is credited to Plus Alpha Translations and AltJapan Co., Ltd. Richard Honeywood, of Square Enix's localization office and famous for his work with Final Fantasy VIII and Chocobo Racing, was the main force behind the game's English localization. The iOS and Android version removed the voice acting, akin to the original Japanese PS2 version due to hardware limitations at the time.

Dragon Quest VIII was released in PAL regions in April 2006 under the title Dragon Quest: The Journey of the Cursed King, dropping the Roman numeral. This marked the first time a main game in the series had been released in the PAL region. In an interview with Horii, he mentioned that the 2003 merger between Squaresoft and Enix (creating Square Enix) allowed the company to release more games in more localities, with producer Ryutaro Ichimura adding that "European tastes have changed because of the influence of anime and cartoons, so Europeans are more willing to receive this type of artwork."

=== Music ===
As with most Dragon Quest games, Koichi Sugiyama wrote the game's original score. An official soundtrack for Dragon Quest VIII was released in December 2005, published by Aniplex. In the Japanese release of the game, the game features sequenced music, whereas the North American and PAL versions contained the symphonic suite orchestral recordings performed by the Tokyo Metropolitan Symphony Orchestra, with Sugiyama serving as the conductor. The 3DS versions swaps the soundtracks with the Japanese version using the symphonic suite orchestral recordings, while the North American and PAL versions use the sequenced music, which was entirely remastered, other than the original sequenced music in the Japanese PS2 version. The iOS and Android version uses the sequenced music from the Japanese PS2 version.

== Reception ==
Reception

Aggregate score
Aggregator	Score
Metacritic	PS2: 89/100 iOS: 78/100; 3DS: 85/100

Review scores
Publication	Score
1Up.com	A
Edge	8/10
Eurogamer	9/10
Famitsu	39/40; 9/10, 9/10, 8/10, 8/10 (3DS)
GameSpot	9/10
IGN	9/10
Nintendo World Report	10/10 (3DS)
Pocket Gamer	4/5
TouchArcade	4.5/5
X-Play	5/5

Released for the PlayStation 2 on November 27, 2004, in Japan, Dragon Quest VIII sold 2,167,072 units in two days, 3 million in three days, and more than 3 million within a week, becoming the fastest-selling PlayStation 2 title in Japan. By September 2008, total worldwide shipments of Dragon Quest VIII surpassed 4.9 million copies, of which over 430,000 were from the North American release. Dragon Quest VIII is the biggest selling game ever for the PlayStation 2 in Japan. It was the first Dragon Quest game to receive a score of 39 out of 40 from Famitsu. It won both 1UP.com's and GameSpy's "Best RPG of E3 2005" award, ahead of runner-up Kingdom Hearts II. During the 9th Annual Interactive Achievement Awards (now known as the D.I.C.E. Awards), Dragon Quest VIII received a nomination for "Role-Playing Game of the Year". The iOS version became the 2nd top-seller of Japan AppStore in the debut half day, highlighting the influence of the series. The Nintendo 3DS version was nominated for "Handheld/Mobile Game of the Year" at the Golden Joystick Awards, for "Best Portable Game" at Destructoid's Game of the Year Awards 2017, and for "Handheld Game of the Year" at the 21st Annual D.I.C.E. Awards. In 2023, Time Extension included the game on their "Best JRPGs of All Time" list.

The US release of Dragon Quest VIII received mostly positive reviews, receiving a score of 89 out of 100 on Metacritic. Critics were quick to praise the 3D cel shaded visuals, noting that it was the first game in the series to be fully three-dimensional. A staple of the Dragon Quest series is the simplicity of its gameplay, a factor which has been criticized in the past. However, several critics pointed out that the simple gameplay works for Dragon Quest VIII. Bethany Massimilla of GameSpot wrote that the lack of "dozens of characters of all types" allows the game to remain simple, letting the player become very familiar with the main characters. Edge magazine, however, commented that the game's substance seemed out of place for 2005.

A majority of reviewers cited the English localization of the game as one of its best qualities. Nich Maragos of 1UP.com praised the game's British tinted localization, saying how the humor is often successful except for "a few puns that will, on occasion, make you want to die." Parkin described the voice acting as "a mash up of Monty Python and The Princess Bride: fantasy farce driving the cute narrative in the ideal aural vehicle." The game's world map has also been a major topic of praise for critics. The 1UP.com staff suggested that the player stop playing "to just look around and absorb the scenery" and said that it rivals Grand Theft Auto: San Andreas' map of San Andreas in size and detail. IGN writer Jeremy Dunham wrote that the "only exception in the game's mass list of progression is the plotline," explaining that it has one of the more basic Dragon Quest stories; but he also mentions that the game still manages to take a simple plot and make it entertaining.

== Legacy ==
Characters from the game have made appearances in other Square Enix properties. Jessica and Yangus are playable characters in Dragon Quest Heroes. In the sequel Dragon Quest Heroes II, Jessica is instead accompanied by Angelo. Dragon Quest Yangus, a roguelike Mystery Dungeon game by Cavia for the PlayStation 2, follows the story of a young Yangus; it was released in Japan in 2006. Jessica, Angelo, and Yangus also appear opposite other Dragon Quest characters, as well as Final Fantasy and Mario characters in titles of the Itadaki Street franchise, a crossover board game spanning multiple platforms. Appearances include Dragon Quest & Final Fantasy in Itadaki Street Portable for the PlayStation Portable, Itadaki Street DS for the Nintendo DS and Itadaki Street Wii/Fortune Street, an enhanced remake of Itadaki Street DS for the Wii. Dragon Quest VIII characters also make appearances in Dragon Quest IX: Jessica, Angelo, and King Trode appear as special Wi-Fi guests in the Quester's Rest inn in Stornway, Dhoulmagus and Rhapthorne appear as optional legacy bosses, and the player can acquire a "Trodain Royal Guard" costume to dress as VIII's Hero. The protagonist's outfit was also a free downloadable add-on for the Hero in Dragon Quest XI via the Champion's Pack, and select songs from Dragon Quest VIII can be played in place of the game's usual soundtrack.

The protagonist appears as a playable character in the 2018 crossover fighting game Super Smash Bros. Ultimate. He is one of four Dragon Quest protagonists that collectively share a moveset under the moniker of "Hero," alongside the protagonists of Dragon Quest III, IV, and XI. To further differentiate him from the other protagonists, he is also referred to by the name "Eight". He was specifically chosen due to Dragon Quest VIII being the most popular entry in the West at that point. The character would be voiced for the first time by Yuki Kaji who, according to Ultimate's director Masahiro Sakurai, said it was a dream of his to do voicework for both the Super Smash Bros. and Dragon Quest series.
