= Dragon Quest II =

1987 video game

Dragon Quest II: Luminaries of the Legendary Line
- North American NES box art
- Developer: Chunsoft (Note: HD-2D remake developed by Artdink and Square Enix Creative Studio V.)
- Publisher: Enix
- Director: Koichi Nakamura
- Producer: Yukinobu Chida
- Designer: Yuji Horii
- Programmer: Koichi Nakamura
- Artist: Akira Toriyama
- Writer: Yuji Horii
- Composer: Koichi Sugiyama
- Series: Dragon Quest
- Engine: Unreal Engine 4 (HD-2D remake)
- Platform: Nintendo Entertainment System: MSX MSX2 Super Famicom Game Boy Color Mobile phone Wii Android iOS Nintendo 3DS PlayStation 4 Nintendo Switch Nintendo Switch 2 PlayStation 5 Xbox Series X/S Windows
- Release: January 26, 1987: NES; JP: January 26, 1987; NA: September 1990 MSX; JP: February 1988 MSX2; JP: May 1988 Super Famicom; JP: December 18, 1993 Game Boy Color; JP: September 23, 1999; NA: September 21, 2000 Mobile phones; JP: 2005 (DoCoMo); JP: 2006 (BREW); JP: 2006 (SoftBank) Wii; JP: September 15, 2011 Android, iOS; JP: June 26, 2014; WW: October 9, 2014 Nintendo 3DS, PlayStation 4; JP: August 10, 2017 Nintendo Switch; WW: September 27, 2019 HD-2D Remake Windows, Switch, Switch 2, PS5, Xbox Series X/S; WW: October 30, 2025
- Genre: Role-playing
- Mode: Single-player

Dragon Quest II: Luminaries of the Legendary Line, (Note: Known in Japan as Dragon Quest II: Akuryō no Kamigami, lit. "Dragon Quest II: The Evil Gods" (Japanese: ドラゴンクエストII 悪霊の神々).) titled Dragon Warrior II when initially localized to North America, is a 1987 role-playing video game developed by Chunsoft and published by Enix for the Nintendo Entertainment System as a part of the Dragon Quest series. Enix's U.S. subsidiary published the American release, Dragon Warrior II, for the Nintendo Entertainment System in 1990. Dragon Quest II is set one hundred years after the events of the first game.

The game's story centers on the prince of Midenhall, who is ordered to stop an evil wizard named Hargon after Hargon destroys Moonbrooke Castle. On his adventure, he is accompanied by his two cousins, the prince of Cannock and the princess of Moonbrooke (and the princess of Cannock in Dragon Quest I & II HD-2D Remake). Dragon Quest II expands on the first game by having a larger party, more areas to explore, multiple heroes and enemies in a battle, and a sailing ship. The game's successor, Dragon Quest III, follows the ancestor of the main characters, the legendary hero Erdrick; and the three games are collectively called "The Erdrick Trilogy".

Planning began a month before the original Dragon Quest was released. One major goal was the development of a more exciting combat system, which was inspired by similar multi-character party systems such as the one found in Wizardry. The artwork that was used as the basis for the characters and monsters was painted by Akira Toriyama and then translated into pixel art. The game was hit with delays due to game balance, which were only fully corrected in the early sections of the game. This, combined with a staff that included students not familiar with the coding and debugging process, pushed back the release by a month. The developers also had many ideas that had to be discarded due to the technical limitations of the Famicom system, though some were later incorporated into subsequent remakes and the game's sequel, Dragon Quest III.

Dragon Quest II was successful in Japan; the original Famicom version shipped over 2.4 million copies. Later, the game was remade for the Super Famicom and the Game Boy Color and combined with the original Dragon Quest game in a release entitled Dragon Quest I & II. A version of the game for Android and iOS was released in Japan on June 26, 2014, and worldwide on October 9, 2014, as Dragon Quest II: Luminaries of the Legendary Line. The game was praised for improving on almost all aspects of the original, including having better graphics, having a larger world to explore, and more characters to participate in a more dynamic combat system.

Dragon Quest II is known as one of the most difficult Dragon Quest games, especially in its late game, and retained that reputation even in later ports to other platforms that made the game somewhat more forgiving.

== Gameplay ==
The party wanders in a castle.

Dragon Quest II is a role-playing video game. It allows the player to control more than one character, each of whom has their own characteristics, and it is the first game in the Dragon Quest series to do so. The game introduced a party system where, instead of beginning the game with an entire party as was common in previous computer RPGs, the player begins the game with only one character and gradually recruits more party members during the course of the game. The player controls his or her characters as they move in the game world. They can search treasure chests, talk and trade with villagers, equip themselves with weapons and armor, and cast spells.

While wandering fields, towers, caves, seas, and dungeons, the player randomly encounters monsters, after which the game shifts to battle mode. The game's battle mode introduces groups of monsters, which is an upgrade from the one-on-one battles of Dragon Quest. In the battle mode, the player gives orders to the characters on how to fight the monsters. Once the player defeats all of the monsters, the characters gain experience points and gold. The experience points raise the characters' experience levels. This improves the characters' attributes, and they may also learn new spells.

To win, the player must fight monsters to improve the characters' experience levels and get gold to buy better weapons and armor. Eventually, the player's characters become strong enough to make it to the next town or dungeon. This repeats until the player reaches the final boss and defeats him. However, the gameplay is not necessarily linear, especially after the player gets the boat. Exploration is a key component of the game. The game offers a few spots to save the game. In most of the towns, talking to a king or minister saves the game. In the American version, which incorporated a battery for saved games rather than the password system of the original, talking to the king also allows for the deletion and moving of saved games.

Dragon Quest II is noted for greatly expanding upon the gameplay of the previous game, Dragon Quest. The game is the first in the series to feature multiple heroes and enemies in a battle, as well as a sailing ship. It also allowed the player to land the ship anywhere, making it possible to explore the entire game world in an open-ended manner. It included other new gameplay features such as weapons which cast spells when used in battles. Compared with its predecessor, Dragon Warrior II offers a wider array of spells and items and a much larger world. The game also expanded the inventory management system of its predecessor by giving each character an individual inventory that holds up to eight items, placing a greater emphasis on conservative item management between the characters. Dragon Quest II: Luminaries of the Legendary Line was also the first Dragon Quest game to include a game of chance (played with Lottery Tickets that the player finds), and was also the first Dragon Quest game to use multiple key types and to include travel doors (warp gates).

== Plot ==
Dragon Quest II is set one hundred years after Dragon Quest. The story begins with an attack upon Moonbrooke Castle by the wizard, Hargon, who seeks to summon the demon, Malroth, to destroy the world. A wounded soldier escaped the battle and fled to the kingdom of Midenhall, where he informs the king of the attack before he dies. The king then commands his son, who is a descendant of Erdrick (known as Loto in Japanese translations and some later localizations), to defeat Hargon.

The Prince begins his quest alone, but is later joined by two cousins: the Prince of Cannock and the Princess of Moonbrooke (as well as the princess of Cannock in Dragon Quest I & II HD-2D Remake). After finding the Prince of Cannock, who began a similar journey at the same time as the Prince of Midenhall, they restore the Princess of Moonbrooke to her human form, having been transformed into a dog during Hargon's assault on Moonbrooke Castle, which was reduced to ruins. As the heroes quest to find and defeat Hargon, they secure a ship that allows them to travel across oceans to reach new continents, including Alefgard, which is where Dragon Quest took place. There, they meet the grandson of Dragonlord, the villain from the previous game, who gives the party valuable information. He tells them that, by collecting the five crests hidden around the world (which the Hero of Dragon Quest I helped the faeries craft in the HD-2D Remake), the party can create the Charm of Rubiss, allowing them to defeat Hargon and his illusions. After obtaining the Charm of Rubiss, the party travels to Hargon's castle in the ice-covered plateau of Rhone and confronts Hargon in his throne room. Hargon is defeated, but he offers himself to Malroth and the demon emerges to destroy the heroes. Together, the heroes slay Malroth and return to Midenhall, where the Prince is named the new king.

In the HD-2D Remake, after certain events in the postgame, the Will of Darkness emerges and engulfs Malroth before sending the Scions of Erdrick into the void and revealing Malwrath, an enhanced form of Malroth controlled by Calasmos. Together, the heroes, with the aid of Rubiss and Ramia, destroy Malwrath and a new dawn is unleashed upon the world. As he's dying, it is revealed that Hargon was possessed and corrupted by Calasmos in order for him to satisfy the latter's own goals. The ending then proceeds the same. Afterwards, Ramia takes the party to Aliahan, the birthplace of the Hero from Dragon Quest III, where they learn about the origins of their ancestor.

== Development ==
Like other main games in the Dragon Quest series, Yuji Horii wrote the story for Dragon Quest II, Akira Toriyama did the artwork, and Koichi Sugiyama composed the music. Co-creator Koichi Nakamura, Chunsoft's president, directed the game and did half of the programming.

Planning for Dragon Quest II began in April 1986, a month before the release of the original Dragon Quest. With the system and memory map decided, they started development in early July. At the beginning of development, producer Yukinobu Chida asked director and programmer Koichi Nakamura for a definite release date, and he offhandedly set one. Then the development team was divided into two groups, with one designing the story, as well as the monsters, and one doing the programming. The initial deadline was set for early November, but the game ultimately suffered a small delay. The development team had finished programming almost everything by the time of the initial release and believed the game could be released by the end of that year. In the Japanese magazine Weekly Shōnen Jump, published on November 11, 1986, it was announced that the game would be released in late December. However, the developers found that the game was too difficult, so it was delayed for a month to adjust the balance. They had to finish the final version in mid-December, which they did, and then rushed to deliver to Nintendo to make the physical game cartridges. The game was released on January 26, 1987.

The developers believed that Dragon Quest's one-vs-one combat system was "tedious" and too simple, and that the leveling system was "boring"; as such, they decided to have Dragon Quest II use a party system with players controlling multiple characters. In another game from the time entitled Wizardry, players can control a party of up to six characters directly; Nakamura saw this, liked the idea, and wanted to do something similar. Due to technical restrictions, they decided to use only three characters; the Famicom video game system supports the display of up to eight sprites side by side, and one game character used two units in a direction, so it was possible for up to three characters to talk with a non-playable character (NPC). Yuji Horii believed many players would play Dragon Quest II without first playing Dragon Quest, and thus had players search for the other party members. During development, the staff discussed the idea of deprecating the "stair" command of the predecessor several times. Nakamura has stated that the Cave of Rhone found in the game is inspired by a classic trick to exit mazes, that of always moving forward while sticking to the right-hand side wall to avoid traps.

In the story group, monsters were the first thing designed. The monsters' names, skills, and personalities were decided first, after which they were drawn by artist Akira Toriyama. Yuji Horii allowed Toriyama to paint full drawings rather than directly create the pixel art that would be shown in the game. The artwork was then converted into computer graphics; as Toriyama was unfamiliar with computer graphics technology, other staff took charge of this. Many new monsters needed to be designed to make the game feel real, and the process was laborious for Toriyama. But he has also said that, compared to the manga comics he was used to, he enjoyed painting more, so on balance the experience was positive. Yuji Horii stated that for his process, like other manga and film creators, he quickly outlines the story's plot in his mind. With regard to map design, a blank map was used to create the physical shape of the place, like a castle, cave, or tower, and then the key elements and story were created together afterwards. The scenarios were mainly written by his friend Hiroshi Miyaoka. Compared with write lines in writing paper and design map in graph paper, staff wrote both two in 5 mm graph papers of A4, as they felt that was easy for organizing; their manuscript thickness is 15 cm.

Compared with its predecessor, the game was more advanced in nearly all technological aspects. Koichi Nakamura programmed with several students. However, since it was his first time working with a team, he did not know how to delegate work or communicate his goals. Since the students were unfamiliar with the coding process, they did not know how to debug or to keep track of whose code it came from, so Nakamura had to do it himself, which caused delays. In programming, they did the maps first. Then they worked on characters, including numbered characters in maps for assigned lines, and designed the NPC's moving route. The next step was programming the items, while the final step was setting the monsters data and converting Toriyama's artwork. This work was completed by the end of October.

Due to the aforementioned balance issues, the game was initially very difficult, especially in the later stages. Nakamura had written a program that simulated every single combat that he used to adjust the game's setting for character leveling and the strength of enemies players would encounter. This program failed to account for larger monster groups, however, which fell outside the model and caused the game to be very difficult. Furthermore, enemies leveling and weapons power were designed by area, but Koichi Nakamura did not think over the boat, so if players get the boat to some land might be quickly defeated. The developers realized there was a balance problem and did some modifications, such as limiting the number of enemies in Midenhall to groups of three, and moving the Cannock Castle closer to Midenhall Castle.

Due to a lack of cartridge space, many ideas were abandoned during development, such as an alternate ending that the Lorasia Prince is assassinated by the Prince of Cannock's sister if he dies in the final battle. Some elements were later used in remakes or sequels: a subplot about the Prince of Cannock being cursed was added to the Super Famicom remake and later remakes. Also, the Promontory of Olivia in Dragon Quest III was initially an idea for Dragon Quest II. The game cartridge's ROM capacity is 1 Mbit, but only about 10 bytes of free space remains in final products.

=== 1990 North American localization ===
The North American release of the game as Dragon Warrior II was created by Enix themselves and published in 1990. Unlike the original Japanese Famicom version, which used passwords for saving, the NES version used an internal battery backup instead to record the player's progress. The storyline introduction in Moonbrooke is presented exclusively in Dragon Warrior II. In the Japanese original, the game starts right with the injured soldier from Moonbrooke entering Midenhall castle, seeking help from its king. The dialogue of the American localization often used (intentionally) archaic English vocabulary, among other differences from the Japanese version. Like Dragon Warrior, the American version of Dragon Warrior II was censored in some aspects; for example, it used a ghost-like sprite instead of the original defeated character's coffin with cross sprite.

=== Music ===
Koichi Sugiyama composed and directed the music for the game. The first album of Dragon Quest II, Suite Dragon Quest II ~Gods of the Evil Spirits~, was released in February 1987. It covers ten orchestra version soundtracks with a twenty-five minute "original sound story"; this suite was performed by the Tokyo Strings Ensemble. Some of the tracks are classical and some are jazz. On August 20, 1987, the first "Family Classic Concert" was held. In this concert, Dragon Quest and Dragon Quest II's music was performed by the Tokyo Strings Ensemble. Later in October 1987, the concert recording was released as a symphonic suite CD under the title Dragon Quest in Concert. Music of Dragon Quest II were also released as a piano CD, a Drama CD and several Symphonic Suite albums. Dragon Quest II's musics were also collected in music compilations, like Symphonic Suite Dragon Quest Best Selection Vol.1 ~Roto~ (1997), Dragon Quest Game Music Super Collection Vol. 1–3 (2001–2002), Symphonic Suite Dragon Quest Complete CD-Box (2003) and Symphonic Suite Dragon Quest Scene-Separated I~IX (2011).

"Only Lonely Boy", the background music in the game's name and password input interface, was arranged as a vocal promotional song and released as a single by Anna Makino named “Love Song Sagashite”. Since the sequel takes place 100 years after the original Dragon Quest, Sugiyama decided to use pop music to suggest the game took place at a later time than the previous game. This music is also used for Japan professional baseball team Chiba Lotte Marines' fight song. The song that is played when wandering the fields of Dragon Quest, "Unknown World", is also played when the Hero is in that area. The ending theme "My Road, My Journey" is also the ending song of related anime Dragon Quest: The Adventure of Dai.

=== Remakes ===
Release years by platforms
Platform	JP	NA	EU
Famicom/NES	1987	1990	N/A
MSX	1988	N/A	N/A
MSX2	1988	N/A	N/A
Super Famicom	1993	N/A	N/A
Game Boy Color	1999	2000	N/A
Cellphones	2005	N/A	N/A
Wii	2011	N/A	N/A
Android, iOS	2014		
PlayStation 4, Nintendo 3DS	2017	N/A	N/A
Nintendo Switch	2019		

Dragon Quest II was ported to MSX computers in February 1988, but the ported version had many issues like choppy scrolling, black-surround characters titles, poor graphics, along with sluggish combat and menus. The MSX2-ported version was released in May 1988 in Japan.

On December 18, 1993, Dragon Quest II was remade and combined with Dragon Quest as part of Dragon Quest I & II for the Super Famicom, which used Dragon Quest V's engine. Besides enhanced in graphics and sound, gameplay was also improved. The Super Famicom remake features an improved enemy targeting system: if an enemy is defeated before a character who was assigned to attack can perform its attack move, the character will attack another enemy rather than do nothing like in the Famicom version. And like its successors, players can find stat-improving items from pots or dressers. The Super Famicom remake was only released in Japan.

In 1999, Dragon Quest I & II was released for Game Boy Color; the game is also compatible with the Game Boy. A year later, it was localized in America as Dragon Warrior I & II. This remake is similar to the Super Famicom version, but with 8-bit graphics. Compared with the NES version, it featured better graphics and was less difficult. The remake also provided a quick-save function to allow players save and load game anywhere unless they reset the Game Boy. In the Game Boy Color localization, the main characters' and towns' names were retranslated to be similar to the original Japanese names: legendary hero "Erdrick" was retranslated as "Loto", and the castle name "Midenhall" was re-dubbed "Lorasia". The original translation had a lot of errors, and Enix changed the names to help fix that.

Dragon Quest II was remade for Japanese NTT DoCoMo brand cell phones in 2005. The remakes size was four times bigger than the original Dragon Quest port, and since phone capacity was limited, the game was divided into two parts. The first part was pre-installed in cell phones and the second part could be downloaded for free. The world map was provided by a pre-installed PDF file. In 2006 Japanese mobile companies BREW and SoftBank also started selling the game on their mobile platforms.

Both the Famicom and Super Famicom versions of this game, along with Dragon Quest and Dragon Quest III, were re-released under the Dragon Quest 25th Anniversary Collection compilation for the Wii in Japan on September 15, 2011. The Wii compilation featured interruptive save functions for each games. The compilation also included original copies of the strategy guides for the games, along with original artwork and material on the games' development.

Square Enix announced the first eight Dragon Quest titles would be re-released on Android and iOS in Japan. This Dragon Quest II was based on the previous cell phone version while optimized for smartphones and was released on June 26, 2014, in Japan. An English version was released on October 9, 2014, under the title Dragon Quest II: Luminaries of the Legendary Line. Square Enix registered this trademark in Japan in 2013, and in United States in early 2014.

In the Nintendo Direct in June 2024, a HD-2D remake of Dragon Quest and II was announced, and was released on October 30, 2025, for Microsoft Windows, Nintendo Switch, Nintendo Switch 2, PlayStation 5 and Xbox Series X/S.

== Other media ==
Several guide books were published: the first was published by Shueisha in February 1987, the second by Tokuma Shoten in July 1987, and the third by game publisher Enix in 1988 as an "official guide book".

Similar to other early main games in the series, Dragon Quest II was novelized and adapted to game books. The Dragon Quest II Novel was written by Hideo Takayashiki and published in 1989; it was reprinted in 1991 and 2000. The Dragon Quest II Game Book series was also published in 1989.

== Reception and legacy ==
Reception

Aggregate scores
Aggregator	Score					
Aggregator	GBC	iOS	NES	NS	PC	SNES
GameRankings	82%					
Metacritic		76/100		60/100		
OpenCritic				95% recommend	95% recommend	

Review scores
Publication	Score					
Publication	GBC	iOS	NES	NS	PC	SNES
Electronic Gaming Monthly			6/10, 7/10, 6/10, 5/10			
Famitsu	30/40		9/10, 10/10, 10/10, 9/10			35/40
GamePro			18/25			
GameSpot	9.6/10					
IGN	8/10					
Nintendo Power	8/10					
TouchArcade		4/5				

Award
Publication	Award
RPGamer	Game Boy Color Award of the Year for 2000

=== Sales ===
Dragon Quest II received both critical and financial success in Japan. The Famicom version sold 500,000 copies on its first release in Japan, and 2.4 million copies by the end of the year, grossing several hundred million dollars. The Famicom version's total sales had later increased to 2.41 million as of 2008. The Super Famicom and Game Boy Color remakes together shipped in excess of 1.92 million copies worldwide. The Japan Mobile version was downloaded more than one million times. The game was included in a 2011 compilation called Dragon Quest Collection for the Wii, which sold 403,953 copies.

=== Reviews ===
Readers of Family Computer Magazine gave it a score of 28.02 out of 30, and named it the best overall cartridge game of the year. In 2006, readers of Famitsu magazine voted the game the 17th best video game of all time.

The game is generally known for fixing problems found in the first game, including improvements such as allowing parties of three characters, having a larger world, better graphics, and the ability to carry more items. Other noted improvements were keys that can be used multiple times and new strategic elements introduced because of larger parties and larger groups of enemies. The game's music is often praised, despite its limited 8-bit capabilities. Considered a classic for the RPG genre, the game is regarded as praiseworthy. Japanese reviews highlighted the Famicom version's difficulty, stemming from issues such as the many traps in the Cave of Rhone, and the final boss's ability to cast a "Healall" spell, and this has led to some critics calling the game "the most difficult Dragon Quest". After Dragon Quest III was released, director Koichi Nakamura said "In result, Dragon Quest II received favourable reviews from everybody, but as myself on the creator's side, I feel that I did about only half what I wanted to do."

Remakes of Dragon Quest II were also successful and well received. Famitsu awarded the Japanese Super Famicom remake a 35/40. The Game Boy Color remake got a 30/40 from Famitsu, and the U.S. version, Dragon Warrior I & II, received fairly high marks, including an 8.0 out of 10 from IGN, a 9.6 out of 10 from GameSpot, and 8 out of 10 from Nintendo Power. It also received the RPGamer's Game Boy Color Award of the Year for 2000.

=== Other media ===
The release of Dragon Quest II also promoted sales of the original Dragon Quest, and with the success of Dragon Quest II, the series became a Japanese cultural phenomenon. The sequel to Dragon Quest II, Dragon Quest III: The Seeds of Salvation, was released in 1988 in Japan. It serves as a prequel to the first two games and follows the ancestor of the main characters, the legendary hero, Erdrick; the three games are collectively called "Erdrick Saga Trilogy". Also with the success of the Game Boy Color remake, Enix released a Game Boy Color Dragon Warrior III in 2001, which was based on the Japan-only Super Famicom update of the original Dragon Quest III. The world of Dragon Quest II was later used as the setting of Dragon Quest Monsters: Caravan Heart on the Game Boy Advance.
