= Psaro =

Dragon Quest IV villain

- Dragon Quest character
- Psaro in Dragon Quest IV for the Nintendo DS
- First game: Dragon Quest IV (1990)
- Created by: Yuji Horii
- Designed by: Akira Toriyama
- Voiced by: Japanese: Daisuke Ono; English: Gwilym Lee

Psaro (Japanese: ピサロ) is a fictional character in the 1990 video game Dragon Quest IV. He is the primary antagonist of the story, leading a charge to wipe out humanity for the sake of demons, particularly due to his infatuation for an elf named Rose, who suffered under humans. He wishes to find and kill the human prophesized to one day defeat him, which causes him or his minions to come into contact with one or more of the multiple main heroes of the game who later come to support the prophesized hero in their quest. He comes to assume the form of Psaro the Manslayer after a tragedy pushes him to the brink. A sixth chapter was added to the PlayStation version that expands Psaro's story and features him as a playable character. He is also the protagonist of the 2023 game Dragon Quest Monsters: The Dark Prince. His design was created by Akira Toriyama. Psaro has been generally well received, praised as a tragic villain and for the multiple forms he goes through in the battle against him.

== Appearances ==
Psaro appears as the antagonist of Dragon Quest IV, alluded to during the first chapters of the game. Before the events of the game, Psaro leads an army against humanity in part due to humans' treatment of Rose, an elf he has fallen in love with and faces mistreatment from humans due to her ability to cry ruby tears. Among his army are several high-ranking monsters, including Balzack, Marquis de Leon, and Aamon. To protect Rose from humans, he constructed a fortress to keep her in. Despite Rose's call for Psaro to live in peace with humanity, Psaro persisted in his plan. Aamon eventually convinces Psaro to allow his animosity to take over, preparing to resurrect the Lord of the Underworld, Estark, He was also made aware of a prophecy that said a human hero would defeat Estark, leading Psaro to hunt down young humans to prevent this by killing them.

At the beginning of the fifth chapter, the Hero of the game has their town destroyed by Psaro's minions, killing everyone except them, including the Hero's friend Eliza, who transforms themselves into the Hero to die in their place. The Hero goes on a quest to defeat Psaro, recruiting various characters who fought against Psaro's minions, including Ragnar McRyan, Alena, Kiryl, Borya, Torneko, Maya, and Meena. After he succeeded in resurrecting Estark, the Hero and their allies are able to defeat Estark. Before Psaro can fight the Hero, he is informed that Rose has been kidnapped by humans; he leaves to save her, but she is murdered before he can. Psaro lost control, using the Secret of Evolution which he and his army have been researching to kill all humans. In truth, Aamon orchestrated her death, intending to cause Psaro to descend into madness so he can rule monsterkind himself. Psaro went to the underground land of Nadiria, surrounded by his top henchmen, including Aamon. After defeating them, the Hero fights Psaro as the monstrous Psaro the Manslayer who goes through multiple transformations, losing appendages and gaining new ones. The Hero eventually kills Psaro, ending the war.

In the PlayStation remake of the game, a new sixth chapter was added. In this, the Hero pursues an alternative method of overcoming Psaro, which involves resurrecting Rose. After they succeed, they bring Rose to Nadiria to confront Psaro. Upon seeing Psaro's form, she begins to cry, her ruby tears undoing the effects of the Secret of Evolution and turning him back to normal. Upon learning from her of Aamon's involvement in her death, Psaro joined the Hero as a playable character, intending to defeat Aamon. They do battle with Aamon, who has perfected the Secret of Evolution, and eventually defeat him. He decides to abandon his crusade against humans, going to live with Rose in peace.

== Concept and creation ==
Psaro was created for Dragon Quest IV, and his design was created by Akira Toriyama. When choosing a protagonist for Dragon Quest Monsters: The Dark Prince, Yuji Horii suggested that Psaro be used. The game's producer Kento Yokota felt that an antagonist being a protagonist made for a more refreshing approach for a story.

== Reception ==
Psaro was a popular character among Dragon Quest fans. Inside Games writer Gen Gamachi discussed how emotional the story of Dragon Quest IV made them, particularly due to the similar stories between the protagonist and Psaro. He noted that he and the hero have experienced similar tragedies despite their different positions in the story, stating that this has engendered special feelings towards him by fans. Excite News writer Kukanshakyo described Psaro as a famous boss battle due to his changing forms, which he felt make players "tense and hopeless" as they wondered when the fight would be over. He also regarded him as the saddest boss in the series. RPGamer writer Mark McLaughlin discussed Psaro and his tragic story; while he felt it was cliche, it was innovative for its time. He also discussed his own feelings over the loss of his father, as well as abuse he suffered from his mother and father. He discussed how he "held on against the darkness," hoping he would not become someone like Psaro himself. Magmix writer Seiichiro Hayakawa felt strongly about the tragedy between Psaro and Rose, empathizing with his hatred for humanity.

RPGFan staff, including Michael Sollosi, Alana Hagues, and Zach Wilkerson, did a podcast discussing Psaro. Hagues felt that Psaro was a major contributing factor in why Dragon Quest IV was such a beloved game. She argued that he was a more fleshed out villain than others on the NES at the time, believing him to have more development than other villains on the NES like Ganon in The Legend of Zelda and Cloud of Darkness in Final Fantasy III. Solossi agreed that he was part of the game's success. All three felt that he was a sufficiently intimidating figure in the game, which is enhanced by how much he is alluded to until he is eventually revealed when he destroys the hero's town. Hagues felt that this presentation of Psaro as an unseen character for much of the game, which she felt was different from a number of role-playing game villains that they'd discussed in past podcasts. Sollosi argued that Psaro is done similarly to the villain of the film Jaws, where he stated that a villain is scarier when they are unseen. He made the point that, despite Psaro's appearance in chapter 5, being able to see the mayhem he caused after the fact without seeing him cause it made him a more effective villain. Despite noting that his actions were evil, Wilkerson felt that not being able to see much of the bad actions, or him not being directly involved in some of them, helped make it easier to sympathize with him in the end. Sollosi also felt that he was more sympathetic than most video game villains, saying that despite his atrocities, the fact that he did it out of love and later grief made it more understandable, a sentiment that Hagues agreed with.
