= Dragon Quest III =

1988 video game

Dragon Quest III: The Seeds of Salvation
- North American NES box art
- Developer: Chunsoft (Note: Super Famicom version developed by Heartbeat; Game Boy Color version developed by Tose; iOS and Android versions developed by Matrix Software; HD-2D remake developed by Artdink and Square Enix Creative Studio V.)
- Publishers: Enix (original); Square Enix (2009–present)
- Director: Koichi Nakamura
- Producer: Yukinobu Chida
- Designer: Yuji Horii
- Programmer: Kan Naito
- Artist: Akira Toriyama
- Writer: Yuji Horii
- Composer: Koichi Sugiyama
- Series: Dragon Quest
- Engine: Unreal Engine 4 (HD-2D remake)
- Platforms: Nintendo Entertainment System: Super Famicom; Game Boy Color; Mobile phone; Wii; Android; iOS; Nintendo 3DS; PlayStation 4; Nintendo Switch; PlayStation 5; Xbox Series X/S; Windows
- Release: February 10, 1988: NES; JP: February 10, 1988; NA: March 1992 Super Famicom; JP: December 6, 1996 Game Boy Color; JP: December 8, 2000; NA: July 17, 2001 Mobile; JP: November 19, 2009 Android, iOS; JP: September 25, 2014; WW: December 4, 2014 Nintendo 3DS, PlayStation 4; JP: August 24, 2017 Switch; WW: September 27, 2019 HD-2D Remake Windows, Switch, PS5, Xbox Series X/S; WW: November 14, 2024
- Genre: Role-playing
- Mode: Single-player

Dragon Quest III: The Seeds of Salvation, (Note: Known in Japan as Dragon Quest III: Soshite Densetsu e..., lit. "Dragon Quest III: And into the Legend..." (Japanese: ドラゴンクエストIII そして伝説へ...)) titled Dragon Warrior III when initially localized to North America, is a 1988 role-playing video game developed by Chunsoft and published by Enix. It is the third installment in the Dragon Quest series and was first released for the Family Computer (Famicom) in Japan and later for the Nintendo Entertainment System (NES) in North America. The game saw an enhanced remake for the Super Famicom (the Japanese release of the Super NES) in 1996 and the Game Boy Color in 2001, and a port to mobile phones and the Wii in 2009 and 2011. A version of the game for Android and iOS was released in Japan on September 25, 2014, and worldwide as Dragon Quest III: The Seeds of Salvation on December 4, 2014. It was the first time the game was given an official English subtitle. Later in 2021, another remake of the game titled Dragon Quest III HD-2D Remake, (Note: Known in Japan as HD-2D Edition Dragon Quest III (Japanese: HD-2D版 ドラゴンクエストIII, Hepburn: HD-2D Ban Doragon Kuesuto Surī)) based on the graphical style introduced with Octopath Traveler (2018), was announced to coincide with the franchise's 35th anniversary. The remake was released worldwide on November 14th, 2024 for Nintendo Switch, PlayStation 5, Windows, and Xbox Series consoles.

The first three Dragon Quest games are all part of the same overarching story, collectively known as the "Erdrick trilogy". However, Dragon Quest III is a distant prequel to the previous two games, taking place long before the events of the first game. It follows the Hero destined to earn the title of "Erdrick," who must take up his father's quest to save the world from the villainous archfiend Baramos. Gathering a group of companions into a party, the Hero must travel the world, stopping at various towns and locations, and gather the strength needed to take the archfiend down.

== Gameplay ==
Dragon Quest III is noted for greatly expanding upon the gameplay of the original Dragon Quest and Dragon Quest II. The game uses basic role-playing video game conventions such as leveling up by gaining experience points and equipping items. The battle system is turn-based like the other games in the series, though the remakes incorporate various interface changes from later titles. These include simpler door opening, a bag to store items instead of keeping them at a bank, quick item sorting with "Tidy Item" and "Tidy Bag" command, and a "Full HP" command to automate the process of casting healing and status restoring spells. And while earlier Dragon Quest games were non-linear in structure, Dragon Quest III featured an even more open-world experience. It also allowed the player to freely swap characters in and out of their party and introduced the day/night cycle in which certain items, characters, and quests are only accessible at specific times of the day.

=== Classes ===
In the picture, the player is reselecting one class for a character in Dhama Temple. The class system became a staple feature of many future Dragon Quest games.

Dragon Quest III features a class system, in which each character has a certain class. At the start of the game, the player begins as a single male or female hero but is able to recruit members at the local tavern. While the Hero always keeps the Hero class, the other characters can choose to be any of the following of either gender: Soldier (Warrior in the GBC version), Fighter, Pilgrim (Cleric), Wizard (Mage), Merchant (Dealer), Goof-Off (Jester), Sage, and Thief and Monster Wrangler which are available only in later versions. The choice of class greatly affects the character's stats and spells he or she can learn. Furthermore, upon reaching experience Level 20, a character has the option of changing classes at the temple of Dhama, found halfway through the game. A character who changes classes has their stats halved and restarts at experience Level 1, retaining their spells and, in the remakes, their personality. This allows a player to create a character that knows Wizard spells but has the defense of a Soldier. Unlike most Dragon Quest parties, aside from the Hero, the party is not made up of characters involved in the story. Although only four characters can be in the party at a time, extra members of the party can be kept at the tavern, allowing room for new recruits. Another innovation is an arena where the player can place bets on the outcome of monster battles in order to win more gold.

In the remakes, after selecting a character, the player can change the character's starting abilities with five magical seeds, given at the tavern. Also, each character has a personality trait which affects the growth rate of their abilities. The Hero's personality is determined by the player's choices and actions during a dream sequence at the start of the game, while other characters' personalities are determined by their status at the end of the character generation process. Most personalities are available to both male and female characters, while a few are exclusive to male or female characters. A character's personality can be temporarily changed by equipping certain accessories, or permanently changed by using certain consumable books.

== Story ==
=== Setting ===
The game starts in the castle town of Aliahan. Like the rest of the Dragon Quest worlds, this castle is set in a medieval-like time period, complete with knights and magicians. The party explores several caves, ruins, and castles during the adventure. The geography of Dragon Quest III largely corresponds to the actual geography of Earth, and many towns correspond to their real-world cultures, including "Romaly" for Rome, "Portoga" for Portugal, "Assaram" near present-day Iraq (derived from "as-salamu alaykum"), "Jipang" for Japan (where the hero fights Yamata no Orochi) and even a "New Town" in eastern North America that experiences a revolution against an overbearing ruler (derived from the American Revolution against the United Kingdom in 1776).

=== Plot ===
Dragon Quest III is set many years before the original Dragon Quest in a world separate from the first two games. A wicked fiend named Baramos threatens to destroy the world. The story revolves around the Hero, son or daughter (the player can choose to be either male or female, with few gameplay changes) of the legendary warrior Ortega. On their sixteenth birthday, the Hero is summoned to the castle and is given by the King of Aliahan the challenge to rid the world of the evil archfiend Baramos, which Ortega attempted in the past but seemingly perished in a volcano. The Hero then is able to recruit up to three traveling companions to help fight Baramos.

The Hero leaves their home country of Aliahan to travel the world and complete their father's quest to defeat Baramos. A major portion of the adventure is the quest to acquire the last two of the three keys needed to open doors throughout the game. After saving two people of the town of Baharata from the rogue Kandar and stealing back the King of Romaly's crown, the Hero receives Black Pepper, which they then trade for a sailing ship at Portoga. With the ship, the Hero acquires the Final Key and the six mystical orbs which are used to revive the legendary bird Ramia. Ramia allows the Hero and their party to travel to Baramos' castle, which is surrounded by mountains.

After defeating Baramos in a ferocious battle and returning to Aliahan, the Hero's celebration is cut off as Zoma, Baramos's master and the game's true villain, reveals his existence. He attacks and opens a pit to the Dark World, which the Hero jumps into. The Dark World is, in fact, Alefgard (of the previous installments of the series), where the Hero must acquire several of the artifacts that were collected in the original Dragon Quest, including the Sun Stone and the Rain Staff. Rubiss, a legendary sage, has been turned to stone and is rescued by the Hero, and the Hero receives the Sacred Amulet in return. These items, as in the original game, create the Rainbow Bridge which leads the Hero to Zoma's castle for the final confrontation. Along the way, the Hero briefly reunites with Ortega as he is slain by Zoma's monsters, then continues on to defeat the revived Baramos, now turned into the powerful Baramos Bomus and later into the skeletal Baramos Gonus. With the Ball of Light given by the Dragon Queen, the Hero defeats Zoma and frees Alefgard, but Zoma boasts that evil will eventually return to the land and the Hero will not live long enough to stop it. For their bravery, the Hero receives the title of "Erdrick" ("Loto" in the Japanese version). The Hero later vanishes from Alefgard, leaving their sword and armor to be passed down throughout the ages so that their descendants can continue to protect the world from evil.

In a post-credit scene of HD-2D Remake, the Dragon Queen's High Priest vows to take care of her child, revealing himself to be Hargon.

== Development ==
As with the other main games in the Dragon Quest series, Dragon Quest III's scenario was designed by Yuji Horii, whereas the artwork was done by Akira Toriyama, of Dragon Ball fame. Koichi Sugiyama composed all the music for Dragon Quest III. Chunsoft president Koichi Nakamura, co-creator of Dragon Quest, stated he contributed about "10%" of the games programming. The game was released a year after its predecessor, which was finished only five months after the first installment. This reflected an ever-lengthening game development process of the series according to series creator, Yuji Horii. In a 1989 interview, Horii said that developers had perfected the series' game structure in Dragon Quest III, and this was reflected by the transition from one character's quest to a party of heroes. The password system used on the first two Dragon Quest titles was dropped in favor of a save slot due in part to Horii's dislike of the long codes that players needed to memorize or record . Horii had a policy of removing any features from his games that had been used elsewhere, which turned out to be unworkable during Dragon Quest III's development when the game's world map concept was used first by another game maker in Mirai Shinwa Jarvas, but Horii's team was too far into development to change anything. Horii also preferred a silent protagonist to make the player feel like they have become the main character, but at one point in the story, Horii was forced to make the hero shout, "Leave him to us! Run! Quick!"

=== Remakes ===
Release years by platforms
Platform	JP	NA	EU
Famicom/NES	1988	1992	N/A
Super Famicom	1996	N/A	N/A
Game Boy Color	2000	2001	N/A
Cellphones	2009	N/A	N/A
Wii	2011	N/A	N/A
Android, iOS	2014		
PlayStation 4, 3DS	2017	N/A	N/A
Switch	2019		
Windows, Switch, PlayStation 5, Xbox Series X/S	2024		

A comparison of graphics from the Famicom, Super Famicom, and Game Boy Color versions, showing the hero outside of Aliahan

The Super Famicom version, released in late 1996, during the last days of the Super NES in North America, was never brought to North America, due to Enix America Corporation's closure in 1995. By the time Enix of America returned, the SNES had been discontinued in North America. However, the next remake, for the Game Boy Color, was released in both Japan and the US.

The Game Boy Color version is based on the Super Famicom version. For the North American release of the Dragon Quest III Game Boy Color remake, Enix decided to give the packaging an anime feel, due to fan demand on Enix's message boards. Both remake versions of Dragon Quest III offer many new features and changes. The game received a new translation, incorporating many adult elements that were cut from its original American release, and becoming the first Game Boy Color RPG with a "Teen" rating. It was also one of the largest Game Boy Color game released in North America, with 32 Mb ROM and 256Kb of save-state SRAM on one cartridge. A new class, the Thief, was added to the roster in each of the remakes. Many of the names of the classes were changed in the English localization of the Game Boy Color version, such as Soldier to Warrior. Also, in the new versions was the ability to change into the Jester class at Dhama, which was not allowed in the original. New mini-games were added to the remakes, including Pachisi (called Suguroku in Japan / Treasures and Trapdoors as of the Dragon Quest V remake), which is a giant board game style adventure from which the player can win items. This game is based on Horii's series Itadaki Street. The Mini Medal system, which lets players collect hidden medals to gain new items, seen in later Dragon Quest games (it originated in Dragon Quest IV), was added. Another medal system, Monster Medals, lets players collect medals from fallen enemies, was added in Game Boy Color remake, and two players could trade Monster Medals via a Game Link Cable. Two bonus dungeons become available after the main quest is over. The remakes feature updated graphics. An overhauled introduction for the game was made, similar to the one in the original Dragon Quest III, which included Ortega's battle with the Dragon Queen. Monster and attack animation in battles were added, a feature first introduced in Dragon Quest VI. A personality system was added to the remakes of Dragon Quest III. A pre-game sequence in which the player answers moral dilemmas similar to that in Ultima IV determines the Hero's personality. The personality of the other members of the party is determined by the stat-raising seeds that the player gives them during the character generation process. Personalities determine which stats increase when a character levels up. The personalities may be changed by use of special items and books.

Square Enix released both the Famicom and Super Famicom versions of Dragon Quest III in Japan on September 15, 2011, as part of Dragon Quest 25th Anniversary Collection Famicom & Super Famicom Dragon Quest I & II & III, a compilation of emulated Dragon Quest games for the Wii to celebrate the series' 25th anniversary. A quick save feature was added to these versions, allowing for pauses at any time, but the save file is deleted upon resuming.

At the Dragon Quest 35th Anniversary Livestream, a remake of Dragon Quest III was announced in the "HD-2D" style of games like Octopath Traveler and Triangle Strategy. The remake was released on November 14, 2024. A new class, the Monster Wrangler, was added to this remake.

=== Music ===
Koichi Sugiyama composed and directed the music for the game. Dragon Quest III's music is featured on Dragon Quest Game Music Super Collection Vol. 1, Dragon Quest Game Music Super Collection Vol. 2, and Dragon Quest Game Music Super Collection Vol. 3, each album a compilation of music from the first six Dragon Quest games. This game's music has also been featured on other Dragon Quest compilation albums, such as Dragon Quest on Piano Vol. II, which was released in 1990, and Dragon Quest Best Songs Selection ~Loula~, released in 1993. A compilation album of Dragon Quest III's music was put on Dragon Quest III ~And into the Legend...~ Remix Symphonic Suite and was published by Sony Records in 1996. In 2011 Sugiyama played a concert focused on Dragon Quest III in his "Family Classic Concert" series he has done for many years, playing fifteen of the games songs.

All tracks are written by Koichi Sugiyama.

Dragon Quest III: And into the Legend...
No.	Title	Length
1.	"Roto's Theme" (ロトのテーマ Roto no Tēma)
2.	"Rondo Royale" (王宮のロンド Ōkyū no Rondo)
3.	"Around the World (Around the World – Town – Jipang – Pyramid – Village)" (世界をまわる（街～ジパング～ピラミッド～村） Sekai o Mawaru (Machi ~ Jipangu ~ Piramiddo ~ Mura))
4.	"Adventure" (冒険の旅） Bōken no Tabi)
5.	"Dungeon – Tower – The Phantom Ship" (ダンジョン～塔～幽霊船） Danjon ~ Tō ~ Yūreisen)
6.	"Requiem – Small Shrine" (鎮魂歌～ほこら Chinkonka ~ Hokora)
7.	"Sailing" (海を越えて Umi o Koete)
8.	"Heavenly Flight" (おおぞらをとぶ Oozora o Tobu)
9.	"Fighting Spirits Battle Theme – In Alefgard – Hero's Challenge" (戦闘のテーマ～アレフガルドにて～勇者の挑戦 Sentō no Tēma ~ Arefugarudo nite ~ Yūsha no Chōsen)
10.	"And, into the Legend..." (そして、伝説へ... Soshite, Densetsu e...)
11.	"Dragon Quest III's Original Audio Story" (ドラゴンクエストIII ゲーム オリジナル サウンド ストーリー Doragon Kuesuto ~ Gēmu Orijinaru sutori)

== Reception ==
=== Sales ===
Dragon Quest III sold over one million copies on the first day, with almost 300 arrests for truancy among students absent from school to purchase the game. It set sales records by selling 1.1 million game cartridges in Japan within a day and 3 million in a week, and grossing ¥20 billion ($143 million at the time, or $389 million adjusted for inflation) within a month. It topped the Japanese sales charts from February, through March and April, to May 1988. It became the best-selling game of 1988 in Japan, with 3.8 million units sold, and the best-selling game in Japan between 1986 and 1989, grossing $230 million at the time. The original game sold a worldwide total of 3.895 million copies, including 3.8 million in Japan and 95,000 in the United States, grossing several hundred million dollars by 1993 ($820 million adjusted for inflation).

It is often mistakenly thought that in 1988 the game's success caused the Japanese government to outlaw further releases of Dragon Quest games on school days. In truth, Enix themselves decided to hold off the release of future Dragon Quest games until weekends. The North American release of Dragon Quest III did not meet nearly as much success. The North American release's poor sales are partly due to the fact that the game was released after the release of 16-bit gaming systems, making it seem archaic to gamers.

The Super Famicom remake sold 1.4 million units in Japan, with nearly 720,000 units sold in 1996 alone. The Game Boy Color version sold a lower 604,000 copies in Japan by the end of 2001, and eventually became the fifth best selling Game Boy Color game in Japan, with 638,551 copies sold. Together with the sales of the remakes, Dragon Quest III is the most successful title in the series and one of the best-selling role-playing games in Japan. As of November 2010, the Japan mobile phone version was downloaded more than 1,000,000 times. Wii Dragon Quest Collection sold 403,953 copies in 2011. In December 2024, Square Enix revealed that the Dragon Quest III HD-2D Remake had sold more than 2 million units worldwide. And by the time of the franchise's 40th anniversary, the Erdrick Trilogy HD-2D remakes had sold a combined 4 million copies worldwide.

=== Reviews and accolades ===
Reception

Aggregate scores
Aggregator	Score						
Aggregator	GBC	iOS	NES	NS	PC	PS5	Xbox Series X/S
GameRankings	87%	N/A	N/A	N/A	N/A	N/A	N/A
Metacritic	N/A	78/100	N/A	71/100	N/A	N/A	N/A
OpenCritic	N/A	N/A	N/A	93% recommend	93% recommend	93% recommend	93% recommend

Review scores
Publication	Score						
Publication	GBC	iOS	NES	NS	PC	PS5	Xbox Series X/S
Electronic Gaming Monthly	7/10	N/A	N/A	N/A	N/A	N/A	N/A
Famitsu	30 of 40	N/A	9/10, 10/10, 10/10, 9/10	N/A	N/A	N/A	N/A
GamePro	4/5	N/A	N/A	N/A	N/A	N/A	N/A
GameSpot	7.6/10	N/A	N/A	N/A	N/A	N/A	N/A
IGN	10/10	N/A	N/A	N/A	N/A	N/A	N/A
Nintendo Power	4/5	N/A	N/A	N/A	N/A	N/A	N/A
TouchArcade	N/A	5/5	N/A	N/A	N/A	N/A	N/A
Famicom Hisshoubon	N/A	N/A	4/5	N/A	N/A	N/A	N/A

Award
Publication	Award
Famitsu Best Hit Game Awards	Game of the Year; Best RPG; Best Character Design

Upon release, the four reviewers in Famicom Tsūshin gave the game scores of 9/10, 10/10, 10/10, and 9/10. It was the highest scored game on average from the magazine in 1988. A review in Famicom Hisshoubon said that from the story, setting and events, the game was excellent all around and that parts of the game were even more elaborate than the previous Dragon Quest game. In the 1988 Famitsu Best Hit Game Awards, Dragon Quest III won the awards for Game of the Year, Best RPG and Best Character Design. In 1989, Famitsu gave Dragon Quest III the award for the best game released since 1983. Writing for Famicom Hisshoubon, Satoshi Tajiri complimented Dragon Quest III as the most interesting software they had played in 1988, praising the refined controls and gameplay rules and its ease-of-use for new players. A survey conducted by Famitsu magazine in early 2006 among its readers placed Dragon Quest III as the third most favorite game of all time, being preceded by only Final Fantasy X and Final Fantasy VII.

In North America, Dragon Quest III was considered an improvement over the first two games, with critics finding the new day/night system and the addition of an in-game bank praiseworthy, but the game was criticized for keeping "the same ugly graphical style and clumsy interface" according to Kurt Kalata of Gamasutra. Its reputation has risen in America since its release, primarily due to its gameplay innovations, leading Nintendo Power to list it as number 176 on their Top 200 Games list. IGN later listed it as the 96th best Nintendo Entertainment System game. GamesRadar ranked it the 12th best NES game ever made. The staff chose it over the other Dragon Warrior titles due to its job system which they felt had depth and was influential to video games. In 2023, Time Extension included the game on their "Best JRPGs of All Time" list.

The Game Boy Color remake received very positive reviews from critics. GameSpot gave the Game Boy Color version a "good" 7.6/10, saying that "DWIII is a worthy port of its old NES ancestor, but its firm grounding in the RPG old-school means that only the hard-core need apply." The publication nominated the game for its annual "Best Game Boy Color Game" award, which went to Oracle of Seasons and Oracle of Ages. Nintendo Power gave the remake a 4/5, while IGN gave the game a perfect 10/10.

== Legacy ==
The male Hero from this installment appears in the Japan-exclusive mobile game Dragon Quest Rivals. He also appears as a guest character in the 2018 crossover fighting game Super Smash Bros. Ultimate via DLC and is officially voiced for the first time by Nobuyuki Hiyama. The game's director, Masahiro Sakurai, explained that the Hero's inclusion was originally meant to include just the two protagonists from Dragon Quest III and Dragon Quest XI, but the number would ultimately be doubled to four, including the protagonists from Dragon Quest IV and Dragon Quest VIII.

== Manga ==
The manga series, Dragon Quest Retsuden: Roto no Monshō (ドラゴンクエスト列伝 ロトの紋章, Dragon Quest Saga: Roto's Emblem), was written by Chiaki Kawamata and Junji Koyanagi with artwork by Kamui Fujiwara and was published in Monthly Shōnen Gangan from 1991 through 1997. The series was later compiled into for 21 volumes published by Enix; in 1994, it was released on CD and was released for the PlayStation Portable on December 11, 2009, as part of manga distribution library. In 1996, an anime movie based on the manga was released on video cassette.

A sequel series, Dragon Quest Retsuden: Roto no Monshō ~Monshō o Tsugumono-tachi e~ (ドラゴンクエスト列伝 ロトの紋章 ～紋章を継ぐ者達へ～, Dragon Quest Retsuden: Roto no Monshō - To the Children Who Inherit the Emblem), published by Square Enix started in 2005 and is still ongoing; as of December 2012, fifteen volumes have been released. The first four volumes were written by Jun Eishima and all the rest volumes written by Takashi Umemura. All of them have been supervised by Yuji Horii with artwork done by Kamui Fujiwara. Dragon Quest Retsuden: Roto no Monshō is meant to take place between Dragon Quest III and Dragon Quest.

After monsters possessed the Carmen's king for seven years, the kingdom fell to the hordes of evil. The only survivors were Prince Arus and an army General's daughter, Lunafrea. Meanwhile, in the Kingdom of Loran, a child by the name of is born with the name Jagan per the orders of Demon Lord Imagine. As Loto's descendant, Arus, along with Lunafrea, set out to defeat the monsters and restore peace to the world.

Dragon Quest Retsuden: Roto no Monshō ~Monshō o Tsugumono-tachi e~ takes place 25 years after the events in Dragon Quest Retsuden: Roto no Monshō. The world is once again in chaos and a young boy, Arosu (アロス), sets out gathering companions to once again save the world from evil. Dragon Quest Retsuden: Roto no Monshō was popular in Japan, it has sold 18 million in Japan. Its sequel Dragon Quest Retsuden: Roto no Monshō - To the Children Who Inherit the Emblem has also sold well in Japan. For the week of August 26 through September 1, 2008, volume 7 was ranked 9th in Japan having sold 59,540 copies. For the week of February 24 through March 2, 2009, volume 8 was ranked 19th in Japan having sold 76,801 copies. For the week of October 26 through November 1, 2009, volume 9 was ranked 16th in Japan having sold 40,492 copies for a total of 60,467.

== See also ==
- History of Eastern role-playing video games
