= Dragon Quest Heroes II =

2016 video game

- Developer: Omega Force
- Publisher: Square Enix
- Director: Tomohiko Sho
- Producers: Ryota Aomi; Kenichi Ogasawara
- Designer: Michio Yamada
- Programmer: Yu Ito
- Artists: Akira Toriyama; Kentaro Yamamoto; Eiichiro Nakastu
- Writer: Atsushi Narita
- Composer: Koichi Sugiyama
- Series: Dragon Quest; Dynasty Warriors
- Platforms: PlayStation 3; PlayStation 4; PlayStation Vita; Nintendo Switch; Windows
- Release: PS3, PS Vita: JP: May 27, 2016; PS4: JP: May 27, 2016; NA: April 25, 2017; EU: April 28, 2017; Switch: JP: March 3, 2017; Windows: WW: April 25, 2017
- Genres: Action role-playing, hack and slash
- Modes: Single-player, multiplayer

Dragon Quest Heroes II (Note: ドラゴンクエストヒーローズII 双子の王と予言の終わり (Doragon Kuesto Hīrōzu II: Futago no Oh to Yogen no Owari) in Japanese.) is a hack and slash game developed by Omega Force and published by Square Enix for PlayStation 3, PlayStation 4, PlayStation Vita, Nintendo Switch, and Windows. It was released in Japan in May 2016, and worldwide in April 2017. The game is a sequel to Dragon Quest Heroes: The World Tree's Woe and the Blight Below.

== Gameplay ==
Dragon Quest Heroes II mixes the hack-and-slash combat of Koei Tecmo's Dynasty Warriors series of video games with the characters, monsters, universe, and lore from Square Enix's Dragon Quest series. The game is heavier on the RPG elements than most of Omega Force's other titles. World exploration was changed to resemble the typical Dragon Quest experience. Players can move their party to visit towns, wander the world map and initiate battle stages (similar to dungeons). Seamless random monster encounters may break up the pace between locations. Special ingredients and treasure boxes can be discovered across the world map. Weather can fluctuate and sometimes affect the party's status.

Characters are able to dash to wherever they please, but certain areas are blocked until the player proceeds with the main story. As the players proceed with the main story, they can unlock Zoomstones on the world map. These monuments allow the party to instantly warp to previously visited locations.

Accordia acts as the new main town. One major change from the previous game's features is the class change feature for the main protagonists Lazarel and Teresa. Switching classes changes equipment types and potential skills for each protagonist. Known classes include martial artist, mage, monk, thief and warrior. A new Martial Master can teach new weapon skills to the protagonist, depending on their proficiency with each weapon type. Individual weapons and outfits have all been changed to only provide aesthetic changes. Accessories can still be strengthened to alter stats.

Battle stages are mandatory for progressing the main story and behave like battle areas from the previous title. Parties can still be changed by talking to Patty in her bar. Two player co-op is now available for the main story by selecting the "Assist" option in the main battle menu.

Alternatively, players can work together to complete the new "Time-Space Labyrinth", a series of multiplayer exclusive stages aiming to appeal to longtime Dragon Quest fans. It is unlocked by finding labyrinth map pieces scattered throughout the main story. Erinn can be spoken to in the town inn to set up online matching or send invites.

Up to four players can play together for multiplayer missions. Online chat is not available, but players can select common stock phrases to communicate. Fallen party members can either be resurrected by Yggdrasil Leaves or raise their alive companions' health and Tension by cheering for them. Players can work together to find more map pieces or defeat difficult bosses. Metal Slimes have a higher chance of appearing in these missions.

Cross-platform play options and save data sharing are present. Having save data from the previous title grants Luceus and Aurora costumes for Lazarel and Teresa. Dragon Quest Builders save data grants "Builders Mallet" for the protagonists' use.

== Plot ==
The story takes place in the Seven Realms, multiple kingdoms which surround the capital of Accordia. One thousand years prior to the start of the game, the Seven Realms were locked in a brutal war that was brought to an end by the wisdom of a great king named Unos, and his descendants would continue to maintain this peace to the present day.

In the port kingdom of Harba, cousins Lazarel and Teresa (the main protagonists) fend off a sudden and unprovoked invasion from the neighboring kingdom of Dunisia, where their friend Prince Cesar lives. Accompanied by Desdemona, royal guard to the King of Accordia, the cousins travel to Dunisia to confront Cesar, who blames the king of Harba for the murder of his father, the king of Dunisia. The matter is taken to the King of Accordia, who suggests that the four of them launch an investigation into the realm of Ingenia to find the true murderer. Despite being imprisoned under the false pretense of being the assassins themselves by the queen of Ingenia due to her being given an anonymous tip she was being targeted next for murder, they convince the queen to join the inquiry into who wanted to have the kingdoms/realms descend into war once more to fulfill an ancient prophecy.

During their travels, Lazarel and Teresa cross paths with various heroes who claim to have come from other worlds (the worlds of past Dragon Quest games), such as Torneko, and the sisters Maya and Meena. They agree to accompany the cousins as they investigate the growing discontent throughout the Seven Realms, culminating in a full-scale war with the Kings of the Beastlands. After a long and arduous battle, a cease-fire is finally reached and Accordia celebrates the end of the war.

The King of Accordia suddenly appears, accompanied by whom appears to be his twin brother, and declares that humankind is to be sentenced to death. Lazarel and Teresa confront the Kings in Accordia's castle and fight them until one of the twins kills the other. The "twin" is revealed to be Fractos, Unos's brother who triggered the war 1,000 years ago and manipulated all the recent events (among them killing Cesar's father) so he could plunge the world into darkness. During the chaos, Lazarel and Teresa realize that they are not cousins as originally thought, but twin siblings and descendants of Unos. Joining their power together, they destroy Fractos and later become the new rulers of Accordia.

== Development ==
Dragon Quest Heroes II was developed by Omega Force, who are better known for their Dynasty Warriors hack and slash series. Dragon Quest series creator Yuji Horii stated he wanted to have more playable characters in Dragon Quest Heroes II than the first title had. The voice acting was done by the same people as the first title, and two also voiced their respective characters in Dragon Quest VIII.

In an interview, series producer Ryota Aomi detailed feedback about the original game, and it was distilled down to requests for multiplayer, a more "adventurous" battlefield, and the ability to change jobs. Dragon Quest Heroes I·II, a compilation featuring both games in the series, was released as a Japanese launch title for the Nintendo Switch in March 2017.

== Reception ==
Reception

Aggregate scores
Aggregator	Score
Metacritic	PS4: 76/100
OpenCritic	63% recommend (Note: Based on 72 reviews)

Review scores
Publication	Score
Destructoid	7.5/10
Famitsu	39/40
Game Informer	7.5/10
GameSpot	8/10
IGN	7.5/10

More than 580,000 copies of the game were sold in Japan. Game Informer praised the graphics and the controls, but noted the game's thin plot and repetitive gameplay. IGN was more complimentary, praising the improved story over the original, and praising changes to the combat system, but not enjoying the addition of further RPG elements to the game. GameSpot loved the open areas being paired with more intense story-driven "war zones", and further enjoyed online multiplayer for letting players encounter very powerful monsters to team up against. Polygon stated that the game was not great at either combat or its RPG elements, citing slow enemies and uninteresting quests. Destructoid called the game an improvement over the original Dragon Quest Heroes, noting that there is more exploration freedom than before, but saying there are not enough interesting things to do in the open world or "points of interest". Famitsu awarded it four scores of 10, 10, 9 and 10, which equaled a total of 39 out of 40.
