= Dragon Quest Heroes: The World Tree's Woe and the Blight Below =

2015 video game

- Developer: Omega Force
- Publisher: Square Enix
- Director: Tomohiko Sho
- Producers: Ryota Aomi; Kenichi Ogasawara
- Designer: Michio Yamada
- Programmer: Yu Ito
- Artists: Akira Toriyama; Kentaro Yamamoto; Eiichiro Nakastu
- Writer: Atsushi Narita
- Composer: Koichi Sugiyama
- Series: Dragon Quest; Dynasty Warriors
- Platforms: PlayStation 3 PlayStation 4 Microsoft Windows; Nintendo Switch
- Release: PlayStation 3: JP: February 26, 2015; PlayStation 4: JP: February 26, 2015; NA: October 13, 2015; EU: October 16, 2015; Microsoft Windows: WW: December 3, 2015; Nintendo Switch: JP: March 3, 2017
- Genres: Hack and slash, Action role-playing
- Mode: Single-player

Dragon Quest Heroes: The World Tree's Woe and the Blight Below (Note: Known in Japanese as ドラゴンクエストヒーローズ 闇竜と世界樹の城 (Doragon Kuesto Hīrōzu Yamiryuu to Sekaiju no Shiro, lit. "Dragon Quest Heroes: The Dark Dragon and the World Tree Castle")) is a hack and slash game developed by Omega Force and published by Square Enix. It was released for PlayStation 3 and PlayStation 4 in Japan in February 2015, and in North America, Australia and Europe only for PlayStation 4 in October 2015. It was later released for Microsoft Windows in December 2015. The game received generally positive reviews, with a sequel Dragon Quest Heroes II being released in Japan during May 2016. Dragon Quest Heroes would later be released with the sequel in a compilation for Nintendo Switch in Japan.

== Gameplay ==
Dragon Quest Heroes mixes the hack-and-slash combat of Koei Tecmo's Dynasty Warriors series of video games with the characters, monsters, universe, and lore from Square Enix's Dragon Quest series. The game is much more heavy on RPG elements than most of Omega Force's other titles. The game has a roster of 13 characters that the player can choose from, each having unique weapons and abilities, some of these characters are fan favourite Dragon Quest characters but many other characters show up as NPCs.

== Plot ==
The game is set in the Kingdom of Arba where mankind and monsters live peacefully under the rule of King Doric. One day, monsters began to attack mankind suddenly leading co-captains of the Royal Guard, Luceus and Aurora, to recover the hearts of monsters. The nefarious Velasco schemes to plunge the world into darkness by taking control of all the monsters in order to release the darkness dragon Shadroth: Lord of the Night.

When a dark shockwave sweeps through the city of Arba, the monsters that once lived alongside the people in peace are driven into a frenzied rage. As either the hero Luceus or the heroine Aurora, the player joins forces with Doric and a cast of fan favorites from previous Dragon Quest titles, such as Alena, Bianca and Yangus, to bring the rampaging hordes of monsters to their senses and restore order to the kingdom.

== Development ==
Dragon Quest Heroes was developed by Omega Force, who are better known for their hack and slash Dynasty Warriors franchise, and published by Square Enix.

At a Sony Computer Entertainment Japan press conference on September 1, 2014, the game was announced by Yuji Horii. As a promotion, a special edition PlayStation 4, featuring the metal slime from Dragon Quest, was released on December 11, 2014, selling 38,000 units in its first week.

== Reception ==
Reception

Aggregate scores
Aggregator	Score
Metacritic	PS4: 77/100; PC: 73/100
OpenCritic	57% recommend (Note: Based on 64 reviews)

Review score
Publication	Score
Famitsu	35/40

Famitsu awarded Dragon Quest Heroes a 35/40. More than 594,000 copies were sold in its first week, 325,000 on PS3 and 269,000 on PS4. Dragon Quest Heroes is currently the second best selling PS4 game in Japan, and the first not including hardware bundles. In July 2015, Square Enix announced that they will release more Dragon Quest video games in the West if the company is satisfied with the sales of Heroes. On July 28, 2015, Square Enix announced that the title had sold more than one million units.

In the west, Dragon Quest Heroes received a mostly positive reception, with an average Metacritic score of 77 out of 100 (75 reviews) for the PS4 version, and 73 out of 100 (9 reviews) for the PC version.

IGN awarded it a score of 6.2 out of 10, saying "The joy of fighting defenseless creatures in Dragon Quest Heroes only lasts a short while." GameSpot awarded it a score of 8.0 out of 10, saying "affords every lover of the franchise the rare opportunity to cause genocidal destruction with the kind of efficiency you cannot find in a turn-based RPG."

== Sequel ==
As the game received positive reception, Square Enix announced that they would be developing a sequel for the game, titled Dragon Quest Heroes II. It was released for the PlayStation 3, PlayStation 4, and PlayStation Vita in Japan on May 27, 2016, and for the PlayStation 4 in North America and Europe in April 2017.

Dragon Quest Heroes I·II, a compilation featuring this game and the sequel, was released as a Japanese launch title for the Nintendo Switch on March 3, 2017.
