= Music of the Chocobo series =

Music from the Chocobo video game series

The Chocobo video game series is a spin-off series composed of over a dozen games developed by Square Co. and later by Square Enix featuring a super deformed version of the Chocobo, a Final Fantasy series mascot and fictional bird, as the protagonist. Several of the titles have received separate album releases of music from the game. The music of the Chocobo series includes soundtrack albums for the Chocobo's Mysterious Dungeon sub-series—comprising Chocobo's Mysterious Dungeon, Chocobo's Dungeon 2, and Final Fantasy Fables: Chocobo's Dungeon—and soundtrack albums of music from Chocobo Racing, Final Fantasy Fables: Chocobo Tales, and Chocobo and the Magic Picture Book: The Witch, The Maiden, and the Five Heroes, as well as an album of arranged music from Chocobo's Mysterious Dungeon and a single entitled Chocobo no Fushigina Dungeon Toki Wasure No Meikyuu: Door Crawl for the theme song of Final Fantasy Fables: Chocobo's Dungeon.

The first album of the discography released was the soundtrack to Chocobo's Mysterious Dungeon, Chocobo no Fushigina Dungeon Original Soundtrack. It was released by DigiCube in 1997 and was reprinted by Square Enix in 2006. An arranged album of music from that game was released in under the title Chocobo no Fushigina Dungeon Coi Vanni Gialli by DigiCube in 1998, and soundtrack albums to Chocobo's Dungeon 2 and Chocobo Racing were released the following year, also by DigiCube. There were no further album releases in the series until 2006, when Square Enix produced a download-only soundtrack to Final Fantasy Fables: Chocobo Tales. The latest releases in the series are the soundtrack to Final Fantasy Fables: Chocobo's Dungeon and a combined soundtrack for Chocobo Tales and The Witch, The Maiden, and the Five Heroes, both of which were released by Square Enix in 2008.

== Concept and creation ==
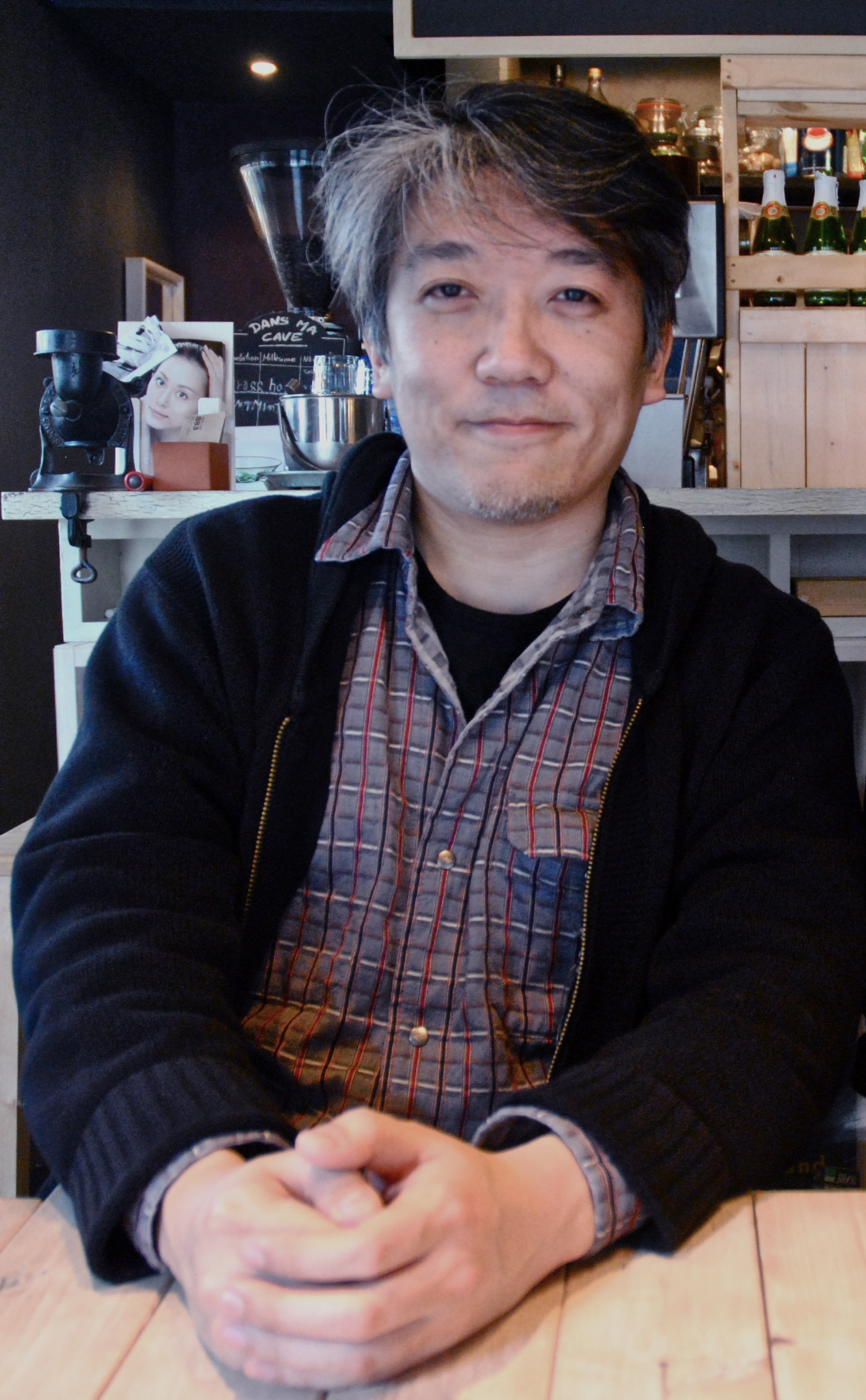
Masashi Hamauzu in 2012

Masashi Hamauzu, the composer for Chocobo's Mysterious Dungeon, was not expecting to be assigned the soundtrack to the game. In the liner notes for the original soundtrack album, he states that he was "still in high school when that lovable character first made his debut in Final Fantasy", but that the "Chocobo Theme" made a big impression on him, leading him to often think to himself that he would "love to try doing this kind of work". The soundtrack was the first solo album that Hamauzu had produced. When he wrote his own Chocobo themes for the Chocobo no Fushigina Dungeon Original Soundtrack, he decided to arrange the opening and ending of the album for a fifty-piece orchestra, which lead to the creation of the orchestrated Chocobo no Fushigina Dungeon Coi Vanni Gialli album. In the liner notes for that album, he explains that his motivation for creating the orchestral works was because "demand for classical music in Japan is still low compared with other countries" and he wanted "to spread the word on this style of music by any means necessary". He ends the note by exhorting his listeners to "take your time" with classical music such as the album, so that one day they will appreciate it.

Hamauzu has not been involved in the production of any other Chocobo soundtracks. Chocobo's Dungeon 2's soundtrack was composed by a group of five composers, and was the last Chocobo game soundtrack to not be mainly composed of remixes of previous Final Fantasy and Chocobo music. Hamauzu was not involved in the creation of either the remixes or original tracks for these albums. His role was filled by Kumi Tanioka for Final Fantasy Fables: Chocobo's Dungeon, Kenji Ito for Chocobo Racing, and Yuzo Takahashi for Chocobo and the Magic Picture Book: The Witch, The Maiden, and the Five Heroes.

Unlike the soundtracks to the numbered Final Fantasy games, no tracks from the Chocobo soundtracks have appeared in any compilation albums produced by Square Enix. Pieces from the series have also not appeared in any of the official Final Fantasy music concerts, although a piece based on the "Chocobo theme", "Swing de Chocobo", has been played at the 2005 More Friends concert in Los Angeles, the 2006 Voices concert in Japan, and in the worldwide Distant Worlds concert tour from 2007 to date. On February 6, 2011 the Australian Eminence Symphony Orchestra played a concert in Tokyo as part of the Game Music Laboratory concert series as a tribute to the music of Kenji Ito and Hiroki Kikuta. The concert included "Treasure Chest of the Heart" from Chocobo Racing, sung by Jillian Aversa.

== Albums ==
=== Chocobo's Mysterious Dungeon ===
The Chocobos's Mysterious Dungeon games are a series of roguelike dungeon crawls and are part of the Fushigi no Dungeon, or Mystery Dungeon series. The three games in the Chocobos's Mysterious Dungeon series are Chocobo's Mysterious Dungeon (チョコボの不思議なダンジョン, Chocobo no Fushigina Dungeon) which was only released in Japan, Chocobo's Mysterious Dungeon 2 (チョコボの不思議なダンジョン2, Chocobo no Fushigina Dungeon 2), titled Chocobo's Dungeon 2 in North America, and Chocobo's Mysterious Dungeon: the Labyrinth of Forgotten Time (チョコボの不思議なダンジョン 時忘れの迷宮, Chokobo no Fushigi na Danjon Toki Wasure no Meikyū), released as Final Fantasy Fables: Chocobo's Dungeon in North America. Each of the three games had a soundtrack album release, while Chocobo no Fushigina Dungeon additionally sparked an orchestral arrangement album subtitled Coi Vanni Gialli and Final Fantasy Fables: Chocobo's Dungeon additionally had a single release of its theme song titled Door Crawl.

==== Chocobo no Fushigina Dungeon Original Soundtrack ====
Chocobo no Fushigina Dungeon Original Soundtrack

Soundtrack album by Masashi Hamauzu
- Released: December 21, 1997; February 1, 2006 (reprint)
- Recorded: Sound City, Tokyo, Japan
- Genre: Video game music
- Length: 71:37
- Label: DigiCube; Square Enix (reprint)

Chocobo no Fushigina Dungeon Original Soundtrack is the soundtrack for Chocobo's Mysterious Dungeon. It contains all of the tracks from the game, and was composed by Masashi Hamauzu and released by DigiCube on December 21, 1997, with a re-release by Square Enix on February 1, 2006. The album included a bonus mini-CD containing two orchestral arrangements of the main theme. Both the opening and ending themes of the soundtrack are orchestrated, while the rest of the tracks use a synthesizer; the tracks have been described as "very upbeat" and "fun-lovin' light-hearted". Five of the tracks incorporate the "Chocobo Theme" from the Final Fantasy series as part of the theme, namely "Chocobo's House", "Chocobo Village", "After the Battle", "Let's Have a Dream", and "Courage". The release spans two discs, including the bonus mini-CD, and has a duration of 1:11:37.

Chocobo no Fushigina Dungeon Original Soundtrack was well received by critics; Patrick Gann of RPGFan praised it, saying that it could be "some of the most creative musical work to come from Squaresoft" and that the album was full of "very upbeat and fun-lovin' light-hearted goodness from Hamauzu". He especially liked the included mini-CD, claiming that it made the album "a worthwhile purchase on its own". Kero Hazel of Square Enix Music Online agreed, terming the album a "solid winner" and praising its ability to be enjoyed both as background music and with active listening. Hazel also praised Hamauzu's "flexible" use of the "Chocobo" theme. Dave of Square Enix Music Online, however, while still recommending the album as a "good score", felt that the lighter themes of the soundtrack were lacking in depth, leaving the darker themes to "provide the listener with any substance".

Track list

Disc 1
No.	Title	Japanese title	Length
1.	"Prelude (Orchestra Version)"	プレリュード(オーケストラ・ヴァージョン) PURERYUUDO (OOKESUTORA VAASHON)	1:17
2.	"Beginning of a Journey"	旅のはじまり Tabi no hajimari	1:40
3.	"Chocobo's House"	チョコボのお家 CHOKOBO no ouchi	0:46
4.	"The First Dungeon"	はじめてのダンジョン Hajimete no DANJON	2:23
5.	"A Mystery"	謎 Nazo	2:17
6.	"Searching for the Illusionary Item"	幻のアイテムを求めて Maboroshi no AITEMU o motomete	2:31
7.	"Whisper of the Water"	水のささやき Mizu no sasayaki	2:01
8.	"Chocobo Village"	チョコボの村 CHOKOBO no mura	3:02
9.	"Fat Chocobo"	太っちょチョコボ Futoccho CHOKOBO	0:22
10.	"Shopkeeper"	倉庫屋さん Sōkoyasan	2:12
11.	"I Don't Know Which Way to Go"	右も左もわからない Migi mo hidari mo wakaranai	2:18
12.	"Wooden Room"	木造りの部屋 Kizukuri no heya	2:24
13.	"Scythe Man is Coming!"	死神現る! Shinigami arawaru!	1:26
14.	"Let's Go Underground"	いざ 地の底へ Iza chi no soko e	2:35
15.	"Challenge"	挑戦 Chōsen	2:00
16.	"After the Battle"	戦いの後に Tatakai no nochi ni	3:09
17.	"A Brief Rest"	つかの間の休息 Tsuka no aida no kyūsoku	0:38
18.	"Searching for You"	君をさがして Kimi o sagashite	2:44
19.	"The Unknown Place"	未知の空間 Michi no kūkan	2:04
20.	"Unresting Wings"	休まない翼 Yasumanai tsubasa	2:13
21.	"Atora's Theme"	アトラのテーマ ATORA no TEEMA	2:36
22.	"Your Subject of Research?"	研究テーマは? Kenkyū TEEMA wa?	2:04
23.	"Let's Have a Dream"	夢をみようよ Yume o miyō yo	2:47
24.	"God's Errand"	神の使い Kami no tsukai	2:42
25.	"World of Darkness"	闇の世界 Yami no sekai	2:16
26.	"Steel Warrior"	鋼鉄の戦士 Kōtetsu no senshi	3:01
27.	"Where We Reached"	たどりついたところ Tadoritsuita tokoro	2:28
28.	"Courage"	勇気 Yūki	1:03
29.	"Fight, Chocobo!"	戦え チョコボ! Tatakae CHOKOBO!	2:55
30.	"Finale (Orchestra Version)"	フィナーレ(オーケストラ・ヴァージョン) FINAARE (OOKESUTORA VAASHON)	2:35

Bonus disc
No.	Title	Japanese title	Length
1.	"Chocobo's Merry Christmas"	チョコボのハッピークリスマス CHOKOBO no HAPPII KURISUMASU	3:09
2.	"C/W:Dreams on Wings"	C/W:翼に夢を C/W: tsubasa ni yume o	3:59

==== Chocobo no Fushigina Dungeon Coi Vanni Gialli ====
Chocobo no Fushigina Dungeon Coi Vanni Gialli is an arranged album of music from Chocobo's Mysterious Dungeon. The subtitle "Coi Vanni Gialli" is archaic Italian and means "With the Yellow Wings". The album, composed by Masashi Hamauzu, is composed of 11 orchestral arrangements of pieces from the Chocobo no Fushigina Dungeon soundtrack. The pieces have been described as ranging from "fast paced and exciting" to "cute little music box-esque adaptation[s]". The album was released by DigiCube on February 5, 1998, and spans 40:52 with its 11 tracks.

Like the original soundtrack, Chocobo no Fushigina Dungeon Coi Vanni Gialli was well received by critics. Damian Thomas of RPGFan called it "a wonderful soundtrack, blending both cuteness and energy" and claimed that "none of the tracks on this CD fall short of excellence". Chris of Square Enix Music Online said that there was "very little to criticize about the album" and quoted the liner notes of the album in saying that the album was "the debut of a composer of genius". He recommended the album as a good introduction to new listeners of Hamauzu's music, while also stating that "one cannot possibly be a comprehensive Hamauzu fan without listening to it". The album was also recommended by Dave of Square Enix Music Online as superior to the original soundtrack.

Track list
No.	Title	English translation	Length
1.	"Prologue"	"Prologue"	0:22
2.	"Wodan"	"Fight! Chocobo"	4:07
3.	"La Nymphe"	"Whisper of the Water"	4:38
4.	"In Dem Untergrund"	"In Search of the Mysterious Item"	3:46
5.	"The Action"	"The First Dungeon"	3:53
6.	"L'illusion"	"Unresting Wings"	3:56
7.	"Theme M"	"Chocobo Village"	2:46
8.	"Le Petit Prince"	"Atora's Theme"	3:55
9.	"La Prorhétie"	"Riddle"	3:36
10.	"La Magie"	"Searching For You"	3:56
11.	"Coi Vanni Gialli"	"After the Battle"	5:57

==== Chocobo's Dungeon 2 ====
Chocobo no Fushigina Dungeon 2 Original Soundtrack is the soundtrack for Chocobo's Dungeon 2. It was composed by Kumi Tanioka, Yasuhiro Kawakami, Tsuyoshi Sekito, and Kenji Ito, with reprises from Nobuo Uematsu. It was released by DigiCube on January 21, 1999. The album contains all of the tracks from the game, as well as two tracks used in television commercials for Chocobo's Dungeon 2. The album has been described as "light-hearted", with "no real driving songs". The album is 45 tracks on only one disc, and has a duration of 1:05:40.

Chocobo no Fushigina Dungeon 2 Original Soundtrack was moderately well received by reviewers. Patrick Gann said that despite the flaws of the game, the soundtrack "held strong" and claimed that anyone could enjoy the album, "given the right atmosphere". Chris of Square Enix Music Online termed it "a decent effort" and a "coherent and thorough work". He especially praised the contributions of Sekito and Ito, though he termed the tracks from Kawakami and Tanioka "unmemorable". He concluded that while there were no poor tracks on the album, several of the themes were "limited thematically and emotionally" and he could not recommend the soundtrack to a wide audience.

Track list
No.	Title	Japanese title	Length
1.	"Prelude ~ Premonition of a New Journey"	序曲〜新たな旅立ちの予感 Jokyoku ~ Arata na Tabidachi no Yokan	2:26
2.	"Dungeon Discovery!"	ダンジョン発見 Danjon Hakken	0:56
3.	"Treasure Hunting!"	お宝さがし！ Otakara Sagashi	2:08
4.	"Shiroma's Theme"	シロマのテーマ Shiroma no Tēma	1:29
5.	"Good Night"	おやすみ Oyasumi	0:07
6.	"Fat Chocobo's Theme"	デブチョコボのテーマ Debuchokobo no Tēmu	1:49
7.	"I'm not Afraid!"	こわくなんかないさっ Kowaku Nanka Nai Sa	2:08
8.	"Skull Hammer"	スカルハンマー Sukaru Hanmā	1:12
9.	"Whisper of Time"	時のささやき Toki no Sasayaki	1:49
10.	"Partner Moogle"	あいぼうモーグリ Aibou Mōguri	1:19
11.	"Monster Village (Version 1)"	モンスター村 (ヴァージョン１) Monsutā Mura (Vājon 1)	1:08
12.	"Enter Cid Tank!"	登場！シドタンク Tōjō! Shido Tanku	0:36
13.	"Mechanical World"	機械じかけのせかい Kikai Jikake no Sekai	2:18
14.	"Cid's Theme"	シドのテーマ Shido no Tēma	0:55
15.	"Old Cid's Castle"	シドおじさんのお城 Shido Ojisan no Oshiro	2:51
16.	"Spirit of Truth"	真実の言霊 Shinjitsu no Kotodama	1:57
17.	"Imp Robo Boss"	インプロボボス Inpu Robo Bosu	1:52
18.	"Advance!? Cid Mariner"	進め!?シドマリナー Susume!? Shido Marinā	1:28
19.	"Story of the Bottom of the Sea"	海の底の物語 Umi no Soko no Monogatari	2:23
20.	"Illusionary Place"	幻の空間 Maboroshi no Kūkan	2:05
21.	"Time of Trial"	試練の時 Shiren no Toki	2:03
22.	"Mysterious Corridor"	なぞの回廊 Nazo no Kairō	1:22
23.	"Theme of Love (Piano Solo)"	愛のテーマ (ピアノ・ソロ) Ai no Tēma	1:37
24.	"Orthros"	オルトロス Orutorosu	1:48
25.	"Wind of an Unexplored Region"	秘境の風 Hikyō no Kaze	1:22
26.	"Monster Village (Version 2)"	モンスター村 (ヴァージョン２) Monsutā Mura (Vājon 2)	1:09
27.	"Full of Interesting Things"	おもしろいものいっぱい Omoshiroi Mono Ippai	1:52
28.	"Snow Field"	ゆきのはら Yuki no Hara	2:01
29.	"Time of Sorrow"	悲しみの時 Kanashimi no Toki	1:34
30.	"Glass Goth"	グラスゴス Gurasu Gosu	1:39
31.	"Theme of Love"	愛のテーマ Ai no Tēma	1:24
32.	"Strongest Impact"	最強インパクト Saikyō Inpakuto	0:28
33.	"Monster Village (Version 3)"	モンスター村 (ヴァージョン３) Monsutā Mura (Vājon 3)	1:14
34.	"Eek!"	きゃー！ Kyā!	0:58
35.	"Raise..."	あらら‥‥ Arara.....	0:07
36.	"Charge!!"	突撃!! Totsugeki	2:00
37.	"The Last Prelude"	さいごの序曲 Saigo no Jokyoku	0:11
38.	"Glass Goth X ~ Glass Goth Z"	グラスゴスＸ〜グラスゴスＺ Gurasu Gosu X ~ Gurasugosu Z	1:35
39.	"Illusion Destruction"	幻影崩壊 Gen'ei Hōkai	0:17
40.	"Meeting Shiroma Again"	シロマとの再会 Shiroma to no Saikai	0:51
41.	"The Journey Continues"	旅は続くよ Tabi wa Tsuzuku yo	0:59
42.	"Staff Roll"	スタッフロール Sutaffu Rōru	1:02
43.	"March de Chocobo"	マーチ・デ・チョコボ Māchi de Chokobo	1:24
44.	"TVCM part1"	ＴＶＣＭ ｐａｒｔ１	1:48
45.	"TVCM part2 ~Charge!!~"	ＴＶＣＭ ｐａｒｔ２〜突撃!! TVCM part 2 ~ Totsugeki	1:59

==== Final Fantasy Fables: Chocobo's Dungeon ====
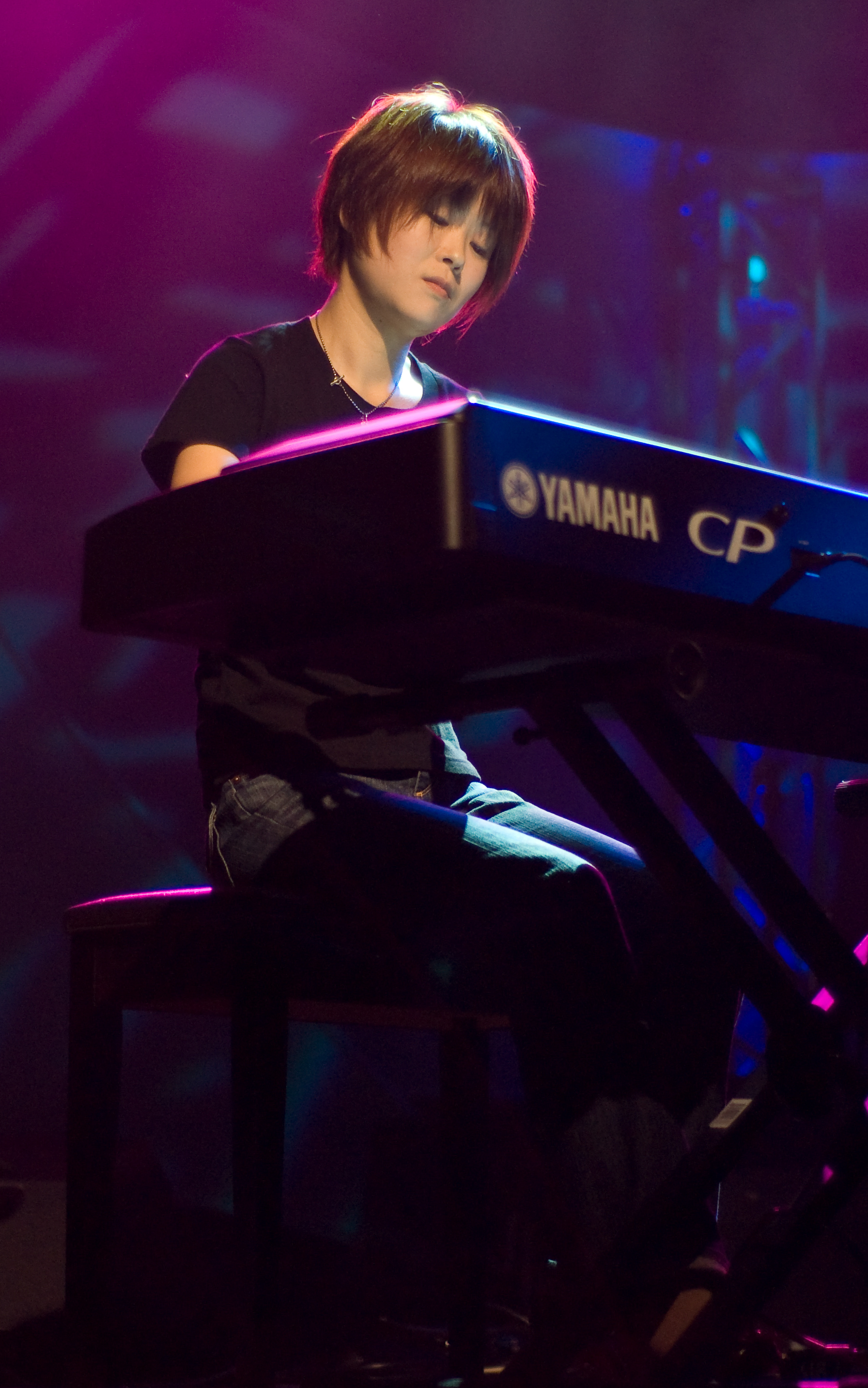
Kumi Tanioka composed the original tracks for Final Fantasy Fables: Chocobo's Dungeon and helped compose Chocobo's Dungeon 2.

Chocobo no Fushigina Dungeon Toki Wasure No Meikyū Original Soundtrack is the soundtrack for Final Fantasy Fables: Chocobo's Dungeon (チョコボの不思議なダンジョン 時忘れの迷宮, Chokobo no Fushigi na Danjon Toki Wasure no Meikyū; lit. Chocobo's Mysterious Dungeon: The Labyrinth of Forgotten Time), which features remixes of various Final Fantasy music. It was arranged by Yuzo Takahashi of Joe Down Studio, a Hokkaido-based music development studio. The title track and opening theme—both original to the soundtrack—were composed by Kumi Tanioka, while the final track "Door Crawl" was written and sung by Ai Kawashima. Other composers whose works were used are Nobuo Uematsu, Naoshi Mizuta, Masashi Hamauzu, Junya Nakano, and Kenji Ito. The album was released by Square Enix on January 23, 2008 with the catalog number SQEX-10104.

The album was well received by critics such as Jeriaska of RPGFan, who enjoyed the arrangements, particularly those of pieces from games early in the Final Fantasy series. He praised Joe Down Studios for not falling into the trap of "introducing a veneer of self-importance" that he felt was common in remakes of early Final Fantasy pieces. Chris of Square Enix Music Online also liked the album, saying that the arrangements "make many tracks sound better than they've ever sounded before". His largest complaint about the album was that it does not include every track from the game, some of which he was interested in hearing. He ascribed the exclusions to the publisher's desire to release the soundtrack as a single disc, and concluded that the album was still a "very enjoyable overall experience".

"Door Crawl", the theme song of Chocobo's Dungeon, was released as a single entitled Chocobo no Fushigina Dungeon Toki Wasure No Meikyuu: Door Crawl. The album was released by Toshiba EMI on December 12, 2007. It has a length of 14:18, and contains three tracks. The title track, "Door Crawl" (ドアクロール), is joined by "Colorless Thing" (色のないもの, "Iro no Nai Mono") and "Light" (灯, "Tomoshibi"), both unrelated to Chocobo's Dungeon. The disc was Kawashima's 15th single; it reached #20 on the Oricon Weekly Charts and sold 6,520 copies in its first week. The single sold 10,251 copies, grossing approximately ¥13,285,296 ($166,502). Lex of Square Enix Music Online had mixed feelings about the single, saying that "Door Crawl" was "a pleasant and laid back listen", but that "Colorless Thing" was "nothing special" and that "Light" was "ruined" by the synth instruments.

Track list
No.	Title	Japanese title	Length
1.	"Labyrinth of Forgotten Time"	時忘れの迷宮	2:24
2.	"Opening"	オープニング	2:17
3.	"Theme of Treasure Hunter" ("Hunter's Chance" (Final Fantasy IX))	トレジャーハンターのテーマ	2:27
4.	"Stella Ranch" ("Farm Boy" (Final Fantasy VII))	ステラ牧場	2:03
5.	"Ranch at Night" ("Rydia" (Final Fantasy IV))	牧場の夜	2:38
6.	"Town of Forgotten Time" ("Tarutaru Male" (Final Fantasy XI))	時忘れの街	1:39
7.	"Town at Night" ("Epitaph" (Final Fantasy VI))	街の夜	1:56
8.	"Theme of Shirma" ("City Theme" (Final Fantasy I))	シロマのテーマ	1:05
9.	"Open Memory" ("Prelude" (Final Fantasy XI))	記憶の解放	1:58
10.	"Theme of Dungeon Hero X" ("The Man with the Machine Gun" (Final Fantasy VIII))	ダンジョンヒーローXのテーマ	3:31
11.	"Theme of the Airship" ("The Big Whale" (Final Fantasy IV))	飛空艇のテーマ	1:42
12.	"Memory of a Distant Day" ("My Home, Sweet Home" (Final Fantasy V))	遠い日の記憶	2:12
13.	"Memory of the World" ("The Fierce Battle" (Final Fantasy VI))	世界の記憶	1:36
14.	"Together Forever" ("The Day Will Come" (Final Fantasy V))	ずーっと一緒だよ	2:24
15.	"Mog House X" ("Theme of the Four Old Men" (Final Fantasy III))	モグハウスX	0:55
16.	"Fragment of Memory" ("Over That Hill" (Final Fantasy IX))	記憶のかけら	2:30
17.	"Nostalgia" ("Chaos' Temple" (Final Fantasy))	ノスタルジア	1:24
18.	"Guardian of Flame 1" ("Sealed Away" (Final Fantasy V))	炎の守護者1	1:09
19.	"Guardian of Water 2" ("Dungeon (Fate in Haze)" (Final Fantasy V))	水の守護者2	2:43
20.	"Guardian of Light 1" ("Thunder Plains" (Final Fantasy X))	光の守護者1	2:08
21.	"Guardian of Darkness 2" ("Awakening" (Final Fantasy XI))	闇の守護者2	4:34
22.	"Duel Room" ("Force Your Way" (Final Fantasy VIII))	デュエルルーム	2:20
23.	"Phoenix Battle" ("Battle 2" (Final Fantasy III))	フェニックス戦	1:48
24.	"Leviathan Battle" ("Battle with the Four Fiends" (Final Fantasy IV))	リヴァイアサン戦	3:27
25.	"Alexander Battle" ("Summoned Beast Battle" (Final Fantasy X))	アレクサンダー戦	4:01
26.	"Croma Battle" ("Only a Plank Between One and Perdition" (Final Fantasy VIII))	クロマ戦	1:37
27.	"Raffaello Battle" ("Clash on the Big Bridge" (Final Fantasy V))	ラファエロ戦	3:08
28.	"Last Battle" ("The Decisive Battle" (Final Fantasy V))	ラストバトル	3:40
29.	"Ending" ("The World's Tomorrow" (Chocobo Racing))	エンディング	3:30
30.	"Pop-up Duel" ("Battle Scene 1" (Final Fantasy II))	ポップアップデュエル	2:21
31.	"Door Crawl"	ドアクロール	4:53

=== Chocobo Racing ===
Chocobo Racing Original Soundtrack is the soundtrack for Chocobo Racing (チョコボレーシング 〜幻界へのロード〜, Chokobo Rēshingu ~Genkai e no Rōdo~; lit. "Chocobo Racing: Road to the Spirit World") composed by Kenji Ito. First released by DigiCube on March 25, 1999, it was later re-released by Square Enix on October 1, 2008. The album is 30 tracks and 57:00 long. The only original theme in the soundtrack is "Treasure Chest of the Heart", a Japanese song orchestrated by Shirō Hamaguchi and performed by Hiromi Ohta. In the English version of the game, it is performed by Vicki Bell. The remaining tracks are arrangements of Final Fantasy tracks. The predominant theme to the tracks selected is the Chocobo theme from the Final Fantasy series, with eight of the tracks based on it. The album was appreciated by Kie of Square Enix Music Online, who felt that Ito's "arrangements of classic themes are done with great skill". He especially liked "Mithril Mines" and "Treasure Chest of the Heart", but felt that many of the tracks did not match up to the quality of the best few.

Track list
No.	Title	Japanese title	Length
1.	"Dash de Chocobo ~ Opening Movie" (Chocobo theme (Final Fantasy))	ダッシュ DE チョコボ	1:07
2.	"Choose a Chocobo ~ Chocobo Choosin'" (Chocobo theme (Final Fantasy))	えらんでチョコボ	0:49
3.	"Chocobo's Theme ~ Chocobo's Tune" (Chocobo theme (Final Fantasy))	チョコボのテーマ	1:45
4.	"Cid's Theme ~ Cid's Sonata" ("Hey Cid" (Final Fantasy IV))	シドのテーマ	1:29
5.	"Moglie Theme ~ Mog's Muzik" ("Mog" (Final Fantasy VI))	モーグリのテーマ	2:09
6.	"Pleasant Journey ~ Road Rollick" ("Good 'ol Fellows" (Final Fantasy III))	ゆかいな旅路	1:08
7.	"Golem's Theme ~ Golem's Groove" ("Ancient Castle" (Final Fantasy II))	ゴーレムのテーマ	1:43
8.	"Goblin's Theme ~ Goblin's Gambol" ("Pirates Ahoy" (Final Fantasy V))	ゴブリンのテーマ	2:20
9.	"Bizarre Mystery ~ Spooky-Wooky!!!" ("This Is the Last Battle" (Final Fantasy III))	奇々怪々	1:18
10.	"Black Mage's Theme ~ Magician's March" ("Mystic Mysidia" (Final Fantasy IV))	黒魔道師のテーマ	1:54
11.	"White Mage's Theme ~ Mage's Melody" ("City Theme" (Final Fantasy I))	白魔道師のテーマ	3:13
12.	"Crystal Legend ~ La-La Legend" ("Prelude" (Final Fantasy I))	クリスタルの伝説	1:44
13.	"Fat Chocobo's Theme ~ Chubby's Bop-pop" ("Hello! Big Chocobo!" (Final Fantasy IV))	デブチョコボのテーマ	1:07
14.	"Behemoth's Theme" ("Crystal Cave" (Final Fantasy III))	ベヒーモスのテーマ	2:12
15.	"Phantom Beast Lord ~ The Esper King" ("Opening Theme" (Final Fantasy VI), "Book of Sealing" (Final Fantasy V))	幻獣神	1:51
16.	"Make a Chocobo ~ Chocobo Creatin'" (Chocobo theme (Final Fantasy))	つくってチョコボ	0:34
17.	"Cid's Test Course ~ Cid's Test Track" (Chocobo theme (Final Fantasy))	シドのテストコース	1:31
18.	"Moglie Forest" ("Town 2" (Final Fantasy VI))	モーグリフォレスト	2:22
19.	"Ruins of the Giants ~ The Ancient Gate" ("Battle 2" (Final Fantasy III))	巨人の遺跡	1:49
20.	"Mithril Mines" ("Gurugu Volcano" (Final Fantasy I))	ミスリル鉱山	1:49
21.	"House of Black ~ The Black Manor" ("Magician's Tower" (Final Fantasy II))	黒の館	2:04
22.	"Mysidia's Sky Garden ~ Floating Gardens" ("Ending Theme ~ The New Origin" (Final Fantasy V))	ミシディア空中庭園	2:09
23.	"Hungry Land ~ Gingerbread Land" (Chocobo theme (Final Fantasy))	ハングリーランド	1:57
24.	"Gurgu Volcano ~ Vulcan-O-Valley" ("Battle 2" (Final Fantasy II))	グルグ火山	1:59
25.	"Illusionary World ~ Fantasia" ("This Is the Last Battle" (Final Fantasy III))	幻界	2:56
26.	"FF8 Circuit" ("Don't Be Afraid" (Final Fantasy VIII))	FF8サーキット	3:03
27.	"Win! ~ Winner's Jig" ("Fanfare" (Final Fantasy))	WIN!	0:48
28.	"Lose... ~ Loser's Requiem" (Chocobo theme (Final Fantasy))	LOSE…	0:09
29.	"The World's Tomorrow ~ Happily Ever Chocobo" (Chocobo theme (Final Fantasy))	世界のあした	1:47
30.	"Treasure Chest of the Heart ~ Ending Theme"	心のたからばこ	6:14

=== Chocobo and the Magic Books ===
The Chocobo and the Magic Books mini-series comprises Chocobo to Mahou no Ehon, released in North America as Final Fantasy Fables: Chocobo Tales and literally translating to Chocobo and the Magic Picture Book, as well as its to-date Japan-only sequel, Chocobo to Mahō no Ehon: Majō to Shōjo to Gonin no Yūsha, translated as Chocobo and the Magic Picture Book: The Witch, The Maiden, and the Five Heroes. Neither game has received a separate full soundtrack release; Chocobo Tales produced a download-only album on iTunes titled The Best of Chocobo and the Magic Book Original Soundtrack, while together their soundtracks were released in full as the two-disc Chocobo and the Magic Books Original Soundtrack. The majority of the tracks are either unchanged versions or arrangements of Final Fantasy and Chocobo compositions; Chocobo Tales contains only two original tracks—one of which is only eight seconds long—while its sequel has 12 original tracks out of 33. The soundtracks for both games were composed by Yuzo Takahashi. Magic Books contains 61 tracks across two discs, with a total length of 1:51:57; Best of's 10 tracks span 26:16. The tracks in Best of correspond to tracks 8, 1, 3, 9, 19, 25, 12, 18, 27, and 28 of the first disc of Magic Books, in that order.

While neither album has seen much attention from critics, The Best of Chocobo and the Magic Book Original Soundtrack was dismissed by Chris of Square Enix Music Online as "not a worthwhile sampler" of the soundtrack. Terming it a "truncated compilation", he criticized the track selection as including what were in his opinion some of the weakest arrangements while excluding the strongest, and concluded that the album serves no purpose given the subsequent release of the full soundtrack as part of The Best of Chocobo and the Magic Book Original Soundtrack. He was much more complimentary of the Magic Books album, saying that it "confirmed that Yuzo Takahashi is a bright young composer" and calling the arrangements and original compositions "both melodically engaging and stylistically versatile".

Tracklist

Disc 1
No.	Title	Japanese title	Length
1.	"Odeka de Chocobo" (Chocobo theme)	『おでかけチョコボ』チョコボシリーズテーマ曲	1:15
2.	"The Sure Bet Chocobo" (Final Fantasy VII)	本命穴チョコボ	1:30
3.	"Chocobo Village" (Chocobo's Mysterious Dungeon)	チョコボの村	4:14
4.	"Gurgu Volcano" (Final Fantasy I)	グルグ火山	1:56
5.	"Legend of the Great Forest" (Final Fantasy V)	大森林の伝説	1:29
6.	"Underwater Temple" (Final Fantasy III)	海底神殿	2:26
7.	"Makou Reactor" (Final Fantasy VII)	魔晄炉	2:23
8.	"The Prelude" (Final Fantasy I)	プレリュード	2:10
9.	"Fiddle de Chocobo" (Final Fantasy VII)	フィドル・デ・チョコボ	2:03
10.	"Move de Chocobo" (Chocobo theme)	ムーブ・デ・チョコボ	0:56
11.	"March de Chocobo" (Chocobo theme)	マーチ・デ・チョコボ	1:39
12.	"Retro de Chocobo" (Chocobo theme)	レトロ・デ・チョコボ	1:07
13.	"Battle de Chocobo" (Chocobo theme)	バトル・デ・チョコボ	1:32
14.	"Victory Intro" (Final Fantasy I)	勝利イントロ	0:08
15.	"Defeat Intro" (Chocobo theme)	敗北イントロ	0:09
16.	"Victory" (Final Fantasy I)	勝利	0:35
17.	"Defeat" (Final Fantasy I)	敗北	0:41
18.	"White Mage's Theme" (Chocobo Racing)	白魔道士のテーマ	3:04
19.	"The Writings of the Seal" (Final Fantasy V)	封印の書	1:28
20.	"Theme of the Irma Army"	イルマ軍団のテーマ	2:26
21.	"Gishal's Veggies" (Final Fantasy III)	ギサールの野菜	0:58
22.	"Theme of Sorrow" (Final Fantasy IV)	哀しみのテーマ	1:44
23.	"Crystal Room" (Final Fantasy III)	クリスタルルーム	0:55
24.	"The Magic Book"	絵本の魔法	0:09
25.	"Battle Scene" (Final Fantasy I)	戦闘シーン	2:10
26.	"The Decisive Battle" (Final Fantasy VI)	決戦』	2:13
27.	"Clash on the Big Bridge" (Final Fantasy V)	ビッグブリッヂの死闘	2:38
28.	"Ride On" (Final Fantasy VIII)	Ride On	2:27

Disc 2
No.	Title	Japanese title	Length
1.	"The Magic, The Girl and the 5 Heroes" (Chocobo theme)	魔法と少女と5人の勇者	3:07
2.	"Ronfaure" (Final Fantasy XI)	Ronfaure	4:06
3.	"Ru'Lude Gardens" (Final Fantasy XI)	Ru'Lude Gardens	2:41
4.	"Mysidia" (Final Fantasy IV)	ミシディア国	1:15
5.	"Battle 2" (Final Fantasy IV)	バトル2	1:35
6.	"Ukule le Chocobo" (Final Fantasy IX)	ウクレ・le・チョコボ	1:33
7.	"Electric de Chocobo" (Final Fantasy VII)	エレキ・デ・チョコボ	2:23
8.	"A Wolf that Falls in Love First Movement"	恋に落ちたオオカミ 第一楽章	1:13
9.	"A Wolf that Falls in Love Second Movement"	恋に落ちたオオカミ 第二楽章	1:25
10.	"A Wolf that Falls in Love Third Movement"	恋に落ちたオオカミ 第三楽章	1:09
11.	"The Unforgiven" (Final Fantasy VI)	許されざる者	1:09
12.	"Clash on the Big Bridge" (Final Fantasy V)	ビッグブリッヂの死闘	2:46
13.	"Lonely Stuffed Dolls First Movement"	ひとりぼっちのぬいぐるみ 第一楽章	0:54
14.	"Lonely Stuffed Dolls Second Movement"	ひとりぼっちのぬいぐるみ 第二楽章	2:21
15.	"Lonely Stuffed Dolls Third Movement"	ひとりぼっちのぬいぐるみ 第三楽章	1:48
16.	"Searching for Friends" (Final Fantasy VI)	仲間を求めて	1:54
17.	"Dancing Doll Calcobrena" (Final Fantasy IV)	踊る人形カルコブリーナ	1:44
18.	"Palom & Porom's Theme" (Final Fantasy IV)	パロム・ポロムのテーマ	1:07
19.	"Cornelia Castle" (Final Fantasy I)	コーネリア城	1:47
20.	"Dead Music" (Final Fantasy I)	デッドミュージック	1:50
21.	"By a Hair's Breadth!" (Final Fantasy V)	危機一髪!	1:13
22.	"Twins Flying in the Sky First Movement"	空飛ぶ双子 第一楽章	0:46
23.	"Twins Flying in the Sky Second Movement"	空飛ぶ双子 第二楽章	1:01
24.	"Twins Flying in the Sky Third Movement"	空飛ぶ双子 第三楽章	1:30
25.	"Blackjack" (Final Fantasy VI)	飛空艇ブラックジャック	2:01
26.	"Seymour Battle" (Final Fantasy X)	シーモアバトル	3:45
27.	"Girl Without a Name First Movement"	なまえのない少女 第一楽章	0:57
28.	"Girl Without a Name Second Movement"	なまえのない少女 第二楽章	1:23
29.	"Girl Without a Name Third Movement"	なまえのない少女 第三楽章	1:41
30.	"Tough Battle" (Final Fantasy XI)	Tough Battle	3:30
31.	"J-E-N-O-V-A" (Final Fantasy VII)	J-E-N-O-V-A	2:04
32.	"Glass Goth X ~ Glass Goth Z" (Chocobo's Mysterious Dungeon 2)	グラスゴスX〜グラスゴスZ	2:08
33.	"Fina le Chocobo" (Chocobo theme)	フィナー・le・チョコボ	6:14
