= List of Chocobo media =

Franchise of video games and media

The Chocobo series is a collection of video games published by Square, and later by Square Enix, featuring a recurring creature from the Final Fantasy series, the Chocobo, as the protagonist. The creature is a large and normally flightless bird which first appeared in Final Fantasy II and has been featured in almost all subsequent Final Fantasy games, as well as making cameo appearances in numerous other games. The Chocobo series of video games contains over 20 titles for video game consoles, mobile phones, and online platforms. These games include installments of the Mystery Dungeon series of roguelike video games, racing games, adventure games, and minigame collections. Although the various games of the series have different game styles and are generally unrelated except by their inclusion of a Chocobo as the main character, Square Enix considers them to be a distinct series.

The first game, Chocobo's Mysterious Dungeon, is an entry in the Mystery Dungeon series and was released in 1997. In addition to Square and Square Enix, the games have been developed by several other companies, including h.a.n.d., Bottle Cube, and Smile-Lab. Eight albums of music from Chocobo games have been produced and published by Square Enix, DigiCube, and Toshiba EMI, and an additional album of Chocobo-related music from both the Chocobo and Final Fantasy series, Compi de Chocobo, was released in 2013.

== Games ==
Games
Title	Original release date		
Title	Japan	North America	PAL region
Chocobo's Mysterious Dungeon	December 23, 1997	none	none
Notes: Released on PlayStation.; Developed and published by Square.; Known in Japan as Chocobo no Fushigi na Dungeon (Chocobo's Mystery Dungeon).; Produced by Koichi Nakamura.; Part of the Mystery Dungeon series of roguelike video games.; Also available on WonderSwan (1999) and PlayStation Network (2010).; Japan's tenth-best-selling game of 1997, with sales of nearly 650,000 units.; Received a "Platinum Prize" from Sony for sales above one million units in Japan by mid-1998.
Chocobo's Dungeon 2	December 23, 1998	December 15, 1999	none
Notes: Released on PlayStation.; Developed and published by Square.; Originally released in Japan under the title Chocobo's Mystery Dungeon 2 (チョコボの不思議なダンジョン2, Chocobo no Fushigi na Dungeon 2).; Part of the Mystery Dungeon series of roguelike video games.; A WonderSwan Color version was planned but not released.; Also available on PlayStation Network (2010).
Chocobo World	February 11, 1999	January 25, 2000 (Windows)	February 18, 2000 (Windows)
Notes: Released on PocketStation.; Developed and published by Square.; A minigame released as part of Final Fantasy VIII.; Originally released in Japan under the title Let's Go Out Chocobo RPG (おでかけチョコボRPG, Odekake Chokobo RPG).; Included in the Windows version of Final Fantasy VIII (2000).
Chocobo Racing	March 18, 1999	August 10, 1999	October 11, 1999
Notes: Released on PlayStation.; Developed and published by Square.; A racing video game.; Originally released in Japan under the title Chocobo Racing: Road to the Spirit World (チョコボレーシング 〜幻界へのロード〜, Chokobo Rēshingu ~ Genkai e no Rōdo ~).; Also included in the Chocobo Collection compilation release (1999, Japan).; Also available on PlayStation Network (2009).
Chocobo Stallion	December 22, 1999	none	none
Notes: Released on PlayStation.; Developed by ParityBit and published by Square in the Chocobo Collection compilation release.; A Chocobo raising and racing simulation.; Also available on PlayStation Network (2008).
Dice de Chocobo	December 22, 1999	none	none
Notes: Released on PlayStation.; Developed by Denyusha and published by Square in the Chocobo Collection compilation release.; A board game.; Released on Game Boy Advance in 2002, as Chocobo Land: A Game of Dice.; PlayStation version available on PlayStation Network (2008).; Game Boy Advance version released on Nintendo Wii U Virtual Console on February 10, 2016.
Chocobo Collection	December 22, 1999	none	none
Notes: Released on PlayStation.; A compilation of Chocobo Racing, Chocobo Stallion, and Dice de Chocobo.
Hataraku Chocobo	September 21, 2000	none	none
Notes: Released on WonderSwan.; Developed and published by Square.; Title translates as Working Chocobo.; A life simulation game.
Dokodemo Chocobo	May 24, 2002	none	none
Notes: Released on mobile phones.; Developed and published by Square.; Title translates as Chocobo Anywhere.; A two-part app; the first part is an adventure game, while in the second part items obtained in the first part can be used to decorate the standby screen of the phone.
Dokodemo Chocobo 2: Dasshutsu! Yūreisen	May 23, 2003	none	none
Notes: Released on mobile phones.; Developed and published by Square Enix.; Title translates as Chocobo Anywhere 2: Escape! Ghost Ship.; An adventure game available for a different model of phone than Dokodemo Chocobo.; A second part to the game with similar gameplay was released as a stand-alone download in 2004, titled Chocobo Anywhere 2.5: Infiltration! Ancient Ruin (どこでもチョコボ2・5 潜入! 古代遺跡, Dokodemo Chokobo 2.5: Sennyū! Kodai Iseki).
Choco-Mate	May 23, 2003	none	none
Notes: Released on mobile phones.; Developed and published by Square Enix.; Social networking service for mobile phones.
Dokodemo Chocobo 3: Taose! Niji Iro Daimaō	May 19, 2004	none	none
Notes: Released on mobile phones.; Developed and published by Square Enix.; Title translates as Chocobo Anywhere 3: Defeat! The Great Rainbow-Colored Demon.; An adventure game like Dokodemo Chocobo 2 for a third model of phone.
Chocobo de Mobile	December 14, 2006	none	none
Notes: Released on mobile phones.; Developed and published by Square Enix.; Mobile application featuring sports and other mini-games.
Final Fantasy Fables: Chocobo Tales	December 14, 2006	April 3, 2007	May 25, 2007
Notes: Released on Nintendo DS.; Developed by h.a.n.d. and published by Square Enix.; Originally released in Japan under the title Chocobo and the Magic Picture Book (チョコボと魔法の絵本, Chocobo to Mahō no Ehon).; An adventure and puzzle game.
Final Fantasy Fables: Chocobo's Dungeon	December 13, 2007	July 8, 2008	November 7, 2008
Notes: Released on Wii.; Developed by h.a.n.d. and published by Square Enix.; Originally released in Japan under the title Chocobo's Mystery Dungeon: The Labyrinth of Forgotten Time (チョコボの不思議なダンジョン 時忘れの迷宮, Chocobo no Fushigi na Dungeon: Toki Wasure no Meikyū).; Part of the Mystery Dungeon series of roguelike video games.
Cid to Chocobo no Fushigi na Dungeon Toki Wasure no Meikyū DS+	October 30, 2008	none	none
Notes: Released on Nintendo DS.; Developed by h.a.n.d. and published by Square Enix.; Title translates as Cid and Chocobo's Mystery Dungeon: The Labyrinth of Forgotten Time DS+.; Enhanced port of Final Fantasy Fables: Chocobo's Dungeon.; Part of the Mystery Dungeon series of roguelike video games.
Chocobo to Mahō no Ehon: Majo to Shōjo to Gonin no Yūsha	December 11, 2008	none	none
Notes: Released on Nintendo DS.; Developed by h.a.n.d. and published by Square Enix.; Title translates as Chocobo and the Magic Picture Book: The Witch, the Girl, and the Five Heroes.; Adventure and puzzle game sequel to Final Fantasy Fables: Chocobo Tales.
Chocobo Panic	May 28, 2010	May 28, 2010	May 28, 2010
Notes: Released on iPad.; Developed by Bottle Cube and published by Square Enix.; A party game.; Removed from Apple App Store in 2017.
Chocobo's Crystal Tower	June 29, 2010	November 2, 2010 (Facebook)	November 2, 2010 (Facebook)
Notes: Released on mobile phones.; Developed by h.a.n.d. and published by Square Enix.; Originally released in Japan under the title Chocobo to Crystal no Tō (チョコボとクリスタルの塔, Chokobo to Kurisutaru no Tō; lit. "Chocobo and the Crystal Tower").; Additionally released as a Facebook app.; A life simulation game.; Later shut down.
Chocobo no Chocotto Nouen	December 19, 2012	none	none
Notes: Released on the GREE mobile platform.; Developed by Smile-Lab and published by Square Enix.; Title translates as Chocobo's Chocotto Farm.; A farming game.
Chocobo Racing 3D	cancelled	none	none
Notes: Announced for Nintendo 3DS.; In development by h.a.n.d. and to be published by Square Enix.; Cancellation confirmed in 2013.; A racing game.
Chocobo's Mystery Dungeon EVERY BUDDY!	March 20, 2019	March 20, 2019	March 20, 2019
Notes: Released on Nintendo Switch and PlayStation 4.; Published by Square Enix.; Remake of Final Fantasy Fables: Chocobo's Dungeon.; Part of the Mystery Dungeon series of roguelike video games.
Chocobo GP'	January 13, 2022	January 13, 2022	January 13, 2022
Notes: Released on iOS and Android.; Published by Square Enix.; A platform game.; Free-to-play and acting as a promotional tie-in for Nintendo Switch Chocobo GP.; Later delisted from marketplaces.
Chocobo GP	March 10, 2022	March 10, 2022	March 10, 2022
Notes: Released on Nintendo Switch.; Published by Square Enix.; A racing game.

== Printed ==
Printed
Title	Release date(s)	Media type	Ref.
Chocobo's Crystal Hunt	November 2016	Card game	
Card game for two to four players; Chocobo's Dungeon & Monsters expansion released in August 2017; Chocobo's Crystal Hunt Deluxe version released in February 2026, including expansion pack
Chocobo Party Up!	November 2019	Board game	
Board game for two to four players
Chocobo and the Airship	March 21, 2023	Picture book	
Written by Kazuhiko Aoki and illustrated by Toshiyuki Itahana; A novel featuring a story not directly tied into the events of the games; ISBN 978-1-64609-203-1
Chocobo's Dungeon: The Board Game	February 2024	Board game	
Board game for one to four players

== Music ==
Music albums
Title	Release date	Length	Label	Ref.
Chocobo no Fushigina Dungeon Original Soundtrack	December 21, 1997	1:11:37	DigiCube	
Chocobo no Fushigina Dungeon Coi Vanni Gialli	February 5, 1998	40:52	DigiCube	
Chocobo no Fushigina Dungeon 2 Original Soundtrack	January 21, 1999	1:05:40	DigiCube	
Chocobo Racing Original Soundtrack	March 25, 1999	57:00	Square Enix	
The Best of Chocobo and the Magic Book Original Soundtrack	March 25, 1999	26:16	Square Enix	
Chocobo and the Magic Books Original Soundtrack	March 25, 1999	1:51:57	Square Enix	
Chocobo no Fushigina Dungeon Toki Wasure No Meikyuu: Door Crawl	December 12, 2007	14:18	Toshiba EMI	
Chocobo no Fushigina Dungeon Toki Wasure No Meikyū Original Soundtrack	January 23, 2008	1:16:01	Square Enix	
Compi de Chocobo	September 21, 2013	2:13:01	Square Enix	
