= Chocobo (series) =

Video game series

- There is no unified logo for the series; this logo was used in Chocobo's Mystery Dungeon Every Buddy!
- Publishers: Square, Square Enix
- Artist: Toshiyuki Itahana
- First release: Chocobo's Mysterious Dungeon; December 23, 1997
- Latest release: Chocobo GP; March 10, 2022
- Parent series: Final Fantasy

The Chocobo series is part of the Final Fantasy franchise owned by Square Enix. A spin-off series meant to have more child and casual gamer appeal than the main games, it spans multiple genres, beginning with Chocobo's Mysterious Dungeon in 1997. It features a recurring cast of characters designed by Toshiyuki Itahana and rendered in a more chibi style than traditional Final Fantasy games. They include Chocobo, the protagonist and a member of the fictional chocobo species of flightless birds; Mog, a moogle who is Chocobo's friend, Shirma, a white mage, and Croma, a black mage, among other recurring series characters. One of the most major genres within the series are Mystery Dungeon games, while it has also branched off into tabletop games. Its most recent entry is Chocobo GP, a kart racing game released in 2022 for the Nintendo Switch.

== Games ==
Release timeline
1997	Chocobo's Mysterious Dungeon
1998	Chocobo's Dungeon 2
1999	Chocobo Racing; Chocobo Collection
2000	Hataraku Chocobo
2001
2002	Chocobo Land: A Game of Dice; Chocobo Anywhere
2003	Chocobo Anywhere 2: Escape! Ghost Ship; Choco-Mate
2004	Chocobo Anywhere 2.5: Infiltrate! Ancient Ruins; Chocobo Anywhere 3: Defeat! The Great Rainbow-Colored Demon
2005
2006	Final Fantasy Fables: Chocobo Tales; Chocobo de Mobile
2007	Final Fantasy Fables: Chocobo's Dungeon
2008	Chocobo Tales: The Witch, the Girl, and the Five Heroes; Cid and Chocobo's Mysterious Dungeon
2009
2010	Chocobo Panic; Chocobo's Crystal Tower
2011
2012	Chocobo's Chocotto Farm
2013–2018
2019	Chocobo's Mystery Dungeon Every Buddy!
2020–2021
2022	Chocobo GP'; Chocobo GP

The first released Chocobo game was the 1997 Chocobo's Mysterious Dungeon for PlayStation. It was followed on the console by a 1998 sequel, Chocobo's Dungeon 2, as well as Chocobo Racing in 1999. Racing was bundled with two other games, Chocobo Stallion, a racing and breeding game, and Dice de Chocobo, a digital board game, to comprise the Chocobo Collection compilation, released the same year.

Hataraku Chocobo was released in 2000 exclusively in Japan for WonderSwan. The game received an unofficial English patch by fans for the WonderSwan Color version. This patch translates the name to Working Chocobo. Chocobo Anywhere was released in 2002 for mobile. Chocobo Anywhere received several sequels throughout 2003 and 2004; Chocobo Anywhere 2: Escape! Ghost Ship, Chocobo Anywhere 2.5: Infiltrate! Ancient Ruins, and Chocobo Anywhere 3: Defeat! The Great Rainbow-Colored Demon. Two other mobile games, Choco-Mate and Chocobo de Mobile, were released in 2003 and 2006, respectively.

On handheld consoles, Chocobo Land: A Game of Dice, an enhanced version of Dice de Chocobo, was released in 2002 for Game Boy Advance. It was followed up in 2006 by Final Fantasy Fables: Chocobo Tales for Nintendo DS. Chocobo Tales would go on to receive a Japan-only sequel in 2008, Chocobo Tales: The Witch, the Girl, and the Five Heroes. Cid and Chocobo's Mysterious Dungeon was released on DS the same year. On home consoles, Final Fantasy Fables: Chocobo's Dungeon was released on 2007 for the Wii.

2010 saw the release of Chocobo Panic for iOS and Chocobo's Crystal Tower for mobile. A farming sim, Chocobo's Chocotto Farm, was released in 2012, also for iOS. The series then went on hiatus until 2019, when Chocobo's Mystery Dungeon Every Buddy!, a remake of the original Wii title, was released for Nintendo Switch and PlayStation 4. This was followed by the 2022 release of Chocobo GP, a kart racing game, for iOS, Android and Switch.

=== Cancelled games ===
Chocobo Racing 3D, a kart racing game for 3DS that would have been a sequel to Chocobo Racing, was announced at E3 2010, but cancelled in 2013 due to its quality falling short of the company's standards.

== Other media ==
Various tabletop games based on the franchise and illustrated by Itahana have been released. A card game, Chocobo's Crystal Hunt, was released in 2016. A board game, Chocobo Party Up!, was released in 2019.

A picture book, Chocobo and the Airship, was released in 2021 in Japan and 2023 in the West. It follows Chocobo and the recurring character Cid as they attempt to build an airship and fight off monsters threatening their town.

== Development ==
The character designer of the Chocobo series, Toshiyuki Itahana, also worked on the Final Fantasy Crystal Chronicles series, Final Fantasy IX, and Final Fantasy Explorers. When he was initially designing the Chocobo character for Chocobo's Mysterious Dungeon, he attempted to stylize it to be visible on a square grid. He tried to make its appearance more stylish, retaining monster-like elements such as a sharper beak, but believed such a design was unfitting for a "beloved protagonist" and made it more rounded and cute. The character of Mog was added due to Chocobo's inability to speak, in order to have a talking partner that could communicate Chocobo's thoughts to the player.

In addition to the series itself, Chocobo received a cameo appearance in a mainline game, Final Fantasy XIV, under the alias of Alpha. He was chosen for the role due to having beaten Omega the most of any Final Fantasy character.

== Reception ==
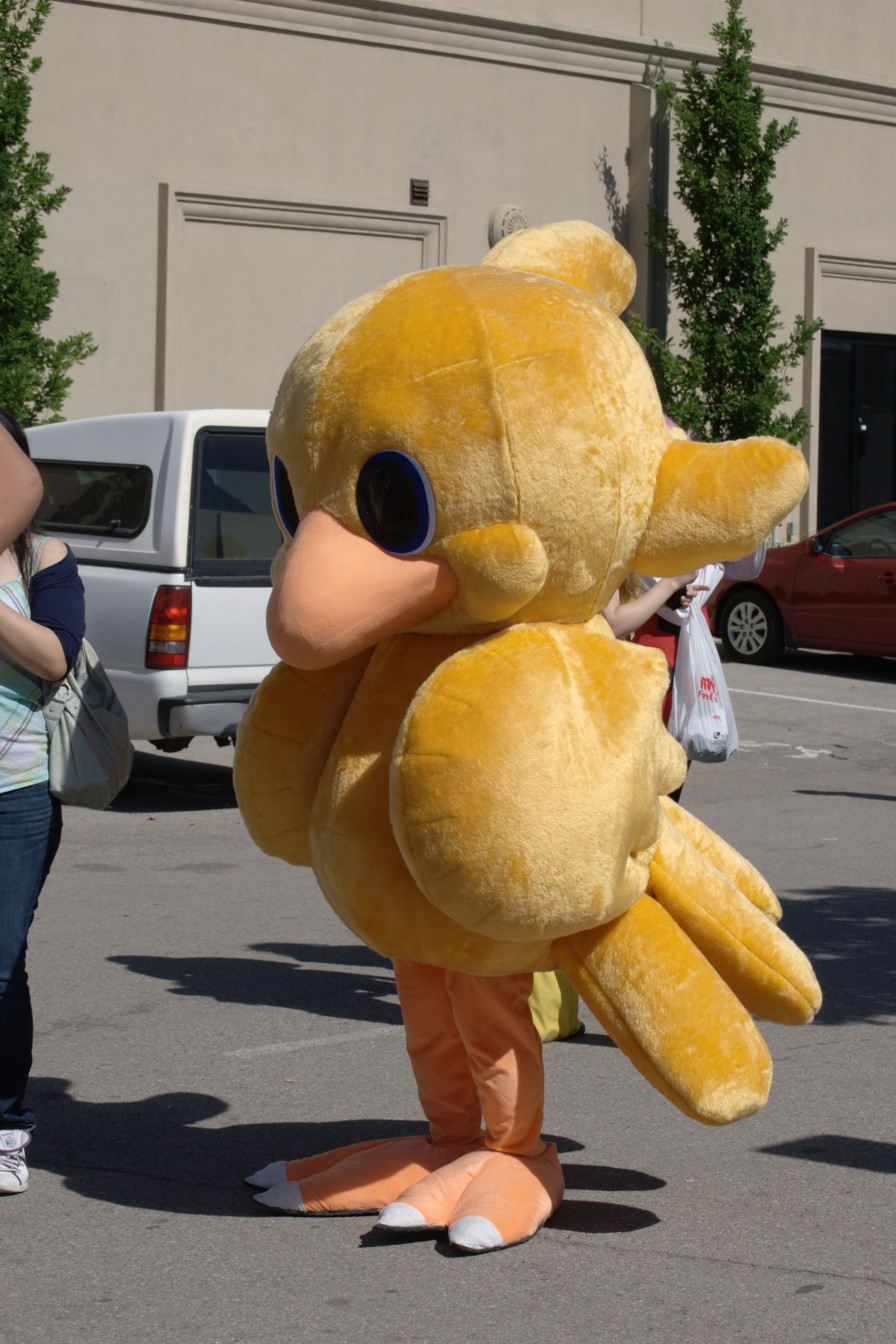
Fan-made cosplay depicting Chocobo, the chibi protagonist of the series

The Chocobo series was initially received with surprise in the West due to Square's reputation for hardcore games. In 1999, IGN called Chocobo Racing a "commercial tangent" that more resembled a Nintendo game, describing Chocobo as a "strange, loveable bird-creature".

In 2007, Frank Caron of Ars Technica criticized many of the games in the series, stating that they were "rather unappealing". He described the Chocobo's Dungeon sub-series as "simplistic dungeon crawling of the lowest common denominator", while calling Chocobo Racing a "completely derivative kart-racing clone". However, he praised Chocobo's design, stating that he was "so readily identifiable that I simply can't deny myself the natural desire to take part in his wily adventures" despite being a "seemingly ordinary bird". He also expressed excitement for the release of Chocobo Tales, saying that it had him "rapt" due to its art style and gameplay. In 2009, IGN noted that by the time of the PlayStation, Square Enix was eager to exploit the popularity of the Final Fantasy series in a way they never had before. Describing the Chocobo series as "moderately enjoyable adventures" that "hopped across all genres", they nevertheless called Final Fantasy Tactics "the only PlayStation-era spin-off that really matters". In 2012, Retro Gamer magazine called the "undoubted highlight" of the sub-series Chocobo Tales despite its games of numerous genres. In 2023, The A.V. Club stated that while the Chocobo series arrived "sporadically" in America, it was "typically welcome" when it did, combining "kid-friendly aesthetics" with "beefy" gameplay in the case of its Mystery Dungeon entries.
