= Final Fantasy Fables =

Final Fantasy Fables may refer to:

- Final Fantasy Fables: Chocobo Tales, a 2006 game for the Nintendo DS
- Final Fantasy Fables: Chocobo's Dungeon, a 2007 game for the Wii
