= Mogri =

Mogri may refer to:

- Moogle, from Final Fantasy
- Meghri, Armenia
