= Kazuhiko Aoki (video game designer) =

Japanese video game designer

- 青木 和彦
- Born: 6 November 1961 (age 64)
- Occupations: Director, producer, game designer
- Years active: 1984–present
- Employers: Square (1984–2003); Square Enix (2003–2025)

Kazuhiko Aoki (青木 和彦, Aoki Kazuhiko) (born 6 November 1961) is a Japanese video game designer. He is most famous for assembling the team that created Chrono Trigger, which he produced, and for his designs for the Final Fantasy series.

Aoki left Square Enix in June 2025 to be a freelancer.

== Games ==
Aoki has been credited, in some capacity, with the following games.

Year	Title	Role(s)
1986	Cruise Chaser Blassty	Game design
1987	Nakayama Miho no Tokimeki High School	Staff
1988	Hanjuku Hero	Director, game design
1990	Final Fantasy III	Battle design
1991	Final Fantasy IV	Battle design
1992	Hanjuku Hero: Aa, Sekaiyo Hanjukunare...!	Producer
1995	Chrono Trigger	Producer
1996	Koi wa Balance	Game design
1997	Final Fantasy VII	Event planner
1997	Final Fantasy IV (PlayStation ver.)	Director
1997	Chocobo's Dungeon	Director
1998	Final Fantasy V (PlayStation ver.)	Supervisor
1998	Chocobo's Dungeon 2	Director
1999	Final Fantasy Anthology	Supervisor
1999	Chocobo Racing	Special thanks
2000	Final Fantasy IX	Event design
2001	Final Fantasy Chronicles	Director
2003	Fire Emblem	Quality assurance
2003	Final Fantasy Crystal Chronicles	Director
2005	Code Age Commanders	Planning director
2006	Final Fantasy III (Nintendo DS ver.)	Battle supervisor
2008	Final Fantasy IV: The After Years	Battle design
2011	Final Fantasy IV: The Complete Collection	Battle design
2012	Dragon Quest X	Chief world planner
