= Chocobo GP =

- Developer: Arika
- Publisher: Square Enix
- Directors: Akihiko Maeda; Shoichi Takano
- Producers: Hironori Okayama; Ichiro Mihara
- Artist: Rubi Asami
- Composer: Hidenori Iwasaki
- Series: Final Fantasy; Chocobo
- Engine: Unreal Engine 4
- Platform: Nintendo Switch
- Release: March 10, 2022
- Genre: Kart racing
- Modes: Single-player, multiplayer

Chocobo GP (Note: Japanese: チョコボGP, Hepburn: Chokobo GP) is a 2022 kart racing game developed by Arika and published by Square Enix for the Nintendo Switch. The game is a spin-off of the Final Fantasy series and is a sequel to 1999's Chocobo Racing. It was released in celebration of the series' 35th anniversary and features locales and characters from across the franchise.

Chocobo GP received mixed reviews from critics; while praise was given for its controls, track designs, items and character-specific abilities, criticism was given for the game's monetisation model.

== Gameplay ==
The game is a kart racing game featuring single-player and multiplayer modes. The player chooses a character from the Final Fantasy series of video games and directs them through a race track in efforts to finish before the other racers. Players can perform power-slide drifts to help make tight turns and get extra speed boosts. Items called "magicite" can be collected by driving a character into "Magic Eggs", and can be used to either help the player's character, or hinder other racers. Individual characters also have specific abilities, and vehicles can be customized by the player. The game features multiple modes, including a "story mode", custom races, and online races. The online races include a 64 player elimination tournament mode as well.

== Setting ==
The game's story mode includes characters entering a racing tournament offers a winning prize of "a wish for anything their heart desires". Race courses are set in locations from various Final Fantasy games, such as the Gold Saucer from Final Fantasy VII, the town of Zozo from VI and the town of Alexandria from IX. Characters in the game include both specific party members from previous Final Fantasy games and characters from the previous Chocobo spin-off games. The roster includes Chocobos, Moogles, White Mages, Black Mages, Vivi, Steiner, Terra Branford, Cactuar, and Maduin, among others. Cloud Strife and Squall Leonhart were added to the roster in Season 1 as a prize pass unlockable and purchasable character with Gil, respectively.

== Development and release ==
The game is a sequel to the 1999 PlayStation game Chocobo Racing. A follow-up to the game was first announced in 2010 for the Nintendo 3DS, though its development was outsourced, the quality suffered, and was quietly cancelled by 2013. In March 2021, publications noted trademarks being filed for a Chocobo GP and Chocobo Grand Prix. Chocobo GP was officially confirmed during a Nintendo Direct broadcast in September. It was released for the Nintendo Switch on March 10, 2022, alongside a free version of the game, titled Chocobo GP Lite. This free-to-play version of the game included the Story Prologue, Chocobo GP mode, three characters, local and online multiplayer, and allowed players to transfer their progress over to the full version of the game after purchase. The full version featured a battle pass and microtransactions. The game's soundtrack was composed by Hidenori Iwasaki.

Nine months after the game's release, Square Enix announced that support in the form of future content would end for the game, as well as the ability to purchase the in-game premium currency, Mythril. The game was re-released in June 2023 with all microtransaction content being added to the game in the form of in-game unlockables for $49.99. Players who previously downloaded the free version could purchase an upgrade to receive all of the content as well as transfer their save file to the re-released version of the game.

== Reception ==
Reception

Aggregate score
Aggregator	Score
Metacritic	63/100

Review scores
Publication	Score
Destructoid	6.5/10
Hardcore Gamer	3/5
Jeuxvideo.com	15/20
Nintendo Life	8/10
Nintendo World Report	6/10
PC Games (DE)	6/10
PCMag	3.0/5
RPGFan	79/100
Shacknews	8/10
The Games Machine (Italy)	7.5/10

Chocobo GP received "mixed or average" reviews according to review aggregator website Metacritic.

Destructoid gave the game a 6.5 out of 10, writing, "...if you're looking for a serviceable racer to play on the side that's full of old school unlocks Chocobo GP is a fine option; provided you can get past a few hurdles. Hopefully a series of patches, the eventual possible elimination of the season pass system, and a price cut will make this package way more enticing". Nintendo Life and Shacknews reviewed the game more positively, praising the controls, tracks, character-specific abilities, items, roster, modes, performance, and the potential of the Chocobo GP mode, while criticizing the weak story mode and paid season pass.

Chocobo GP's monetization model also received some criticism. In response, Square Enix gave players a set amount of the free in-game currency "mythril", and adjusted settings to make progression easier. It was discovered by players that free mythril would expire five months after it was accrued, while any mythril that players paid for would remain.

Chocobo GP was the sixth best-selling retail game during its first week of release in Japan, with 12,414 physical copies being sold.
