= Final Fantasy Fables: Chocobo Tales =

2006 video game

- North American box art featuring the titular Chocobo (center) along with several characters including Irma (left), Shirma (right), and Croma (far right).
- Developer: h.a.n.d.
- Publisher: Square Enix
- Director: Kouji Yamamoto
- Producer: Yuki Yokoyama
- Artist: Toshiyuki Itahana
- Composer: Yuzo Takahashi
- Series: Chocobo series
- Platform: Nintendo DS
- Release: JP: December 14, 2006; NA: April 3, 2007; AU: May 24, 2007; EU: May 25, 2007
- Genre: Adventure
- Modes: Single-player, multiplayer

Final Fantasy Fables: Chocobo Tales (Note: Japanese: チョコボと魔法の絵本, Hepburn: Chocobo to Mahō no Ehon; lit. 'Chocobo and the Magic Picture Book') is a 2006 adventure game developed by h.a.n.d. and published by Square Enix for the Nintendo DS. It was released in Japan on December 14, 2006, and in North American and PAL regions in spring 2007. A spin-off of the Final Fantasy franchise, Chocobo Tales stars a Chocobo and features a setting with common elements and creatures from its parent series.

The player controls the eponymous character as it traverses magical tomes to defeat the main antagonist, the Darkmaster Bebuzzu. Throughout the game, the player encounters various minigames and microgames as well as participates in pop-up duels that feature card-based combat. Created exclusively for the Nintendo DS, the developers included touchscreen controls and online multiplayer options. The title's music includes arrangements of tracks from the Final Fantasy series and Chocobo subseries.

Chocobo Tales was received overall positively by critics, who appreciated the originality and light-hearted nature of the title. The pop-up book visuals and card battles were common points of praise. Criticism focused on what some reviewers felt was the unsuccessful blending of certain elements, such as excessively challenging minigames in a children's game. The development team followed up Chocobo Tales with Final Fantasy Fables: Chocobo's Dungeon on the Wii in 2007 and a Japan-only DS sequel in 2008.

== Synopsis ==
The main protagonist is the titular Chocobo, who lives with a White Mage named Shirma, a Black Mage named Croma, and several other chocobos on a farm. The characters inhabit an island protected by four elemental crystals. The story begins when Croma brings a magical tome to the farm. After unlocking the book, the protagonists discover that it is a living evil book named Darkmaster Bebuzzu. The villain immediately captures most of the chocobos, trapping them inside picture books scattered around the island. During Chocobo's journey to save his friends, he encounters several other antagonists: Irma, a strict chocobo trainer who plans to use Bebuzzu to conquer the world; the Jailbirds, Irma's gang of chocobos; and Greeble, Peekaboo, and Volg, the strongest of Irma's chocobo gang.

== Gameplay ==
Battles take place as pop-up duels with the combat occurring on the top screen and the cards used in the exchange on the bottom screen. On the left, Chocobo uses his sword card, Ragnarok, against the antagonist Bebuzzu's Ifrit card on the right. The characters' life meters appear in opposite corners of the top screen.

Chocobo Tales is an adventure game with role-playing video game elements. The player controls the eponymous Chocobo to explore a 3D environment searching for pictures book that contain minigames. Additional gameplay includes microgames, which are short optional games found outside pictures books, and Pop-up Duels, which are turn-based card battles. Minigames feature settings and premises inspired by Aesop's Fables and Grimms' Fairy Tales. For example, "The Adamatoise and the Cactuar" is based on "The Tortoise and the Hare" but features Final Fantasy creatures racing in place of the Aesop characters; similarly, "The Boy Who Cried Leviathan" is derived from "The Boy Who Cried Wolf". Minigames are played a variety of methods; some games use the console's touchscreen controls whereas others use the microphone. While microgames do not impact the story, the player can earn additional cards for use in pop-up battles, with higher scores rewarding the player with better cards.

Combat against antagonists and bosses occurs via pop-up duels that take the form of strategic exchanges between cards. Both sides in the duel have a deck of cards, and they take turns drawing cards to play against their opponent. The player will receive a deck of cards early in the game, which they can customize with cards they collect. Cards have different attributes—color, zones, and abilities—that are combined to determine the outcome of individual exchanges. The zones can contain an icon, either a sword to attack or a shield to defend, that can initiate specific actions depending on the corresponding zone on the opponent's card. For example, if both sides play a card with an attack icon in the yellow zone, both sides will receive half damage; however, if the opponent plays a card with a blank yellow zone instead, the player would successfully attack them at full strength. Abilities determine the amount of damage dealt and can apply status effects that enhance attacks.

Chocobo Tales features wireless modes as well. Players can compete against each other in pop-up duels, minigames, or microgames. The first two modes can connect either through local wireless or Nintendo Wi-Fi; each player must have a game cartridge. The microgames can shared with a single cartridge via the DS Download Play. Pop-up cards can also be obtained from DS Download Stations.

== Development ==
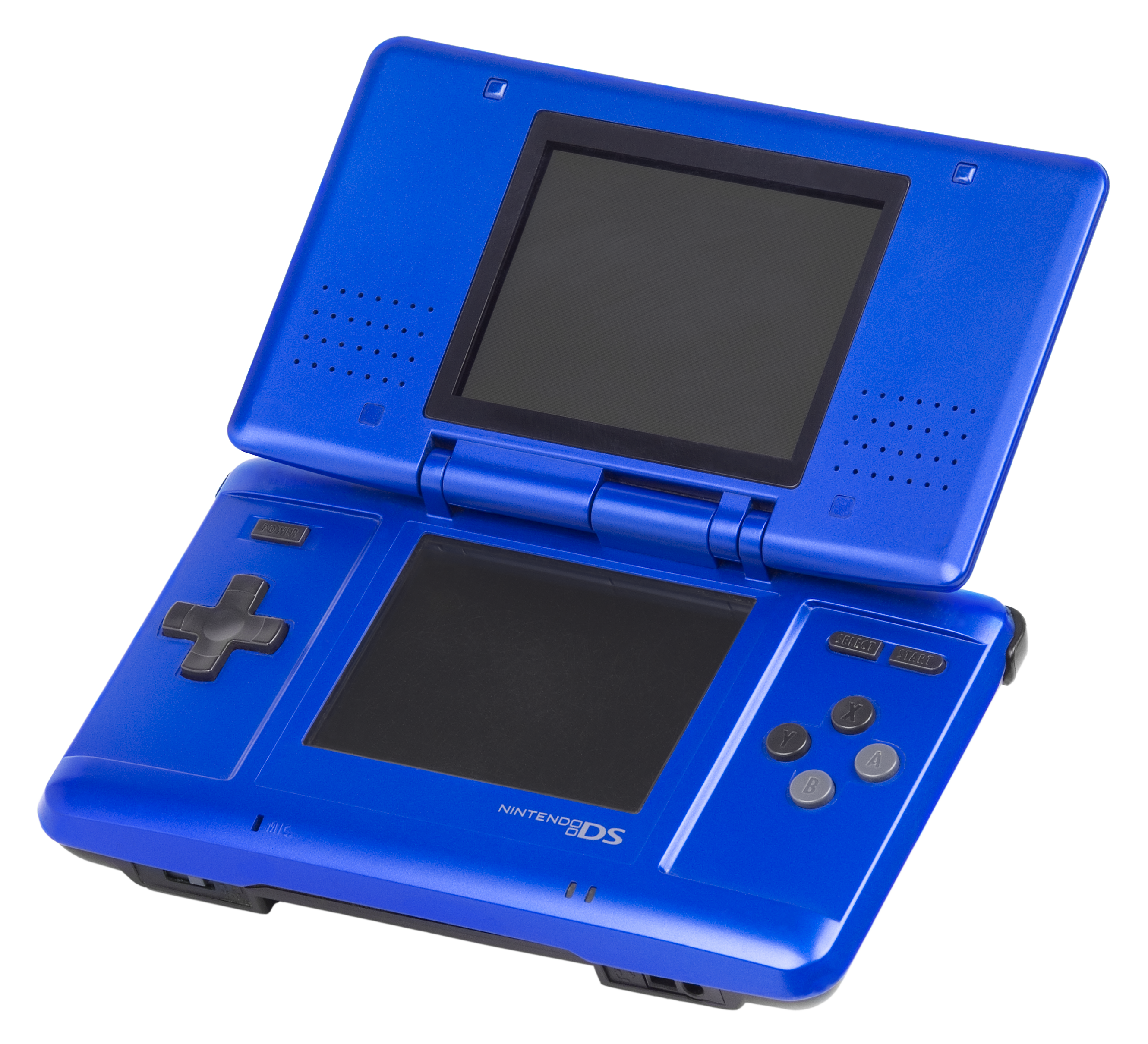
Chocobo Tales was developed exclusively for the Nintendo DS (pictured) to reach a younger audience and to take advantage of the system's touchscreen capabilities.

Chocobo Tales was developed by h.a.n.d. and published by Square Enix. Yuki Yokoyama served as the game's producer, his first time in the role. A team of around 20 staff members completed Chocobo Tales in a year. After deciding to create a game about chocobos, the team examined Square Enix's market research, which showed that chocobos are most popular among younger players. As a result, the developers chose to design the game for the Nintendo DS handheld console, a popular system with that age group. Furthermore, the producer felt that the handheld console was a good choice because it was a leading system in the market that allowed them to be innovative. To that end, the team wanted to utilize the system's stylus in the gameplay. Because the Nintendo DS hardware had memory and graphical limitations compared to home consoles, Yokoyama was able to keep the team smaller. Additionally, development tasks did not need to be divided much among the team.

In designing the visuals, Yokoyama aimed to portray the graphics as "warm and fuzzy" in order to match the chocobo's reputation. However, the developers presented some aspects of the visuals more realistically as a juxtaposition; for example, the background in the pop-up duels are realistic to inject tension during the battles. Toshiyuki Itahana, who had designed the chocobos from the previous Chocobo spin-off games, returned to produce the art for Chocobo Tales. The designs retained the rounded cute appearance he developed from the first title, Chocobo's Mysterious Dungeon. Itahana created the designs by retaining the silhouette of the original chocobo and enhancing the characteristic elements like the beak, crest, and talons.

h.a.n.d. approached Joe Down Studio in Sapporo about producing the game's music as the two companies had a long working relationship. Composer Yuzo Takahashi arranged the title's music, which includes arrangements of various Chocobo themes and Final Fantasy tracks. The only original song Takahashi composed for the soundtrack was "Irma's Theme" for the eponymous antagonist. Takahashi drew inspiration for the song from Itahana's artwork. Yasuhiro Yamanaka programmed the tracks to play on the Nintendo DS. Because the Nintendo DS hardware is not as powerful as console systems, the tracks could not be streamed at high quality and instead had to be compressed in order to play on the handheld system.

== Marketing and release ==
Square Enix submitted a trademark request for the game's title with the Japan Patent Office on July 18, 2006. A few weeks later in August 2006, the company publicly announced Chocobo Tales. Initial details revolved around the main chocobo character, the opening sequence of the story, and the picture book worlds. Only a Japanese release in the winter was publicized at the time. A week following the initial announcement, further details pertaining to the story and pop-up duels were released. Ahead of the 2006 Tokyo Game Show, Square Enix publicized its plan to have a playable demonstration of Chocobo Tales among its titles on display. At the Japanese trade show in September, the company placed the Chocobo Tales demo in the Final Fantasy section of its exhibit. The demo showcased three of the title's minigames. In addition, Square Enix made one of the minigames available for download onto Nintendo DS consoles and provided Chocobo-themed bags as prizes. The company also announced that the game would use Nintendo Wi-Fi Connection and that some minigames were multiplayer.

Leading up to its December release, Chocobo Tales's marketing included an art contest in November. Contestants could either complete a coloring page from the game's website for the coloring category or submit any media—such as a picture or music piece—in a free category. In December, the company aired a television commercial titled "Just a Little More" (Note: もうチョコっと 篇, Mō chokotto-hen) featuring Japanese model Akiko Kikuchi and placed large wall advertisements in various railway stations in Tokyo, including popular stations in Shinjuku, Shibuya, and Ikebukuro. The advertisements featured yellow Chocobo feathers shaped like talismans that passersby could peel off to take with them. To promote the game's launch, a Chocobo mascot was at the Yodobashi Camera Shinjuku West Exit Game & Hobby Hall and the Bic Camera Yūrakuchō Main Store in Tokyo posing for pictures with fans and giving Chocobo-themed bags to customers who bought the game. Additionally, some of the title's minigames were available for download in the stores, which had yellow Chocobo Tales posters and decorations.

Square Enix continued to promote Chocobo Tales after its Japanese release. The week following the release, the company announced a competition titled "Shiroma Memorial (GIII)". (Note: シロマ記念 (GIII), Shiroma Kinen (GIII)) Players could submit their top scores in four minigames for prizes. Soon afterward, it ran a sweepstake titled "Chocobo's Little Present", (Note: チョコボのチョコっとプレゼント, Chocobo no Chokotto to Purezento) in which customers could mail in a specific piece of the game's manual for a chance to win sets of five coloring pages drawn by Toshiyuki Itahana, the game's character designer. A second top score competition titled "GII Chroma Stakes" (Note: GIIクロマステークス, GII Kuroma Suteekusu) ran in February 2007. Square Enix also worked with Nintendo to provide special cards as downloadable content from DS Download Stations, a process that Yokoyama felt went smoothly. While he hoped to provide a variety of downloads to make players happy, the service limited the type and duration of content that was available.

=== Outside Japan ===
Because of the amount of language information inherent to the genre, role-playing games had historically taken a long time to localize to territories outside Japan. Realizing the frustration the delay causes fans, Square Enix aimed to reduce the localization time for its handheld titles at the time like Chocobo Tales. The publisher filed the stylized English logo for Chocobo Tales with the United States Patent and Trademark Office on December 28, 2006. A few months after its Japanese release, Square Enix announced that it would publish Chocobo Tales in North America. In addition to the April release date, the company announced the game's English title and ESRB rating. As part of the localization, the original Japanese cover art was changed for Western audiences. Because the game's target audience was younger and less familiar with chocobos, Patrick Cervantes, a manager of marketing communications with Square Enix, felt the Japanese cover would be insufficient to stay competitive at attracting new customers. In creating new cover art, the company included elements to convey more about the storyline and characters in order to have mass appeal with both new players and Final Fantasy fans.

At a press conference at its headquarters on May 13, 2007, Square Enix announced its intent to release Chocobo Tales in Europe. After the press conference, the company held its Square Enix Party event at the Makuhari Messe convention center. Among the promotions at the convention was a rare card for pop-up battles available for download. Later that month, it was revealed that Ubisoft would publish the game along with Final Fantasy III in Australia, New Zealand, and select European regions in late May 2007; Square Enix's European subsidiary published it in most European countries. In mid-May, the subsidiary announced the May 24 release date. Days after the European release, Square Enix attended the MCM London Expo to showcase several of its new games, including Chocobo Tales. The company's European marketing director, David Dyett, saw the expo as an opportunity to reach fans.

== Reception ==
Reception

Aggregate score
Aggregator	Score
Metacritic	75/100

Review scores
Publication	Score
Edge	4/10
Electronic Gaming Monthly	6.33/10 (Note: Electronic Gaming Monthly had three reviewers provide scores for the game, one critic rated it 6/10 while the rest rated it 6.5/10.)
Game Informer	6.5/10
GameSpot	8/10
GameSpy	3.5/5
GameZone	8.2/10
IGN	8.3/10
Nintendo Power	7/10
RPGamer	3.5/5

Chocobo Tales sold over 78,000 units in Japan by the end of 2006, just over two weeks after release, placing it the 186th title of the year in terms of sales. Square Enix reported that the game had sold 100,000 units in Europe and 70,000 units in North America by November 2007. The title received "generally favorable reviews" from critics, according to review aggregator Metacritic. Several publications drew comparisons to Dragon Quest Heroes: Rocket Slime, another mascot-themed game that Square Enix released the year before.

RPGamer's Michael Cunningham praised Chocobo Tales's uniqueness and variety of gaming options. He further described it as a fresh spin that builds on the world of the Final Fantasy series. Conversely, Edge magazine staff referred to the game as a "decent effort". While they complimented the visuals, the publication considered the execution and appeal "limited". In its review, the magazine staff praised the combination of 3D models and crayon-styled pop-up sprites. However, they questioned the need for a game starring a superfluous character like a chocobo. In praising the title's variety, Craig Harris of IGN called Chocobo Tales a "surprisingly fun and engaging experience". GameSpot's Kevin VanOrd wrote that while Chocobo Tales appears to be a children's game, the "saccharine visuals" hide quality gameplay for all ages. He further commented that Final Fantasy enthusiasts would enjoy the numerous cameos. Writing for Nintendo Power magazine, Steve Thomason praised the audiovisuals, calling the pop-up book aesthetic "charming" and the soundtrack "pleasing". He summarized his review stating that both fans of the Final Fantasy series and newcomers would find the game enjoyable. A reviewer for GamePro magazine echoed similar statements about the appeal to long-time series fans, noting that while it may appear to be a "quickie cash-in", the game is an "interesting addition to the franchise". Three Electronic Gaming Monthly reviewers—Ray Barnholt, Michael Donahoe, and Shane Bettenhausen—rated the title average scores and praised the presentation as well as the use of the system's inputs. However, they criticized how the developers combined a role playing game and a minigame collection, writing that Chocobo Tales contained too much "filler" and lacked depth.

The gameplay of the minigames and pop-up duels were well received. Harris called the card battles "simple yet challenging" and the mini-games "well-designed" as well as "fun". He further praised the ability to replay the mini-games alone and with others via the DS Download Play Benjamin Turner of GameSpy praised the card battles and the variety of minigames. He described the difficulty level as "perfect", noting that the minigames do not hinder progressing through the story line while obtaining gold medals in every minigame proved challenging. Cunningham praised the amount of minigames and called the card battling system "impressive". While he criticized inaccurate touchscreen controls for some minigames, the reviewer commended the overall use of the Nintendo DS's unique technology to control the gameplay. VanOrd echoed similar comments. While he described some minigames as "unnecessarily frustrating", the reviewer noted that those were in the minority and most were great. VanOrd called the microgames more simple but commented that their level of difficulty could be "maddening". The Edge reviewer was split on these elements. They considered the minigames the low point of the game, calling them "crippled forms of better games". However, they complimented the card battles, writing that while simple, the combat is "quite a bit fun". In reviewing the gameplay, Thomason noted that the game's required objectives are easy because of the younger audience. However, he commented that the optional elements are challenging for even seasoned players. GamePro's reviewer lauded the diversity of the minigames as well as how easy they are to learn. Joe Juba of Game Informer lamented Chocobo Tales's entertainment value, calling the minigames "half-baked diversions". In describing the card battles, he praised the strategy they brought to the game but criticized the amount of effort required to obtain the best cards from the minigames. Andrew Reiner provided a second opinion that echoed much of Juba's gameplay complaints, calling the minigames "desultory" and the card battles too slow.

The story received mixed reviews. Some critics enjoyed it while others referred to it as childish. Turner commented that the story was filled with "one-note" characters, calling it predictable and clichéd. Although Cunningham described the lighthearted story as "simple, yet charming", he wrote that it is also "short and shallow". While noting that the story is neither "huge" nor "elaborate", Harris nonetheless commented that Chocobo Tales is surprisingly enjoyable for older players. Thomason called the story "fairly elementary" but praised its writing, calling it "genuinely sweet" at times. Despite Chocobo Tales's young audience, the GamePro reviewer praised the story for tying the minigames together in a way that hearkened back to older Final Fantasy titles. While urging players to purchase the game, Natalie Romano of GameZone called the story "endearing" and "appealing", noting that players would become engrossed. Conversely, Juba called the story "insipid".

The game has received a positive retrospective reception as well. In Ars Technica's year-end review of 2007 video games, writer Frank Caron listed Chocobo Tales as the 2007 game he fell in love with, citing the audio-visuals, the "strong collection" of minigames, and the surprisingly fun card battles. In 2008, IGN staff listed the game as the eighth greatest mini-game collection on the Nintendo Wii or DS, citing its style, variety, and connections to the story. Writing for Siliconera in 2024, Jenni Lada ranked Chocobo Tales as the "Best of the Final Fantasy Chocobo Game Spin-offs", citing the unique aesthetic, lighthearted sense of humor, and sound gameplay.

== Legacy ==
Yokoyama would go on to produce more Chocobo games. In creating Final Fantasy Fables: Chocobo's Dungeon on the Wii, he aimed to include elements from Chocobo Tales that were well received. Square Enix released the game in 2007. A sequel titled Chocobo to Mahō no Ehon: Majō to Shōjo to Gonin no Yūsha (Note: チョコボと魔法の絵本 魔女と少女と5人の勇者; lit. '"Chocobo and the Magic Picture Book: The Witch, the Girl, and the Five Heroes"') was released in Japan on December 11, 2008. Shortly after the sequel's release, Square Enix published a two CD set of the Chocobo Tales games' soundtracks, which consists of 61 songs. The company later released the album, along with many other Final Fantasy albums, on streaming services in 2019. On December 24, 2008, Square Enix announced that they had opened a beta version of Pop-up Duel Online, (Note: ポップアップデュエル オンライン, Poppu Appu Dyueru Onrain) which was a browser version of the card-based pop-up duels from the Chocobo Tales games. The online game was open to participants of the company's Square Enix Members program; registrants also received an in-game costume for their avatar. Service for Pop-up Duel Online officially began on April 6, 2009, with access still restricted to Square Enix Members. In addition to competing in duels, players could watch others duel, collect cards, and participate in tournaments.
