= Mystery Dungeon =

Video game series

- The Mystery Dungeon logo used in Pokémon Mystery Dungeon; each series has a different logo
- Genres: Roguelike, Role-playing
- Developer: Spike Chunsoft (formerly Chunsoft)
- Publisher: Spike Chunsoft (formerly Chunsoft)
- Creators: Koichi Nakamura; Seiichiro Nagahata
- Platforms: Super Famicom; Nintendo 64; Wii; Game Boy; Game Boy Color; Game Boy Advance; Nintendo DS; Nintendo 3DS; Nintendo Switch; PlayStation; PlayStation 2; PlayStation Portable; PlayStation Vita; PlayStation 4; PlayStation 5; Xbox Series X and Series S; WonderSwan; Dreamcast; mobile devices; Windows
- First release: Torneko's Great Adventure; September 19, 1993
- Latest release: Dragon Quest Heroes: Torneko's Mystery Dungeon -Classic HD- September 9, 2026
- Parent series: Dragon Quest
- Spin-offs: Shiren Monsters; Pokémon Mystery Dungeon

Mystery Dungeon, known in Japan as Fushigi no Dungeon, (Note: Japanese: 不思議(ふしぎ)のダンジョン, Hepburn: Fushigi no Danjon; lit. "Mystery Dungeon") is a series of roguelike role-playing video games. Most were developed by Chunsoft, now Spike Chunsoft since the merging in 2012, and select games were developed by other companies with Chunsoft's permission. The series began when co–creator of Dragon Quest, Koichi Nakamura, was inspired by Seiichiro Nagahata's experience with Rogue, who is also a fellow developer from the company, and a desire to create an original series. It began on the Super Famicom, progressing to almost all of Nintendo's and Sony's home and handheld consoles, WonderSwan, Dreamcast, Windows, Xbox Series X and Series S, and mobile devices.

The series has inspired other entries in Japan and has moderate popularity, mostly from crossover entries with the Dragon Quest, Chocobo, and Pokémon Mystery Dungeon series. Despite the moderate popularity of the franchise, there have been numerous manga, anime, and novels published under it, whether they are coming from the company's original series, Shiren the Wanderer, or across many crossovers.

The premise of most Mystery Dungeon games is to play a silent protagonist who travels across the world to discover mysterious dungeons that have randomly generated rooms and never have the same patterns upon entering into it more than once, with the protagonist sometimes accompanied by a group of party members or going alone. Though it is relatively inspired of older roguelike games, like NetHack, the franchise had a few unique gameplay elements that would appear in future titles; one such is rescuing other players online via a generated password. Since its debut in 1993, the franchise maintains a strong cult following for its challenging yet rewarding difficulty and how it appeals to hardcore RPG fans as a whole.

== Games ==
Release timeline
1993	Torneko's Great Adventure
1994
1995	Mystery Dungeon 2: Shiren the Wanderer
1996	BS Shiren the Wanderer
1996	Shiren the Wanderer GB: Monster of Moonlight Village
1997	Chocobo's Mysterious Dungeon
1998	Chocobo's Dungeon 2
1999	Torneko: The Last Hope
2000	Shiren the Wanderer 2: Shiren's Castle and the Oni Invasion
2001	Shiren the Wanderer GB2: Magic Castle of the Desert
2002	Torneko's Great Adventure 3
2002	Shiren the Wanderer Gaiden: Asuka the Swordswoman
2003
2004	The Nightmare of Druaga
2005	Pokémon Mystery Dungeon: Red and Blue Rescue Team
2006	Dragon Quest: Young Yangus and the Mystery Dungeon
2007	Pokémon Mystery Dungeon: Explorers of Time and Darkness
2007	Final Fantasy Fables: Chocobo's Dungeon
2008	Shiren the Wanderer
2009	Pokémon Mystery Dungeon: Explorers of Sky
2009	Pokémon Mystery Dungeon: Adventure Team
2010	Shiren the Wanderer 4: The Eye of God and the Devil's Navel
2010	Shiren the Wanderer: The Tower of Fortune and the Dice of Fate
2011
2012	Pokémon Mystery Dungeon: Gates to Infinity
2013–2014
2015	Etrian Mystery Dungeon
2015	Mystery Chronicle: One Way Heroics
2015	Pokémon Super Mystery Dungeon
2016
2017	Etrian Mystery Dungeon 2
2018
2019	Chocobo's Mystery Dungeon Every Buddy!
2020	Pokémon Mystery Dungeon: Rescue Team DX
2021–2023
2024	Shiren the Wanderer: The Mystery Dungeon of Serpentcoil Island
2025
2026	Dragon Quest Heroes: Torneko's Mystery Dungeon -Classic HD-

Although all games in the series bear the Fushigi no Dungeon moniker somewhere in their Japanese titles, only the Shiren the Wanderer games contain original characters; all other games license their characters from other role-playing game franchises. The first game, Torneko's Great Adventure, stars a shopkeeper character from the same developer's Dragon Quest IV. Chunsoft has also started several lines of branded Mystery Dungeon games, starting with one featuring the Chocobo from SquareSoft's Final Fantasy series in 1997, then Bandai's Gundam, Konami's TwinBee, and Namco's Tower of Druaga series in 2004, Game Freak's Pokémon series in 2005, and Atlus's Etrian Odyssey series in 2015. Currently, One Way Heroics is the latest crossover with the series. Other games that are not developed or published by the company but use the same moniker have also appeared throughout the years, namely the Touhou Project series with its spin-offs titled Fushigi no Gensokyo.

=== Spin-offs ===
Shiren Monsters: Netsal, released in 2004, was the first spin-off game in the franchise, and it features characters based on the monsters from the Shiren the Wanderer series. Its gameplay was notably changed to the sports genre, specifically toward association football, compared to the main series' roguelike genre.

Pokémon Mystery Dungeon has been part of the franchise since 2005 and serves as a crossover between Pokémon and Mystery Dungeon. It was turned into its own spin-off series due to its worldwide popularity.

== Gameplay ==
Most Mystery Dungeon games center around exploring a dungeon with randomly generated layouts and fights. These are in a turn-based manner, where the player's every action such as attacking or walking, is met by the opponents' action. Chunsoft described the gameplay as being like chess. Escape from the dungeon is usually only allowed in certain places, or through the use of certain items. When the player loses the game, the player loses all money and half the items in the more forgiving variants, or loses everything and has to start from scratch in others. An effort has also been made to expand the series' gameplay features, such as adding job systems to some games, and giving each dungeon a different feel and goal. Features distinct to the Shiren the Wanderer series include the "Melding Jar" which allows players to synthesize items and weapons into more powerful ones. The Chocobo games further simplify the genre's difficulty to appeal to a wider and younger audience.

Nakamura explained that the appeal of the Mystery Dungeon series is that every game is different and that players' skills are constantly being challenged, which helps the player feel deeply involved. Seiichiro Nagahata, who supervised and planned the development of Shiren the Wanderer DS, explained that the Mystery Dungeon series is all about "tension" and "reasoning".

== Development ==
During the 1990s, the computer role-playing game genre became famous in Japan due to the success of the Dragon Quest series. However, most of the roguelike games that were published for PC used to not have a Japanese translation; the genre's recognition remained low in result. While following the basic game system of roguelike games, other companies tried to bring the genre into a home console. Two of the earliest-known attempts were Sega's Fatal Labyrinth and Dragon Crystal, both games released in 1990, but which lacked the depth of a typical computer-based roguelike. Neither proved to be successful games.

=== Dragon Quest ===
After the launch of the Super Famicom and finishing development for Dragon Quest V, the company ceased working on the Dragon Quest series and began working on the Mystery Dungeon series. The series was based on the 1980s game Rogue, which has spawned its own genre called roguelike. For a week Koichi Nakamura, founder of Chunsoft and co-creator of the Dragon Quest series, played Rogue at the recommendation of a colleague, Seiichiro Nagahata, trying to understand the game's appeal, and concluded the high degree of challenge made the game very rewarding. While working on a roguelike game for the Super Famicom, the team decided to use characters from a recognizable franchise in Japan. Koichi Nakamura has asked Yuji Horii, scenarist and creator of the Dragon Quest series, about the possibility to add characters and items from the franchise, including Torneko, the merchant appearing in Chunsoft's previous work Dragon Quest IV, only to have the permission accepted soon after.

Torneko no Daibōken: Fushigi no Dungeon was published in 1993 and became the first video game to bear the "Mystery Dungeon" moniker. Even if it sold less than the series' main titles, the game has sold over 800,000 copies. Koichi Nakamura conceived the series as Chunsoft's first original work. The game spawned two sequels starring Torneko, Torneko: The Last Hope in 1999 and Dragon Quest Characters: Torneko no Daibōken 3 in 2002, and a follow-up, Dragon Quest: Shōnen Yangus to Fushigi no Dungeon in 2006, where Torneko would appear as a cameo instead of the protagonist. And indeed, the game became the first of the over thirty Mystery Dungeon rogue-like series.

=== Shiren the Wanderer ===
The company wanted to work on the new features and gameplay mechanics added in NetHack, a variant of Rogue, one of them was being able to steal items from a shopkeeper. However, it was not possible to translate the new content from NetHack with characters from the Dragon Quest series; one such with Torneko who is a merchant. Two years after the release of Torneko no Daibōken, Mystery Dungeon 2: Shiren the Wanderer was released as the company's second work for the Mystery Dungeon series, with a new world setting and unique characters.

Many titles from this series were developed simultaneously throughout the years, where one title was focused on creating original features in its gameplay than the other for which they were forced to focus on "traditional dungeon types" due to the limitations on the other hardware; Mystery Dungeon 2: Shiren the Wanderer on Super Famicom and Shiren the Wanderer GB: Monster of Moonlight Village on Game Boy, and Shiren the Wanderer 2: Shiren's Castle and the Oni Invasion on Nintendo 64 and Shiren the Wanderer GB2: Magic Castle of the Desert on Game Boy Color. The success of the first game in Japan helped key employees that participated in the aforementioned game's development return to work on the series' future titles throughout the years, such as character artist Kaoru Hasegawa, supervisor Seiichiro Nagahata, and scenarist Shin-ichiro Tomie.

A unique gameplay element that first appeared in Magic Castle of the Desert and would appear later in the Mystery Dungeon franchise and its crossovers is rescuing other players via passwords. They went with this idea instead of using the Game Boy's Game Link Cable because there were not many owners of the cable. This idea was expanded in Shiren the Wanderer Gaiden: Asuka the Swordswoman with the addition of online support. Within the online support, players would receive new dungeons, called either "Weekly Dungeon"; a dungeon that can be played online on a weekly basis, or "Challenge Dungeon"; the dungeon's difficulty would be increased and useful items would appear less frequently.

=== Chocobo ===
The Chocobo's Mystery Dungeon series is fully developed and published by Square Enix, then SquareSoft before the merging with Enix. However, Nakamura has supervised the first two games and was the producer for Chocobo's Mysterious Dungeon, before Hironobu Sakaguchi took the place for Chocobo's Dungeon 2. Chocobo's Mystery Dungeon would become the first title to be released in the Chocobo sub-series, while Chocobo's Dungeon 2 became the first Mystery Dungeon title to be released outside of Japan. Starting in Final Fantasy Fables: Chocobo's Dungeon, some of the more difficult game elements were removed so that it would appeal to "small children and female" players.

=== Pokémon ===
Tsunekazu Ishihara had worked previously with Chunsoft with Tetris 2 + BomBliss as the producer, and met Nakamura, who was the game's director. Prior to the development of Pokémon Mystery Dungeon: Red and Blue Rescue Team, Ishihara had played a few games from the Mystery Dungeon series, namely Torneko's Great Adventure: Mystery Dungeon, and was impressed with the genre's depth and quality. The game's development started after Nagahata and Tomie approached Ishihara and agreed to work on an easier version of the genre for the mainline Pokémon fans. During the development of Red and Blue Rescue Team, Kouji Malta, one of the programmers for these two games, who had contributed previously on EarthBound and Shiren the Wanderer 2, stated the company went through bad business performance, as employees from Chunsoft would leave the company progressively due to this issue. The game's success not only helped gain more popularity for the franchise, it also helped Chunsoft to avoid bankruptcy.

The widespread success of the first game helped creating a spin-off series, with it selling over 10 million copies four years after its first titles were released in Japan. Unlike the Dragon Quest branch, it does not have a linear timeline between the mainline Pokémon franchise and this series so newcomers would be introduced easily into the series and the genre.

=== Etrian Odyssey ===
The game was developed by Spike Chunsoft and Atlus, the latter being the developers of the Etrian Odyssey series, with most of the actual development done at Spike Chunsoft, while Atlus acted as supervisors. During development, both the companies would continuously share their most recent data on a shared server, and discuss details of the game direction using an instant messaging program; additionally, they would hold weekly meetings during which they made various arrangements for the game, and every month during development, Spike Chunsoft would send their latest playable build to Atlus, who would check the direction the game was going in.

== Music ==
Though the franchise is divided with numerous crossovers, the majority of its soundtracks were composed by late Koichi Sugiyama, and Hayato Matsuo for the Dragon Quest crossovers and Shiren the Wanderer series. Sugiyama made use of japanese elements for the Shiren the Wanderer series, compared to his more European-styled Dragon Quest compositions, using instruments such as a shakuhachi flute. This theme would remain for the series' next titles.

Other composers such as Yuzo Koshiro for the Etrian Odyssey crossover or Keisuke Ito and Arata Iiyoshi for the Pokémon crossover have frequently contributed in the franchise. In addition to new compositions, tracks from previous mainline titles would also be featured in some of the crossover's titles, one example being the Dragon Quest crossover with tracks from the mainline games playing in these titles, in majority being from Dragon Quest IV or Dragon Quest VIII. Etrian Mystery Dungeon would includes arranged music from previous Etrian Odyssey games. Joe Down Studio developed the music for Final Fantasy Fables: Chocobo's Dungeon and featured extensive remixing of music from various Final Fantasy games due to the positive reception of remixed Final Fantasy music in the game Final Fantasy Fables: Chocobo Tales, and requested that they be allowed to use music from the early Final Fantasy titles as it would be appropriate to the theme of forgotten time.

== Other media ==
=== Books ===
One of the few novels that were related to this franchise was an adaptation of Mystery Dungeon 2: Shiren the Wanderer's story, with a title that translates to Shiren the Wanderer: Flowers Dancing in the Golden Town Amteca, released in December 2004. However, many manga were released for many crossovers of the franchise, ranging from Dragon Quest to Pokémon. One such is a manga titled Pokémon Mystery Dungeon: Ginji's Rescue Team, a 6-part manga based on the video games Pokémon Mystery Dungeon: Red and Blue Rescue Team that first appeared in Japan's CoroCoro Comic in December 2005.

=== Anime ===
There exist anime adaptation of the Pokémon Mystery Dungeon series since its debut. The first anime adaptation was titled Pokémon Mystery Dungeon: Team Go-Getters Out Of The Gate!. It is based on Pokémon Mystery Dungeon: Red and Blue Rescue Team, and was aired in Japan on September 8, 2006. This episode follows the beginning of the game's main story. Another special episode, this time based on Pokémon Mystery Dungeon: Explorers of Time and Darkness, was first broadcast in Japan on September 9, 2007, as part of Pokémon Sunday. A sequel episode, Pokémon Mystery Dungeon: Explorers of Sky - Beyond Time & Darkness was first broadcast in Japan later on April 12, 2009, also as part of Pokémon Sunday. Both adaptation follow the beginning and the next-to-last chapters of the game's main story.

=== Mobile ===
Other variations notably inspired by the mystery dungeon series are Pixel Dungeon, which was released in 2012, and Labyrinth of the Witch which was released in 2019.

== Reception ==
The Mystery Dungeon series can be seen as moderately popular in Japan, whereas the overseas community has a smaller following of dedicated fans. The Shiren the Wanderer series has been both praised and criticized for its difficulty, and generally noted for the uneven quality of the randomly generated levels, or "floors", the games produce. The series, along with its main protagonist Shiren, appeared in video games that were developed or published by Spike Chunsoft, with games like Crypt of the NecroDancer, Terraria, or 428: Shibuya Scramble. Passionate fans of the Shiren the Wanderer series are commonly called "Shi-Ranger" in Japan.

Other Japanese role-playing games would incorporate random dungeon generation as part of their design, mimicking part of the nature of roguelikes, and were considered roguelike titles when published in Western markets. Such titles include Azure Dreams, Dark Cloud, Shining Soul, and Baroque. The massively multiplayer online role playing game Final Fantasy XIV added a randomly-generated Deep Dungeon that was inspired by the procedural generation of roguelikes.

=== Ratings ===
The Shiren the Wanderer series has generally favorable ratings in Japan and throughout the world. Famitsu awarded a 36/40 to Shiren's Castle and the Oni Invasion and a 38/40 to the original release of Magic Castle of the Desert, the highest score the publication had given to a Game Boy Color game.

=== Sales ===
As of 2026, a grand total of 25.33 million copies across the franchise have been sold, the majority of which are in the Pokémon Mystery Dungeon series. (Note: Mystery Dungeon series: Dragon Quest Mystery Dungeon series: 2.55 million (Note: Torneko's Great Adventure series: Torneko's Great Adventure: Mystery Dungeon: 0.8 million; World of Dragon Warrior: Torneko: The Last Hope: 0.76 million; Torneko: The Last Hope: 0.58 million (Japan); Torneko's Great Adventure 2 Advance: 0.18 million; Dragon Quest Characters: Torneko's Great Adventure 3: Mystery Dungeon: 0.65 million; Torneko's Great Adventure 3: 0.51 million; Torneko's Great Adventure 3 Advance: 0.14 million; Other: Dragon Quest: Young Yangus and the Mysterious Dungeon: 0.34 million); Shiren the Wanderer series: 3 million (Note: Shiren the Wanderer series: Mystery Dungeon: Shiren the Wanderer: 0.52 million; Mystery Dungeon 2: Shiren the Wanderer: 0.23 million; Shiren the Wanderer DS: 0.2 million (Japan); Shiren the Wanderer (iOS/Android): 0.1 million; Shiren the Wanderer GB: Monster of Moonlight Village: 0.1 million; Shiren the Wanderer 2: Shiren's Castle and the Oni Invasion: 0.28 million; Shiren the Wanderer: Magic Castle of the Desert: 0.28 million; Shiren the Wanderer GB2: 0.17 million; Shiren the Wanderer DS2: 0.1 million; Shiren the Wanderer Gaiden: Asuka the Swordswoman: 0.05 million; Shiren Monsters: Netsal: 0.03 million; Shiren the Wanderer 3: The Sleeping Princess and the Karakuri Mansion: 0.14 million; Shiren the Wanderer 3: 0.11 million (Japan); Shiren the Wanderer 3 Portable: 0.03 million; Shiren the Wanderer 4: The Eye of God and the Devil's Navel: 0.11 million; Shiren the Wanderer 4: 0.1 million; Shiren the Wanderer 4 Plus: 0.02 million; Shiren the Wanderer: The Tower of Fortune and the Dice of Fate: 0.5 million; Shiren the Wanderer: The Mystery Dungeon of Serpentcoil Island: 0.3 million); Chocobo's Mystery Dungeon series: 2.25 million (Note: Chocobo's Mystery Dungeon series: Chocobo's Mysterious Dungeon: 1.34 million; Chocobo's Mysterious Dungeon: 1.17 million; Chocobo's Mysterious Dungeon for WonderSwan: 0.18 million; Chocobo's Dungeon 2: 0.59 million (Japan); Chocobo's Dungeon 3: 0.31 million; Final Fantasy Fables: Chocobo's Dungeon: 0.17 million; Japan sales: 0.1 million; US sales: 0.07 million; Cid and Chocobo's Mysterious Dungeon: Labyrinth of Forgotten Time DS+: 0.07 million; Chocobo's Mystery Dungeon Every Buddy!: 0.07 million; Nintendo Switch: 0.04 million (Japan); PlayStation 4: 0.03 million (Japan)); Pokémon Mystery Dungeon series: 17.26 million (Note: Pokémon Mystery Dungeon series: Pokémon Mystery Dungeon: Red and Blue Rescue Team: 5.85 million; Red Rescue Team: 2.36 million; Blue Rescue Team: 3.49 million; Pokémon Mystery Dungeon: Explorers of Time and Darkness and Explorers of Sky: 6.37 million; Explorers of Time and Darkness: 4.88 million; Explorers of Sky: 1.49 million; Pokémon Mystery Dungeon: Gates to Infinity: 1.38 million; Pokémon Super Mystery Dungeon: 1.67 million; Pokémon Mystery Dungeon: Rescue Team DX: 1.99 million); Smaller and individual series: 0.27 million (Note: Etrian Mystery Dungeon series: Etrian Mystery Dungeon: 0.1 million (Japan); Etrian Mystery Dungeon 2: 0.04 million; Individual series: The Nightmare of Druaga: Fushigi no Dungeon: 0.07 million (Japan); Mystery Chronicle: One Way Heroics: 0.07 million; PlayStation Vita: 0.01 million; Japan sales: 5,059; US Sales: 5,000; PlayStation 4: 5,000 (North America); Steam: 0.05 million))

The Pokémon Mystery Dungeon series is known to have high sale rates among the franchise, surpassing one million copies for most of its games, and more than two million for titles like Blue Rescue Team and Red Rescue Team, and Explorers of Time, Darkness and Sky alone. Combined worldwide sales for the three Explorers games passed over 6.37 million copies according to Computer Entertainment Supplier's Association; 4.88 million for Explorers of Time and Explorers of Darkness and 1.49 million for Explorers of Sky. They are currently the best-selling games in the Pokémon Mystery Dungeon series, surpassing their predecessors. They are also the best-selling games in the Mystery Dungeon franchise in general; surpassing Squaresoft's Chocobo's Mysterious Dungeon and Enix's Torneko: The Last Hope, both accumulating 1.34 million and 759,000 copies respectively. Pokémon Mystery Dungeon: Gates to Infinity was the 18th best selling game in Japan in 2012, with more than 373,000 copies sold. The Chocobo series is thought to have had middling success, with strong launch sales but not a huge popular response.
