= Chocobo Racing =

1999 racing video game

- North American cover art
- Developer: Square
- Publishers: JP: Square; NA: Square Electronic Arts; EU: Square Europe
- Director: Takashi Tokita
- Producer: Shinji Hashimoto
- Artist: Toshiyuki Itahana
- Writer: Takashi Tokita
- Composer: Kenji Ito
- Series: Final Fantasy; Chocobo
- Platform: PlayStation
- Release: JP: March 18, 1999; NA: August 12, 1999; EU: October 11, 1999
- Genre: Racing
- Modes: Single-player, multiplayer

Chocobo Racing (Note: Known in Japan as Chocobo Racing: Genkai e no Road (チョコボレーシング 〜幻界へのロード〜, Chokobo Rēshingu 〜Genkai e no Rōdo〜; lit. "Chocobo Racing: Road to the Spirit World").) is a racing game developed and published by Square for the PlayStation, A spin-off of the Final Fantasy series and part of the Chocobo spin-off series. It was released in Japan in March 1999, followed by North America and Europe in August and October, respectively. The game's star and namesake is the Chocobo, with other figures from the Final Fantasy series, such as Mog the Moogle, the Black Mage, and Cid being part of the cast. Most of the game's soundtrack is composed using songs from previous Final Fantasy titles. As a formulaic kart racer, Chocobo Racing is often compared to Mario Kart and Crash Team Racing.

Chocobo Racing received generally average reviews, with critics citing its low quality in several aspects of gameplay. The game was later released in Japan alongside Chocobo Stallion and Dice de Chocobo as part of the Chocobo Collection. The game was re-released individually as part of the PSone Books series in December 2001. It was released in Japan as a PSOne Classic on February 10, 2009.

== Gameplay ==
In Chocobo Racing, the player controls Final Fantasy characters, most of whom race in go-karts. Other characters fly, drive scooters, ride magic carpets, or run. Players have five different racing modes to choose from: Story Mode, Versus Mode, Grand Prix, Relay Race, and Time Attack. In the Story Mode, players are guided through the story of Chocobo Racing, which is narrated by Cid, in the form of a pop-up book. Completing the Story Mode unlocks secret character racers and allows players to create a custom racer of their own. In the Versus Mode, two players can race each other on a horizontally split screen. In Grand Prix (GP) Mode, the player races computer-controlled opponents in four selected tracks of their choice. In Relay Race Mode, the player chooses three racers to compete in a relay race. In Time Attack Mode, the player can select any stage and try to beat the fastest time record set there. There are a total of ten tracks, two of which have to be unlocked by playing the story mode: Cid's Test Track, Moogle Forest, The Ancient Gate, Mythril Mines, The Black Manor, Floating Gardens, Gingerbread Land, Vulcan-O Valley, Fantasia, and F.F.VIII Circuit.

While racing, the player can accelerate, brake, reverse, activate Magic Stones, or use a "special ability" using the game controller's analog stick and buttons. An additional move is the skid, which is executed by simultaneously braking and accelerating into a turn, can be used to take sharp turns quickly. If the player skids too sharply, however, a spin out will occur. Before the start of any race, the player's character can receive a speed boost by tapping the Accelerate button with precise timing during the countdown.

In this example screenshot, the White Mage activates the "Barrier" ability that protects her from the next attack she receives. The "special ability" gauge in the upper left-hand corner of the screen will not recharge until the Barrier vanishes.

In Chocobo Racing, Magic Stones are scattered throughout each course, and can be picked up by the player by driving through them. Magic Stones can also be stolen from opponents by bumping into them from behind. The player can then activate the Magic Stone for some special effect. Activating a Haste Stone, for example, gives the character a short speed boost. Some Magic Stones stack, increasing in power if more than one of the same kind of stone is picked up by the player. Each stone is represented by a corresponding symbol on the racetrack, while stones marked with question marks grant the player a single kind of Magic Stone at random.

Special abilities are another aspect of Chocobo Racing. Before each race, the player is prompted to assign a special ability to the selected character. During a race, the player can only activate the chosen special ability when the meter in the upper left-hand corner of the screen is full. After using the special ability, the player must wait for the meter to recharge to use it again.

== Plot ==
=== Setting ===
Chocobo Racing borrows themes and elements from Final Fantasy I to VIII. The Story Mode is narrated by Cid and includes nine chapters in a pop-up book fashion with FMVs. To progress, the player needs to defeat the chapter's respective challenger. Before each chapter begins, the player is given the option of viewing the story or skipping to the race except when playing the Story Mode for the first time.

=== Characters ===
The cast of Chocobo Racing is drawn from recurring creatures and characters from the Chocobo's Dungeon and Final Fantasy series. Eight characters -- Chocobo, Mog, Golem, Goblin, Black Magician, White Mage, Chubby Chocobo, and Behemoth—are immediately available, and additional, secret characters such as Cactuar, Bahamut, Cloud, Aya, and Squall may be unlocked after completing Story Mode.

=== Story ===
Chapter one, titled "Gadgets a go-go", begins with the inventor Cid presenting Chocobo with a pair of "Jet-Blades" and offers Chocobo a chance to take a test-run with them on the racetrack behind his lab. After the race, Mog the Moogle drops in and asks Cid about the progress of the racing machine he'd commissioned. Cid promises to bring the machine by tomorrow, but later confides to Chocobo he'd forgotten it. The next day, after presenting the doubtful Mog with his scooter, Chocobo and Mog race. After Chocobo wins, Mog confronts Cid over his vehicle's poor performance, but Cid replies that Chocobo won because of the differences in their abilities (i.e., Chocobo's "Dash"). He explains that the secret of Chocobo's "Dash" ability is the Blue Crystal on his leg-ring. Mog mulls over his inferior "Flap" ability and decides he wants a Blue Crystal as well, so Cid recommends that the two go on an adventure to find out the secret of the Blue Crystal.

The two head out to discover the secret behind the Blue Crystal, meeting (and racing) many along the way. When they reach Mysidia, the village of mages, a White Mage there notices that all the companions have Magicite, which the companions had previously referred to as "Blue Crystals". The companions want to know the legend behind the Magicite shards; the White Mage agrees to tell them on the condition that they race her in the Floating Gardens, with the story as the winner's prize. Upon winning, she tells them of the legend: "There are Magicite Shards scattered all over the world. It used to be one large Magicite Crystal...But people kept fighting each other over it. So the founder of Mysidia, the great magician Ming-Wu, broke the Crystal into eight pieces. He then scattered the shards to the four winds. He did so to assure later restoration of the Magicite Crystal...when all eight pieces are brought together again".

After this discovery, the companions continue to search for other racers in possession of the crystal shards. Upon defeating Behemoth in a race, the monster joins their ranks, bringing the party's number to eight. The companions then notice that their Magicite shards begin to glow, and Mog discovers that he possessed Magicite all along. The convergence of all eight shards of the Magicite crystal fulfills Ming-Wu's prophecy, and the gate to Fantasia, the Land of the Espers, opens. When the companions arrive in Fantasia, they are greeted by Bahamut, King of the Espers. Bahamut decides to test their worth with a final trial, and welcomes their attempts to defeat him in a race. After the race, Bahamut acknowledges the powers of the group. He goes on to rhetorically ask if the companions knew why Ming-Wu broke up the Magicite, and explains the legend once more. Bahamut is pleased with the companions, noting that humans, moogles, chocobos, dragons, and monsters all came together in goodwill. In celebration, he decides to leave the portal between the world and Fantasia open, declaring that "Fantasia shall exist in harmony with your world from this day on".

Upon completion of the Story Mode, players are assigned a number of points determined by their performance, with a maximum of one hundred. Using those points, the player is given the option of creating a racer with customized color and performance. The point value is distributed among five parameters: Max Speed, Acceleration, Grip, Drift, and A.G.S., which determines how fast the racer's ability gauge charges. A maximum of twenty points can be assigned to each of the five racing parameters. Customized racers can be used in all of the game's modes except for the Story Mode, and only the main characters and Bahamut are open to customization.

== Development ==
The first demonstration of Chocobo Racing was at the Fall Tokyo Game Show '98; it was then unclear if there would be a North American release. IGN staff noted its striking similarities to Mario Kart. In the release of Chocobo's Dungeon 2, a bonus CD included a video clip of the game. Originally slated to be released in late September/October, the release date was moved to August 1999 because "it was done early, and is now ready to go". Square worked with toy company Choro Qi to produce toy cars for the release of the game.

=== Music ===
Chocobo Racing Original Soundtrack is a soundtrack album produced by Square. It was released in Japan on March 25, 1999 by DigiCube, and sold roughly 35,000 units. Almost all of the tracks are arrangements of music Nobuo Uematsu composed for Final Fantasy games, arranged by Kenji Ito. The only exception is the song played during the final song, "Treasure Chest In The Heart", which is a vocal track orchestrated by Shirō Hamaguchi and performed by Hiromi Ohta in Japanese and Vicki Bell in English.

== Reception ==
Reception

Aggregate score
Aggregator	Score
GameRankings	62%

Review scores
Publication	Score
AllGame	2/5
CNET Gamecenter	6 of 10
Electronic Gaming Monthly	6 of 10
Famitsu	30 of 40
Game Informer	6.25 of 10
GameFan	(G.N.) 87% 70% (Note: In GameFan's viewpoint of the Japanese import, three critics gave it each a score of 78, 74, and 58.)
GamePro	3/5 (Note: GamePro gave the game two 3.5/5 scores for graphics and control, 4/5 for sound, and 3/5 for overall fun factor.)
GameRevolution	C+
GameSpot	4.4 of 10
IGN	5.6 of 10
Next Generation	2/5
Official U.S. PlayStation Magazine	3/5

The game received mixed reviews according to the review aggregation website GameRankings.

Douglass C. Perry of IGN said the game was an attempt by Square to "cash in" on the popular kart racer genre created by Nintendo's successful Mario Kart. Other reviewers agreed, calling it "a tired rehash" due to its colorful but unpolished graphics, crude track designs, and poor controls. Daniel Erickson of NextGen called it "kart-racing fare" that is standard but lacks the deathmatch-type courses that made Mario Kart popular. In Japan, however, Famitsu gave it a score of 30 out of 40.

1Up.com's Final Fantasy Retro Roundup stated that it was a "decent game" ruined by the necessity of steering with a D-pad, and was rated "Not Worth It". Many similarities were noted with Mario Kart such as similar course themes and the need to "power slide". It was also called too easy, with story mode lasting only two hours and there being limited replay value except for the unlocking of secret characters and courses. Other critiques included a lack of a battle mode and limited customization. The music was thought to be average, though the last song of the story mode was "strikingly beautiful".

In Japan, the game sold 300,000 units.

== Sequels ==
In 2010, a new Chocobo Racing title, tentatively titled Codename: Chocobo Racing 3D, was announced for the Nintendo 3DS handheld system. However, in October 2013, Takashi Tokita, director of the original Chocobo Racing, confirmed that the project had been cancelled, noting that had he been part of its development process, he "would have made sure that it came out".

A new Chocobo Racing sequel, Chocobo GP, was released for the Nintendo Switch as an exclusive title on March 10, 2022.
