= Moogle =

Fictional species in the Final Fantasy video game franchise

- Final Fantasy race
- A Moogle design from Final Fantasy IX by Toshiyuki Itahana.
- First appearance: Final Fantasy III
- Created by: Koichi Ishii

Moogles (モーグリ, mōguri) are a sentient fictional species created for the Final Fantasy franchise by Square Enix (originally Square). A white-furred creature usually sporting wings and a pom-pom-tipped antenna, they were first introduced in Final Fantasy III (1990), and have since featured in various capacities in multiple mainline and spin-off Final Fantasy titles. Some Moogle characters recur in major roles, such as Mog who appears in a playable or supporting role across several mainline and spin-off games, and the moogle Montblanc from the Ivalice setting.

Moogles were created by artist and designer Koichi Ishii, based on drawings he created during his school days and inspired by an all-white koala; the name is a compound of the Japanese names for "bat" and "mole". Ishii handled the original design for Final Fantasy III, with later recurring elements created by Yoshitaka Amano in Final Fantasy VI (1994). The moogle has undergone multiple redesigns from artists including Toshiyuki Itahana and Ryoma Ito. Moogles have become a series mascot popular with series fans and journalists, and feature prominently in merchandise. Some of the Moogle's appearances have seen varied responses.

== Creation and development ==
The original Moogle design was created by Koichi Ishii, an artist and game designer who worked on the original Final Fantasy (1987) and Final Fantasy II (1988); he had earlier created the recurring Chocobo character. Ishii had designed what would become the Moogle during his elementary school days, when he drew a number of fantasy creatures. Inspired by his love for koalas, he drew the early Moogle, imagining a white koala with bat wings that would blow up its body to float and fly. The original design also included the large noses. A Moogle-like creature called a Kryon was designed for Final Fantasy II, but was ultimately reworked and renamed as the "Giant Beaver" enemy. They were dropped as no place could be found for them in the game's story, but they were incorporated into Final Fantasy III (1990) at Ishii's request.

According to the game's producer Hiromichi Tanaka, the Moogles were originally placed where they were in-game because the team "wanted someone to put in these caves". He never remembered them being significant during development, and was surprised when they took off as a series mascot. Moogles were going to be one of a trio of characters alongside the Chocobo and a third animal creation that ended up being scrapped. According to Ishii, in this trio the Moogle would have been "the spacey one, easygoing and sometimes showing a flair for comedy where it's the butt of the joke."

Unlike Chocobos, which were intended to be essentially mute, the Moogles are capable of speech; originally distinguished by a "meow" sound, by Final Fantasy V (1992) they were given a more distinct "kupo" sound. Ishii described their ability to speak as a convenience issue, so the players could be guided when they reached the Moogles' home, and attributed their dialogue to the game's writer. In a different interview, Ishii could not clearly recall the source of the name, but thought it was a compound of the Japanese words for "bat" and "mole". The Moogles' name was originally translated into English by Ted Woolsey; notably in the original release of Final Fantasy Tactics, the more literal "Mogri" was used, but was changed back to the established version for a later remake.

Since its creation, a number of other artists have created redesigns for the Moogle. When recurring Final Fantasy artist Yoshitaka Amano redesigned the Moogle for Final Fantasy VI (1994), he added narrow slit-like eyes and a pom-pom-tipped antenna. Speaking in a later interview Ishii approved of the design changes. For Final Fantasy Tactics Advance (2003), artist Ryoma Ito heavily redesigned the moogle; he recalled that the game's producer Yasumi Matsuno approved of the redesign. Other artists that have created notable Moogle redesigns include Toshiyuki Itahana (Crystal Chronicles, Mobius), Toshitaka Matsuda (XIII-2), and Yusaku Nakaaki (Type-0).

== Appearances ==
Moogles first appear in Final Fantasy III as a group of cave-dwelling creatures who guard the mage Doga. Since their later appearance in Final Fantasy V, they have featured in some capacity across multiple mainline entries. They share the general appearance of a white-furred creature with wings, with many later incarnations sporting an antenna. Across the games they have appeared as characters for saving the game, and as messengers, shopkeepers, and summoned monsters. In Final Fantasy XI, Moogles served as housekeepers for players' in-game houses, and featured in a dedicated storyline addition. They have also served as gameplay companions in Crystal Chronicles as helpers during the single-player sections, and in Chocobo's Mysterious Dungeon to serve as the voice of the mute titular character.

A recurring named Moogle character since Final Fantasy VI is Mog, who originally appears as a recruitable party member. In Final Fantasy IX, Mog is a companion to the summoner Eiko Carol and avatar of the Eidolon Madeen, while in XIII-2 and its sequel Lightning Returns Mog is a being who aided Serah Farron on her quest to find her sister Lightning. Mog also appears in spin-off titles in a variety of roles including as a support for the playable Class Zero in Type-0, a constant player companion in Crystal Chronicles, a racer and core character in Chocobo Racing, and a mentor for the lead character of Record Keeper. A notable enemy version is the "Good King Moggle Mog", a primal from Final Fantasy XIV; Moggle Mog was quickly added to the game instead of planned fights against the Primals Leviathan and Titan due to the earthquake and tsunami in 2011, as the "Tsunami" and "Earthquake" moves they used would have been in poor taste.

A different recurring Moogle character in the world of Ivalice−featured in Final Fantasy XII and some of the Tactics games−is the clan leader Montblanc, one of a set of six moogle brothers. Two named moogles that recur in both Final Fantasy IX and Crystal Chronicles are Artemicion and Stiltzkin; in Crystal Chronicles Stiltzkin is distinguished by not using "kupo" in his speech. The two moogles were created by Masahiro Kataoka, who worked on both titles. Moogles have had cameos as toys in some mainline titles for different reasons, including Final Fantasy X, XIII, and XV. A robotic moogle toy serves as the mount for Cait Sith, one of the playable characters of Final Fantasy VII (1997).

=== Crossovers and merchandise ===
Moogles have appeared in titles outside the Final Fantasy series in a number of roles. Within Square Enix's library, they have been featured in Secret of Mana (1993), the Kingdom Hearts series, Lord of Vermilion (2008), Dragon Quest X (2012), and Star Ocean: Anamnesis (2016). They have also been featured or referenced in crossovers with other titles including Mario Hoops 3-on-3 (2006), and Everybody's Golf (2017),

Examples of merchandise featuring the Moogle as iconography include stuffed toys, key chains, Christmas-themed cakes, and wedding confectionery. Square Enix partnered with a Japanese bridal company to introduce a real-life Final Fantasy wedding service that includes a giant virtual Moogle. A giant Moogle bed was created as a contest reward for the Japanese convenience store Lawson.

== Reception ==
Official Australian PlayStation Magazine stated that "nothing sums up the dichotomy of cutesiness for adult players quite like a Moogle", calling them "cool little critters who wouldn't be out of place sitting atop your computer screen at work", and also "so sickeningly cute that thoughts turn to the business end of a hammer drill". Mike Fahey of Kotaku called Moogles his "favorite video game characters ever", though he criticized their design in Final Fantasy XIII-2 as "gross". Jason Schreier of the same publication called Good King Moogle Mog "one of Final Fantasy XIV's most memorable bosses". Final Fantasy XIV's Fat Moogle mount, which was released for US$40, was seen as "exorbitant" in price by fans.

Julia Lee of Polygon praised the Moogles of Final Fantasy Crystal Chronicles, calling them "adorable cat-like creatures", but criticized them for having English voice acting, saying it "ruin[ed] their tiny adorable appearance", and calling Mog, the player's Moogle helper, "annoying". Robert Ramsey of Push Square criticized the Moogle voice acting in Final Fantasy XIII-2 and Type-0, saying "we're desperate for a return to Moogles that don't sound like they're helium enthusiasts".

In markets outside of Japan, a playable Moogle named Mog is used as a mascot for Final Fantasy VI, appearing on the game's box art and print advertisements casually holding a dagger, as well as in claymation television commercials speaking with a gruff voice to showcase the individual monsters. In his book examining Final Fantasy VI and its themes, Sebastian Deken was highly critical of how Mog was used in this manner, especially coupled with the slogans implying the game was highly difficult, an aspect also unique to Western advertising. He felt that the advertisement campaign was overall at odds with how Amano had portrayed the character in his artwork as cute and joyful, undermining both the character and the game's public perception in Western markets. He summarized the campaign as using "an adorable little cuddle-bear in a direct appeal to macho (or macho-aspiring) gamers" and "kawaii repackaged for the JV football team."

== See also ==
- Chocobo
- Cactuar
