= Chocobo's Dungeon 2 =

1998 video game

- North American version cover art
- Developer: Square
- Publishers: JP: Square; NA: Square Electronic Arts
- Director: Kazuhiko Aoki
- Producer: Hironobu Sakaguchi
- Designers: Nobuaki Komoto; Hiroshi Takahashi
- Programmer: Shin Kimura
- Composers: Kenji Ito; Yasuhiro Kawakami; Tsuyoshi Sekito; Kumi Tanioka
- Series: Chocobo; Mystery Dungeon
- Platform: PlayStation
- Release: JP: December 23, 1998; NA: December 17, 1999
- Genre: Roguelike
- Modes: Single-player, multiplayer

Chocobo's Dungeon 2 (Note: Known in Japan as Chocobo no Fushigina Dungeon 2 (Japanese: チョコボの不思議なダンジョン2, Hepburn: Chokobo no Fushigina Danjon 2; lit. Chocobo's Mysterious Dungeon 2).) is a 1998 role-playing video game developed and published by Square for the PlayStation. It is the sequel to 1997's Chocobo's Mysterious Dungeon.

== Gameplay ==
The player plays as Chocobo, navigating randomly-generated levels of mysterious dungeons to progress the story. The path to get through the maze is different every time a player goes through the same dungeon, but the same set of monsters will be encountered. Chocobo may have a partner character assisting him throughout the dungeon, which typically resolves in a boss fight. There are several partner characters, most of which will be recognizable to Final Fantasy veterans, including Cid; a young white mage girl, Shiroma; and Mog, a moogle. Though the game is an isometric 2D adventure, there are occasionally 3D cutscenes.

In the start of the game, Chocobo is only able to carry a few items in his inventory. When he dies in a dungeon, all items in the inventory are lost. While progressing through the game, the player can leave extra items in storage space rented in the town. Items in storage will not be lost if Chocobo dies. Deeper dungeons become more difficult and more powerful items are obtainable.

Combat is conducted in a turn-based manner, with player and enemy alternating their actions. Chocobo and his partner can attack in any of eight different directions. Aside from attacking, characters may also use items, spells, or character-specific abilities. These actions may be augmented by feathers, which provide special abilities such as kicking items through walls, unlocking area of effect spells, and substituting the partner with powerful summon characters.

Chocobo can also equip various claws as weapons and saddles as armor. Claws and saddles may be combined in stoves to improve their statistics and with the correct combination, produce powerful effects such as the ability to attack in multiple directions or resistance to multiple status effects. Chocobo and his partner can also temporarily assume the forms of some of the creatures from the game through the use of morph tonic or traps, gaining unique abilities such as flying over traps or turning enemies into toads.

After watching the credits when the game ends, the player is offered a new mode where they can revisit any dungeon using one of Chocobo's partners. This additional playthrough also contains a secret dungeon that has 30 levels.

== Story ==
=== Characters ===
Chocobo's Dungeon 2 includes many characters, each of which has their own way to help Chocobo throughout the game, such as how Mrs. Bomb allows Chocobo to stay in her home.

Some characters, including Mog, Shiroma, and Cid, will join Chocobo and a second player can control them or they can be controlled by the AI. Chocobo can collect feathers to summon other characters including Titan, Sylph, Ramuh and Bahamut.

=== Setting ===
Chocobo's Dungeon 2 takes place mostly in a village, which is located near a beach and a vast sea. The ivy-covered Cid's Tower looms over the village. A huge forest, as well as a swamp and Snow Mountain, are north of the village. The overworld will change occasionally as the player progresses through the game.

=== Plot ===
As the game begins, Mog goes treasure hunting with Chocobo in a dungeon filled with monsters, where Mog flicks a switch and becomes separated from Chocobo. Chocobo encounters the white mage Shiroma who leaves, claiming there is important work for her to do in the dungeon. Chocobo enters the dungeon once again and has another encounter with Shiroma.

Shiroma chooses to aid Chocobo in finding Mog, but when they find him, Mog causes the dungeon to sink into the sea due to his greed, which destroys Shiroma's home. They go to a nearby village to find Shiroma's "Aunt Bomb", who allows Mog and Chocobo to stay with her. Shiroma is soon kidnapped and Chocobo must save her, with the assistance from local inventor Cid after Chocobo helps clear out that took over his tower.

== Development and release ==
Squaresoft announced Chocobo's Dungeon 2 in July 1998, alongside plans to release the game that December. Chocobo's Mysterious Dungeon, the game's predecessor, had been released the previous year. Chocobo's Dungeon 2 became the first Mystery Dungeon title released outside Japan. IGN was surprised that the word "mysterious" was removed from the title, and wondered why the game was being released in America as the previous title had moderate sales in Japan, and the original had never been released at all outside Japan. They also noted that it seemed to generate the least amount of "fanfare" or press attention of Square's announcements at the 1999 Tokyo Game Show.

Longtime Chocobo character designer Toshiyuki Itahana made designs and models for the protagonist of Chocobo's Dungeon 2. The music was composed by Kenji Ito, and was well reviewed by RPGFan, saying the music was lighthearted, enjoyable, and no tracks were "skippable".

The game was released in Japan on December 23, 1998, and was supposed to be released in North America on January 12, 2000, before the date was pushed earlier to December 17, 1999. On release, the game came packed with demos of game such as Parasite Eve or Bushido Blade 2. A version of the game was planned for the WonderSwan Color, but was never released.

== Reception ==
Reception

Aggregate score
Aggregator	Score
GameRankings	68%

Review scores
Publication	Score
AllGame	3.5 of 5
Electronic Gaming Monthly	6 of 10 (Note: Four critics of Electronic Gaming Monthly gave the game each a score of 7/10, 6/10, 7.5/10, and 3.5/10.)
EP Daily	6.5 of 10
Famitsu	33 of 40
Game Informer	6.75 of 10
GameFan	(G.N.) 73% 65% (Note: In GameFan's viewpoint of the game, three critics gave it each a score of 58, 67, and 71.)
GameRevolution	C−
GameSpot	6.1 of 10
IGN	6.5 of 10
Next Generation	3 of 5
Official U.S. PlayStation Magazine	2.5 of 5
RPGFan	85%

The game received average reviews. Chris Charla of NextGen was generally positive to the game, despite noting that the game does not bring anything new to the genre. In Japan, Famitsu gave it a score of 33 out of 40.

David Zdyrko of IGN called the game "boring", and said that "it lacks just about every feature that is important in a masterful role-playing experience". Andrew Vestal of GameSpot praised the Japanese import's graphical design, calling it endearing, and praising said import's replayability. George Ngo of GameFan called the game "slow-paced, drab and gloomy", saying the gameplay is repetitive and boring, and describing the dungeons as mono-colored. E. Coli of GamePro said that Chocobo's Dungeon 2 is primarily aimed at a younger audience due to its cuteness in the game, also saying that the seasoned players would not find anything new in it. (Note: GamePro gave the game 4.5/5 for graphics, 2.5/5 for sound, 4/5 for control, and 3/5 for fun factor.)

Famitsu rated the game as the 53rd best PlayStation game in November 2000.

=== Legacy ===
Square Enix designers considered basing Chocobo's Mystery Dungeon Every Buddy!, a 2019 remaster of the Wii game Final Fantasy Fables: Chocobo's Dungeon, around Chocobo's Dungeon 2, as it was cited as one of the more popular Chocobo Dungeon games in the series. The enemy creature Skull Hammer was incorporated into that port.
