= Chocobo's Mysterious Dungeon =

1997 role-playing video game

- PlayStation box art
- Developer: Square
- Publisher: Square
- Producer: Koichi Nakamura
- Composer: Masashi Hamauzu
- Series: Final Fantasy; Chocobo; Mystery Dungeon
- Platforms: PlayStation, WonderSwan
- Release: PlayStation: JP: December 23, 1997; WonderSwan: JP: March 4, 1999
- Genre: Roguelike
- Mode: Single-player

Chocobo's Mysterious Dungeon (Note: Japanese: チョコボの不思議なダンジョン, Hepburn: Chokobo no Fushigi na Danjon) is a roguelike dungeon crawler video game developed and published by Square. A spin-off of the Final Fantasy series of role-playing video games, it was also the first entry in what would become the Chocobo series. It saw a Japan-only release on December 23, 1997, for PlayStation, and a version was released on March 4, 1999, for WonderSwan. The game was re-released in 2010 on PlayStation Network in Japan as a PSOne Classic.

The game's protagonist is a yellow chocobo, a fictional species of bird in the Final Fantasy universe, named Poulet (プーレ, Pūre). The player must fight through procedurally generated dungeons, picking up items and battling enemies.

== Gameplay ==
Chocobo's Mysterious Dungeon combines real-time combat with an Active Time Battle (ATB) system reminiscent of a Final Fantasy game. Attacks have reduced power and accuracy if made before the ATB gauge fills up. The game consists of three dungeons: a 30-level dungeon, a 60-level dungeon, and an infinite dungeon which recycles enemy types every 100 levels.

== Development ==
The game was produced by Koichi Nakamura, the founder of Chunsoft. It also marks the solo composing debut of Masashi Hamauzu, who prepared both the soundtrack and an arrangement album named Coi Vanni Gialli.

The game appeared in a booth at Tokyo Game Show 1997, but did not appear in playable form, only having a complete video presentation of the game on the company's video wall along with Front Mission 2 and Front Mission Alternative. Upon its release, it was bundled with the "Mysterious Data Disc", a bonus containing a number of movies from unreleased games and a playable demo of Xenogears.

== Reception ==
In pre-release coverage of the game, IGN stated that the decision to not show a playable version of the game was "somewhat bizarre", but that the title was "shaping up quite nicely", saying that while the game was not as flashy as Final Fantasy VII, and lacked any polygonal graphics, it was "obvious" that much effort went into designing the game's artwork. They also said that, while there was no word of a US release, they hoped the game would receive one due to the success of Final Fantasy VII.

In a post-release review, "The Elf" of Superjuegos magazine stated that, while the game's setting was "not very attractive", the gameplay was highly addictive and engaging, with "beautiful" magic, funny characters, and attractive cutscenes. He also called the game's music memorable, citing its remixes of classic themes from Final Fantasy. However, ECM of GameFan had a more negative take, characterizing Xenogears as "infinitely better", while Stephen Frost of PSM also stated that the game felt "rushed and [not] very fun", appending an image of a dead chocobo with the caption "Ugh. What was Square thinking?"

In early 1998, it was still the 10th best-selling game in Japan according to Famitsu.

== Legacy ==
Chocobo's Mysterious Dungeon was the first in the Mystery Dungeon series to surpass one million units sold due to its connection to Final Fantasy and chocobo protagonist. It was followed by a 1998 sequel, Chocobo's Dungeon 2. The characters of the game went on to star in the Chocobo series, containing numerous different genres.
