= Final Fantasy Fables: Chocobo's Dungeon =

2007 video game

- North American box art featuring Chocobo and Raffaello
- Developer: h.a.n.d.
- Publisher: Square Enix
- Director: Yuji Yano
- Producer: Yuki Yokoyama
- Artist: Toshiyuki Itahana
- Composer: Yuzo Takahashi
- Series: Chocobo; Mystery Dungeon
- Platforms: Wii; Nintendo DS; Nintendo Switch; PlayStation 4
- Release: Wii: JP: December 13, 2007; NA: July 8, 2008; AU: July 30, 2008; EU: November 7, 2008; DS: JP: October 30, 2008; Switch, PS4: WW: March 20, 2019
- Genre: Role-playing
- Modes: Single-player, multiplayer

Final Fantasy Fables: Chocobo's Dungeon is a 2007 role-playing video game published by Square Enix for the Wii. It is an installment in the Chocobo series that focuses on Chocobo and his quest to free a town lost in time from eternal forgetfulness. It is a loose sequel to Chocobo's Dungeon 2 on the PlayStation.

The game was generally well received by critics, who praised the dialogue, graphics and nostalgia for Final Fantasy, but noted the game's shallow and repetitive gameplay. An enhanced port of the game was released for the Nintendo DS in Japan in 2008. A remaster, Chocobo's Mystery Dungeon Every Buddy!, was released for the Nintendo Switch and PlayStation 4 in 2019.

== Gameplay ==
The gameplay involves randomly generated dungeons and turn-based battles of the Chocobo's Mystery Dungeon title, though new elements have also been incorporated into the gameplay, such as the Job system featuring ten jobs. Different jobs change the appearance of the player's Chocobo and alter the layout of the dungeons the players enter. "Pop-up duels" also make a comeback with the addition of enemy cards that can be brought to "Mog's House", where they can be used to play minigames such as "bat shooter", "kick darts", fishing, and gardening.

The player uses the Wii Remote to control characters. The player can also choose to use the Classic Controller if preferred. As the player moves, Chocobo regains health, and if the player loses all of his or her health, he or she will be brought back to the beginning of the current dungeon. The game is Wi-Fi compatible, and players can battle against other players.

== Plot ==
While searching for the fabled Timeless Power gem to power his Airship, Cid and his partner Chocobo ended up being sucked into a vortex and landed in the quaint town of Lostime within the island of Memoria, which disappeared from the rest of the world fifty years ago. In the center of Lostime is a clock tower which rings the Bell of Oblivion that makes everyone lose their memories. Along with his new friend Shirma and a mysterious boy named Raffaello who is able to create a labyrinth of memories, Chocobo has to recover the lost memories of Lostime's residents. These actions reveal the mystery behind Raffaello and the calamity that began the trouble.

== Music ==
The Chocobo no Fushigina Dungeon Toki Wasure no Meikyū Original Soundtrack was released in Japan on January 23, 2008. The theme song, Door Crawl, which is both included on the soundtrack and available as a separate single, is written and performed by Ai Kawashima.

== Development ==
Development began in November 2006 with new members added to the Chocobo development team as the platform had shifted from the Nintendo DS to the Wii. Pastel colors replaced the bright colors of the Chocobo Tales. Some of the more difficult game elements were removed so that it would appeal to "small children and female" players. Square Enix's Virtual World had in-game advertisements for this game during the virtual world's first week. Joe Down Studio developed the music for the game and featured extensive remixing of music from various Final Fantasy games due to the positive reception of remixed Final Fantasy music in the game Chocobo Tales. New music was composed for the opening by Kumi Tanioka. The studio requested that they be allowed to use music from the early Final Fantasy titles as it would be appropriate to the theme of forgotten time. Musical cues such as the sound of pickaxes can be heard in the Fire Dungeon, and songs play backwards to indicate the restoration of memory. The theme of forgetting difficulties is discussed in the game story, and the developers tried to convey that putting all into resolving problems is much better than simply trying to forget, as the people in the game story have.

=== Nintendo DS port ===
An enhanced port, titled Cid to Chocobo no Fushigi na Dungeon: Toki Wasure no Meikyū DS+ (シドとチョコボの不思議なダンジョン 時忘れの迷宮 DS+, Sido to Chokobo no Fushigi na Danjon Toki Wasure no Meikyū DS Purasu; lit. Cid and Chocobo's Mystery Dungeon: The Labyrinth of Forgotten Time DS+), was released in Japan for the Nintendo DS on October 30, 2008. It features a new storyline centering on Cid, as well as new jobs for characters to learn.

=== Nintendo Switch and PlayStation 4 remaster ===
A remastered port titled Chocobo's Mystery Dungeon EVERY BUDDY! was developed by Rocket Studio and released for the Nintendo Switch and PlayStation 4 on March 20, 2019. It has a new buddy system to bring monsters and other characters into the dungeon to assist.

== Reception ==
Reception

Aggregate score
Aggregator	Score
Metacritic	WII: 76/100; NS: 73/100; PS4: 69/100

Review scores
Publication	Score
Electronic Gaming Monthly	B+ / A+
Game Informer	5.5/10
GameSpot	7/10
IGN	8.4/10
Nintendo Power	7.5/10

The game experienced strong sales in the first week after release in Japan but quickly fell from the video game charts. Square Enix reported that 160 thousand copies were sold as of September 2008, with 90 thousand units sold in Japan and 70 thousand units sold in North America. The enhanced DS version sold over 74,000 copies by the end of 2009.

IGN praised the game for its polish, graphics, humorous dialogue and its wealth of gameplay choices. Video game website Joystiq previewed the game, complaining that despite some graphical improvements, the gameplay was little different to earlier entries in the series and was, in fact, "scarily reminiscent" of the ancient game Rogue, which inspired the genre. The game was the runner-up for the best Wii game of July 2008 on IGN. It was awarded Best RPG for the Wii by IGN in its 2008 video game awards.
