= Torneko's Great Adventure 3 =

2002 video game

- Developers: Chunsoft; Matrix Software
- Publisher: Enix
- Directors: Fukashi Omorita; Yasuhiro Ohori
- Producer: Seiichiro Nagahata
- Designers: Seiichiro Nagahata; Hideyuki Shinozaki
- Programmer: Masayasu Yamamoto
- Artist: Akira Toriyama
- Writers: Sachiko Sugimura; Fuminori Ishikawa
- Composer: Koichi Sugiyama
- Series: Mystery Dungeon
- Platforms: PlayStation 2; Game Boy Advance
- Release: PlayStation 2: JP: October 31, 2002; Game Boy Advance: JP: June 24, 2004
- Genres: Role-playing, roguelike
- Mode: Single-player

Dragon Quest Characters: Torneko's Great Adventure 3 – Mystery Dungeon is a 2002 role-playing video game developed by Chunsoft and Matrix Software and published by Enix for the PlayStation 2. It is part of the Dragon Quest and Mystery Dungeon series and contains randomly generated dungeons and uses turn-based action combat. The game was also made for the Game Boy Advance in 2004 as Torneko's Great Adventure 3 Advance.

== Gameplay ==
The main character of the game is Torneko, originally localized as Taloon in North America, a merchant and playable character from Dragon Quest IV. Torneko can explore fully 3D dungeons and have members join his party. The player moves through randomly generated dungeons and uses turn-based action combat. The player can bring along creatures and henchmen to fight with them as they battle monsters in the dungeons. In the Game Boy Advance version, an addition mode is available in which the player can fight through four advanced dungeons independently of the game's story.

The game is the first in the series to feature 3D graphics, and includes multiple towns, villages, castles, and dungeons. Some of the locations are not randomly generated. The game includes over 170 types of monsters, and a larger number of items and spells to use in combat than previous Torneko games.

== Story ==
The plot for Torneko's Great Adventure 3 happens seven years after the events of Torneko's Great Adventure and six and a half year after Torneko: The Last Hope. In the game, Torneko and his wife Tessie and son Tipper journey to a distant island for a vacation for celebrating Tipper's twelfth anniversary. During that time, an unexpected trouble occurred and the Torneko family arrived at a strange island. While there, mysterious forces attack and Torneko must journey into dungeons to fight them off.

== Release ==
Torneko's Great Adventure 3 would be released exclusively in Japan by Enix on PlayStation 2, on October 31, 2002. Its Game Boy Advance port, Torneko's Great Adventure 3 Advance, would also be released exclusively in Japan by Square Enix on June 24, 2004.

== Reception ==
Reception

Review score
Publication	Score	
Publication	GBA	PS2
Famitsu	32/40	35/40

The PlayStation 2 version of the game has sold over 513,000 copies as of November 2008. The Game Boy Advance version of the game has sold nearly 117,000 copies as of 2007. The PlayStation 2 version was given a high 35 out of 40 by Famitsu magazine. The Game Boy Advance version was given a lower 32 out of 40.
