= Avalon Code =

2008 video game

- European cover art
- Developer: Matrix Software
- Publishers: JP: Marvelous Entertainment; NA: Marvelous Entertainment USA; PAL: Rising Star Games
- Directors: Keizo Kato; Takahiro Matsumoto
- Producer: Yoshifumi Hashimoto
- Designer: HACCAN
- Composer: Minako Adachi
- Platform: Nintendo DS
- Release: JP: November 1, 2008; NA: March 10, 2009; AU: 2009; EU: March 12, 2010
- Genre: Action role-playing

Avalon Code (アヴァロンコード, Avaron Kōdo) is a fantasy action role-playing game for Nintendo DS. It was developed by Matrix Software and published by Marvelous Entertainment.

The game makes use of a mechanic that allows the player to affect the "elemental code" of the world around them by using the Book of Prophecy which is situated on the touch-sensitive lower screen. This book is the central focus of both the plot and gameplay. The game also allows the player to select between a male or female protagonist.

Avalon Code received mixed reviews, being praised for its graphics and innovative mechanics, but criticized for its linear story-line and repetitive gameplay.

== Gameplay ==
The plot, as well as the gameplay, revolves around the Book of Prophecy situated on the touch-sensitive lower screen of the Nintendo DS. In order to record a person, monster, plant, or weapon in its pages, the player performs a "Code Scan", which is done by striking the target to be recorded with the Book itself (mapped to the B button at all times). Locations are filed under the Book's Map section and are added automatically when the player enters the screen for the first time.

Each page reveals its subject's essential information such as attack strength for weapons; health points for enemies; local lore for maps; and personal tastes and goals for people. In addition, every object or character capable of being scanned has a Code. This page Code is in turn composed of many Codes, which are exactly what they sound like: pieces of seven different shapes that fit into the Mental Map like pentominoes into a box and radically alter the target's properties.

Creating different combinations of Codes by adding and removing them to attain specific quantities or ratios changes the object's title and, often, effects. Changing titles to remove 'defective' Codes as well as creating 'new' items (usually by following certain obtainable recipes) is a facet of gameplay used in many side-quests and occasionally within the story. An example of Code manipulation is as follows: at one point near the beginning of the adventure, Yumil/Tia's only weapon is a Rusted Battle Sword, where 'Rusted' is a title derived from the presence of three Codes of Illness and three Codes of Copper on the Mental Map. Rempo urges the player to remove the Illness, converting the title to 'Copper' and strengthening the weapon's overall attack power. The player can then add the Illness to a monster's Code, which will lower the health points of every encountered enemy of that species as long as the piece of Illness is contained in their Mental Map. By the same right, transferring Codes of Poison from a sinister character's page to a weapon would give the player the ability to poison stricken enemies.

Each page in the Book of Prophecy has a numerical value of 'worthiness' measured in Code Points, and when the Book's entire value reaches certain quantities, it will level up. In this way the Mental Map undergoes two size upgrades, beginning with a 3x3 square. Specific side-quests and mini-game activities are triggered through 'News Flashes' upon level-ups as well. In order to raise page values, the player can, for example, manipulate Codes, examine 'Exploration Points' on a map, present another cast member with things he or she enjoys collecting, defeat a high number of a certain enemy, call on a Spirit for aid, or equip a weapon.

=== Dungeons ===
Dungeons are fairly linear and consist of many linked rooms in which the player must complete a specific task to advance (and determine that page's value). There are several varieties of goals, ranging from lighting torches to flipping switches to defeating enemies. Although there is an onscreen several-minute countdown for each challenge room, the player may still complete the challenge and advance after running out of time with no penalty other than a lower score. Most dungeons, naturally, end with a fight against a boss. Performance is ranked according to a medal system; a good run is rewarded with a gold medal for the room, while an especially poor or slow run may not garner a medal at all. Rooms and bosses may be replayed as many times as the player desires in order to achieve a better score or find hidden bonuses.

After defeating each monster boss in the Boss section of the Book of Prophecy, the player unlocks a new page in a special Book chapter. These pages contain questions about the coming world and the Codes that are inserted as answers serve to determine the aspects of it. Such aspects include the inhabitants' housing and the background music. Answers can be filled in differently as many times as the player wishes, yielding different results with different code combinations.

=== Romance ===
Players familiar with other games by Marvelous Entertainment producer Yoshifumi Hashimoto will likely compare the affection system featured in Avalon Code to that of games such as Story of Seasons titles and the fantasy-tinged Role Playing Game spin-off series Rune Factory, even though the protagonists of Avalon Code are too young for marriage. Most human non-player characters can be given gifts, and, as previously mentioned, have different tastes and aspirations.

Avalon Code features a total of fourteen 'eligible' non-player characters who may take a romantic interest in the player character as various side-quests are completed. In the course of the campaign, Yumil may date characters labelled as Heroines in the Book of Prophecy (kind but terminally ill orphan Fana, determined heiress Princess Dorothea, guarded psychic Nanaida, precocious elf Sylphy), while Tia may date one of the Heroes (wary street kid Rex, vigilant aspiring hero Duran, emotionless swordsman Anwar, devoted commander General Heath). Six additional characters become available as love interests after the completion of the main quest: two Book Spirits apiece, along with a Hero and Heroine not listed in the game's instruction booklet.

Most character-related side-quests may be undertaken by either Yumil or Tia even if the character in question is of the same gender as the player or the player already has an 'established' significant other. Developing platonic relationships adds new back-story information to entries in the Book of Prophecy. Every Hero and Heroine also has a particularly gripping personal issue that manifests itself in the form of a locked Code piece. For example, the sword master Gustav's son, Duran, was unable to stop a tragedy that happened before his eyes. A square in his Mental Map is taken up by 1 Weakness that is removable only by helping him come to a better understanding of the past.

== Plot ==
The plot centers on a young peasant who has been plagued with apocalyptic and prophetic nightmares for weeks prior to the beginning of the story. The latest dream, shown in the opening cinematic, features a mysterious voice. The voice reveals that the protagonist's world has undergone countless reincarnations in the past and is fated to a cycle of correction, destruction, and rebirth until "true enlightenment" is achieved and that the main character has been chosen by the Powers-That-Be to deem the people, places, and things of the current world worthy (or "unworthy") of being carried over into the next.

This voice is that of a magical sentient record book called the Book of Prophecy. Taking this tome, the newly appointed Chosen One sets out to find and befriend four guiding elemental Book Spirits who take residence in the Book. Throughout the journey, the Chosen One learns more about a hidden plot to hasten the imminent apocalypse playing out beneath a shallow political feud with the neighbouring kingdom and the decisions of the previous Chosen One.

== Development ==
In May 2008, Famitsu featured Avalon Code in their Nintendo DS spotlight. The game gained attention early on for its high quality 3D engine. Marvelous Entertainment USA and XSEED Games showcased the game as part of their game portfolio at that year's Electronic Entertainment Expo, with plans to release the U.S. version of the game in the first fiscal quarter of 2009. Less than a month before its release in Japan, the game was showcased at the Tokyo Game Show at Marvelous Entertainment Japan's booth.

Originally, the game's Book of Prophecy was intended to be a virtual book that could be written in using the touch pad on the Nintendo DS. In an interview with Siliconera, producer and scenario writer Yoshifumi Hashimoto said "in the beginning of the planning stages I thought about the players actually writing "become weaker" into the book, but realized that this will take too long from the time the user thinks about it to the time it'll actually change. Plus I wanted players from other countries to all play the game the same way, so I decided to go with moving codes (icons) around".

Avalon Code's character designs were done by the Japanese illustrator HACCAN, while much of the scenery and promotional art is accredited to the Japanese artist group Kusanagi. The opening theme, "Deep Forest", was sung by Japanese pop musician Kana Yazumi.

== Reception ==
Reception

Aggregate score
Aggregator	Score
Metacritic	71/100

Review scores
Publication	Score
Famitsu	30/40
Game Informer	7/10
GamePro	3.5/5
GameRevolution	C−
GameSpot	5.5/10
GameZone	8/10
IGN	8.3/10
Nintendo Power	8.5/10
Nintendo World Report	6/10
Official Nintendo Magazine	77%

Avalon Code received "average" reviews according to the review aggregation website Metacritic. 1UP.com called it "the kind of game that's bursting with creativity and ambition, but constantly trips over its own good intentions". IGN called the game's core component, the Book of Prophecy, "a compelling mechanic you won't find anywhere else". Nintendo Life praised the game for its "stunning" visuals, but criticized the Book of Prophecy for being "ridiculously annoying [to browse] through to find the data you need". GameSpot referred to the Book as "the game's most unique and fascinating feature", but said that overall "Avalon Code is a thoroughly mundane adventure despite some interesting, but poorly implemented, concepts". In Japan, Famitsu gave it a score of one seven, one eight, one seven, and one eight for a total of 30 out of 40.
