= Alundra 2 =

1999 video game

Alundra 2: A New Legend Begins
- Developer: Matrix Software (Note: Produced by Contrail. Additional work by Sony Computer Entertainment Japan.)
- Publishers: JP: Sony Computer Entertainment; WW: Activision
- Directors: Yasuhiro Ohori; Masumi Takimoto
- Producers: Mika Hayashi (executive); Tad Horie (associate)
- Designers: Takahiro Kaneko; Yasuhiro Ohori
- Programmer: Yasuhiro Matsumoto (character)
- Writer: Hiroshi Miyaoka
- Composer: Kōhei Tanaka
- Platform: PlayStation
- Release: JP: November 18, 1999; NA: March 21, 2000; EU: June 20, 2000; AU: 2000
- Genre: Action role-playing
- Mode: Single-player

Alundra 2: A New Legend Begins (Note: Japanese: アランドラ2 魔進化の謎, Hepburn: Arandora 2 Ma Shinka no Nazo; lit. "Alundra 2: The Mystery of Magical Evolution") is an action role-playing game developed by Matrix Software and published by Sony Computer Entertainment for the PlayStation. It was released in Japan in 1999 and internationally by Activision in 2000. It was produced by Contrail.

Unlike its predecessor, Alundra, Alundra 2 features a 3D look which opens up a new world of puzzles. Alundra 2 is a standalone sequel, and has no ties with the original. It has a whole new story with a different set of characters, including the main character, Flint. Compared to the darker storyline of Alundra, Alundra 2 has a more light-hearted storyline.

== Gameplay ==
Alundra 2 is an action role-playing game that has 3D environments. The character can be moved in all directions, and the camera can be manually rotated 360 degrees. Gameplay consists of fighting enemies, interacting with character NPCs, puzzle solving, platforming, and exploration. The story is presented through text and voiced cutscenes.

The player controls Flint, a young swordsman and silent protagonist. Flint uses a sword to fight enemies and carries a shield which gives passive damage reduction; stronger versions of both are obtainable. Flint can also learn additional successive strikes for his sword, known as combos, by collecting items called Puzzle Pieces and exchanging them with the character Lord Jeehan. Magical ring items grant Flint special powers, such as the abilities to float in place or traverse over harmful lava.

== Story ==
Alundra 2's story is set in the kingdom of Varuna. Mephisto, a powerful sorcerer is using magical wind-up keys to control humans and turn animals into mindless, violent machines. Flint is a pirate hunter wanted for treason, and he is after the pirates that caused his parents' death.

The game begins with Flint infiltrating a flying airship. Inside, he finds the ship is staffed by humanoid robots; there are conspicuous keys protruding from their backs and their speech is unintelligible. Also on board is a family of three pirates: Zeppo, Albert, and Ruby. Flint eavesdrops on their conversation and it is mentioned that Mephisto can create "mechanical men" through a technology that only he understands. Baron Diaz, untrusting of Mephisto, tasks the pirates with keeping an eye on him.

Flint is discovered and attacked by Zeppo. The resulting battle damages the interior of the ship and causes it to crash. Flint falls into the sea and washes onto a shore where he is found by a villager and taken in. After recovering, he meets Princess Alexia and joins forces with her. Alexia explains that her father is missing and she knows that Baron Diaz used the pirates to get rid of him.

In their search for incriminating proof, Flint and Alexia encounter Mephisto, battle with his mechanical abominations, and investigate the suspicious "Church of the Key". They are eventually detained by Mephisto and taken by sea to Varuna. Flint is thrown overboard, but he survives and reaches the capital to confront Baron Diaz. The Baron threatens Alexia's life and tasks Flint with retrieving three relics in exchange for her safety. Flint is told to enlist the help of the three pirates he had met before: Zeppo, Albert, and Ruby. They assist him in entering the ruins. Flint goes through the ruins and does battle with their ancient guardians to obtain the three relics.

Flint returns to Baron Diaz and delivers the relics, and the Baron uses them to enter a tower in search of the lost treasure of Varuna. Mephisto follows the Baron inside and reads a mural on a wall. He explains that there are a set of instructions on the mural and that yet another relic is required before the instructions can be completed. Flint is ordered to retrieve a fourth relic and he battles through more dungeons in search of the relic. Along the way, he meets an enslaved dragon named Tirion. Flint frees him and the dragon flies him back to Varuna.

After Flint returns the final relic, it is set in place and the machinery of the tower is activated. Mephisto reveals that there isn't a lost treasure of Varuna and that he had built the tower two thousand years ago in order to calculate the coordinates of the nerve-center of the planet. A wizard named Lumiere, however, prevented Mephisto from entering by sealing the tower. Mephisto then inserts a key into the Baron, turning him into a mechanical monster. After Flint defeats the monster, Baron Diaz returns to normal. Outside of the capital, Mephisto raises his Star Key, a giant key-shaped structure, out of the sea. His intention is to use its power to mutate the planet and take control.

Tirion flies Flint, Alexia, Zeppo, Albert, and Ruby to the Star Key to confront Mephisto. Flint makes his way through the dungeon and he finds that Zeppo has been captured. Mephisto appears and inserts a key into Zeppo, also turning him into a mechanical monster. Flint defeats the monster, returning Zeppo to his former state, and then faces Mephisto in battle. Flint kills Mephisto and the Star Key collapses into the sea. The group escapes on the back of Tirion; Flint and Alexia share an embrace as they fly away.

== Reception ==
Reception

Aggregate score
Aggregator	Score
GameRankings	69%

Review scores
Publication	Score
CNET Gamecenter	5/10
Electronic Gaming Monthly	6/10 (Note: Two critics of Electronic Gaming Monthly gave the game each a score of 6.5/10, one gave it 5/10, and the other gave it 6/10.)
EP Daily	7/10
Eurogamer	6/10
Famitsu	28/40
Game Informer	6.5/10
GameFan	79% (Note: In GameFan's viewpoint of the game, three critics gave it each a score of 83, 73, and 80.) (G.N.) 73%
GameRevolution	C
GameSpot	4/10
IGN	7.7/10
Next Generation	4/5
Official U.S. PlayStation Magazine	3/5
RPGamer	(2008) 5/10 (2011) 1.5/5
RPGFan	68%

The game received average reviews according to the review aggregation website GameRankings. Japanese magazine Famitsu gave the game a score of 28 out of 40.

Dave Zdyrko of IGN praised the game's predecessor Alundra as "one of the PlayStation's best action/RPGs" and its storyline as "one of the darkest storylines of any role-playing games in existence", but also said that Alundra 2 "just doesn't stack up" and that, "even though the writing was exceptional, it didn't make up for the fact that the game had a really fruity storyline." In contrast, he enjoyed "the game's puzzles and was very impressed with the localization job by Activision", but that "the game was really hurt by its less than precise controls, annoyingly difficult boss battles", "uninspiring music, and graphical glitches". He concluded: "Pretend that this has nothing to do with the original Alundra or Zelda, and you'll probably enjoy this game just fine. It's definitely one of the top five action/RPGs on the PlayStation." Jeff Lundrigan of NextGen called it "A pretty standard RPG story gussied up with well-designed action puzzles, terrific graphics, and a huge world. Very nice."

E. Coli of GamePro gave two reviews of the game, one calling it "a thrilling ride that belongs in every action/RPG fan's collection", and another later saying that the game stands on its own with awesome gameplay, a huge and engaging cast of characters, and hours of brain-frying puzzle solving fun." (Note: In both reviews of the game, GamePro gave the game three 4.5/5 scores for graphics, sound and control, and 5/5 for fun factor.) However, Joe Ottoson of AllGame gave it three-and-a-half stars out of five, saying, "if you're feeling a little dashing, a little daring, and possibly courageous and caring, look to Alundra 2 for some stories to share with your faithful and friendly. But if you're a devout fan of Alundra however, you may want to tread lightly as Alundra 2 shares little in common."

In Japan, the game sold 5,771 copies during the week of November 15 to November 21 in 1999.
