= Torneko's Great Adventure =

1993 video game

- Developer: Chunsoft
- Publisher: Chunsoft
- Director: Tadashi Fukuzawa
- Producer: Koichi Nakamura
- Designers: Tadashi Fukuzawa; Kazuya Asano; Seiichiro Nagahata
- Programmer: Takenori Yamamori
- Artist: Akira Toriyama
- Writer: Kazuya Asano
- Composer: Koichi Sugiyama
- Series: Mystery Dungeon; Dragon Quest
- Platforms: Super Famicom; Dragon Quest Heroes: Torneko's Mystery Dungeon -Classic HD-; Nintendo Switch; Nintendo Switch 2; PlayStation 5; Windows; Xbox Series X/S
- Release: Original: JP: September 19, 1993; Dragon Quest Heroes: Torneko's Mystery Dungeon -Classic HD-: WW: September 9, 2026
- Genres: Role-playing, roguelike
- Mode: Single-player

Torneko's Great Adventure: Mystery Dungeon is a 1993 role-playing video game by Chunsoft. The first entry in the Mystery Dungeon series, the game features Torneko, a merchant from Dragon Quest IV, and his adventures around the Mystery Dungeon in search of items. 33 years after its Japanese only release, the game received a worldwide release on modern platforms under a remake titled Dragon Quest Heroes: Torneko's Mystery Dungeon -Classic HD-.

Torneko's Great Adventure is the first spin-off game in the Dragon Quest franchise. The game was a success with over 800,000 copies sold, which led to Chunsoft turning it into a franchise with the release of a sequel, Mystery Dungeon 2: Shiren the Wanderer, in 1995. The unreleased English version of the game was to be called Mystery Dungeon: Taloon's Great Adventure.

== Gameplay ==
During the higher levels of the game, monsters tend to chase the player in multiple numbers.

The gameplay is similar to roguelike-style PC games. The main similarity is the heavy use of randomized dungeons and effects. The main character of the game is Torneko, originally localized as Taloon in North America, a merchant and playable character from Dragon Quest IV. The player continues his story from Dragon Quest IV, where he wishes to make his store famous and ventures into mystery dungeons to retrieve items to stock in his store.

While Torneko explores the dungeons, he collects items and fights monsters, similar to ones found in Dragon Quest games. If he leaves the dungeon, he can sell off the items he found. He can also equip certain items. By saving up money, he can improve his home and shop.

== Story ==
Torneko, a weapon merchant for hire, lives in Lakanaba with his wife, Tessie, and son, Tipper. He has one dream: to own his own shop and make it the greatest one. As such, he sets out on a journey, searching for an iron safe and works on other various jobs, and finally opens a store thanks to the help of his wife. Soon after, Torneko hears a rumor that there is an amazing treasure in a mysterious dungeon that no one has ever seen. However, he is worried about the store and his family. Tessie understands him and decides to go alongside him to the "Mystery Dungeon". The family travel across oceans and mountains for years before finally arriving near the dungeon. He sets up store near a single large tree in a new village near it.

Torneko tries to get permission from the King of the land to explore the dungeon, but he refuses to budge, saying it is too dangerous. However, he does not back down, and the King promises to give him permission only if he can retrieve the jewel box from the "Small Mystery Dungeon". Torneko brings back the King's jewelry box and gets permission to explore the "Mystery Dungeon". After successfully obtaining the permission, he ventures into the dungeon, gradually expanding his store with the income he earns from selling the items he brings back from his repeated adventures. Finally, he succeeds in bringing back the "Box of Happiness"; a rumored treasure hidden in the dungeon's innermost depths. When he opens the box, a small melody begins to play, which reveals it functions as a music box. The box, placed in Torneko's house, then plays beautiful music, which makes everyone near the store, including his family happy. Thus, Torneko's goal of obtaining the treasure in the "Mystery Dungeon" was realized. While the story concludes here, he continues to explore a new "More Mysterious Dungeon".

While it is unknown how many years went by between the events of Dragon Quest IV and this game, the story continues in Torneko: The Last Hope (1999) and Torneko's Great Adventure 3 (2002).

== Development ==
Torneko's Great Adventure was developed by Chunsoft, the developers for the first five Dragon Quest games. It was the first game in the Mystery Dungeon series of roguelike games, of which over thirty have been produced, including five Dragon Quest spin-offs. Letting players explore a familiar setting was part of lowering the difficulty and trying to broaden the appeal of the genre.

After the launch of the Super Famicom in 1990, and finishing development for Dragon Quest V in 1992, Chunsoft ceased working on the Dragon Quest series and began working on other genres, now known as the Sound Novel and Mystery Dungeon series. The latter series was initially based on the 1980s game Rogue, which has spawned its own genre called roguelike. By the time the company released their first Sound Novel game in 1992, Otogirisō, both Koichi Nakamura, founder of Chunsoft and co-creator of the Dragon Quest series, and Seiichiro Nagahata, one of the executive officer of Spike Chunsoft and corporate planning officer back then, wanted to work on a different genre.

For a week, Nakamura played Rogue at the recommendation of Nagahata, who had played the game frequently during university, trying to understand the game's appeal, and concluded the high degree of challenge made the game rewarding. Unlike today's game software development, as soon as someone expressed their idea on a project, the team from the company, which was small back then, started brainstorming without going through the approval process or budget, which resulted in an unclear work division. When Nakamura and Nagahata explained the system introduced in Rogue, which was used as a template, there was considerable resistance from employees at the beginning; as he talked about it, other staff members gradually left the discussion, disagreeing with his idea, or making excuses they were busy with other projects. However, they accepted this idea soon after.

For the game's general setting, the team decided to use characters from a recognizable franchise in Japan. Nakamura directly wanted to put the Dragon Quest series in the project, while Nagahata thought of using The Legend of Zelda. The latter never occurred due to the company being too small back then. After going with the former series, Nakamura then asked Yuji Horii, scenarist and creator of the Dragon Quest series, for permission to use the Dragon Quest games as the template, on which he was given permission soon after. Horii participated in the development as an advisor, such as not having unidentified items early in the game.

One major change from the normal Dragon Quest game was the replacement of the hero, who normally had a grand mission to save the world, with the kind of person who would go hunting for treasures in dungeons, but also due to the comical effect of failing in a dungeon in many ways. For this reason, Nakamura chose Torneko, the well-loved shopkeeper from Dragon Quest IV, imagining that he was exploring for items to put in his shop. The "permadeath" feature, seen in most roguelike games where the game starts over if the player character dies, was adjusted so the player does not start from scratch and has a chance to return to the last dungeon he fainted at. Yuji Horii and Akira Toriyama also contributed in creating different angles of characters and monsters, with the help of drawings made by Nakamura, as their official artworks were always shown in a frontal view.

Much new content was added to the game that differs from Rogue with the goal of making it accessible to anyone. A hunger system was added in the game so the player has to pay attention to the adventure through the dungeon, as once it is empty, Torneko's HP decreases for each turn. Furthermore, an earthquake was also added in dungeons as acting against players who would stall and farm in one floor, by forcefully dropping Torneko to the next floor once the player reaches the maximum amount of turns. Then, a translucent map was added when exploring a dungeon, with dots representing the player, items, traps, and monsters in a floor. Finally, music and sound effects were introduced in this game, which was not common in the roguelike genre at the time. Most of the tweaks given in this roguelike game were later reused for future Mystery Dungeon games, with further adjustments for each of them. As for the game's balancing, Nagahata was the one in charge after an employee got confused with organizing data. He used Microsoft Excel's spreadsheets to organize data for items, monsters, and other content that relays on the genre.

The game was published in 1993 and became the first video game to bear the "Mystery Dungeon" moniker. Nakamura conceived the series as Chunsoft's first original work. After its release in Japan, there were mentions of the game being developed for an overseas release, although it never happened. A PAL prototype originating from Germany was unearthed, proving that it was far in development. Its owner got it while working at Nintendo of Europe in Germany. A game counselor mentioned he has played the same prototype in the past, and was later awarded a Happy Music Box by Chunsoft, claiming he was "one of the first Americans to reach the bottom of the dungeon". The same prototype was later put on sale on eBay in 2022, before being sold privately in 2024.

== Music ==
As with other games in the Dragon Quest series, the musical score for the game was written by Koichi Sugiyama. Sony Records released the soundtrack, titled Suite Torneko's Great Adventure: Musical Chemistry, on October 21, 1993, in Japan. It contains eight arranged tracks performed by a chamber orchestra, as well as three tracks containing original game music. The album was reprinted on October 7, 2009. Two pieces of music from the game were performed by the Tokyo City Philharmonic Orchestra at the Game Music Concert 3, the year of the game's release.

== Release ==
The game was promoted with an exceptionally high-budget television commercial. It had a running time of 30 seconds, unusually long for Japanese commercials of the time, and consisted almost entirely of claymation footage filmed to run at twenty-four frames per second. Torneko's Great Adventure was released on September 19, 1993, exclusively in Japan, with a catchphrase that will be re-used throughout the series; "The RPG that can be played 1,000 times".

=== Dragon Quest Heroes: Torneko's Mystery Dungeon -Classic HD- ===
On September 9, 2026, after 33 years of being available only on Super Famicom and exclusively in Japan, and missed a potential English release confirmed by the prototype, a remaster of the game was announced during a Nintendo Direct, then released on the same day as its announcement.

The remaster features some new elements never introduced in the Mystery Dungeon franchise such as a difficulty slider, but also returning features such as a detailed description of monsters and a livestream mode; although only available as a DLC, which were originally from Shiren the Wanderer: The Mystery Dungeon of Serpentcoil Island. Other features include a 2.5D gameplay similar to Torneko: The Last Hope, with enhanced visuals and lightning effects, an official English translation, orchestrated music sourced from Suite Torneko's Great Adventure: Musical Chemistry for some cases, and new cutscenes based on a paper animation instead of a clay animation, like the original game's advertisement or Torneko: The Last Hope. They were made by Naoki Ikushima, who has also worked on Dragon Quest III HD-2D Remake and Dragon Quest I&II HD-2D Remake.

== Reception ==
Reception

Aggregate scores
Aggregator	Score
Metacritic	70/100 (NS2)
OpenCritic	68% (Classic HD)

Review scores
Publication	Score
Famitsu	9/10, 7/10, 8/10, 8/10
Dengeki Super Famicom	7/10, 7/10, 7/10, 9/10
PlayStation Magazine	22.7/30

Torneko's Great Adventure received generally favorable reviews by critics in Japan. However, its remaster received mixed reviews according to review aggregator website Metacritic. Most of its critics come from a sluggish gameplay in its release.

In Famitsu magazine, three of the four reviewers complimented the addictive nature of the game, with one reviewer saying "it's been a while since I've been so absorbed in a game." The reviewers commented that they found the game easy to get involved with as it had similar gameplay elements of the popular Dragon Quest game series. One reviewer wrote that if it was not so related to Dragon Quest, they might not have been as interested. Another reviewer said that an audience expecting regular RPG-styled combat would be disappointed. One reviewer described it as a "rip-off" Rogue (1980) with "zero originality" but that it was also as fun as the original game.

Two of the reviewers in Famitsu declared Torneko's Great Adventure the best release of the week in their September 24, 1993 issue.

On November 12, 1993, Famitsu magazine's Reader Cross Review gave the game an 8 out of 10 and it earned the Gold Hall of Fame. It won the Grand Prize at the 1993 Japan Software Awards. In 2006, the game was voted number 78 by the readers of Famitsu magazine in its top 100 games of all time. Although it has sold less than the Dragon Quest's mainline titles, the success behind its sales is due to its crossover with the latter, which is a cultural phenomenon in Japan. Eventually, the game reached over 800,000 copies sold in its lifetime.

The game spawned the Mystery Dungeon series and two sequels starring Torneko, Torneko: The Last Hope in 1999 and Torneko's Great Adventure 3 in 2002.
