= Matrix Software =

Japanese video game developer

Matrix Corporation
- Native name: 株式会社マトリックス
- Romanized name: Kabushiki gaisha Matorikkusu
- Type: Private
- Industry: Video games
- Founded: July 1994
- Headquarters: Tokyo, Japan
- Key people: Kosuke Ohori (president)
- Products: See complete products listing
- Number of employees: 119 (2026/01)
- Website: matrixsoft.co.jp

Matrix Corporation (株式会社マトリックス, Kabushiki gaisha Matorikkusu), commonly referred to as Matrix Software, is a Japanese video game developer located in Tokyo. Founded in July 1994 by former members of Climax Entertainment and Telenet Japan, the company has since created games for a number of systems beginning with their action-adventure game title Alundra in April 1997. Matrix has teamed with other developers such as Square Enix and Chunsoft to produce games for existing franchises such as Final Fantasy and Dragon Quest, as well as other anime and manga properties. In addition to game console development, Matrix Software has also made games for various Japanese mobile phone brands since 2001.

== Company history ==
Matrix Software was founded in July 1994 by Kosuke Ohori and three friends who had each been involved in the video games industry for many years beforehand. Kosuke, a veteran of the game development industry since high school, joined with former members of Climax Entertainment and Telenet Japan to create a company that he felt would "bring people serious game content". Nearly three years after their establishment, the company released their first game, Alundra for the PlayStation game console in April 1997, which would prove popular enough to receive a sequel two years later. In September 1999, Matrix obtained their first business partner in Chunsoft, with whom they collaborated to create a spin-off to their popular Dragon Quest series, Torneko: The Last Hope. Since then, the company would join with other companies to create games for other entertainment franchises such as Yoshihiro Togashi's YuYu Hakusho, Eiichiro Oda's One Piece, and Square Enix's Final Fantasy. In later years, Matrix would focus on mobile games, developing casual games as well as ports of games in the Professor Layton series.

== Games developed ==
Year	Title	Publisher(s)	Platform(s)
1997	Alundra	Sony Computer Entertainment	PlayStation
1998	Nectaris: Military Madness	Hudson Soft	PlayStation
1999	Tamago de Puzzle	Sony Computer Entertainment	PlayStation
1999	Torneko: The Last Hope	Enix	PlayStation
1999	Alundra 2: A New Legend Begins	Sony Computer Entertainment	PlayStation
2002	Dual Hearts	Sony Computer Entertainment	PlayStation 2
2002	Dragon Quest Characters: Torneko no Daibōken 3	Enix	PlayStation 2
2002	Toukon Inoki Michi: Puzzle de Daa!	Pacific Century Cyber Works	PlayStation 2
2004	Dragon Quest V	Square Enix	PlayStation 2
2004	The Nightmare of Druaga: Fushigi no Dungeon	Arika	PlayStation 2
2005	Onmyou Taisenki: Byakko Enbu	Bandai	PlayStation 2
2005	YūYū Hakusho Forever	Banpresto	PlayStation 2
2005	Onmyou Taisenki: Hasha no In	Bandai	
2005	Futari wa Precure Max Heart: Danzen! DS	Bandai	Nintendo DS
2006	Final Fantasy III	Square Enix	Nintendo DS, iOS, Android, PlayStation Portable
2006	Cluster Edge	Marvelous Entertainment	PlayStation 2
2006	Crayon Shin-Chan: Saikyou Kazoku Kasukabe King	Banpresto	Wii
2007	Lost in Blue 2	Konami	Nintendo DS
2007	One Piece Gear Spirit	Bandai Namco Games	Nintendo DS
2007	Lost in Blue 3	Konami	Nintendo DS
2007	Final Fantasy IV	Square Enix	Nintendo DS, iOS, Android
2008	Final Fantasy IV: The After Years	Square Enix	Mobile, Wii, iOS, Android
2008	Maji de Manabu: LEC de Ukaru - DS Hishou Boki 3-Kyuu	Square Enix	Nintendo DS
2008	Avalon Code	Marvelous Entertainment	Nintendo DS
2008	Nostalgia	Tecmo	Nintendo DS
2009	Tales of VS.	Bandai Namco Games	PlayStation Portable
2009	Final Fantasy: The 4 Heroes of Light	Square Enix	Nintendo DS
2009	Dragon Quest III	Square Enix	Mobile, iOS, Android
2010	Final Fantasy II	Square Enix	iOS, Android
2010	Final Fantasy Dimensions	Square Enix	Mobile, Android, iOS
2010	Dragon Quest Monsters: Wanted!	Square Enix	Mobile, Android, iOS
2011	White Knight Chronicles: Origins	Sony Computer Entertainment	PlayStation Portable
2011	Treasure Report: Kikai Jikake no Isan	Bandai Namco Games	Nintendo DS
2011	Groove Coaster	Taito	iOS
2012	Layton Brothers: Mystery Room	Level-5	iOS, Android
2013	Final Fantasy V	Square Enix	iOS, Android, Microsoft Windows
2013	Dragon Quest	Square Enix	iOS, Android
2013	Dragon Quest Portal App	Square Enix	iOS, Android
2014	Final Fantasy VI	Square Enix	iOS, Android, Microsoft Windows
2014	Dragon Quest II	Square Enix	iOS, Android
2015	Hachamecha! Gremlins Wars	Warner Bros. Interactive Entertainment	iOS
2015	Groove Coaster 2	Taito	iOS, Android
2015	Final Fantasy Dimensions II	Square Enix	iOS, Android
2015	Omega Labyrinth	D3 Publisher	PlayStation Vita
2016	Groove Coaster 3: Link Fever	Taito	Arcade
2017	Groove Coaster 3EX: Dream Party	Taito	Arcade
2017	Omega Labyrinth Z	D3 Publisher	PlayStation 4, PlayStation Vita
2018	Groove Coaster 4: Starlight Road	Taito	Arcade
2018	Professor Layton and the Curious Village HD	Level-5	iOS, Android
2018	Billion Road	Bandai Namco Entertainment	Nintendo Switch, Windows
2018	Professor Layton and the Diabolical Box HD	Level-5	iOS, Android
2019	Omega Labyrinth Life	D3 Publisher	PlayStation 4, Nintendo Switch, Microsoft Windows
2019	DJ Nobunaga	Square Enix	iOS, Android
2019	Balloonio	mspo	iOS, Android
2019	Cube Runnings	mspo	iOS, Android
2019	Crowd Rescue	mspo	iOS, Android
2020	Pie Throw	mspo	iOS, Android
2020	Brigandine: The Legend of Runersia	Happinet	iOS, Android
2020	Professor Layton and the Unwound Future HD	Level-5	iOS, Android
2020	Samurai Slash	Ketchapp	iOS, Android
2021	Yu-Gi-Oh! Rush Duel Saikyo Battle Royale	Konami	Nintendo Switch
2021	Rogue Vill	GungHo Online Entertainment	iOS, Android

== See also ==
- Climax Entertainment
- Telenet Japan
