= Omega Labyrinth =

2015 video game

- Japanese cover art, featuring (left to right) Mirei, Nako, Marika, Saeri, and Aina
- Developer: Matrix Software
- Publishers: JP: D3 Publisher; KR/TW: H2 Interactive
- Platforms: PlayStation 4 PlayStation Vita
- Release: JP: November 19, 2015; KR/TW: June 21, 2017
- Genres: Roguelike, dungeon crawler
- Mode: Single-player

Omega Labyrinth (オメガラビリンス), stylized as ω Labyrinth, is a 2015 roguelike dungeon crawler role-playing video game developed by Matrix Software and published by D3 Publisher for the PlayStation Vita. The game follows a group of girls as they explore a dungeon in search of the fabled "Holy Grail of Beauty", which is said to be able to grant any wish. Protagonist Aina Akemiya searches for the Grail in order to increase her chest size, as she feels uncomfortable about her small breasts. Omega Labyrinth has been noted for its heavy fanservice content and was released on November 19, 2015, in Japan.

== Gameplay ==
Omega Labyrinth is a roguelike dungeon crawler role-playing game. The dungeon is randomly generated; each time Aina and her accomplices enters the dungeon, its map, monsters, and available items change. As players move within the dungeon, the monsters also move in a turn-based fashion. Players accumulate experience by defeating monsters and characters become stronger as they level up. If they leave the dungeon, the characters are reduced back to level 1, and all items are lost when the health bar reaches zero. Thus, missions must be completed all in one go. The goal of the game is to search for and obtain the "Holy Grail of Beauty", whilst defeating monsters and avoiding traps through utilizing items, armor, and weapons.

When entering a dungeon, players can either choose another computer-controlled character to act as their partner and enter with them, or go in alone. Although partnering up has tactical advantages in battle, it is also more risky, as the partner's items are also lost when the team gets defeated. Through defeating monsters in the dungeon, players accumulate Omega Power in addition to experience points; this increases Aina's chest size. This is accompanied by an increase in stats and if Aina reaches maximum Omega Power she enters "Hatsumune Mode", greatly powering up her status. When leaving the dungeon, Aina's chest returns to its normal size, though accumulated Omega Power can be used to purchase items.

Items obtained in dungeons are initially unidentified, with their name and effects not known. They need to be revealed using Omega Power, with an animated sequence where the player places said item between a characters breasts and shaking achieving this. Any character can be selected for this sequence, allowing players to choose their favorite. Players who do not wish to go through the scene may choose to skip it entirely. Players can also choose to strengthen their characters through the "Faint in Agony Awakening" (悶絶☆覚醒) system, which is triggered by special dungeon items; this leads to one of the girl characters going into an "excited" state. Touching her during this time allows Omega Power and status increases, and are unique to each character.

In dungeons, players can also find panties and bras, which can be equipped to increase the defense of the characters, along with weapons and shields. Combinations of these can also trigger special effects. Various categories of weapons are obtained through dungeon exploration, this includes swords, lances, axes, sickles, and katanas. Items can be synthesized in dungeons using Omega Power to strengthen them. As players progress through the dungeon, characters may sometimes be captured by monsters and tapping the screen is required to free them; this provides opportunity for fanservice, as well as screenshots of characters upon falling into a dungeon trap.

Omega Power can be spent and various items purchased at the in-game shop. The game features downloadable content which can also be picked up at the shop.

== Story ==
=== Characters ===
- Aina Akemiya (朱宮 愛那) (voiced by Haruka Yamazaki), the lively and energetic protagonist of the game. She is obsessed with the size of her small breasts, and thus enters the dungeon in search of the "Holy Grail of Beauty" to grant her wish of enlarging them. Although not an honor student, she is popular enough to be oftentimes the center of attention.
- Nako Mito (美桃 なこ) (voiced by Aya Uchida), a skillful cook and Aina's best friend, and was invited by her to challenge the dungeon together. She has a voluptous chest when compared to Aina.
- Saeri Soja (蒼社 紗衣里) (voiced by Mao Ichimichi), a quarter-Russian girl who adores Aina. "Nimble like a ninja", Saeri is a low-key girl who was also invited by Aina to challenge the dungeon with her.
- Pai (パイ) (voiced by Emi Uema), a fairy girl who "loves breasts". Pai was saved by Aina from a monster attack and thus grew attached to her. She was the one who told the protagonists the story of the dungeon and Holy Grail. Her name is a shortened version of Japanese slang word oppai.
- Marika Hikawa (翠川 真理華) (voiced by Yu Kobayashi), the student council vice president at Anberyl Girls Academy. Blessed with talent, she handles mostly everything flawlessly without effort. After experiencing her first loss to student council president Mirei, she is overcome with admiration for her.
- Mirei Shirogane (白金 美玲) (voiced by Fumiko Uchimura), the student council president of Anberyl Girls Academy. Unlike Marika, she has little talent but has built her way up through hard work and discipline. She wishes to be nice to everyone.
- Rinne Kuon (久遠 輪廻) (voiced by Akira Nakagawa), the founder of Anberyl Girls Academy. A "woman of many mysteries", she is feared by students due to her strict rules but also well respected for her dignified behavior.
- Yumi Amano (天乃 夢美) (voiced by Kikuko Inoue), a former student who now takes care of the shop and general affairs at the academy. She is extremely popular among the students and is a big sister-like figure.
- Rio Akanezaki (voiced by Ayaka Fukuhara), a new character introduced in Omega Labyrinth Z and Aina's rival. She hates rules and considers teachers a troublesome existence. It was her dream to use the Holy Grail to make her breasts smaller, but because Aina destroyed it before she got the chance, she has developed a grudge towards her.

=== Plot ===
The game is set in the Anberyl Girls Academy, where a rumor of a "Holy Grail of Beauty (美の聖杯)", an object that is said to be able to grant any wish, has surfaced. The grail is said to be hidden in an ancient cave that is only open on the school's founding day. Thus, at the beginning of the game, several girls have come in search of the mysterious grail, with protagonist Aina Akemiya setting out to find the grail in order to increase her chest size, which is smaller than the other girls'.

Beginning the game's storyline, Aina and Nako head into a nearby dungeon in order to find the grail but are immediately separated. However, luckily Aina then meets the fairy girl, Pai. Pai explains that inside the dungeon, Aina will encounter monsters, and each one she kills will release Omega Power, a powerful source of energy which strengthens her stats and also enlarges her bust. However, upon leaving the dungeon, the Omega Power is dispelled and her chest returns to their normal size.

== Promotion and development ==
The game was first announced in August 2015 through a teaser website, with additional information being later released in a Dengeki PlayStation issue. A debut trailer was subsequently released, and a second trailer was afterwards released in late October. Characters were teased in a series of silhouettes on Dengeki Online. Initial copies of the game include the "Lightning Malance" weapon and "Butt Shield" armor; unlike the other in-game equipment, these can be repurchased upon losing them in a dungeon.

== Reception ==
Four Famitsu reviewers scored Omega Labyrinth 7, 7, 7 and 8 out of 10, for a total score of 29/40. The game sold 25,000 copies during its first week on sale in Japan.

Richard Eisenbeis of Kotaku summed up the game as "an odd mix of breast-filled fanservice and unforgiving dungeon crawling". He wrote that players who enjoy fanservice or challenging gameplay may like Omega Labyrinth, but the death system (where missions must be completed in one go) and limited item capacity were criticized as too difficult and too frustrating, respectively. The game was compared to the Senran Kagura series by Sato of Siliconera.

== Sequels ==
A sequel, Omega Labyrinth Z, was released on July 6, 2017 in Japan for the Vita and PlayStation 4. The girls from the original return, alongside new characters. In Omega Labyrinth Z, the protagonists explore a mysterious new cave at Anberyl Girls Academy, which is opened only on the anniversary of the school's founding. Omega Labyrinth Z was originally going to be released in North America and Europe during early 2018 through publisher PQube Games. In February, the title was refused classification in Australia and in March, the Video Standards Council also refused classification in the United Kingdom. PQube cancelled the planned Western version of the game in June after being blocked for release by Sony America and Sony Europe.

A third game, Omega Labyrinth Life, was released worldwide on August 1, 2019 for Nintendo Switch and PlayStation 4, and for Steam on December 10. The PlayStation 4 version, which was renamed Labyrinth Life, is censored; some sexual content is removed or replaced, and some nude scenes have obscuring steam added.
