= Alundra =

1997 action-adventure video game

- European cover art featuring the titular character Alundra
- Developer: Matrix Software (Note: Additional work by Sony Computer Entertainment Japan.)
- Publishers: JP: Sony Computer Entertainment; NA: Working Designs; EU: Psygnosis
- Director: Yasuhiro Ohori
- Producers: Takahiro Kaneko; Hideaki Kikukawa; Akira Sato
- Designer: Yasunaga Oyama
- Writer: Ichiro Tezuka
- Composer: Kōhei Tanaka
- Platform: PlayStation
- Release: JP: 11 April 1997; NA: 8 January 1998; UK: March 1998; EU: 5 June 1998
- Genre: Action-adventure
- Mode: Single-player

Alundra, released in Europe as The Adventures of Alundra, is an action-adventure video game developed by Matrix Software and published by Sony Computer Entertainment for the PlayStation. It was originally released in 1997 in Japan, January 1998 in North America by Working Designs and June 1998 in PAL territories by Sony-owned Psygnosis. A standalone sequel, Alundra 2, was released in 1999.

The game's protagonist is a young man named Alundra, who learns that he has the power to enter people's dreams. He is shipwrecked on an island, near the village of Inoa, where locals have been suffering from recurring nightmares that sometimes cause death. With his dream walking ability, Alundra proceeds to try to help the locals. The narrative becomes gradually darker and more twisted as the game progresses, dealing with mature themes such as death, clinical depression, fate, religion, and the essence of human existence.

The gameplay involves extensive exploration of the island and various dungeons, with an emphasis on challenging puzzle solving, real-time action combat, and platforming, as well as interaction with non-player characters in the village of Inoa. The main gameplay innovation is a dream walking mechanic, where Alundra can enter people's dreams, with each of the dream levels having its own unique twist based upon the dreamer's personality and traits.

Upon release, Alundra earned critical acclaim as well as some initial commercial success. It was praised for its well-written story and characterization, smooth game mechanics and platforming, challenging gameplay and puzzles, and expansive overworld exploration.

== Gameplay ==
The gameplay style is top-down action-adventure, with a heavy emphasis on puzzle solving. A range of terrain and surfaces affect the player character, from sand, which causes the player character to move more slowly, to lava, which damages the player character. Upgrades throughout the game can help the player overcome many of these obstacles, encouraging exploration.

== Plot ==
Alundra, the silent protagonist and player character, is an elf from the clan of Elna, the Dreamwalkers. He set out for a place called Inoa because of a recurring dream in which a mysterious figure who calls Alundra "Releaser" tells him that he must save the villagers from the evil of Melzas. The ship carrying Alundra is caught in a storm and is broken in half, leaving most of the crew dead and Alundra drifting unconscious.

Alundra is next seen washed ashore to an unknown beach, where a man named Jess finds and rescues him. Jess carries Alundra to his house at the village of Inoa and lets him sleep in his guest room. In the village, Alundra discovers he is a Dreamwalker, which means he has an ability to enter other peoples' dreams, and helps the villagers get rid of the nightmares that have been possessing them. Since Alundra's arrival, bad things begin to happen in the village, with various villagers being murdered in their dreams, which leaves them dead outside of their dreams as well. Some of the villagers eventually start blaming Alundra for what is happening.

Another dreamwalker, Meia, from the clan Elna arrives to the city and helps Alundra fight off the nightmares of the villagers. Later in the game, it is revealed that the demon, Melzas, has disguised himself as a god, and he is the source of all the nightmares of the village. His goal is to make the villagers pray for their god, and thus make Melzas himself gain power from their prayers. Ronan, the priest of the village, was also on the side of Melzas and helped him to deceive the villagers, and keep them praying for Melzas, the false god. Once Alundra discovers the truth, he gathers the information and items needed to access Melzas' palace to defeat the demon. After Melzas is destroyed, Alundra and Meia bid farewell to the villagers and depart together, before going their separate ways.

== Development ==
Alundra is considered a spiritual sequel to Climax Entertainment's Landstalker on the Sega Genesis, particularly because several members of the game's programming and design team had worked on Landstalker. Alundra producer Yasuhiro Ohori previously worked on Landstalker, while map designer Kenji Orimo previously worked on the Shining Force series.

The game began development before the PlayStation launched in 1994 and took three years to complete. It originally began development as an action role-playing game. According to Ohori, the team decided there would be "no experience points" but instead "the player accumulates experience" themselves so that by "the end of the game, even someone who sucked at the outset will find they’ve gotten way better at the action."

Alundra's game world contains over 7,000 screens. The music for Alundra was composed by Kohei Tanaka.

== Release ==
The game was published by Sony in Japan, Working Designs in North America, and Psygnosis in Europe.

Later, Alundra was released as a downloadable game on the PSone Classics service for the PlayStation 3.

== Reception ==
Reception

Aggregate scores
Aggregator	Score
GameRankings	84%
Metacritic	86/100

Review scores
Publication	Score
Computer and Video Games	3/5
Electronic Gaming Monthly	8.625/10
Famitsu	31/40
Game Informer	8.5/10
GameSpot	8.8/10
IGN	8.5/10
Next Generation	4/5
Dengeki PlayStation	75/100, 90/100, 85/100, 75/100
Ultra Game Players	9/10

Awards
Publication	Award
Electronic Gaming Monthly	Role-Playing Game of the Year (runner-up), Game of the Month
GamePro	Best Role-Playing Game (2nd Place)
Metacritic	#6 Best Critic Reviewed PS1 Game of 1997

The game had sold 143,114 copies in Japan by the end of 1997. Following its North American release, Working Designs sold over 100,000 copies of the game in North America within a single month in early 1998.

Alundra was well received by critics upon release. It has a score of 86 out of 100 at Metacritic based on 9 reviews, making it the sixth highest-rated PlayStation title of 1997, and held an 84% at GameRankings based on 13 reviews at the time of the site's closure in 2019. Critics hailed the game for its deep and often maddening challenge, particularly the puzzles. They said that, while the gameplay is derivative of The Legend of Zelda series and Landstalker, it has enough original elements to stand on its own. Next Generation stated that "Working Designs made a smart decision importing Alundra, and any gamer looking for a unique challenge is guaranteed to appreciate it." Jay Boor wrote in IGN, "Never have I been so tested and challenged since the old Genesis adventure title, LandStalker. And Climax has made Alundra twice as hard, twice as challenging, and twice as good as its LandStalker counterpart."

The music was applauded for its strong composition and appropriateness for the tone of the game. GamePro commented that "the game's heroic battle music will make you feel good about being the fighting savior of tormented sleepy souls." Reviewers for Electronic Gaming Monthly (EGM) and GameSpot also praised the translation as being noticeably more restrained than Working Designs' earlier projects, in which the humor was often overdone to the point where it compromised the mood. GameSpot's Chris Johnston said that "For those who have bagged on WD for its past liberties with American humor, there is little to complain about here. Alundra is maturely written and has a tone and feel that fits the game to a T."

The one significantly criticized element of the game was the graphics. Both Next Generation and GamePro remarked that Alundra looks too much like a "16-bit" game, with GamePro giving it a 4.5 out of 5 for sound, control, and fun factor but a 3.5 out of 5 for graphics. GameSpot found that it is sometimes difficult to judge height and depth, forcing the player to proceed by trial and error. EGM's Sushi-X said the color palette is too dominated by "bland greens and tans", though he and the other three members of the review team were overall very impressed with the game's challenging dungeons and puzzles, giving it their "Game on the Month" award.

Electronic Gaming Monthly and GamePro both selected Alundra as the runner-up for their 1997 Best Role-Playing Game of the Year awards, coming second only to Final Fantasy VII. During the inaugural Interactive Achievement Awards, the Academy of Interactive Arts & Sciences nominated Alundra for "Console Game of the Year" and "Console Role-Playing Game of the Year".

In 2009, Destructoid's Conrad Zimmerman described Alundra as a "fresh and innovative" game and "one of the finest examples of action/RPG gaming." He particularly praised it for featuring "a plot the likes of which I had never seen before in the genre," the strong "writing and characterizations," and the "clever and challenging puzzles."

== Sequel ==
The game was followed up by Alundra 2 in 1999. The sequel uses 3D graphics and has little in common with the original game.
