= Torneko =

Dragon Quest protagonist

- Dragon Quest character
- Torneko in the Nintendo DS version of Dragon Quest IV
- First game: Dragon Quest IV (1990)
- Designed by: Akira Toriyama
- Voiced by: Japanese: Chafurin (Dragon Quest series); Tesshō Genda (Dragon Quest IV CD Theater); English: Francis Magee

Torneko (Japanese: トルネコ, Hepburn: Toruneko) (called Taloon in the original English release) is a fictional character in the 1990 video game Dragon Quest IV, one of its heroes. He also appears as the star of multiple games in the Mystery Dungeon series, being used for the first entry to make the series more appealing by using a recognizable brand. He is among the most recurring characters in the Dragon Quest series.

== Appearances ==
Torneko is one of the nine main characters in Dragon Quest IV, being the starring character in the third chapter of the game. He is a merchant who lacks combat abilities, and instead works as a merchant, providing for his wife Tessie and son Tipper. He works as an apprentice at his local weapon seller, one day feeling unfulfilled, and deciding to head out and open his own shop. As part of this aspiration, he seeks out an item called Steel Strongbox that allows him to keep all of his money if he falls instead of losing half. After finding this box, he assists various people, including helping a man get out of prison and go back home, repairing a bridge between the towns of Ballymoral and Endor, and passing letters between the prince of Ballymoral and princess of Endor.

While in Endor, he finds someone trying to sell his shop, but needs permission from the king of Endor first. He discovers that Ballymoral intends to conquer Endor, leading him to deliver a message to the king of Ballymoral, declaring the desire to have their children marry, thus averting war. This leads to the king permitting Torneko to buy the store, opening his own business and bringing his family to live there. He later helps fund an old man's construction of a tunnel between Endor and the country of Casabranca, accepting the task of carrying the man's dream of traveling the world and finding treasures, commissioning a boat to accomplish this, commissioning the construction of a ship. In the fifth chapter, the protagonist meets him, helping him replace a dark light in the Pharos Beacon with a holy light and defeating the monsters that subjugated the location, joining them in their party. He helps the protagonist defeat the antagonist, Psaro.

Torneko appears in other entries, being among the most recurring characters in the Dragon Quest series. He also has his own spin-off series in the Mystery Dungeon series. The first title is Torneko's Great Adventure, which was followed by Torneko: The Last Hope and Torneko's Great Adventure 3. Despite not starring in the Mystery Dungeon game Dragon Quest: Young Yangus and the Mystery Dungeon, he appears in it.

== Concept and creation ==
Torneko was created for Dragon Quest IV, designed by series character designer Akira Toriyama. In the English localization of the NES version, he was called Taloon, and was called Torneko Taloon in the English version of Dragon Quest IV on the Nintendo DS. He speaks with an Irish brogue in the English DS version. In the CD drama adaptation of Dragon Quest IV, Torneko is played by Tesshō Genda. In the live performance Dragon Quest Live Spectacle Tour, he is portrayed by comedian Imoaraizaka Kakaricho. When applying for the role, he told that the role required someone who was fat and who could act, dance, and laugh.

When designing the Mystery Dungeon game Torneko's Great Adventure, the team thought of ways they could make the concept easier to understand, leading them to deliberate over which Dragon Quest character would help best for that. They ultimately made Torneko the protagonist under the mindset that players would be able to understand the goal of collecting weapons and treasures if they chose him. They then asked series creator Yuji Horii for permission, who granted it. In their next game, Mystery Dungeon: Shiren the Wanderer, they ultimately chose not to use Torneko, as they wanted to allow the protagonist to steal, and felt that would not suit Torneko's character.

== Reception ==
Torneko has received generally positive reception, with Crank In staff identifying his humorous character as being responsible for this. Magmix writer Seiichiro Hayakawa discussed how Torneko left a strong impression on players. Author Daniel Andreyev called him "extremely popular," attributing him getting his own spin-off to his unconventional class and role in Dragon Quest IV, which he felt was "sufficiently important and memorable." He called him a "strong, sincere character" who, despite being aware of his limits, would do what he needed for his family, comparing him to Game of Thrones character Samwell Tarly. Discussing his theme, Andreyev found it a particularly memorable song in the game's soundtrack, which he felt enhanced Torneko's chapter with its "clever use of base." In a poll conducted by Futabanet, Torneko was voted the third-favorite character in Dragon Quest IV. Futabanet staff noted that he was a humorous character, becoming popular among fans.

Torneko's chapter was a particularly popular one according to one of the game's programmers Koichi Nakamura, with Yuji Horii noting that despite some people hating it, the people who liked it tended to love it. Futabanet writer Yamaguchi Quest considered Torneko's chapter his favorite of Dragon Quest IV, calling him among the most popular and well-known of the cast due in part to his Mystery Dungeon games. He felt that the story of a man working hard to provide for his wife and to open his own business was emblematic of what Dragon Quest IV represented, appreciating his kindheartedness. Destructoid writer Chad Concelmo, despite noting the "harsh criticism his chapter received from many players, he found the uniqueness of the chapter endearing. He viewed Torneko as a non-traditional character, calling him a "breath of fresh air" due to his clumsiness, weakness, and desire to take care of his family and run his own business. He also appreciated that he had a "fully realized" family and was so likable. USgamer writer Bob Mackey considered Torneko's chapter his favorite part of the game, finding the "day-to-day drudgery" of Torneko's life unique and the best part of the chapter.

Due to his relative lack of combat ability, Torneko tended to be used less in the fifth chapter of the game, with Magmix staff noting that they often left him behind in the carriage and, when made to leave a character behind as a hostage, tended to choose Torneko. The remake of Dragon Quest IV added new dialogue of Torneko saying he expected to be left behind. Magmix staff also noted his lack of combat ability typically resulted in him being lower level, and thus being used less later. Futabanet writer Jackie argued that, despite typically being sent to the carriage, he was an important character nonetheless, citing him creating a bridge between Endor and Ballymoral, allowing the two cities to have contact. They also noted his involvement in bringing peace between the two kingdoms by mediating the relationship between Endor's princess and Ballymoral's prince.
