= Nostalgia (video game) =

2008 video game

- North American cover art
- Developers: Matrix Software; Red Entertainment
- Publishers: JP: Tecmo; NA: Ignition Entertainment
- Composers: Rei Kondoh; Kaori Komuro; Shinichiro Sato
- Platform: Nintendo DS
- Release: JP: November 6, 2008; NA: October 23, 2009
- Genre: Role-playing video game
- Mode: Single-player

Nostalgia (Note: Originally released in Japan as Nostalgio no Kaze (ノスタルジオの風, Nosutarujio no Kaze; lit. "Wind of Nostalgio").) is a role-playing video game developed by Red Entertainment and Matrix Software for the Nintendo DS handheld system. Initially released in November 2008 for Japanese audiences by Tecmo, an English version of the game was released for North America by Ignition Entertainment in October 2009. The game's development was headed by producer Keisuke Kikuchi, with programming and three-dimensional graphics by Matrix Software, who had previously developed Square Enix's Nintendo DS versions of Final Fantasy III and IV.

Taking place in an alternate reality steampunk version of the 19th century, the game follows Eddie, a London boy and son of a great adventurer as he and his friends travel the world in an airship in search of his missing father. The game features turn-based combat and aerial battles between the player's customizable airship, the Maverick, and enemy airships. The player's party, consisting of Eddie, the street urchin Pad, a witch named Melody and the mysterious Fiona were shown in early trailers to be traveling to such places as New York City, Cairo, Tokyo, Northern Europe and South America.

== Gameplay ==
Nostalgia is a traditional role-playing video game featuring three-dimensional characters and environments. Players control a young London boy named Eddie and his compatriots as they travel across an alternate history 19th-century Earth on a high-powered zeppelin, visiting various locales and raiding ruins in order to uncover the truth about an ancient civilization, as well as find Eddie's lost father. In order to advance the story, players must visit towns and interact with non-player characters to obtains clues on their next destination, as well as traverse dangerous dungeons and environments in order to find hidden treasures. Taking advantage of the Nintendo DS's dual screens, gameplay is featured on one screen while a map of the player's current location is present on the other, which fills as they travel through new areas. While traveling through the game, the player will randomly encounter enemies as they move through dangerous areas, which must be defeated in battle.

Battles in Nostalgia use a turn-based combat system where both characters and enemies acting in an order relative to their "speed" statistic. A Combat Order bar is present in battles that shows which of the player's party members or enemies will act next, with the player selecting a character's command just before their turn. In any given turn, a player may choose to attack an enemy, defend, use an item for beneficial effects, or use special skills unique to each character. In addition to ground battles, a player may also encounter enemies while in their airship, leading to a ship-to-ship combat sequence with unique commands. Players must defeat all of their enemies by attacking them until their hit points are extinguished, which grants each character experience points that go towards gaining levels, thus making them stronger and giving them access to more abilities. The player's party is judged at the end of each battle with a letter grade based on their actions in combat, and is determined by how quickly and flawlessly they have defeated their enemies and may give additional rewards.

== Characters ==
There are five main playable characters in the game:

- Eddie Brown – the lone son of famous British adventurer Gilbert Brown. He is an aristocrat who lives with his parents in the countryside of London in a mansion. It is implied he may have feelings for Fiona. When his father disappears during an adventure, Edward takes it upon himself to becomes an adventurer to find him.
- Pad Remington – a young man living in London's east end and the son of adventurer Patrick Remington. Separated from his parents at a young age, he learned to survive on his own and looked after the kids of the slum. Initially, he thinks of adventuring as a waste of time until he travels with Eddie. Although he initially looked down on Eddie due to his high society status, he eventually grows to accept him as a true friend and see past his social status. It is heavily implied throughout the game that he may have feelings for Melody. He is reunited with his mother Elisabeth after 15 years of separation. He has skill with firearms.
- Melody Farklight – a young witch who grew up in her family's isolated Mervielle Village. With no friends her own age, she grew to have a selfish and egotistical personality. Throughout her adventures with her friends, she starts to grow more humble and open, eventually seeing her companions as true friends (especially Pad, for whom she is hinted to have romantic feelings). Her mother, Medea Farklight, gave her life to protect Melody from Hartmann of The Cabal. Her skills include sorcery and magic.
- Fiona – a mysterious amnesiac girl saved by adventurer Gilbert Brown from the Ancient Father's Cabal. She was known as the Princess of the White Order and of Asgard royalty, and was called the "Bearer of the White Wings" before being sealed in Pandora's box for thousands of years. The Cabal pursued her relentlessly as she was the only person capable of touching the tablets The Cabal desperately vies for, as they're the key to opening the portal to Asgard. Her mysterious powers deal in benevolent white magic and healing abilities. Note: Fiona was a guest character for a short amount of time before permanently joining the group.
- Gilbert Brown – Eddie's father and a famous British adventurer. He disappeared after saving Fiona from The Cabal, having fallen from his airship, and his whereabouts were unknown until his son found him, injured in a battle with the Ancient father's Cabal.

== Development ==
Nostalgia was first announced in a July 2008 issue of Japanese magazine Famitsu, where it was revealed that both Matrix Software and Red Entertainment would be teaming with Tecmo to bring the game to players the following November. The game was produced by Tecmo's Keisuke Kikuchi, best known for his work on the company's Fatal Frame series, whose goal was to inject traditional role-playing elements with simple gameplay, aspiring to "make a product that everyone could play.

Airship design sketches from the Japanese pre-order bonus artbook

Project director Naoki Morita of Red Entertainment envisioned the game's historical setting as an alternate 19th century Earth, which was wholly supported by Kikuchi who remarked that "I knew this game had such potential when I saw Mr. Morita's project book – It is an adventure game set in another Earth, offering an enjoyable story that involves various cultures in many diverse locations". Morita originally wanted to produce an alternate history-style role-playing game as far back as 1996, but became sidetracked due to the runaway success of his Sakura Taisen series on the Sega Saturn and shelved the project until work began on the Nintendo DS. Despite the large delay in production, Morita remained confident of his original vision, declaring that "I was confident that no matter how long it took, our designs for Nostalgia wouldn't lose their luster".

The staff of Matrix Software were largely responsible for the game's programming, and had previously worked with Square Enix to create the Nintendo DS version of Final Fantasy III and IV. The music for Nostalgia was composed by Rei Kondoh, Kaori Komuro, and Shinichiro Sato, who were credited alongside their musical unit "T's Music". Tecmo released a special promotional album featuring ten songs from the game to players who pre-ordered the title in Japan, along with an artbook that included design sketches and official artwork.

Initially to be published by North American publisher Xseed Games, in 2008 the game was later claimed by another company Ignition Entertainment, who published it in October 2009, under the title Nostalgia. Shane Bettenhausen, the company's Director of New Business Development, said that he was "deeply honored" to be given the opportunity to release the game in English, and felt the game had a place in the current western game market as a unique and original title, stating that "amid a sea of remakes and rehashes, this endearing adventure blazes its own unique path".

== Reception ==
Reception

Aggregate score
Aggregator	Score
Metacritic	72/100

Review scores
Publication	Score
1Up.com	C+
The A.V. Club	B
Famitsu	30/40
Game Informer	8/10
GameRevolution	C+
GameSpot	6/10
GameTrailers	7.4/10
IGN	7.2/10
Nintendo Life	9/10
Nintendo Power	7/10
Nintendo World Report	8/10
Pocket Gamer	4/5
RPGamer	2.5/5
RPGFan	73%

Nostalgia received "average" reviews according to video game review aggregator Metacritic. In Japan, Famitsu gave it a score of one eight, one seven, one eight, and one seven, for a total of 30 out of 40.

GameZone gave the game 8.8 out of 10, saying, "Playing Nostalgia is a joy, plain and simple, in a way that too few RPGs are anymore. It's a game that can make you feel like a fresh-faced kid, stepping out into a world of excitement and adventure for the first time – and let me tell you, it's a good feeling." Will Herring of GamePro gave it three-and-a-half stars out of five, saying that he "couldn't help but feel that he'd played this JRPG somewhere before."

The game had a modest sales start during its original release in Japan, selling 7,930 units in its first week.
