= Layton Brothers: Mystery Room =

Japanese puzzle adventure video game

- Developer: Matrix Software
- Publisher: Level-5
- Director: Tatsuya Shinkai
- Producer: Akihiro Hino
- Designer: Tatsuya Shinkai
- Composers: Yuzo Koshiro; Takeshi Yanagawa; Takeshi Arai
- Series: Professor Layton
- Platforms: iOS, Android
- Release: iOS: JP: September 21, 2012; NA: June 27, 2013; EU: June 27, 2013; Android: WW: September 5, 2013
- Genres: Adventure, Puzzles
- Mode: Single-player

Layton Brothers: Mystery Room (Note: Japanese: Reiton Burazāzu Misuterī Rūmu (レイトンブラザーズ・ミステリールーム)) is a puzzle adventure video game for iOS and Android, published by Level-5. It is a spin-off of the Professor Layton series, following rookie investigator Lucy Baker, who works with genius detective Alfendi Layton, son of Hershel Layton, in a special department of Scotland Yard's crime investigation unit known as the "Mystery Room". The game was released in Japan on September 21, 2012, and in English on June 27, 2013. An Android version was released on September 5, 2013.

After being mentioned in 2017's Layton's Mystery Journey, Lucy Baker and Alfendi Layton cameo in the final episode of the 2018–2019 anime series Layton Mystery Tanteisha: Katori no Nazotoki File.

== Story ==
The game is told from the perspective of newly minted detective constable Lucy Baker, who begins her new job at New Scotland Yard's "Mystery Room", a department of the Serious Crime Division that solves the cases no one else can. Working with Alfendi Layton, a brilliant but reportedly "unstable" investigator, Lucy discovers that he has a dissociative identity disorder over which he has no control. His alternate persona, which Lucy nicknames "Potty Prof", exhibits a largely uninhibited and sometimes vicious personality with a performative flair, professing an admiration of skilful criminals and the "beauty" of a clever murder, but holding a cold and unforgiving attitude towards the fates of perpetrators.

=== Plot ===
Arriving at Scotland Yard on her first day, detective constable Lucy Baker is advised by the Commissioner and his Deputy of her posting to a department of the Serious Crime Division nicknamed the "Mystery Room" as assistant to inspector Alfendi Layton, an apparent genius investigator. Upon their meeting, Alfendi has Lucy work alongside him to remotely solve the murder of a young woman at a seaside resort as a test. Managing to prove herself, the pair begin work together in earnest, solving a new case involving the death of a stay-at-home husband. During their inquiries, Lucy discovers that Alfendi has a "split personality", encountering his "deranged persona" for the first time in the middle of a climactic interrogation.

After investigating the public shooting of a popular stage actress at the request of Alfendi's old partner, Justin Lawson, the duo set about examining a new case, an alleged "supernatural" locked room murder of an archaeologist in South America, who was rumored to have been the target of the curse of a (now stolen) stone idol he had uncovered. They discover that the killer is actually Chico Careta, a local guide, and that he was manipulated into the crime, and used as a scapegoat, by his fiancée, Mariana Etista. Reasoning that, upon discovering that Scotland Yard were reopening the case, she sent Chico to England to take the fall, the pair are forced to defer the case's closure so long as she remains on the run. A further slaying, that of a popular DJ at a radio station, also successfully resolved, the pair receive a personal request from the Commissioner to look into the deaths of a group of mafia members. The manner of their deaths all seem to be copycat murders based on the "Jigsaw Puzzle Killings", a 26 victim serial killing from four years ago that was never made public knowledge. Alfendi and Lucy ultimately deduce that one of the mafia members killed the others alongside an unknown female accomplice, only to be betrayed by her and himself killed.

Some time later, Alfendi is alerted by Hilda Pertinax, an Interpol investigator he has history with, that Mariana Etista's whereabouts have been traced to a safe house in England, prompting the duo to make their first expedition outside of their offices. Upon uncovering Mariana's hiding place, it is revealed that her true identity is that of Diane Makepeace, the daughter of the Jigsaw Puzzle serial killer, Keelan Makepeace, who has followed in her father's footsteps and become an equally brutal murderer. She reveals herself as the one who orchestrated the mafia murders, and expresses a deep hatred for Alfendi, accusing him of "murdering" her father during a confrontation four years ago.

Diane manages to escape, and sends an invitation to Alfendi to visit Forbodium Castle, where Al and her father had their fateful showdown four years ago. Arriving in pursuit of Alfendi, Lucy and Hilda are separated, and Lucy is locked in a room by Diane, who forces her to solve a reenactment of a murder in order to escape. Upon solving it, Diane tells Lucy that this was her father's first killing; Keelan had once told her he had help inside the police, someone who destroyed vital evidence in that particular case. Lucy is shocked to discover the investigator in charge of the case was Alfendi.

As Lucy makes her way deeper into the castle, a gunshot rings out, and she and Hilda arrive on the scene to find Diane has been fatally shot, with Alfendi, who was being held captive by her, the only plausible culprit. Despite this, his "Potty Prof" personality asserts that the one who killed Diane is the same person that killed her father four years ago, proclaiming his own innocence in both slayings. He asserts that Hilda, Justin Lawson, and Commissioner Barton are all to be considered suspects, as they were the only people involved in the Forbodium Castle incident four years ago.

Upon investigation of the two incidents by the trio and a newly arrived Justin, the impossibility of a culprit other than Alfendi appears irrefutable, and, despite every new fact brought to light, Lucy is gutted when the "Placid Prof" asserts his own guilt. Despairing, Lucy is told by Hilda that "Potty Prof" is actually the Alfendi she and Lawson worked alongside, and that his gentle, "normal" personality is the so-called "fake one" that formed four years ago. In spite of this shock, Lucy resolves to keep believing in Alfendi, and conducts a final investigation, through which she unveils Justin as the mastermind behind the murders of Keelan and Diana Makepeace. He had found out about Keelan being the Jigsaw Puzzle Killer four years ago, and made him a deal, allowing him his liberty so long as he eliminated certain people at Lawson's request. He also took advantage of the Jigsaw Puzzle Killings to disguise other unrelated murders, placing jigsaw pieces at their crime scenes. Lawson killed Keelan to silence him, and killed Diane out of a fear that questions about the incident were resurfacing, especially surrounding the increasingly frequent fronting of "Potty Prof". However, even after confessing, he refuses to elaborate on his original motives, simply stating that some bad people had become too powerful.

Some time later, Alfendi visits an incarcerated Justin, who claims that the origins of Alfendi's "placid personality" are in brainwashing efforts made on Al by Lawson while he was in a coma following the Forbodium incident, in the hope of ensuring Al kept his mouth shut. Both of Alfendi's personalities and Lucy are all unconvinced that such a cheap trick could work, and vow that between the "three of them" they'll solve the "mystery of Placid Prof". In a final scene, the Commissioner is seen talking on the phone about recent events with an old friend named Hershel.

== Gameplay ==
The game is split between two distinct and alternating portions: investigation sections, and interrogations. Most of the cases follow the same routine, in which the player is given the basic facts of the case by Alfendi Layton, then must investigate the crime scene using the Mystery Room's crime scene recreation device. At the start of the case, the player is typically given a set amount of time to do a cursory sweep of the crime scene, and then must say who they think the murderer is based on their first impressions. Following this, the investigation proper commences, with further time spent examining the circumstances surrounding the crime (such as the means, motive, or certain puzzling aspects of the murder itself), finding evidence to back up points, and answering certain multiple choice questions.

Once all the points of an investigation sequence have been cleared up, the player is then able to interrogate a main suspect. During interrogations, the suspect's defense against accusations is represented by a casing around a beating heart. As the player presents the correct evidence to back up their accusations and prove the suspect's guilt, the casing slowly breaks apart. When the suspect's exposed heart turns to stone and breaks in two, the player has beaten the suspect, although on some occasions the casing reforms (entirely or partially) after breaking when the suspect attempts to offer (seemingly) contradictory information or refutes the presented evidence, only to break again if they can be proven wrong. If the suspect is innocent or the evidence insufficient, the characters return to their investigation refocused, making further study of new points of interest to clarify the incident before another confrontation.

== Development ==
The main protagonists of Layton Brothers: Mystery Room. Lucy Baker is on the left, Alfendi Layton on the right.

Layton Brothers: Mystery Room was first announced at Level-5 Vision 2009 as Mystery Room, the first entirely original title in Level-5's Atamania series. In Mystery Room, the players would team up with detectives Poccho and Sly to solve crimes sent to their "Mystery Room" by other detectives. A player could select which crime they would like to investigate from a list of crime reports. The game was originally designed for the Nintendo DS and was planned to be released in 2010. Level-5 initially announced plans to bring a demo of the game to the 2010 Tokyo Game Show, but removed it from their schedule soon before the event, throwing the game's status into question. In May 2010, the developer published an update on the game's progress and announced that the game would be delayed until Spring 2011. Finally, on October 15, 2011, the title resurfaced at Level-5 World 2011 as an iOS game titled Layton Brothers: Mystery Room. Though the game was now rebranded as a Layton series title, many of its original elements remained intact, including the titular premise and the focus on solving discrete cases using remote investigative techniques.

== Reception ==
Reception

Aggregate score
Aggregator	Score
Metacritic	75/100

Review scores
Publication	Score
Adventure Gamers	4/5
Destructoid	8.5/10
Edge	7/10
Game Informer	7/10
GamesMaster	88%
VideoGamer.com	7/10
Digital Spy	4/5

The iOS version received "generally favorable reviews" according to video game review aggregator Metacritic.
