= Groove Coaster =

Video game series

- Developer: Matrix Software
- Publisher: Taito
- Platform: iOS
- Release: July 28, 2011
- Genre: Rhythm game

Groove Coaster Zero
- Developer: Matrix Software
- Publisher: Taito
- Platform: iOS
- Release: November 20, 2012
- Genre: Rhythm game

Groove Coaster Rhythmvaders
- Developer: Matrix Software
- Publisher: Taito
- Platform: Arcade
- Release: November 5, 2013
- Genre: Rhythm game

Groove Coaster EX Rhythmvaders EX
- Developer: Matrix Software
- Publisher: Taito
- Platform: Arcade
- Release: May 26, 2014
- Genre: Rhythm game

Groove Coaster 2: Heavenly Festival Rhythmvaders 2
- Developer: Matrix Software
- Publisher: Taito
- Platform: Arcade
- Release: January 22, 2015
- Genre: Rhythm game

Groove Coaster 2: Original Style
- Developer: Matrix Software
- Publisher: Taito
- Platform: iOS / Android
- Release: July 1, 2015
- Genre: Rhythm game

Groove Coaster 3: Link Fever
- Developer: Matrix Software
- Publisher: Taito
- Platform: Arcade
- Release: March 10, 2016
- Genre: Rhythm game

Groove Coaster 3EX: Dream Party
- Developer: Matrix Software
- Publisher: Taito
- Platform: Arcade
- Release: March 16, 2017
- Genre: Rhythm game

Groove Coaster 4: Starlight Road
- Developer: Matrix Software
- Publisher: Taito
- Platform: Arcade
- Release: March 29, 2018
- Genre: Rhythm game

Groove Coaster
- Developer: Matrix Software
- Publisher: Taito
- Platform: Windows
- Release: July 16, 2018
- Genre: Rhythm game

Groove Coaster 4EX: Infinity Highway
- Developer: Matrix Software
- Publisher: Taito
- Platform: Arcade
- Release: March 28, 2019
- Genre: Rhythm game

Groove Coaster: Wai Wai Party!!!!
- Developer: Matrix Software
- Publisher: Taito
- Platform: Nintendo Switch
- Release: November 7, 2019
- Genre: Rhythm game

Groove Coaster 4MAX: Diamond Galaxy
- Developer: Matrix Software
- Publisher: Taito
- Platform: Arcade
- Release: April 9, 2020
- Genre: Rhythm game

Groove Coaster: Future Performers
- Developer: Taito
- Publisher: Taito
- Platform: Nintendo Switch
- Release: July 31, 2025
- Genre: Rhythm game

Groove Coaster (Japanese: グルーヴコースター, Hepburn: Gurūvu Kōsutā) is a series of iOS / Android and arcade rhythm game franchise developed by Matrix Software and published by Taito. The first Groove Coaster was released for iOS on July 28, 2011. The game follows a musical roller coaster-type track on screen, where players must make the appropriate controller inputs. Like many rhythm games, a life bar is attached to the gameplay. Depending on the input timing, players gain or lose points on the long percentage bar at the top-right of the screen.

== Releases ==
Groove Coaster Zero was a free-to-play updated version of the game, that got released on November 20, 2012.

The arcade version of Groove Coaster (also known as Rhythmvaders in some areas outside Japan) was released on November 5, 2013, with the touchscreen replaced by two giant controllers called "BOOSTERs" with a white button on each.

Groove Coaster EX (also known as Rhythmvaders EX in some areas outside Japan) is an update of the arcade version released on May 26, 2014.

Groove Coaster 2: Heavenly Festival (also known as Rhythmvaders 2 in some areas outside Japan) was released on January 22, 2015, in which the "LEVEL" system was removed and was replaced by a new system called the "GROOVE COIN" system, in which players can get "GROOVE COINs" according to their performance and use them as currency for virtual goods.

Groove Coaster 2: Original Style was released on iOS and Android on July 1, 2015. In this version, stage charts from the arcade version are added for some tracks, which makes two-finger play available. A new input mode is introduced, in which players play the stages by making sounds instead of touching the screen. This version was now shut down as of 31 March 2025.

Groove Coaster 3: Link Fever was released on March 10, 2016, with an online multiplayer system added, while the "MUSIC PANEL" system got removed. A fictional navigator introduced to the series, named Linka (リンカ; voiced by Moe Toyota in the Japanese version, and Jennifer Skidmore in overseas versions), who guided the player throughout the whole playthrough, was added.

Groove Coaster 3EX: Dream Party was released on March 16, 2017. In this version, the player is allowed to select the navigators. Another navigator introduced in 3EX, named Yume (ユメ; voiced by Nanami Takahashi in the Japanese version), is added as well. Also, Solo Event Mode, similar to the one until 2HF, returned in 3EXDP.

Groove Coaster 4: Starlight Road, was released on March 29, 2018, with a brand new "LEVEL" system, in which the Difficulty level range is re-arranged from 1 to 15, a new stage unlocking system, and various new functions online. Another navigator introduced in 4SR, named Seine (セイネ; voiced by Eriko Kawakami), is introduced as well.

The Steam version of Groove Coaster was released on July 16, 2018. After this version got criticized for the lagging problems, Taito abandoned all of the operating systems from the DJMAX Respect update.

Groove Coaster 4EX: Infinity Highway was released on March 28, 2019. This version added new songs and adjusted the difficulty of some existing songs.

Groove Coaster: Wai Wai Party!!!! (Note: Gurūvu Kōsutā: Wai Wai Pātī!!!! (Japanese: グルーヴコースター ワイワイパーティー!!!!)) was released on Nintendo Switch on November 7, 2019.

Groove Coaster 4MAX: Diamond Galaxy was released on April 9, 2020. This was the final version of the arcade game, which had stopped getting updates in 2022 and was given offline service on April 1, 2024.

Groove Coaster: Future Performers (Note: Gurūvu Kōsutā: Fyūcha Pāfomasu (Japanese: グルーヴコースター フューチャパーフォマス)) was released on Nintendo Switch on July 31, 2025. This game introduces new target types, includes a story mode, and has a 16:9 play interface instead of the traditional 9:16.

A Disney-themed version with slightly different gameplay, titled Disney Music Parade, was released for mobile devices on January 21, 2021 and discontinued on January 10, 2023. It was later released for the Switch as Disney Music Parade Encore on November 21, 2024.

== Gameplay ==
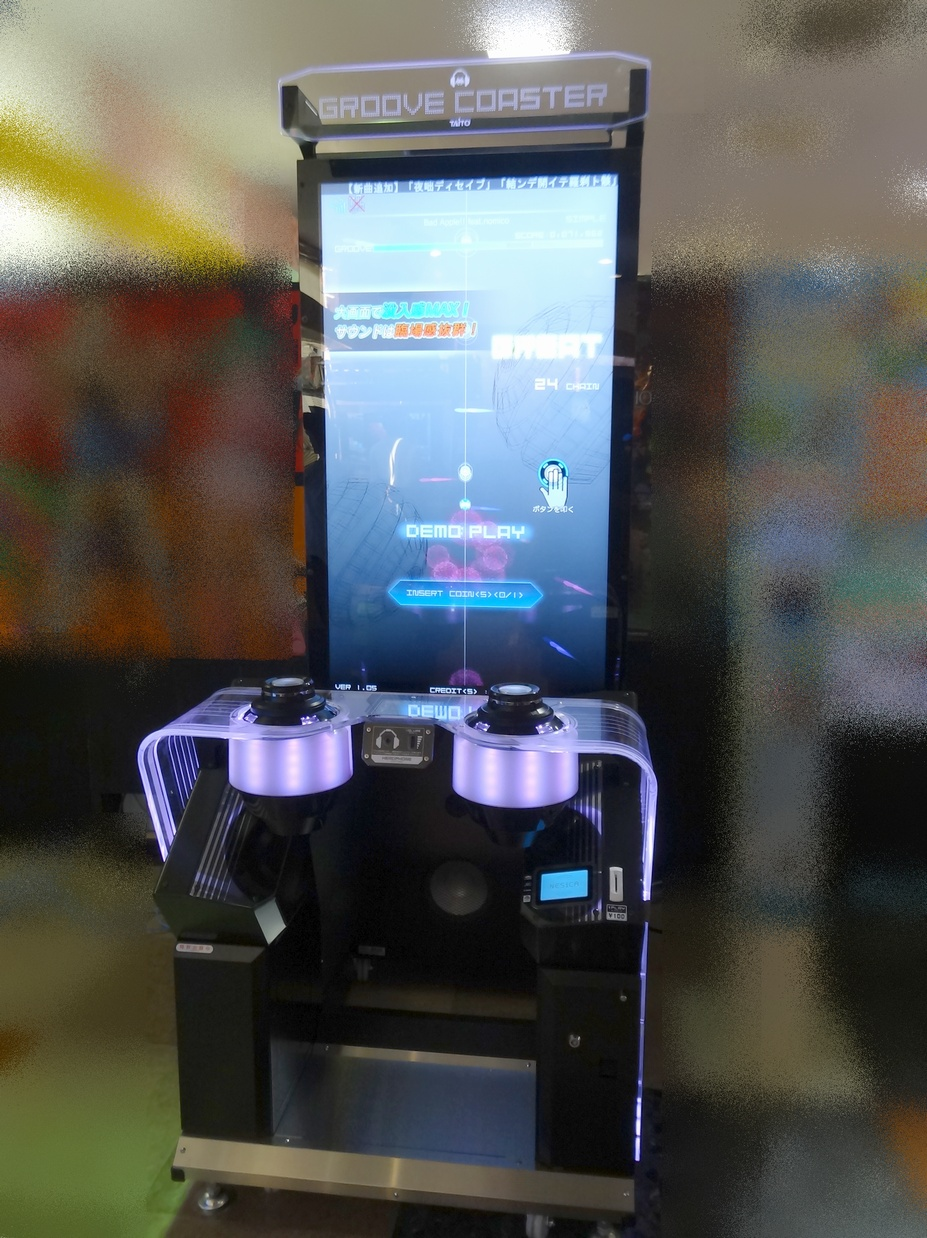
Groove Coaster arcade machine

When the avatar reaches the target, input the command that the target requires. After a target is hit, a judgment is received, from the highest to lowest: GREAT, COOL, GOOD and MISS, depending on the timing of hitting the target. GREAT, COOL and GOOD fill the GROOVE gauge on the top of the screen, while MISS depletes it (Starting from 4SR, the FAST or SLOW is displayed on the top-right of the avatar, if COOL and GOOD is received). The player is required to fill up at least 70% of the GROOVE gauge to clear the stage (the gauge will flash in white in iOS version, yellow in arcade version) when the song ends, otherwise fails it.

When the target is hit, the target triggers a sound sample that recomposes or accompanies the song, or is a consistent sound for every target hit, depending on the song; these samples are consistent across all difficulties for the former. However, in Groove Coaster: Wai Wai Party!!!!, targets will always play a consistent sound when hit, with different sounds for different target types, which can be configured by style and/or volume.

As the player continuously hits the target successfully, the CHAIN count will increase. FEVER is activated when CHAIN count reaches 10, and CHAIN number acquired from each successful hit will be doubled in FEVER. In arcade version, TRANCE is activated when CHAIN count reaches 100, and CHAIN number acquired from each successful hit will be quadrupled in TRANCE. However, if the player misses a target, the CHAIN count will be reset and FEVER or TRANCE will end.

After the player finished a song, a RATING (RATE in arcade version) is given, from lowest to highest, E, D, C, B, A, and S (two higher RATING, S+ and S++, are added in the EX and 2OS versions), according to the performance.

The player selects the song first, then the mode to play. However, not all the modes are initially available.

- In 2OS, each song contains EASY, NORMAL, HARD, and for some songs that contains arcade mode stages, AC-EASY, AC-NORMAL, and AC-HARD. HARD, AC-EASY, AC-NORMAL can be unlocked by clearing NORMAL, while AC-HARD can be unlocked by clearing AC-NORMAL.
- In arcade version, each song contains SIMPLE, NORMAL and HARD. Some songs also contains EXTRA, which can be unlocked by getting S-Rank on SIMPLE, NORMAL, and HARD mode of the same song. Starting from 4SR, for the stage with the difficulty of 11 and above, the player need an S-Rank on either one of the stage that contains the difficulty that is lower by 1 than the target difficulty to unlock (For example, to unlock Level 11 the player need an S-Rank on one of the Level 10 stages, and so on.), making two locks on most of the EXTRA mode stages.

== Multiplayer Matching (Arcade version only) ==
In the arcade version, multiplayer matches are separated into two types: Local Matching and Online Matching.

=== Local Matching (Multiplayer Mode) ===
The player can start the play in multiplayer mode. Once a player starts recruiting, a 90-second countdown will start. Other players (up to three more, which can make a four-player match) can join the match before the countdown ends. The recruiting player can also end the recruitment by pressing the BOOSTER button.

Stage selecting is almost the same as single-player mode. Any player can decide the song that will be played in the match. Each player selects their own mode, items, and skins. However, EXTRA mode selecting goes differently. If the songs that contain EXTRA mode were selected by the player that has already unlocked the mode, then all the players can select EXTRA mode. If not, then only the player who has already unlocked the mode can select it.

=== Online Matching (Event Play) ===
The system will recruit players from all over the world. Usually, the match begins when the fourth player is recruited. However, a two- or three-player match will be triggered if the system cannot find enough players in a period of time.

Each player selects the song they want to play in a set list. When all players finish selecting, the system will select a song from the players' choices via roulette. The players then select their own mode, items, and skins. The EXTRA mode will be unavailable if the player has not yet unlocked it.

=== Gameplay ===
In the stage, the player's own avatar is shown on the course line, while other players are shown beside it. Also, the player's own rank is shown right below the avatar. (Note: If ALONE or NO INFO is in effect then the other player's avatar and rank will be hidden.) As the stage progresses, the relative position of the players' avatars will differ, depending on their own play scores.

When the stage ends, a match result screen will be shown. From 2, the player competes with each other with total number of stars earned from three tunes. The player with the most stars wins the match. In 3LF, for some rewards, the star given to players will increase in later Tunes, making the game easier to be reversed if any mistake is made. Also the number of stars the player gets in Online Matching will become Battle Point reward, which can be used to compete with others in the Event. Playing in multiplayer mode lets the player receive bonus EXP reward (GC reward in 2) and one extra "MUSIC PANEL".

== Critical reception ==
The original, mobile version of the game had a Metacritic rating of 87% based on 21 critic reviews.

SlideToPlay said "We don't know what Space Invaders are doing in a rhythm game, but we like it." IGN wrote "Nearly perfect. The music is great. The visuals are great. The rhythm action itself feels tight and perfectly matches each tune. Best of all, this is an experience that would be very hard to replicate on a traditional platform – this is a game built from the ground-up for iPhone, and it shows." The AV Club said "Its elegance surpasses some of its antecedents, like Osu! Tatke! Ouendan!" AppSafari wrote "The bigger screen is nice, but the levels scales so well, you won't miss out by using a smaller one." GamePro said "Groove Coaster is a textbook example of how to make an iOS game correctly. Simple one-finger controls and quick play sessions belie a game with a considerable amount of depth and replay value." DaGameboyz wrote "It's definitely one of the "must plays" of the iOS, and at only $2.99 on the App Store, you should go grab it right now!" Pocket Gamer UK said "Gorgeous, challenging and thrillingly different, Groove Coaster is a treat for the eyes, the ears, and the soul." Gamezebo said "The only real complaint to be had with Groove Coaster is that there isn't more of it." 148Apps said "Just as crazy-awesome a game as one would expect to get from the people who brought us Space Invaders-Infinity Gene." Multiplayer.it said "Groove Coaster is another little masterpiece by Reisuke Ishida; a great rhythm game that fits perfectly on the Apple devices and that any lover of the genre should check out."

Eurogamer said "Groove Coaster still lacks enough of a challenge to be interesting, and it's only when you play each song on hard that the game's potential reveals itself. Even then, it's unlikely that hardcore rhythm action fiends will care much for its casual approach." MetroCentral said "One of the best marriages of gameplay, graphics and music ever seen on a portable and a triumphant return to the roots of rhythm action." Modojo wrote "A wonderful fusion of stimulating graphics, music and touch based play, making it an essential download for iPhone and iPad users. Great job, Taito." VideoGamer said "Groove Coaster isn't as ambitious a project as Space Invaders Infinity Gene, but it's certainly more fun while it lasts. Whether it's flying along at juddering right angles, or gently cruising around a relaxing curve, Groove Coaster is a consistently enjoyable audiovisual experience." TouchArcade said "Groove Coaster is a good game with a fundamental flaw. It also has a few nit-picky problems, too, like its spectacularly abrupt ending and horrible "How To," but the strength of its presentation, music, and RPG-lite systems make up for anything that could sour the experience." AppSpy said "While it's not the first time we've seen this blending of visual style and rhythm-based gameplay, Groove Coaster is none-the-less a unique experience that constantly rewards players for delving in again and again." TouchGen wrote "It doesn't quite offer the same originality in gameplay as Bit Trip beat, but its attack on your senses will knock your socks off, and more than makes up for it. Beautiful!"
