= Torneko: The Last Hope =

1999 video game

- North American box art
- Developers: Chunsoft; Matrix Software
- Publisher: Enix
- Directors: Fukashi Omorita; Yasuhiro Ohori; Kenji Orimo
- Producer: Seiichiro Nagahata
- Designer: Seiichiro Nagahata
- Programmer: Masayasu Yamamoto
- Artist: Akira Toriyama
- Writers: Kazuya Asano; Ichiro Tezuka
- Composer: Koichi Sugiyama
- Series: Mystery Dungeon
- Platforms: PlayStation, Game Boy Advance
- Release: PlayStation: JP: September 15, 1999; NA: November 16, 2000; Game Boy Advance: JP: December 20, 2001
- Genres: Role-playing, roguelike
- Mode: Single-player

Torneko: The Last Hope (Note: Known in Japan as Dragon Quest Characters: Torneko no Daibōken 2 – Fushigi no Dungeon (ドラゴンクエストキャラクターズ トルネコの大冒険2 不思議のダンジョン, Doragon Kuesuto Kyarakutāzu Torneko no Daibōken 2 Fushigi no Danjon; lit. Dragon Quest Characters: Torneko's Great Adventure 2 – Mystery Dungeon)) is a 1999 role-playing video game for the PlayStation. The game was co-developed by Chunsoft and Matrix Software and published by Enix. In Japan, the game was ported to the Game Boy Advance in 2001. (Note: Known in Japan as Dragon Quest Characters: Torneko no Daibōken 2 Advance – Fushigi no Dungeon (ドラゴンクエストキャラクターズ トルネコの大冒険2アドバンス 不思議のダンジョン, Doragon Kuesuto Kyarakutāzu Torneko no Daibōken 2 Adobansu Fushigi no Danjon; lit. Dragon Quest Characters: Torneko's Great Adventure 2 Advance – Mystery Dungeon))

Torneko: The Last Hope is a spin-off title of the Dragon Quest franchise and the second Mystery Dungeon game to star the Dragon Quest IV character Torneko. It is also the second game in the Mystery Dungeon series to be released in North America, after Chocobo's Dungeon 2. Like in Torneko no Daibōken: Fushigi no Dungeon, Torneko (or Taloon, as he was known in Dragon Warrior IV) explores dungeons in search of items, while fighting hordes of monsters.

== Gameplay ==
The game is done with two dimensional graphics and an overhead perspective of the games activities. The main gameplay involves Torneko exploring mazelike dungeons in search of items. When players first start conquering dungeons, Torneko continuously returns to level one strength and loses all his items until he rebuilds his storehouse. Temporary saves are sometimes allowed mid-dungeon, but these are erased as soon as players resume play. Combat against monsters is turn-based, with player and enemies alternating movements and actions. Torneko can attack with close range weapons like swords, long range like bow and arrow, or magic spells summoned with a wand or scroll. Torneko also has a hunger meter which causes him to lose health if he does not eat bread. During his exploration, Torneko can discover treasure and magic items.

== Plot ==
The plot for Torneko: The Last Hope happens after the events of Dragon Quest IV, and half a year after Torneko no Daibōken: Fushigi no Dungeon. Torneko returns to his village and is forced to help cure his village of a curse that has been placed upon it.

== Development and release ==
On April 18, 2000, Enix announced its first three games to be made for the original PlayStation, of which Torneko: The Last Hope was one. The game features 130 hand drawn monsters.

A 2013 news article wrote that based on forum posts by Nob Ogasawara, one of the game's editors, The Last Hope was only localized in the United States because of the passion of the translation team and their agreement to work for much less than normal. In a 2020 interview, Ogasawara clarified that the localization team largely consisted of himself; according to him, the original translation company "made a total mess of things", produced no usable text, and wasted most of the budget and deadline, so he personally with his editor and kids finished the work in three weeks.

Torneko: The Last Hope was released for the PlayStation on September 15, 1999, in Japan. Its U.S. release occurred over a year later, on November 16, 2000. Finally, its Game Boy Advance port was released exclusively in Japan on December 20, 2001.

== Music ==
The musical score for Torneko: The Last Hope was composed by Dragon Quest series composer, Koichi Sugiyama. The original game soundtrack from the PlayStation version was released by SPE Visual Works on January 21, 2000, in Japan on a single 21-track disc.

== Reception ==
Reception

Aggregate score
Aggregator	Score
Metacritic	66/100

Review scores
Publication	Score
Electronic Gaming Monthly	4.5/10
Famitsu	(PS) 37/40 (GBA) 36/40
Game Informer	2.75/10
GameSpot	6.9/10
IGN	6/10
Next Generation	1/5
Official U.S. PlayStation Magazine	2/5
PlayStation: The Official Magazine	1/10
RPGamer	7/10
RPGFan	89%

Torneko: The Last Hope was a financial and critical success in Japan. The PlayStation version of the game sold over 578,000 units in Japan the year of its release. The Game Boy Advance version of the game had sold over 181,000 units in Japan by 2007. Famitsu gave the game a score of 37 out of 40 for the PS version, and all four nines for a total of 36 out of 40 for the GBA version. Additionally, the game was voted by the publication as number 31 in its top 100 PlayStation games of all time. The game was also nominated for “Game of the Year” by CESA.

The PlayStation version of Torneko: The Last Hope did not sell well in North America and received "average" reviews according to the review aggregation website Metacritic. RPGFan called the game "frustratingly difficult," but said that its "addictive gameplay elements and top-notch soundtrack" make it a marvelous game. Jeff Gerstmann of GameSpot said that a lot of role-playing game players would be turned off by its lack of story and randomly generated dungeons, but those who are looking for some lighter fare of role-playing game may like it. Other critics scored the game much lower, however. Erik Reppen of Game Informer called it "an outdated, ugly piece of crap whose silly antics will charm no one. There are so many better RPGs out there." Eric Bratcher of NextGen called it "A primitive, turn-based dungeon crawler that takes so many cheap shots it could tick off a Buddhist monk." Mikel Tidwell of RPGamer called the game simple but fun, and it was mostly for those who already like rogue like games with randomized dungeons. He did, however, find the game to have amusing dialogue and the music for each dungeon matches it “remarkably well”.

Decades after the game's release, an interview with product manager of Shiren the Wanderer: The Mystery Dungeon of Serpentcoil Island, Hideyuki Shinozaki, hinted at the possibility to re-release Torneko: The Last Hope on modern platforms, thanks to the success of the former in Japan.
