= Brunca (disambiguation) =

Brunca is one of six socioeconomic regions of Costa Rica.

Brunca may also refer to:

- Brunca (Bithynia), a town of ancient Bithynia
- Boruca people
- Boruca language
- Brunca Sign Language
