= Chubby Groove =

Studio album by Inaba/Salas
- Released: January 18, 2017
- Genre: Dance-rock, pop rock, funk rock, alternative rock, hard rock
- Length: 45:31
- Label: Vermillion
- Producer: Koshi Inaba & Stevie Salas

Koshi Inaba chronology
Singing Bird (2014)	Chubby Groove (2017)	Maximum Huavo (2020)

Stevie Salas chronology
Jam Power (2010)	Chubby Groove (2017)	Maximum Huavo (2020)

Chubby Groove is a collaborative studio album by Japanese singer Koshi Inaba, of B'z fame, and Native American musician Stevie Salas. It was released by Vermillion Records on January 18, 2017.

== Overview ==
The album debuted at #2 at the Japanese Oricon weekly album charts, while #2 at Top Albums Sales and #4 Hot Albums chart list by Billboard Japan. It also reached #44 at the Billboard Japan Top Albums Sales Year End 2017, and #47 at Oricon's year end chart, being certified Gold by RIAJ.

The song "Overdrive" was used in Japan in a commercial for the new Porsche Panamera and "Trophy" was the image song for the 2017 Wowow Tennis Season. "Aishi-Aisare" peaked at #62 in the Japan Hot 100 Singles chart, spending one week there.

== Track listing ==
All lyrics are written by Koshi Inaba; all music is composed by Stevie Salas, except "Blink", co-written by Parthenon Huxley.

No.	Title	Length
1.	"Sayonara River"	3:48
2.	"Overdrive"	3:12
3.	"Wabisabi"	3:14
4.	"Aishi-Aisare" (Love, Be Loved)	3:33
5.	"シラセ (Shirase)" (The News)	4:19
6.	"Error Message"	3:52
7.	"Nishi-Higashi" (East-West)	3:18
8.	"苦悩の果てのそれも答えのひとつ (Kunou no Hate no Sore mo Kotae no Hitotsu)" (What Lies at the End of Agony is Also an Answer)	3:29
9.	"Marie"	3:29
10.	"Blink"	4:53
11.	"My Heart Your Heart"	3:49
12.	"Trophy"	4:35
Total length:		45:31

== Personnel ==
- Koshi Inaba – lead vocals, lyrics, acoustic guitar on "Sayonara River", Pow wow drums and backing vocals on "Trophy"
- Stevie Salas – guitar, music, keyboards on "Sayonara River" and "Error Message", backing vocals on tracks 8, 10 and 12, drums and percussion on "Blink" and "Trophy", pow wow drums on "Trophy"

=== Additional personnel ===
Backing vocals

- Bernard Fowler on "Shirase" and "Nishi-Higashi"
- Luis Montalbert-Smith on tracks 8, 10 and 12
- ao on "Marie"
- Parthenon Huxley on "Blink"
- Rob Lamothe, Taylor Hawkins, Adrian Harjo and Logan Staats on "Trophy"

Additional guitars

- Nard Berings on "Aishi-Aisare"
- Tim Palmer on tracks 4, 6 and 10
- Federico Miranda on "Blink"

Bass

- Armand Sabal-Lecco on tracks 2, 3, 6 and 7
- Shawn Davis on "Shirase" and "Marie"
- Juan Alderete on "Kunou no Hate no Sore mo Kotae no Hitotsu"
- Abel Guier on "Blink"
- Dorian Heartsong and Stuart Zender on "Trophy"

Drums and percussion

- Matt Sherrod on tracks 1–3, 6–8 and 11, Glockenspiel on "My Heart Your Heart"
- Mark Shulman on "Aishi-Aisare"
- Massimo Hernandez and Matt Sorum on "Blink"
- Taylor Hawkins on "Blink" and "Trophy", rock drums on "Trophy"
- Steve Ferrone – drums on "Shirase"
- David Leach – percussion on "Shirase"
- Denny Seiwell – percussion on "Nishi-Higashi"
- Adrian Harjo and Logan Staats – pow wow drums on "Trophy"

Keyboards

- Amp Fiddler on tracks 1, 2, 6, 8 and 9
- Hideyuki Terachi on "Sayonara River" and "Error Message"
- Lou Pomanti on tracks 5, 7, 9, 11 and 12
- Matt Sherrod on "Error Message" and "My Heart Your Heart"
- Ricky Peterson on "Nishi-Hiashi"
- Luis Montalbert-Smith and Tim Palmer on "Blink"

Other musicians

- Hideyuki Terachi – pre-production programming
- Nard Berings – electronic treatment on tracks 1, 3, 7 and 12, programming on "Aishi-Aisare"
- Matt Sherrod – electronic treatment on "Nishi Shigashi", programming
- Lou Pomanti – electronic treatment on "Blink"
- Jean Marie Horvat – heartbeat on "My Heart Your Heart"

=== Technical personnel ===
- Koshi Inaba – production
- Stevie Salas – production
- Tim Palmer – mixing, engineering
- Justin Shturtz – mastering
- Alberto Oritz – engineering
- Erich Gobel – engineering
- ET Thorngren – engineering
- Hiroyuki Kobayashi – engineering
- Mark Williams – engineering
- Misha Pecheco – engineering
- Rob Lamothe – engineering
- Nard Berings – engineering
- Dorian Heartsong – engineering
- Stuart Zender – engineering
- Matt Sherrod – engineering
- Lou Pomanti – engineering

== Charts ==
=== Weekly charts ===
Chart (2017)	Peak position
Japanese Albums (Oricon)	2
Japanese Hot Albums (Billboard Japan)	4

=== Year-end charts ===
Chart (2017)	Position
Japanese Albums (Oricon)	47
Japanese Albums (Billboard Japan)	44

== Certifications ==
Region	Certification	Certified units/sales
Japan (RIAJ)	Gold	100,000^{^}
^{^} Shipments figures based on certification alone.
