= Parque en el Espacio =

Costa Rican indie rock band

- Origin: San José, Costa Rica
- Genres: Trip rock Alternative rock Music of Costa Rica
- Years active: 2001–present
- Members: Zurdo; Camilo Poltronieri; Abel Guier; Wash
- Website: parqueenelespacio.bandcamp.com

Parque en el Espacio is a popular Costa Rican indie rock band. Formed by Fernán Castro 'Zurdo' (voice and rhythmic guitar), Abel Guier (bass guitar), Camilo Poltronieri (lead guitar) and Luis Fernando Ruiz 'Wash' (drums). The band was originally formed in early 2001, and was first an electronic fusion trio, with a light trip hop sound. Over the years there have been many facets and musicians, but the current members appeared between 2004 and 2005. The four members come from other very well known bands form Costa Rica, such as Evolución, Gandhi (Gandhi (Costa Rican band)) and Mekatelyu. The only original member is Zurdo, who also has a popular electronic fusion duo called Santos&Zurdo.

Their first album was called "In a World of My Own", although the band did not have all the current members and they sounded more like electronic rock. Their second album "Hello Hello" was released in April 2007. This album included their first single "Erase". The album was more of a rock and roll album. Both albums have been nominated to the ACAM Awards, on different categories. The ACAM Awards are at present the only official recognition of musical works, ACAM is Costa Rica's Musical Author's guild.

Chilean director Esteban Zabala directed the video for the song Erase, which was filmed at Volcán Irazú, on a very difficult to access location, where the country's main transmitting antennas are located. Esteban Zabala is well known for videos of bands like Plastilina Mosh, Ely Guerra and Evolución.

The band became more famous when they made the line up en route to the popular "Festival Imperial" on April 19, 2008. They usually play in most of the country's music festivals. Their latest was at the inauguration of the National Stadium, on April 2, 2011. This festival featured over 20 of Costa Rica's most representative bands, and gathered a crowd of 24,000 people.

The release of their latest hit on July 28, 2010, entitled " (The) Stars EP, a work in progress" has been a huge success in Costa Rica and in Hispanic America. The most famous song from this album is "Fork in the Road". The album was produced by 'Automata' in San José, Costa Rica and later masterized by World Mastering Studios in England, UK.

Parque en el Espacio is currently working on their new album (The) Atoms EP. There is no date scheduled for the release.
