= Ciclos =

Ciclos may refer to:

- Ciclos (Luis Enrique album), 2009
- Ciclos (Sol D'Menta album), 2006
- Ciclos (Gandhi album) 2004
