= Koshi Inaba =

Japanese musician (born 1964)

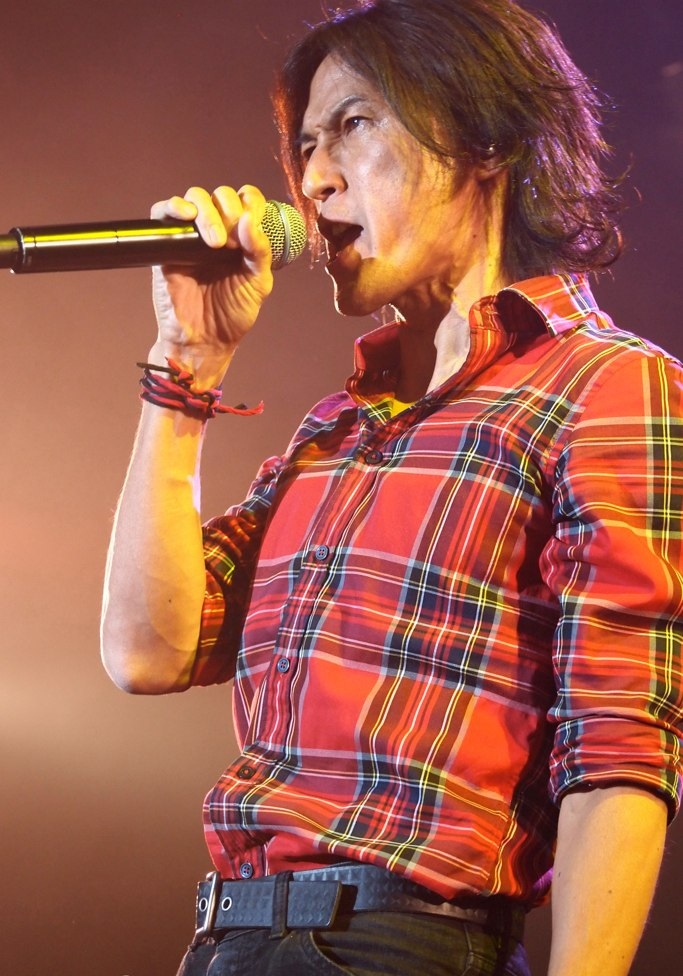
- Inaba performing in 2012

Background information
- Born: Hiroshi Inaba; September 23, 1964 (age 61); Tsuyama, Okayama, Japan
- Genres: Hard rock; folk rock; pop rock; blues rock
- Occupations: Musician, singer, songwriter
- Instruments: Vocals; guitar; piano; harmonica; maracas; mandolin
- Years active: 1985–present
- Labels: Room; Vermillion
- Member of: B'z
- Website: Official web site

Koshi Inaba (Japanese: 稲葉浩志, Hepburn: Inaba Kōshi; born September 23, 1964) is a Japanese singer, songwriter and multi-instrumentalist. He is best known as the vocalist and lyricist of the rock duo B'z, the best-selling music act in their native Japan. He also has a successful solo career, with six studio albums and five singles topping the Japanese music charts. Inaba collaborated with Slash on the latter's 2009 single "Sahara", and with Stevie Salas on the albums Chubby Groove (2017) and Maximum Huavo (2020).

== Early life ==
Koshi Inaba was born and raised in Tsuyama, Okayama, and enrolled in Yokohama National University's Faculty for Education in 1983 to become a qualified mathematics teacher. Inaba made his musical debut in 1985 whilst still a student, contributing vocals to Toshiya "Ran" Matsukawa's album Burning ~Dedication to Randy Rhoads~ under the stage name Mr. Crazy Tiger. He graduated in 1987 when he also formed a short-lived band.

== B'z and solo career ==
Beginning with B'z in 1988, Inaba has, together with guitarist Tak Matsumoto, continued to release new material and tour as part of B'z almost every year since. He has also periodically released solo material, starting in 1997 with the album Magma, produced whilst B'z were on a brief hiatus. It was one of the albums to receive the "Best Rock Album of the Year" award at the 12th Japan Gold Disc Awards. Unlike in B'z, where he contributes only lyrics, Inaba has composed the music for his solo releases. All his studio albums and singles until now have topped the Oricon music charts. Additionally, the first studio album with 1,001,160 sold copies was the 21st best-selling album of the year, second Shian with 438,930 copies was the 39th in 2002, third Peace of Mind with 297,103 copies was 48th in 2004, fourth Hadou with 177,984 was 38th in 2010, and Singing Bird with 107,551 was certified Gold by RIAJ. As for singles, "Tooku Made" with 663,660 sold copies was the 28th best-selling single of the year 1999, "Ki" with 275,957 copies was 25th in 2003, "Wonderland" with 225,229 copies was 36th in 2004, "Okay" with 134,381 copies was 45th in 2010, and "Hane" was certified Gold and was 51st in 2016. His live video recordings also topped the charts, hence cumulatively, according to reported yearly sales and certifications he sold over 3.4 million records.

Inaba has also sung on other artists' releases, such as the Steve Vai song "Asian Sky" from the album The Ultra Zone in 1999. On September 29, 2009, it was announced that Inaba would be featured in Slash's 2010 solo album, Slash. Inaba sang on the first single, "Sahara", released on November 11, 2009, in Japan. The song, for which Inaba wrote the lyrics, was featured as the 15th track of the Japanese edition of the album. The single charted at #4 on the Oricon weekly singles chart. On February 24, 2010, it was announced that single "Sahara" won the Western "Single of the Year" award at Japan Gold Disc Award held by RIAJ. In 2017, Inaba released a collaborative album with Stevie Salas under the name "Inaba/Salas". The album, Chubby Groove, went to #2 in the Japanese album charts and was certified Gold by RIAJ. Hiroshi Inaba takes care of his physical condition by not drinking alcohol and not using the air conditioning much during the tour to protect his throat. Marty Friedman once listed Hiroshi Inaba as the best vocalist in the whole world. The reason for this, he says, is that his voice hasn't faded after more than 20 years of singing hard rock songs. He performed the Japanese dubbing voice for Clay Calloway in Sing 2.

== Discography ==
=== Albums ===
==== As soloist ====
Title	Album details	Peak chart positions
Title	Album details	JPN Oricon
Magma (マグマ)	Released: January 29, 1997; Label: Vermillion; Formats: CD, digital download, streaming	1
Shian (志庵)	Released: October 9, 2002; Label: Vermillion; Formats: CD, digital download, streaming	1
Peace of Mind	Released: September 22, 2004; Label: Vermillion; Formats: CD, digital download, streaming	1
Hadou (ハドウ)	Released: August 18, 2010; Label: Vermillion; Formats: CD, digital download, streaming	1
Singing Bird	Released: May 21, 2014; Label: Vermillion; Formats: CD, digital download, streaming	1
Tadamono (只者)	Released: June 26, 2024; Label: Vermillion; Formats: CD, digital download, streaming	1

==== As Inaba/Salas ====
Title	Album details	Peak chart positions
Title	Album details	JPN Oricon
Chubby Groove	Released: January 18, 2017; Label: Vermillion; Formats: CD, digital download, streaming	2
Maximum Huavo	Released: April 15, 2020; Label: Vermillion; Formats: CD, digital download, streaming	1
Atomic Chihuahua	Released: February 26, 2025; Label: Vermillion; Formats: CD	2

=== Singles ===
Year	Album	Chart positions (JP)	Label
1998	"Tooku Made" (遠くまで)	1	Rooms
2003	"Ki"	1	Rooms
2004	"Wonderland"	1	Rooms
2010	"Okay"	1	Rooms
2016	"Hane" (羽)	1	Rooms

==== Digital Exclusive Singles ====
Year	Single	Reference
2014	"Nensho" (念書)	
2014	"Nakinagara" (泣きながら)	
2014	"Stay Free"	
2014	"Saturday"	
2016	"Yellow"	
2023	"Bantam"	
2023	"Stray Hearts"	
2024	"Now"	

=== Other appearances ===
List of non-studio album or guest appearances that feature Koshi Inaba
Title	Year	Artist	Album/Single
"Asian Sky"	1999	Steve Vai	The Ultra Zone
"Katte ni Shiyagare"	2003	Tak Matsumoto	The Hit Parade
"Sahara"	2010	Slash	Slash
"As long as I Love", "Scratch"	2022	Toru Kitajima	As long as I Love/Scratch
"Hikigane"	2024	Matsumoto	The Hit Parade II

=== Videography ===
List of home-video releases, with selected chart positions
Title	Album details	Peak positions
Title	Album details	JPN Oricon
Live 2004 ~en~	Released: December 22, 2004; Label: Vermillion; Formats: VHS, DVD	1
Live 2010 ~en II~	Released: February 16, 2010; Label: Vermillion; Formats: DVD, Blu-Ray	1
Live 2010 ~en ball~	Released: November 18, 2015; Label: Vermillion; Formats: DVD, Blu-Ray	2
Live 2016 ~enIII~	Released: August 3, 2016; Label: Vermillion; Formats: DVD, Blu-Ray	1
Live 2024 ~enIV~	Released: August 27, 2025; Label: Vermillion; Formats: DVD, Blu-Ray	1

== Songwriting credits ==
List of songs written or co-written for other artists, showing year released and album name
Title	Year	Artist(s)	Album
"Heaven in my heart"	1991	Yuiko Tsubokura	Loving You
"Go-Go-Girls"	1991	Yuiko Tsubokura	I Wanna be myself
"Siren"	2005	Doa	Open_D
"Pierrot"	2006	Aya Kamiki	Secret Code
"Shalala Ayakashi Night, My Mirai, Kajitsu, Diet Now, Fiction Tengoku, Journey"	2007	Saeko Ura	Juke Vox
"Heat"	2012	Kim Hyun-joong	Unlimited
"One and Only"	2019	Takuya Kimura	Go With the Flow
"Dignity"	2023	Ado	Zanmu

== See also ==
- B'z
- Tak Matsumoto
