= Singing Bird =

Studio album by Koshi Inaba
- Released: May 21, 2014, Japan
- Genre: Hard rock, pop rock
- Length: 49:16
- Label: Vermillion Records (Japan)
- Producer: Koshi Inaba

Koshi Inaba chronology
Hadou (2010)	Singing Bird (2014)	Chubby Groove (w/ Stevie Salas) (2017)

Singles from Singing Bird
- 1. "Nensho" Released: February 26, 2014; 2. "Nakinagara" Released: March 26, 2014; 3. "Stay Free" Released: April 23, 2014

Singing Bird is the fifth solo studio album by Japanese singer Koshi Inaba, of B'z fame. It was released by Vermillion Records on May 21, 2014, in Japan. The album debuted at No. 1 at the Japanese Oricon weekly album charts and at No. 2 at the Billboard Japan Top Albums chart, besides reaching 39# at Oricon's 2014 year-end chart. The song "Oh My Love" received a video and was used at a commercial of a new camera by Olympus. The video featured Japanese football player Keisuke Honda.

== Track listing ==
All tracks are written by Koshi Inaba

No.	Title	Length
1.	"ジミーの朝 (Jimmy no Asa)" (Jimmy's Morning)	3:24
2.	"Oh My Love"	4:33
3.	"Cross Creek"	3:19
4.	"Golden Road"	4:12
5.	"泣きながら (Nakinagara)" (While Crying)	4:28
6.	"Stay Free"	4:09
7.	"Bicycle Girl"	3:43
8.	"孤独のススメ (Kodoku no Susume)" (Encouragement of Loneliness)	4:02
9.	"友よ (Tomoyo)" (Friend)	3:59
10.	"Photograph"	5:14
11.	"ルート53 (Route 53)"	4:58
12.	"念書 (Nensho)" (Written Pledge)	3:15
Total length:		49:16

== Personnel ==
- Koshi Inaba – vocals on all tracks, guitar on "Jimmy no Asa" and "Cross Creek", acoustic guitar on "Tomoyo", djembe on "Jimmy no Asa", blues harp on "Route 53" and "Nensho", electric sitar

=== Session members ===
- Yoshinobu Ōga – guitar on tracks 2, 4, 6, 10, 12
- Rafael Moreira – guitar on "Cross Creek", "Bicycle Girl" and "Kodoku no Susume"
- Yogi Ronitchi – electric and acoustic guitar on "Tomoyo", guitar on "Route 53"
- Akihito Tokunaga – arrangement on "Stay Free" and "Kodoku no Susume", bass on tracks 3, 4, 6, 8, 10, 12
- Taneda Takeshi – bass on "Oh My Love" and "Route 56"
- Corey McCormick – bass on "Bicycle Girl"
- Koichi Osame – bass on "Tomoyo"
- Shane Gaalaas – drums on all tracks except 1, 2, 4, 9, 11
- Hideo Yamaki – drums on "Tomoyo" and "Route 53"
- Satoko – drums on "Oh My Love"
- Akira Onozuka – organ on "Oh My Love" and "Route 53", piano on "Nakinagara" and "Nensho", organ on "Stay Free"
- Yamamoto Takuo – flute on "Jimmy no Asa", "Golden Road" and "Nakinagara"
- Yumiko Morooka – cello on "Jimmy no Asa"
- Hiroko Ishikawa and Lime Ladies Orchestra – strings on "Nakinagara", "Tomoyo" and "Route 53"
- Hideyuki Terachi – arrangement on all tracks except "Stay Free" and "Kodoku no Susume"
