= The Secret Code =

The Secret Code can refer to:

- The Secret Code (film), a 1918 film starring Gloria Swanson
- The Secret Code (serial), a 1942 film serial
- "The Secret Code" (Seinfeld), a television episode
- The Secret Code (album), by Tohoshinki (TVXQ), 2009
- Secret Code, an album by Aya Kamiki, 2006
