= Festival Imperial =

Music festival in Costa Rica

- Genre: Pop, Rock music
- Dates: April
- Locations: Autódromo La Guácima (9°58′24″N 84°14′58″W) in Alajuela, Costa Rica
- Years active: 2006, 2008, 2012
- Founders: Imperial beer (Cerveceria Costa Rica)
- Website: http://www.festivalimperial.com

Festival Imperial is a major Costa Rican music festival organized by Cerveceria Costa Rica and their flagship beer: Imperial. The first festival took place in April 2006 and brought world-known performers such as Sting, Jamiroquai, Diego Torres, and The Rasmus. The second edition of the festival was held in April 2008 and featured: Duran Duran, Incubus and Smashing Pumpkins among others.

Initially the festival was going to take place every two years, but on 2010 the organizers announced there was not going be a Festival Imperial that year due to sanitary reasons (AH1N1 Virus) and the world economic crisis.

On December 15, 2011 Cerveceria Costa Rica announced that, after four years of absence, the third edition of the Festival Imperial would take place on March 24 and 25 wil. The event will take place at the Autódromo La Guácima, a racetrack located in Alajuela, 20 minutes away from San José as it did on previous occasions.

== Festival Imperial 2006 ==
The 2006 edition featured 10 performers, both international and national. It was held on April 1 and 2. The headliners were Sting and Jamiroquai.

Saturday	Sunday
Jamiroquai; Gandhi; Diego Torres; Vicentico (Los Fabulosos Cadillacs); Belanova	Sting; Malpaís; The Rasmus; Miranda! Héctor el Father

The festival also featured other attractions including a secondary stage with electronic music and fashion shows, food courts and public transportation to the event.

== Festival Imperial 2008 ==
The 2008 edition was held on April 19 and 20. The headliners were Smashing Pumpkins and Duran Duran.

Saturday	Sunday
Smashing Pumpkins; Incubus; Cafe Tacvba; Babasónicos; Le*Pop	Duran Duran; Enrique Iglesias; Seal; Zoé; Porpartes

For this edition, a musical ensamble of national artists (Ensamble Nacional de Artistas) also performed covers of Costa Rican rock and pop music during the festival days. The ensamble featured the following artists: Marta Fonseca, Pedro Campmany, Pato Barrasa, Mechas (former Kadeho vocalist), and Bernardo Quesada.

In the months before the main event, Cerveceria Costa Rica also hosted free concerts with national and international bands like: Moderatto, Kumbia All Starz and Aleks Syntek. This plan was called "Ruta Festival" and the idea was to reveal little pieces of information regarding the Festival.

Ruta Festival also featured renowned national bands and artists like: Kurt Dyer, Parque en el Espacio, The Movement in Codes and Moonlight Dub Experiment.

== Festival Imperial 2012 ==
On January 31, 2012 Cerveceria Costa Rica revealed the official line up for the festival and also important information about the event. This year's festival is focused on indie and alternative music as opposed to previous years were the focus was rock music. They also increased the line up to 30 performers, a huge difference from previous years when they had about 10 performers.

Cerveceria Costa Rica confirmed during their press conference that they are looking for a new audience and a new way to experience Festival Imperial. They explained that this year the intention is to go beyond just music, they are inviting people to listen to new musical trends and they are advocating for a new way to live the festival.

They made many modifications, besides the format of the activity. One of them is that this year there will be 12 hours of music per day, from noon to midnight.

Another change is that there will be 3 stages instead of one. One of them will be dedicated completely to electronic music.

In order to achieve the festival concept, they joined forces with C3 Presents company responsible for producing festivals such as Lollapalooza and Austin City Limits Music Festival. C3 Presents provided most of the line up.

The international performers for Festival Imperial 2012 are Maroon 5, Björk, LMFAO, Moby (DJ Set), Ximena Sariñana, La Mala Rodríguez, Thievery Corporation, Cypress Hill, The Flaming Lips, Skrillex, TV on the Radio, Gogol Bordello, Major Lazer, Manchester Orchestra, Felix Martin & Al Doyle (Hot Chip) (DJ Set), A-Trak, Bomba Estéreo, Cage the Elephant and Bonobo (DJ Set), Porter Robinson

Part of the line up are the 10 Costa Rican bands, 8 of them have already been confirmed and the remaining 2 will be chosen in a contest via social media during the "Ruta Festival Imperial". The bands that have already been confirmed are 424, The Great Wilderness, Zópilot!, Akasha, Sonámbulo, Huba & Silica, Colornoise and Patiño Quintana.

Gustavo Cornejo, manager of the brand Imperial, announced in the next days they would be revealing 2 more international performers that will complete the line up for the electronic music stage for Festival Imperial 2012.

The two new bands added to Festival Imperial are Cage the Elephant and Bonobo (DJ Set), plus on the electronic stage DJ Shadow and Madeon were added as the last inclusions of Festival Imperial lineup.

On March 10, 2012, the last two national bands, Dissént and Alphabetics, were selected to be part of Festival Imperial 2012.
