= Great Wilderness =

Great Wilderness may refer to:

- Dundonnell and Fisherfield Forest
- The Great Wilderness, Costa Rican dream rock band
- Große Wildnis, extremely sparsely inhabited area of wilderness in northern East Central Europe during the Middle Ages along the borders between Prussia, Livonia and the Grand Duchy of Lithuania

== See also ==
- Wild Fields
