= Message to Venus =

- Origin: Puerto Rico
- Genres: Rock, hard rock
- Years active: 2008-present
- Label: Independent
- Members: Jandre Nadal; Edgar Ramos; John Feliciano; Juan Font
- Website: messagetovenus.com

Message to Venus (also known as M2V) is an American rock band from Puerto Rico that was formed in 2008 by Jandre Nadal. John Feliciano (guitar), Edgar Ramos (bass), and Juan Font (drums) then completed the current lineup.

== History ==
They are now based in Florida, United States. The band, once called De'fekt, changed their name after the rotations of members on their line up and are established now with John Feliciano, Edgar Ramos, Jandre Nadal, and Juan M Font. Feliciano is currently located in Miami and Edgar in Orlando. They all travel back and forth to join the other members and play important venues.

Nadal was a former member of the band called Slimy Nuggetz who has experience on playing at CBGB's and sharing stages with bands like Anthrax, Ill Niño, Puya, Circo, Caramelos de Cianuro, Sol D’Menta, and many more in nearly every Rock Fest in Puerto Rico for the past 10 years including U.S and South American tours. The other members gained local exposure when they were on De'fekt by opening for Ill Niño and Nonpoint among others in their home country of Puerto Rico.

In March 2010, Message to Venus released their first single, entitled "Cold & Grey," on online stores. The band started to play some venues in Miami, where Feliciano is located, and some in Puerto Rico. They release on February, a follow-up material in 2011, their EP titled "The Envelope". Message to Venus is the first band out of Puerto Rico to be played on the "When Worlds Collide" segment on SiriusXM Octane.

The band has played several shows between Miami and Puerto Rico. The band is currently recording a full-length album produced by Leo Alvarez following by moving completely to the States at the end of 2011.

== Band members ==
- Jandre Nadal - lead vocals, guitar
- John Feliciano - lead guitar
- Juan Font - drums
- Edgar Ramos - bass

== Discography ==
=== Studio albums ===
- Victims & Villains (2015)

=== Extended plays (EP) ===
- The Envelope (2011)

=== Singles ===
- Change (2012)
- Universal You (Emir Feliciano Remix) (2012)
- Universal You (2011)
- Cold & Grey (2010)
