= Rock in Roma =

Annual music festival held in Rome, Italy

Rock in Roma (Romarock Festival)
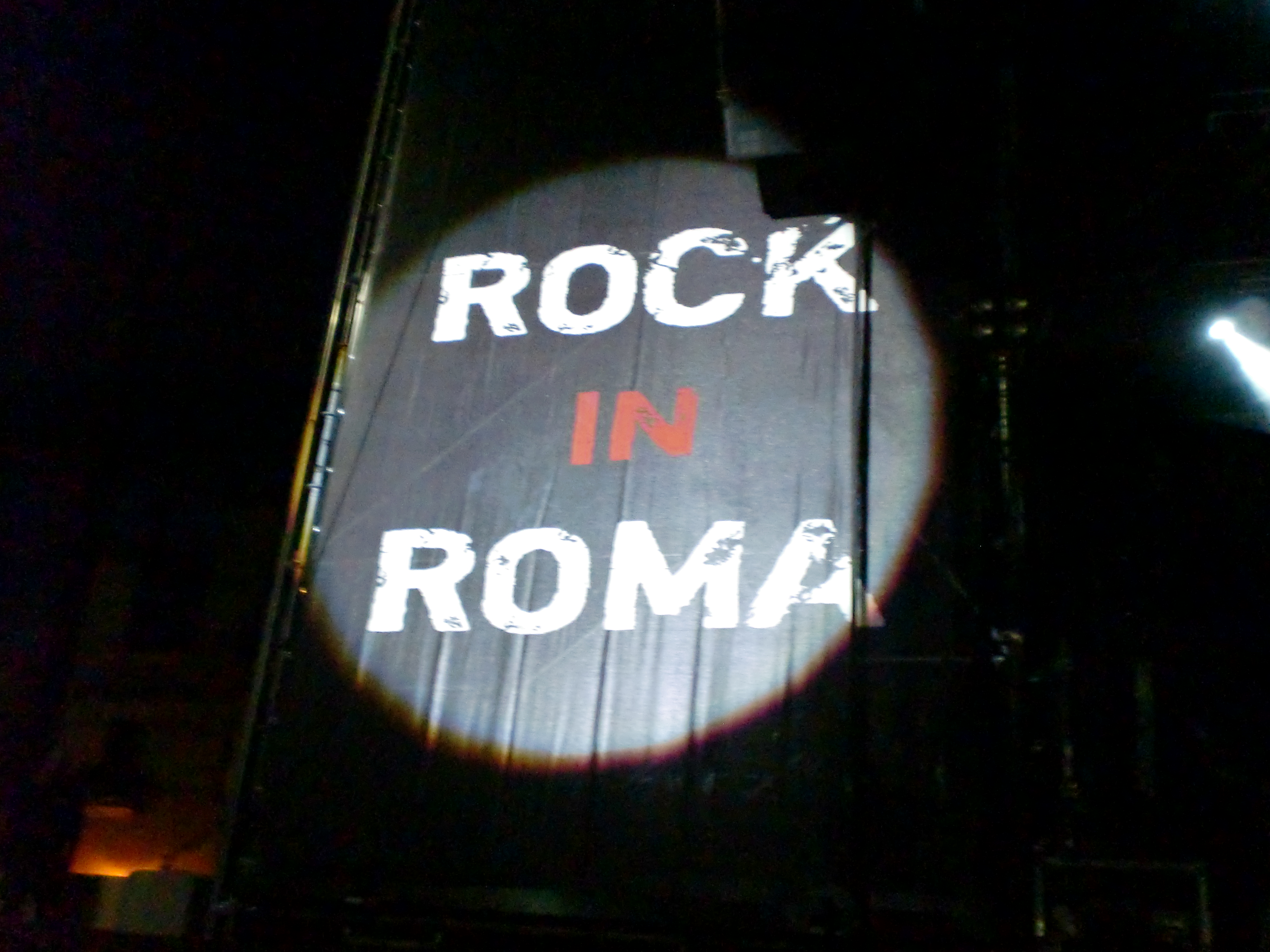
- Genre: Rock music
- Dates: June and July
- Location: Rome
- Years active: 2002-present
- Website: Official Site

The Rock in Rome (until its 2008 edition known as Romarock Festival) is a musical event that takes place annually in Rome at the Capannelle Racecourse usually at the turn of the months of June and July. Does not take place as a classic festival (i.e., it is not of one or more consecutive days in which more groups perform) but as a musical event in which, over a period of a month or so, several groups perform.

Among the artists, Mark Knopfler, Slash, The Chemical Brothers, Jamiroquai, Ben Harper, Toto, Korn, Thirty Seconds to Mars, Skunk Anansie, Franz Ferdinand, The Killers, Cranberries, Nine Inch Nails, Motörhead, ZZ Top, The Cure, Testament, Duran Duran, Dream Theater, Radiohead, Franco Battiato, Caparezza, Subsonica, Vinicio Capossela, Elio e Le Storie Tese, Litfiba, Rammstein, Atoms for Peace, Arctic Monkeys, Green Day, Blur, Iggy & The Stooges, Smashing Pumpkins, Bruce Springsteen.

Feature of the festival is the quality and variety of the line-up thus allowing the meeting of different cultures and musical genres.

During the three previous editions, more than 370,000 people have benefited from the setting Capannelle Racetrack taking part in shows and allowing the achievement dell'esaurito for several evenings. The 2011 edition has seen a total of about two hundred thousand appearances.

== Editions ==
=== 2002 ===
5 July	Banco del Mutuo Soccorso / Elettrojoyce
11 July	Franco Battiato

=== 2003 ===
20 June	Marlene Kuntz
4 July	Latte e i Suoi Derivati
15 July	Modena City Ramblers
23 July	Elio e le Storie Tese
2 agosto	Latte e i Suoi Derivati

=== 2004 ===
21 June	Elio e le Storie Tese
23 June	Verdena
26 June	Marlene Kuntz
6 July	Sean Paul
7 July	Air
8 July	Peter Gabriel
16 July	Modena City Ramblers
19 July	Latte e i Suoi Derivati / AnonimArmonisti

=== 2005 ===
16 June	Banco del Mutuo Soccorso / Cappello a Cilindro
7 July	Tori Amos / Tom McRae
8 July	Emir Kusturica & The No Smoking Orchestra
18 July	Jamiroquai
20 July	Negramaro

=== 2006 ===
5 July	Afterhours
19 July	Franco Battiato / Joan as Police Woman
21 July	Massive Attack
28 July	Daniele Silvestri

=== 2007 ===
30 June	Daniele Silvestri
1 July	Placebo
3 July	Peter Gabriel
4 July	Deasonika
13 July	Finley
16 July	Steve Vai
17 July	Ricky Martin
18 July	Avril Lavigne
20 July	Robert Plant

=== 2008 ===
19 June	LOB Tech Tones / Piergiorgio Lucidi
30 June	Francesco De Gregori
3 July	Subsonica
4 July	Fabrizio Moro
6 July	Tokio Hotel
11 July	Pino Daniele
12 July	Aventura
15 July	Fiorella Mannoia
16 July	Duran Duran
18 July	Massive Attack / Djavan
19 July	Shaggy / Max Pezzali
24 July	Finley
26 July	Ben Harper

=== 2009 ===
27 June	Subsonica
30 June	UB40
1 July	Vinicio Capossela & Calexico
2 July	Negrita
4 July	Marlene Kuntz
5 July	Testament / Kreator / Cathedral
6 July	Earth, Wind & Fire / Chic
8 July	P.F.M. canta De André
9 July	J-Ax
10 July	Marta Sui Tubi / Massimo Volume / Surgery
11 July	Bandabardò
14 July	The Killers / Franz Ferdinand / White Lies
15 July	Motörhead / Extrema / Merendine Atomiche
16 July	2 Many DJ's [ANNULLATO]
18 July	Caparezza
20 July	Afterhours / Morgan / Hike Has The Giggles
22 July	Nine Inch Nails / Animal Collective / TV on the Radio
24 July	Daniele Silvestri
25 July	Modena City Ramblers

=== 2010 ===
1 July	Heaven & Hell [ANNULLATO]
5 July	The Cranberries
6 July	Mika
7 July	The Gossip
12 July	ZZ Top
13 July	Ska-P / 99 Posse / Er Piotta / The Hormonauts
14 July	Baustelle / Nina Zilli
15 July	Skunk Anansie / Motel Connection
21 July	Afterhours
22 July	Litfiba
26 July	The Cult
27 July	Daniele Silvestri
28 July	Gary Moore

=== 2011 ===
18 June	Thirty Seconds to Mars + CB7
21 June	Avenged Sevenfold
23 June	Alessandro Mannarino
29 June	Korn + Extrema + Stillwell + DJ Kid Knuckles
30 June	Subsonica
3 July	Black Label Society + Archer
4 July	Dream Theater + Anathema + Gamma Ray
6 July	Afterhours + Cesare Malfatti
8 July	Mogwai + A Classic Education
9 July	Fabri Fibra
13 July	Chemical Brothers
15 July	Franco Battiato
16 July	Caparezza
17 July	Almamegretta & Raiz (reunion tour)
18 July	Daniele Silvestri
19 July	Robert Plant & The Band of Joy + Ben Harper
20 July	Skunk Anansie + Motel Connection
21 July	Elio e le Storie Tese + Nevruz + Le Ossa
22 July	Jamiroquai + Fabri Fibra
23 July	Jack Johnson + Kaki King
24 July	Moby (+ after show DJset)
29 July	Slash & Myles Kennedy+ Japanese Voyeur
30 July	Max Pezzali

=== 2012 ===
7 June	Afterhours & Afghan Whigs (Tenutosi all'Atlantico Live)
25 June	Incubus + Fin
26 June	Cypress Hill + Everlast + Dope D.O.D. + Noyz Narcos
27 June	Portishead
2 July	Deadmau5
3 July	Snoop Dogg +Cut Killer
5 July	Negrita
8 July	Justice + guest
9 July	The Cure + Crystal Castles + The Cranes + Paolo Benvegnù + Denimor
10 July	Ray Manzarek & Robby Krieger ( dei The Doors )
11 July	J-Ax
12 July	Garbage
13 July	Armin Van Buuren + Jochen Miller
16 July	Nina Zilli
17 July	Lenny Kravitz + Trombone Shorty & Orleans Avenue
18 July	Kasabian
19 July	Elio e Le Storie Tese
20 July	Caparezza
21 July	Boys Noize + guest
22 July	Goran Bregovic
23 July	Ben Harper + Nneka
25 July	Subsonica
26 July	Beach Boys
27 July	Simple Minds
28 July	Litfiba
30 July	Sonata Arctica
2 August	Placebo
22 September	Radiohead + Caribou

=== 2013 ===
29 May	My Bloody Valentine
5 June	Green Day + All Time Low
11 June	The Killers + The Stereophonics
21 June	Toto
25 June	Korn + Bullet for My Valentine + Love and Death
4 July	Iggy Pop and the Stooges
5 July	Max Gazzè
9 July	Rammstein
10 July	Arctic Monkeys + The Vaccines + Miles Kane
11 July	Bruce Springsteen
13 July	Mark Knopfler
14 July	The Smashing Pumpkins + Mark Lanegan Band + Beware of Darkness
16 July	Atoms for Peace
18 July	Ska-P + Casino Royale
22 July	Deep Purple
24 July	Zucchero
25 July	Daniele Silvestri
26 July	Neil Young
28 July	Sigur Rós
29 July	Blur
31 July	Negrita

== See also ==
- List of historic rock festivals
