= En el Jardín del Corazón =

Studio album by Gandhi
- Released: April 4, 1997
- Genre: Rock en Español; Alternative rock

Gandhi chronology
En el Jardín del Corazón (1997)	Páginas Perdidas (1999)

En el Jardín del Corazón is the first album by Gandhi, a Costa Rican music group.

== Track listing ==
1. "Quisieras"
2. "Seca roja reja"
3. "Mátame"
4. "El payaso"
5. "La469"
6. "El invisible"
7. "Descanso"
8. "Mientras tanto"
9. "Solo"
10. "El jardín"
11. "Del corazón"
