= Ciclos (Gandhi album) =

Studio album by Gandhi
- Released: November 12, 2004
- Genre: Rock en Español; alternative rock

Gandhi chronology
BIOS (2002)	Ciclos (2004)

Ciclos (English: Cycles) is the fourth album of the Costa Rican music group Gandhi. Some of its singles are "Señor Caballero", "Ciclos", "Una Ilusion" and "Celeste"

== Track listing ==
1. "Ciclos" (English: Cycles)
2. "Señor Caballero" (English: Mr. Gentleman or Sir Gentleman [Don't confuse with Mr. Horseman])
3. "Celeste" (English: Light Blue)
4. "Sombras" (English: Shadows)
5. "Puente" (English: Bridge)
6. "Vacío" (English: Empty or The empty)
7. "Despierta" (English: (The woman is) Awake, Wake up! or (It) Wakes Up)
8. "Una ilusión" (English: An Ilusion)
9. "40" (English: Forty))
10. "Aire" (English: Air)
11. "El sol y la flor" (English: The sun and the flower)

== "Un Ciclo Más" ==
"Un Ciclo Más" is a DVD by Gandhi based on their last album, "Ciclos". It includes their videos and live performances.
