= Stevie Salas Colorcode =

Studio album by Stevie Salas
- Released: 1990
- Genre: Rock
- Label: Island
- Producer: Bill Laswell, Stevie Salas

Stevie Salas chronology
Stevie Salas Colorcode (1990)	Stuff (1991)

Stevie Salas Colorcode is the debut album by the Native American guitar player Stevie Salas, released in 1990. Colorcode was the name Salas gave to his band.

Salas supported the album by opening for Joe Satriani on a North American tour. The album was a commercial disappointment in the United States, but sold well in international markets. The album's first single was "The Harder They Come".

== Production ==
Recorded in New York, the album was coproduced by Bill Laswell. Colorcode included Winston Watson Jr. on drums and C.J. De Villier on bass. Salas wrote or cowrote all of the album's songs; Parthenon Huxley contributed to some of the lyrics. Salas was at times fretful during the recording sessions, worried because he had quit lucrative sideman jobs.

== Critical reception ==
Professional ratings
Review scores
Source	Rating
AllMusic	4/5 stars
Calgary Herald	C+
Chicago Tribune	2/4 stars
The Encyclopedia of Popular Music	3/5 stars
The Rolling Stone Album Guide	3/5 stars
The State	4/5 stars

The Globe and Mail thought that Salas "sings with an almost audible sneer, and his guitar playing is white hot." The Province determined that Salas "knows how to lock into a groove and doesn't forsake melody for flash—a Hendrix legacy that other modern guitarists overlook." The Buffalo News appreciated that Salas "never once drops his basic allegiance to the underlying funk groove."

The Calgary Herald lamented that the "songs do nothing more than showcase [the] young guitarist." The Chicago Tribune concluded: "Caught in the limboland between glam rock and Journey-inspired tunes, Stevie Salas allows a menagerie of his musical influences to shine through." The San Diego Union-Tribune deemed the album "a flashy, brash debut, full of talent and youthful exuberance."

AllMusic wrote that "'Indian Chief', a touching, Hendrix-inspired ode to Salas' father, is an understated highlight." The Rolling Stone Album Guide opined that Salas's guitar playing moves "beyond the usual funk-and-metal clichés."

== Track listing ==
No.	Title	Length
1.	"Stand Up!"
2.	"Blind"
3.	"Caught in the Middle of It"
4.	"Just Like That"
5.	"Two Bullets and a Gun"
6.	"The Harder They Come"
7.	"Over and Over Again"
8.	"Baby Walk On"
9.	"Indian Chief"
10.	"Cover Me"
