= Brad Brooks =

American singer and songwriter (born 1961)

- Born: Brad Brooks; March 3, 1961 (age 65); Stillwater, Oklahoma
- Genres: Rock; indie rock; Americana; pop rock
- Occupations: Singer, songwriter, musician
- Instruments: Vocals; guitar; keyboards; harmonica
- Years active: 1980–present
- Label: earMusic
- Website: bradbrooksmusic.com

Brad Brooks (born March 3, 1961) is an American singer and songwriter from Oakland, California. He is best known as the last lead singer of the band the MC5. Along with Wayne Kramer, Brooks was a co-writer of the final MC5 record Heavy Lifting, which was produced by Bob Ezrin on earMusic. Heavy Lifting features Tom Morello, Abe Laboriel Jr., Stevie Salas, Vicki Randle, Winston Watson, Dennis Thompson, Don Was, Vernon Reid, Slash, William DuVall, and Joe Berry with songwriting contributions by Tim McIlrath and Jill Sobule. Brooks is also known for his solo work and for singing on the Karaoke Revolution and the Guitar Hero video game series.

== Early life ==
Brad Brooks was born in Stillwater, Oklahoma and grew up in Tucson, Arizona.

== Career ==
In the mid to late 80s, Brooks played in several Tucson based bands. He first found success with the funk rock band Pollo Elastico, who performed with bands such as Faith No More. After Pollo Elastico broke up, Brooks moved to San Francisco where he would form and record with popular bands such as Reckonball and Dolorosa (which included members of 4 Non Blondes and My Life with the Thrill Kill Kult). Dolorosa also recorded a yet to be released album that was financed by Linda Perry.

In 2000, Brooks recorded his first solo album, Sanctified into Astroglide. Between 2003 and 2007, Brooks contributed vocals to Karaoke Revolution 1, Karaoke Revolution 2, Karaoke Revolution 3, Karaoke Revolution Party, Karaoke Presents American Idol Encore 2, Guitar Hero II, and Guitar Hero Rocks The 80s. In 2007, Brooks released the power pop album, Spill Collateral Love. His third solo album, Harmony of Passing Light, was released in 2012, this one leaning more in the Americana genre.

In 2015, while preparing to record his next album, Brooks was diagnosed with throat cancer. After surgery, radiation treatment, and five years of recovery, Brooks was finally able to release God Save the City in 2020 to critical acclaim.

=== MC5 ===
In 2019, Brooks was asked by writer Tiffanie DeBartolo (who co-founded Bright Antenna Records) to perform at a tribute to Jeff Buckley at Sweetwater Saloon in Mill Valley. It was at the tribute that Brooks was invited to sing with Wayne Kramer. Their conversation that night led to what would become a long distance friendship and "cancer brotherhood", and later on a songwriting partnership between Kramer and Brooks. The results of this collaboration would supply the material for the final MC5 album, Heavy Lifting.

In the spring of 2022, a new version of the MC5 with Brooks on lead vocals went on tour with guitarist Wayne Kramer, guitarist Stevie Salas, bassist Vicki Randle, and drummer Winston Watson. The tour was titled We Are All MC5.

The album Heavy Lifting was produced by rock legend Bob Ezrin and engineered by Dave Way. Along with Kramer and Brooks, the core group of musicians on the album were Salas, Randall, Watson, Abe Laboriel Jr., and Don Was. Heavy Lifting also featured guest performances by Slash, Tom Morello, Vernon Reid, William DuVall, and Dennis Thompson. The album was released on October 18, 2024, sadly eight months after Wayne Kramer's death from pancreatic cancer. It was the first release by the MC5 since 1971.

On December 5, 2024, Brooks performed at a tribute concert for Wayne Kramer at The Roxy in Los Angeles that also featured Morello, Chuck D, RZA, Ben Harper, and Steven Van Zandt.

== Discography ==
=== Solo discography ===
- Sanctified into Astroglide (2000)
- Spill Collateral Love (2007)
- Harmony of Passing Light (2012)
- God Save the City (2020)

=== MC5 discography ===
- Heavy Lifting (2024)
