= Insomnio (Sol D'Menta album) =

Studio album by Sol D'Menta
- Released: July 13, 2001
- Recorded: 2000 at Los Angeles, California at NRG and A&M Studios Atlanta, Georgia
- Genre: Rock en español
- Length: 50:07
- Label: Radical Sonica
- Producer: John Avila

Sol D'Menta chronology
Tocando Madera (2000)	Insomnio (2001)	Vivos (2002)

Alternative cover
- Alternative cover

Insomnio is the fourth album of the Puerto Rican rock band Sol D'Menta and their third studio album. It is also the first album to feature new singer Omar Hernández. The album was released on July 13, 2001.

The album includes a cover of the popular salsa song "Calle Luna, Calle Sol" originally sung by Héctor Lavoe and Willie Colón.

== Track listing ==
1. "Canción de una canción"
2. "Insomnio"
3. "Lánzate"
4. "Locomotora"
5. "Sentido Contrario"
6. "El Principio"
7. "Un Par de Latidos"
8. "Voices in My Head"
9. "Calle Luna, Calle Sol"
10. "El Velo de La Verdad"
11. "Rebeldia"
12. "Funkadelicpsycomenta"

== Musicians ==
=== Band members ===
- Omar Hernández – vocals
- Erick "Jey" Seda – bass
- Miguel "Tito" Rodríguez – guitar
- Ernesto "Che" Rodríguez – drums

=== Guest musicians ===
- John Avila – bass solo on "Canción de una Canción", keyboards, vocals
- John Ewing Jr. – loops and samples
- Sam "Hammond" Avila – hammond organ
- Daniel Hall – DJ effects
- Draco rosa- calle luna calle sol

== Personnel ==
- Produced by John Avila
- Co-produced by John Ewing Jr.
- Recorded and mixed at Brando's Paradise Studios, San Gabriel, California
- Recording Engineer – John Ewing Jr.
- Additional Recording – John Avila
- Digital Engineering – John Ewing Jr. and John Avila
- Mixed by John Ewing Jr. except "Canción de una canción", "El velo de la Verdad" and "Lánzate" mixed by John Avila
- Mastered at Precision Mastering, Los Angeles, California
- Mastering Engineer – Tom Baker
