= Pierrot (Aya Kamiki song) =

"ピエロ" "Pierrot" / "Clown"
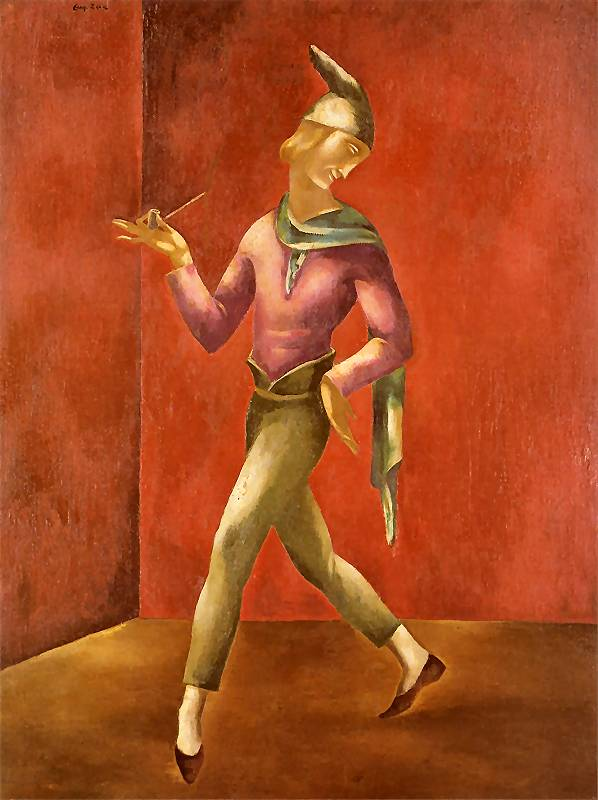

Single by Aya Kamiki

from the album Secret Code
- Released: April 12, 2006
- Recorded: 2006
- Genre: J-Pop, rock
- Length: 10:13
- Label: GIZA studio GZCA-7070 (Japan, CD)
- Songwriter(s): Koshi Inaba, Tak Matsumoto (Pierrot); Aya Kamiki (Sakura e)
- Producer(s): KANONJI

Aya Kamiki singles chronology
"Communication Break" (2006)	"ピエロ" "Pierrot" / "Clown" (2006)	"Mō Kimi Dake o Hanashitari wa Shinai" (2006)

"Pierrot" (ピエロ, Piero) is a Japanese-language song by Aya Kamiki, written by Koshi Inaba, Tak Matsumoto and was Kimiki's second single, released on April 12, 2006. The song is no relation to the 1983 song of the same name by Toshihiko Tahara, and begins with the lyrics "Momoiro ni somari yuku..".

"Pierrot" was used as the theme song for the film Hokuto no Ken - Raō Den - Jun'ai no Shō. The main track is a cover version of a B'z song released as the coupling track of their single "Yuruginai Mono Hitotsu", which was released on the same day as Kamiki's single. This single debuted at #9 on the Oricon Weekly Singles Chart and sold 38,127 copies in total. This is currently her second best selling single.

== Track list ==
=== CD ===
1. Pierrot (ピエロ, Clown)
2. Sakura e (桜絵)
3. Pierrot (ピエロ) (instrumental)

== Sales ==
Initial week estimate: 9,774
Total estimate: 38,127
