= Tocando Madera =

Live album by Sol D'Menta
- Released: April 25, 2000
- Recorded: September 2, 1999, at Hard Rock Cafe in San Juan, Puerto Rico
- Genre: Rock en español
- Length: 60:16
- Label: Sonolux
- Producer: Sol D'Menta

Sol D'Menta chronology
¿El Concepto? (1998)	Tocando Madera (2000)	Insomnio (2001)

Tocando Madera is the third album of the Puerto Rican rock band Sol D'Menta. It is their first live album, and it was recorded September 2, 1999, during a presentation of the band at the Hard Rock Cafe in San Juan, Puerto Rico. The album was released by on April 25, 2000.

== Track listing ==
1. "Hay que pensar" – 5:01
2. "La Calle" – 2:45
3. "La Rumba" – 3:45
4. "Cachetera" – 4:45
5. "El Arte de Olvidar" – 5:45
6. "Perro Callejero" – 6:45
7. "Rosa" – 7:45
8. "Sentido Contrario" – 8:45
9. "Skalamientos" – 9:45
10. "Funkadelicpsycomenta" – 10:45
11. "Cerro Maravilla" – 11:45
12. "Oubao Moin" (Roy Brown, Juan Antonio Corretjer) – 12:45
13. "Inconforme" – 13:45

== Musicians ==
=== Band members ===
- Omar Hernández – vocals
- Erick "Jey" Seda – bass
- Miguel "Tito" Rodríguez – guitar
- Ernesto "Che" Rodríguez – drums

== Personnel ==
- Mixed at Sound Junkie Recording, Cupey, Puerto Rico
- Recording and mix Engineer – Leo Alvarez
- Live Sound Engineer – Eddie Román
- Mastered at Kitchen Mastering Studio, North Carolina
- Mastering Engineer – Brend Lambert
- Live Production Assistant – Héctor Luis Blancovitch
