= ¿El Concepto? =

Studio album by Sol D'Menta
- Released: June 16, 1998
- Recorded: November 1997 at NRG Studios in Hollywood, California
- Genre: Rock en español
- Length: 32:40
- Label: Polygram

Sol D'Menta chronology
Sol D'Menta (1996)	¿El Concepto? (1998)	Tocando Madera (2000)

¿El Concepto? is the second album of the Puerto Rican rock band Sol D'Menta. The album was released by Polygram on June 16, 1998.

The song "Cerro Maravilla" is about the incidents that happened at the mountain of the same name in Puerto Rico (see Cerro Maravilla Incident).

== Track listing ==
No.	Title	Length
1.	"¿El Concepto?"	2:48
2.	"Hay que pensar"	3:52
3.	"La Calle"	2:34
4.	"Padre"	4:42
5.	"No Voy en Tren (voy en Avión)"	3:18
6.	"Buriaco"	2:43
7.	"Perro Callejero"	2:15
8.	"El Arte de Olvidar"	3:19
9.	"El Roble y la Gaviota"	2:48
10.	"4 Vías"	2:23
11.	"Cerro Maravilla"	2:57

== Musicians ==
=== Band members ===
- Ricky Díaz – vocals
- Erick "Jey" Seda – bass
- Miguel "Tito" Rodríguez – guitar
- Ernesto "Che" Rodríguez – drums

=== Guest musicians ===
- Keefus Cianca – keyboards
- Davy Chegwidden – percussion and "weird sounds"
- Geof Gaellegos – baritone saxophone and "weird sounds"
- Tracy Wannomae – saxophone
- Matt Demerritt – tenor saxophone
- Todd M. Simon – trumpet and flugelhorn
- Dan Ostermann – trombone
- John Avila – upright bass
- Brandon – barks
- Bobbie Chapman – organ
- Dennis Nieves – backing vocals
- Luis Pérez – backing vocals

== Personnel ==
- Recorded November 1997 at NRG Studios in Hollywood, California, except Track 5 recorded at ALFA Recording Studios in 1998.
- John Ewing Jr. – Recording and Mix Engineer
- Michael Baskette – Recording and Mix Assistant
- Lisa Lewis – Mix Assistant
- Additional Recording at Brando's Paradise, San Gabriel, California
- John Avila – Additional Recording Engineer
- Mastered by Renato Pinto Visom, Fort Lauderdale, Florida
