= Mō Kimi Dake o Hanashitari wa Shinai =

"もう君だけを離したりはしない "Mō Kimi Dake o Hanashitari wa Shinai""

Single by Aya Kamiki

from the album Secret Code
- Released: May 31, 2006
- Recorded: 2006
- Genre: J-Pop, rock
- Length: 12:15
- Label: GIZA studio GZCA-7073 (Japan, CD)
- Songwriter(s): Aya Kamiki (lyrics), Munetaka Kawamoto (compositions)
- Producer(s): KANONJI

Aya Kamiki singles chronology
"Pierrot" (2006)	"もう君だけを離したりはしない "Mō Kimi Dake o Hanashitari wa Shinai"" (2006)	"Nemutteita Kimochi Nemutteita Kokoro" (2006)

"Mō Kimi Dake o Hanashitari wa Shinai" is Aya Kamiki's third single. The main track were used as the Detective Conan ending theme for episodes 438–458. This single debuted at #11 on the Oricon Weekly Singles Chart and sold 21,967 copies in total.

== Track list ==
=== CD ===
1. Mō Kimi Dake o Hanashitari wa Shinai (もう君だけを離したりはしない)
2. Kizu Darake Demo Dakishimete (傷だらけでも抱きしめて)
3. Mō Kimi Dake o Hanashitari wa Shinai (もう君だけを離したりはしない) (instrumental)

== Sales ==
Initial week estimate: 11,521
Total estimate: 21,967
