= El Café Chorale =

El Café Chorale is choral ensemble based in Costa Rica. It was founded in 1994 by the Costa Rican Choral Institute. It performs a wide variety of musical genres, including Renaissance and Latin American Folk. The choir has participated in multiple international choral competitions.

The choir received the Costa Rican National Prize of Music, the highest honor in the Arts in Costa Rica, in 1999, 2003, and 2007.

In the year 2000, El Café Chorale participated in the Western Division Convention hosted by the American Choral Directors Association, where the choir presented multiple vocal workshops.

== Choral competition results ==
| Year | Competition | Location | Award/placement | Genre performed |
|---|---|---|---|---|
| 1998 | Förderkreis Internationale Chortage | Mainhausen, Germany | Second | Renaissance, Romantic, and Contemporary |
| 1999 | Harmonie Festival | Germany | Gold medal, first | Folk accompanied |
| 1999 | Harmonie Festival | Germany | Gold medal, second | Folk a capella |
| 2001 | Festival Choral International | Neuchâtel, Switzerland | Finalist | |
| 2003 | Förderkreis Internationale Chortage | Mainhausen, Germany | Gold medal, first | Renaissance, Romantic, and Contemporary |
| 2005 | Harmonie Festival | Germany | Gold medal, first | Folk a capella |
| 2007 | Internationalen Chorfestival | Ruhr, Germany | Unknown | A capella |
| 2011 | Harmonie Festival | Germany | Silver medal, third | Folk a capella |
| 2011 | Harmonie Festival | Germany | Bronze medal, first | Folk accompanied |
| 2011 | Langenselbolder Chorfestival | Germany | First | Sacred music |
| 2011 | Internationale Chortage | Mainhausen, Germany | Third | Men's choir |

== See also ==
- Music of Costa Rica
