= Federico Miranda =

Costa Rican musician (born 1976)

- Federico playing with Gandhi in Jazz Café, Costa Rica.

Background information
- Born: Federico Miranda; January 20, 1976 (age 50); San José, Costa Rica
- Origin: San José, Costa Rica
- Genres: Alternative rock
- Occupation: Guitarist
- Instrument: Electric guitar
- Years active: 1993 - Present
- Website: http://www.federicomiranda.com http://www.grupogandhi.com

Federico Miranda (born January 20, 1976, in San Jose, Costa Rica) is the guitarist for the Costa Rican music group Gandhi.

== Early life ==
When growing up, the young Miranda was always surrounded by music, his sister played the organ and his uncles played guitar. When he was 9 years old, he wanted to play violin, but when he turned 12, he got his first electric guitar and started reading books and magazines due to the lack of a teacher; two years later, he started his first band. Several years later, he became interested in jazz and other genres, which led him to many different teachers. He then went to Berklee College of Music, where his interest towards jazz, flamenco, Celtic, and Latin music grew even more. Miranda is also a graduate of Electrical Engineering. He has acknowledged the influence of many guitarists including Joe Satriani and Eddie Van Halen.

== Gandhi ==
Federico met Luis Montalbert-Smith and Abel Guier in highschool, while Massimo Hernández was met through a friend of Federico's sister. The band started only with Federico and Luis, they played together in a highschool contest and won 2nd place. Abel and Massimo joined the band afterwards and began doing mostly covers and a couple of original songs. They gave their first concert in a bar in San Jose in 1993. Of Gandhi's musicians, Federico is the most acquainted with harmony and theory, he writes most of their musical arrangements.

== Solo work ==
Federico also performs often with his instrumental jazz-fusion group, Baula Project, whose debut album was released in June 2005. In May 2008 Miranda participated with Baula Project's music in the Guitar Idol online contest and got a score of 837 points even though he entered late and only participated for one week.
