= The Great Wilderness =

Costa Rican band

- Origin: San Jose, Costa Rica
- Genres: Post punk, shoegaze, dream pop
- Years active: 2009–present
- Members: Paola Rogue; Jimena Torres; Monserrat Vargas
- Past members: Andrea San Gil; Marco Gölcher; Alexandro Baviera; Diego Trika
- Website: Official website Bandcamp

The Great Wilderness (TGW) is a dream rock band from Costa Rica, influenced by British post punk and alternative rock.

The group has toured Europe visiting cities like Berlin (playing at Lido), London (The Old Blue Last, The Dublin Castle), Manchester (Night & Day Cafe) and Paris (Le Motel). Sharing the stage with acts like Ghxst, Portugal. The Man and La Pegatina.

The band has been featured in publications like The NME Magazine, Noiseloop, Filter Magazine and Cuchara Sonica, where it was chosen as the best new underground band of 2010.

On January 31, 2012, they were announced as part of the bill for the Festival Imperial alongside artists like Björk, Manchester Orchestra and The Flaming Lips. They showcased at SXSW 2012 and 2014. In 2013 they played during Canadian Music Week and Filter Music's Culture Collide Festival in Los Angeles.

In 2013 the released their third production, a 10-song LP titled In the Hour of the Wolf which was promoted during their second visit to SXSW in 2014. After several shows during that year they announced a hiatus, which lasted till late 2017 when they suddenly returned to the stage, now with Monserrat Vargas back in their lineup.

== Biography ==
The initial lineup was formed in 2009 when Paola Rogue (vox, guitar) and Andrea San Gil (drums) decided to carry on after the split of their previous act, Lolita Piñata. They were soon joined by Monserrat Vargas (bass), who had played with Paola in previous projects years back.

After spending the first part of the year practicing and crafting songs, they started playing in several local venues such as El Cuartel, Latino Rock and El CENAC.

The group was joined by Jimena Torres as a second guitar in 2010. They released their first EP titled Afterimages of Glowing Visions, a semi-conceptual work based on a post-apocalyptic dream that leads to the discovering of one's inner world.

In November 2010, they revealed their second EP, Tiny Monsters, to the public. It is a 6-song album focused on topics such as claustrophobia, determinism and obsessiveness. After this release, the band has been featured in publications like The NME Magazine, Noiseloop and Cuchara Sonica, where it was chosen as the best new underground band of 2010.

The band released a double single on April 15. The song is called “Dark Horse” (parts 1 and 2) and it was also accompanied by a live video recorded by the production company Sürrealista at a show that took place in El Lobo Estepario. The single was available for download at their Bandcamp page.

In September 2011 they embarked on their first European tour, which took them to countries such as France, Germany and the UK. During this tour they played along bands like Ghxst (USA), Portugal. The Man (USA) and La Pegatina (Spain), among others.

Soon alter returning to Costa Rica, they participated in the compilation Sí San José, a project conceived by the North American producer Vito Petruzzelli (in collaboration with Daniel Ortuño and Adrian Poveda) which featured 9 bands of the Costa Rican indie scene. The compilation received acclaim both nationally and internationally. After completing the recording process for this project, Andrea San Gil left the band and was replaced by Alexandro Baviera, known for his work with bands like A Cry for Marie and Alphabetics.

In December 2011, "Dark Horse" won the award for best song of 2011 given by renowned members of the Costa Rican press through the digital magazine 89decibeles. On that same month, they received an invitation to participate in North American festival SXSW, which took place during the month of March 2012. They showcased with bands like Cymbals Eat Guitars, A Classic Education and Ganglians.

Their return home saw them play at the Imperial Festival along artists like Björk, The Flaming Lips, Cage the Elephant, Manchester Orchestra and TV on the Radio among many others. The reviews of their performance were positive and the band started to gain a bigger following in Costa Rica. Sadly, they had to face the loss of founder and bassist, Monserrat Vargas, who decided to quit the band due to personal conflicts and her desire to focus on her other project, Las Robertas.

The band quickly got back on their feet with substitute bassist, Gustavo Quiros, who helped them get through previous commitments and the recording of their first LP, In the Hour of the Wolf. This album was created with the help of Ronald Bustamante, Daniel Ortuño and Giancarlo Tassara of Miüt Audio, San Jose. The tracks revolve around the theme of loss and recovery with a much heavier sound and an inclination towards bass and drum dynamics.

With the album was still in process, they travelled to Toronto to play during Canadian Music Week 2013, where they shared the stage with groups like Revolvers, Funeral Suits and A Place to Bury Strangers, Austra and an event organised by Filter Magazine as part of their Culture Collide initiative, to which they were invited in 2013 to play in several showcases.

In late 2013 they released In the Hour of the Wolf, their first LP; which was promoted during their second visit to SXSW. After that last show, they announced a hiatus which lasted until late 2017 when they suddenly returned to the stages with new music in hand.

== Influences ==
They have been inspired by British pop and US alternative rock bands like The Smashing Pumpkins. Female singers that influenced them are Shirley Manson, Brody Dalle, Courtney Love, Melissa Auf der Maur, Kim Gordon and Siouxsie from Siouxsie and the Banshees.

== Discography ==
- Afterimages of Glowing Visions (Jun 2010)
- Tiny Monsters (Nov 2010)
- Dark Horse (Single) (Apr 2011)
- In the Hour of the Wolf (Nov 2013)

== Videography ==
- On Smoke (September 2010, Cazadora Producciones)
- Nicolas Cage & Kiddy Plane (September 2010, Cazadora Producciones)
- Dark Horse (March 2011, Sürrealista)
