= Luis Montalbert-Smith =

- Luis playing with Gandhi in Jazz Café, Costa Rica.

Background information
- Birth name: Luis Montalbert-Smith
- Born: 22 May 1975 (age 49); Washington, DC, US
- Origin: San José, Costa Rica
- Genres: Alternative rock
- Occupation: Singer/songwriter
- Instrument(s): Vocals, piano
- Years active: 1993–present
- Website: http://www.grupogandhi.com

Luis Montalbert-Smith Echeverría (22 May 1975) is a Costa Rican American-born musician. Is the lead singer and co-founder of the Costa Rican rock music group Gandhi.

== Early life ==
Luis Montalbert-Smith was born on 22 May 1975 in Washington DC, to a Costa Rican surgeon and a physiologist who were studying at Georgetown University at the time. He lived his first years in Washington, D.C. and moved to his parents hometown in Costa Rica in 1979. His first artistic expression, her mom remarks, was dancing at the young age of one while listening to Anita Wards' hit Ring my Bell.

During a visit to his grandmother's for tea at the age of 5(his grandparents were of English descent), she played the piano. The moment was so shocking to him that he instantly told his mother "I want to do what Grandma Molly is doing". His parents right away put him in piano lessons with a local neighborhood teacher, which prepared Luis to audition for the Children's Program at the University of Costa Rica's School for Musical Arts. To support him, his Grandma Molly gave Luis an old Köhl piano she had, as a motivating factor for his studies. In 1981 he presented the audition and was admitted to the Basic Stage Program and assigned to Professor Sara Mintz.

When he was 8 years old, he watched a Michael Jackson concert on the TV and decided he wanted also to sing. His mom put him in the Children Chorus at the University of Costa Rica, where he was already studying piano. He studied until 1990, when he was forced to quit the musical program in order to improve his high school studies.

== His beginnings with Gandhi ==
Montalbert-Smith began to create his own band at the age of 13, while attending Saint Francis College -HighSchool- in San Jose, C.R. As part of the teenage natural search for identity, he rebelled from his classical music education and started experimenting with other musical styles. His search stopped when he first listened to the Guns N' Roses album Appetite for Destruction.

In 1988–89 he formed his first group called The Hypers, who played classic rock from the 60s and 70s. As a curious detail, Luis was the drummer. The group dissolves when Luis left to participate in a dance contest at school. In 1990 he formed his second band with a couple of friends, including Erick Hernandez (now part of the 1/2Docena comedy group).

In 1991 he met guitarist Federico Miranda, also enrolled at St. Francis High School. Miranda proposed to Montalbert to form a band to participate in the High School Talent Show. By that time Miranda was also known for being a great guitar player and Montalbert-Smith accepted the proposal. They participated with 2 songs and won first and second place at the contest.

Gandhi was formally established in 1992 with Federico Miranda on the guitar, Luis Montalbert-Smith as lead vocalist, Bernardo Trejos (later co-founder of El Parque) at the bass guitar and Mario Carvajal on drums. They named it Gandhi since they liked the sound of the name and liked the positive association it created with Mohandas K. Gandhi.

In 1993, when Montalbert-Smith had already graduated from High School and a regular student at the University of Costa Rica, Carvajal left the group and by Miranda's sister intermediation they were introduced to Massimo Hernandez, who finally came to play drums for the band. At the same time, Trejos was replaced with Bruno Porter's bass guitar player Mauricio Pauly.

The band played covers of famous hits such as Red Hot Chili Peppers, Alice in Chains, Queen, etc. They debuted in mid-1993 at a bar in downtown San Jose call Cus when opening for a local band called Signos Vitales (with Luis Arenas on vocals, who later was the singer for Costa Rican Group El Parque).

In 1994 they entered the Yamaha Music Quest and participated with the original song El Jardin del Corazon. They did not win but the contest gave them exposure and opened opportunities.

In 1995 they had their first major experience when opening for the Guatemalan group Alux Nahual. In 1996, M. Pauly left the group and Abel Guier entered Gandhi to consolidate the current band structure. Abel was the bass guitar player for Viuda Negra, a famous underground metal group in San Jose at that time.
