= Baula Project =

Studio album by Federico Miranda
- Released: 2005
- Genre: Jazz-Fusion
- Length: 52:44

Baula Project is an album by Federico Miranda created in 2005. Its objective is to raise public awareness on Baula turtles situation in Costa Rica and the degradation of the environment in general.

== Track listing ==
| No. | Title | Length |
|---|---|---|
| 1. | "Subir al Sol" | 2:01 |
| 2. | "Sobre el Agua" | 6:01 |
| 3. | "Escape" | 4:40 |
| 4. | "Noreste" | 3:52 |
| 5. | "Regresión" | 4:40 |
| 6. | "Mejor No" | 3:28 |
| 7. | "Caminos de Tierra" | 6:09 |
| 8. | "El Nómada" | 4:38 |
| 9. | "Primer Dia" | 3:00 |
| 10. | "En Transito" | 6:23 |
| 11. | "En Aranjuez Con Tu Amor" (Based on the "Concierto de Aranjuez para Guitarra") | 7:52 |
