= Ciclos (Sol D'Menta album) =

Studio album by Sol D'Menta
- Released: August 29, 2006
- Recorded: 2005 At Houston, Texas And San Juan, Puerto Rico
- Genre: Rock en español
- Length: 46:31
- Producer: Miguel "Tito" Rodríguez

Sol D'Menta chronology
Vivos (2002)	Ciclos (2006)

Ciclos is the sixth album of the Puerto Rican rock band Sol D'Menta and their fourth studio album. It was released on August 29, 2006.

The album includes a cover of Bob Marley's song "Could You Be Loved".

== Track listing ==
1. "Ciclos"
2. "Castigos y Recompensas"
3. "Desde Que No Estas"
4. "De Vuelta en Ocean Park"
5. "Indigo"
6. "Del Campo en la Ciudad"
7. "Could You Be Loved"
8. "Should Be One"
9. "Cuarta Dimensión"
10. "Fantasma"
11. "Muy Tarde Ya"
12. "Could You Be Loved (Rock)"

== Personnel ==
=== Band members ===
- Omar Hernández – vocals
- Erick "Jey" Seda – bass
- Miguel "Tito" Rodríguez – guitar
- Ernesto "Che" Rodríguez – drums

=== Technical members ===
- Recorded and Produced by Miguel "Tito" Rodríguez at T&C Recording Studio, Mayaguez, Puerto Rico
- Mixed by Bob St. John at PDQ Studio, Hollywood, Florida
- Mastered by George Marino at Sterling Sound, New York City
- Executive Producer – Albert Morales
- Co-executive producers – John "MetalKid" Rodríguez & Erick Seda
