= Brunca (Bithynia) =

Town of ancient Bithynia

Coordinates: 40°46′40″N 29°42′04″E

Brunca or Brunka or Brunga was a town of ancient Bithynia on the coast of the Propontis, on the road from Nicomedia to Libyssa, 13 M.P. from the former and 12 M.P. of the latter.

Its site is tentatively located near Hereke/Yarımca, in Asiatic Turkey.
