= Sol D'Menta =

Spanish-language rock band from Mayagüez, Puerto Rico

- Origin: Mayaguez, Puerto Rico
- Genres: Rock en Español
- Years active: 1994–present
- Label: Los Soles / AlteRock Music
- Members: Erick "Jey" Seda; Miguel "Tito" Rodríguez; Ernesto "Che" Rodríguez; Ricardo "Ricky" Díaz
- Past members: Omar Hernández, Javier 'D'Jeleu' Pérez

Sol D' Menta is a rock en español band from Mayaguez, Puerto Rico. The band was formed in 1994 and became one of the most successful bands in the island. They became the first Puerto Rican band to be signed by a multinational label (Polygram) with whom they released their first eponymous album in 1996.

== Biography ==
Sol D'Menta was formed in 1994 by Erick Seda (bass), Miguel Rodríguez (guitar), Ernesto Rodríguez (drums), and Ricky Díaz (vocals), all from the city of Mayagüez, Puerto Rico. After some time playing in the local scene, the band was signed by Polygram becoming the first Puerto Rican rock band to be signed by a multinational label. Under Polygram, the band released their self-titled debut album achieving great success with singles like "Inconformes" and "La Cachetera".

Although the lyrics of the album were mostly light and party-oriented, some of them had social messages about the situation in the island. One example is the song "Skalamientos", which chronicles the continuous rise in crime in Puerto Rico. Other songs addressed subjects like materialism, alcoholism, and homelessness.

In 1997 the band went to work in their follow-up album that was recorded at NRG Studios in Hollywood, California. The result was the album titled ¿El Concepto? released on June 16, 1998. It included a version of the song "No voy en Tren" from Argentinean singer Charly García. In 1998, during the promotion for the album, Ricky left the band after some differences with guitarist Tito Rodríguez. Also, the band was dropped from Polygram.

For their third album, Tocando Madera, the group set up their own production company, recording an acoustic album live at the Hard Rock Cafe in San Juan. The album featured three original songs plus hits from their prior two albums, and received two nominations at the Tu Música Awards for Best Rock Group and Album of the Year.

However, singer Ricky Díaz left the band. He was replaced by Omar Hernández. In 2001 the band released their third studio album titled Insomnio featuring fusions with hip hop, jazz, and other rhythms. The album featured a cover of Héctor Lavoe and Willie Colón salsa hit "Calle Luna, Calle Sol". The song became an instant hit.

On May 24, 2002, the band presented a concert at the Tito Puente Amphitheatre. The concert was recorded and released as their second live album titled Vivos. In 2006 they released their latest studio album titled Ciclos.

In 2021, Sol d'Menta released a new single "Patriota", returning to the radio charts in the Island. In the summer of 2022, the band released a new EP, Acustico EP, the first with the original line up in 25 years.

The musical style of the band is a fusion of hard-rock and many other musical styles, such as salsa, funk, ska and hip-hop. The style is sometimes referred to as "Funkadelicpsycomenta"; this is a reference to the title of a hit song that appeared first on Tocando Madera.

== Band members ==
=== Current members ===
- Ricardo "Ricky" Díaz - lead vocals
- Erick "Jey" Seda Santana - bass guitar
- Miguel "Tito" Rodríguez - guitar
- Ernesto José "Che" Rodríguez Soto - drums

=== Former members ===
- Omar Abnel Hernández González - lead vocals, * Javier 'Djeleu' Pérez - guitar

== Discography ==
- Sol D'Menta (1996)
- ¿El Concepto? (1998)
- Tocando Madera (2000)
- Insomnio (2001)
- Vivos (2002)
- Ciclos (2006)
- Ciclos Special Edition (2007)
- Acustico (2022)

== See also ==
- Puerto Rican rock
