= Brunca Sign Language =

Deaf sign language of Costa Rica

- Native to: Costa Rica
- Ethnicity: Boruca
- Native speakers
- Language family: village sign

Language codes
- ISO 639-3: rnb
- Glottolog: brun1247
- ELP: Brunca Sign Language

Brunca Sign Language is a village sign language of an indigenous Brunca community in southern Costa Rica. It is unrelated to Costa Rican Sign Language.
