= Danza de los Diablitos =

Festival in Costa Rica

Danza de los Diablitos (The Dance of the Little Devils) is a three-day annual festival, held December 31 through January 2 by the Boruca people, an indigenous people in Costa Rica. The male participants of the tribe perform a ritual dance re-enacting the Spanish conquest wearing elaborate costumes. The most important part of the costumes are the masks. With the mask, each member is empowered to fight and dispel the evil of the Spanish invaders who are represented by a mock bull. The festival masks use demon features, which the indigenous people adopted symbolically from the Spanish Catholics.

This re-enactment finds the Borucans triumphant over the Spanish. The victory celebrates the identity and existence of the Borucan people against past enemies, as well as current threats to their community and way of life. As the modern world encroaches, indigenous people have struggled to find a balance that retains their spirituality and harmony with nature. Their past and their art demonstrate acknowledgment that they are part of the natural world. Remembering who they are and where they come from serves to reinforce their identity. It will hopefully bring them into the future.

This dance originated almost 500 years ago, when the Indigenous people were trying to scare away conquistadors.

The Borucas sell the hand painted masks for profit, along with many other indigenous crafts.

Traditional Boruca masks

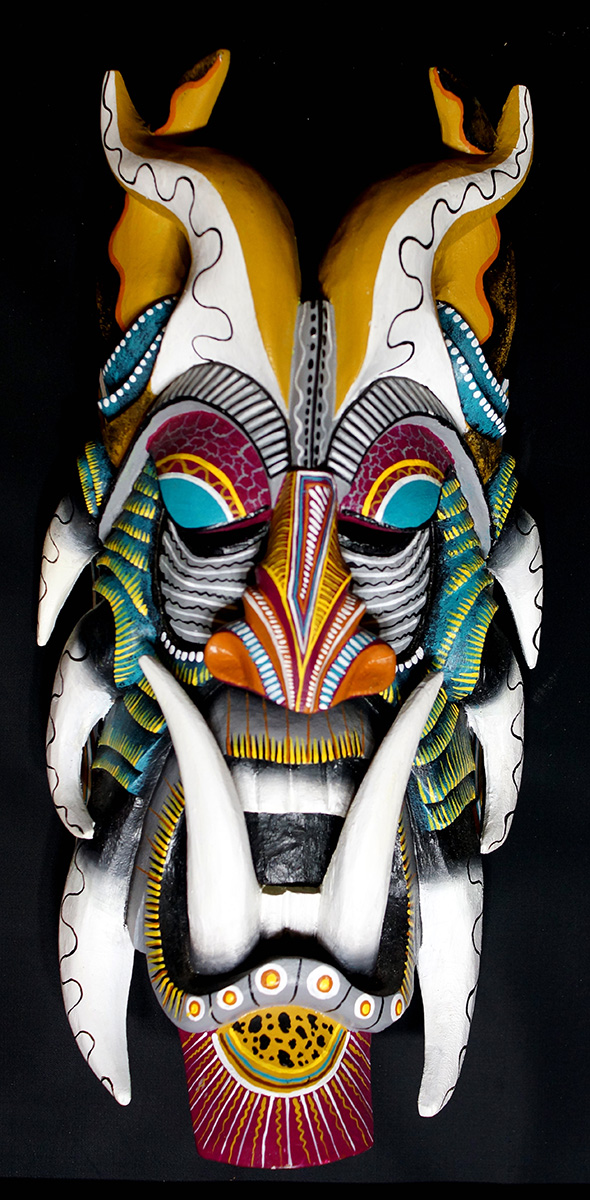

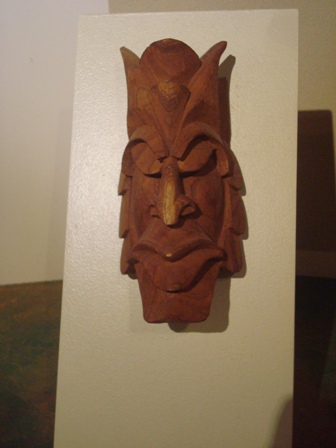

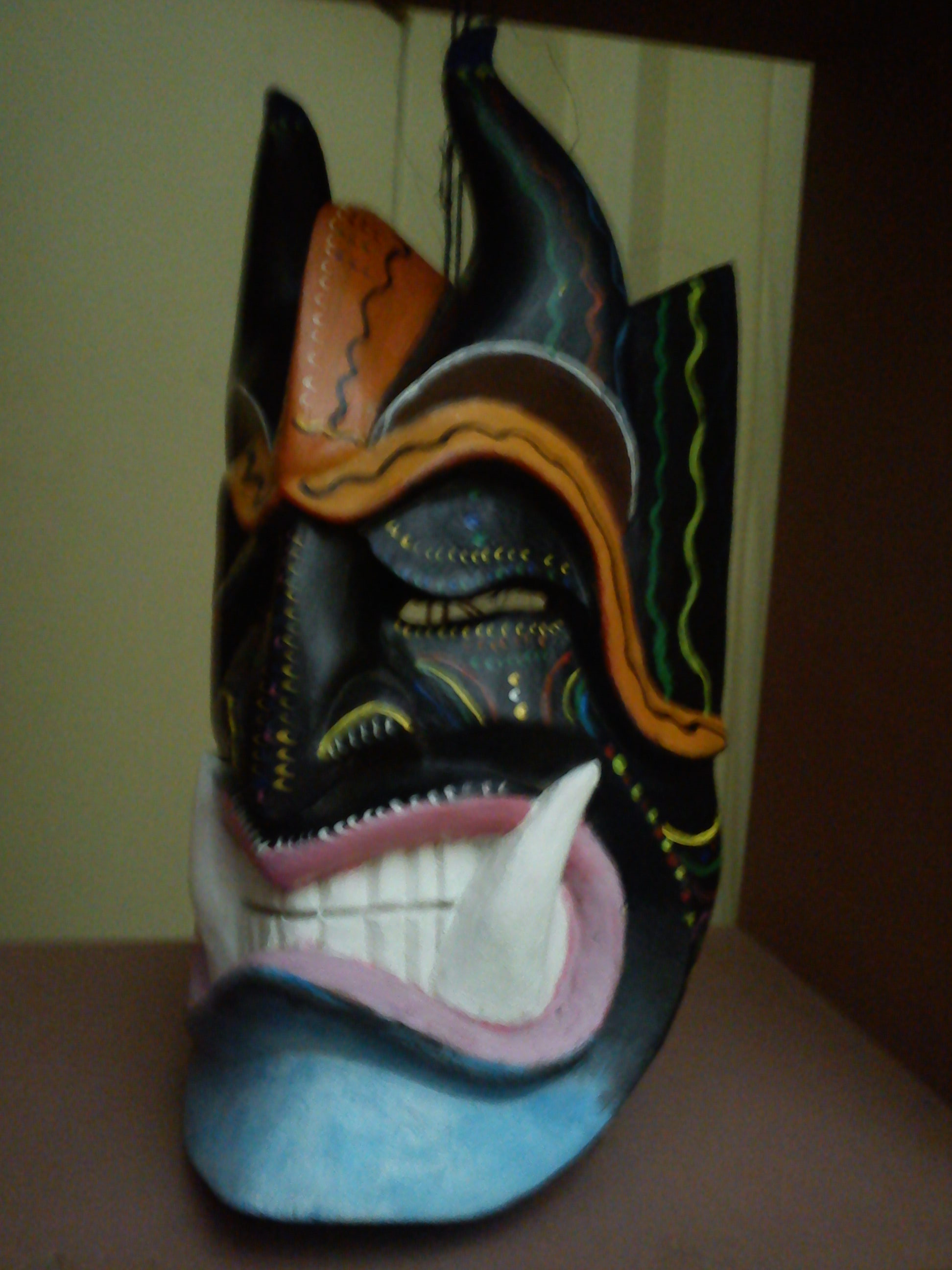

== See also ==
- Boruca
