= Music of Costa Rica =

The country of Costa Rica has many kinds of music.

Music of Costa Rica Topics
Calypso	Rock
Soca	Rumba
Reggaeton	Hip hop
Pop	Cumbia
Merengue	Salsa
Bachata	Classical music
Tex-Mex	Guanacaste
Marimba music	Folklorico
Afro-Caribbean music	Metal
Punk	Ska
Timeline and Samples
Central American music
Belize - Costa Rica - El Salvador - Guatemala - Honduras - Nicaragua - Panama

Though its music has achieved little international credit, Costa Rican popular music genres include an indigenous calypso scene, which is distinct from the more widely known Trinidadian calypso sound, as well as a thriving disco audience that supports nightclubs in cities such as San José. American and British rock and roll and pop are very popular and common among the youth (especially urban youth), while dance-oriented genres including soca, salsa, merengue, cumbia and Tex-Mex have an appeal among a somewhat older audience.

Mexican music is very popular among older people and some people in the countryside. During the middle years of the 20th century, Costa Rica was exposed to much Mexican cultural influence.

Another new genre explored in Costa Rica is Celtic with the group Peregrino Gris.

== Folk music ==
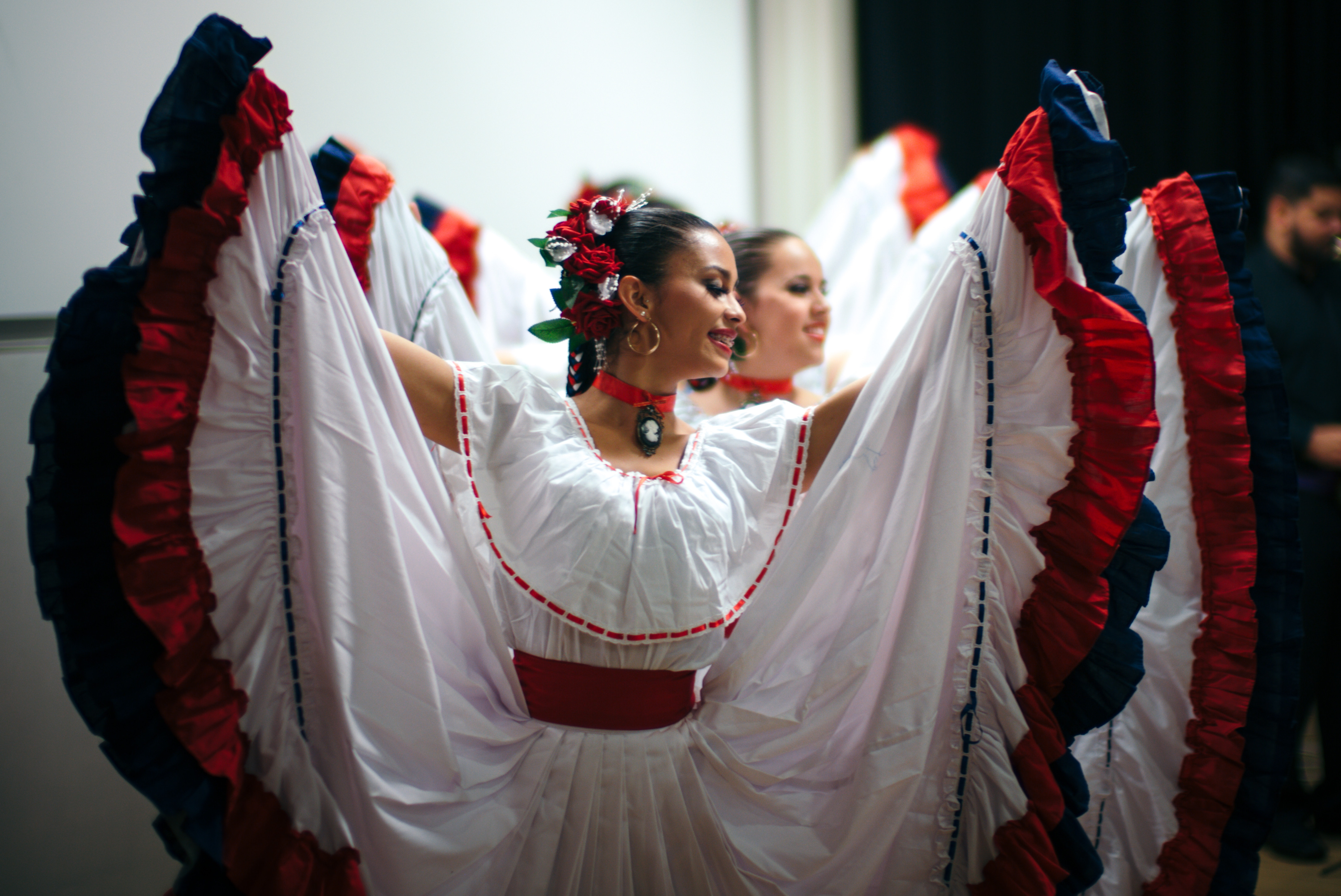
Costa Rican Dance Performance

The Caribbean coast shows a strong African influence in the complex percussion rhythms such as sinkit. Like its northerly neighbors in Central America, the marimba is a very popular instrument, and Costa Rican marimba music is popular. In modern times, groups such as Cantares have helped to popularize Costa Rican folk music, and were a leading part of the New Costa Rican Song movement.

Costa Rica's pre-Columbian population has contributed a large part of the country's folk heritage, include rare musical scales, certain ceremonial songs and ocarinas. The Guanacaste region, in the Nicoya Peninsula, is home to the best-known folk traditions. Along the Atlantic coast, the African musical heritage is more pronounced, and Afro-Caribbean music including rumba, calypso and reggae are popular.

In most of Costa Rica, ancient instruments such as ocarinas are being replaced by international instruments such as accordions and guitars. There are still folk styles, even outside of Guanacaste, such as the Talamanca (canton)'s Danza de los Huelos and the Boruca people's Danza de los Diablitos.

Guanacaste is the major center for Costa Rican folk music, especially pre-Columbian styles such as the Danza del Sol and Danza de la Luna of the Chorotega, who also popularized the ancient quijongo (a single-string bow and gourd resonator) and native oboe, the chirimia.

Costa Rica's population never developed a major rhythm or style that became a major part of popular music, but there have been exceptions, such as the Costa Rican landscape school of painting in the 1920s. The Andean peña tradition (an international gathering of like-minded persons) is strong in Costa Rica as well, introduced by immigrants from Chile and Argentina.

In the late 1980s some local artists and bands became famous for having their own style and original material, such as José Capmany, Distorsión, Café con Leche, Modelo Para Armar and Inconsciente Colectivo; some of them had fans from outside of Costa Rica, such as Editus, a Grammy winning contemporary jazz ensemble. At around that time a popular Latin genre developed, chiqui-chiqui (a mixture of merengue, cumbia and other Latin rhythms along with afro-pop influences) as it was known, led by bands such as Los Hicsos, Jaque Mate, La Pandylla, Manantial and La Banda with well-known classic hits such as La Avispa, El cangrejo, Julieta, El criticon, El hula hula etc.

After losing popularity around the 1990s, chiqui chiqui has resurfaced and established itself as one of the most popular and recognizable music among Costa Ricans, thanks in part to the release of CD re-editions of many classic hits. Some examples of Costa Rican hits with Chiqui chiqui are:

Bands	Song	Year
La Banda	Avispa (Suavecito)	1978
Los Abejorros	La Fiesta	1982
La Banda	Panamá Me Tombé	1982
La Pandylla	A Comer Mamey	1985
Marfil	Menealo	1985
Jaque Mate	El Pipiribao	1985
Blanco Y Negro	El Güiri Güiri	1986
Jaque Mate	El Cangrejo	1986
Manantial	Julieta	1986
Marfil	Represento	1986
La Banda	La Pastilla Del Amor	1987
La Maffia	Con Medio Peso	1988
Los Alegrísimos	El Delicuente	1988
La Empresa	Latino Soy	-
Los Hicsos	El Hula Hula	-

From the late 1990s to the present time, there has emerged a newer local rock style led by bands such as Gandhi, Evolución, Tango India, Suite Doble, Alma Bohemia, and Kadeho, all of which have been accepted positively by Costa Rican youths. There are metal bands, including Grecco, Advent of Bedlam, Corpse Garden, Catarsis Incarne, and Heresy.

The rock bands begins a new standard to CR's music with bands such as Time's Forgotten, Pneuma and Sight of Emptiness making really high albums and concerts. The international community starts to take a look at Costa Rica where bands such as Time's Forgotten plays in BajaProg (Rock Festival) and have several reviews in the best progressive magazines, sites, and radios. For example, Dividing Line put the album "Dandelion" between the best 15 album in the 2009.

Costa Rica has become a centerfold for international Rock and Metal concerts. Bands such as: Deep Purple, Aerosmith, Anthrax, Red Hot Chili Peppers, Pearl Jam, Cannibal Corpse, Apocalyptica, Arch Enemy, Green Day, Helloween, Rhapsody Of Fire, Epica, Nightwish, had come to play in the country, as well as international singers and musicians like Paul McCartney and Carlos Santana.

It became better with the coming of Iron Maiden back in 2008 for the Somewhere Back in Time World Tour, according to sponsors and the Flight 666 documentary, the concert held in Costa Rica was the largest in Central America, with over 27,000 attendants. With that concert, Costa Rica is now becoming an important stop for Metal bands. Examples of this are Metallica, Megadeth, Slayer, Judas Priest, Black Sabbath and Opeth.

Also bands venturing into Reggae and Ska are popular, one example is Mekatelyu and Michael Livingston.

Malpaís, a band emerging from the Guanacaste-area, is one of the central bands of the Costa Rican rock and music scene of today, mixing traditional Costa Rican folk and Latin music with jazz and rock and has met great success in Costa Rica and surrounding countries. Cantoamerica is a band led by Manuel Monestel that for many years has developed research and promotion of the music of the Costa Rican Caribbean coast. Calypso music and other Caribbean sounds are included in the band's repertoire. Cantoamerica has traveled all over the world as ambassador of Afro Costa Rican music.

== Costa Rica urban music ==
Costa Rica's music also includes hip hop, reggae, dancehall and electronic. Such artists as Toledo, Crypy 626, Tiko305, Huba, Gtermis (Ragga by Roots), Tapon, Shel, Gonin, Banton y Ghetto, Kike, Tinez, Original Warrior Street Reggae Artist, Poeta, Mr Pray, Jahricio, Rude Boy, Talawa Reggae Army, DJ P, Zion [Producer], Killa [Producer], aRNine [Producer], Chino Artavia, Rooper Francheschi, Kastro305 [Producer], Bloke, DJ Arturo Morales, DJ Cole, DJ accion, DJ Juan, DJ Gerarld, DJ action, Marfil (group), Moonlight Dub Xperiment (group) have a hip hop, reggae, electronic influence in their music. Starting in the mid-1990s Costa Rican hip hop and reggae culture has grown. Artist Tapon and group Ragga by Roots were the most famous artists in the late 1990s with hits such as "Creada a mi manera" by Tapon and "Jump to the sound" by Ragga by Roots.

== Classical music ==
Costa Rica also has a youth symphony orchestra, founded by ex-President José Figueres Ferrer in the 1970. "Concertina Ana Gabriela Castro-Rosabal" was the first 4-year-old girl/ child/Costa Rican to direct the Youth Symphony Orchestra into tuning in its 1970 Debut, and first 4-year-old violin soloist to play Mozart under the direction of director Gerald Brown. Violinist Ana Gabriela Castro-Rosabal, master in violin performance was the key performer for the youth symphony orchestra Debut in 1970. "La niña violinista del Taburete" was how newspapers used to refer to 4-year-old violin "Concertina Ana Gabriela Castro-Rosabal". This affectionate title, was given due to the fact, that she was so small, that she used a wooden box, made by her father Enrique, to rest her feet. The wooden box, became the "symbol" of how young this talented girl was.

== Music institutions ==
Classical music performing organizations include the Costa Rican National Symphony Orchestra (formed in 1970), which has been conducted by Americans Gerald Brown and Irwin Hoffman, followed by the Japanese Chosei Komatsu. In 2014, Carl. St. Clair assumed the position as music director. The country is also home to an opera company, one of the first professional choirs in Central America, and a state-subsidized youth orchestra, which belongs to the National Symphony Orchestra. The Universidad de Costa Rica has a concert band and an orchestra, besides an early-music group and several chamber music groups.

The National University, Universidad Nacional, has a resident string quartet and a Symphony Orchestra, which had its very successful premiere at the National Theatre in San José on May 10, 2007, conducted by Dieter Lehnhoff. It has also a highly successful piano school led by the Russian virtuoso, Alexandr Sklioutovsky. Other well-known groups are the El Café Chorale and the Sura Chamber Choir and also the pianist Ismael Pacheco, who was the first Costa Rican pianist to have been performed at the prestigious Carnegie Hall in 2001 and also at the Musikverein in 2007.

Both the Universidad de Costa Rica (UCR), in San José, and the Universidad Nacional (UNA), in Heredia, have well-structured programmes in Music, where students can pursue bachelor's degrees in instrumental and vocal performing, composition, and conducting. The latter also has a doctoral degree in Central American Arts and Letters, with an emphasis in music.

Contemporary composers include Mario Alfagüell, Marvin Camacho, Alejandro Cardona, Bernal Flores, Benjamín Gutiérrez, Luis Diego Herra, and Eddie Mora, to name but a few.

Costa Rican folk institutions include the Fantasía Folklorica. Every August, Costa Rica is home to an International Festival of Music.

In recent years the government, led by the Ministerio de Cultura, has aimed to revitalize traditional Costa Rican music.
