= Boruca =

Group of Indigenous people from Costa Rica

Coordinates: 9.000°N 83.300°W

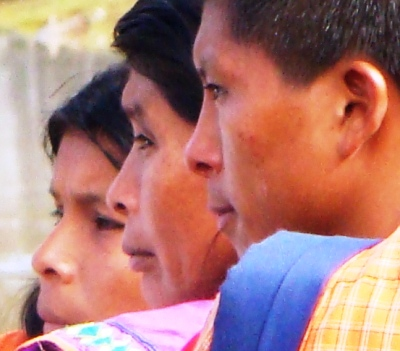
- Boruca people on a ferry crossing between Pavón, Costa Rica and Golfito, by Arturo Sotillo, 2007

Total population
- 2,660 (1990)

Regions with significant populations
- Costa Rica (Puntarenas)

Languages
- Boruca, Spanish, Brunca Sign Language

Related ethnic groups
- Bribri, Cabécar

The Boruca (also known as the Brunca or the Brunka) are an Indigenous people living in Costa Rica. The tribe has about 2,660 members, most living on a reservation in the Puntarenas Province in southwestern Costa Rica, a few miles away from the Pan-American Highway following the Rio Térraba. The ancestors of the modern Boruca made up a group of chiefdoms that ruled most of Costa Rica's Pacific coast, from Quepos to what is now the Panamanian border, including the Osa Peninsula. Boruca traditionally spoke the Boruca language, which is now nearly extinct.

Like their ancestors the Boruca are known for their art and craftwork, especially weaving and their distinctive painted balsa wood masks, which have become popular decorative items among Costa Ricans and tourists. These masks are important elements in the Borucas' annual Danza de los Diablitos ceremony, celebrated every winter since at least colonial times. The Danza depicts the resistance of the "Diablito", representing the Boruca people, against the Spanish conquistadors.

== History ==
The Boruca are a tribe of Southern Pacific Costa Rica, close to the Panama border. The tribe is a composite group, made up of the group that identified as Boruca before the Spanish colonization, as well as many neighbors and former enemies, including the Coto people, Turrucaca, Borucac, Quepos, and the Abubaes.

The population of the tribe numbers around 2,000, most of whom live on the Reserva Boruca or the neighboring indigenous reserve of Reserva Rey Curre. The Reserva Boruca-Terraba was among the first indigenous reserves established in Costa Rica in 1956. The lands currently on the reservations were named baldíos (common lands) by the General Law of Common Lands, passed by the national government in 1939, making them the inalienable and exclusive property of the indigenous people. The subsequent law of the Institute of Lands and Colonization (ITCO), passed in 1961, transferred the baldíos to state ownership. Law No. 7316, the Indigenous Law of Costa Rica, passed in 1977, laid out the fundamental rights of the indigenous peoples. This law defined "indigenous", established that the reserves would be self-governing, and set limitations on land use within the reserves.

== Location and geography ==
The majority of the Boruca tribe lives on the Reserva Indígena Boruca. This reservation is located in the canton of Buenos Aires in the Puntarenas Province of the southern Pacific zone of Costa Rica. The reservation extends 138.02 km^{2}. The reservation lies about 20 km south of the city of Buenos Aires.

In archaeological terms, Boruca (and all of Costa Rica) lies in the culture area known as the Intermediate Zone (after Willey, 1971) or Circum-Caribbean culture area (after Steward, 1949). It is called the Intermediate area because of its location between "the two areas of highest New World culture: Mesoamerica and Peru" (22 Willey).

== Language ==
The Boruca have an indigenous language known as Boruca or Brunka. It is a member of the Chibchan language family. Nevertheless, this indigenous language too is a product of the colonial period, and is actually a mixture of the speech of the several peoples that make up the modern-day Boruca. The Boruca language is nearly extinct, having only six elderly terminal speakers surviving, who speak the language fluently. Younger members of the community generally understand the language, but do not speak it. There exist 30 to 35 non-fluent speakers. It is also notable that the language is taught to the children who attend the local school. The main language in Boruca is Spanish, the native tongue and the only one spoken by the vast majority of the population.

== Folklore ==
Many traditional tales are told in the Boruca community.

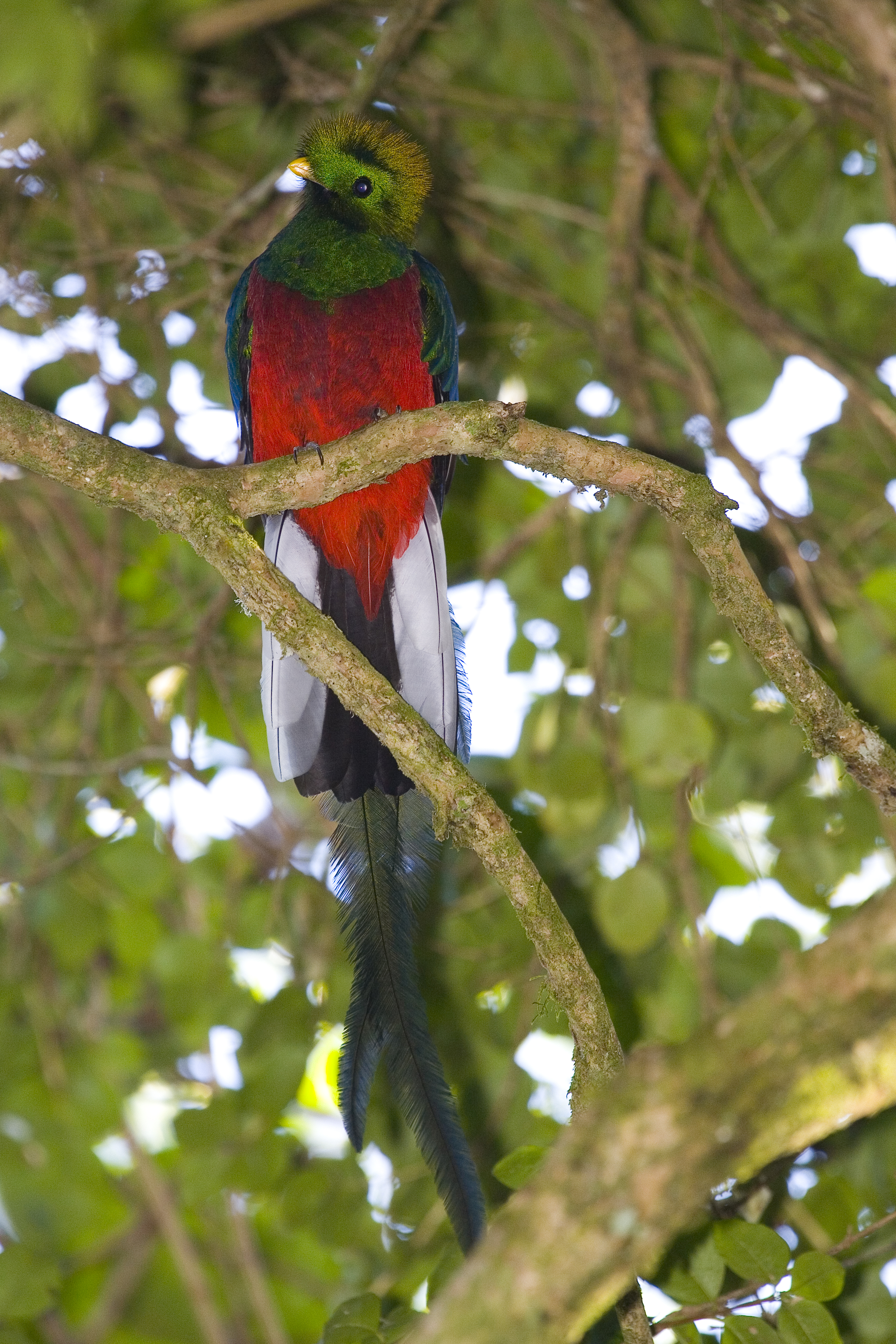
Quetzal (Pharomachrus mocinno)

=== Story of Quetzal ===
According to the story of Quetzal, there was a large village with a cacique (chief), who consistently triumphed in leading his followers in wars against other tribes. His wife was going to have a child, and his biggest worry was that he was going to die before his son was born. However, to his avail, the enemy tribes ceased attack. The cacique had a beautiful son named Satú. The sorcerers of the village were delighted to find that, on the day the baby was born, a beautiful bird perched itself atop a tree branch and began to sing a sweet song. They subsequently gifted Satú with an amulet made of gold, in the shape of the quetzal bird's head. This amulet would be Satú's eternal warrior and protector. Satú grew to be the strongest male in the village and was never injured or debilitated by wars. His uncle, Labí, was jealous of Satú because he knew that when the cacique died, Satú would be the heir to the throne. Before going to bed, Satú usually took off his amulet and stored it under his head. One night, after Satú had fallen asleep, Labí snuck into his room and stole the amulet. The next day, when Satú was walking through the forest, he heard a noise and suddenly found that he had been shot by an arrow. Labí came out from behind a bush and smiled triumphantly. As Satú did not have his amulet, he died. At that moment, a quetzal flew over, sat on top of Satú's body for a few moments, and then flew away. Labí was terrified that the quetzal would revive Satú, so he built a fire and burned both Satú and his amulet. Back at the village, the cacique was worried that something might have happened to Satú. He gathered together his soldiers to investigate. Upon entering the forest, they noticed Satú's footsteps and followed them. They encountered the still burning fire and saw a bloody arrow beside it. The cacique ordered the soldiers to extinguish the fire. After doing so, the soldiers and the cacique cried in silence, lamenting their loss of Satú. At exactly noon that day, the village heard the sound of a quetzal. The quetzal had long, shiny feathers and was perched in a tree. It then flew away to a mountain, and lived there for eternity. The current belief is that this quetzal bird contains the spirit of Satú. When the tribe fights enemies, they are accompanied by the song of the quetzal and are always victorious.

=== Brunka ===
The second story describes how the Brunka came to live in the village of Boruca. No one knows who the first people who arrived were, but it is known how they arrived. In the past, a lot of indigenous groups lived on the edge of the large river Térra (spelling unknown). Near this river the people fished, and harvested rice and plantains. An abundance of wild pigs resulted as punishment for the indigenous people's excessive hunting and consequent killing of all the other animals. So the indigenous people made arrows to run after and hunt the wild pigs. The pigs started climbing mountains and the indigenous people chased after them. Eventually they chased the pigs all the way to what is known today as Boruca. The indigenous people tried to form and organize themselves to kill the pigs, but they eventually lost the pigs. No one ever saw the pigs again. It is said that what the pigs really wanted was to bring the indigenous people to the land of Boruca, to show them the land, and to encourage them to form a community here. Some of the people that came to the new land stayed to set up the community, while others went to get family members. Some of the people didn't want to come to the new community and wanted to stay by the river. Hence two Brunka communities formed, one by the river and one in the new land. In the new land, the people started having meetings. The people started thriving due to an abundance of food from the river and families grew very large. However, brothers and sisters started living together. Sibú, the creator of everything, didn't like this so he ordered a jaguar to eat all the brothers and sisters that lived together. In this way, the jaguar saved many families and allowed them to grow. For this reason, the elders say that the jaguar is very sacred. There is a large rock with the hand prints of the jaguar near the community.

Other important stories in the community include La historia del Mamram, Kuazran, La desgracia de Mahuata, Durí y Yamanthí en un amor prohibido, La princesa encantada, La trengaza de ajerca y Durik, El príncipe cuervo, Los Diablitos, Las piedras blancas, La culebra diabólica, La chichi, El Dorado, El viaje sin retorno, and Como nació la quebrada Brúnoun.

Unlike most folktales in the United States, the stories here do not culminate with a moral. Their purposes are more to explain certain superstitions, describe the characteristics of landmarks, or explain the importance of locations. Thus, the stories' purpose was less to impart a moral, and more to serve as a key to the Boruca culture. In other words, the stories are not meant to be didactic. Rather, knowledge of the tales shed light on particular aspects of the culture.

Some members of the community are reluctant to share the folklore they knew in its entirety. Indeed, it has been openly explained that they are generally uncomfortable in sharing knowledge of their heritage. These disinclinations may be a fear of undermining the value of their culture. Fully sharing their folkloric knowledge would detract from its sacred nature, purity, and confidentiality. While it is debatable that these tactics are hindering or aiding the preservation of the Brunka culture, it may be felt that by completely disclosing their knowledge, it would be vulnerable to becoming tainted.

In Doris Stone's 1968 anthropological study of the Boruca, she claimed that many of the legends and myths were lost over time. Yet it has been mentioned that there is an abundance of folklore that many of the village elders still preserve. Additionally, there is carryover of legends over time. The repeated mention of certain tales indicates a continued level of cultural relevancy and importance from the late 1960s to present 2010. However, this preservation applies solely to the mention of the story, rather than the content and details of the stories.

== Economy ==
The population of the Reserva Indígena Boruca subsists mainly on small-scale agriculture and the profits reaped from the sale of indigenous crafts. They are best known for masks made for the "Fiesta de los Diablitos" (or "Danza de los Diablitos"). The masks, depicting stylized devil faces, are worn by the men of Boruca during the fiesta. The masks are usually made of balsa wood or sometimes cedar, and may be painted or left natural. Women weave utilizing pre-Columbian back-strap looms., are also sold.

The majority of the indigenous population throughout Costa Rica makes their living from agriculture, and for this reason the reduction of indigenous lands and its occupation by non-indigenous people has a serious effect on the livelihood of those who live on the reserves.

Article Three of the Indigenous Law of Costa Rica specifically states, "Non-indigenous [people] may not rent or buy … lands or farms included within these reserves." According to Article 5, the ITCO (the Institute of Lands and Colonization) must relocate the non-indigenous land owners of good faith in the Reserves, or expropriate and indemnify them.

Despite this, large portions of the population on the reserves are non-indigenous, and large portions of the land are not owned by indigenous people. Specifically, only 43.9% of the land in Boruca was in indigenous hands in 1994, while indigenous individuals made up only 46.9% of the population. The situation was worse yet in the neighboring reserve of Rey Curré, where only 23.3% of the land was owned by indigenous people, while a full 58.9% of the population was indigenous [5]. The Indigenous Law defines indigenous people as those who "constitute ethnic groups descendant directly from pre-Columbian civilizations that conserve their own identity" [6].

== Traditional foods and drinks ==
The Brunka people have a similar diet to the majority of Costa Rica, however there are some dishes and drinks unique to Boruca. The following are the most common traditional dishes and drinks of Boruca and the methods in which they are prepared:

=== Tamales ===
Tamales can be prepared using rice, corn, or beans. All three types are considered special and served only at specific occasions, such as birthdays and when guests come to Boruca. The rice tamale is made by mixing uncooked rice with salt and oil. This compound can also be seasoned with chili, onion, ayote, or additional salt. Once finished, the rice is placed on a bijagua leaf, followed by pork and a final layer of rice. The leaf is then folded around the rice and pork and tied. The dish must cook for at least six hours. The corn variant is prepared in the same way, except that corn is used instead of rice and must only be cooked for one hour. The bean version can be made in the same manner but uses mashed beans instead of corn. The rice is most common.

=== Carne ahumada ===
Carne ahumada is a traditional dish that is still consumed regularly today. It is prepared by seasoning pork with salt, onions, and garlic and smoking it in the fire for at least one hour. The longer the pork is smoked, the longer it can last without refrigeration.

=== Palmito ===
Palmito (heart of palm) is served only at special ceremonies and parties. It is first cut from the heart of its tree, which grows in the mountains. It is then cut up and mixed with sweet chili and ayote. Finally, it is cooked with a small amount of salt water and served as a vegetarian dish.

=== Zapito ===
Zapito is usually served during weeklong funeral ceremonies for deceased community members. It is prepared by mixing corn and water and then grinding with a coconut. This compound is combined with water and sugar. The final product is used as a topping.

=== Chocado ===
Chocado is not reserved for any particular event. It is made by taking ripened bananas and grinding them with a special tool. This utensil has five edges and is made from a tree that only grows in the mountains.

=== Chicha ===
Chicha is the most common traditional drink. It is offered at special occasions, such as the arrival of esteemed guests to the community or the ceremony of the diablitos. It is made by grinding corn sprouts into meal. After sifting out the grains, water and sugar are added. Yeast is then added to the liquid and left to ferment for a couple of days.

== Arts and crafts ==
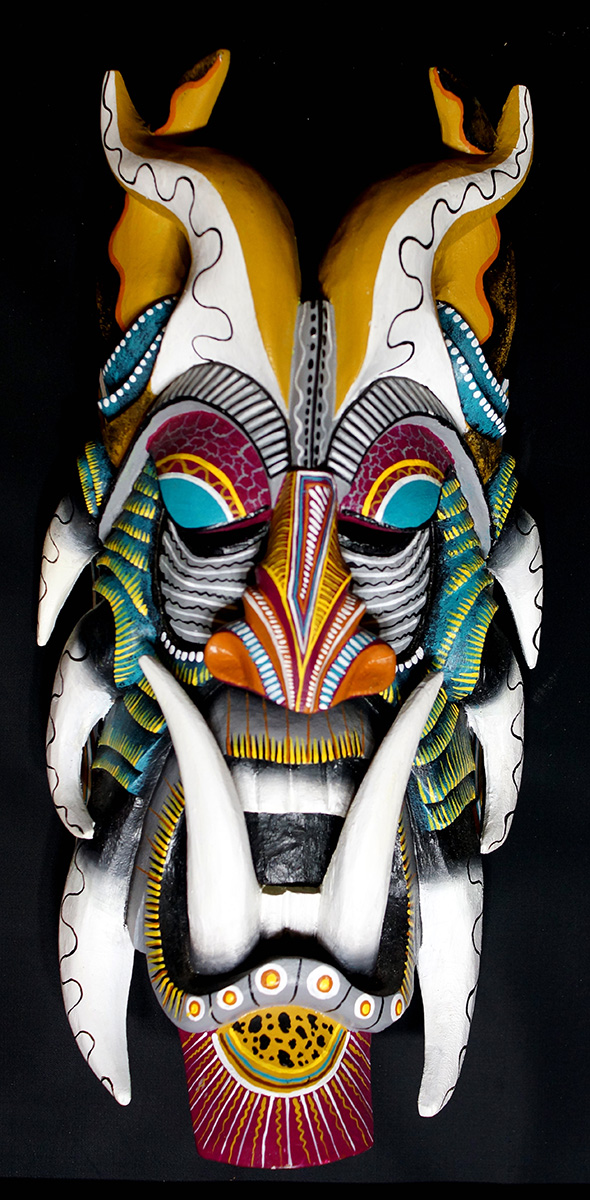
Traditional Boruca mask

The Brunca's arts and crafts are an integral part of the community, having both economic and cultural importance. Approximately 80% of the population participate in artisanry and sell their crafts chiefly to tourists. The major crafts of the Brunca are masks, woven goods, bows and arrows, drums, daggers, and jewelry. All of these items carry cultural significance and symbolic value.

The Brunca are best known for their handcrafted masks that are used during the Juego de los Diablitos (The Dance of the Little Devils) festival, the traditional New Years celebration. Masks generally fall into three categories: a representation of the devil, the ecological devil, and a depiction of ecological scenery. The masks portraying the devil are the most relevant to Brunca culture—although they may seem frightening or sinister to an outsider, the Brunca view these masks as a symbol of wellbeing and believe that they serve as protection from evil spirits. Similarly, in some ecological masks, the devil is portrayed in combination with nature; the devil represents protection of the ecological system, particularly the animals surrounding the village. The ecological masks cater more toward tourists and typically feature landscapes, plants, and animals. Mask making has traditionally been a male trade; however, the process often includes both sexes—men carving and women painting. Recently, women have entered into the mask carving trade: as of 2010 there are approximately five women in the community carving masks.

Other crafts and works of art are less common, but still contribute to community's economy. The majority of textile workers are women. The use of thread, tinted with natural dyes is common in producing items such as bags, scarves, blankets, and wallets. The Brunca are the only indigenous group in Costa Rica that weave, although only in small amounts (Stone 1949: 17). Daggers or puñales are sold as decorative objects, but carry historical reference to past chiefs or caciques. Often adorned with nene beads, pejibaye seeds, thread, and feathers of birds (namely toucans), these puñales were used to capture game.

== Natural dyes ==
The Brunca use a variety of plant species, as well as a mollusk as sources of natural dyes for their textiles. Sacatinta (Justicia spicigera) releases a navy blue dye when boiled in water for several days. Sacatinta leaves also release a greenish blue dye when burned in the fire, then placed in cold water, and lastly rubbed together. Teca (Tectona grandis) produces a red dye when the leaves are wet and then rubbed together. Also, the rhizomes of the Yuquilla plant (Curcuma longa) can be smashed and rubbed together to form a yellow dye, which can become fixed and more vibrant with the addition of lime. A paste made from the Achiote fruit (Bixa orellana) forms an orange dye. Furthermore, the bark of the Nance tree (Byrsonima crassifolia) can be soaked in water to release a dark reddish-brown dye. Finally, one more important plant for dying purposes is known as tuyska in the Brunca language, but its scientific name is unknown. Its vibrant purple dye is released in the same way as Sacatinta: by boiling the leaves for several days.

The scientific names and common names of the natural dye sources and color
Scientific name	Common name	Color
Purpura patula	Purpura	Purple
Byrsonima crassifolia	Nance	Red
Curcuma longa	Yuquilla	Yellow
Justicia tinctoria	Azul de Mata	Blue
Tectona grandis	Teca	Dark Red
Jacobina spicigera	Sacatinta	Dark Blue-Green
Guarea guara	Carbonero (mixed with barro)	Black
Neurolaena lobata	Gavilana	Green
Mangifera indica	Mango	Yellow-Orange
Indigofera hirta	Tuika" (in Brunca)	Blue
Bixa orellana	Achiote	Orange
Cucurbita foetidissima	Calabaza	Orange-Brown
Prunus cornifolia	Amorillo`n	Brown
Rhizophora mangle	Mangle	Gold
Unknown	Tuyska" (in Brunca)	Purple

When Doris Stone visited the Brunca community in 1968, there was much less variety in natural dye sources. Back then, the traditional ecological knowledge (TEK) was not diverse, and the Brunca used the plants native to Costa Rica for their dyes. Nowadays, the Brunca have cultivated plant species that are native to Southeast Asia for dying purposes, such as Curcuma longa and Tectona grandis, illustrating that the TEK has spread drastically over the past 40 years. She discusses several of the sources still used today. These examples include Purpura patula, the Carbonero tree, and the upright indigo the Brunca call Tuika˝. She also mentions the use of the Sangrilla tree (Pterocarpus officinalis), also known as Padauk. However, Padauk is not used anymore due to the difficulty in preparing the dye. Also, another mollusk (Purpura kiosquiformia) used to be used for its purple dye, but the Brunca had to swim out to sea for these shells and kill them, while the P. patula releases its dye as a defense mechanism and does not need to be killed. Today, the red color that Padauk offered can be taken from the Nance tree or from Teca (teakwood).

== Traditional festivals ==
The most famous of Boruca festivals is the three-day New Year's festival, called the "Juego de los Diablos" or the "Fiesta de los Diablitos," which runs from December 31 to January 2. The history behind the modern festival begins with the Spanish conquest. The early Spanish conquistadors called the indigenous people devils because they noticed that the indigenous were not baptized and therefore assumed that they worshiped the devil. For this reason, one of the characters in the festival is called the "diablo," or devil. The diablos dress in intricate masks carved from balsa wood. The masks represent the defense of the indigenous against the Spanish; in the face of the Spanish's advanced weaponry, the indigenous had only natural defenses and believed in the power of animals like the jaguar. Thus, the masks display fierce animal and devil designs painted in bright, acrylic colors. The diablos also dress in "sacos" made from the cloth of "gangoche," which are covered in large banana leaves, or "munshi" in the Brunka language. This costume represents the natural spirit of the indigenous, and practically, can help protect players during the festival. The Spanish conquistadors are represented as one character is the festival—the "torro," or bull. All interactions between the diablos and the torro are symbolic of the historical struggles between the indigenous people and the Spanish. The ultimate triumph of the indigenous, or diablos, at the end of the festival symbolizes the survival of the Brunka and their culture in spite of Spanish colonial power.

The festival, also called the dance, begins the night of December 30. Around 9 pm, the diablos, played by local males ages 14 or older, assemble in a clearing in the mountains near the town of Boruca. This location is said to be the birthplace of the diablos. There, they organize themselves and wait for the signal of the "Diablo Mayor," or elder devil. The Mayor is typically an older male in the community that has participated in the festival for many years. The Mayor directs the festival proceedings. Carrying his conch, he instructs the other diablos where to dance and how long to remain at each location. At midnight on the night of the 30th, which soon becomes the morning of the 31st, the Mayor blows his conch to signal to the diablos the beginning of the celebration. To notify the rest of the town, the church bells ring to the tune of the funerary song, marking the death the year. At the commencement of the festival, the diablos stream down the hill and dance to the central square, where they celebrate together until the early morning hours. The dance of involves jumping and connecting back to back in order to raise a fellow diablo off the ground. The tune of the dance is set by one drum accompanied by a flute. Unlike the role of the Mayor, the role of the drummer and flautist is exchanged between many different men in the community. Around 2 am on the 31st, the celebration pauses and is set to resume later in the morning.

Around 9 am on the 31st, the Mayor sounds his conch to awaken and call the diablos, who then spend the entire day in the community dancing on the porches of every household and drinking chicha, a traditional alcoholic beverage made from corn seedlings fermented with yeast, and eating tamales. In the festival commemorating the end of 2009, there were 80 diablos that danced. Because the festival has grown so large, the proceedings now involve "arrediadores," or herders, who stay at the back of the procession to make sure that no diablo is left behind. The diablos pass through the town three times during the day. This part of the celebration represents the glory of the Brunka prior to the Spanish conquest. On the morning of January 1, the historical significance shifts because the torro, representing the relentless conquest of the Spanish, joins the dance. The role of the torro is played by many different men in the community. The costume is constructed out of light balsa wood and filled with dry leaves that burn easily at the end of the festival. The mask on the costume is constructed of a durable cedar wood, but has horns from a real bull. The torro chases the diablos around the town, still guided by the sound of the Mayor's conch. The dance between the two characters involves the diablos taunting the torro until the torro affords them a durable blow. At first, the diablos are able to taunt and resist the torro, but as dancing progresses through the evening and into the morning of the 2nd, the torro begins to dominate, as is true in the history of the Spanish colonization. By 3 pm on the 2nd, the torro has killed all of the diablos. Following the death of the last diablo, an action that represents the subjugation of the Brunka by the Spanish, the diablos begin to resurrect themselves one by one. As the diablos come back to life, the tides of the celebration begin to turn once more. The torro hides as the diablos begin to hunt for him with the help of a new character, the "perro," or the dog. The diablos and the perro dance through the town looking for the torro. When they finally find and capture him, female diablitos, played by males, plead on his behalf. Their pleads, however, go unanswered, and the torro is taken to the river where his costume, with the exception of the mask, is burned. The burning of the torro marks both the end of the festival and the ultimate survival of the Brunka.

There are many different roles in the dance of the Juego de los Diablos, but no roles include women. This may be due to the fact that historically, Brunka women did not have much power in the organization and traditions of the community. More recently, however, women have assumed an active role in the festival by participating in activities such as the Organizational Committee. This committee is composed of males and females and begins meeting in early November to plan the festivities. The festival is by far the largest event in Boruca during the year, and it attracts many tourists, so the committee must organize purchasing of food, housing for the tourists, and the logistics of the dance itself. During the actual festival, many women prepare and provide food for the diablos and the tourists. The festival involves the diablos stopping outside of every house to dance, and after which they break for tamales and chicha. Certain women in the community volunteer to provide lunch for all of the diablos at the town "salon", or community center. The women in the household also take charge of the tourists. If the family has room, the woman will rent spare bedrooms to tourists, feed them, and tend to their needs. Lastly, some women and children follow the dancing diablos to watch the festival up-close. This procession is most prominent around the time when the torro is killing diablos and later, when it is burned.

== Historical political structure ==
According to Doris Stone, as of 1949, "[m]ost traces of political organization [had] disappeared" (Stone 1949: 23). The main authority in the town at that time was the police officer, who was appointed by the government of Costa Rica. His power, however, was dependent to some degree on a council of elders, consisting of the four to six oldest men in the town. This council had the authority to approve or disapprove the appointment of the officer. The council was at one point "all-powerful" (Stone 1949: 24), and was currently at the top of a minimized cargo system. The council chose men to fill the two mayordomo positions, and two women to cook for the church. The mayordomos had certain responsibilities during fiestas and visits from the priest, and were appointed yearly.

Article 4 of Law No. 7316, "the Indigenous Law" states, "The Reserves will be governed by the indigenous people in their traditional community structures or by the laws of the Republic…".

== Social and political structure ==
Various forces work to improve and govern the Brunka community. The Development Association serves as the lead governing body and the Women's Organization is the central cultural force in the community. Other important socio-political influences include the Catholic Church, the Cultural Radio Station, the Youth Organization, the primary and secondary schools, and artisan groups.

=== Development Association (Asociación de Desarollo) ===
Founded in 1973, the Development Association directs virtually all matters in the community. It has been cited as the most influential organization in the Boruca community, serving as the link between community groups and the national government. The assembly consists of a president, two secretaries, a treasurer, a public prosecutor, and two representative speakers. The president serves a two-year term. The organization serves to implement economic projects and functions to settle civilian disputes within the community. Every third Sunday of the month, the body meets to address grievances such as land disputes and civil conflicts at the neighbor council (Atención de Vecinos). If the disagreement cannot be settled, the case is sent to a higher tribunal. This body, also made up entirely of Brunka representatives, requires each defendant to have documentation of their experience with the Development Association and three witnesses. The Development Association works directly with the national government of Costa Rica to protect the rights and fight for the autonomy of the Brunka in order to preserve indigenous identity. The group works with a non-indigenous lawyer in San José to address issues of land use, specifically regarding matters of non-indigenous farmers purchasing land within the Brunka territory. In addition, the Development Association was instrumental in the establishment of a local high school in 1997 in Boruca by coordinating with the Ministry of Education.

=== Women's Organization (La Asociación de Flor) ===
The Women's Organization was founded in 1983, initially to help raise money to allow students to attend high schools outside of Boruca. At the time, there was only a primary school in the community, limiting the education Brunka children could receive. Now, the Women's Organization serves as the second-most important group in the community, working in many ways to rescue and maintain the Brunka culture and language. It is currently headed by a president and contains 36 active members. The organization also works to generate income for the community through the museum, crafts, and tourism. One program arranges students and visitors to experience Brunka culture through homestays, meals, and a tour of the community. Additionally, the organization travels to other coastal communities to sell masks and other Brunka crafts. The President has met with other organizations and countries and participated in educational videos to present the Brunka culture on behalf her organization. With the support of Banco Popular, the Women's Organization has established a community fund that provides financial assistance for residents who cannot afford sufficient food. These services include providing financial assistance to families as at the pulperia (corner store), helping purchase corn, and covering medical costs and those needing medical attention. The Women's Organization also works closely with the Development Association.

=== Local Catholic Parish ===
The Catholic Parish of the Boruca community plays a key role in providing spiritual guidance to its followers and addresses problematic issues in the community. The church provides some sense of unity in a society pulled in various, conflicting directions. In a greater Boruca community of around 6,000 people (including Brunka and non-Brunka) about 2,000 citizens participate regularly in parish activities. The Church also functions as another organizational center to start projects or organize programs for the youth. For example, currently the Parish is organizing the construction of a public plaza next to the church, designated for playing soccer and other community games and celebrations. The church leader usually strives to address touchy social issues in the community, especially relating to youth. In the past, the Priest has assumed the responsibility to confront youth issues such as alcohol and drug use, prostitution, and teenage pregnancy. The Father serves as a spiritual, and not political, leader and strives to unite the community.

=== Cultural Radio Station ===
The Cultural Radio Station of Boruca, founded on September 24, 1982, operates as an informer and cultural preservative for the Brunka people. ICER, a Costa Rican governmental organization based in San José, initiated the formation of this radio station. The radio broadcast reaches the vast majority of Costa Ricans living in the southwest region of the country. The station functions as an organizational, developmental, and cultural instrument for the Brunka community. Regarding organization and development for the society, various community groups utilize this information diffuser for distributing knowledge of celebrations and meetings in the town. Culturally, education administrators use the station to broadcast and teach the Brunka language, along with programming cultural programs on the air such as presentations of local legends. The station is designated for the use of the Brunka people. Consequently, the radio station has worked with most of the community's groups, including the Women's Organization, the Youth Organization (ASJOB), the local EBAIS (primary Costa Rican health care unit), and the local high school. The music played at the station includes a wide variety of genres, ranging from traditional mestizo Latin American music to modern reggaeton.

=== Additional community influences ===
There is a limited police presence in Boruca. The officers rotate between communities within the county of Buenos Aires. Police spend six days within the Brunka community, followed by four days of absence. Some of the members of the law enforcement team are Brunka, while others have non-indigenous backgrounds.

The local youth group in Boruca is called ASJOB. The group consists of approximately 40 individuals and is open to local high school students for participation. The group works with the Cultural Radio station to announce events and also has connections to the Development Association.

== Volunteer presence ==
The Peace Corps has an active presence in Boruca and the surrounding villages since the early 1990s, forming the first Indigenous youth group of Costa Rica. The group was named Movimiento Juvenil Brunka (MOJUBRU) and later became La Assosacion Juvenil Brunka (ASJOB). A volunteer also helped establish the first kindergarten in Boruca.

WorldTeach, an educational volunteer program, has sent a full-year English teacher to Escuela.
