= Sura Chamber Choir =

Sura Chamber Choir (Coro Surá in Spanish) is a musical institution from Costa Rica, regarded as one of the most promising choirs to have emerged from Central America, having participated in concerts all over the world. "Surá" is the name of a tree in Costa Rica that dates from the pre-Columbian era.

Coro Surá believe that each member of the choir represents a branch of the tree, which in unison, provides the tree itself in the form of harmonious sound.

== Founded ==
Founded in May 1988, Coro Surá was the first professional choir in Central America, recording their first CD in 1995, entitled Surá. Members must have graduated from a music program or have significant choral experience.

== Conductor ==
Ms. Angela Cordero

== Concerts ==
- 1994 - Jorge Medina Leal Second International Choir Festival, Mexico
- 1995 - Seventeenth International Choir Festival in Guayaquil, Ecuador
- 1995 - Fifth Iberian-American Arts Festival, Nicaragua
- 1997 - J.S. Bach Cantata No.4 " Christ lag in Todesbanden " Melico Salazar, Costa Rica
- 2003 - Spring festival in Moscow, Russia *

note* For the year 2003 the choir was invited to perform in Belgium, The Netherlands, Germany, and to participate in the spring festival in Moscow, Russia.

== Discography ==
- 1995 "Surá"
- 1996 "Surá - Christmas Carols"
- 1997 "Surá - Latino"
