= Stevie Salas =

American guitarist

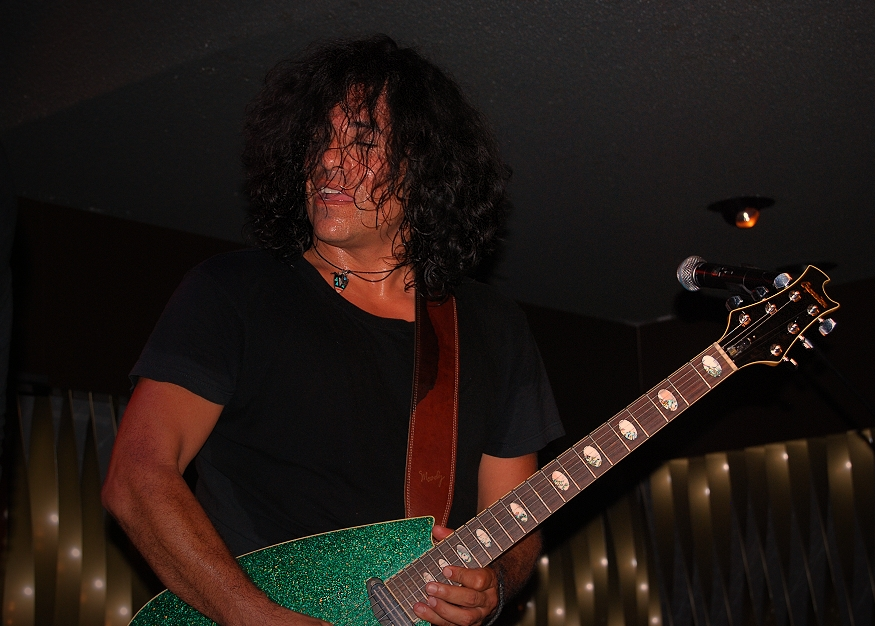
- Salas in 2009

Background information
- Genre: Rock
- Occupations: Musician
- Instruments: Guitar
- Years active: 1980s–present
- Website: http://www.steviesalas.com/

Stevie Salas is an American guitarist. In addition to his solo work, he has recorded with George Clinton, Justin Timberlake, Buddy Miles, T.I., Mick Jagger, and Rod Stewart. He is of Mescalero Apache descent.

== Career ==
In 1990, Salas released his first solo album, Stevie Salas Colorcode.

In 1993, he released Stevie Salas Presents: The Electric Pow Wow, a covers album of songs that inspired Salas as a youth featuring guest artists like Zakk Wylde, Glenn Hughes, T.M. Stevens, Richie Kotzen and Slim Jim Phantom. Then, in 1994, Salas released Back from the Living in Japan, where his singles "Start Again" and "Tell Your Story Walkin" were released. During this time, he also appeared on the album Rats by, then girlfriend, Sass Jordan.

From 2006 to 2010, Salas served as music director and consultant for American Idol and 19 Entertainment nurturing Kris Allen, Adam Lambert, Chris Daughtry, and their respective touring bands for subsequent American tours.

Salas began working as host and executive producer of the Canadian Music TV series Arbor Live for APTN. In mid-2009, Salas co-founded, with the internet entrepreneur Laurence Dorazio, the company Rockstar Solos, LLC, which focuses on iPhone and iPad gaming and entertainment application development. The first application also called Rockstar Solos became available in the iTunes Store in December 2009.

In 2009, Salas worked with T.I and Justin Timberlake on the song "Dead and Gone", which eventually reached No. 2 on the US Billboard Chart.

Salas is Executive Producer of 'RUMBLE: The Indians Who Rocked the World', a Native American music documentary for PBS and Super Channel. (2017 Sundance winner for Masterful Storytelling). Executive Producer and Creator of Dreamcatcher Bios (currently in production). Produced by Rezolution Pictures Montreal Canada for APTN television. Co-Wrote and Produced the new project/band INABA/SALAS with Japanese superstar vocalist, multi-instrumentalist and songwriter Koshi Inaba for the Japanese record label Vermillion Records. Chubby Groove album was released on January 18, 2017 and was the No. 2 album in the country that week, and remained in the top 10 for several weeks after. The album was supported by sold-out Chubby Groove Tour 2017 that played throughout Japan in January/February 2017. The record was certified Gold in Japan on October 4, 2017.

Salas is former advisor of contemporary music at the Smithsonian National Museum of the American Indian. In 2022, he played guitar on tour with the MC5 led by guitarist Wayne Kramer and featuring singer Brad Brooks, bassist Vicki Randle, and drummer Winston Watson.

== Musical influences ==
Salas' musical influences are derived mainly from the late 60s and 70s rock and roll music, as well as funk. Salas has been influenced by notable musicians such as James Brown, Jimi Hendrix, Mick Ronson, David Bowie, and Frank Black.

== Discography ==
=== Solo career ===
==== Studio albums ====
- Stevie Salas Colorcode (1990)
- Stevie Salas Presents: The Electric Pow Wow (1993)
- Back from the Living (1994)
- Alter Native (1996)
- Alter Native Gold (1997)
- The Sometimes Almost Never Was (1998)
- Shapeshifter: The Fall and Rise of Stevie No Wonder (2002)
- Stevie Salas Presents: The Soulblasters of the Universe (2004)
- Be What It Is (2006)
- Set It on Blast!! (2008)
- Jam Power (2010)

==== EPs ====
- Stuff (1991)
- Alter Native E.P. (1996)

==== Live albums ====
- Bootleg Like a Mug!!: Live in Japan (1991)
- All That... And Born to Mack: Live in Japan (1995)
- Le Bootleg: Live in Paris (1997)

==== Compilations ====
- Anthology of Stevie Salas Colorcode: 1987–1994 (1996)
- Seoul Power (1997)
- Viva la Noise (1998)
- Sol Power
- Stevie Salas Presents: The Soulblasters of the Universe (2004)
- The Essential Stevie Salas, Volume 1 (2006)
- The Sun and the Earth: The Essential Stevie Salas, Vol. 1

== Collaborations ==
=== Hardware ===
(Stevie Salas, Buddy Miles & Bootsy Collins)

- 1992: Third Eye Open

=== Nicklebag ===
(Stevie Salas & Bernard Fowler)

- 1995: 12 Hits and a Bump
- 1997: Mas Feedback

=== Inaba/Salas ===
(Stevie Salas & Koshi Inaba)

- 2017: Chubby Groove
- 2020: Maximum Huavo
- 2025: Atomic Chihuahua

=== Matney ===
(Stevie Salas & Mike Matney)

- 2024: The Redneck and The Red Man
