= Cargo system =

The cargo system (also known as the civil-religious hierarchy, fiesta or mayordomía system) is a collection of secular and religious positions held by men or households in rural indigenous communities throughout central and southern Mexico and Central America. These revolving offices, or cargos, become the unpaid responsibility of men who are active in civic life. They typically hold a given post for a term of one year, and alternate between civic and religious obligations from year to year. Office holders execute most of the tasks of local governments and churches. Individuals who hold a cargo are generally obligated to incur the costs of feasting during the fiestas that honor particular saints.

Where it is practiced, there is generally some expectation of all local men to take part in this cargo system throughout their lives. Office holders assume greater responsibilities as they grow in stature in the community. Such progression requires substantial financial resources, but eventually an individual who holds a requisite number of posts in service to his community retires and joins a group of elders instrumental in community decision-making, including appointing people to cargos.

This expectation of local men to take part in this system is both an economic and a social one, as those who do not contribute are seen as not being deserving of living in the village. It served to create a village system where the old were helped by the young and women helped by men. Furthermore, the legal enforcement of village obligations solidified communal (social) identity, rather than an identity dependent upon and linked to the national state. The cargo system has also been considered influenced by traditional Hispanic customs, as the municipal government provided the tradition of cargas consejiles, where village residents are obligated to serve post terms.

During the 19th and 20th centuries, the cargo system was a ladder system in which indigenous men could climb up. The cargo system was mainly defined as a public labor and community service. Villages that were impoverished were able to get help easier because taxes were not charged, yet public work was given. It was a system which involved faithful and long term community service. Men and women (husband and wife) were considered one unit, men needed their wives in order to succeed in their community. Women did not claim rights in relation to village government.

== History ==
The origins of the cargo system are tied to the efforts of Spanish missionaries to convert indigenous peoples of the Americas to Christianity while at the same time forestalling their cultural Hispanicization. After the Spanish conquest of Mesoamerica in the 16th century, many Indians were forcibly relocated to pueblos, which like Spanish villages contained a church as the town center. Priests were one of many special interest foreigners who had control over the political and social affairs of indigenous peoples, and they had dominion over many of these pueblos and had the authority to keep other colonists out. The priests were mindful that much of their influence over the Indians stemmed from the priests' ability to speak Indian languages. Despite a 1550 royal edict calling for native peoples to be taught the Spanish language, missionaries continued to minister to them in Nahuatl and other local languages, thus preserving a major source of Indian dependency on the church. The colonial church did not insist on excessive Catholicization of existing indigenous practices, so long as there was no clear conflict between the two.

Because the missionaries were small in number, they increasingly placed religious responsibilities in the hands of trusted members of the villages. The village mayor or alcalde was charged with the responsibility of leading the villagers in a procession to Sunday Mass. Over time, these processions were conducted with greater ceremony, making use of trappings such as crosses, incense, and music.

The cargo system was used and transformed by communities within the context of law to eliminate noble exemption privileges. This brought to an end many internal feuds over principales with regards to nobility. Noble exemptions were opposed by the common people, who were worried that such exemptions would negatively impact the supply of labour to the point of constant service. It was impossible to become part of the nobility by marrying the daughter of a noble, and was instead pushed by claimants based on heritage. Therefore, in practice, the system was not as egalitarian as in the hypothetical sense, because while some men could move to greater positions and into seats of authority, others lacked the prestige to accomplish the same. The dispersal of the ability to accumulate wealth along with prestige also contributed greatly to the transformation of these villages.

On occasion drawing on a Spanish institution called the cofradías, the priests created a hierarchy of village posts in order to better organize the religious and civil lives of their Indians. Indigenous people filled these roles, which in theory gave them greater status within the community. These roles, however, also placed economic obligations on their recipients and the clergy used them as a way to exercise control over the villagers. Villagers were obligated to organize efforts to discharge debts related to cost of food, wafers and wine for the Mass and payment of the priests.

The cargo system could a serve a manner in which people could elevate their station in society. People who faithfully discharged their duties through a series of mundane tasks could increase their social status which resulted in greater access for job opportunities and loftier positions. In short, community service allowed one to move up in the hierarchy of their society. Eventually villagers could reach a high ranking position as members of the principals, who in turn would vote for the communal leader, the gobernadores. The caciques ore pre-Hispanic nobles were exempt from the low standing positions, although a person from meager beginnings could ultimately serve to accumulate wealth and power.

The cargo system also affected marital life. The man would work in the household of his in-laws. After marriage, the wife would move in with the groom's family in which she served as a domestic servant for her mother-in law.

== See also ==
- Indigenous peoples of the Americas
- Potlatch
- Spanish colonization of the Americas

== Sources ==
- Frank Cancian, Economics and prestige in a Maya community : the religious cargo system in Zinacantan. Stanford (Calif.) : Stanford University Press, 1965, 238 p.
- Chance, John K.; William B. Taylor. Cofradías and Cargos: An Historical Perspective on the Mesoamerican Civil-Religious Hierarchy. American Ethnologist, Vol. 12, No. 1. (Feb., 1985), pp. 1–26.
- Dewalt, Billie R. Changes in the Cargo Systems of MesoAmerica, Anthropological Quarterly, Vol. 48, No. 2. (Apr., 1975), pp. 87–105.
- Friedlander, Judith. The Secularization of the Cargo System: An Example from Postrevolutionary Central Mexico (in Research Reports and Notes). Latin American Research Review, Vol. 16, No. 2. (1981), pp. 132–143.
- Guardino, Peter. “Community Service, Liberal Law, and Local Custom in Indigenous Villages: Oaxaca, 1750-1850.” Honor, Status and Law in Modern Latin America, Duke University Press, 2005, pp. 50–57.
