= Secret Code =

Studio album by Aya Kamiki
- Released: July 12, 2006
- Recorded: 2006
- Genre: J-Pop, Rock
- Length: 51:59
- Label: Giza Studio
- Producer: Aya Kamiki; Daiko Nagato

Aya Kamiki chronology
Secret Code (2006)	Ashita no Tame ni ~Forever More~ (2007)

Singles from Secret Code
- 1. "Communication Break" Released: March 15, 2006; 2. "Pierrot" Released: April 12, 2006; 3. "Mou Kimi Dake wo Hanashitari wa Shinai" Released: May 31, 2006

Secret Code is the debut major album by artist Aya Kamiki, released on July 12, 2006. It comes in a CD only version. Secret Code debuted at number 5 on the Oricon Weekly Charts for Japan and sold 70756 copies in total. "Secret Code" was used as the ending theme song for JAPAN COUNTDOWN.

== Track listing ==
1. Communication Break
2. Pierrot (ピエロ)
3. (もう君だけを離したりはしない)
4. Secret Code
5. Bounce, Bounce, Bounce
6. Pride of Place (プライド オブ プレイス)
7. Natsu no Aru Hi (夏のある日)
8. I Sing This Song For You
9. Kizudarake Demo Dakishimete (傷だらけでも抱きしめて)
10. Believe in YOU
11. Can't stop fallin' in LOVE
12. Changing The World
13. Friends (フレンズ)

== Sales ==
Initial week estimate: 31,158
Total estimate: 65,004
