= A Classic Education =

Italian alternative pop band

- Origin: Bologna, Italy
- Genres: Psychedelic pop, pop rock, alternative
- Years active: 2007–hiatus
- Labels: Bailiwick, Holiday Records, Lefse Records
- Members: Jonathan Clancy; Paul Pieretto; Luca Mazzieri; Federico Oppi; Giulia Mazza
- Past members: Stefano Roveda

A Classic Education is an alternative pop band from Italy.

== Discography ==
- Call It Blazing (2011 - Lefse Records)
- Hey There Stranger EP (2010 - Lefse Records)
- First EP (2008, self-produced)
