= 2009 in Japanese music =

The following is an overview of the year 2009 in Japanese music. It includes notable awards, lists of number-ones, yearly best-sellers, albums released, groups established and disestablished, deaths of notable Japanese music-related people as well as any other relevant Japanese music-related events. For overviews of the year in music from other countries, see 2009 in music.

== Events ==
- December 31 – 60th NHK Kōhaku Uta Gassen

== Awards ==
- May 30 – 2009 MTV Video Music Awards Japan
- December 30 – 51st Japan Record Awards

== Number-ones ==
- Oricon number-one albums
- Oricon number-one singles
- Hot 100 number-one singles
- RIAJ Digital Track Chart number-one singles

== Best-sellers ==
=== Artists ===
The two best-selling music artists in Japan in 2009 by value of sales, including sales of records and of DVDs and Blu-rays, according to Oricon, were Arashi, with ¥14.46 billion and Exile.

=== Albums ===
The following is a list of the top 10 best-selling albums in Japan in 2009, according to Oricon. The best-selling album of the year, All the Best! 1999–2009, sold more than 1.43 million copies.

Rank	Album	Artist
1	All the Best! 1999–2009	Arashi
2	Supermarket Fantasy	Mr. Children
3	Shio, Koshō	Greeeen
4	Aisubeki Mirai e	Exile
5	Exile Ballad Best	Exile
6	Ayaka's History 2006–2009	Ayaka
7	Do You Dreams Come True?	Dreams Come True
8	Remio Best	Remioromen
9	Box Emotions	Superfly
10	Calling	Kobukuro

== Albums released ==
The following section includes albums by Japanese artists released in Japan in 2009 as well as Japanese-language albums by foreign artists released in the country during this year.

- January 14 – Camouflage by Merzbow
- January 21 - Shin-shiro by Sakanaction
- January 28 - Trick by Koda Kumi
- January 28 – 4 Akogare My Star by Cute
- January 28 – 5 by Flow
- February 4 - 428: Fūsa Sareta Shibuya de Original Soundtrack by Hideki Sakamoto and Naoki Satō
- February 4 – Antenna by GO!GO!7188
- March 4 – Kyūtai by MUCC
- March 9 – Remio Best by Remioromen
- March 17 – Hayley Sings Japanese Songs 2 by Hayley Westenra
- March 18 – Akiko Infinity Kokia: Balance by Kokia
- March 18 – Harmonia by Akiko Shikata
- March 18 – Kokia Infinity Akiko: Balance by Kokia
- March 21 – Do You Dreams Come True? by Dreams Come True
- March 25 – Next Level by Ayumi Hamasaki
- May 27 – Dream by Yuna Ito
- May 27 – Family by May J.
- June 10 – Shio, Koshō by Greeeen
- June 24 – Hocus Pocus by Kaela Kimura
- July 15 – Fight by Mayumi Iizuka
- August 5 – Calling by Kobukuro
- August 19 – All the Best! 1999–2009 by Arashi
- September 2 – Box Emotions by Superfly
- September 9 -Emotions by Thelma Aoyama
- September 16 - Best Ai by Ai
- September 23 – Ayaka's History 2006–2009 by Ayaka
- October 21 – Best Scandal by Scandal
- November 11 - Canaan Inspired Album by Faylan and Annabel
- November 25 – Aurora by Nico Touches the Walls
- November 25 - Canaan Original Sound Track: Ai by Hikaru Nanase
- December 2 – Aisubeki Mirai e by Exile
- December 9 – Carol by Chara
- December 9 – I Am by Mao Denda
- December 16 – Past<Future by Namie Amuro
- December 23 – Anime's Compilation Best by Kotoko
- December 23 – Hajimari no Uta by Ikimono-gakari
- 13 Japanese Birds by Merzbow

== Groups established ==
- Angerme
- bump.y
- ClariS
- Flower
- Gacharic Spin
- Oldcodex
- Passepied
- Passpo
- SDN48
- Shiritsu Ebisu Chugaku
- Sphere
- YuiKaori

== Groups disestablished ==
- BeForU
- Bleach
- GAM
- Kuroyume
- Two-Mix

== Deaths ==
- Jasmine You dies on August 9.

== See also ==
- 2009 in Japan
- 2009 in Japanese television
- List of Japanese films of 2009
