= Music of 428: Shibuya Scramble and Canaan =

Music of the video game 428: Shibuya Scramble and the TV series Canaan

428: Shibuya Scramble is a visual novel video game developed by Chunsoft and published by Sega. The game was released in 2008, and spawned the sequel anime series Canaan, created by Type-Moon and animated by P.A. Works and aired in 2009. The music of 428: Shibuya Scramble and Canaan spans two soundtrack albums, four singles, and one character song album.

The soundtrack of 428 was primarily composed by Hideki Sakamoto and Naoki Satō, with 9 tracks done by guest composer Shingo Yasumoto. The soundtrack is varied in genre and style, which Sakamato said provided the composition process with several obstacles. The music was released on a soundtrack album by the label Lantis on February 4, 2009, with three discs and 73 tracks. J-pop artist Aya Kamiki performed the theme song to 428, "Sekai wa Sore demo Kawari wa Shinai", a rock song that describes positivity despite an unchanging world.

The music of Canaan, consisting of 101 tracks, was headed primarily by Hikaru Nanase. A three-disc soundtrack album, titled Ai, was released by Lantis on November 25, 2009. The opening and ending themes to Canaan were both of their artists' major debut singles, released by Lantis. The opening "Mind as Judgement" is a rock song by Faylan, whilst the ending theme is the contrasting, calm ballad piece "My Heaven" by Annabel. Annabel and Faylan also collaborated on an album of Canaan character songs, titled Canaan Inspired Album. Voice actress Ayahi Takagaki, as the character Nene, provided Canaan with three insert songs, which were released on a single for the lead track "China Kibun de High Tension!".

The discographies of 428 and Canaan have received positive response. The soundtrack of 428 was praised by video game and video game music critics, whereas the OST of Canaan was enjoyed by anime reviewers, who also positively noted "Mind as Judgement". Commercially, 428's soundtrack peaked at No. 131 on the Oricon Albums Chart; Canaan's did not chart. "Sekai wa Sore demo Kawari wa Shinai" peaked at No. 42 on the Singles Chart; "My Heaven" and "China Kibun de High Tension!" appeared on the 60s of the chart, whilst "Mind as Judgement" broke into the top 20.

== Releases ==
=== 428: Shibuya Scramble ===
428: Fūsa Sareta Shibuya de Original Soundtrack

Soundtrack album by Hideki Sakamoto and Naoki Satō
- Released: February 4, 2009
- Studio: Sound Inn (Tokyo)
- Genre: Video game music
- Length: 2:04:58
- Label: Lantis
- Producer: Natsuki Sugaya

428: Shibuya Scramble's soundtrack, 428: Fūsa Sareta Shibuya de Original Soundtrack, (Note: 428: Fūsa Sareta Shibuya de Orijinaru Saundotorakku (Japanese: 「428～封鎖された渋谷で～」オリジナルサウンドトラック; lit. "428: In a Blockaded Shibuya Original Soundtrack")) was released in Japan by Lantis on February 4, 2009, with the catalogue code LACA-9141～2. The soundtrack album was headed by Hideki Sakamoto – a video game music "veteran" – and Naoki Satō, noted by RPGFan as a composer with experience within film and anime. Produced by Natsuki Sugaya at Sound Inn Studios, the CD album release contained two discs with 73 songs, and a total length of 2:04:58–1:14:15 from the first disc's 46 tracks and 50:43 from the second disc's 27. Work was divided between Sakamoto and Satō on the first disc; the second disc was headed by Sakamoto alone, though with tracks 10–18 done by guest composer Shingo Yasumoto. Sakamoto also covered the second-disc song "Letter" with his band, Hideki Sakamoto Trio, on their eponymous debut album.

The soundtrack of 428 features a variety of themes, instrumentation, and genres. The eponymous main theme is a jazz piece with heavy use of horns, whereas the final nine tracks are composed with string instruments in an acoustic motif. Comparing the soundtrack with his work on Castlevania Judgment, Sakamoto expressed in an interview that there were more unique obstacles during the production of 428. He attributed this to the varied amount of styles, recalling that genres such as techno, funk, and classical were also featured throughout the OST.

The album made its one appearance on the weekly Oricon Albums Chart on February 16, 2009, charting at No. 131 with 1,121 documented sales. The soundtrack received a nomination for Best Score — Western Localisation at Video Game Music Online's 2018 Annual Game Music Awards, but was eliminated before the runner-up. Bob Richardson reviewed the soundtrack for RPGFan. He praised the mixture of genres and instruments, commenting that the tracklist would have something suitable for most listeners. Richardson did observe that the variation could lead to disunion between neighboring tracks, but brushed this off as a "small price to pay for a set of phenomenal individual pieces." Richardson positively noted Sakamoto, Satō, and Yasumoto's work on the soundtrack and praised their cooperation, but particularly called the last nine tracks, done by Sakamoto in a "deeper" classical style, among the best pieces featured. The music was also praised by game critics.

Disc 1
No.	Title	Music	Japanese title (romanization)	Length
1.	"Main Theme"	Naoki Satō	「428 ～封鎖された渋谷で～」Main Theme (428: Fūsa Sareta Shibuya de Main Theme)	2:06
2.	"Setup"	Satō	セットアップ (Settoappu)	1:44
3.	"Shinya Kanou"	Satō	加納慎也 (Kanō Shinya)	1:45
4.	"Pursuit"	Satō	追跡 (Tsuiseki)	1:44
5.	"Powerless"	Satō	無力 (Muryoku)	1:34
6.	"Conflict"	Satō	葛藤 (Kattō)	1:19
7.	"Verification"	Hideki Sakamoto	検証 (Kenshō)	1:47
8.	"Relaxation"	Sakamoto	弛緩 (Shikan)	1:44
9.	"Tension"	Sakamoto	緊張 (Kinchō)	1:27
10.	"Mystery"	Sakamoto	推理 (Suiri)	1:48
11.	"Decision"	Sakamoto	決意 (Ketsui)	2:03
12.	"Achi Endou"	Satō	遠藤亜智 (Endō Achi)	1:03
13.	"Hitomi Osawa"	Satō	大沢ひとみ (Ōsawa Hitomi)	1:37
14.	"Escape"	Satō	逃走 (Tōsō)	1:07
15.	"Echo"	Satō	残響 (Zankyō)	1:54
16.	"On the Move"	Sakamoto	出動 (Shutsudō)	1:56
17.	"Confusion"	Sakamoto	狂宴 (Kyōhen)	1:28
18.	"Contemplation"	Sakamoto	反芻 (Hansū)	1:29
19.	"Optimism"	Sakamoto	楽天 (Rakuten)	1:21
20.	"Pressure"	Sakamoto	切迫 (Seppaku)	1:51
21.	"Tama"	Satō	タマ (Tama)	1:16
22.	"Game"	Unknown	遊戯 (Yūgi)	1:17
23.	"Fatigue"	Sakamoto	脱力 (Datsuryoku)	1:32
24.	"Eggplant"	Sakamoto	茄子 (Nasubi)	2:05
25.	"Minoru Minorikawa"	Satō	御法川実 (Minorikawa Minoru)	1:33
26.	"Cigarette Smoke"	Satō	紫煙 (Shien)	1:29
27.	"Best"	Sakamoto	上々 (Jōjō)	1:46
28.	"Impatience"	Sakamoto	焦燥 (Shōsō)	1:20
29.	"Yum Cha"	Sakamoto	飲茶 (Yamucha)	1:38
30.	"Gun Salute"	Sakamoto	祝砲 (Shukuhō)	0:16
31.	"Kenji Osawa"	Satō	大沢賢治 (Ōsawa Kenji)	1:35
32.	"Ua Virus"	Satō	ウーアウィルス (Ūa Wirusu)	1:32
33.	"Lost in Thought"	Satō	沈思黙考 (Chinshi Mokkō)	1:33
34.	"Frenzy"	Satō	狂乱 (Kyōran)	0:53
35.	"Toilet"	Satō	雪隠 (Secchin)	1:07
36.	"Presentiment"	Sakamoto	予兆 (Yochō)	2:06
37.	"Circumstances"	Sakamoto	事態 (Jitai)	1:39
38.	"Devotion"	Sakamoto	真心 (Magokoro)	2:28
39.	"Implications"	Sakamoto	包容 (Hōyō)	2:24
40.	"Despair"	Sakamoto	絶望 (Zetsubō)	1:44
41.	"Pride"	Sakamoto	矜持 (Kyōji)	2:09
42.	"The Shibuya Lockdown"	Satō	渋谷封鎖 (Shibuya Fūsa)	1:30
43.	"Alphard"	Satō	アルファルド (Arufarudo)	1:18
44.	"Chance Meeting"	Satō	邂逅 (Kaikō)	1:34
45.	"Hope"	Satō	希望 (Kibō)	2:03
46.	"Coming Back Alive"	Satō	生還 (Seikan)	1:44

Disc 2
No.	Title	Music	Japanese title (romanization)	Length
1.	"Unrest"	Sakamoto	不穏 (Fuon)	1:42
2.	"Doubt"	Sakamoto	疑惑 (Giwaku)	1:20
3.	"Maneuvers"	Sakamoto	蠢動 (Shundō)	1:14
4.	"Violation"	Sakamoto	侵食 (Shinshoku)	1:32
5.	"Dread"	Sakamoto	恐怖 (Kyōfu)	1:37
6.	"Slump"	Sakamoto	転落 (Tenraku)	1:36
7.	"Abrupt Ending"	Sakamoto	尻切 (Shirikire)	1:31
8.	"Vertigo"	Sakamoto	眩暈 (Genun)	0:55
9.	"Chaos"	Sakamoto	混乱 (Konran)	0:57
10.	"Omen"	Shingo Yasumoto	omen	2:49
11.	"Journey"	Yasumoto	journey	2:28
12.	"Recollect"	Yasumoto	recollect	1:29
13.	"Forward"	Yasumoto	forward	1:24
14.	"Tension"	Yasumoto	tension	2:18
15.	"Crisis"	Yasumoto	crisis	1:47
16.	"Cartridge"	Yasumoto	cartridge	2:50
17.	"Parting"	Yasumoto	parting	2:58
18.	"Rise"	Yasumoto	rise	3:02
19.	"Spring Breeze" (Piano Solo)	Sakamoto	春の風 (Haru no Kaze)	1:43
20.	"A Bell That Doesn't Ring"	Sakamoto	鳴らない鈴 (Naranai Suzu)	0:42
21.	"Spring Breeze"	Sakamoto	春の風 (Haru no Kaze)	1:46
22.	"Sunny Favorite"	Sakamoto	日あたり良好 (Hiatari Ryōkō)	1:45
23.	"Secret"	Sakamoto	秘密 (Himitsu)	1:55
24.	"Fleeting Romance"	Sakamoto	淡恋 (Awakoi)	2:18
25.	"Lingering Heart"	Sakamoto	さまよう心 (Samayou Kokoro)	0:59
26.	"Letter"	Sakamoto	手紙 (Tegami)	3:24
27.	"Spring Breeze, A Bell That Doesn't Ring"	Sakamoto	春の風、鳴らない鈴 (Haru no Kaze, Naranai Suzu)	2:42
Total length:				2:04:58

==== "Sekai wa Sore demo Kawari wa Shinai" ====
The main theme to 428: Shibuya Scramble is the song "Sekai wa Sore demo Kawari wa Shinai", performed by rock singer Aya Kamiki. Composed by Aika Ōno, the song begins with a strings-based intro before transitioning into a rock style. The lyrics emphasizes positive towards the tomorrow, after initially opening with a bleak description of an unchanging world. The song was released by Giza Studio on December 3, 2008, marking Kamiki's 10th single. "Sekai wa Sore demo Kawari wa Shinai" received a marketing campaign alongside 428, named "428 × Aya Kamiki" Shibuya Jack, which included billboards, the song's usage as background music in public areas, and live performances. A music video was released on a web page for Kamiki and Chunsoft's collaboration, featuring characters from 428 traversing a nighttime Shibuya. It reached No. 42 on the Oricon Singles Chart, with 4,378 total documented sales during its three weeks on the chart.

=== Canaan ===
Canaan; Original Sound Track: Ai

Soundtrack album by Hikaru Nanase
- Released: November 25, 2009
- Length: 3:41:02
- Label: Lantis

Canaan Original Sound Track: Ai (Note: Canaan Original Sound Track: Ai (Japanese: CANAAN Original sound Track「アイ」; lit. "Canaan Original Soundtrack: Eye" or "Love")) is the soundtrack album to Canaan, released by Lantis in Japan on November 25, 2009, with the catalogue code LACA-9172～4. The score was composed almost solely by Masumi Itō under her pseudonym Hikaru Nanase, and includes 101 tracks across three discs, with a total length of 3:41:02–1:14:49 from disc one, 1:12:57 from disc two, and 1:13:16 from disc three. Outside Nanase's pieces, the soundtrack includes shorter versions of lyrical themes from the show: the ending theme "My Heaven" by Annabel is included on the first disc, and the insert song "Life" by Ayahi Takagaki and the opening theme "Mind as Judgement" by Faylan are included on the third disc. The full versions of the themes were released on singles outside the soundtrack.

The soundtrack did not appear on the Oricon Albums Chart. Anime News Network writers Theron Martin and Luke Carroll both touched on Canaan's soundtrack during their reviews of the series. Carroll praised a fitting ambiance during tense and action scenes. Martin agreed, and also complimented the score for its subtler tracks, but felt that it would "[push] things" too far on occasion. Carroll summarized the music as "decent" whereas Martin called it a strong musical score. Both reviewers rated the soundtrack an A−.

All music is composed by Hikaru Nanase, except where otherwise noted.

Disc 1
No.	Title	Japanese title	Length
1.	"Hajimaru Monogatari"	始まる物語	2:02
2.	"Shanghai no Machi de"	上海の街で	1:25
3.	"Tozasareta Hitomi"	閉ざされた瞳	1:58
4.	"Unbloom"	unbloom	0:58
5.	"Kyōkankaku to wa"	共感覚とは―	1:48
6.	"Totsuzen no Deai"	突然の出会い	2:08
7.	"Kirenai Ito"	切れないイト	2:22
8.	"Sorasareta Hitomi"	逸らされた瞳	1:58
9.	"Kyōkankaku Hatsudō"	共感覚発動	1:47
10.	"Tetsu no Tōsō Daikōjin"	鉄の闘争代行人	2:42
11.	"Ninmu no Kanryō"	任務の完了	0:39
12.	"Itsuwari no Kyūshutsu-geki"	偽りの救出劇	1:42
13.	"Mino-san to Maria"	みのさんとマリア	1:56
14.	"Shi no Hana"	死の花	1:20
15.	"Kinchōkan Nashi"	緊張感ナシ	1:52
16.	"Kodoku na Yoru"	孤独な夜	0:46
17.	"Okiraku Freeter"	お気楽フリーター	1:12
18.	"Crazy Taxi"	クレイジータクシー	2:37
19.	"Canaan no Sentōryoku"	カナンの戦闘力	1:18
20.	"Ikigurushī Sekai"	イキグルシイセカイ	2:01
21.	"Gekka Bijin"	月下美人	0:25
22.	"My Heaven" (TV Size) (composed by Myu, with vocals from Annabel)	My heaven	1:35
23.	"Siam"	シャム	2:01
24.	"Anyaku suru Jikan"	暗躍する時間	1:51
25.	"Futsū no Shōjō"	普通の少女	0:42
26.	"Canaan to Date"	カナンとデート	1:06
27.	"Canaan no Kyōgū"	カナンの境遇	2:22
28.	"Minorikawa Minoru ni Mebaeta Mono"	御法川 実に芽生えたもの	0:51
29.	"Shōjō kara Tetsu no Tōsō Daikōjin e"	少女から鉄の闘争代行人へ	5:56
30.	"Kyozetsu no Iro"	拒絶の色	0:44
31.	"Kure Nazumu"	呉れ泥む	5:50
32.	"Jūnihitoe?"	十二単?	2:15
33.	"Canaan no Shōsō"	カナンの焦燥	0:38
34.	"Umaku wa Arimasen"	うまくはありません	0:46
35.	"Utsukushiki Kyōki"	美しき狂気	0:41
36.	"Santana no Yasashisa"	サンタナの優しさ	0:58
37.	"Maria Jiseki no Nen"	マリア 自責の念	2:16
38.	"Party no Jikan"	パーティの時間	1:06
39.	"Doro no Yō darō?"	泥の様だろう？	2:48
40.	"Hebi no Na o Motsu Soshiki"	蛇の名を持つ組織	1:16
41.	"Yunyun to Danran"	ユンユンとの団欒	1:45
42.	"Shikei Senkoku no Kotoba"	死刑宣告の言葉	0:52
43.	"Dōkyō Dōshi"	同郷同士	1:33

Disc 2
No.	Title	Japanese title	Length
1.	"Kodomo no Kenka"	コドモのケンカ	1:38
2.	"Sorezore no Kanashimi"	それぞれの悲しみ	1:53
3.	"Yuragu Tōsō Daikōjin"	揺らぐ闘争代行人	1:28
4.	"Tomo Dachi"	灯ダチ	1:58
5.	"Minorikawa Minoru no Suiri"	御法川 実の推理	0:56
6.	"Kyō Itoshī"	狂愛しい	1:18
7.	"Minorikawa Minoru no Tsuikyū"	御法川 実の追及	1:31
8.	"Love & Piece"	LOVE&PIECE	1:04
9.	"Liang Pi no Theme"	リャン・ピーのテーマ	0:37
10.	"Kore wa Ninmu Janai"	これは任務じゃない	1:50
11.	"Liang Ji no Gekijō"	リャン・チーの激情	2:41
12.	"Ua Virus Hasshō"	ウーアウィルス発症	1:24
13.	"Haritsumeteiru Mono"	張り詰めているもの	4:57
14.	"Shizuka naru Kyōki"	静かなる狂気	4:20
15.	"Saigo made Agake"	最後まで足掻け	0:58
16.	"Kyōkankaku Zenkai"	共感覚全開	4:47
17.	"Ushinawareteiku Iro"	喪われていくイロ	2:18
18.	"Iya Yume"	嫌夢	0:46
19.	"Ayausugiru Tsūshin"	危うすぎる通信	1:58
20.	"Hakko no Nōryoku"	ハッコーの能力	1:11
21.	"Minorikawa Minoru no Ketsui"	御法川 実の決意	1:43
22.	"Tsuka no Ma no Ichiji"	束の間の一時	0:40
23.	"Canaan no Soba ni..."	カナンのそばに…	2:12
24.	"Me no Mae ni Aru Genkyō"	目の前にある元凶	3:10
25.	"Silk Road Manjū"	シルクロード饅頭	0:24
26.	"Kitte Sutero"	斬って捨てろ	1:19
27.	"Me o Tojite no Sentō"	目を閉じての戦闘	2:22
28.	"Kikyō suru Omoi"	帰郷する想い	0:59
29.	"Kesareta Mura"	消された村	5:13
30.	"Datte Datte Ai Nan daro?"	だってだって愛なんだろ?	2:08
31.	"Futari no Canaan"	二人のCANAAN	4:05
32.	"Santana to Hakko no Deai"	サンタナとハッコーの出会い	0:51
33.	"Norowashiki Hanazono"	呪わしき花園	2:48
34.	"Giman, Giman, Giman"	欺瞞、欺瞞、欺瞞	5:30

Disc 3
No.	Title	Japanese title	Length
1.	"Hiai"	悲愛	3:22
2.	"Soushitsu"	想執	3:13
3.	"Hanazono Shinnyū"	花園侵入	2:09
4.	"Kibō no Zangai"	キボウの残骸	0:55
5.	"Natsume no Omowaku"	夏目の思惑	4:19
6.	"See-Saw"	彼女添	6:00
7.	"Itsuwari no Canaan"	偽りのカナン	5:50
8.	"Kettei-ken no Arika"	決定権の在処	2:25
9.	"Hakkō"	薄幸	2:10
10.	"Tadaima"	タダイマ	1:33
11.	"Tsukiyo no Sanpo"	月夜の散歩	2:07
12.	"Issho nara..."	一緒なら…	3:11
13.	"Kisetsu Ressha"	忌殺劣者	6:23
14.	"Tada, Ari no Mama o"	ただ、ありのままを	1:09
15.	"Alphard"	アルファルド	8:35
16.	"Kage o Tsukurenai"	影を作れない	0:51
17.	"Subete o Ari no Mama ni"	全てをありのままに	3:24
18.	"Kibō to Kodoku"	希望と孤独	2:59
19.	"Kodoku kara no Kotae"	孤独からのコタエ	1:15
20.	"Karamaru Ito"	からまるイト	0:56
21.	"Osonae wa Manjū de..."	お供えは饅頭で…	1:00
22.	"Tayori Sou Kokoro"	頼り添う心	3:09
23.	"Life" (composed and written by Yozuca, with vocals from Ayahi Takagaki)	LIFE	4:45
24.	"Mind as Judgement" (TV Size) (composed by Noriyasu Agematsu and written by Aki Hata, with vocals from Faylan)	mind as Judgement	1:36
Total length:			3:41:02

==== "Mind as Judgement" ====
"Mind as Judgement"

Single by Faylan
- Language: Japanese
- B-side: "Utakata no Kotori tachi"
- Released: July 22, 2009
- Genre: Rock; j-pop
- Length: 3:56
- Label: Lantis
- Composer: Noriyasu Agematsu
- Lyricist: Aki Hata

Faylan singles chronology
"Gekka no Rasen" (2007)	"Mind as Judgement" (2009)	"I Sing By My Soul" (2009)

"Mind as Judgement" (Note: Stylized as "mind as Judgement".) is the opening theme to Canaan. It is the major debut by singer Faylan, and was released as a single by Lantis in Japan on July 22, 2009, with the catalogue number LACM-4630. Written by Aki Hata with composition from Noriyasu Agematsu, "Mind as Judgement" is a rock song, contrasting to the calmer ending theme "My Heaven". The single includes "Mind as Judgement", the B-side "Utakata no Kotori tachi", and instrumental versions of the tracks.

The song entered the Oricon Singles Chart at No. 14 with 5,638 sales. It charted for 12 consecutive weeks, and had reached 15,016 documented sales by October 19, its final week on the chart. Theron Martin and Luke Carroll praised "Mind as Judgement" in their reviews of Canaan. Martin wrote that the song kick starts episodes with "intense" rock, and also complimented the opening's animation in the series. Carroll also praised the song for providing Canaan with a high-action opening. Both reviewers noted the polarizing themes between "Mind as Judgement" and "My Heaven".

"Mind as Judgement" has been performed live by Faylan on multiple occasions and has been included in various albums. Altered versions have been included in Canaan related albums: a ballad cover by Faylan was the lead track of Canaan Inspired Album, and a short version of the song was recorded as the final track of the Canaan soundtrack album. The song was performed at Faylan's Happy Soul Dance tour; the performance was later included in the DVD for the early edition of Faylan's second album Alive (2011). Faylan performed the song live on the first day of the 2019 Lantis Festival. The same year, "Mind as Judgement" was featured as the lead track of Faylan's 10th anniversary album, Mind as Rock! In 2021, alongside "My Heaven", the song was recorded in the first disc of an anime theme song album celebrating the 20th anniversary of P.A. Works.

All lyrics are written by Aki Hata.

No.	Title	Music	Japanese title	Length
1.	"Mind as Judgement"	Noriyasu Agematsu	mind as Judgement	3:56
2.	"Utakata no Kotori tachi"	Shunryū	泡沫の小鳥達	4:43
3.	"Mind as Judgement" (Off Vocal)	Agematsu	mind as Judgement	3:55
4.	"Utakata no Kotori tachi" (Off Vocal)	Shunryū	泡沫の小鳥達	4:42
Total length:				17:16

==== "My Heaven" ====
"My Heaven"

Single by Annabel
- Language: Japanese
- B-side: "Filum"
- Released: August 26, 2009
- Genre: J-pop
- Length: 4:40
- Label: Lantis
- Composer: Myu
- Lyricist: Aki Hata

Annabel singles chronology
"My Heaven" (2009)	"Light of Dawn" (2009)

"My Heaven" (Note: Stylized in sentence case.) is the ending theme to Canaan. It is the debut single by singer Annabel, and was released by Lantis in Japan with the catalogue number LACM-4635 on September 26, 2009, featuring the titular track, the B-side "Filum", and off vocal versions of the songs; the TV length version of the song was released on the first disc of the Canaan soundtrack album. Composed by Myu of the band Kukui with lyrics by Aki Hata, "My Heaven" features a calmer, ballad style, in comparison to the action-themed rock opening "Mind as Judgement".

The single debuted at No. 67 on the Oricon charts, with 1,571 sales; it stayed on the chart for one more week, reaching a total of 1,956 sales. "My Heaven" was included in the first disc of a 2021 P.A. Works anime theme song album, alongside "Mind as Judgement", in commemoration of the company's 20th anniversary.

All music is composed by Myu.

No.	Title	Lyrics	Length
1.	"My Heaven"	Aki Hata	4:40
2.	"Filum"	Annabel	4:25
3.	"My Heaven" (Off Vocal)	Hata	4:40
4.	"Filum" (Off Vocal)	Annabel	4:22
Total length:			18:07

==== "China Kibun de High Tension!" ====
"China Kibun de High Tension!"

Single by Nene
- Language: Japanese
- Released: October 7, 2009
- Genre: J-pop
- Length: 4:36
- Label: Lantis
- Composer: Shunryū
- Lyricist: Mari Okada

"China Kibun de High Tension!" (Note: Chaina Kibun de Hai Tenshon! (Japanese: チャイナ気分でハイテンション!; lit. "High Tension in the Energy of China!")) is a single by Japanese actress Ayahi Takagaki, sung as the Canaan character Nene. The single consists of three insert songs from Canaan – the eponymous lead track, "Inochi Nan da yo", and "Life" – and their instrumental versions. It was issued by Lantis in Japan on October 7, 2009, under the catalogue number LACM-4653. "Life" received a rerelease on the third disc of Canaan's soundtrack in November. The song reached No. 62 on the Oricon chart, which recorded 1,442 sales during its two appearances.

No.	Title	Lyrics	Music	Japanese title	Length
1.	"China Kibun de High Tension!"	Mari Okada	Shunryū	チャイナ気分でハイテンション!	4:36
2.	"Inochi Nan da yo"	Okada	Shunryū	いのちなんだよ	5:20
3.	"Life"	Yozuca	Yozuca	LIFE	4:43
4.	"China Kibun de High Tension!" (Off Vocal)	Okada	Shunryū	チャイナ気分でハイテンション!	4:36
5.	"Inochi Nan da yo" (Off Vocal)	Okada	Shunryū	いのちなんだよ	5:20
6.	"Life" (Off Vocal)	Yozuca	Yozuca	LIFE	4:40
Total length:					29:15

==== Canaan Inspired Album ====
Canaan Inspired Album

Studio album by Faylan and Annabel
- Released: November 11, 2009
- Length: 49:36
- Language: Japanese
- Label: Lantis

Canaan Inspired Album is an album by Faylan and Annabel, released in Japan by Lantis on November 11, 2009, with the catalogue number LACA-5969. The album consists of ten Canaan-themed songs: nine lyrical character themes and a ballad version of "Mind as Judgement". The album features composition from Masumi Itō, Myu, and Elements Garden members Noriyasu Agematsu, Hitoshi Fujima, and Masato Nakayama, and lyrics from Annabel, Aki Hata, and Yozuca.

No.	Title	Lyrics	Music	Vocals	Length
1.	"Mind as Judgement: Ballad"	Aki Hata	Noriyasu Agematsu	Faylan	5:14
2.	"Kibō no Chi"	Annabel	Hikaru Nanase	Annabel	4:52
3.	"My Real"	Yozuca	Nanase	Faylan	4:30
4.	"Synesthesia"	Annabel	Myu	Annabel	6:58
5.	"Hishō no Koku"	Yozuca	Hitoshi Fujima	Faylan	4:57
6.	"Yawaraka na Hikari no Naka de"	Annabel	Myu	Annabel	4:47
7.	"Day of the Fate"	Yozuca	Masato Nakayama	Faylan	4:08
8.	"Ai no Kotoba"	Annabel	Myu	Annabel	5:20
9.	"Kibō no Sora"	Yozuca	Nakayama	Faylan	4:59
10.	"Shanghai Biyori"	Annabel	Myu	Annabel	3:51
Total length:					49:36

==== Other releases ====
A different song by Faylan, "Arousing Soul", was bundled with a Canaan promotional DVD at the December 2008 Comiket convention.

A Canaan radio CD was released by Frontier Works on December 23, 2009, titled Canaan DJCD ~ Shanghai Hanten de Aimashō. (Note: Canaan DJCD ~ Shanghai Hanten de Aimashō (Japanese: 「CANAAN」DJCD～上海飯店で会いましょう; lit. "Let's Meet at Shanghai Hotel")) A second CD was released on February 24, 2010. The radio is set within the universe of Canaan, and features "high-tension conversations", different from the serious tone of the anime.
