= Individual Emotion =

Studio album by Aya Kamiki
- Released: January 27, 2010
- Length: 1:20:01
- Label: Avex Trax

Aya Kamiki chronology
Are you happy now? (2010)	Individual Emotion (2010)	Gloriosa (2010)

Limited edition 2-CD cover

Singles from Individual Emotion
- 1. "W-B-X ~W-Boiled Extreme~" Released: November 11, 2009

Individual Emotion is a Japanese music album by Aya Kamiki. Aya Kamiki's fourth album and her first under her new label Avex Trax, released simultaneously alongside her first greatest hits album Aya Kamiki Greatest Best. The only single from the album is "W-B-X ~W-Boiled Extreme~", the opening theme song for Kamen Rider W. The first disc, included in the standard and limited edition releases, is a regular studio album. The second disc, only included with the limited edition releases, is a compilation of several non-album B-sides and album only tracks selected by Kamiki's fans.

== Track listing ==
All lyrics are written by Aya Kamiki except "W-B-X ~W-Boiled Extreme~", originally written by Shoko Fujibayashi.

Disc 1
No.	Title	Music	Length
1.	"introduction ～INDIVIDUAL EMOTION～"	tasuku	1:27
2.	"The Light"	Shintaro Mizuno, Chikara Hazama, tasuku	4:16
3.	"TO-THE-ATTACK"	Junpei Takada	3:15
4.	"EMPTY"	Miki Watabe	4:27
5.	"Break my day"	Siyon Morishita, A. Kamiki	3:59
6.	"Dear my..."	Yusuke Kato	4:20
7.	"sokubaku LOVE"	Kazunori Watanabe	3:35
8.	"CLAP YOUR HANDS"	Kazuhiro Hara	3:10
9.	"248 Mile"	Osamu Sasaki, Hiroshi Hibino	3:43
10.	"I wish in your dreams"	K. Hara	3:13
11.	"W-B-X ~W-Boiled Extreme~" (as "Aya Kamiki w TAKUYA")	Shuhei Naruse	3:19
Total length:			38:38

Disc 2 (Limited edition only)
No.	Title	Music	Length
1.	"Sekaijū no Dare mo ga (世界中の誰もが; lit. "Everyone Throughout the World")" (Ashita no Tame ni ~Forever More~)	Aika Ohno, Takeshi Hayama	4:32
2.	"I'm your side" ("Summer Memories")	Hitoshi Okamoto	3:19
3.	"Can't stop fallin' in LOVE" (Secret Code)	Miki Fujisue, S. Morishita	3:19
4.	"Crash" (Are you happy now?)	Munetaka Kawamoto, Hiroshi Asai	4:15
5.	"youthful diary" ("Misekake no I Love you")	H. Okamoto	3:57
6.	"Whenever you're gone Today" ("Kimi Sarishi Yūwaku")	H. Okamoto	3:44
7.	"It's a beautiful day" (Are you happy now?)	H. Okamoto	3:59
8.	"EVER SO SWEET" ("Sekai wa Sore Demo Kawari wa Shinai")	H. Okamoto, H. Asai	5:15
9.	"Friends (フレンズ, Furenzu)" (Secret Code)	A. Ohno, T. Hayama	5:28
10.	"Shoo Be Doo Bee Ba (☆シュビドゥビバ☆, Shubidubiba)" (Constellation)	Daria Kawashima	3:43
Total length:			41:23
