= List of Canaan episodes =

DVD Cover of CANAAN, Volume 1. Released in Japan.

The episodes of Canaan (stylized as CANAAN) are directed by Masahiro Ando and created under the direction of the Project CANAAN group with Kinoko Nasu being the scenario director P.A. Works did the animation for Canaan. The show officially broadcast its first episode on July 4, 2009 to September 26, 2009 on the AT-X, Chiba TV, Kansai TV, Tokai TV, Tokyo MX TV, TV Kanagawa and TV Saitama television stations.

Based on a bonus scenario created by Type-Moon for the game 428: Shibuya Scramble, Canaan's story is based on its eponymous protagonist. A Middle Eastern teenaged girl and a mercenary, Canaan is dispatched by her unknown superiors to the city of Shanghai in the People's Republic of China where she meets up with Maria Ōsawa. Now a photographer, Maria reunites with her friend Canaan after being saved from harassment during a trip to the Middle East years ago. Unknown to her, Maria suffers from partial amnesia since she had been the target of an attack by mysterious terrorists in Shibuya, Tokyo who planted with the Ua virus in her before her father Kenji was able to save her life by using an anti-Ua virus vaccine created by the Okoshi Pharmaceutical company. Their presence in Shanghai, however, has been greatly overshadowed by the upcoming NBCR International Anti-Terrorist Conference in the same city where Alphard, Canaan's hated rival, plans to stage a terrorist attack with her subordinates known as "Snakes".

The creation of Canaan was first announced in the November issue of Newtype magazine that 428: Shibuya Scramble would have an anime adaptation. The show's title was later officially announced on 428: Shibuya Scramble's official website with P.A. Works doing the animation. A 17-second commercial was later aired on the show's official website. Comp Ace magazine had announced on a flyer that its July issue will serialize Canaan's manga adaptation. Canaan is also scheduled to have a movie adaptation in October, in where all of its 13 episodes are compiled into one show. Canaan was released on Region 2 DVDs and in Blu-Rays on October 21, 2009, with the DVD being sold for ¥6,090 and the Blu-Ray for ¥7,140. As of 2012, there is no word about the Canaan OVAs.

The first two volumes of Canaan was released in the DVD and Blu-ray formats simultaneously on October 21 and on November 27, 2009. There were subsequent releases of Canaan on DVD and Blu-ray on November 29 and December 25 of 2009, followed by January 29, February 26 and March 17 of 2010. Canaan was released in a DVD/Blu-ray Collection for North America by Sentai Filmworks on October 26, 2010, for $69.98. A Complete Blu-Ray Collection by Sentai will be released on January 4, 2022.

The show's opening song, "mind as Judgment", is sung by Faylan with a single released on July 22, 2009. The ending song, "My heaven", is sung by Annabel with a single released on August 26, 2009. However, the opening song was not used in episode 11, See Saw. Episode 13, Land of Hope, did not have an opening song as well and "mind as Judgment" was used for the episode's ending song. A separate single, "China Feelin' High Tension" (チャイナ気分でハイテンション!, China Kibun de High Tension), was released on October 7, 2009 with the songs performed by Ayahi Takagaki, who played Nene in the series. An album, "CANAAN Inspired Album", was released on November 11, 2009, containing 10 tracks with the "mind as Judgment" ballad remix song. The Canaan OST was released on November 25, 2009, with 3 discs included.

== Episodes ==
No.	Title	Directed by	Written by	Original release date
1	"Evil, Flood-Colored City"; Transliteration: "Kōshoku mato" (Japanese: 洪色魔都)	Masahiro Andō	Mari Okada	July 4, 2009
Maria Ōsawa and Minoru Minorikawa are dispatched to Shanghai from Japan, two years after the events of 428: Shibuya Scramble, to cover the upcoming International Anti-Terrorism Conference in the city with various world leaders coming to attend the meeting. Canaan, a Middle Eastern teenaged mercenary, was in the city as well after meeting with the unknown female contact with information that her rival Alphard Al Sheya was captured and secretly detained in Karachi, Pakistan by covert operators of the CIA's Special Activities Division. When Maria comes to see an unknown man dead with the Ua virus, Canaan saves her from being assassinated by masked gunmen before she defeats the rest of them without alerting and panicking the public with heightened senses in synesthesia. Meanwhile, the CIA's SAD convoy comes under attack from an IED ambush while transporting Alphard in their custody.
2	"Worthless Games"; Transliteration: "Jakera yūgi" (Japanese: 邪気乱遊戯)	Yoshiyuki Asai	Mari Okada	July 11, 2009
Liang Qi and Cummings led an airborne attack against the CIA SAD convoy consisting of air-to-surface-missiles and GPMG gunfire in order to free Alphard from their custody. Minoru, in a flashback, remembers that his superiors requested him to train Maria in order to become a professional photographer after surviving the events in Shibuya. While eating dinner in Shanghai, Maria and Minoru are targeted by an unknown old man who resembled the official Minoru saw on television en route to the city. Canaan arrives on the scene to save the two reporters from the Mini-Uzi-wielding man, before she was targeted for death by the man himself. He then dies by electrocution. The two reporters were later kicked out of their hotel room due to the mess created by unknown men. Minoru later contemplated about the mysterious T-shaped purple mark he saw from the old man and a corpse found from the festival he visited a day earlier.
3	"Trivialities"; Transliteration: "Adagoto" (Japanese: 阿断事)	Heo Jong	Mari Okada	July 18, 2009
Deciding to take a lead in the T-shaped purple mark Minoru saw recently, he and Maria visited a Japanese-themed bar to ask a woman before he is stopped by the establishment's bartender. Meanwhile, Alphard began to make plans for an unknown event while Liang Qi is irritated over Alphard's ignorance for her to attack Canaan right away. Canaan later was able to visit Maria with the help of her synesthesia-based abilities despite that she and Minoru were forced to stay in a run-down apartment. Maria and Canaan later decide to take a tour around Shanghai, the two of them visiting the Bund Sightseeing Tunnel when Canaan was lured away from the tram to check on a supposed trap before running back to see Maria missing. Canaan fights against a young boy who told her that he is a Borner due to his mysterious ability after being infected with the Ua virus, which in case gave him the ability to hide in narrow passages. Canaan killed him with a well-placed shot in the body to obtain the detonator for the explosive placed on Maria's head after she was restrained.
4	"Lingering Sunset"; Transliteration: "Kurenazumu" (Japanese: 呉れ泥む)	Toshiyuki Yahagi	Mari Okada	July 25, 2009
Canaan remembers why she wanted to take down Alphard while removing the bullet head from her left arm sustained from being shot in the tunnels of the Bund Sightseeing Tunnel. Maria later has PTSD over the events of her detention and rescue by Canaan, not knowing that Canaan is really an armed mercenary and assassin for real and not the girl she knew from years ago. Alphard, with Liang Qi and Cummings, attend a public function dedicated to the upcoming NBCR International Anti-Terrorism Conference with the selection of the Daedala Corporation, a Private military company that has the Chinese government as its major client to assist Chinese security forces in safeguarding diplomats for the upcoming conference with Cummings as the public head of the company. In a public toilet, Canaan confronts Alphard privately with the latter taunting her for her failure to protect Siam from getting killed years ago. Canaan later flees when Alphard fires her FN Five-Seven USG at the sprinklers.
5	"Friends"; Transliteration: "Tomodachi" (Japanese: 灯ダチ)	Takefumi Anzai	Mari Okada	August 1, 2009
Maria stays with a girl named Yunyun in her personal houseboat a day after she wanders off in an alleyway without Canaan. Yunyun is later summoned by Liang Qi with a mission assigned to her. Maria and Minoru later investigate the T-shaped marks with the assistance of Japanese physicians back in Japan to study them and find out what has caused them for themselves. Canaan later meets Yunyun embarrassingly as part of the latter's mission is to get rid of her. Despite pleas from Maria, Canaan and Yunyun continue to face off against each other unsuccessfully with a plan by Yunyun to kill herself and Canaan with dynamite mounted throughout her entire body before Canaan decides to save the girl out of pity for Maria since she is her only friend. Back in Maria and Minoru's rented apartment room, Yunyun confesses to her true state as a Borner, but without any kind of special abilities granted to her by the Ua virus' infection since it merely gave her two appendixes. Minoru later pays him with money to help her be a double agent to both him and the Snakes as his personal informant.
6	"Love & Piece"; Transliteration: "Love & Piece"	Yoshiyuki Asai	Mari Okada	August 8, 2009
Minoru later learns of a village in the Kashmir region, where most of its residents were purposely infected by the Ua virus with a few survivors being dubbed as Borners for having mysterious abilities given to them by the virus. Minoru later meets with Hakko, one of the employees of the bar he visited revealed to the reporter his suspicions that she was a Borner. The NBCR Anti-Terrorism Conference was now underway with armed Daedala PMCs protecting the dignitaries in the Shanghai International Conference Hall with armed policemen of the Chinese Ministry of Public Security. Liang Qi later perpetrates the bombing of the hall's interior after the American President concluded his speech. Canaan and Minoru head to the hall themselves to secure Maria themselves after hearing the bombings. Armed Public Security policemen later confronted Daedala contractors when they, later with Alphard, attacked the officers when they were trying to get to the building's central control room. Maria is detained by Daedala forces under Liang Qi's instruction to lure Canaan in and kill her. But remembering the words taught to her by Siam in her youth, Alphard shoots Liang Qi to prevent her from further attacking Maria. Meanwhile, all of the dignitaries were in the underground bunker as planned in case of a terrorist attack in order to be eventually infected by the Ua virus.
7	"Gravestones"; Transliteration: "Bohyō" (Japanese: 慕漂)	Takefumi Anzai	Mari Okada	August 15, 2009
The American government convenes an emergency meeting after a dignitary dies from a Ua virus infection. Alphard ignores Liang Qi's anger over her qualms of killing Canaan. Kenji Ōsawa, head of Okashi Pharmaceutical, had planned to send the anti-Ua virus vaccine to Shanghai when he was supposedly killed in a car bomb. This "event" forced the American military to send in B-2 bombers from Guam to bomb the entire Shanghai International Conference Hall in order to purge the Ua virus in flames and prevent in from spreading throughout Shanghai. Canaan infiltrates the hall, rescuing Maria after fending off several Daedala security forces personnel impending her progress. Canaan and Yuri Natsume worked together to hack the B-2's GPS system and let the bombs miss the conference hall to save the dignitaries inside while heavily armed PLA Special Operations Forces troopers escorted Kenji safely at the outskirts of the hall. Alphard and Cummings retreat underground with a handful of Daedala security forces, the former already deciding to abandon Liang Qi to let her fend for herself. When Maria and Canaan emerge outside, Canaan had collapsed due to her exhaustive use of her synesthesia abilities.
8	"Voice"; Transliteration: "Koe" (Japanese: 乞)	Tomoaki Ōta	Mari Okada	August 22, 2009
Canaan emerged safe after she collapsed, being told by Maria that she was simply tired. Kenji, in a phone conversation with Minoru, further informs him of the Ua virus and how sometimes people can survive from the virus' infection. The American Vice President later has a tapped phone conversation with Alphard, thanking him for the cooperation she had with him in the nature of ensuring "anti-terrorism" business keeps going for a few more years. During a public concert, Hakko showed off her Borner ability with people having severe headaches without them being aware. It later forced Canaan and Maria to flee as Hakko had nightmares of how she first knew of her ability from being infected with the Ua virus. Minoru later confronts Santana, Hakko's "guardian", over the nature of the Borners and the Ua virus. Canaan and Maria later go on a long cruise with Santana, Minoru and Hakko in a SUV that took them to the desert regions of China. Maria and Canaan later talked about being together and reaffirming their friendship since it helped them over problems they had such as Canaan's inability to see colors from her synesthesia or from Maria having Canaan by her side all the way, straining the two of them in potential danger. Hakko tries to strangle Canaan in her sleep, remarking to the mercenary that it was her fault. The group later encounters Yunyun, traveling on a bicycle.
9	"Flowers of the Past"; Transliteration: "Kakohana" (Japanese: 過去花)	Heo Jong	Mari Okada	August 29, 2009
Canaan and the others arrive at the outskirts of an abandoned village, where Santana reveals to everyone that it had been the staging grounds of the Ua virus when a said infestation would have actually occurred. He later resigns from the CIA in disgust when he learns that CIA operatives had disguised themselves as Centers for Disease Control and Prevention personnel with the Snakes under Alphard in order to tests it effectiveness on the villagers, which resulted in the creation of both the Borners and the Unblooms in an effort to create supersoldiers under the "Flower Garden Plan." Alphard later encounters Santana, telling him that she would head to the "Factory". A Snake chopper under Liang Qi's control ambushed Canaan when she targeted her by firing rockets, temporarily sealing her in rubble with Alphard encountering the mercenary. When Alphard left, she informed the ex-CIA agent that he needs to tell Canaan her real name. As Canaan was about to get out of the rubble, Alphard tells Santana that Canaan's real name was "Despair".
10	"Loss"; Transliteration: "Sōshū" (Japanese: 想執)	Yoshiyuki Asai	Mari Okada	September 5, 2009
With Santana's assistance, he was able to lead Canaan and the others inside the "Factory". They were ambushed by Unbloom zombies after being inside, different from the Unblooms Santana had rescued personally after leaving the CIA as they have completely lost all human emotions. Hakko later encounters Liang Qi via TV screen and begins to mock her to come after her. When Hakko returns to the chapel-like room to face Liang Qi, she inadvertently kills Santana with the power of her voice when he had been captured and gagged earlier after being separated. Natsume comes to Canaan and Minoru aid after blasting her way into the facility. Minoru and Canaan encounter a distraught Hakko, who begins shooting randomly, and Minoru attempts to calm her down. Maria and Yunyun enter the "Factory" themselves while wearing mascot head costumes before arriving in the flower gardens. However, Natsume enters the area and encounters the two of them. Seeing that Maria and Yunyun may impede her, Natsume draws out her pistol and aims it at them.
11	"See-Saw"; Transliteration: "Shīsō" (Japanese: 彼女添)	Takefumi Anzai	Mari Okada	September 12, 2009
Alphard enters the flower gardens and stops Natsume. Alphard then threatens Maria and Yunyun to leave; they reluctantly obey, and go to meet up with Canaan. Alphard and Natsume are now alone, and it is revealed that Natsume is a secret agent for the Japanese Defense Intelligence Headquarters and was actually trying to obtain data related to the Ua virus. Canaan wakes up Minoru, who had been injured during his attempt to calm Hakko down. They meet up with Maria and Yunyun, who ask where Hakko and Santana is. Canaan decides to go back to the factory one more time, promising to find Hakko. Back in the Factory, Liang Qi grows increasingly unstable as Alphard and Cummings try to deal with her, and ultimately has to be killed after she takes a dose of the Ua virus in a mad bid for Alphard's attention with horrific results due to her not having the necessary genetics for synaesthesia. Meanwhile, a covert American task force known as Task Force 124 is deployed from Afghanistan, with orders to take down the Factory. While the bombers are on their way, Canaan fights off the advance of Delta Force operators already in the Factory while the PLA was deployed to the Factory. She finds a depressed Hakko and a dead Santana, and Hakko tells her to leave her behind and take the medicine she found for Yunyun. Canaan returns to her friends to safely retreat as the factory collapses with Hakko inside. As they mourn Hakko and Santana's deaths, Maria requests to take Canaan's picture, who solemnly replies.
12	"The Seasonal Train"; Transliteration: "Kisetsu ressha" (Japanese: 忌殺劣者)	Heo Jong	Mari Okada	September 19, 2009
The group is in low spirits in the wake of Hakko and Santana's deaths. Maria, troubled by Canaan's despair, tries to cheer her up, with limited success, and she notices how depressing Canaan looks in the picture she took of Canaan in the previous episode. The next morning, they find themselves stranded when their car breaks down. Minoru volunteers to stay behind to take care of the car while the girls take a train back to Shanghai. However, the train is stopped in a supposed inspection. While Canaan leaves to investigate after hearing gunshots, she is struck by a hallucination of Siam, who tells her to see the truth with her own eyes, while a vision of Hakko blames her for everybody's deaths. Meanwhile, Alphard strolls into the same cabin as Maria and Yunyun while the train was covertly hijacked by Daedala contractors. She convinces Maria to assist her in a decisive match with Canaan, which Maria complies by taking Alphard's picture. Alphard shoots Maria and locks her and Yunyun in a car rigged with a bomb in an effort to get Canaan to fight at her full power. As Canaan and Alphard fight, Alphard continually taunts Canaan by saying she is the reason for Siam's death. Maria, not wanting Canaan to be burdened by her, has Yunyun detach her train car as the bomb counts down.
13	"The Promised Land"; Transliteration: "Kibō no chi" (Japanese: キボウノチ)	Masahiro Andō	Mari Okada	September 26, 2009
As the bomb counts down, Yunyun has second thoughts and runs after the detached carriage to save Maria. The bomb eventually explodes and Canaan reacts, as what presumably is her "true strength" becomes apparent, slowly being able to overpower Alphard. Despite some assistance from the remnants of Alphard's Daedala forces, Canaan was able to defeat her without relying on the attempted bombing on Maria in the Daedala-hijacked train. Canaan tries to save Alphard after she trips and falls down from the top of the train carriage, but Alphard instead opts to free herself from Siam's influence and chooses to amputate her left arm by using Canaan's pistol. Maria wakes up in a hospital and sees Minoru, with whom she discusses her ties with Canaan. Canaan contemplates her friendship with Maria. Maria and Minoru are set to leave Shanghai. Minoru, once again, fails to find a good story, since he decides to keep the story of Canaan out, and he wonders about getting a new job. Maria thinks more on her part in this story as most of the cast go about their separate ways. Some time later, in Bologna, Canaan receives a new assignment from Natsume, that being to find and kill a woman missing one arm.
