= Kamiki =

Kamiki (written: 上木 or 神木) is a Japanese surname. Notable people with the surname include:

- Aya Kamiki (上木 彩矢, born 1985), Japanese singer-songwriter
- Ryunosuke Kamiki (神木 隆之介, born 1993), Japanese actor and voice actor
