= Time Prisoners =

Chinese webcomic

Space-Time Prisoners

时空囚徒/时空使徒
- Genre: Fantasy, Action
- Author: Bai Xiao
- Publisher: Tencent
- Original run: February 9, 2015 – December 30, 2018

- Bloodivores
- Anime television series
- Directed by: Chen Ye; Masashi Nakamura
- Written by: Chen Ye
- Music by: Isao
- Studio: Creators in Pack; NAMU Animation
- Licensed by: Crunchyroll
- Original network: Tokyo MX
- Original run: October 1, 2016 – December 17, 2016
- Episodes: 12

Space-Time Prisoners (时空囚徒) is a vampire survival action Chinese webcomic written and illustrated by Bai Xiao. On October 1, 2016, an anime adaptation titled Bloodivores (ブラッディヴォーレス) began airing. The anime series is directed by Chen Ye and Masashi Nakamura, produced by Haoliners Animation League's Japanese branch Emon and animated by Creators in Pack with NAMU Animation.

== Plot ==
60 years ago, some people began to suffer from a strange case of insomnia that struck the entire population. Unable to sleep for more than a week, a large number of people become completely sleep deprived and eventually went mad with rage. A new medicine was produced to cure the illness but it has a side effect which turned patients into vampires. Later, these vampires were called the "Bloodivores." They are feared by other people and wear a special necklace that sends a signal to the police if a Bloodivore is unable to control their emotions.

Mi Liu is called a "child of hope" — born from a human and a Bloodivore — but when he along with his three friends are vilified for killing all humans in a bank they robbed, they are sentenced to death. Then a strange thing happens where they are thrown into a mysterious place with a lot of unexplainable monsters along with other sentenced-to-death prisoners. A girl greets them and reveals they have been given new collars that are filled with explosives to prevent them from killing other bloodivores. She then announces their mission: to survive.

== Cast ==
- Kenji Akabane as Mi Liu (弥流)
- Eri Kitamura as Anji (左安琪)
- Takuya Satō as Lee Shin
- Sho Hayami as Lou Yao

== Music ==
The opening song is "Nenten" by Mili and the ending theme song is "Quiet Squall" by Siraph.
