= Are You Happy Now? (album) =

Are you happy now?

Studio album by Aya Kamiki
- Released: September 10, 2008
- Recorded: 2008
- Genres: J-pop, rock
- Length: 56:23
- Label: Giza Studio
- Producers: Aya Kamiki, Daiko Nagato

Aya Kamiki chronology
Ashita no Tame ni ~Forever More~ (2007)	Are you happy now? (2008)	Aya Kamiki Greatest Best; Individual Emotion (2010)

Singles from Are you happy now?
- 1. "SUNDAY MORNING" Released: March 5, 2008; 2. "Kimi Sarishi Yuuwaku" Released: June 18, 2008; 3. "Summer Memories" Released: August 6, 2008

Are you happy now? is the third major album of artist Aya Kamiki, released on September 10, 2008. The album debuted at number 10 on the Oricon Weekly Chart, number 6 on the Oricon Daily Chart.

== CD track listing ==
All lyrics are written by Aya Kamiki except Ai wa Kurayami no Naka de, which was written by Izumi Sakai.

No.	Title	Music	Length
1.	"Are You Happy Now?"	Hitoshi Okamoto
2.	"It's a Beautiful Day"	Hitoshi Okamoto
3.	"Just Take My Heart"	Hitoshi Okamoto
4.	"Itsu no Hi mo Kimi Dake I Remember you (いつの日も君だけ I Remember you)"	Yuichirou Iwai
5.	"Sunday Morning"	Aika Ohno
6.	"Summer Memories"	Aika Ohno
7.	"I'm Your Side"	Hitoshi Okamoto
8.	"Walking Down the Street"	Kousuke Oshima
9.	"Secret Night"	Akihito Tokunaga
10.	"Crash"	Munetaka Kawamoto
11.	"Good-bye My Love"	Hitoshi Okamoto
12.	"Kimi Sarishi Yuuwaku (君去りし誘惑)"	Aika Ohno
13.	"Best of My Love"	Munetaka Kawamoto
14.	"Ai wa Kurayami no Naka de (愛は暗闇の中で; (Premium Track / Zard Cover))"	Seiichiro Kuribayashi

== Cover ==
Aika Ohno, the composer of Kimi Sarishi Yuuwaku, covered the song in her cover album Silent Passage.

== DVD track listing ==
Music Video DVD

1. SUNDAY MORNING (Making Of)
2. SUNDAY MORNING (Music Video)
3. Kimi Sarishi Yuuwaku (Making Of)
4. Kimi Sarishi Yuuwaku (Music Video)
5. Summer Memories (Making Of)
6. Summer Memories (Music Video)

Live DVD

1. Nemutteita Kimochi Nemutteita Kokoro
2. Secret Code
3. Pierrot
4. Mō Kimi Dake o Hanashitari wa Shinai
5. Ashita no Tame ni

== In other media ==
"Are you happy now?" was the Japan Countdown opening theme, MU-GEN ending theme and Jouhou Paradise ending theme for September.

== Albums sales ==
Week	Position	Sales
1	# 10	11,957
2	# 47	3025
3	# 125	1446
4	# 136	1040
5	# 244	538
		18,006
