= Siraph =

Japanese band

- Origin: Tokyo, Japan
- Genres: Alternative rock; Post-rock; electronica; jazz
- Years active: 2016–present
- Label: NBCUniversal Entertainment Japan
- Members: Annabel; Masayuki Hasuo; Yoshimasa Terui; Hideaki Yamasaki; Ken Yamashita
- Website: siraph.com

Siraph is a Japanese alternative rock band formed by Annabel (vocals), Masayuki Hasuo (keyboards), Yoshimasa Terui (guitar), Hideaki Yamasaki (bass), and Ken Yamashita (drums). The band was formed in 2016, evolving from a support band for Annabel's solo work.

== Biography ==
Annabel, an Argentine-born, Japan-raised singer, had a rich history in the dōjin music scene, having been part of units like Binaria (with Nagi Yanagi, Yoshihisa Nagao, and Xai) and anNina (with Bermei Inazawa), and made her major solo debut in 2009. In 2014, Annabel released her solo album Talk, featuring contributions from guitarist Yoshimasa Terui (Haisuinonasa) and keyboardist Masayuki Hasuo (ex-School Food Punishment). For the album's release concert, they were joined by bassist Hideaki Yamasaki (ex-School Food Punishment) and initially drummer Kazuta Nakamura (ex-The Cabs). The positive chemistry during this performance inspired Annabel to continue performing with a band setup. Drummer Ken Yamashita (Mop of Head, Alaska Jam) later joined, replacing Nakamura, and the group began performing as the "Annabel Band." The desire to create music that showcased the individual strengths of its members led to the official formation of Siraph in 2016.

On May 18, 2016, Siraph released their debut mini-album, Siraph, which featured six tracks, with three composed by Ryoji Hasuo and three by Junsei Terui, all with lyrics written by Annabel. The album showcased a blend of post-rock and electronica, marked by intricate and dynamic compositions. The release was accompanied by an in-store live event, with previews of the album made available on SoundCloud. Later in 2016, Siraph released their first single, "Quiet Squall," which was selected as the ending theme for the TV anime series Bloodivores.

== Discography ==
=== Studio albums ===
Title	Details
Past & Current	Released: May 13, 2019; Label: Self-release; Formats: Digital download
