= W-B-X (W-Boiled Extreme) =

- The cover of the CD+DVD combo pack featuring Aya Kamiki and TAKUYA

Single by Aya Kamiki and TAKUYA

from the album Individual Emotion
- Released: November 11, 2009
- Genre: J-pop
- Label: Avex Trax
- Songwriter(s): Shoko Fujibayashi (lyricist), Shuhei Naruse (composer, arranger), TAKUYA (arranger)
- Producer(s): Shuhei Naruse

Aya Kamiki singles chronology
"Sekai wa Sore demo Kawari wa Shinai" (2008)	"W-B-X (W-Boiled Extreme)" (2009)	"Revolver" (2010)

TAKUYA singles chronology
"Butterfly" (2009)	"W-B-X (W-Boiled Extreme)" (2009)

Kamen Rider Series theme song singles chronology
"The Next Decade" (2009)	"W-B-X (W-Boiled Extreme)" (2009)	"Stay the Ride Alive" (2010)

Alternative cover
- The cover of the standard CD release featuring Kamen Rider Double CycloneJoker

"W-B-X (W-Boiled Extreme)" (Note: The "W" symbols in the title are read as the word "double".) (stylized as "W-B-X ～W-Boiled Extreme～") is the eleventh single by Japanese singer-songwriter Aya Kamiki and the first as a collaboration with TAKUYA, former guitarist of the Judy and Mary, as Aya Kamiki w TAKUYA (上木彩矢 w TAKUYA, Kamiki Aya w TAKUYA). The song is Kamiki's first release under the Avex Trax label and is used as the opening theme for Kamen Rider W. It is also a single from her first album released under Avex titled Individual Emotion.

== Summary ==
In its first day of release, the single sold 7000 copies and reached #8 on the Oricon daily charts. It also became the #1 theme song downloaded as a ringtone for the week of November 25 to December 1. The single has sold 54,176 copies during 27 weeks and has been downloaded more than 100,000 times (Gold) on mobile.

== Music Staff ==
- Words: Shoko Fujibayashi (藤林 聖子, Fujibayashi Shōko)
- Music: Shuhei Naruse (鳴瀬 シュウヘイ, Naruse Shūhei)
- Arrange: TAKUYA & Shuhei Naruse
- Guitar: TAKUYA
- Bass: Toshiyanof the 3rd
- Drums: Masaki

== Track list ==
All lyrics are written by Shoko Fujibayashi; all music is composed by Shuhei Naruse

CD
No.	Title	Length
1.	"W-B-X (W-Boiled Extreme)"	3:19
2.	"W-B-X (Hard Boiled Jazz Edit.)"	3:53
3.	"W-B-X (W-Boiled Extreme) (Instrumental)"	3:18

DVD
No.	Title	Length
1.	"W-B-X (Video Boiled Extreme)"
