= Sekai wa Sore demo Kawari wa Shinai =

2008 single by Aya Kamiki

Single by Aya Kamiki
- Language: Japanese
- B-side: "Ever So Sweet"
- Released: December 3, 2008
- Genre: Rock
- Length: 5:43
- Label: Giza Studio
- Composer: Aika Ōno
- Lyricist: Aya Kamiki

Aya Kamiki singles chronology
| "Summer Memories" (2008) | "Sekai wa Sore demo Kawari wa Shinai" (2008) | "W-B-X (W-Boiled Extreme)" (2009) |

"Sekai wa Sore demo Kawari wa Shinai" (Japanese: 世界はそれでも変わりはしない; lit. "Even So The World Doesn't Change") is a song by Japanese singer Aya Kamiki. It was released on December 3, 2008, as Kamiki's 10th single. Written by Kamiki and composed by Aika Ōno, the song appears in the soundtrack to the visual novel video game 428: Shibuya Scramble, used as the opening, ending, and insert theme. Musically, the song opens with a calm strings intro and transitions into rock, and it lyrically emphasizes hope and positivity even in a mostly unchanging world.

The song peaked at No. 42 on Oricon's Japanese Singles Chart and charted for three consecutive weeks. Alongside 428, it received promotion through a Jack event in Shibuya, Tokyo, a "takeover" of the city. The promotion included billboards, usage as background music in public areas, and two live performances. A music video featuring Kamiki and characters from 428 was released, shot in a similar style to the game.

== Theme and background ==
"Sekai wa Sore demo Kawari wa Shinai"
A sample of the song. This begins with the strings intro, and cuts to the rock chorus at 0:12.

"Sekai wa Sore demo Kawari wa Shinai" opens with a slower-paced, calm strings intro, before transitioning into Aya Kamiki's usual rock style. The lyrics begin with Kamiki describing an unchanging and occasionally low-spirited world, but develop to prioritize a positive tone as Kamiki emphasizes hope towards the tomorrow with courage and cooperation. Lyrics were written by Kamiki; she said after a performance of the song that while a single person's strength may be small, it can become far greater with unity, continuing that the lyrics had been based on such a perspective. Composition was handled by Aika Ōno, who had helped Kamiki as composer since Kamiki's fourth single "Nemutteita Kimochi Nemutteita Kokoro" (2007), whilst Takeshi Hayama was in charge of arrangement. The song's title, translating to "Even So The World Doesn't Change", was conceived by Kamiki while she was watching the news.

The song was selected over others to be used as the theme to Chunsoft's visual novel game 428: Shibuya Scramble. Kamiki received the offer of potentially performing the theme to the game in February 2007, to which she presented "Sekai wa Sore demo Kawari wa Shinai" as she believed it to have the most fitting theme. 428 executive producer and co-writer Jiro Ishii wanted to use whatever song they picked also as the game's ending theme, and explained that "Sekai wa Sore demo Kawari wa Shinai" gave him the best feeling of all alternatives, as it holds a positive message, rather than a strictly emotional one. Ishii said that there was disagreement among the staff members on what genre the game's theme should have, but affirmed they were all satisfied with "Sekai wa Sore demo Kawari wa Shinai". When Ishii explained this at a promotional event, Kamiki responded saying it is reassuring, as she "always" feels uncertain during the production of her music.

In addition to its use in the soundtrack, "Sekai wa Sore demo Kawari wa Shinai" appears within the fictional universe of 428 alongside Kamiki. The filming of Kamiki's scenes began before the game's scenario had been rewritten for her appearance. Ishii commented that the scenes were hard to shoot due to difficulty in capturing Kamiki's image, but recalled that discussion was made easier by himself, Kamiki, and the photography director communicating in their native Kansai dialect.

== Release and reception ==
The single was released by Giza Studio with the catalogue number GZCA-7131 on December 3, 2008, about four months after Kamiki's previous single "Summer Memories", and a day before the release of 428: Shibuya Scramble. It is Kamiki's 10th single and her final release of 2008. The release features the title track, its instrumental version, and the B-side "Ever So Sweet".

Bob Richardson reviewed the single for RPGFan, writing that "Sekai wa Sore demo Kawari wa Shinai" and its B-side made the original soundtrack of 428: Shibuya Scramble one of "hottest [...] to date." He wrote that, while the song sounds like "conventional" J-pop, its energic guitar and drums will keep "heads bobbing," recommending the song to fans of "well-performed" singles and the genre. Commercially, the single sold 3,117 units around its week of release and placed at No. 46 on Billboard Japan's single sales ranking. It debuted and peaked at No. 42 on Oricon's Singles Chart during the week of December 15. It charted for two more consecutive weeks, reaching 4,378 total sales, before leaving the chart's 200 spots with the first week of 2009. Oricon ranked it as Kamiki's ninth best selling single out of eleven.

== Promotion ==
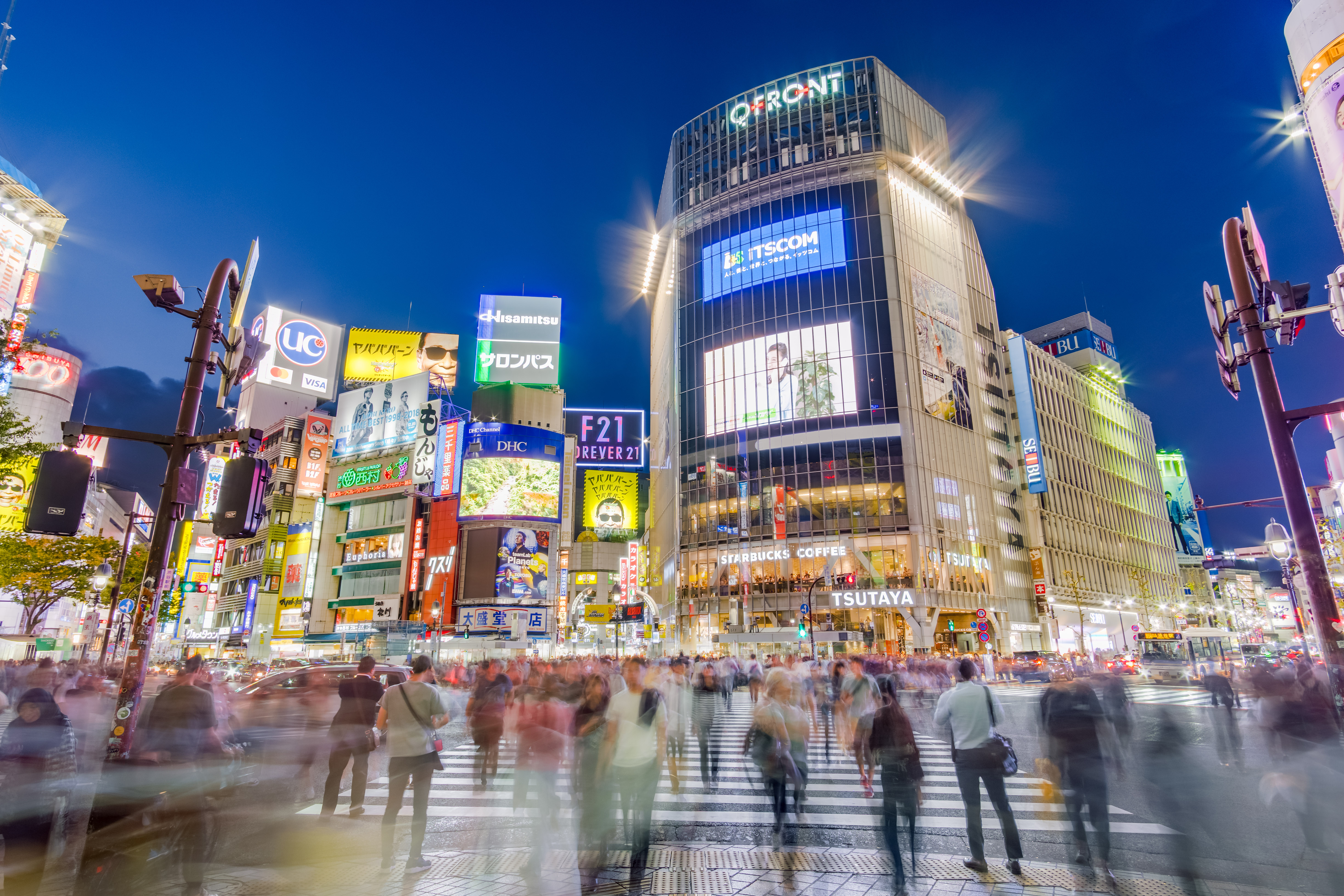
Promotion of "Sekai wa Sore demo Kawari wa Shinai" was centered in Shibuya, Tokyo

In most aspects of its marketing, the song was branded alongside 428: Shibuya Scramble. A disc featuring a video showcasing Kamiki's discography was released in the same case as a 428 demo disc. The song's primary marketing campaign was named "428 × Aya Kamiki" Shibuya Jack, a "takeover" of the eponymous city. Posters illustrating the song and 428 were shown on nine billboards in seven different areas of Shibuya and on wrap advertising. The song was played as background music in public areas, spanning outside of Shibuya and into Shinjuku, Roppongi, and Akihabara.

A music video for the song was released on November 29, exclusively on the web page for Kamiki and Chunsoft's collaboration. The video is shot in a style similar to 428: Shibuya Scramble and alternates between Kamiki, who is singing the song in an environment imitating a live performance, and the 428 characters Achi Endo and Shinya Kano (respectively played by Yūto Nakamura and Kousei Amano) as they roam a nighttime Shibuya.

At 4PM, December 4, Kamiki performed the song in a surprise performance outside the Shibuya department store 109 during a release event for 428. Kamiki performed alone, without her usual band, for an audience of around one hundred. (Note: Natalie.mu reported attendance as a "crowd of 1000", whereas Dengeki Online and Famitsu approximated attendance to "close to" or "above" one hundred.) After the performance, Kamiki shortly appeared at a 428 signing meet and greet alongside Jiro Ishii. Later that day, Kamiki also performed the song as a guest on the late-night NHK General TV program Music Japan.

== Personnel ==
Credits adapted from Kamiki's official discography profile.

- Aya Kamiki – vocals, lyrics
- Aika Ōno – composer
- Takeshi Hayama – arrangement

== Track listing ==
All lyrics are written by Aya Kamiki.

CD single
| No. | Title | Music | Japanese title | Length |
|---|---|---|---|---|
| 1. | "Sekai wa Sore demo Kawari wa Shinai" | Aika Ōno | 世界はそれでも変わりはしない | 5:43 |
| 2. | "Ever So Sweet" | Hitoshi Okamoto | EVER SO SWEET | 5:15 |
| 3. | "Sekai wa Sore demo Kawari wa Shinai" (Instrumental) | Ōno | 世界はそれでも変わりはしない | 5:42 |
| Total length: | | | | 16:40 |

Digital download
| No. | Title | Music | Japanese title | Length |
|---|---|---|---|---|
| 1. | "Sekai wa Sore demo Kawari wa Shinai" | Ōno | 世界はそれでも変わりはしない | 5:44 |
| 2. | "Ever So Sweet" | Okamoto | EVER SO SWEET | 5:16 |
| Total length: | | | | 11:00 |

== Charts ==
Chart performance for "Sekai wa Sore demo Kawari wa Shinai"
| Chart (2008) | Peak position |
|---|---|
| Japan (Oricon) | 42 |
| Japan Top Single Sales (Billboard Japan) | 46 |

== Release history ==
Release dates and formats for "Sekai wa Sore demo Kawari wa Shinai"
| Region | Date | Format | Label | Catalogue code | Ref(s). |
|---|---|---|---|---|---|
| Japan | December 3, 2008 | CD single | Giza Studio | GZCA-7131 | |
| Japan | December 3, 2008 | Digital download | Giza Studio | —N/a | |
