= Remioromen =

Japanese rock band

Remioromen レミオロメン
- Genres: Alternative rock, pop rock
- Years active: 2000–2012 2025-present
- Labels: Daizawa Records (2003), Speedstar Records (2003–2008), Oorong Records (from 2009)
- Members: Ryota Fujimaki; Keisuke Maeda; Osamu Jingūji
- Website: www.remioromen.jp

Remioromen (レミオロメン) is a Japanese rock band, formed by Ryōta Fujimaki, Keisuke Maeda and Osamu Jingūji in 2000.

== History ==
Remioromen was formed in December 2000 with their current three person line up. They say that the name of the band has no real significance as a whole and was instead the result of wordplay. Playing rock-paper-scissors they allowed winners to decide one or more syllables first and losers to decide more syllables later. Fujimaki won and chose the first syllable from the Japanese phoneticization of the British band he liked "Radiohead", "re." Osamu Jingūji came second and chose his girlfriend's and his own given names' first syllables, "mio." Maeda came third, and since he liked trams, chose the first three syllables from the Japanese for tram "romendensha" (lit. road face train)". On November 25 of 2003 they did their first one-man live at Shibuya-AX. Since their inception the band has been steadily climbing to the top of the Oricon charts. For the release of Sangatsu Kokonoka (3月9日) (March 9) they returned to their home town in the Yamanashi Prefecture to perform live in their old school's gymnasium. In 2005 Sangatsu Kokonoka was used in a choral arrangement for the drama Ichi Rittoru no Namida (1 Litre Of Tears) and "Konayuki" was used as the insert song. For the release of the single Sangatsu Kokonoka was included in an arrangement with a string quartet. This gained the band a great deal of popularity and "Konayuki" became one of the best selling singles of 2005. Their third album Horizon has had high sales, making it # 1 on the Oricon Album charts for three weeks.

The first track in their album Kaze no Chroma, entitled "Tsubasa", was the ending theme in the movie Major: Yuujou no Winning Shot which was based on the hit baseball manga made by Takuya Mitsuda.

Though Remioromen has never had a single rank at number 1, their recent releases have stayed on the charts for long periods of time and their overall sales have been quite high. Remioromen generally sticks to laid back pop/rock with catchy hooks.

The theme song for the Japanese version of the film Dear Wendy is their song "Gogo no Teikiatsu".

In MTV Video Music Awards Japan 2006 (MTV VMAJ 2006) Remioromen Music Video "Konayuki" won The Best Pop Video Award.

On 1 February 2012, an official announcement was made on their website, stating the suspension of the group. No explanations were given for the suspending of the band's activity.

Ryota Fujimaki, the lead vocalist and guitarist, debuted on 17 October 2012, with a solo album titled Ookami Seinen (オオカミ青年).

On December 6, 2025, Remioromen reunited and are having a reunion tour.

== Members ==
- Ryota Fujimaki (藤巻亮太, Fujimaki Ryōta) (b. January 12, 1980) is vocalist and plays guitar.
- Keisuke Maeda (前田啓介, Maeda Keisuke) (b. September 11, 1979) plays bass guitar.
- Osamu Jinguji (神宮司治, Jingūji Osamu) (b. March 5, 1980) plays drums.

== Discography ==
=== Albums ===
==== Studio albums ====
Album #	Album information	Weekly Albums Charts	Year-End Albums Charts	Track listing	Copies Sold
1st	Asagao (朝顔): Released: November 19, 2003; First Week Sales: 19,725; Chart Run: 65 weeks; Certification: Gold (RIAJ)	17	-	Track listing CD: 1. まめ電球 (Mame denkyuu); 2. 雨上がり (Ameagari); 3. 日めくりカレンダー (Himekuri Calendar); 4. ビールとプリン (Beer to Pudding); 5. 朝顔 (Asagao); 6. 昭和 (Shouwa); 7. すきま風 (Sukima kaze); 8. フェスタ (Festa); 9. 電話 (Denwa); 10. タクシードライバー (Taxi Driver); 11. 追いかけっこ (Oikakekko)	113,152
2nd	ether (ether[エーテル]): Released: March 9, 2005; First Week Sales: 95,427; Chart Run: 71 weeks; Certification: Platinum (RIAJ)	2	-	Track listing CD: 1. 春夏秋冬 (Shunkashuutou); 2. モラトリアム (Moratorium); 3. 春景色 (Haru keshiki); 4. アカシア (Akashia); 5. 永遠と一瞬 (Eien to isshun); 6. 深呼吸 (Shinkokyuu); 7. ドッグイヤー (Dog Year); 8. 五月雨 (Samidare; 9. コスモス (Cosmos); 10. 3月9日 (Sangatsu Kokonoka); 11. 南風 (Minami Kaze); 12. 海のバラッド (Umi no Ballad)	402,205
3rd	Horizon: Released: May 17, 2006; First Week Sales: 320,255; Chart Run: 56 weeks; Certification: Double Platinum (RIAJ)	1	16	Track listing CD: 1. スタンドバイミー (Stand By Me); 2. 1-2 Love Forever; 3. プログラム (Program); 4. 蒼の世界 (Ao no sekai); 5. シフト (Shift); 6. 傘クラゲ (Kasa Kurage); 7. 太陽の下 (Taiyou no shita); 8. MONSTER; 9. 明日に架かる橋 (Ashita ni kakeru hashi); 10. 紙ふぶき (Kamifubuki); 11. 粉雪 (Konayuki); 12. 流星 (Ryuusei)	676,672
4th	Kaze no Chroma (風のクロマ): Released: October 29, 2008; Oricon Weekly Ranking: No. 3; First Week Sales: 55,229; Chart Run: 21 weeks	3	128	Track listing CD: 1. 翼 (Tsubasa); 2. オーケストラ (Orchestra); 3. ランデブータンデム (Rendezvous Tandem); 4. リズム (Rhythm; 5. 透明 (Toumei); 6. 蛍 (Hotaru); 7. 青春の光 (Seishun no Hikari); 8. RUN; 9. 星取り (Hoshitori); 10. もっと遠くへ (Motto Tooku e); 11. Merry go round 12. 茜空 (Akanezora); 13. Wonderful & Beautiful; 14. 幸せのカタチ (Shiawase no Katachi); 15. 花火 (Hanabi); DVD: 1. 翼 (Tsubasa) PV; 2. Making of 翼 (Tsubasa) PV	89,801
5th	Kachōfūgetsu (花鳥風月): Released: March 3, 2010; First Week Sales: 52,950; Chart Run: 12 weeks	2	92	Track listing CD: 1. Starting Over; 2. ロックンロール (Rock 'n' Roll); 3. 虹をこえて (Niji wo Koete); 4. ありがとう (Arigatou); 5. 君は太陽 (Kimi wa Taiyou); 6. 花になる (Hana ni Naru); 7. 恋の予感から (Koi no Yokan Kara); 8. 花鳥風月 (Kachoufuugetsu); 9. 大晦日の歌 (Oomisoka no Uta); 10. Tomorrow; 11. 東京 (Tokyo); 12. 小さな幸せ (Chiisa na Shiawase); DVD: 1. 花鳥風月 (Kachoufuugetsu) Live Movie	85,129

==== Compilation albums ====
Album #	Album information	Weekly Albums Charts	Year-End Albums Charts	Track listing	Copies Sold
1st	Remio Best (レミオベスト): Released: March 9, 2009; First Week Sales: 280,599; Chart Run: 49 weeks	1	8	Track listing CD: 1. Sakura; 2. 3月9日 (Sangatsu Kokonoka); 3. スタンドバイミー (Stand by Me); 4. 電話 (Denwa); 5. ビールとプリン (Beer and Pudding); 6. もっと遠くへ (Motto Tooku he); 7. 雨上がり (Ameagari); 8. 南風 (Minami Kaze); 9. 明日に架かる橋 (Asu ni Kakeru Hashi); 10. 太陽の下 (Taiyou no Shita); 11. Wonderful & Beautiful; 12. アイランド (Island); 13. 粉雪 (Konayuki); 14. 紙ふぶき (Kamifubuki); 15. 夢の蕾 (Yume no Tsubomi); DVD: Remioromen SUMMER LIVE "STAND BY ME": 1. モラトリアム(Moratorium); 2. 1-2 Love Forever; 3. 蒼の世界 (Ao no Sekai); 4. ドッグイヤー (Dog Ear); 5. コスモス (Cosmos); 6. 傘クラゲ (Kasa Kurage); 7. 電話 (Denwa); 8. 五月雨 (Satsukiame); 9. シフト (Shift); 10. プログラム (Program); 11. MONSTER; 12. 紙ふぶき (Kamifubuki); 13. 粉雪 (Konayuki); 14. 南風 (Minamikaze); 15. 雨上がり (Ameagari); 16. スタンドバイミー (Stand by Me); Encore: 1. 日めくりカレンダー (Himekuri Calendar); 2. 3月9日 (Sangatsu Kokonoka); 3. 明日に架かる橋 (Asu ni Kakeru Hashi); 4. 太陽の下 (Taiyou no Shita); 5. 流星 (Ryuusei); YAMANASHI BONUS DISC: 1. ラジオ (Radio - Unreleased Demo)	508,679
2nd	Singles Best+: Released: March 4, 2026	11	—		7,019

==== Live albums ====
Album #	Album information	Weekly Albums Charts	Year-End Albums Charts	Track listing	Copies Sold
1st	Flash and Gleam: Released: November 1, 2006; First Week Sales: 51,318; Chart Run: 22 weeks; Certification: Gold (RIAJ)	4	-	Track listing CD DISC 1: 1. モラトリアム (Moratorium); 2. 1 – 2 Love Forever; 3. ドッグイヤー (Dog Year); 4. 傘クラゲ (Kasa Kurage); 5. 五月雨 (Samidare); 6. シフト (Shift); 7. MONSTER; 8. 紙ふぶき (Kami fubuki); 9. 粉雪 (Konayuki); 10. 南風 (Minami Kaze); 11. 雨上がり (Ameagari); 12. スタンドバイミー (Stand by Me); 13. 3月9日 (Sangatsu Kokonoka); 14. 太陽の下 (Taiyou no shita); 15. 流星 (Ryuusei); DISC 2: 1. (アイランド) (Island)	108,861
2nd	"Your Songs" with Strings at Yokohama Arena: Released: April 27, 2011; First Week Sales: 7,068; Chart Run: 4 weeks; Certification:	14	-	Track listing CD DISC 1: 1. Opening Theme; 2. 3月9日 (with strings) (3gatsu 9ka (with strings)); 3. 春夏秋冬 (Shunkashuutou); 4. Sakura; 5. 夢の蕾 (Yume no Tsubomi); 6. 0永遠と一瞬 (Eien to Isshun); 7. Wonderful & Beautiful; 8. プログラム (Program); 9. 海のバラッド (Umi no Ballad); 10. 傘クラゲ (Kasa Kurage); 11. 流星 (Ryuusei); 12. アイランド (Island); DISC 2: 1. Strings Medley（茜空〜コスモス〜波）(Strings Medley (Akanezora~Cosmos~Nami)); 2. リズム (Rhythm ) 3. 五月雨 (Satsukiame); 4. 雨上がり (Ameagari); 5. まめ電球 (Mamedenkyuu); 6. モラトリアム (Moratorium); 7. スタンドバイミー (Stand by Me); 8. 太陽の下 (Taiyou no Shita); 9. 粉雪 (Konayuki); 10. Your Song; Encore: 1. 南風 (Minamikaze); 2. 明日に架かる橋 (Asu ni Kakaru Hashi); 3. もっと遠くへ (Motto Tooku e); 4. 3月9日 (3gatsu 9ka); DVD: 1. All 26 songs 2. Documentary	9,496

==== Mini-albums ====
Album #	Album information	Weekly Albums Charts	Year-End Albums Charts	Track listing	Copies Sold
1st	Festa: Released: March 12, 2003; First Week Sales: Chart Run: 20 weeks; Certification:	89	-	Track listing CD: 1. フェスタ (Festa); 2. まめ電球 (Mamedenkyuu); 3. 波 (Nami); 4. すきま風 (Sukimakaze); 5. 日めくりカレンダー (Himekuri Calendar); 6. ビールとプリン (Beer to Purin)	23,389

=== Singles ===
- Ameagari (雨上がり) (21 May 2003) {#43 Oricon}
- Denwa (電話) (20 August 2003) {#29 Oricon}
- Sangatsu kokonoka (3月9日) (9 March 2004) {#11 Oricon}
- Akashia (アカシア) (19 May 2004) {#17 Oricon}
- Moratorium (モラトリアム) (12 January 2005) {#8 Oricon}
- Minami kaze (南風) (9 February 2005) {#9 Oricon}
- Ao no sekai (蒼の世界) (12 October 2005) {#2 Oricon}
- Konayuki (粉雪) (16 November 2005) {#2 Oricon}
- Taiyō no shita (太陽の下) (1 March 2006) {#2 Oricon}
- Akanezora (茜空) (14 March 2007) {#3 Oricon}
- Hotaru (蛍)/RUN (9 May 2007) {#4 Oricon}
- Wonderful & Beautiful (12 December 2007) {#3 Oricon}
- Motto Tooku E (30 July 2008) {#6 Oricon}
- Yume no Tsubomi (7 January 2009) {#3 Oricon}
- Starting Over (15 July 2009) {#4 Oricon}
- Koi no Yokan Kara (恋の予感から) (25 November 2009) {#10 Oricon}
- Tatsun da joe (立つんだジョー) (28 July 2010) {#13 Oricon}

==== Digital singles ====
- Sakura (14 February 2009)
- Kachōfūgetsu (花鳥風月) (17 February 2010)
- Your Song (19 January 2011)
