= Tasuku =

- Gender: Male

Origin
- Origin: Japanese
- Meaning: Different meanings depending on the kanji used

Tasuku (written: 佑, 祐, 亮, 匡, 輔, 資 or 翼) is a masculine Japanese given name. Notable people with the name include:

- Tasuku Emoto (柄本 佑; born 1986), Japanese actor
- Tasuku Hatanaka (畠中 祐; born 1994), Japanese voice actor and singer
- Tasuku Hiraoka (平岡 翼; born 1996), Japanese footballer
- Tasuku Honjo (本庶 佑; born 1942), Japanese immunologist
- Tasuku Iwami (岩見 亮; born 1978), Japanese tennis player
- Tasuku Nagase (永瀬 匡; born 1993), Japanese actor
- Tasuku Okada (岡田 資; 1890–1949), Japanese general
- Tasuku Tanonaka (田野中 輔; born 1978), Japanese hurdler
