= Remio Best =

Greatest hits album by Remioromen
- Released: March 9, 2009
- Recorded: 2003–2008
- Genre: Rock
- Length: 77:43
- Label: Oorong Records/avex trax AVCO-36010/B CD+DVD; AVCO-36011 CD only

Remioromen chronology
Kaze no Chroma (2008)	Remio Best (2009)	Kachōfūgetsu (2010)

Remio Best is the first compilation album by Japanese band Remioromen, also their first on Oorong Records. It was released March 9, 2009, and debuted #1 on Japanese Oricon Album Weekly Chart, selling 280,599 copies in its first week, becoming their second #1 album on this chart following Horizon.

== Track listing ==
CD: "Remio Best"
No.	Title	Length
1.	"Sakura"	4:59
2.	"3gatsu 9ka" (3月9日; March 9th)	4:24
3.	"Stand By Me" (スタンドバイミー)	5:05
4.	"Denwa" (電話; Telephone)	5:31
5.	"Beer to Purin" (ビールとプリン; Beer and Pudding)	4:18
6.	"Motto Tooku e" (もっと遠くへ; Farther)	5:23
7.	"Ameagari" (雨上がり; After the Rain)	4:40
8.	"Minamikaze" (南風; Southern Wind)	4:02
9.	"Ashita ni Kakaru Hashi" (明日に架かる橋; Bridge Over Tomorrow)	4:19
10.	"Taiyou no Shita" (太陽の下; Under the Sun)	5:09
11.	"Wonderful & Beautiful"	4:56
12.	"Island" (アイランド)	6:03
13.	"Konayuki" (粉雪; Powder Snow)	5:23
14.	"Kamifubuki" (紙ふぶき; Confetti)	4:48
15.	"Yume no Tsubomi" (夢の蕾; Bud of Dreams)	4:57

== Chart positions ==
Oricon Sales Chart (Japan)

Release	Chart	Peak position	First week sales	Sales total	Chart run
March 9, 2009	Oricon Daily Charts	1	280,599	508,679	52 weeks
March 9, 2009	Oricon Weekly Charts	1	280,599	508,679	52 weeks
March 9, 2009	Oricon Monthly Charts	1	280,599	508,679	52 weeks
March 9, 2009	Oricon Yearly Charts	8	280,599	508,679	52 weeks
