= Faylan =

Japanese singer (born 1982)

- 飛蘭
- Born: Seki Masami (関まさみ); May 8, 1982 (age 44); Saitama, Japan
- Occupation: Singer
- Years active: 2005–present
- Agent: Freelancer
- Musical career
- Genres: J-pop; rock
- Labels: Lantis; Sony Music Artists

Masami Seki, professionally known as Faylan (飛蘭, Feiran; born May 8, 1982 in Saitama) is a female Japanese singer. Many of her songs are featured in video games and anime. She is a freelance artist, who was previously affiliated with management agency S, run by singer Hiromi Satō, from 2008 to September 30th, 2026. Since 2026, she also works as a vocal coach.

Her stage name was given by composer Noriyasu Agematsu. She is called "Feinyan" by her fans.

Faylan debuted as a singer in 2005 by singing an insert song for the game adaption of Girls Bravo. During her independent time, she worked as a doujin singer and released music through Comiket. She released one single, "Gekka no Rasen" (月華の螺旋), in 2007 under Hobi records label before she was recruited by Lantis.

Her first single with Lantis was "Mind as Judgment" in 2009. Since then, all her CDs have been released under Lantis. She is also signed with Sony Music Artists. Some of her songs were used as themes for anime series, including Canaan, Future Diary, Mobile Suit Gundam AGE and BlazBlue Alter Memory. Several games in the BlazBlue series also used songs that she performed.

In 2009, Faylan contributed to a cover of the song "Imagine" in a group called "Anison All-Stars" in order to tackle world hunger. In 2012, she performed in the United States for the first time, as she and Natsuko Aso supported JAM Project at the Otakon Music Festival in Baltimore.

In 2016, Sato announced Faylan would be going on an extended hiatus due to an autoimmune disease. This hiatus ended the same year in October.

== Discography ==
=== Singles ===
- "Gekka no Rasen" (月華の螺旋), April 6, 2007
- "mind as Judgment" – July 22, 2009
- "I Sing by My Soul" – November 11, 2009
- "Errand" – January 27, 2010
- "SERIOUS-AGE" – May 26, 2010
- "Senjou ni Saita Ichirin no Hana" – July 21, 2010
- "Last Vision For Last" – October 27, 2010
- "Honnou no DOUBT" (本能のDOUBT) – November 24, 2010
- "Shuumatsu no Fractal" (終末のフラクタル) – January 26, 2011
- "Rasen, Arui wa Seinaru Yokubou" (螺旋、或いは聖なる欲望) – April 27, 2011
- "Tomoshibi" – May 25, 2011
- "Blood teller" – November 9, 2011
- "Dead END" – January 25, 2012
- "Sōkyū no Hikari" – March 16, 2012
- "WHITE justice" – May 23, 2012
- "Realization" – August 8, 2012
- "God FATE" – January 23, 2013
- "wonder fang" – July 24, 2013
- "Blue Blaze" – October 23, 2013
- "Yasashisa no Tsubomi" – April 30, 2014
- "Tokyo Zero Hearts" – July 30, 2014

=== Albums ===
Polaris /2010
No.	Title	Length
1.	"Polaris"	05:14
2.	"mind as Judgment"
3.	"SERIOUS-AGE"
4.	"AROUSING SOUL"
5.	"Distance point"
6.	"泡沫の小鳥達"
7.	"scat blue"
8.	"ありがとう ~to dear you~"
9.	"Dark Side of the Light"
10.	"Day of the fate"
11.	"飛翔の刻"
12.	"fortitude"
13.	"I sing by my soul"
14.	"Errand"
15.	"spring ~君とのメロディ~"
16.	"希望の扉 ~All I can do is singing for you~"

ALIVE /2011
No.	Title	Length
1.	"ALIVE"
2.	"I don't know"
3.	"Last vision for last"
4.	"正直に生きろ!"
5.	"本能のDOUBT"
6.	"亡霊達よ野望の果てに眠れ"
7.	"灯-TOMOSHIBI-"
8.	"LOVED SEASON"
9.	"記憶の秘密"
10.	"しずかな蜜より赤い蜜"
11.	"DEAR BEST FRIEND"
12.	"INFINITE CRISIS"
13.	"螺旋、或いは聖なる欲望。"
14.	"MOTHER!"
15.	"素晴らしい世界へ"

PRISM /2013
No.	Title	Length
1.	"prism flower"
2.	"Blood teller"
3.	"蒼穹の光"
4.	"RED love"
5.	"crime of love"
6.	"WHITE justice"
7.	"HAPPY END"
8.	"moment"
9.	"創世のタナトス"
10.	"Realization"
11.	"Dead END"
12.	"RED decision"
13.	"promise you..."

=== Live ===
- "Flying Dutch Live Tour 2010 Polaris" – October 4, 2010
- "Anisama Girls Night Live" – October 31, 2010
- "Connichi – Kassel Germany" – September 8, 2012

=== Compilations ===
- Girls Bravo Image Vocal Collection Album Go! Go! Girls! (GIRLSブラボー イメージヴォーカルアルバム GO! GO! GIRLS!), released March 24, 2005 (Lantis)
  1. "Just Believe in Love"
- Elements Garden, released August 6, 2008 (King Records)
  1. "Never Slash!!"
  2. "Reconquista"
- Ga-rei Image Song Collection Yuri-mu Croquette (-喰霊-零- イメージソング集「百合ームコロッケ」), released December 25, 2008 (Lantis)
  1. "Dark Side of the Light"
  2. "Chinkon no Tabi e" (鎮魂の旅へ)
  3. "If"
  4. "Reincarnation"
  5. "Distance Point"
- Sora o Miageru Shōjo no Hitomi ni Utsuru Sekai Inspired Album (空を見上げる少女の瞳に映る世界 Inspired album), released March 25, 2009 (Lantis)
  1. "Fortitude"
- Valkyrie Complex Vocal Album (ヴァルキリーコンプレックス ボーカルアルバム), released July 24, 2009 (Lantis)
  1. "Conspire"
- Canaan Inspired Album, released November 11, 2009 (Lantis)
  1. "Mind as Judgment (Ballad) (Opening Theme's Ballad Version)" (mind as Judgment〜ballad〜 〜オープニングテーマのバラードバージョン〜)
  2. "My Real, Canaan's Battle (From Canaan BGM Main Theme)" (MY REAL 〜カナンの戦い 〜カナンBGMメインテーマより〜)
  3. "Hishō no Koku ~Alphard's theme~" (飛翔の刻 ~アルファルドのテーマ~)
  4. "Day of the Fate (Canaan VS Alphard Theme)" (Day of the fate ~カナンVSアルファルドのテーマ~)
  5. "Kibou no Sora (Siam's Theme)" (希望の空 ~シャムのテーマ~)
- Gundam Tribute from Lantis released December 9, 2009 (Lantis)
  1. "Z Toki o Koete" (Ζ・刻を越えて)

=== Other ===
- Katanagatari Episode 11 Dokutou Mekki Blu-ray Disc and DVD (Special Editions) Bonus CD, to be released February 2, 2011 (Aniplex)
  1. "Bourei-tachi yo Yabou no Hate ni Nemure" (亡霊達よ野望の果てに眠れ) – Katanagatari series ending theme No. 11
- Chaos Rings Original Soundtrack, released on iTunes
  1. Together at Dawn – Chaos Rings insert theme
- Grisaia no Meikyuu Soundtrack
  1. Sousei no Thanatos (創世のタナトス) Grisaia no Meikyuu insert theme
