= Aya Kamiki =

Japanese singer-songwriter (born 1985)

- 上木彩矢
- Born: Tsukada Ayako (塚田 綾子); September 10, 1985 (age 41); Sapporo, Hokkaido, Japan
- Other name: Klim (久里夢)
- Education: Hinode High School
- Occupations: Singer; songwriter; actress; model
- Years active: 2003–present
- Spouse: (m. 2020)
- Children: 1
- Musical career
- Genres: J-pop; rock
- Instruments: Vocals; piano; guitar; keyboards; marimba; vibraphone
- Labels: For Life; Weed; Giza Studio; Avex Trax; Pony Canyon
- Website: www.box-corporation.com/aya_kamiki

Aya Kamiki (上木 彩矢, Kamiki Aya; born September 10, 1985, in Sapporo, Hokkaido) is a Japanese singer, actress and model. Her music ranges from pop, rock to R&B. She resides in Osaka, and is signed with Tokyo-based AVEX recording label. She is the vocalist of the rock band Uroboros and the rock duo Sonic Lover Reckless with Lovebites guitarist Miyako.

== Biography ==
Kamiki learned to play the piano when she was 4 years old. In junior high school, she began singing live. Influenced by punk rock, she also learned how to play the guitar.

In 2005, Kamiki released her two mini-albums "Constellation" and "Rock On" from the independent record label Weed Records. Kamiki's singing career was mainly active in Osaka, where she garnered positive results. Her voice was so full of force that it was part of her reputation. She made appearances in music and fashion magazines, which caught people's attention.

In 2006, Kamiki signed on with Giza Studio and released her first major label single "Communication Break" on March 15. On April 12, her second single "Pierrot" was released. The song was respectively written and composed by B'z members Koshi Inaba and Tak Matsumoto, although the lyrics in Kamiki's version were slightly modified. It was released on the same day as the B'z single "ゆるぎないものひとつ" (Yuruginaimono Hitotsu), which contained "Pierrot" as its 2nd Beat (B-side). The single reached 9th place on the Oricon charts. Her third single "Mou Kimidake-wo Hanashitari-wa Shinai" peaked at the 11th place, and her first full album "Secret Code" debuted at 5th place. In order to promote Secret Code's release, Kamiki held two mini-concerts. One was as "Black Kamiki" and was performed at Tower Records in Shibuya. The other (later on the same day), was as "White Aya" and was performed at HMV in Shibuya. Entrance was free, provided that you had purchased Secret Code at the corresponding store.

Early 2007, Kamiki was one of the winners of the 21st Japan Gold Disc Award's New Artist of the Year. In 2009, she moved the Avex Trax label and before leaving Ginza Studio, she released a best album titled, "Greatest Best" and she released her 12th single named "WBX (W-Boiled Extreme)" on November 11.

She makes an appearance as an in-game character in the 2008 visual novel 428: Shibuya Scramble (later released internationally in 2018). She also sang its theme song "Sekai wa Sore demo Kawari wa Shinai" (世界はそれでも変わりはしない), known in English as "The World Doesn't Change So Easy", which was released as a single in December 2008.

In 2010, her fourth album, Individual Emotion, was released on January 27, and one track, "The Light" was released as a PV. Then on July 14, her 13th single, "Revolver" was released, then shortly after on August 11, she released her mini-album, "Gloriosa".

== Discography ==
=== Albums ===
==== Studio albums ====
Title	Details	Peak chart positions		Sales
Title	Details	JPN Oricon	JPN Sales (Note: The Billboard Japan Top Album Sales chart was established in January 2008.)	Sales
Secret Code	Released: July 12, 2006; Label: Giza Studio; Formats: CD, digital download	5	—	JPN: 65,000
Ashita no Tame ni: Forever More	Released: October 10, 2007; Label: Giza Studio; Formats: CD, digital download	8	—	JPN: 24,600
Are You Happy Now?	Released: September 10, 2008; Label: Giza Studio; Formats: CD, digital download	10	13	JPN: 18,000
Individual Emotion	Released: January 27, 2010; Label: Avex Trax; Formats: CD, digital download, streaming	23	27	JPN: 9,900

==== Compilation albums ====
Title	Details	Peak chart positions		Sales
Title	Details	JPN Oricon	JPN Sales	Sales
Aya Kamiki Greatest Best	Released: January 27, 2010; Label: Giza Studio; Formats: CD, digital download	30	33	JPN: 8,300
The Final Journey	Released: September 7, 2011; Label: Avex Trax; Formats: CD, digital download	69	83	JPN: 1,500

==== Video albums ====
Title	Details	Peak chart positions	Sales
Title	Details	JPN Oricon	Sales
Aya Kamiki First Live	Released: May 2, 2007; Label: B-Vision; Formats: DVD	3	JPN: 10,600
Aya Kamiki Music Video #1	Released: November 7, 2007; Label: Giza Studio; Formats: DVD	8	JPN: 6,900
The Final Journey -Final Edition-	Released: September 7, 2011; Label: Giza Studio; Formats: DVD	23	JPN: 900

=== Extended plays ===
Title	Details	Peak chart positions		Sales
Title	Details	JPN Oricon	JPN Sales	Sales
W.H.Y?	Released as Klim (久里夢); Released: March 24, 2004; Label: For Life; Formats: CD	—	—	
Constellation	Released: May 25, 2005; Label: Weed; Formats: CD	—	—	
Rock On	Released: September 21, 2005; Label: Weed; Formats: CD	—	—	
Gloriosa	Released: August 11, 2010; Label: Avex Trax; Formats: CD, digital download, streaming	39	75	JPN: 4,100
EVILÄLIVE	Released: March 9, 2011; Label: Avex Trax; Formats: CD, digital download, streaming	45	46	JPN: 2,600

=== Singles ===
Single #	Information	Sales
indie	"Breath": Released: May 21, 2003; Studio Album: N/A; Oricon Top 200 Weekly Peak: /	/ copies sold
Debut / 1st	"Communication Break" (1st Major): Released: March 15, 2006; Studio Album: Secret Code; Oricon Top 200 Weekly Peak: #48	7,825 copies sold
2nd	"Pierrot": Released: April 12, 2006; Studio Album: Secret Code; Oricon Top 200 Weekly Peak: #9	38,127 copies sold
3rd	"Mou Kimi Dake wo Hanashitari wa Shinai": Released: May 31, 2006; Studio Album: Secret Code; Oricon Top 200 Weekly Peak: #11	21,967 copies sold
4th	"Nemutteita Kimochi Nemutteita Kokoro": Released: November 1, 2006; Studio Album: Ashita no Tame ni ~Forever More~; Oricon Top 200 Weekly Peak: #19	12,605 copies sold
5th	"Misekake no I Love you": Released: May 23, 2007; Studio Album: Ashita no Tame ni ~Forever More~; Oricon Top 200 Weekly Peak: #24	9,505 copies sold
6th	"Ashita no Tame ni": Released: July 25, 2007; Studio Album: Ashita no Tame ni ~Forever More~; Oricon Top 200 Weekly Peak: #24	7,168 copies sold
7th	"SUNDAY MORNING": Released: March 5, 2008; Studio Album: Are you happy now?; Oricon Top 200 Weekly Peak: #28	5,885 copies sold
8th	"Kimi Sarishi Yuuwaku": Released: June 18, 2008; Studio Album: Are you happy now?; Oricon Top 200 Weekly Peak: #34	4,302 copies sold
9th	"Summer Memories": Released: August 6, 2008; Studio Album: Are you happy now?; Oricon Top 200 Weekly Peak: #35	5,469 copies sold
10th	"Sekai wa Sore demo Kawari wa Shinai": Released: December 3, 2008; Studio Album: AYA KAMIKI Greatest Best; Oricon Top 200 Weekly Peak: #42	4,378 copies sold
11th by Kamiki Aya and TAKUYA	"WBX (W-Boiled Extreme)": Released: November 11, 2009; Studio Album: Individual Emotion; Oricon Top 200 Weekly Peak: #8	53,886 copies sold
12th	"Revolver": Released: July 14, 2010; Studio Album: Gloriosa; Oricon Top 200 Weekly Peak: #34	2,351 copies sold
13th	"UNREAL": Released: May 9, 2012	/ copies sold
14th	"V/S": Released: November 21, 2012	/ copies sold

UNREAL and V/S singles were sold during live concerts; the title songs can be downloaded via iTunes.
