= Canaan (TV series) =

Japanese anime television series

- North American cover of the Blu-ray release featuring Alphard (left) and Canaan (right)

カナン (Kanan)
- Genre: Girls with guns; Mystery; Thriller
- Created by: Type-Moon
- Anime television series
- Directed by: Masahiro Andō
- Produced by: Hiroshi Kawamura; Jirō Ishii; Kei Fukura; Kenji Horikawa; Shigeru Saitō; Yasushi Ōshima
- Written by: Mari Okada
- Music by: Hikaru Nanase
- Studio: P.A. Works
- Licensed by: AUS: Siren Visual; NA: Sentai Filmworks; UK: MVM Films
- Original network: Tokyo MX, TVS, CTC, tvk, KTV, THK, AT-X, Anime Network
- Original run: July 4, 2009 – September 26, 2009
- Episodes: 13
- Manga
- Written by: Type-Moon
- Illustrated by: Akira Ishida
- Published by: Kadokawa Shoten
- Magazine: Comp Ace
- Original run: August 2009 – March 2011
- Volumes: 3
- Light novel
- Written by: Tomonori Sugihara
- Illustrated by: Kanami Sekiguchi
- Published by: Kadokawa Shoten
- Imprint: Kadokawa Sneaker Bunko
- Original run: January 1, 2010 – March 1, 2010
- Volumes: 2
- Manga

Canaan Sfill
- Written by: Chunsoft
- Illustrated by: Jun Sasameyuki
- Published by: Bandai Visual
- Magazine: Comic Gekkin
- Original run: March 1, 2010 – 2011
- Volumes: 2
- icon

Canaan is a Japanese anime television series, conceptualized by Type-Moon co-founders Kinoko Nasu and Takashi Takeuchi, based on the scenario that they created for the Wii visual novel 428: Shibuya Scramble, which is noted for being one of the few games to have been awarded a perfect score by games publication Famitsu. The series spawned manga and light novel adaptations.

Taking place two years after the events of 428: Shibuya Scramble, Canaan centers on three women, their connections to one another, and an upcoming anti-terrorism summit in Shanghai, China. The first woman is Canaan, a Middle Eastern assassin and mercenary. The second is Alphard Al Sheya, Canaan's rival and a skilled assassin who heads the terrorist organization known as 'Snake'. The final girl is Maria Ōsawa, a returning character from the Shibuya incident, who came to Shanghai with her fellow reporter, Minoru Minorikawa. Their subsequent encounters lead to armed interventions between Canaan and Alphard, along with the reveal of their deep and tragic past.

== Plot ==
Two years after the events of 428: Shibuya Scramble, Maria Ōsawa and Minoru Minorikawa are dispatched as reporters to Shanghai in order to cover the upcoming Shanghai NBCR International Anti-Terrorist Conference. Prior to their current assignment, both Maria and Minoru were survivors of the Shibuya bio-terrorism incident, where Maria was kidnapped by terrorists and was infected by the Ua virus but was cured by her scientist father using an experimental anti-Ua virus vaccine. On her first day in Shanghai, Maria is targeted by masked assassins but saved by a Middle Eastern girl named Canaan, whom she befriended in the Middle East prior to the events of 428: Shibuya Scramble and her Shanghai trip.

Their presence in the city is being overshadowed by a mysterious event being planned by Alphard, Canaan's rival. Unknown to the two, Alphard is preparing a big plot related to the anti-terrorist summit after being rescued by Cummings and Liang Qi, a pair of mercenaries and Alphard's allies. Maria's life was placed in danger once more when Snake assassins were dispatched to harm her, placing Canaan at the forefront of it all in order to protect her friend. Minoru investigates a strange purple mark that he spotted from one of the assassins Canaan had killed recently, tying it back to the events in Shibuya.

Canaan and Alphard continue to violently confront one another before and after the terrorist attack on the anti-terrorist summit, the latter trying to make Canaan fight her with all of her strength. The reason for their rivalry was Siam, a mercenary and mentor to Canaan, who was gunned down by Alphard during a joint mission together in an attempt to forge her own path without being influenced by Siam as she also was raised by him with the name Canaan once before she discarded it for her current name. Canaan later goes on a journey with Mino, Maria and several others to Western China where a new Ua virus was first used to find out about its origin and track down Alphard.

After Maria and Minoru made their safe return to Japan from their journey in China, Maria opened a photo gallery and reflected on the friendship she and Canaan shared. One of the portraits she had for public display was named Canaan. It consisted of pictures of Alphard, who was formerly known as Canaan, and the Canaan she knew back from her Middle East trip.

== Characters ==
Poster of the show's characters. From left to right: Nene, Santana, Hackō, Yunyun, Cummings, Liang Qi, Alphard, Canaan, Yuri Natsume, Maria Ōsawa and Minoru Minorikawa.

=== Main characters ===
Canaan (カナン, Kanan)
Voiced by: Miyuki Sawashiro (Japanese); Shelley Calene-Black (English)
Canaan is the titular character and main protagonist of the series, a mercenary currently operating in Shanghai. She was the only survivor of a village destroyed by war in the Middle East before being found and trained by Siam, who has her adopting the name Canaan. She developed a respect for her mentor during the course of her training and later to Alphard as well (Siam's former student who she saw as an older sister figure). But when Alphard betrayed both her and Siam during a mission and left Siam to die, Canaan was consumed by the quest for revenge. Canaan gets serious whenever she sees Alphard. As an elite mercenary, Canaan is also a skilled marksman and an expert of combat, her weapon of choice most of the time being a Beretta Px4 Type G 9 mm semi-automatic pistol. She has the ability to use synesthesia to aid her in combat, viewing the world in different colors to tell enemies from civilians. She is always seen with a red halterneck shirt and brown pants. On her left wrist, she wears a black tattoo that possibly completes a whole picture of a snake with the tattoo on Alphard's arm. She covers this tattoo with a layered red armband, which repeatedly gets ripped off during her fights.
Alphard Al Sheya (アルファルド・アル・シュヤ, Arufarudo Aru Shuya)
Voiced by: Maaya Sakamoto (Japanese); Lesley Pedersen (English)
The series' most prominent villain, Alphard is an attractive young woman who is both the leader of a terrorist organization called Snake (蛇, Hebi), which is responsible for both the Shibuya and Shanghai terrorist attacks and Canaan's arch-enemy. Once Siam's apprentice and known as Canaan, she has since thrown away the identity and adopted her current name. Prior to the events of 428: Shibuya Scramble, Alphard, Siam and Canaan were hired to hijack an armored military train containing the Ua virus. During the assignment Alphard betrayed her teammates when it was revealed their client ordered her to kill all witnesses, including them. She shot Siam and left him to die while escaping with the virus. She appears easily capable of taking down Canaan even though the latter uses her synesthesia, reasoning that she is no longer manipulated by feelings (unlike Canaan). She carries a FN Five-seveN USG 5.7 mm pistol as a sidearm. On her lower left arm, a strange tattoo is worn, and it possibly is a half of a whole picture of a tattoo if combined with the tattoo on Canaan's arm. However, she amputated this arm during her final battle with Canaan, later coming to be known as "the one-armed woman".
Maria Ōsawa (大沢 マリア, Ōsawa Maria)
Voiced by: Yoshino Nanjō (Japanese); Hilary Haag (English)
Usually seen smiling, Maria is one of the central characters of the series. Two years ago during the events of 428: Shibuya Scramble, she was abducted by Snake terrorists and they infected her with the Ua virus to force her father, Kenji Ōsawa, to make them a cure to the Ua virus to save her life. While her life was saved thanks to her father's anti-virus, the trauma she endured during the Shibuya incident made her suffer amnesia. As a result, she cannot remember certain events during that incident, including not remembering having met Alphard before. Prior to the Shibuya incident, she befriended Canaan after being saved from hoodlums during a trip somewhere in the Middle East. As her dream is to become a photographer, she became the partner of Minoru Minorikawa before the pair's assignment in Shanghai and her subsequent reuniting with Canaan. Several characters have made fun of her cowlick hairstyle and her relatively small bust size.

=== Secondary characters ===
Siam (シャム, Shamu)
Voiced by: Akio Ōtsuka (Japanese); Andrew Love (English)
An ex-mercenary who mentored both Canaan and Alphard. He rescued the young Canaan from the ruins of her home village, took her under his care, and trained her in the art of combat. Prior to the events of 428: Shibuya Scramble, he, Canaan and Alphard were hired to hijack an armed military train to steal the Ua virus it was carrying. He was shot by Alphard who revealed that their client had ordered her to kill all witnesses on the train; this included him and Canaan. Alphard left him to die while a bomb was placed to blow up the train. However, Siam ordered Canaan to stop Alphard from escaping with the Ua virus. He disarmed the bomb before bleeding to death. This event is the main reason of contention between Canaan and Alphard. Even though he is dead, his "spirit" appears to both Canaan and Alphard.
Minoru Minorikawa (御法川 実, Minorikawa Minoru)
Voiced by: Kenji Hamada (Japanese); David Matranga (English)
One of the main characters in the original 428: Shibuya Scramble and a survivor of the Shibuya incident, Minorikawa is a hot-headed reporter who is assigned to Shanghai along with Maria, who (along with Canaan) nicknames him 'Mino-san'. He acts as both Maria's supervisor and friend as he and Maria work to find out more about the strange cases in Shanghai.
Liang Qi (リャン・チー, Ryan Chī)
Voiced by: Rie Tanaka (Japanese); Jessica Boone (English)
One of Alphard's top lieutenants who affectionately refers to Alphard as an elder sister, she was hinted to have been with Alphard ever since Alphard and Siam had gone their separate ways. She appears calm and even-tempered, but is in fact unwavering, merciless, and very much obsessed with admiring and idolizing Alphard to the point of being in love with her. To her frustration, however, Alphard does not reciprocate and instead ignores or even proceeds to ridicule her from time to time. Her obsession with Alphard leads her into a mad desire to kill Canaan, believing that Alphard will then pay more attention to her. Halfway through the series, she eventually does lose her calm demeanor and acts irrationally, resulting to her death at the hands of Cummings, a man she supposedly worked as secretary for, and Alphard herself.
Yunyun (ユンユン, Yunyun)
Voiced by: Haruka Tomatsu (Japanese); Serena Varghese (English)
Born Song Yun Mi, this eccentric and energetic young girl is one of the Borners, surviving test subjects of Snake's Ua virus experiment. The Ua mutation did not appear to have granted her any extraordinary ability save for an additional appendix; however, her dependence on anti-viral medicine provided by Liang Qi allowed her to be treated as a disposable pawn.
Cummings (カミングズ, Kaminguzu)
Voiced by: Tōru Ōkawa (Japanese); Andy McAvin (English)
Cummings is the public head of the private military company Daedala, a front organization of the Snakes, staffed by members of the terrorist organization. Within Snake, however, he serves under Liang Qi, whom he is in love with, as an adviser and is often her primary victim of venting frustrations from being unable to win over Alphard's attention, usually as airsoft gun target practice which he does not mind as he is a masochist. Publicly, Cummings is accompanied by a Snake member named Sokinson (ソッキンソン, Sokkinson) as his personal bodyguard. He kills Liang Qi in order to free her of her pain and in return she says she loves him (as that was his request). In the end it appears he has become a monk.
Santana (サンタナ, Santana)
Voiced by: Hiroaki Hirata (Japanese); Leraldo Anzaldua (English)
Santana runs a karaoke cosplay bar in the streets of Shanghai while working with Hakko to assist other Borners and Unblooms to find refuge from Snake. In addition, he is an acquaintance of Natsume and is rather protective of Hakko, willing to enter into a physical altercation with Minoru for asking her too many questions. He assists Canaan, Minoru, and Maria to revisit the destroyed hometown village and the factory. He confronts Liang Qi at the factory, but is captured. Liang Qi manipulates Hakko into accidentally mortally wounding Santana with her deadly voice. Santana dies in Hakko's arms as she whispers her love to him.
Hakko (ハッコー, Hakko)
Voiced by: Mamiko Noto (Japanese); Emily Neves (English)
A Borner with the ability to inflict brain damage with her voice (which can be fatal if wholly unleashed). Usually seen behaving childlike, she works as a cosplay waitress in Santana's bar as well as his assistant, having since developed feelings for him. Unfortunately, since she is unable to speak out without hurting him, he remains under the impression that Hakko has never forgiven him for his role in the destruction of her home village. She accompanies the protagonists on a goal to liberate a factory used for creating Snakes subordinates. There she is tricked by Liang Qi into killing Santana with her voice, causing Hakko to become depressed. Near the end of the series, she confesses her love to a dying Santana and remains with his corpse in the factory as it collapses.
Yuri Natsume (夏目 ユリ, Natsume Yuri)
Voiced by: Junko Minagawa (Japanese); Kaytha Coker (English)
Natsume is a Japanese woman who acts as both a representative of Canaan's employer and her informant, working for a Non-Governmental Organization called OWL. She is calm and punctual, as attested by the way she interacts with Canaan despite initially being very much annoyed by the latter's single-mindedness for avenging Siam's death. She is an acquaintance of Santana and usually advises him to treat Hakko well. It is later revealed that she really works for the Defense Intelligence Headquarters with the rank of Major, using the Ua virus incidents and manipulating the US and China in order to get Japan to an advantageous position in the international politics arena.

=== Supporting characters ===
Kenji Ōsawa (大沢 賢治, Ōsawa Kenji)
Voiced by: Atsushi Ono (Japanese)
A biological researcher and also one of the protagonists of 428: Shibuya Scramble, he is the man that was able to cure the Ua virus which he uses his knowledge to save his twin daughters, Maria and Hitomi during the Shibuya incident who were both affected with the Ua virus (Hitomi is one of the main characters in the game). He makes a cameo during the terrorist attack on the Shanghai International Conference Hall, bringing in stockpiles of Ua anti-virus medicine after a staged assassination.
Jin (Taxi Driver) (ジン(タクシードライバー), Jin (Takushī Doraibā))
Voiced by: Jōji Nakata (Japanese); Rob Mungle (English)
Maria and Minorikawa first encounter him when they are pursued by assassins sent by Snake. Since then, he has met up with them a few more times. He drives like a maniac and idolizes a singer named Nene. He is based on Hachirou Kimizuka, the taxi driver from the original 428: Shibuya Scramble game.

== Development ==
The series was known in its initial planning stages as 428 the animation when it was first announced in Newtype's October 2008 issue and by Sega at the 2008 Tokyo Games Show, where a trailer for the series was aired and announced as an adaptation of Type-Moon's original scenario for the game.

The title was subsequently changed in December of the same year to Canaan, with Sega also announcing that they would host a booth for the series in the 2008 Winter Comiket, where DVDs featuring specials and trailers for the show, packaged with a booklet featuring original character designs by Takashi Takeuchi and completed animation designs by animator Kanami Sekiguchi would be featured, along with CDs of the theme song, "Arousing Soul", performed by Faylan. A seventeen-second promo was subsequently streamed on the series' official website, featuring the dual DVD/CD release at Comiket.

It was announced in 2009 that the show's would be compiled into three films, but they have not been released.

== Media ==
=== Anime ===
The series was animated by the animation studio P.A. Works, directed by Masahiro Andō, who previously directed the Bones movie Sword of the Stranger, and features series composition by Mari Okada, who previously wrote Vampire Knight and True Tears, and also features animation character designs by Kanami Sekiguchi and original music composed by Hikaru Nanase. Bee Train Digital contributed 2D graphic works for the ending theme. The opening theme is "Mind as Judgment" by Faylan and the ending theme is "My heaven" by Annabel.

Sentai Filmworks licensed the series in North America, and anime distributor Section23 Films released the series on October 26, 2010, on DVD and Blu-ray Disc. The Anime Network streamed the series on their website and their On Demand service for Cable and Satellite users. In Germany, Austria and in German-speaking parts of Switzerland, Canaan was released by Universum Anime on four DVDs. They are retailed with original Japanese and dubbed German audio with volume one having episode one, volume two having episodes two to five, volume three having episodes six to nine and volume four having episodes ten to thirteen. In Taiwan, Hong Kong, Macau, China and in Chinese-speaking communities in Malaysia and Singapore, the series is licensed for distribution by Mighty Media, which has released the series in a DVD Box Collection featuring all the episodes.

=== Printed media ===
A manga adaptation, illustrated by Akira Ishida, was serialized in Kadokawa Shoten's Comp Ace magazine between the August 2009 and March 2011 issues. Three tankōbon volumes were released between January 26, 2010, and February 26, 2010. Another manga titled Canaan Sfill (CANAAN スフィル), written by Chunsoft and illustrated by Jun Sasameyuki, was serialized in Bandai Visual's web magazine Comic Gekkin from March 1, 2010, to 2011. Two volumes were released on December 10, 2010 and May 10, 2011. Ichijinsha published an anthology titled Canaan Comic Anthology (CANAAN コミックアンソロジー) on September 24, 2009

Two light novels were released by Kadokawa Shoten, the first on January 1, 2010 and the second on March 1, 2010. The Canaan Official Fanbook was released by publisher Ichijinsha on February 12, 2010. It contains character sketches of the various characters in Canaan with episode commentaries and interviews from the show's cast and crew.

=== Other ===
Two volumes of Canaan radio DJ CDs, known officially as Canaan DJCD Shanghai Hanten de Aimasho (CANAAN DJCD上海飯店で会いましょう), were released on December 23, 2009, and February 24, 2010.

Several Canaan figures were released, concentrating on Canaan and Alphard. A poseable Figma Canaan figure was made by Miki Asai and released by Max Factory in November 2009. Three PVC-made figures were released by the Good Smile Company. The first PVC figure was a Nendoroid Canaan, sculpted by Reiichi Ito and released in December 2009. A regular Canaan figure soon followed, sculpted by Kunihito Iwamoto and released in January 2010. A regular Alphard figure, also sculpted by Iwamoto, was released in March 2010. Both of the figures are made on 1/8 scale.

== Reception ==
Canaan's DVD volume one was on the top 30 Japanese Animation DVD Ranking from October 19–25, 2009. In the Japan Animation Blu-ray Disc Ranking, DVD volume one limited edition was third on the top ten list from October 19–25, 2009, followed by DVD volume two limited edition at eighth place in the top ten. The limited edition release of Blu-ray volume six was ranked third on the top ten Japan Animation Blu-ray Disc Ranking from March 15–21, 2010.

At the fourth annual Seiyu Awards, Miyuki Sawashiro was announced to be the Best Leading Actress for her role as Canaan. Canaan was awarded at the 13th Japan Media Arts Festival Awards as part of Jury Recommended Works in Long Animation.

Theron Martin of Anime News Network reviewed the anime, stating that while some elements are typical, it does "break new ground" in the sense that Canaan can "perceive the world differently from an average person," perceiving moods of people as colors, allowing her to find enemies, see her "most beloved person" (Maria), while praising the "fluidity and expansiveness" of the anime's art style, and music score. Luke Carroll, another reviewer from ANN, also gave a positive assessment. He wrote about the "possessive love" that Liang Qi has for her sister (and the series antagonist), Alphard, the action scenes met with well put together scores, and noted some plot holes.
