= Annabel (singer) =

Japanese singer (born 1984)

- Born: March 18, 1984 (age 42); Buenos Aires, Argentina
- Genres: J-pop
- Occupation: Singer
- Years active: 2005–present
- Label: Lantis
- Website: annabel.jp

Annabel (born March 18, 1984) is an Argentine–Japanese anisong singer signed to Lantis.

== Biography ==
Although most personal information about her is unknown, in 2012, she revealed via letter her real name to a famous radio station in Tokyo, and that her real given name is also Annabel. Her father is Japanese while her mother is Argentinian.

She began her musical career in 2005. In 2006, she and singer Nagi Yanagi formed the unit Binaria; to date, they have released 13 albums. In 2007, she formed another unit with singer Bermei.inazawa called anNina. As anNina, the duo performed the ending themes to the second and third seasons of Higurashi When They Cry. In 2009 she started her career as a solo singer.

Her first song that used to anime theme not commonly mentioned, but in 2009 "My Heaven" which used as the ending theme for anime television series CANAAN catch so much attention. Due to her rise in popularity, she started performing theme songs for anime series. Her first solo single was "Anamnesis," which is used as the ending theme to the 2012 anime television series Another; the single for "Anamnesis" was released on February 8, 2012. Annabel released her second single "Above Your Hand" on May 23, 2012, which is used as the ending theme for the anime television series Sankarea. Her third single, "Signal Graph," was released on July 25, 2012, which is used as the opening theme for the anime television series Love, Elections & Chocolate. She released her first solo album Miniascape on November 28, 2012.

Her sixth single "Small Worldrop" was released on April 24, 2013, used as the opening theme for anime Red Data Girl. The seventh single, "Alternative", by Annabel was released on August 7, 2013, was used as the ending theme for the reboot of the anime Rozen Maiden. Her eighth single "Yoru no Kuni" was released on August 26, 2015. The lead track Yoru no Kuni was used as the ending theme for the anime Gangsta. Also in 2015, she sang the vocals for the theme song of the 3DS game, 7th Dragon III Code:VFD of the 7th Dragon series.

In 2016, she formed the band siraph with Masayuki Hasuo and Masaaki Yamasaki (former School Food Punishment) and Yoshimasa Terui (haisuinonasa) who were the member of her backup band.

== Discography ==
=== Albums ===
Year	Album details	Peak Oricon chart positions
2012	Miniascape: Released: November 28, 2012; Label: Lantis (LACA-35258, LACA-15258); Format: CD, CD+DVD	102

=== Singles ===
Year	Song	Peak Oricon chart positions	Album
2009	"My heaven"	67	Miniascape
2009	"Light of Dawn"	—	Miniascape
2012	"Anamnesis"	104	Miniascape
2012	"Above your hand"	96	Miniascape
2012	"Signal Graph"	39	Miniascape
2013	"Small Worldrop"		
2015	"Yoru no Kuni"		
"—" denotes releases that did not chart.

=== Other album appearances ===
Year	Song	Album	Notes	Ref.
2009	"Sayonara no Tsuzuki e"	Drama CD: Bungaku Shōjo to Shinigatari no Piero Zenpen	Theme song on a drama CD for the Book Girl series.	
2009	"Kibō Nochi (Canaan BGM Main Theme yori)" "Synesthesia (Canaan no Theme)" "Yawarakana na Hikari no Naka de (Maria no Theme)" "Ai no Kotoba (Hakko no Theme)" "Shanghai Biyori" (Yun Yun no Theme)"	Canaan Inspired Album	Songs related to the anime television series Canaan.	
2009	"My heaven"	Canaan Original Soundtrack	TV-size version theme song to Canaan anime television series.	
2010	"Sayonara no Tsuzuki e"	Drama CD: Bungaku Shōjo to Uekawaku Ghost Zenpen	Theme song on a drama CD for the Book Girl series.	
2010	"Midoriiro no Yume"	Heart to Heart (from iyunaline to solfa 2)		
2010	"Light of Dawn"	Tatakau Shisho: The Book of Bantorra Original Soundtrack	TV-size version theme song to Tatakau Shisho: The Book of Bantorra anime television series.	
2010	"Photograph"	Narcissu: Moshimo Ashita ga Aru Nara Portable Vocal Album	Image song to the visual novel Narcissu: Moshimo Ashita ga Aru Nara Portable	
2010	"Stargazer"	Florish (from iyunaline to solfa 3)		
2010	"Kineorama" "Hakumei"	Hanayaka Nari, Waga Ichizoku Drama CD: Nigiwai Maseu, Hoshi Furu Seiya ni	Theme song on a drama CD for Hanayaka Nari, Waga Ichizoku visual novel.	
2010	"Soshita Mata, Koko Kara" "Nagareru Sora ni"	Clock Zero: Shūen no Ichibyō Original Soundtrack	Theme songs to Clock Zero: Shūen no Ichibyō PlayStation 2 video game.	
2011	"Abysmal Noise"	Hekikai no Aion Drama CD	Theme song on a drama CD for Aion manga.	
2011	"Akashi"	Katanagatari Kakyokushū Sono Ni	Theme song to Katanagatari anime television series.	
2011	"Sasoi no Seitei (Iriya mie Lip-Aura)" "Kegareta Hakoniwa (Serju ol Ieldis)"	Kasō Shōjo: Lip-Aura Gensō Kakyoku Shū	Theme songs to drama CD Kasō Shōjo: Lip-Aura.	
2011	"Perfect Trap"	Mirai Nikki Inspired Album Vol. 1: Ingaritsu Noise	Image song to Future Diary anime television series.	
2011	"Reimei" "Seiro Kōkō" "Kaneorama" "Hakumei"	Hanayaka Nari, Waga Ichizoku: Ending Shudaika Shū	Theme song collection to the Hanayaka Nari, Waga Ichizoku visual novel.	
2012	"Seitan no Facade"	Apriori	Barbarian on the Groove album.	
2013	"Shall We Dance"	"Phantasmagoria / Shall We Dance"	Split single with Ceui for original video animation series Hanayaka Nari, Waga Ichizoku: Kinetograph.	

=== Independent releases ===
- Autonomia (March 9, 2008)
- Noctiluca (December 31, 2010)
- "Ignis" (May 1, 2011)
- R.m.k (July 29, 2011)
- "Memory Cycle of a Sentimentalist" (October 30, 2011)
- "Debris" (April 30, 2012)
- "syncretism" (2014)
- "Country of the Night" (2015)
