= 428: Shibuya Scramble =

2008 video game

- Developers: Chunsoft: Wii/PS3/PSP/iOS/Android Chunsoft; PS4/Windows Abstraction Games
- Publishers: Sega: Wii; JP: Sega; PS3/PSP/iOS; JP: Spike PlayStation 4; WW: Spike Chunsoft; EU: Ravenscourt Microsoft Windows; WW: Spike Chunsoft
- Directors: Takeshi Furuta; Ayumu Iino
- Producer: Koichi Nakamura
- Designer: Tsuyoshi Furuta
- Programmer: Motoki Kaneda
- Artist: Hiro Nakamura
- Writers: Koichiro Ito; Yukinori Kitajima; Takemaru Abiko; Kinoko Nasu
- Composers: Naoki Satō; Hideki Sakamoto; Shingo Yasumoto
- Platforms: Wii; PlayStation 3; PlayStation Portable; iOS; Android; PlayStation 4; Microsoft Windows
- Release: Wii: JP: December 4, 2008; PlayStation 3: JP: September 3, 2009; PlayStation Portable: JP: September 17, 2009; iOS, Android: JP: November 3, 2011; PlayStation 4: NA: September 4, 2018; JP: September 6, 2018; EU: September 21, 2018; Microsoft Windows: WW: September 4, 2018; JP: September 6, 2018
- Genres: Visual novel Adventure; Interactive film
- Mode: Single-player

428: Shibuya Scramble (Note: Known in Japan as 428: Fūsa Sareta Shibuya de (428 〜封鎖された渋谷で〜; lit. 428: In a Blockaded Shibuya)) is a visual novel adventure video game produced by Koichi Nakamura with Jiro Ishii serving as executive producer, developed by Nakamura's company Chunsoft, and initially published by Sega, originally in Japan for the Wii on December 4, 2008. The game was ported by Spike to the PlayStation 3 and PlayStation Portable in September 2009. A version for iOS and Android was released in November 2011. PlayStation 4 and Microsoft Windows versions were released internationally in September 2018.

428 is set in the Shibuya ward of Tokyo where the narrative is presented using a combination of scrolling text, live action stills and video sequences. The game shares many story and gameplay elements with Chunsoft's 1998 sound novel game Machi, the most prominent being the locale, Shibuya. Although Chunsoft does not openly state 428 is a sequel, the game contains numerous references to Machi, and an early marketing slogan reads "Breaking a long silence, Shibuya gets going again."

The game has received high praise from critics, earning a perfect score in Famitsu Weekly, Japan's largest circulating video game magazine, as well as acclaim from international publications. The game also features a special scenario contributed by Kinoko Nasu and Takashi Takeuchi of Type-Moon fame, who wrote and provided character designs for it respectively. This scenario by Type-Moon got a sequel as an anime television series titled Canaan, which aired in Japan from July to September 2009. A series of four novels based on the game were published by Kodansha between the months of September and December 2009.

A successor to the game, titled Shibuya Scramble Stories, was announced in 2025 by most of the original team under a crowdfunding project.

== Gameplay ==
The game's Time Chart Mode, which allows players to change events by using the chart

428 is a visual novel adventure game where players take part in events from the perspectives of multiple protagonists, all acting in parallel with no knowledge of each other. Set in the modern Japanese city of Shibuya, Tokyo, the characters are involved in a mystery that cannot be solved without their interactions, and the plot is advanced by following clues found within the game's text and accompanying video sequences and making decisions on which path each protagonist should follow. Depending on the player's choices, a number of new scenarios become available, which ultimately lead to different outcomes and endings. The game has over a hundred alternate story pathways and 87 different possible endings.

=== Parallel gameplay mechanic ===
Players read through and switch between multiple stories that take place in the same timeframe, each seen from a different character's point of view. Decisions made in one character's story can inadvertently affect the story of another character in unforeseen ways. The format is similar to earlier non-linear visual novels with multiple perspectives, such as Machi (1998) and EVE Burst Error (1995), and can also be compared to non-linear hyperlink films such as Pulp Fiction (1994), Magnolia (1999) or Vantage Point (2008).

For instance, the game opens with a detective (protagonist #1) waiting for a kidnapper to pick up the ransom money, which is being carried by a girl. Another character, a young man out for a walk (protagonist #2), happens to encounter the scene. Protagonist #2 now has a choice to approach the ransom-carrying girl or not; If he approaches, his story reaches a dead end by being wrongfully arrested, but not only that, the detective's story also reaches a dead end by making the wrongful arrest.

The player's role is to figure out whose actions are affecting whom, and find the right choices to lead every protagonist to the conclusions of their storylines. The game offers a time chart screen where the events of all the protagonists' stories are listed in chronological order.

Blue-colored text is interspersed within the body text. The colored text, called Tips, can be selected like a hyperlink. Tips, when selected, provide a short page of explanatory text, much like a tooltip. Tips can reveal the definition of a technical term, provide some insight on the topic, or just provide a short digression from the story at hand. Red-colored text, also selectable, marks the name of a different protagonist and allows the player to jump from one protagonist to another. Jumping from red text is often the only way to make a character's story move forward.

The game unfolds in a ten-hour period, which begins at 10:00AM of April 28 and ends at 8:00PM. The game is broken up into one-hour segments. Leading every protagonist to the end of the hour unlocks the next hour to be played.

== Story ==
A major event that could jolt the world has been triggered in the streets of Shibuya. Five main characters have 10 hours to come together and solve the mystery behind what originally seemed like an ordinary ransom kidnap case.

The game is a crime thriller, but has multiple scenarios that cover several different narrative genres. For example, Shinya Kano's scenario is a hardboiled cop thriller, Tama's scenario is a slapstick comedy, and Osawa's scenario is a psychological horror.

=== Characters ===
- Shinya Kano (加納 慎也, Kanō Shin'ya)

Portrayed by: Kousei Amano
A young detective from the Shibuya Police Department, Kano is one of the detectives assigned to a stakeout involving Hitomi Osawa, a young woman whose twin sister Maria was kidnapped for ransom. The kidnapper had specified that Hitomi bring the money to a hand-off location outside of Shibuya Station. When the criminal shows up and runs off with the money, Kano takes chase.

- Achi Endo (遠藤 亜智, Endō Achi)

Portrayed by: Yuto Nakamura
A boy who loves Shibuya more than anyone else, Achi is the former head of S.O.S., the most influential street clan in Shibuya. He has since left S.O.S. and now spends his days cleaning up the streets and picking up trash. During his daily street cleaning routine, he encounters and saves Hitomi from a gunman, and the two go on the run to evade her assassin.

- Kenji Osawa (大沢 賢治, Ōsawa Kenji)

Portrayed by: Takuji Oyama
A virus expert and the father of Hitomi and Maria Osawa. As the lab director of Okoshi Pharmaceutical, Osawa leads a hermit-like life. A week after his US business trip, he receives a series of mysterious e-mails that indicate someone had conducted an unauthorized clinical trial of an antiviral drug he had been researching.

- Minoru Minorikawa (御法川 実, Minorikawa Minoru)

Portrayed by: Fumio Kitagami
A hot headed freelance writer, Minorikawa receives a desperate phone call from his former superior, Teruo Toyama. Toyama, now the president of a small publishing company, was swamped in debt and now forced to complete the latest issue of his magazine in a single day. Minorikawa offers to help finish the magazine.

- Tama (タマ)

Portrayed by: Yumi Sumimoto
A mysterious person in a cat suit. Tama, a person of unknown identity, is working inside a cat suit as a by-the-day temp worker in order to buy a strange necklace she found at a general store. She begins her work of promoting a diet drink, "Burning Hammer."

Additionally, the musician Aya Kamiki (上木彩矢) played herself, appears over the course of the game, and performs the main theme "The World Doesn't Change So Easy" (世界はそれでも変わりはしない, Sekai wa Sore Demo Kawari wa Shinai).

=== Main story ===
On April 27, college student Maria Osawa was kidnapped on her way to a mixer, which included her twin sister, Hitomi, and her professor. The kidnappers contacted the Osawa residence and demanded for ¥50,000,000 to be delivered by Hitomi at the Statue of Hachikō in Shibuya. The police force, including Detective Shinya Kano, surrounded Hachiko the next morning to catch the kidnappers. Once contact was made and the kidnapper ran with the case, Kano chased after them. Meanwhile, former gang member Achi Endo witnesses a Man with a Cane and a gun approach Hitomi, and Achi attempts to intercept and take Hitomi to safety. She explains that the kidnappers told her to find and enter a blue van, and Achi agrees to take her there, all while avoiding the Man with the Cane.

At the Osawa residence, Maria and Hitomi's father, virologist Kenji Osawa, receives a threatening email with images of unauthorized clinical trials on an antiviral drug he had worked on for a virus called the Ua Virus. Elsewhere, freelance journalist Minoru Minorikawa offers his services to his former boss, Teuro Toyama, in filling 12 pages for his next issue of his magazine, with the proof deadlined for 8 PM, and enlists the help of novice Chiaki Iso as they search for stories to write.

That same day, an amnesiac girl nicknamed Tama applies for a job in a mascot costume at a sales demo, in order to buy a special necklace. However, her boss Jun'ichi Yanagashita appears to be a swindler, and her costume's zipper is stuck. Minorikawa attends the sales demo, which ends catastrophically, but after a long morning of work, Tama is paid and Minorikawa gets his interview with Yanagashita. With the necklace purchased, she realizes her costume's zipper has gone loose, taking it off and revealing the amnesiac Tama as Maria Osawa.

Kano pursues the kidnappers and eventually is assisted by an American from the US Embassy named Jack Stanley. They find the kidnappers dead in their hideout, attacked by someone named "Canaan." As Achi and Hitomi are pursued by remaining kidnappers, a woman appears, naming herself Canaan and Maria's close friend from overseas, and reveals it's her fault that Maria was kidnapped. They eventually approach the blue van, but it explodes with Achi, Hitomi, Canaan, Minorikawa, Chiaki, and Maria nearby. Maria is held hostage by the Man with the Cane and Minorikawa spies on Stanley and Kano. Stanley reveals he is a CIA agent hunting down a criminal named Alphard, who had infected Maria with the Ua virus, let her loose in the city, and seeks Hitomi to steal the antiviral hidden in her blood.

Achi and Hitomi head to the hospital to check on Achi's sister, Suzune, who has been dying from a heart condition, and had collapsed earlier that day. When the doctor informs his that his father, Daisuke, stated a perfect donor would arrive soon, Achi discovers that Hitomi's blood-type is the rare Bombay blood, a perfect match for Suzune, revealing his father had hired the Man with the Cane to kill her. Kano meets up with Detective Tateno —the Man with the Cane— who holds Maria hostage and reveals that the Endos were his childhood friends, and he seeks Hitomi to cure Suzune. Maria remembers her past, and escapes when Canaan attacks Tateno. Maria, Hitomi, Achi, and Stanley arrive at the Endo residence, where Daisuke reveals that he worked with Alphard but mistakenly kidnapped the wrong twin. As Kano and Canaan arrive, Maria collapses as the virus activates, and Alphard makes contact, offering the password for the antiviral in exchange for a sample of Hitomi's blood.

Achi seeks help from his former gang, the S.O.S., to apprehend Alphard, and with Minorikawa's intervention they accept. Canaan and the reformed Tateno take Maria to the lab to rendezvous with Osawa, while Hitomi, Kano, Achi, and S.O.S. head to the Statue of Hachikō to meet with Alphard: the twins' college professor. They apprehend him, prevent a Ua outbreak in the public square, and obtain the password, but it is revealed that "Alphard" had been carrying a bomb. Stanley discovered the truth: "Canaan" is not the real Canaan, but the real Alphard, and her true target is the laboratory. Stanley rushes to the lab to apprehend Alphard with Tateno's help, Osawa administers the cure to Maria, and Kano and Achi (with Minorikawa's help) stop the bomb using dry ice.

Maria wakes up and realizes that if Alphard is pretending to be Canaan, then the real Canaan must already be dead. In the Normal Ending, Maria attempts to kill Alphard, but she retaliates and kills Osawa instead; the CIA arrive and arrest Alphard, only to reveal they were working with her as they head to the airport. In the True Ending, Maria doesn't attempt to kill Alphard, and eventually receives a call from the real Canaan, alive and well; at the airport, Alphard confronts the real Canaan, and they draw their guns at each other as a gunshot is let loose.

=== Bonus scenarios ===
The Suzune Scenario is unlocked with the Normal Ending and with 50 Bad Endings obtained. Suzune befriends a boy named Takuya Kazama at the hospital, suffering from Wilson's disease. One day Takuya is rushed to the ICU, and three weeks later Suzune collapses from a serious heart attack. Suzune wakes up and learns that Takuya had died and his heart had been transplanted in her. His blood type was also Bombay, and he had held on until his 15th birthday, on 4/28, to be able to legally sign as an organ donor and donate his heart to Suzune. Suzune decides to continue living, with Takuya always with her.

The Canaan Scenario is unlocked with the True Ending. A survivor of the Iraq War and an outbreak of the Ua Virus, Canaan was taken in by a mercenary named Siam to train as a child soldier. With her special ability of synesthesia, she is able to discover foes by their "color" and other hidden elements with her senses. During one mission, Canaan and Siam take a train from Iraq to Jordan to steal a package, aided by Siam's former apprentice Sadaqah. Canaan and Sadaqah infiltrate a transport carriage, but Canaan discovers that the package is a sample of the Ua Virus. Armed men attack the train, and Sadaqah betrays and kills Siam, revealing her new name as Alphard. After massacring the rest of the passengers, Alphard escapes, but not before Canaan takes the case transporting the virus from her. Four years later, Canaan arrives in Japan to stop Alphard's plans to release the virus, only to call Maria and learn Alphard had already been defeated. Canaan heads to the airport for their final showdown.

The Mean Clean Scenario is unlocked with the Suzune Scenario and the Canaan Scenario cleared, and triggered over the course of the game. After the van explosion, the water-bottle-themed mascot Mean Clean escapes from Achi's shirt design and discovers a pollution monster seeking to cover all of Shibuya in garbage. Mean Clean and his friends race around Shibuya cleaning the trash in the city and confront the giant monster. Using dry ice, Mean Clean sacrifices himself in a dry ice explosion inside the monster's mouth, saving the city from pollution.

The Conspiracy Scenario is unlocked by 100% completing the rest of the game and triggering a secret transmission. Koichi Nakamura, chairman of Spike Chunsoft, reveals he has been imprisoned and forced to make games for an impostor Nakamura, but was able to hide a secret message in a mini-game created for 428: Shibuya Scramble based on the game Door Door. The True Conspiracy Scenario is unlocked afterwards, obtained with a secret password. Yukinori Kitajima, writer for 428: Shibuya Scramble, reveals the previous message is a lie created by Nakamura, and that Kitajima was kidnapped years ago, alongside Takemaru Abiko and Kinoko Nasu, replaced with fakes in public, and forced to make games for them. He had already implanted a similar message in a previous game, and he informs the player that 428: Shibuya Scramble has been implanted with electromagnetic waves that could lead to brainwashing, and warns them that Nakamura's agents may have replaced someone close to them and are attempting to replace the player themself.

== Development ==
During the visual novel's development, a total of 120,000 live-action still pictures were shot. The live-action video and pictures were shot over a period of two months, before being edited for a further three months.

According to Koichi Nakamura, he mentions that the logistical challenge is on putting up visual novel scenes set in Shibuya since the police did not allow them to do so. This forced the crew to improvise by having some of the staff block the officers in arresting them for illegally shooting scenes in the ward.

== Release ==
The Wii version was later released under Nintendo's "Everyone's Recommendation Selection" line of budget titles.

The game was later ported to the PlayStation Portable and PlayStation 3 and released in September 2009. A version for iOS was released in November 2011.

Spike Chunsoft released the game in English for the PlayStation 4 in North America on September 4, 2018 and worldwide for Microsoft Windows on the same day; Koch Media plan to release the PlayStation 4 version in Europe on September 21 in a partnership with Spike Chunsoft. David Kracker, a localization director at Spike Chunsoft, "made it [his] mission" to localize the game when he joined the company. Netherlands-based Abstraction Games handled the porting process. Kajiya Productions provided the localization script with Kevin Frane as translator and Alexander O. Smith as editor.

== Music ==
The singer Aya Kamiki sang the theme song of the game, entitled "Sekai wa Sore demo Kawari wa Shinai" (世界はそれでも変わりはしない). The single was released on December 3, 2008. The music video features some scenes of the game.

Aya Kamiki participated in the promotion of the game at Shibuya where she performed the theme song on December 4, 2008.

== Reception ==
Reception

Aggregate score
Aggregator	Score
Metacritic	85/100

Review scores
Publication	Score
Destructoid	8.5/10
Famitsu	10/10, 10/10, 10/10, 10/10
GamesMaster	88%
GameSpot	8/10
IGN	8/10
PlayStation Official Magazine – UK	8/10
Gameblog	9/10
Hardcore Gamer	4.5/5
PlayStation LifeStyle	10/10
RPGFan	87%
RPG Site	10/10
Vandal	8.5/10

The Wii version of 428 was the eighth best-selling game in Japan during its week of release, selling 34,000 units. Year-end sales of the game totalled 53,315 units. In Japan, the game has sold 181,276 retail copies across all platforms, including 179,269 copies for the Wii, PS3 and PSP by 2012, and 2,007 copies for the PS4 in 2018. According to Steam Spy, the PC release has sold up to 20,000 copies on Steam. Koichi Nakamura said that game's development has barely paid off.

428 was well received by Japanese critics. Famitsu gave it a perfect 40/40 score, making it the ninth game to receive one since the magazine's inception in 1986. It is also the only visual novel to receive a perfect score, and the second of five Wii games to receive it, the others being Super Smash Bros. Brawl, Monster Hunter Tri, New Super Mario Bros. Wii and The Legend of Zelda: Skyward Sword. This is unprecedented in Famitsu history as it marks the first time that two games released on the same video game system received perfect scores within the same year. The game additionally won the publication's Dramatic Prize for its 2008 awards. At the 2008 Japan Game Awards, it received an award in the "Future Division" for its new level of realism comparable to a TV drama. In 2017, Famitsu readers voted 428 the second best adventure game of all time, behind only Steins;Gate.

The game's western release was also well-received; Destructoid called it "the most persuasive argument" for the concept of live-action video games. The Verge called it "the best crime book you'll ever read on your PS4". RPG Site called it one of the year's best games, praising its creative parallel storytelling and stating that it is "one of the most inventive experiences ever" with "nothing else quite like it". GameSpot praised the "Excellent writing and characterization packed with drama, emotion, and humor" as well as the multiple character viewpoints and how player choices can "have far-reaching effects." IGN also praised the "excellent writing and characterization" and how choices lead to unpredictable outcomes, calling it a great visual novel. PlayStation LifeStyle called it "hands-down the best visual novel" with praise for the "character development, a rich, meaningful story, humor, action, romance", the "exceptional" dialogue, and large number of different endings.

Hardcore Gamer said it is "clearly the child of Spike Chunsoft as it pioneered many of the features that fans know and love from the Zero Escape and Danganronpa games" yet has "a totally distinct identity from both those titles." Gameblog said it tells a "riveting" story, makes "clever use of its multiple bad endings system" and "introduces you to a cast of characters" that "grows on you so much" that "once the game ends, you're sad that you'll never see them again." GamesMaster called it a "wild ride from start to finish, with memorable characters and an absorbing plot." RPGFan said its "nonlinear, vignette-based narrative is a perfect fit for the Sound Novel format," praised the script, and said "it's a title that even the staunchest visual novel skeptic can get a lot of enjoyment out of."

== Future ==
According to Nakamura, there were no plans for a sequel to 428 due to the number of copies sold throughout Japan, but has said that he has no problems conceptualizing the last game in the trilogy.

A successor to the game was first announced by game designer Jiro Ishii on April 28, 2025, with a link to a crowdfunding project. On June 28, the funding exceeded the required fund by over 670%, which led to the full development of the project, later named Shibuya Scramble Stories. On July 14, Ishii launched a livestream video event where he announced that a game demo will be released by 2027 while the full game is expected to be out by 2028. Future livestreams had shown parts of the game, such as the return of some past actors from 428: Shibuya Scramble and Machi, the return of composer Hideki Sakamoto with a new main theme, and other staff members from 428 working on the new game.

== See also ==
- Time Travelers, written by Jiro Ishii
