= Banshee's Last Cry =

1994 video game

- Super Famicom cover art
- Developer: Chunsoft
- Publisher: Chunsoft
- Director: Kazuya Asano
- Producer: Koichi Nakamura
- Writer: Takemaru Abiko
- Composers: Kota Kato; Koji Nakajima
- Series: Kamaitachi no Yoru
- Platforms: Super Famicom; PlayStation; Web browser; Game Boy Advance; iOS
- Release: November 25, 1994: Super Famicom; JP: November 25, 1994 PlayStation; JP: December 3, 1998 Game Boy Advance; JP: June 28, 2002 iOS; JP: April 25, 2013; WW: January 24, 2014
- Genre: Visual novel
- Mode: Single-player

Banshee's Last Cry (Note: Japanese: かまいたちの夜, Hepburn: Kamaitachi no Yoru; lit. 'The Night of the Kamaitachi') is a 1994 visual novel video game developed by Chunsoft. The game is set in a snowy mountain area in Nagano, where the player unravels a mystery behind a murder that occurs. The game was developed by Chunsoft as the second game in their Sound Novel series following Otogirisō (1992). These games featured text covering still backgrounds while the player reads the story told through text on the screen. The player can make choices from menu options to progress and change the direction of the story. The story moves in different directions based on some of these choices which will give clues to the player on the identity of the murder culprit.

Following the release of Otogirisō, Chunsoft contacted the Japanese mystery author Takemaru Abiko to write the story for their next novel game. Abiko spent two years developing a story while the music and sound effects in the game were made by Kota Kato and Koji Nakajima. The game differs from the previous game in the Sound Novel series, featuring digitized photos of real-world locations instead of pixel art. It also features silhouettes of people representing the characters in the story. The addition of these silhouettes was a late in development decision which caused the production time on Banshee's Last Cry to be extended.

Banshee's Last Cry sold well for Chunsoft. It spawned a franchise with the sequel Kamaitachi no Yoru 2 (2002), as well as various ports, spin-offs and a remake with Kamaitachi no Yoru: Rinne Saisei. It received its only English adaptations for the iOS in 2014 which localizes some of the characters, names, and locations. The game was an influential visual novel, with similar gameplay featured in titles like Leaf's Shizuku (1996) and ELF Corporation's Yu-no (1996). Its been cited as an influence by other games developers such as Jiro Ishii and Kotaro Uchikoshi. In 2017, the Japanese magazine Famitsu magazine asked its readers to vote for their favorite adventure game, with Banshee's Last Cry being placed in sixth place in the poll.

== Gameplay ==
Banshee's Last Cry is a sound novel, a term academic Rebecca Crawford described as being applied to Chunsoft's 20th century visual novel games. It features a user interface where the games story is told through text superimposed on an image of the entire screen. In the game, the player either progresses through the story by pressing buttons, make choices through menu options to change the direction of the narrative, or is prompted to enter a name based on who the player currently thinks the murderer is. Players also have the option to fast-forward through text they have read or rewind to re-read text that was previously displayed. The story in the game is divided into chapters which can also be re-selected for re-reading after a player had reached an ending. Choosing different options gameplay will have the story unfold differently and potentially lead to different endings. Banshee's Last Cry features multiple scenarios and multiple endings with the narrative changing depending on the users choices. The more endings that are found allow for allows for more choices at branching points in the game.

During the various routes and endings, the player can learn clues to guide them to the identity of the true culprit. There are 21 different endings in the original release of Banshee's Last Cry. After clearing the mystery chapter and seeing all the endings in each route, the save data on the game screen will turn pink. The appearance of a "pink bookmark" unlocks a more over-the-top comedic parody of the mystery story in the game.

== Plot ==
The game follows the characters Toru (Max in the English localization) and his girlfriend Mari (Grace in English), who stay at a ski lodge when a snowstorm takes place. That evening, a paper note is found in another guest's room, stating "Tonight, at midnight, someone will die". When one of the lodge guests is killed shortly thereafter, the characters are drawn into a murder mystery, while being cut off from contact with the outside world.

== Development ==
=== Writing ===
Following the release of Otogirisō (1992), Chunsoft received requests via feedback postcards that the next game should be a mystery. Following the release of Otogirisō, Chunsoft contacted several mystery authors and sent them copies of the game. Among the authors contacted was Takemaru Abiko, who had his first mystery work Hachi no satsujin (Note: ８の殺人; lit. 'Murder Number Eight') published in 1989. Abiko responded saying he was familiar with Chunsoft since their game Door Door (1983). This led to a meeting with a member of the teams staff in July 1993. Producer Koichi Nakamura described Abiko as an real game enthusiast, having played more games than even he had. While he initially thought he was just going to proofread or give advice on the next game, Abiko ended up writing the entire script which took him two years to complete. The plan was to have a long substantial episode, then have two or three substantional fully fleshed out mystery stories and then from there have a variety of stories such as the spy oriented one that involves a snowmobile chase. Abiko also suggested ideas for scenarios that required unique interactions with the Super Famicom, such as a scenario that is accessed by hitting the reset button. Abiko said the scenario that occurs when pressing the reset scenario was influenced by Fredric Brown's short story "Don't Look Behind You". The title of the game was drawn from the Japanese television show Kaiki Dai Sakusen (Note: 怪奇大作戦, Kaiki Dai Sakusen; lit. 'Mystery Mission') which Abiko watched as a child. After seeing an episode titled "Kamaitachi", the author became enamored with the word. The kamaitachi refers to the Japanese mythical creature if the same name. The creature resembles a weasel which uses a sickle to inflict wounds on its victims.

Abiko described writing for a game as different than for a novel, as dialogue has to be completed within a single screen and there are fewer characters to write with than a regular page of a book. This led to some parts having to change rapidly. Abiko worked at the Chunsoft officed during the debugging phases of the game in order to correct inconsistencies in the branching narratives. Abiko also said that there was a challenge to make sure choices were clear to those who could see the truth, but not so clear that the choices themselves were hints to those who did not know the truth.

The director of Banshee's Last Cry was Kazuya Asano. Asano had first worked with Chunsoft during the development of Dragon Quest III (1988) and contributed to the original scenario for Otogirisō. Asano wrote some side-branches in the game when he felt there were not enough choices.

=== Music ===
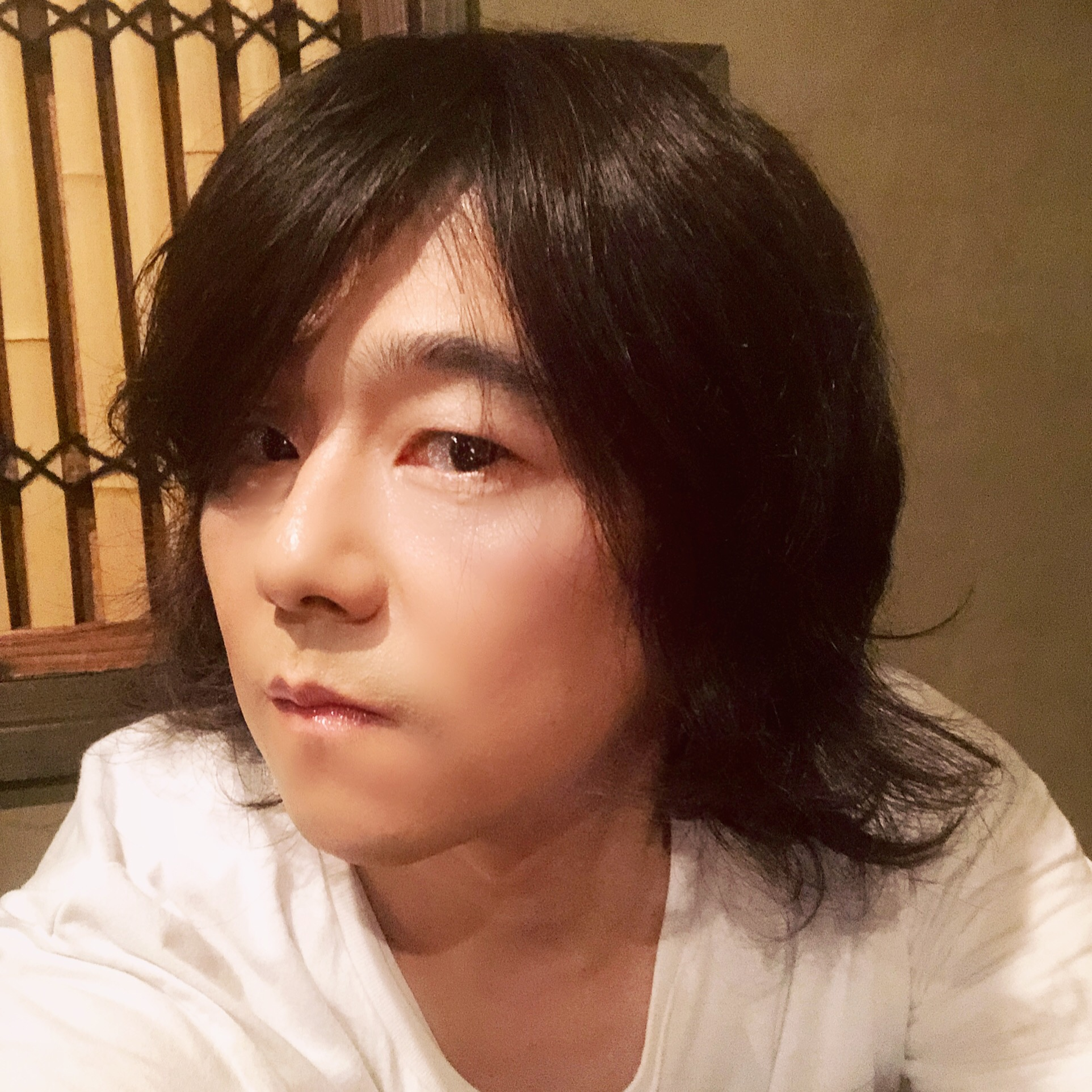
Kota Kato in 2019. Kato was one of the two composers of the Super Famicom version of Banshee's Last Cry.

Unlike most games where the music was is composed after the images are finalized, the music for Banshee's Last Cry was composed at a very early stage of development with no reference images. The backing music is also usually indicated from the games director which would indicated what kind of music is required to match a scene. The sound production for the game was handled by a three-person team. The composers of the music were the sound designers Kota Kato and Koji Nakajima. Chiyoko Mitsumata, the composer of Otogirisō took on the role of the coordinator of music development.

One of the game's composers, Kota Kato said that he was just handed the script for the game and told to read it and create music and sound effects that would fit the scenes. Some instructions were given later, such as Asano asking Kato to create a distinctive theme tune, such as Seiichi Kayama's theme which is ballad done in a Japanese style of music called enka. He was also told that these songs should not have intros, in order to give them a feeling that the world of the game changes as soon as scene changes.

Kato made his debut as a composer with Banshee's Last Cry and it was his second year working for Chunsoft. Kato said that for the music he used both "snow" and "fear" as motifs. For snow, he aimed it to fulfil different roles depending on the scene, where it could symbolize beauty, terror or melancholy. For fear, he avoided music that had a melody as it would sound too much a like a typical thriller style of music. This led to the music be more inline with the theme music from The Terminator (1984). He also cited the synthesizer sounds that Kuniaki Haishima did for the television series Yonimo Kimyōna monogatari (Note: 世にも奇妙な物語, lit. 'Tales of the Unusual') as an influence. Nakajima said that Kato was composing music quickly and making more horror-themed music which led him to make the other tunes which he described as being more jazzy or progressive sounding. He added strings to the music to have it have something comparable to Otogiriso. As the work progressed, Kato and Nakajima gradually began to divide the songwriting responsibilities. Much of Kato's music was used in the more frightening scenes. Asano was given the songs by Nakamura and used them freely, which led Nakajima saying some songs were used in way that were not initially intended.

The three members of Chunsoft's sound team sampled and digitized sound effects created by an external company. These were refined into sounds that were usable in the game. Due to the size limitations of the Super Famicom cartridge they had difficulty making more irregular sounds be realistic such as the sound of a blizzard. Some sounds, such as the male screams heard in the game were voiced by the original game staff and recorded in a conference room.

=== Programming and graphics ===
Gameplay of a menu selection in the original Super Famicom version of Banshee's Last Cry. The addition of the silhouetted characters was a late in development decision which caused the release of the game to be delayed.

In Otogirisō (1992), the first game in the sound novel series, graphics were made from pixel art illustrations for its backgrounds. This method was originally going to be used again for Banshee's Last Cry until Nakamura decided to incorporate actual images of real life locations in the game. To find locations in the game, members of Chunsoft went to a few guesthouses and did not find one that suited the game. The team consulted a travel agency which introduced them Knulp which was ultimately chosen. The owners agreed to have their location featured as long as they did not move or break too many items.

Originally, Banshee's Last Cry was just going to have still images as backgrounds. Asano said as the number of characters was significantly more than that in Otogirisō they decided to include human figures as well. Abiko suggested that the characters be displayed as silhouettes. The idea was to display them all as suspects like how culprits are depicted in Case Closed. While Abiko thought this would make characters impossible to tell apart visually, he was surprised to find the finished product featured silhouettes that were designed uniquely to have each character stand out. Nakamura said the game turned out better with the silhouettes, but adding them extended the development schedule. Bloodstains were made from live-action footage with special effects make-up. Asano explained that as there was no regulations such as the Computer Entertainment Rating Organization (CERO) at the time, the team could make whatever they wanted.

Asano said to enhance the scary elements while saving money, he had the programmers create a command that would subtly and gradually darken the screen. This idea was inspired by music that plays in dungeons in the Dragon Quest games, where the pitch of the music would decrease as the player descended deeper into the dungeon. The climax of the game features a part where the player must enter the name of the culprit rather than choosing from a fixed amount of potential culprits. Asano said this was important as to have this option as it let players input various options, such as the name of the cat in the guesthouse. Abiko also felt this was important, as he wanted to make it so that the game couldn't be solved by brute force alone, and wanted the player to do something other than just choose an option. Some of the staff who worked on the programming for Banshee's Last Cry were part of a subsidiary company for Chunsoft called Aquamarine that was located just down the road from Chunsoft's office at the time. The game was announced as being completed by June 1994.

== Release and reception ==
Banshee's Last Cry was shown at the Famicom Space World trade show in Tokyo held from August 24 to the 26 in 1993. At the event, there was no set release date for the game yet. The Super Famicom release of the game was later scheduled for mid-1994. It was released in Japan for the Super Famicom in Japan on November 24, 1994 as Kamaitachi no Yoru. Aside from the occasional erotic game, there were no Japanese visual novels released for English-language audiences the 1990s and early 2000s. Banshee's Last Cry would not be released in English until 2014 for iOS-based devices.

Banshee's Last Cry had various follow-ups from 2002 to 2011 as well as ports and remakes for other video game consoles and both feature phones and smartphones. In the various ports of the game, some of the dialogue is changed to keep references contemporary. For example, references to popular television shows are changed to be more reflective of the eras they ports were released in.

=== Super Famicom ===
Nakamura began speculating that the game would be a hit as the game slowly began rising in the charts for "anticipated games" in the Japanese magazine Famitsu. On Famitsu's weekly best seller chart for November 21 to November 27, Banshee's Last Cry was the second highest selling game, only being beaten by Donkey Kong Country (1994). The Super Famicom version of the game was a huge hit in Japan, selling 750,000 copies. This version of the game has been available in Japan through various formats, such as the Nintendo Power Flash memory cartridge service which ran from 1997 to 2007. It was re-released for Wii and Wii U's Virtual Console on March 13, 2007 and August 7, 2013 respectively. An unofficial English-language patch for the Super Famicom version of the game was released in 2026.

Reception

Review score
Publication	Score
Famitsu	9/10, 8/10, 8/10, 5/10

Four writers for the Japanese magazine Famitsu reviewed the game on its release. One reviewer said the game was comparable to the next generation of console games in terms of quality and made all the games similar to Otogirisō (1992) look like pale imitations. While one Famitsu reviewer cautioned that the game may be trying for audiences who lack the patience for it, another said the story sparked their imagination and that the game warranted return playthroughs. While one Famitsu reviewer praised Abiko's scenario, Tatsuhiko Shiino of Game Criticism wrote that Banshee's Last Cry was not satisfactory. Shiino said that there have been no improvements in the gameplay, while still finding it an improvement in terms of narrative quality over Otogirisō. One Famitsu reviewer found Chunsoft's sound novels generally a poor substitute for literature, while finding the image quality to be good, they found they preferred the images put in their own head when reading an actual novel.

In a retrospective review from Denfaminico Gamer said while getting to the point of identifying the killer is a struggle, it ultimately was a truly scary mystery game. In a retrospective of the game from Famitsu, the writer Kawachi recalled how surprised they were to how scary the game still was and applauded the variety of endings. They ultimately recommended newcomers to the game to play the PlayStation version which had added features for more ease-of-use.

=== Sound Novel Evolution version ===
On 23 July 1998, Chunsoft announced that along with the games Otogirisō (1992) and Machi (1998), Banshee's Last Cry would be remade as part of the Sound Novel Evolution (Note: サウンドノベル・エボリューション, Saundonoberu eboryūshon; lit. Sound Novel Evolution) series. This version of the game included new scenarios and allowed players to check on their paths using a flowchart feature and has new graphics, new scenarios added, and an intro video to the game.

The additional scenario was only written after the PlayStation version of the game was announced. Suggestions for new scenarios such as the culprit changing or the game being seen from Mari's point of view were deemed too difficult to implement into the script at this point, which led to the new scenario being an independent story where characters open a detective agency.

The development team initially debated initially including a flowchart option in this version of the game. When discussing the original version with owners of the game, Koichi Nakamura said that many players did not solve the case as intended and some players who borrowed the game only played it a little, were killed by Mari, and just presumed she was the culprit. Nakamura said that the flowchart system was added ultimately to make it easier for players who could not solve the case in the Super Famicom version of the game. Nakamura said that the Kamaitachi no Yoru sold over 400,000 copies which made it the best-selling of the PlayStation Sound Novel Evolution series as Otogirisō and Machi releases sold only around 100,000 units.

Reception

Review scores
Publication	Score
Famitsu	8/10, 8/10, 7/10, 7/10
Dengeki PlayStation	80/100, 80/100
The PlayStation	78/100, 64/100, 92/100

Reviewers in Famitsu, Dengeki PlayStation, and The PlayStation magazines all complimented the addition of the flow-chart to the game. While they added that it made traversing through the story much better, one reviewer in Famitsu questioned it would make the game too easy. One reviewer each in Dengeki PlayStation and Famitsu complimented the addition of vibrations from the DualShock controllers being added at key moments in the story. One reviewer in Famitsu lamented any further quality of life features such as the ability to skip through text that has been previously read.

A reviewer in The PlayStation found the story still remained interesting, while reviewers in Famitsu found themselves still engaged with the story even after playing the Super Famicom version. While on reviewer in Famitsu complimented how the new scenarios were subtly woven into the story, another lamented that the new stories were too short. One reviewer praised new graphics as being higher quality than the earlier version of the game, appearing almost like live-action footage, another reviewer in Dengeki PlayStation lamented that the loading times in the game were longer on the PlayStation.

=== Kamaitachi no Yoru Advance ===
To coincide with the release of the sequel Kamaitachi no Yoru 2 (2002), Chunsoft created cross-media marketing strategy in 2002 which involved ports of Banshee's Last Cry to the Game Boy Advance and through browsers as a flash game. This also included various books and compact discs related to the game, and a film adaptation.

Jiro Ishii was the director for the port of Banshee's Last Cry for the Game Boy Advance. When developing this version, Ishii was particularly impressed with how the original game was made and how it handled its flag system. This version was published by Chunsoft in Japan as Kamaitachi no Yoru Advance (Note: かまいたちの夜 Advance) on June 28, 2002. This version of the game included a visual presentation of the branching paths in the game.

Reception

Review score
Publication	Score
Famitsu	7/10, 8/10, 8/10, 8/10

In a contemporary review, two reviewers in Famitsu said while it was an older game, it did not have any drawbacks due to its age. Another reviewer found playing it on a handheld enhanced the novel-aspect of the game. Kentaro Honji of 4gamer.net reflected on the game in 2021 saying it had unexpectedly readable text and clear that that was comparable in quality to the Super Famicom and PlayStation versions, ultimately saying it was the best version of the game.

=== Browser and phone releases ===
In the early days of mobile phone games, companies provided content such as wallpapers and game services for a fixed monthly fee. Versions of Banshee's Last Cry were released in this format for various mobile services in Japan, such as J-Sky on April 1, 2002, i-αppli on February 20, 2004, and VAppli and EZweb on July 3 and July 13, 2006 respectively. These types of subscriptions fell out of popularity with the advent of smartphones.

A version of the game was made for web browsers in Macromedia Flash titled Kamaitachi no Yoru Internet (Note: かまいたちの夜internet) was published on July 1, 2002. It also featured a subscription service feature that let users play the game online for a six-month period. Service for Kamaitachi no Yoru Internet ended on September 30, 2005.

Reception

Review score
Publication	Score
TouchArcade	3/5

A version of the game was released for the Apple iOS. It was re-titled Banshee's Last Cry and was developed by Spike Chunsoft and published by Aksys Games for English-language markets. It was released in Japan on April 25, 2013 and in English on January 24, 2014. The English version was localized by Jeremy Blaustein and localizes some of the characters, names, and locations. The setting is moved from Nagano to British Columbia, the protagonists are now college-aged kids named Max and Grace and a brash Osaka-based businessman is now a Texan.

Todd Ciolek of the Anime News Network said that the game was unlikely to satisfy audiences expecting to be swept away like many Japanese players, but found this version of the game to be an "interesting sample of a craft that's seen too seldom on these shores." Shaun Musgrave of TouchArcade praised the sound design and replay value of the game, but ultimately found it dated in comparison to similar contemporary games for smartphones such as Sorcery! (2013).

=== Kamaitachi no Yoru: Rinne Saisei ===
Reception

Review score
Publication	Score
Famitsu	8/10, 8/10, 8/10, 8/10

A remake was titled Kamaitachi no Yoru: Rinne Saisei was released on February 16, 2017 for the PlayStation Vita and then ported to Windows on February 23, 2018. This version of the game was developed 5pb and added voice acting, new anime-styled artwork by Alpha and a new additional scenario written by Ryukishi07. Following the announcement of the game and its visual changes of the characters from silhouette to illustrated designs, an online response from fans of the series were against the new design of the characters. The PlayStation Vita release of the game sold 6,140 copies in its first week of release.

Reviewers in Famitsu said this version of the game was aimed at a new audience to the series and found that the illustrated characters helped decipher who was who, but potentially lessened the atmosphere and could potentially leave less room for the imagination for players. On the response to this version of this game, Chiyomaru Shikura of Mages and Bpb said that while that audiences who actually purchased this version enjoyed it.

== Aftermath and influence ==
=== Sequels and spin-offs ===
Initially, Abiko said he had no plans for any further novel games and was thinking about a new form of game that could only work on home computers. He would return to work with Chunsoft on various sequels.

Following the lower than expected sales of Chunsoft's Machi (1998), the company decided to create a sequel to Kamaitachi no Yoru. Koichiro Ito directed and supervised the scenario for the games sequel, Kamaitachi no Yoru 2 (2002). This game was written by Keiichi Tanaka and Osamu Makino with only the some stories and jokes being written by Abiko. The second game has the characters Toru and Mari visit a remote island where the where they get involved in another incident. The events in Banshee's Last Cry are presented as a story within a story in the sequel. A third game, Kamaitachi no Yoru ×3 was released in 2006. The third game was the final game to feature the characters from the first game, with Shin Kamaitachi no Yoru (2011) featuring a rebooted story and new characters. Abiko and Asano returned to write the game among several other writers. It features a similar main scenario to Banshee's Last Cry of people visiting a guest house where one is killed.

Kamaitachi no Yoru: Niwango Version was released by Niwango as a game through their e-mail service in 2006. The story of the game was a completely original one, based on Kamaitachi no Yoru. It is written by Kotaro Uchikoshi and supervised by the original author, Abiko. Uchikoshi wrote the new version of the game as a freelancer before joining Chunsoft and while working on the development of 12Riven: The Psi-Climinal of Integral (2006). In the Niwango Version, the main character is a woman is stuck on a snowy mountain in a cabin. In the game she sends e-mails to the player saying she can't escape with prompts for the player on what she should do next. As the e-mail service has ended, Kamaitachi no Yoru: Niwango Version is no longer playable.

=== Adaptations ===
As part of the 2002 cross-promotion for Kamaitachi no Yoru 2, a television film influenced by the game titled Kamaitachi no Yoru aired on TBS Television in Japan in 2002. The film is about Takahiko, played by Tatsuya Fujiwara, an office worker who regularly visits a popular fan site for the video game Kamaitachi no Yoru. He arranges an offline meeting with fans of the game, but on going to a guesthouse they only find a van with takes them to the house where the murders took place in the game.

In 2024, a stage production of Kamaitachi no Yoru: The Live (Note: かまいたちの夜 〜THE LIVE〜) based on the game was produced. It is an original story based on the game and was performed in Tokyo and Osaka. The play features a gimmick where the story branches into different narratives based on the audience choice.

Following the 30th anniversary of the original game, a number of cross-media promotions were made for the series such as online content related to the manga series Spy × Family in 2024 and new content related to the Banshee's Last Cry being made available for Capcom's Street Fighter 6 (2023) in October 2025. On hearing about the collaboration with Capcom's game, Abiko said he did not really understand it and presumed it would be made for Street Fighter's audience for a quick laugh but ultimately found it well made after seeing it.

=== Influence ===
In the book History of the Japanese Video Game Industry (2023), Yuhsuke Koyama wrote that both Otogirisō and Banshee's Last Cry were the two video games from the 1990s had a direct influence on contemporary novel-styled games. This included their format of placing text over illustrated backgrounds rather than confining it to a box dedicated for dialogue. Academic Ko On Chan said that this style used in both games allowed for more text on screen which intensified the experience of reading through sound effects and illustrations. This style subsequently became the genesis for similar games, such as Leaf's Shizuku (1996) and Kizuato (1996).

Banshee's Last Cry also introduced the flow-chart styled narrative structure, which became a trend in Japanese adventure games from the late 1990s to the early 2000s where the player tries to interpret what fully happened in story from the various paths the story can take. One example of an early game that borrows this structure and the looping narrative format was Yu-no (1996) which involved a player repeatedly experiencing bad endings while searching for the real culprit.

Other developers have cited Banshee's Last Cry as an influence in their own games, including Jiro Ishii who would later work on games like 428: Shibuya Scramble (2008) and Time Travelers (2012). He said that around the mid-1990s after playing both Otogirisō and Banshee's Last Cry, he began focusing on his career in video games. Kotaro Uchikoshi said that his first serious experience with adventure games was with sound novels, specifically with Banshee's Last Cry, which became one of his favorite adventure games. He added that in his games, he often places his characters in a state of discomfort such as being trapped in a place with no escape, which is also done in the setting of Banshee's Last Cry. Ryukishi07, author of Higurashi When They Cry (2002) said while there were many novel games featuring cute girls, for his first series he was influenced by films like The Blair Witch Project (1999) as well as the murder mystery themes of both Otogirisō and Banshee's Last Cry.

In 2017, Famitsu magazine in Japan asked its readers to vote for their favorite adventure game. Kamaitachi no Yoru placed in sixth place in the poll. Asano reflected on the original game in 2024 saying he considered it his breakthrough work and while he had worked as a staff member on various Dragon Quest games, he said he always mentions Banshee's Last Cry when asked about what kind of games he makes. Abiko looked back on the series in 2025, and said that unlike other series, Banshee's Last Cry felt like an older game being continuously re-released on new platforms and never felt it truly evolved.
