= Kamaitachi no Yoru 2 =

- Developer: Chunsoft
- Publishers: Chunsoft (PS2); Sega (PSP)
- Director: Shinya Ochiai
- Producer: Hiroto Tamura
- Composer: Hideki Togi
- Series: Kamaitachi no Yoru
- Platforms: PlayStation 2, feature phone, PlayStation Portable
- Release: PlayStation 2: JP: July 18, 2002; Feature phones: JP: December 16, 2004; PlayStation Portable: JP: May 25, 2006
- Genre: Visual novel

Kamaitachi no Yoru 2: Kangokujima no Warabeuta (Note: Japanese: かまいたちの夜2 ～監獄島のわらべ唄～, Hepburn: Kamaitachi no Yoru Tsū Kangokujima no Warabeuta; lit. The Night of the Kamaitachi 2: Nursery Rhymes of Prison Island) is a 2002 visual novel video game for the PlayStation 2. The game is a sequel to Kamaitachi no Yoru (1994), which was released as Banshee's Last Cry on its English release. As a visual novel, the game predominantly features a user interface where the game's story is told through text superimposed over an image that covers the entire gameplay screen.

In Kamaitachi no Yoru 2, it is revealed that the events of the first game was a story within a story, and that the first story was a video game itself. The second story involves the actors who were the silhouette models in the first game who are invited by the author of the first game to a remote island where they find themselves trapped. From there, various stories can occur with a total of 105 different endings.

As both the Super Famicom and PlayStation versions of Kamaitachi no Yoru were high sellers for Chunsoft, the company opted to create a sequel following the poor sales of their previous novel game Machi (1998). The game was released to high ratings from various Japanese video game magazines such as Famitsu and Dengeki PlayStation who complimented on the games storyline and graphics and being the highest quality yet seen in the genre. Koichi Nakamura of Chunsoft spoke later about the audience's reception to the game, saying that they found the game had too many horror elements, the mystery was too easy to solve, and that players did not respond well to the twist involving the first game.

== Gameplay ==
Kamaitachi no Yoru 2 is a sound novel video game, a term academic Rebecca Crawford described as being applied to Chunsoft's early visual novel games. It features a user interface where the games story is told through text superimposed on an image of the entire screen.

In Kamaitachi no Yoru 2, the player can have various endings, with some being achievable within 5 minutes of gameplay. There are 105 different endings in the game. After completing the main storyline, the ability to enter other storylines becomes available.

== Plot ==
In the Kamaitachi no Yoru 2, the first game is revealed to be a video game. The people who served as models for the silhouetted characters in the Kamaitachi no Yoru are invited by the author of the original game, Takemaru Abiko, to Mikazuki Island. A huge storm occurs, which makes the guests unable to leave the island.

From this premise, the game splits into various themed stories ranging from horror, murder mystery to erotica. Some stories change the perspective of other characters such as Mari.

== Development ==
Chunsoft had previously released games similar to Kamitachi No Yoru 2, with Otogirisō (1992) on the Super Famicom, Machi (1998) for the Sega Saturn and Kamaitachi no Yoru (1994), released as Banshee's Last Cry in English-speaking territories, which was the best seller among the three.

Koichi Nakamura of Chunsoft said that for Kamaitachi no Yoru 2, there was a lot of discussion on how to make it a proper sequel. Ideas ranged from setting it in a snowy mountain region again, but ultimately it was set with the same characters, with a series of murders set in a locked room. To do this, the story of the first game is presented as a story within a story in Kamaitachi no Yoru 2. This plot element provoked discussion among the audience of the series. Nakamura later described it as their biggest mistake with Kamaitachi no Yoru 2, and said that he never expected it to cause such a response from the fans.

The producer of Kamaitachi no Yoru 2, Hiroto Tamura, said that Nakamura told him to make the game to be up to standards of the current graphics standard of the PlayStation 2 and to make them as stylish as the film The Matrix (1999) which caused him a lot of trouble. These requests led to enlisting external filmmakers, musicians and writers to create the game.

Keiichi Tanaka and Osamu Makino wrote the main stories in Kamaitachi no Yoru 2. The original writer of Kamitachi No Yoru, Takemaru Abiko, contributed to the "Pink Bookmark" segments and some of the more humorous portions. Nakamura said that the "Pink Bookmark" segment was described as being "too much" and caused debate on how far they should go with it at the Chunsoft offices at the time. Abiko said that he was exhausted of ideas for a new Kamaitachi no Yoru and suggested to have authors with a different style than his own write the sequel.

=== Release ===
Kamaitachi no Yoru 2 was published by Chunsoft in Japan for the PlayStation 2 on July 18, 2002. By August 29, IGN said that it had sold 305,536 copies. To coincide with the release of Kamaitachi no Yoru 2 Chunsoft created cross-media marketing strategy which involved ports of Kamaitachi no Yoru to the Game Boy Advance and through web browsers as a flash game. This also included various books and compact discs related to the game, and a film adaptation.

In the early days of mobile phone games, companies provided content such as wallpapers and game services for a fixed monthly fee. A version of the game was ported to various Japanese feature phone services such as EZweb, i-mode, and Ymobile on December 16, 2004. The game was ported to the PlayStation Portable on May 25, 2006. This version of Kamaitachi no Yoru 2 was published by Sega.

The original PlayStation 2 game became available on the PlayStation Store on March 27, 2012.

== Reception ==
Reception

Review scores
Publication	Score
Dengeki PlayStation	95/100, 85/100
Famitsu	9/10, 9/10, 9/10, 9/10
Famitsu PS2	9/10, 8/10, 9/10, 9/10
Hyper PlayStation 2	9/10, 10/10
The PS2	10/10, 10/10, 10/10

For the original PlayStation 2 release, the game received high scores from various Japanese video game magazines such as Dengeki PlayStation, Hyper PlayStation 2, The PS2, the Weekly Famitsu and Famitsu PS2 which was a magazine dedicated to the specific console.

Reviewers commented on the graphics and storyline in the game. Nan Demo Yuko of Dengeki PlayStation found the backgrounds and characters to be incredibly realistic, which would help draw players into the story. Tomato Sugihara of Famitsu said the graphics were superior to any other game in the genre. Takuro Hirayama said that while there had been comments about releasing a game for the PlayStation 2 in a genre that is predominantly text and background visuals, he urged audiences to play the game as its high quality story, diverse scenarios and high quality graphics and sound would dispel any doubts. Kiyoshi Kawata of Famitsu PS2 added that there were no significant enhancements of this game appearing on the PlayStation 2, which was to be expected of a sound novel game, but that its production quality shows that everything was meticulously crafted and its storyline is head and shoulders above similar games.

== Legacy ==
Kazunori Yamaguchi of 4gamer.net said that the game had both its fans and detractors amongst its audience. Comments ranged from the game being too gory, creepy, having bad visuals, and that it was not similar enough to the first game. Koichi Nakamura said in 2006 that when the original game was released, the response was that the game's mystery was too easy to solve and that there was too much focus on the horror elements. He followed up that the third game, Kamaitachi no Yoru ×3 would have a mystery that was not so easily solvable. The negative response from audience for Kamaitachi no Yoru 2 led to the producer Hiroto Tamura leaving Chunsoft. Abiko said that in terms of sales, it didn't reach the level of the original game and that Kamaitachi no Yoru 2's entire staff was devastated in response to its commercial failure.

Game developer Jiro Ishii said that Chunsoft had problems on the release of the game as the mystery was solved on the day of the release and posted to 2channel. This led to Chunsoft making the later novel game 428: Shibuya Scramble (2008) more complex to solve.
