= Bungo and Alchemist =

2016 Japanese role-playing game

- Developer: EXNOA
- Publisher: DMM Games
- Director: Kōhei Taniguchi
- Writer: Jiro Ishii
- Composer: Hideki Sakamoto
- Platforms: PC (HTML5), iOS, Android
- Release: JP: November 1, 2016
- Genre: Online web browser game

Bungo and Alchemist (文豪とアルケミスト, Bungō to Alchemist; lit. Writers and Alchemist), also known as BunAl (文アル, Bunaru), is a free-to-play collectible card browser video game launched in Japan on November 1, 2016, with a mobile port of the game releasing on June 14, 2017. The game is developed by EXNOA and published by DMM.com.

== Gameplay ==
The player is tasked as a Special Duty Librarian (特務司書), otherwise known as The Alchemist (アルケミスト), and is tasked to delve into tainted books and purify them with parties composed of writers (文豪; lit. "Literary Great") to fight Taints who have corroded the books. To obtain these writers, the player must also delve into ensouled books in order to transmigrate and recruit them into their library.

The writers in the game are depicted as bishōnen. The designs for each character were partially inspired by their real-life counterparts, with each of them holding a book with the covers designed to be similar to a book they had written in real life, though the design of their hairstyles are entirely made up by the designers of the game.

== Development ==
The idea for the game was proposed by Kōhei Taniguchi as a game where players would collect fictional characters from works of Japanese literature but, after talking with Jiro Ishii the two decided to make the game about the authors instead. Taniguchi was responsible for the game's concept planning while Ishii was responsible for the world-building. The two of them originally felt a little off about having writers fight using weapons but, after coming up with the idea of the writers delving into tainted books and making the setting somewhat fantasy-like, Ishii and Taniguchi liked the idea enough to implement it. The idea for obtaining the writers through transmigration came after, Ishii came up with the idea of obtaining writers by dragging them out of the books after the two settled on setting the game in a library.

Early on, they also decided to add writers which have strong connections with other writers who are already in game as both creators wanted to show the relationships of their real-life counterparts. Taniguchi also expressing that he would like to explore how some of the writers would interact with one another by mirroring how they felt about one another in real-life.

== Characters ==
Characters featured in the game are based on real-life writers mainly from Japan along with a few writers from the western hemisphere. The weapons the writers use in-game are usually representative of their main body of literary work.

Blades – Representing writers who mainly had written novels and short stories.

Bows – Representing writers who mainly had written Naturalist literature.

Whips – Representing writers who had written popular literature.

Guns – Representing poets and writers of children's literature.

== Anime adaptation ==
- Bungo and Alchemist: Gears of Judgement

文豪とアルケミスト 〜審判ノ歯車〜 (Bungō to Alchemist ~Shinpan no Haguruma~)
- Anime television series
- Directed by: Toshinori Watabe
- Written by: Jun Kumagai
- Music by: Hideki Sakamoto
- Studio: OLM Team Kojima
- Licensed by: Crunchyroll
- Original network: TV Tokyo, TVA, TV Osaka, AT-X
- Original run: April 3, 2020 – August 7, 2020
- Episodes: 13

In 2020, the series received an anime television series adaptation by OLM titled Bungo and Alchemist: Gears of Judgement (文豪とアルケミスト 〜審判ノ歯車〜, Bungō to Alchemist ~Shinpan no Haguruma~). The series ran for 13 episodes from April 3 to August 7, 2020. It was licensed in North America by Funimation. Following Sony's acquisition of Crunchyroll, the series was moved to Crunchyroll.
