= Shin Kamaitachi no Yoru =

- Developer: Chunsoft
- Publisher: Chunsoft
- Series: Kamaitachi no Yoru
- Platforms: PlayStation 3; PlayStation Vita
- Release: JP: December 17, 2011
- Genre: Visual novel
- Modes: Single-player, multiplayer

Shin Kamaitachi no Yoru: 11 Ninme no Hōmonsha (Note: 真かまいたちの夜 11人目の訪問者; lit. 'True Night of the Kamaitachi: The 11th Visitor') is a 2011 visual novel video game. It was a reboot of the Kamaitachi no Yoru series of games that began with Banshee's Last Cry in 1994. It retains the characters trapped in an isolated area where murders suddenly occur, but features completely new characters unrelated to the previous three console games. The game is set in Tōno, Iwate where he explores a guesthouse when recently dead bodies begin to turn up.

As a visual novel, gameplay is predominantly about reading the text on the screen to follow the story occasionally and making decisions that could affect how the story turns out. The player's choice will determine how many characters will remain alive at the end of the story. The game was developed for the PlayStation Vita and was one of the launch titles for the handheld console. The handheld console has unique features such as gyro controls and a unique two-player option. The game was released simultaneously with a version for the PlayStation 3.

The game received favourable reviews in Famitsu magazine and from the website 4gamer.net.

== Gameplay ==
Shin Kamaitachi no Yoru is a sound novel and predominantly retains the "reading" aspect of sound novel gameplay. Mark Kretzschmar and Sara Raffel, authors of The History and Allure of Interactive Visual Novels, described the sound novel as being used primarily to define Japanese games that rely on graphics and sounds instead of puzzles to tell a story and as more generally interchangeable with visual novels. In these games, the player presses buttons to read through text and advance the story by choosing from occasional options. This game has a branching storyline, where the events change depending on which choices are made from the options presented in conversations. These choices can lead to mass murder or to ending the game with the fewest casualties. These "bad endings" contain glimpses of scenes that offer clues to the mystery, and experiencing several of them allows players to further understand parts of the mystery.

Shin Kamaitachi no Yoru includes the options to re-read or jump to different parts of the narrative in the story, ranging from going page by page to using a flowchart to jump multiple sections of the story's many narratives.

The game features extra modes, such as Minna de Kamaitachi an online multiplayer mode that allows up to 100 people to play simultaneously. The second mode is "Futari de Kamaitachi" which is only on the PlayStation Vita version of the game that test your compatibility with your playing partner.

== Plot ==
The story is set in the Brownie guesthouse in Tōno, Iwate. The player takes on the role of the aspiring writer Sakamaki Kaito, an aspiring writer. He explores the guesthouse with Tachibana Kyoka.

== Development ==
Kamaitachi no Yoru was a game series that debuted in 1994 with the game that was later released with the English title Banshee's Last Cry. The series continued and concluded its storyline with Kamaitachi no Yoru ×3 (2011). In the preliminary stages of development of Shin Kamaitachi no Yoru, writer Kenji Kuroda submitted several scenarios to Chunsoft. Kuroda had previously contributed writing to other Chunsoft works such as Trick×Logic (2010) and a novelization of the game 999: Nine Hours, Nine Persons, Nine Doors (2009). One of the submissions Kuroda offered was similar to the Kamaitachi no Yoru games, which led to a full-scale development of a new game in the series.

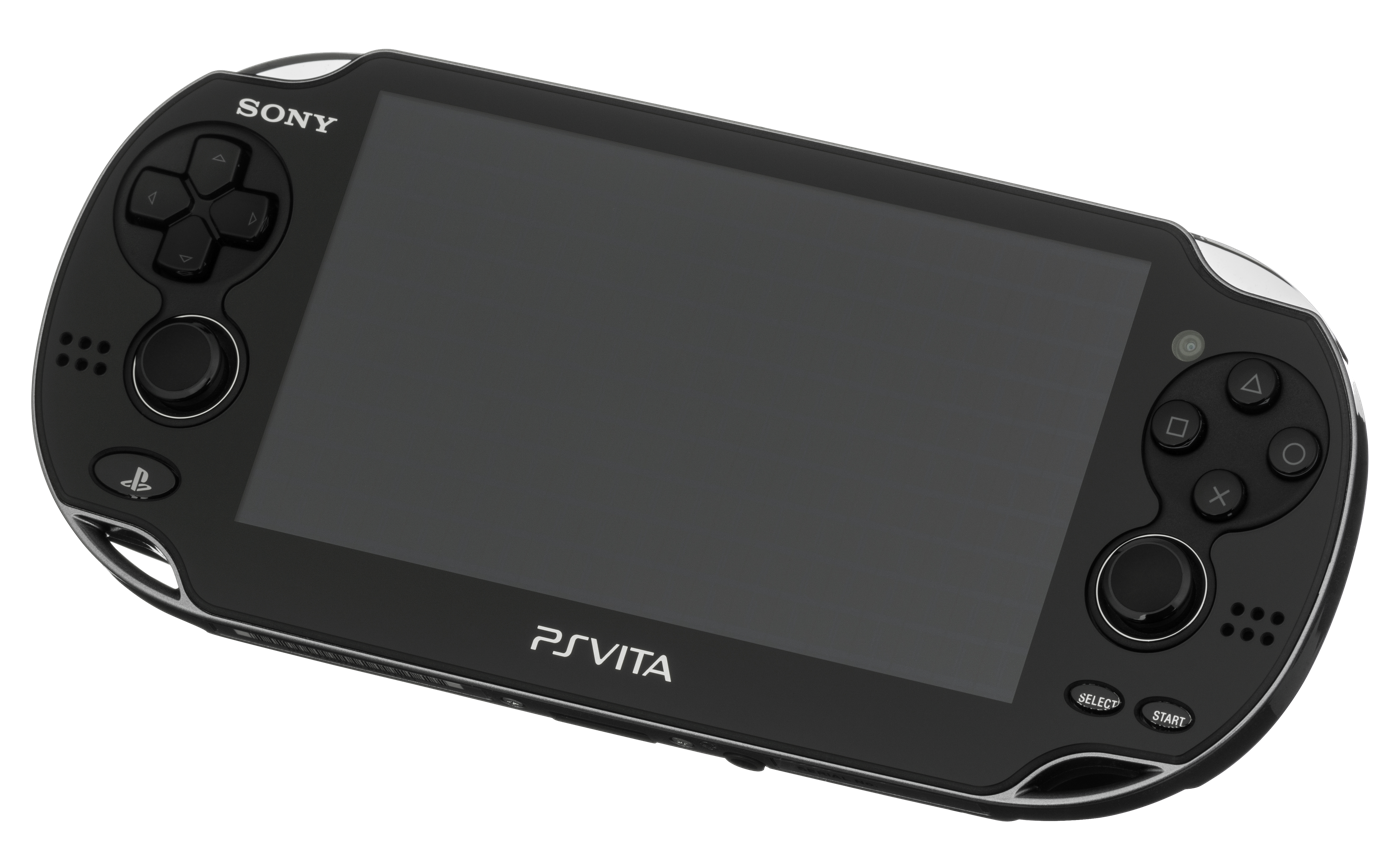
Shin Kamaitachi no Yoru was one of the launch titles for the PlayStation Vita in Japan in 2011.

After meetings at Chunsoft, it was decided to make the game first for the then-upcoming PlayStation Vita and then the PlayStation 3 (PS3). The PlayStation Vita has unique elements developed for it, such as the ability to use the system's motion sensors and touchscreen. The PlayStation Vita version allows the player to explore areas of a room. The PS3 version has this feature, where it is controlled by the analog stick.

Including Kuroda, the game has seven writers. These include creators who worked in the first Kamaitachi no Yoru (1994) such as Kazuya Asano, who directed and wrote some of the stories in the first Kamaitchi no Yoru and Takemaru Abiko, a mystery writer who wrote the first game and has subsequently worked on the story for each of the sequels. The other authors were established authors such as Yasumi Kobayashi, Tetsuya Tanaka, Korumo Migiwa and Yoshihiro Yamaguchi. The game ignores the events of the previous three games and starts fresh with new characters. The game also predominantly has new music outside of "Hitotsu no Suiri" (One Deduction)" which has been used throughout the series. The game also features partial voice acting during pivotal scenes. It was the first of the Kamaitachi no Yoru games to feature voice acting.

== Release ==
Shin Kamaitachi no Yoru was showcased at the 2011 Tokyo Game Show. It was published in Japan by Chunsoft for the PlayStation 3 and the PlayStation Vita on December 17, 2011. The game was a launch title for PlayStation Vita in Japan. The game received downloadable content (DLC) which allowed for additional side stories for the game, starting on December 22, 2011.

The game was re-released by Spike Chunsoft on April 25, 2013. The "Minna de Kamaitachi" online server was discontinued on January 20, 2014.

== Reception ==
Reception

Review score
Publication	Score	
Publication	PS Vita	PS3
Famitsu	9/10, 9/10, 9/10, 8/10	9/10, 9/10, 10/10, 9/10

From contemporary reviews, reviewers of both PlayStation Vita and PlayStation 3 versions of the game in Famitsu complimented the plot and the variety of the scenarios. One reviewer said that while there are not many surprises in the plot, it still unfolds satisfyingly. Another said that as the set-up is somewhat familiar to the first game, it lacks freshness, but would hit the right notes for fans of the series. A reviewer for 4gamer.net similarly said that it was a high-quality sound novel and recommended it for any fan of the genre.

For the other gameplay mechanics, one reviewer in Famitsu said the added exploration moments suggest the sound novel format might be a bit diminished. While one reviewer said the online and multiplayer options were novel, one said they had concerns with it but ultimately found it commendable.
