= Kamaitachi no Yoru ×3 =

- Developer: Chunsoft
- Publisher: Sega (Note: The 2024 release of the game is published by Spike Chunsoft)
- Producer: Koichi Nakamura
- Writer: Takemaru Abiko
- Series: Kamaitachi no Yoru
- Platforms: PlayStation 2, feature phone, Nintendo Switch, PlayStation 4, Windows
- Release: PlayStation 2: JP: July 27, 2006; Feature phones: JP: February 14, 2007; Nintendo Switch, PlayStation 4, Windows: JP: September 19, 2024
- Genre: Visual novel

Kamaitachi no Yoru ×3: San Nichi Tsukishima Jiken no Shinsō (Note: Japanese: かまいたちの夜×3 三日月島事件の真相; lit. 'The Night of the Kamaitachi ×3: The Truth Behind the Mikazuki Island Incident.' The "x3" is pronounced as Triple.) is a 2006 visual novel video game by Chunsoft. It is a third game in the Kamaitachi no Yoru series that started with Kamaitachi no Yoru (1994). One year after the events of Kamaitachi no Yoru 2 (2002) the characters return to the island where the second game took place to mourn the death of their friends a year earlier. As they arrive, they find themselves locked in the mansion on the island where murders again begin to occur.

Kamaitachi no Yoru ×3 features new gameplay in addition to the standard gameplay of reading text and making menu choices to direct the narrative of the story and to solve the mystery. Players can now move between different characters' perspectives during the story to see the characters' points of view. The game was written by Takemaru Abiko, who rewrote a draft of Shinya Ochiai's script that he was writing that was in response to poor sales of Kamaitachi no Yoru 2. It was the last game to continue the story established in the first game, with the next game in the series, Shin Kamaitachi no Yoru having completely new characters and scenario.

The game was released in Japan for the PlayStation 2 on July 27, 2006. The game was re-released with updated graphics in 2024 for the Nintendo Switch, PlayStation 4, and through Steam. In its first week of release, the Nintendo Switch version was the top-selling console game of the week in Japan. This release received positive comments from Famitsu and 4gamer.net who complimented the ability to swap between characters and the updated graphics respectively.

== Gameplay ==
A writer for the Japanese video game magazine Famitsu described Kamaitachi no Yoru ×3 as a sound novel. Mark Kretzschmar and Sara Raffel, authors of The History and Allure of Interactive Visual Novels, described the sound novel as being used primarily to define Japanese games that rely on graphics and sounds instead of puzzles to tell a story and as more generally interchangeable with visual novels. It features a user interface where the game's story is told through text superimposed on an image of the entire screen. The story and interactions in visual novels employ forms of interaction which include menu choices. These menu options often employ additional forms of interaction, including choices with set actions the player can perform or dialogue options that represent the player's character speech or thoughts. The stories in these games progress when the player clicks, taps or presses a button to see the next part of the story.

The story progresses through the perspectives of multiple protagonists. The story begins from the perspective of the character Kayama, a man who is the head of a company in Osaka. As the player progresses, other characters become available to view the story from.

The game includes a chart that is divided into 5-minute intervals. It allows players to choose their main character to view the story from while checking where each character was in each of the time intervals.

After completing certain conditions in the game, a pink bookmark appears on the menu, which leads to a slightly eroticized bonus story in the game.

== Plot ==
Kamaitachi no Yoru ×3 is set one year after the events of Kamaitachi no Yoru 2 (2002). Toru and the other characters who survived the "Prison Island Nursery Rhyme" story arc in the previous game return to the island where the first game is set to mourn the memory of their deceased friends. A new mystery unfolds as a new murder occurs on the island, and the guests find themselves locked in the mansion on the island.

The main scenarios "Pension "Spur" from Banshee's Last Cry and "Prison Island Nursery Rhyme" from Kamaitachi no Yoru 2 are also included in the game.

== Development ==
Kamaitachi no Yoru ×3 was developed by Chunsoft. It is the final installment of trilogy of Kamaitachi no Yoru games. Koichi Nakamura of Chunsoft said that by May 2006, Kamaitachi no Yoru ×3 was far along in development and the game was written to be a conclusion of the series. The "×3" in the title is pronounced as "Triple" and is a reference to the main stories from the previous games being included in the game.

Takemaru Abiko, who wrote the first Kamaitachi no Yoru and contributed to the second game's script, said that following the lower-than-expected sales of Kamaitachi no Yoru 2, the director of the first game, Shinya Ochiai created a draft script for a third game. Abiko said he found the draft interesting. With permission from Ochiai, he began rewriting it for Kamaitachi no Yoru ×3.

== Release ==
On September 9, 2005, Sega announced a partnership agreement with Chunsoft that would have Sega become the Japanese publisher for Chunsoft-developed games, including Kamaitachi no Yoru ×3. The game was released in Japan for the PlayStation 2 on July 27, 2006. In the early days of mobile phone games, companies provided content such as wallpapers and game services for a fixed monthly fee. Kamaitachi no Yoru x3 was made available for some feature phones on February 14, 2007.

A new Kamaitachi no Yoru game followed Kamaitachi no Yoru ×3 with Shin Kamaitachi no Yoru (2011). This game featured all new characters and a story not connected to the previous games.

The Nintendo Direct on June 18, 2024 announced a re-release of Kamaitachi no Yoru ×3 that would be published by Spike Chunsoft. The port is based on the PlayStation 2 version of the game. Among the additions of the 2024 release is the ability to change the in-game music and text to be more reminiscent of the sound and visuals of the original Kamaitachi no Yoru. Project Manager Tomoya Shinozaki of Spike Chunsoft said that graphics were resized to better suit contemporary consoles and that saving times were made faster. It was released for the personal computers through Steam and consoles for the Nintendo Switch and PlayStation 4 on September 19, 2024. The Nintendo Switch release of Kamaitachi no Yoru ×3 was the highest-selling game for consoles in Japan in its first week of release.

== Reception ==
Reviewing the 2024 re-release, a writer for Famitsu said that the most refreshing element of Kamaitachi no Yoru ×3 was the ability to switch between the various protagonists. The reviewer concluded that as the game also included the other three main storylines from Banshee's Last Cry and Kamaitachi no Yoru 2, it would be a perfect entry for players who were new to the series. Kentaro Honji of 4gamer.net recommended that audiences to play the first two main stories included in the game first. They also complimented the higher-resolution imagery in the game, which is sharper than the PlayStation 2 version of the game.

Ryuichi Kataoka of Automaton Media said that there is some old-fashioned nature to the story such as characters using feature phones instead of smartphones and that it was disappointing that it does not contain the full versions of the previous two games. He also found the multiple ending of Kamaitachi no Yoru ×3 did not mesh well with being able to switch between characters and since it took place in the same setting as the second game, the idea of being involved in a murder case in an unknown place was diminished.
