= Under the Dog =

2016 original video animation

- Promotional artwork

アンダー・ザ・ドッグ (Andā za Doggu)
- Genre: Science fiction
- Original video animation
- Directed by: Masahiro Andō
- Produced by: Kōji Morimoto; Yoshirō Kataoka
- Written by: Jiro Ishii; Yukinori Kitajima; Keigo Koyanagi
- Music by: Kevin Penkin
- Studio: Kinema Citrus; Orange
- Released: August 1, 2016
- Runtime: 30 minutes

Under The Dog (Japanese: アンダー・ザ・ドッグ, Hepburn: Andā za Doggu) is a 2016 Japanese original video animation. Originally a collaborative project between Creative Intelligence Arts and Kinema Citrus, and later a project solely produced by Kinema Citrus, it is a Kickstarter-funded anime project, released on August 1, 2016. The anime was supposed to be set in Neo Tokyo in the year 2025, five years after a terrorist attack on the 2020 Tokyo Olympics. To combat future threats, the United Nations force teenagers possessing special abilities into fighting those threats. One member, Anthea Kallenberg, seeks to discover her true identity.

Under the Dog was originally conceived in the late 1990s by Jirō Ishii, intended as a 26-episode series. When the project was resurrected, the team behind it chose to fund it through Kickstarter to retain creative freedom. The staff consisted of Ishii, director Masahiro Andō, producer Hiroaki Yura, character designer Yūsuke Kozaki, and composer Kevin Penkin. Though the project was successfully funded, Creative Intelligence Arts and Kinema Citrus separated due to creative differences, and Kinema Citrus took full control. The split resulted in the replacement of some development staff, including Yura being replaced by Kōji Morimoto and Yoshirō Kataoka and the involvement of Orange.

== Plot ==
The story takes place within Neo Tokyo in the year 2025, five years after a severe terrorist attack at the 2020 Tokyo Olympics. Students possessing special abilities are forced into serving an elite anti-terrorist unit created by the United Nations, fighting against threats including other ability users. If these agents fail their mission, they will be killed along with their families, who have bombs planted within their heads. One member of this covert ops unit, a Swedish girl by the name of Anthea Kallenberg, seeks to find who she really is.

== Characters ==
Anthea Kallenberg (アンシア・カレンバーグ, Anshia Karenbāgu)
Voiced by: Asami Seto
Flowers No.03
A 17-year-old Scandinavian girl. She is the protagonist of Under the Dog. As a member of the Flowers, she is an expert in the methods of infiltration and assassination. Due to her exceptional combat skills, she is widely known and feared among military organizations worldwide. Fearing that Hana may fail her mission, the Flowers deploy Anthea into a pod to capture the target and bring Shunichi to the Flowers. As Anthea reaches the roof, she shoots at the Pandora and gets close trying to break its shield. As it fails, the Pandora sends out his shield and knocks her against a wall. Anthea tries to form a shield around herself, but it is easily overpowered by the Pandora's shield and her skin and clothes starts melting off. While in agony, Anthea uses her ability which negates the Pandora's shield ability. As she begins to regenerate her skin, she grabs her pistol and runs inside her pod to take cover from an incoming missile. Anthea sees that Shunichi is a Pandora, says "Hana, we were wrong again", and shoots Shunichi, thus ending the mission.
Anthea has her Flowers's pendant on two hairclips that are attached to her pigtails.
Hana Togetsu (冬月ハナ, Togetsu Hana)
Voiced by: Rumi Ōkubo
Flowers No.06
A 17-year-old Japanese high school student who loves her family dearly. The OVA episode primarily follows Hana's point of view. Hana's parents and her younger brother were taken hostage after she became a member of the Flowers. She embarks on a secret mission while posing as a transfer student at a public school on Enoshima Island. While undercover, she locates her target named Shunichi Nanase and tries to protect him from a Pandora, a creature that masquerades as a human, and the US military task force that wants to capture the Pandora by any means necessary. Struggling to recover from a previous mission, she is at risk of turning into a Pandora. Hana has the ability to augment her senses, like eyesight and hearing, at will. While she uses her ability, her eyes turn green, resembling a Pandora. The task force work out the Flowers's target and they switch their target to capture to Shunichi instead. As the Pandora set eyes on Shunichi, it chases after him. As Hana needs time to heal from her wounds from battle, she rests but discovers that Shunichi is missing when she awakens and so searches for him. Hana has a shoot out with the task force, but they deploy missiles and she is gravely injured in the blast. As Anthea arrives to secure the mission and rescue Hana, Anthea arrives too late that Hana's wounds have put her in critical mode. Knowing that Hana would not survive, Anthea shoots Hana through the heart, killing her. Hana's last words were for Anthea to protect Shunichi. After Hana's death, her father is looking at a picture of his family and is suddenly receives an injury to his head which leaves him to bleed out, possibly because of the bomb planted in his head previously.
Hana wore her Flowers's pendant on the left side of her hair.
Shunichi Nanase (七瀬俊一, Nanase Shun'ichi)
Voiced by: Kōki Uchiyama
A 16-year-old student at a public school on Enoshima Island. Shunichi is quiet and withdrawn in class, yet Hana appears to have taken a special interest in him. He is the Flower's target throughout the story. Hana's mission is to secure him and bring him to the Flowers. As the US military task force closes onto the school, they find out that the Flowers are here. A Pandora arrives to the school and rips apart the soldiers. Protected with a shield that deflects bullets, nothing could stop it once the Pandora set its eyes on Shunichi. While escaping from the soldiers and Pandora, Shunichi tells Hana about his father running away from home, leaving his mother and him. As Hana needs time to recuperate, she falls asleep and Shunichi went to look for medical supplies to tend her wounds, but was caught by the task force. As Shunichi is taken away on a helicopter, the Pandora attacks every helicopter and takes Shunichi into his hand. Anthea soon shows up and shoots the Pandora's hand off that was holding Shunichi. As the Pandora failed to kill Anthea, it runs towards Shunichi. After the missile hits the school, the Pandora is shielding Shunichi. The Pandora rises and Shunichi has stabbed the Pandora with his pandora blade-like hand. As the Pandora turns into its human form, Shunichi recognizes it as his dad. Shunichi's father turns to black and crumbles into a white sand-like composition. Shunichi's blade hand changes into a Pandora hand and Anthea walks behind Shunichi and shoots him in the head. All along, escaped "Research Subject P" was Shunichi. Shunichi was first cleared as "White", meaning he had no detection of being a Pandora, but later turned to "Black"; the Flowers have never seen this happen.
Sayuri (さゆり, Sayuri)
Voiced by: Haruka Takahashi
Flowers No.08
A 17-year-old Japanese girl and highly intelligent. She has been a member of the Flowers since her early teens. Her expertise is in intelligence gathering, and she often teams up with Estella. After Hana died, Sayuri is seen entering into Hana's house. While entering, Hana's brother calls for his mother, but she is unresponsive. When departing, Sayuri in the backseat of the car seems in the car to be holding the head of Hanas brother—it can be speculated that this is what for Hana says thank you to Anthea. Sayuri shows little to no emotion, even after confirming Estella's kills.
Sayuri Flowers's pendant is on her hair headband.
Estella (エステラ, Esutera)
Voiced by: Naomi Ōzora
Flowers No.02
A 17-year-old Hispanic girl. Estella joined the Flowers at the age of 8, much earlier than any of the other members. She is an excellent sniper and often teams up with Sayuri. While dressed up as a school girl, Estella keeps her sniper rifle setup in a violin case. As Hana is securing her target, Estella shoots down task force snipers and soldiers ready to kill Hana.
It is unknown where Estella placed her Flowers's symbol.
Junichi Amagata (天方順一, Amagata Jun'ichi)
Voiced by: Hiroshi Tsuchida
A 32-year-old teacher at the international school where the seven the Flowers study. He is a NATO veteran who is currently a colonel of the UN forces and has taken command of the Flowers assassination unit. He once saved Anthea from a slave trade organization while he was on a secret mission in Scandinavia. His codename is No. 00. Mr. Amagata looks into why Shunichi was cleared as "White", then turned into a Pandora, which is defined as "Black".

== Development ==
The story for Under the Dog was initially conceived between 1995 and 1996, with a script treatment completed in 1996. Under the Dog was initially planned as a 26-episode anime. The project itself eventually was described as an entry point or "Episode 0" to introduce the world and characters. The project's main aim was to continue the style and atmosphere of earlier science fiction anime like Akira and Ghost in the Shell. The story's main theme was young people forced to face their own or their family's deaths. Its central theme was struggling for freedom, represented on multiple levels. Its tagline, "Our enemy is the light of humanity", represents the story element of people intended to be saviors being branded as enemies, a recurring motif in the anime that inspired it. Instead of going through the usual funding routes, the creative team decided to use Kickstarter to fund the project. Their stated reason was that the current anime market did not allow for the amount of creative control they desired, as the majority of anime production was dictated by a committee, which would have been unwilling to take on Under the Dog as it did not target the core otaku audience. The team also wanted to reach out to an international audience, making Kickstarter a viable funding option. The game's main staff consisted of director Masahiro Andō, producer Hiroaki Yura, the original writer and later co-writer Jirō Ishii, character designer Yūsuke Kozaki, and composer Kevin Penkin. It was produced by Creative Intelligence Arts, with animation by Kinema Citrus and 3D CGI animation by Orange Co.

The project was brought onto Kickstarter as an original 24-minute anime, with potential for future projects set within the Under the Dog universe if the campaign was successful. As part of the later project campaign, it received official endorsements by Hideo Kojima and CyberConnect2 CEO Hiroshi Matsuyama. The project successfully reached its minimum funding goal of $580,000 two days before the Kickstarter closed. At that time, the team were in talks with Netflix and Crunchyroll to distribute the anime worldwide. Their success also promoted the addition of stretch goals, including two prequels, a Los Angeles premier, and production shift to a feature film if funding reached $5.1 million. By the closing of its Kickstarter campaign, the project had raised $878,028. This funding, while sufficient to produce the original anime episode within a tight budget, was not enough to produce future installments in the series. The production costs ended up being higher than anticipated, but the team looked for means to fulfill all the project's initial goals and investor rewards.

After the project was successfully funded, creative differences between Creative Intelligence Arts and Kinema Citrus over the following months concerning their visions for the project prompted the two to part ways in January 2015, with Kinema Citrus taking charge of production. After the split between the two companies, a new staff roster was created and production began in February 2015, which included new producers Kōji Morimoto and Yoshirō Kataoka. Andō and Ishii remained their respective roles. In addition, new staff included character designer and animation director Masahiro Sato, and new writers Yukinori Kitajima and Keigo Koyanagi. Upon being appointed, Morimoto's first task was to assess the anime's financial standing, finding that there was no funding set aside for operational costs, and that some of the rewards promised to backers were more costly than first estimated. To help with this, a new group called Mentat Studios LLC was formed to manage the publicity so the team could focus on animation. The anime was planned to be finished by the spring of 2016, with storyboarding projected to be completed by the summer of 2015 and voice acting by the winter of that year. A new trailer was released in September 2015, showcasing its projected release period. It featured settings and backdrops that were changed from the original reveal trailer to better suit Ishii's original vision. In April 2016, it was revealed on the official website that the anime will release on August 1, 2016, available to those who backed the Kickstarter project. In June 2017, the follow-up to DVD sendings and other support for Under the Dog rewards shipment and figurine refunds ended. The project started in October 2017 the funding for the next chapter.
