= Project Phoenix (upcoming video game) =

- Developer: Creative Intelligence Arts
- Publisher: Creative Intelligence Arts
- Director: Hiroaki Yura
- Producer: Hiroaki Yura
- Programmer: Daniel Dressler
- Artist: Gontaro
- Writer: Yoko Enoki
- Composers: Nobuo Uematsu; Tomoki Miyoshi; Kevin Penkin
- Engine: Unreal Engine
- Platforms: Microsoft Windows, OS X, Linux, PlayStation 4, PlayStation Vita, iOS, Android
- Genres: Real-time strategy, role-playing
- Mode: Single-player

Project Phoenix is an upcoming squad-based, real-time strategy video game being developed by Creative Intelligence Arts. The game also features Japanese role-playing game design influences, and was described as Kickstarter's first Japan-based video game project.

The development team, self-described as "featuring AAA talent", includes staff such as former Final Fantasy series composer Nobuo Uematsu. Violinist Hiroaki Yura serves as the game's director and producer. Its Kickstarter began in September 2013, and, within a month, it raised over USD $1 million from 15,800 backers – over ten times its initial goal. However, its development updates became less frequent, and, by 2019, backers began wondering if the project had failed, with the project going totally dark. Yura began giving updates years later in 2026, stating that the game's development had resumed, though the money from the original Kickstarter had been used up.

== Development ==
In November 2017, former AREA 35 employee Tariq Lacy accused Yura of redirecting the entirety of the Project Phoenix funds to instead fund the video game Tiny Metal. In June 2018 Lacy retracted his accusations as part of a settlement related to defamation claims.

In 2026, Yura gave an interview in which he stated that he received about $800,000 of the final funds due to declined credit cards and Kickstarter's cut. While he was planning on having David Clark, developer of the 2015 Ori and the Blind Forest, be the game's programmer, Ori was a smash hit and Clark ended up starting to develop a sequel instead, by which time development was already delayed by a year. Clark had also agreed to work with only a residual rather than a full salary, which raised the cost of finding a new programmer. Yura was unable to find a new programmer, and, eventually, Project Phoenix completely ran out of money, with Yura switching focus to Tiny Metal and rescuing its failed Kickstarter. However, Yura denied using money from Project Phoenix, saying that he signed a deal for USD $350,000 from a private investment group.

Nevertheless, the allegations of using Project Phoenix funds destroyed fans' faith in the project. Yura resolved to continue developing and self-funding the project, estimating it would be released by the end of 2031 at maximum, though he did not offer refunds to existing backers.

== Reception ==
When the game was first shown, Nathan Grayson of Rock Paper Shotgun described the combat as "impressively interesting", but criticized the fact that "there's not really much to show for it". In 2017, Jason Schreier of Kotaku criticized Project Phoenix as ruining Kickstarter for other developers, claiming that it was "never happening".
