= Time Travelers (video game) =

2012 video game

- Japanese box art
- Developer: Level-5
- Publisher: Level-5
- Director: Jiro Ishii
- Producer: Akihiro Hino
- Writers: Yukinori Kitajima; Jiro Ishii
- Composer: Hideki Sakamoto
- Platforms: Nintendo 3DS, PlayStation Vita, PlayStation Portable
- Release: JP: July 12, 2012
- Genres: Playing cinema, adventure, visual novel
- Mode: Single-player

Time Travelers (Note: Japanese: タイムトラベラーズ, Hepburn: Taimu Toraberāzu) is a video game "without a genre" developed by Level-5 for the Nintendo 3DS, PlayStation Vita, and PlayStation Portable. A demo of the game was included with the release of Level-5's Nintendo 3DS eShop title, Guild01. The game's mystery-themed narrative was penned by Jiro Ishii, who previously directed Chunsoft's acclaimed 2008 visual novel 428: Shibuya Scramble, as well as the 1987 cyberpunk adventure game Imitation City.

== Gameplay ==
Time Travelers is a cinematic interactive drama game with multiple choices. If a main character makes a mistake or dies, the player can reverse time to perform the right action. Their choices are displayed in the flowchart, and the right choices are necessary to advance the story. The game has quick time events, in which players must perform actions by quickly pressing the right button.

Both Nintendo 3DS and PlayStation Vita version can be played using either the touch screen or buttons, while the PlayStation Portable version lacks the touch screen functionality. The Vita version features higher fidelity graphics and larger resolution.

== Plot ==
In 2013, a mysterious hole, called "Lost Hole", emerged from the sky, and along with it, came an enormous explosion that devastated the central Tokyo area and claimed the lives of many. Eighteen years later on April 28, 2031, in a newly rebuilt metropolis, a new event is about to occur, one that could change the fate of the world forever.

The game takes place in a rebuilt central Tokyo. Technology has greatly advanced since the event that took place eighteen years ago, evident by the holographic signs that fill the streets. A building called "Space Elevator" can be seen rising from Tokyo Bay, with the height of two thousand meters above the city. This particular building is what powers the city, although exactly how it is able to generate energy is a mystery.

Mikoto Shindo, a teenage girl who has time travel ability, must gather the fellow time travelers to prevent a second "Lost Hole" disaster and also to stop a terrorist group named "Mysterious Skull".

== Music ==
The music for Time Travelers was composed, arranged, and produced by Hideki Sakamoto.

== Release and reception ==
Reception

Review score
| Publication | Score |
|---|---|
| Famitsu | 9/10, 9/10, 9/10, 9/10 |

Time Travelers was released for the Nintendo 3DS on July 12, 2012.

The four reviewers in Famitsu magazine each gave the game a 9 out of 10 rating. Two of the reviewers highlighted the story as very engaging with one reviewer saying how all the characters stories are intertwined as being the highlight. One reviewer found that the difficulty of the game was relatively low. Two reviewers found the Nintendo 3DS version to be the superior version as it had the text split between the screens.
