= Cross-promotion =

Form of marketing promotion

Cross-promotion is a form of marketing promotion where customers of one product or service are targeted with promotion of a related product. A typical example is cross-media marketing of a brand; for example, Oprah Winfrey's promotion on her television show of her books, magazines and website. Cross-promotion may involve two or more companies working together in promoting a service or product, in a way that benefits both. For example, a mobile phone network may work together with a popular music artist and package some of their songs as exclusive ringtones; promoting these ringtones can benefit both the network and the artist. Some major corporations—Burger King, for example—have a long history of cross-promotion with a range of partners (see Burger King advertising). The Disney Channel has also made extensive use of cross-promotion. Movie tie-ins are good examples of cross-promotion. On occasion, badly planned cross-promotions can backfire spectacularly such as 1992 Hoover free flights promotion fiasco.

Co-marketing and co-branding are particular forms of cross-promotion.

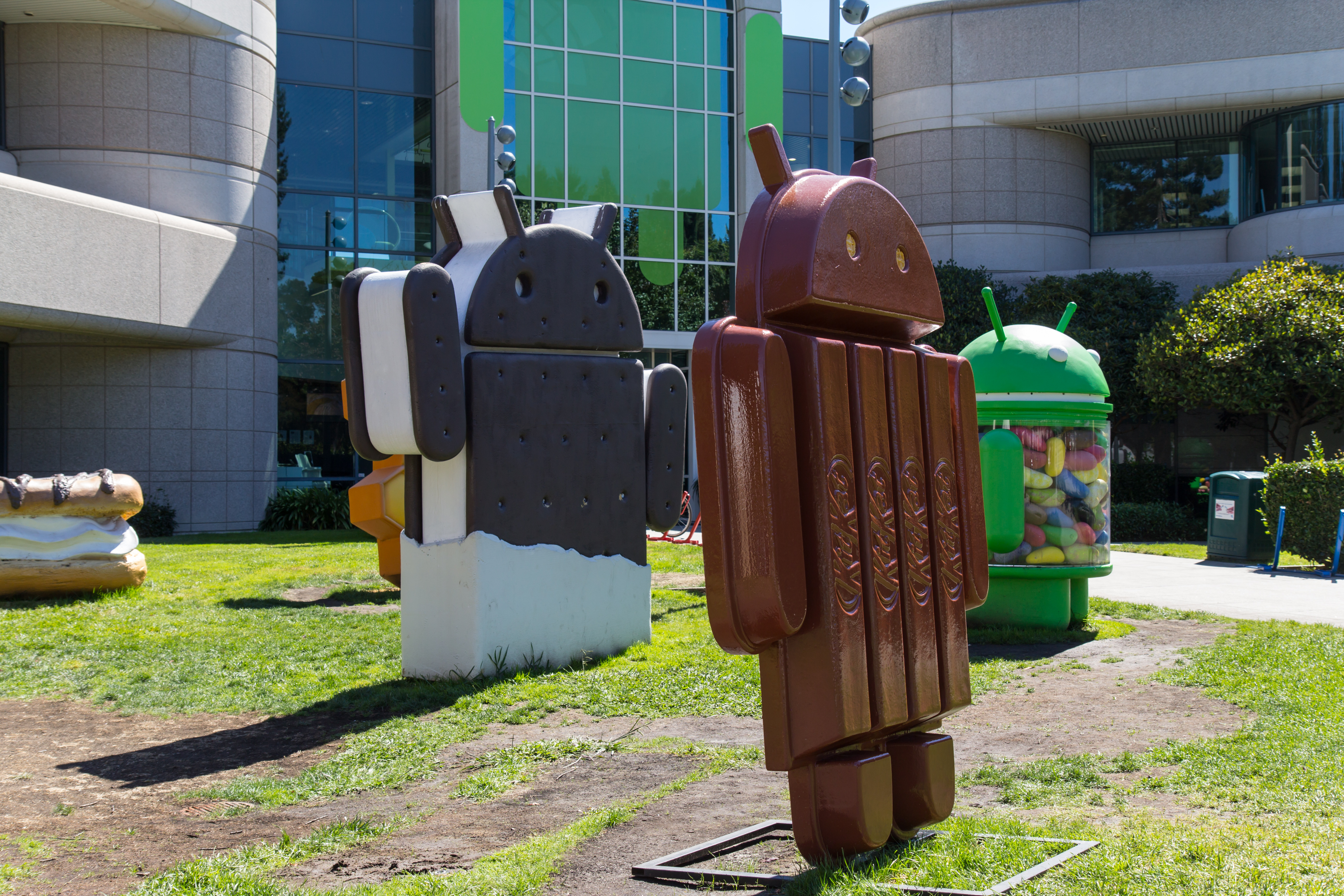
Android 4.x sculpture, the result of a cross-promotion between Google and Nestlé

== Advantages of cross-promotion ==
- Cost of promotion is less
- Win–win situation for both parties
- Cross-promotion marketing is the easiest and often one of the most successful marketing strategies
- Both businesses can promote themselves simultaneously

== Cross-promotion in the media ==
A 2001 study by the Project for Excellence in Journalism found that US media outlets tend to cover their own company's goods and services much more frequently than others but declare the link only 15% of the time. For example, CBS was nearly twice as likely to carry Viacom products as ABC and NBC combined.

In Flat Earth News (2009), Nick Davies wrote that both Tiny Rowland and Robert Maxwell had regularly interfered with their respective UK newspapers to support their business interests.

News Corporation's British newspapers (including The Sun and The Times) were known for their cross-promotion of television provider Sky and its suite of channels, to the point that the satirical current affairs paper Private Eye featured a regular column—"I Sky"—to highlight examples of it. Richard Desmond's 2010 takeover of Channel 5 via his Northern & Shell company was similarly motivated by the opportunities for cross-promotion with his newspapers (Daily Express and Daily Star) and magazines (including OK!); he promised the equivalent of £20 million promoting the channel and its shows in a marketing campaign in Northern & Shell publications. One commentator warned that "readers will be bombarded with references to Five. The opportunity for cross-promotion between his publications and TV channel are enormous."

Comcast has engaged in cross-promotional strategies, internally known as "Symphony" (with internal meetings usually featuring imagery of Arturo Toscanini, who led the NBC Symphony Orchestra) to coordinate the promotion of NBCUniversal content across all of its platforms and properties.
