= Zanki Zero: Last Beginning =

2018 video game

- Developers: Spike Chunsoft, Lancarse
- Publisher: Spike Chunsoft
- Director: Takayuki Sugawara
- Producer: Yoshinori Terasawa
- Designers: Tomohiro Ueda; Kazuya Makinose
- Programmer: Yohei Miyachi
- Artist: Ayako Nakao
- Writer: Takayuki Sugawara
- Composer: Tomomi Ohashi
- Platforms: PlayStation Vita, PlayStation 4, Microsoft Windows
- Release: JP: July 5, 2018; WW: April 9, 2019
- Genre: Dungeon crawler
- Mode: Single-player

Zanki Zero: Last Beginning (Note: Known as ザンキゼロ (Zanki Zero) in Japanese) is a dungeon crawling role-playing video game developed by Spike Chunsoft and Lancarse and published by Spike Chunsoft. It was released for the PlayStation 4 and PlayStation Vita in Japan in July 2018, and PlayStation 4 and Microsoft Windows worldwide in April 2019.

The story is set on island ruins after the destruction of the Earth, leaving behind eight people. Each chapter of the game focuses on a different character, which the player will be controlling. The player can fight enemies throughout the game, most of which being animals, which rewards the player with items upon defeat. The game also features survival game elements, with players having to manage a character's stamina, stress, and bladder needs.

== Release ==
Zanki Zero was released by Spike Chunsoft in Japan on July 5, 2018, and in North America and Europe on April 9, 2019. For the English localization of the game, a new, lower difficulty option was added for players who want to focus on the story and puzzle-solving, and the game balance and the user interface were tweaked. Swimsuits that were available as downloadable content in the Japanese version were also changed to be available in the base game in the English version. Some content had to be changed to be able to release the game on Steam and PlayStation 4 in the West, such as tweaking scenes where a character's underwear could be seen, and removing or changing scenes featuring child characters that could be interpreted as sexual. The cover art for the PlayStation 4 version also had to be modified to meet public storefront display standards.

== Reception ==
Reception

Aggregate score
Aggregator	Score
Metacritic	PS4: 72/100

Review scores
Publication	Score
Destructoid	6.5/10
Famitsu	9/10, 9/10, 8/10, 8/10
GameSpot	6/10
IGN	7.5/10
RPGFan	85%

Zanki Zero received "mixed or average" reviews, according to the review aggregator Metacritic.

The game's PlayStation 4 and PlayStation Vita versions were the fourth and seventh best selling games of the week during their debut week in Japan, selling 15,541 and 9,111 copies, respectively; the PlayStation 4 version sold another 4,164 copies during its second week, bringing total physical Japanese sales of the game to at least 28,816. The PC version was among the best-selling new releases of the month on Steam. (Note: Based on total revenue for the first two weeks on sale.)
