= Hiroaki Yura =

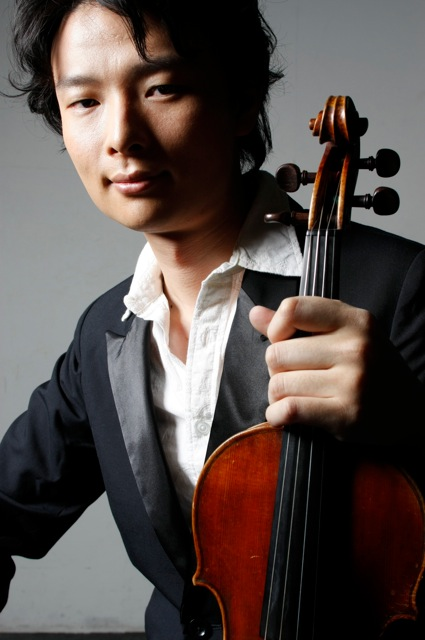
- Hiroaki Yura - Recent

Background information
- Born: July 21, 1981 (age 45); Tokyo, Japan
- Origin: Sydney, New South Wales, Australia
- Occupations: Musician, concertmaster, producer
- Instrument: Violin
- Years active: 1993–present
- Website: hiroakiyura.blogspot.com

Hiroaki Yura (由良 浩明, Yura Hiroaki; born July 21, 1981) is a Japanese violinist, and the founder and artistic director of the Eminence Symphony Orchestra in Sydney, Australia, and the owner and CEO of three Tokyo-based entertainment companies: AREA 35, Inc., SAFEHOUSE, Inc. and Whistler. He was educated at The Scots College in Bellevue Hill. Forbes Japan magazine named Yura as one of their Culture-Preneurs 30 in 2024.

== Video Game & Film Career ==
Yura later founded his own company, Creative Intelligence Arts, which in 2013 announced its first video game project, titled Project Phoenix. In addition, it was announced that Yura would be the project producer for the Under the Dog anime project planned for a 2015 release.

In 2016, Yura founded a new game studio, AREA 35, Inc., alongside the announcement and Kickstarter of their new game, Tiny Metal, a spiritual successor to Advance Wars and other military turn-based strategy games. While the Kickstarter was unsuccessful, the game was still released in 2017 and was followed up by a successor in 2019: Tiny Metal: Full Metal Rumble. Yura has served as Producer on both projects in the Tiny Metal series. At Tokyo Game Show in 2022, Yura announced AREA 35's newest game, Felicity's Door, where he will again serve as Producer, among other roles.

Yura is also the owner of SAFEHOUSE, a production studio based in Tokyo that creates works utilizing Unreal Engine. Through SAFEHOUSE, Yura has been involved in works such as Lupin III: The First, Resident Evil: Infinite Darkness, Forspoken, and Demon Slayer: Infinity Train. In their latest announcement on July 4, 2023, it was revealed that Yura, as part of SAFEHOUSE, would serve as Producer on the series Mobile Suit Gundam: Requiem for Vengeance in partnership with Sunrise.

== Kickstarter projects ==
In 2013, Yura launched a Kickstarter project named Project Phoenix through his new company CIA, Inc. and collected $1,014,600 thanks to 15,802 backers. Project Phoenix had a rough estimated release date of 2018 but has still never been made.

In September 2016, through another new company called Area 35, Inc., he started a new Kickstarter project by the name of TINY METAL, which gathered 1,276 backers but did not reach its funding goal of $50,000. TINY METAL was still produced through alternative funding sources, while Project Phoenix backers had already waited 3 years at that point for their game to be made. His involvement in the TINY METAL game was never stated in the Kickstarter campaign, only known after the game was produced.

In November 2017, Hiroaki Yura was accused by Tariq Lacy of using funds raised from the Kickstarter of Project Phoenix to develop and fund TINY METAL. Later, Lacy admitted that his claims and accusations against Yura and AREA 35 were false.

== Personal life ==
Hiroaki Yura has two sons from a previous marriage.
