= Yoshirō Kataoka =

Japanese producer

Yoshirō Kataoka (片岡 義朗, Kataoka Yoshirō; born April 8, 1945 in Kanagawa Prefecture, Japan), also known by the nickname Hagera, is an anime producer and production designer. He has worked for the Tōkyū Agency, Asatsu DK, and NAS, and he currently works as a full-time advisor at Marvelous Entertainment. His proactive approach to planning anime when he worked at advertising firms has made him a front runner in his field.

Since 2000, Kataoka has worked on the Friday shōjo anime on TV Tokyo, including shows such as Hime-chan's Ribbon. In addition to being an anime producer, Kataoka produces anime musicals. He is also one of the founders of the Animax satellite channel and Aniraji, a radio program devoted to anime, manga, games and light novels.

== Productions ==
- Ashita Tenki ni Naare (producer, Fuji TV)
- Chikkun Takkun (producer, Fuji TV)
- Dancouga – Super Beast Machine God (producer, Ashi)
- Battle Fighters: Fatal Fury (production planning, Fuji TV)
- Battle Fighters: Fatal Fury 2 (production planning, Fuji TV)
- Gu-Gu Ganmo (production planning, Fuji TV)
- Gunslinger Girl (production planning, Fuji TV, Animax)
- Hiatari Ryōkō! (production planning, Fuji TV)
- High School! Kimengumi (producer, Fuji TV, movie)
- Hime-chan's Ribbon (producer, TV Tokyo)
- Hunter x Hunter (production planning, Fuji TV, Animax)
- Kochira Katsushika-ku Kameari Kōen-mae Hashutsujo (executive producer, Toho)
- Kenkō Zenrakei Suieibu Umishō (production planning)
- Mushishi (production planning)
- Peach Girl (production planning, TV Tokyo)
- Sasuga no Sarutobi (producer, Fuji TV)
- School Rumble (production planning, TV Tokyo)
- Shura no Toki - Age of Chaos (production planning, TV Tokyo)
- Tonde Burin (production planning, MBS)
- Touch (producer, Fuji TV)
  - Touch: Sebango no Nai Ace (producer, Toho)
  - Touch 2: Sayonara no Okurimono (producer, Toho)
  - Touch 3: Kimi ga Tōri Sugita Ato ni (producer, Toho)
