= Denfaminico Gamer =

Japanese gaming news website

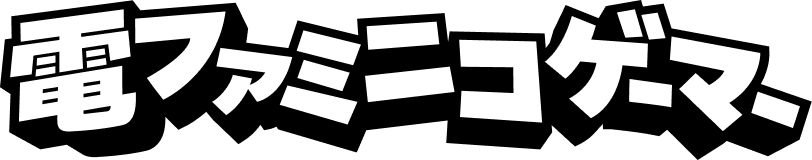

- Screenshot of the website in August 2026
- Native name: 電ファミニコゲーマー
- Romanized name: Denfaminikogēmā
- Company type: Video game journalism
- Website type: News website
- Available in: Japanese
- Founded: February 8, 2016
- Headquarters: Nakahara-ku, Kawasaki, Kanagawa Prefecture, Japan
- Area served: Japan
- Owner: Shinichi Taira
- Editor: Shinichi Taira (TAITAI)
- President: Shinichi Taira
- Parent: Mare Co., Ltd.
- Website: news.denfaminicogamer.jp
- Advertising: yes
- Commercial: yes

Denfaminico Gamer (Japanese: 電ファミニコゲーマー, Hepburn: Denfaminikogēmā; sometimes shortened to Denfami (電ファミ)) is a Japanese video game news website by Mare Co., Ltd. (株式会社マレ, Kabushiki-gaisha Mare) It was founded in February 2016 as a collaboration between Dengeki, Famitsu, Niconico and 4Gamer.net. It became a part of Dwango before becoming independent in July 2019.

== Overview ==
Denfaminico Gamer website and mobile app were launched on February 8, 2016, by Reinforce (リインフォース), a subsidiary of Kadokawa. It is a collaboration of gaming media companies Famitsu, 4Gamer.net, Dengeki and Niconico, who were previously rivals. The name was a portmanteau of the companies (Dengeki, Famitsu, Niconico, 4Gamer.net). In August 2016, Reinforce was integrated to the Dwango's news business division. In February 2019, Dwango planned to sell the website following restructuring as it deemed the website an "unprofitable division". Although Dwango eliminated other divisions by March, Denfaminico Gamer was given a budget until June to give time for a buyer. In May, they approached 10 companies, but Shinichi Taira, the editor-in-chief of Denfaminico Gamer and former associate editor at 4Gamer.net, decided to buy the website. On July 1, Dwango sold and transferred the operation of the website to a new company founded by Taira called Mare Co., Ltd. On March 17, 2023, the website announced that it would adopt ChatGPT's GPT-4 as its news writer.

Denfaminico Gamer is a video game news website. Harbor Business Online described the website as excelling in interviews. Featuring long articles instead of dividing it between pages. It has been described as one of Japan's leading gaming news outlets. Paid articles were not implemented on the website as Taira is a critic of the subscription business model, adding that he feels "it is wrong to create paywalled articles, as it would be a disadvantage for the people who agreed to be interviewed".

On May 31, 2017, manga artist Keiichi Tanaka serialized a new manga series on the website titled Waka-ge no Itari ~Gēmu Kurieitā no Seishun~. It is a report manga about his memories of working alongside game creators who were active from the 1980s to the 1990s.

The company is headquartered in Nakahara-ku, Kawasaki, Kanagawa Prefecture. The current editor-in-chief is Shinichi Taira, also known by his nickname in the site as TAITAI.
