= Tiny Metal =

2017 video game

- Steam cover art
- Developer: Area 35
- Publisher: Unties
- Director: Hiroaki Yura
- Platforms: PlayStation 4 Nintendo Switch; Windows
- Release: 21 December 2017
- Genre: Turn-based tactics

Tiny Metal is a turn-based tactics video game developed by Area 35 and published by Unties. It was released for PlayStation 4, Nintendo Switch, and Windows in December 2017.

A follow-up, Tiny Metal: Full Metal Rumble, was released in July 2019 on Nintendo Switch and PC. A titled sequel, Tiny Metal 2, is scheduled to be released in 2026. An anime adaptation, titled Tiny Metal: Zero Line, has been announced.

== Gameplay ==
Tiny Metal is a military-themed turn-based tactics video game.

== Development ==
Tiny Metal is the debut game from Japanese video game development studio Area 35. The studio was founded in August 2016 by Hiroaki Yura who directed the game. At the game's release the studio had six full-time developers. Key influences of the game include Advance Wars and Warhammer 40,000.

The game was released on PlayStation 4, Nintendo Switch and Windows on 21 December 2017. The game was published by Unties, an indie gaming label that is part of Sony Music.

== Reception ==
Reception

Aggregate score
Aggregator	Score
Metacritic	71/100 (PC); 65/100 (Switch)

Review scores
Publication	Score
Destructoid	5/10
GameSpot	7/10
IGN	6.8/10
Nintendo Life	9/10
Hardcore Gamer	4/5

Tiny Metal received "mixed or average" reviews from critics according to review aggregator Metacritic.

== Anime adaptation ==
An anime adaptation, titled Tiny Metal: Zero Line, was announced in July 2026. The anime will be produced by Safehouse and directed by Hiroyasu Kobayashi, with Yūsuke Kozaki designing the characters.
