= Jiro Ishii =

Japanese video game and anime producer

- Occupation: Director
- Notable work: 428: Shibuya Scramble

Jiro Ishii (イシイジロウ, Ishii Jirō) is a Japanese video game developer and television and anime producer. He is best known for directing the live-action visual novel 428: Shibuya Scramble, producing the adventure video game Nine Hours, Nine Persons, Nine Doors, and creating the original concept for the anime short Under the Dog which was funded on Kickstarter.

== Biography ==
Jiro Ishii started his career working on early PC games at Data West. He got a job at Chunsoft in 2000. In 2008, he directed 428: Shibuya Scramble, a live-action visual novel which earned a perfect score from Famitsu magazine, only the ninth game ever to do so. He moved to Level-5 to write and direct Time Travelers in 2012. Finally, he left to go freelance in 2015.

== Works ==
=== Video games ===
Release	Title	System	Role(s)
1987	Imitation City	PC-88	Creator
1993	Night Slashers	Arcade	
1996	Air Walkers	Arcade	Character Designer
1997	Little Lovers	PC	
1998	Little Lovers 2nd. Yui	PC	
1999	Little Lovers: She So Game	PlayStation	
2002	Shiren the Wanderer Gaiden: Asuka the Swordswoman	Dreamcast, Microsoft Windows	Game balance
2002	Kamaitachi no Yoru Advance	Game Boy Advance	Director
2004	3rd grade B group Kinpachi sensei Stand on the legendary platform!	PlayStation 2	Director
2005	Pokémon Mystery Dungeon: Blue Rescue Team and Red Rescue Team	Game Boy Advance, Nintendo DS	Game planner
2006	Banshee's Last Cry: Niwango version	mobile phone, web	Producer
2007	Imabikisō	PlayStation 3	Producer
2008	428: Shibuya Scramble	Nintendo Wii	Director, writer
2009	Nine Hours, Nine Persons, Nine Doors	Nintendo DS	Producer
2010	TRICK × LOGIC	PlayStation Portable	Producer
2012	Time Travelers	Nintendo 3DS	Director, writer
2013	Devil Station	mobile phone	Director, world concept
2015	Monster Strike	Nintendo 3DS	Story project structure
2019	Sakura Wars	PlayStation 4	Story structure
2022	CrimeSight	PC (Steam)	World view setting and supervision
2022	Zombie of the Dot	iOS, Android	Story planning, drafting and supervising
2028	Shibuya Scramble Stories		Director

=== Anime ===
Release	Title	Role(s)
2009	Canaan	Producer
2012	Wooser's Hand-to-Mouth Life	Episode 7 screenwriter
2015	Monster Strike	Story, project composition
2016	BBK/BRNK	Series composition, screenplay
2016	Under the Dog	Original concept

=== Film and television ===
- The Arrival of Spring for a Shogi Girl (女流棋士の春, Joryuu kishi no haru) - director
- Another - production manager
