= Cross-media marketing =

Form of marketing promotion

Cross-media marketing is a form of cross-promotion in which promotional companies commit to surpassing traditional advertisement techniques and decide to include extra appeals to the products they offer. The material can be communicated by any mass media such as e-mails, letters, web pages, social media or other recruiting sources. This method can be extremely successful for publishers because the marketing increases the ad's profit from a single advertiser, as well as generates a good liaison between the advertiser and the publisher, which also boosts the profits. The integration of social media marketing into the marketing mix empowers firms to promote goods and services. It facilitates real-time interaction, fostering engagement and swift feedback. This approach enhances customer satisfaction by offering personalized experiences and addressing inquiries promptly. Effective social media utilization enables companies to build, sustain, and bolster their competitive edge in the digital realm.

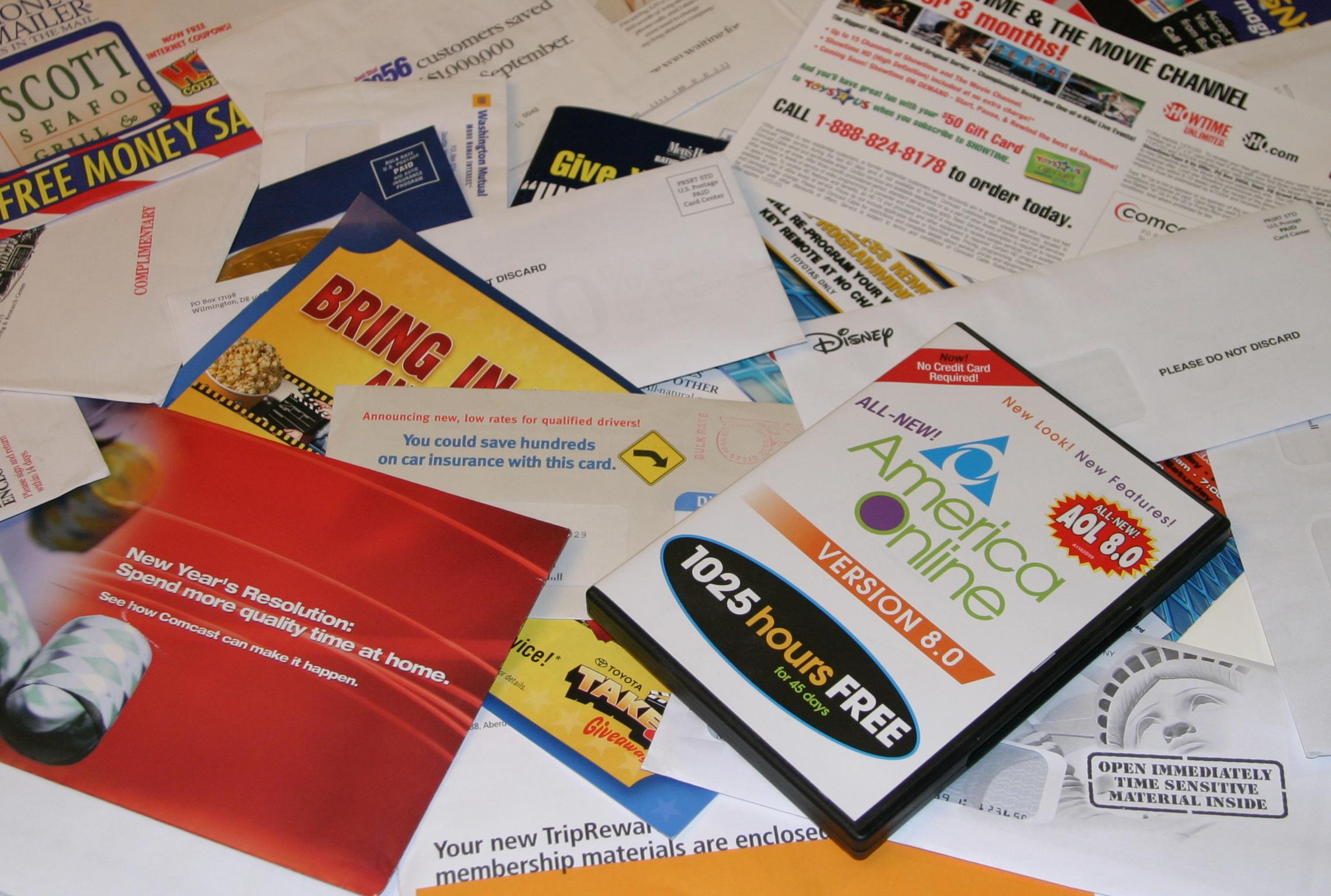
Typical "junk mail"

== History ==
The Beatles' A Hard Day's Night was heralded by the release of a number one single and number one soundtrack album of the same name. Cross media marketing also occurred in 1977 with the release of the film Saturday Night Fever and its respective soundtrack. The single "How Deep Is Your Love" by The Bee Gees was originally meant to be recorded by Yvonne Elliman for an unrelated album, but it was decided by RSO Records to have The Bee Gees record it and released in an effort to promote the film. The release of the film promoted not only the released single but the entire soundtrack.

More recent examples include companies promoting music artist's concerts, followed by having one of the artist's songs used in a commercial for the company.

== "Commandments" of cross-media marketing ==
Cross-media marketing programs are difficult to advertise. Damien Marchi, who was involved in the second season of Big Brother in France, created eight commandments to follow for cross-media marketing success:

1. Give users access to exclusive content not seen on television. During a TV or movie production usually more material is shot than can be shown. Users like this unused content exclusively, for example on the Internet, through a club.
2. Interact with the show- Give the power to the audience. Involve the audience by having them vote, ask questions and by polling them
3. Make the show even more known. Use besides television the other media to keep the users in touch with the show.
4. Increases users’ loyalty. Loyalty of fans can be stimulated by a fan club and viral games.
5. Recreate the atmosphere. Levy the atmosphere of the TV show to another medium.
6. Continue the show on the web. Use the TV show to drive the other devices
7. Enhance the watching experience. Stimulate simultaneous use of media (browse the Internet when watching TV for example).
8. Use multiple devices. A multi-device system built around a TV show allows channel to increase the number of revenue streams.

== Real-time personalization and variable data printing ==
Real-time personalization (RTP) has the ability to see who visits each webpage. In addition, if companies have the ability to see a website viewed by a potential customer, then the company can quickly personalize what the customer is looking and make appeals to a certain product. After a real time personalization search, a business plan is created to fit each potential customer. When a potential buyer is looking at a company's advertisement, a popup ad usually appears. Every product that a customer accepts, five to seven linked advertisement pages popup. RTP captures these acceptance rates, locate advertising company, and supplies the information necessary for the next step in the business plan.

Variable data printing (VDP) constantly modernizes and enhances the communication between the marketing company and their customers. In addition, if a campaign is personalized and directed to a specific audience, then more customers will typically buy the product. Therefore, VDP creates a cycle of potential customers leading to increased profitability, brand awareness, and the bottom-line sales. All of these elements are needed to enhance the marketing processes.

== Customized offers ==
For mail, companies use the information collected from their customer analysis to provide the individuals with personalized letters or upcoming offers. On the internet, customization permits users to have access to exclusive messaging. In addition, the VDP assists the marketing process by talking to each specific group of customers and giving them personal attention rather than treating them all the same way. This consumer and company process is very common in large online retailers such as Amazon.com. The more personalized an offer is to the target audience, the more prone they are to react positively.

Some of the data that can be investigated to strengthen personalizing the offer includes:

- Personal information including the customer's age, gender and the environment where they live (town, city, etc.);
- Calculating the date of expiration of a customer's magazine subscription is very important because then the marketing company is able send the individual a notice about re-subscribing;
- Keeping track of a customer's involvement and acceptance rate in the company's offers is very essential. If a customer is providing the company with constant business than sending them an offer for in store redemption is common courtesy.

== Problems ==
One of the major problems with cross-media marketing is the creative development level. Getting one group to collectively use their creativity and communicate with the other areas of work is very difficult when one team is working on television, another is involved in designing the print creative, another is developing radio ads, and yet another is putting together the Internet program. Although the messaging elements are not very hard to compose, creating a campaign that is completely mutually dependent, with each branch of the project fulfilling their task, is quite impossible when the creative teams are split. Therefore, to achieve some sort of cohesion, teams must communicate and corporate with each branch.

== Examples ==
Alto Clothing
Alto Clothing is an online company that sells garments for tall males. In 2005, Alto opened a cross-media marketing effort with the assistance of an agency called Neoco. The clothing company was looking to increase sales and publicity of the line; therefore, they created an ecommerce site. Alto plans on using a mixture of viral, press, and online activity. The ads will be shown on high-profile sites such as Time Out. In addition, an email campaign will be sent to 100,000 men.

"Andres and Henriette"
In 2003, a financial marketing company in Denmark series on the internet entitled Anders and Henriette, as a cross-media marketing scheme to promote their financial assistance program. The production was about a young couple that was going to live together. The series of eight episodes was a major success because it attracted 300,000 individuals, in which ninety percent of them viewed the site again. Consequently, the campaign made the name of the financial foundation a well-known brand name.

== See also ==
- Product placement
- Real-time marketing
- Digital marketing
- Tie-in
