= Machi (video game) =

1998 video game

- Developer: Chunsoft
- Publisher: Chunsoft
- Director: Kazuya Asano
- Producers: Koichi Nakamura; Toshiki Kobuko
- Programmer: Hidefumi Itano
- Writer: Shukei Nagasaka
- Composers: Kota Kato; Chiyoko Mitsumata; Hideyuki Hayashi; Shoji Morito; Shinichi Itakura
- Platforms: Sega Saturn; PlayStation; PlayStation Portable
- Release: Sega Saturn: JP: January 22, 1998; PlayStation: JP: January 28, 1999; PlayStation Portable: JP: July 30, 2006
- Genres: Adventure, visual novel
- Mode: Single-player

Machi (街, literally "City") is a visual novel developed and published by Chunsoft, originally released in 1998 for the Sega Saturn. It was ported for the PlayStation in 1999 (retitled Machi: Unmei no Kōsaten), (Note: 街 〜運命の交差点〜; lit. "City: The Intersection of Fate") and for the PlayStation Portable in 2006 as Machi: Unmei no Kōsaten - Tokubetsu-hen. (Note: 街 〜運命の交差点〜 特別篇; lit. "City: The Intersection of Fate － Special Version")

== Gameplay ==
Machi features a branching narrative, consisting of players using eight characters at the start of the game.

=== Characters ===
- Keima Amemiya: a detective
- Jintarō Umabe: an actor
- Masami Ushio: a gangster
- Yoshiko Hosoi: a part-time worker
- Masashi Shinoda: a university student
- Ryūji Takamine: a legion deserter
- Fumiyasu Ichikawa: a screenwriter
- Yōhei Tobisawa: a popular high school student
- Atsushi Takamine: Ryuji's father
- Norio Aoi: a pariah
- Isamu Sagiyama: an assistant director
- Patrick Dandy: a marriage swindler
- Shōjirō Kaizuka: a politician

== Reception ==
Reception

Review score
Publication	Score
Famitsu	33/40

Machi sold 164,866 copies in Japan. Famitsu scored the game 33 out of 40. It ranked fifth at the top 100 reader poll of their favorite games of all time.

In 2017, Famitsu readers voted it one of the top five adventure games of all time.

== Legacy ==
A proposed sequel to Machi was cancelled, but a chapter of it was adapted as a 1998 television miniseries Tōmei Shōjo Ea (Invisible Girl Ea). 428: Shibuya Scramble is set in the same location with many references.
