= Spike Chunsoft =

Japanese video game development company

Spike Chunsoft Co., Ltd.

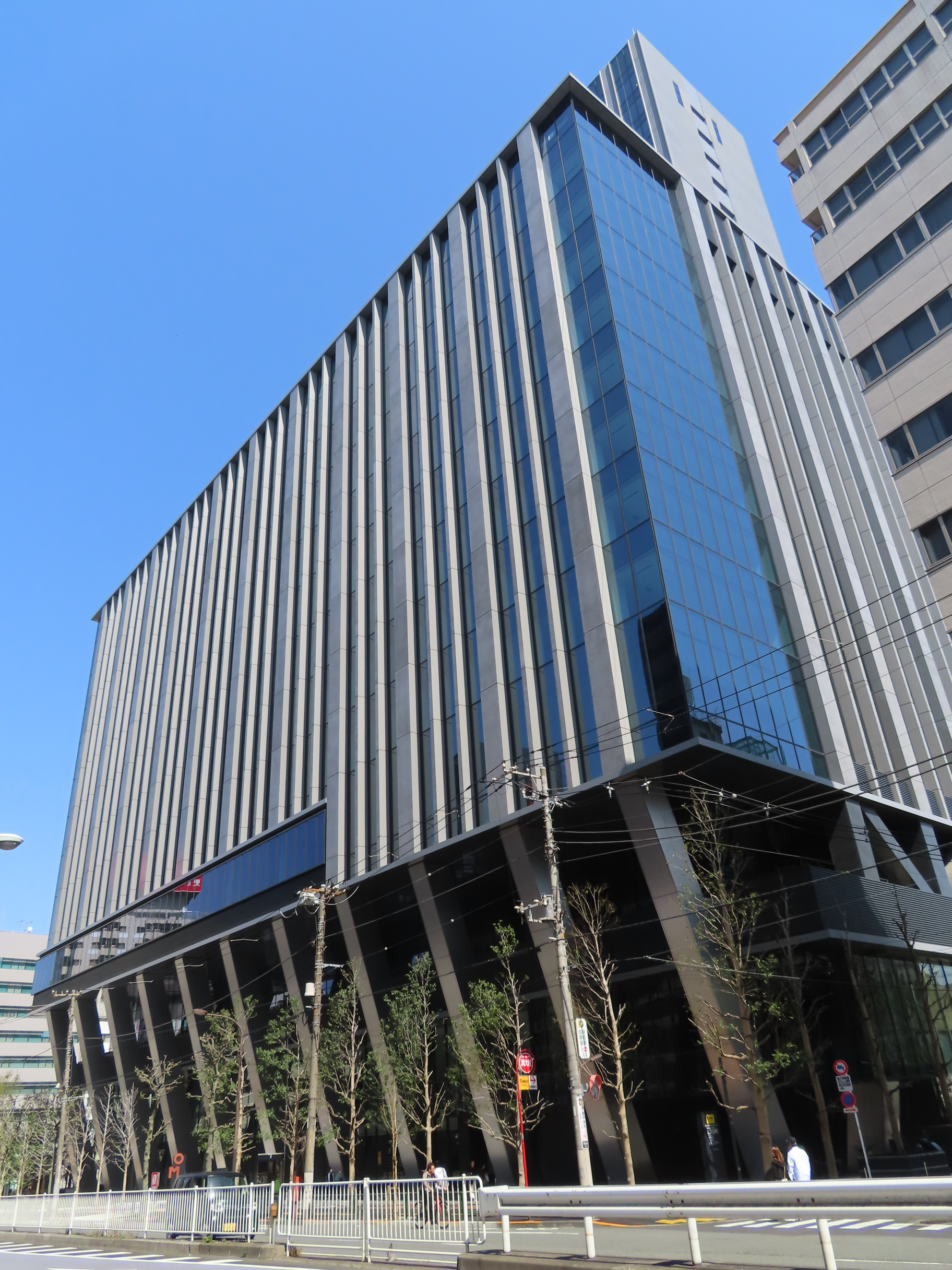
- Headquarters in Shinagawa, Tokyo
- Native name: 株式会社スパイク・チュンソフト
- Romanized name: Kabushiki-gaisha Supaiku Chunsofuto
- Formerly: Chunsoft Co., Ltd. (1984–2012)
- Type: Subsidiary
- Industry: Video games
- Predecessor: Spike Co., Ltd.
- Founded: April 9, 1984; 42 years ago
- Founder: Koichi Nakamura
- Headquarters: Nishigotanda, Shinagawa, Tokyo, Japan
- Key people: Mitsutoshi Sakurai (president, representative director); Hiroyuki Kaneko (director); Tatsuro Suzuki (director); Sadahiro Hayashi (auditor); Seiichiro Nagahata (executive officer); Yasuhiro Iizuka (executive officer); Koji Yukita (executive officer); Norihiro Takahashi (executive officer)
- Products: Chunsoft: Dragon Quest series; Sound Novel series; Mystery Dungeon series; Zero Escape series; The Portopia Serial Murder Case; Spike: Fire Pro Wrestling series; Dragon Ball Z: Budokai Tenkaichi series; Danganronpa series; Conception series; Kenka Bancho series
- Revenue: ¥480.9 million; (2023)
- Operating income: ▲¥2.1 billion (2023); ¥1.7 billion (2022)
- Net income: ▲¥764.3 million (2023); ¥575.4 million (2022)
- Total assets: ▲¥4.6 billion (2023); ¥4.4 billion (2022)
- Number of employees: 260 (2024)
- Parent: Dwango
- Subsidiaries: Spike Chunsoft, Inc.
- Website: spike-chunsoft.com

Spike Chunsoft Co., Ltd. (Note: Japanese: 株式会社スパイク・チュンソフト, Hepburn: Kabushiki-gaisha Supaiku Chunsofuto) is a Japanese video game development and localization company specializing in role-playing video games, visual novels and adventure games. The company was founded in 1984 as Chunsoft Co., Ltd. and merged with Spike in 2012. It is owned by Dwango.

It created games such as the first five Dragon Quest installments and the Mystery Dungeon franchise as Chunsoft, and the Conception series as Spike Chunsoft. They also developed titles such as the Sound Novel series (consisting of Otogirisō, Kamaitachi no Yoru, Machi and 428: Shibuya Scramble) and the Zero Escape series, and the Famicom port of The Portopia Serial Murder Case as Chunsoft. Spike developed Danganronpa before the merger.

The logo of Chunsoft before the Spike merger

== History ==
=== Chunsoft ===
Chunsoft was founded by Koichi Nakamura. The "Chun" in the company name is from the first kanji Naka (中) of the company founder's name; Naka is read as "Chun" in Japanese Mahjong. This name would also appear in Nakamura's first work with Enix, titled Door Door in 1983.

Chunsoft was founded as a company on April 9, 1984. Otogirisō marked Chunsoft's debut brand. Following that, successive genre-trailblazing titles Torneko no Daibōken: Fushigi no Dungeon, Kamaitachi no Yoru, and Shiren the Wanderer established the company's good reputation. Nakamura himself had to move away from programming in order to run the company.

For a time, the company's products were considered mediocre, but 3-Nen B-Gumi Kinpachi Sensei: Densetsu no Kyoudan ni Tate! was a hit that showed signs of recovery. During the development of Pokémon Mystery Dungeon: Red Rescue Team and Blue Rescue Team, Kouji Malta, one of the programmers for these two games, and contributed previously on EarthBound and Shiren the Wanderer 2, stated the company went through bad business performance, as employees from Chunsoft would leave the company progressively due to this issue. The game's success not only helped giving more popularity in the Mystery Dungeon franchise, it also helped Chunsoft from avoiding bankruptcy. Later in 2005, it was bought by Dwango and became a subsidiary of the company.

Before the project, Sega were helping Chunsoft in developing and releasing its games for the Dreamcast. From 2005 to 2010, Sega have made a collaboration with Chunsoft titled "SEGA×CHUN PROJECT". Their goal was to provide support and sales for development funds, such as the Nintendo DS remake of Mystery Dungeon: Shiren the Wanderer or 428: Shibuya Scramble.

=== Merger ===
In 2012, Chunsoft merged with its sister company Spike and the new company would be called Spike Chunsoft.

=== Subsidiary ===
In 2017, Spike Chunsoft established a North American subsidiary based in Long Beach, California to carry out localization and publishing of its own games, in addition to games by its sister company 5pb./Mages under a newly formed partnership. Their first game under the Mages partnership was the Microsoft Windows version of Steins;Gate, taking over publishing of the game from Mages in 2018; it has since continued publishing further games in the Science Adventure series, including Steins;Gate 0 and Chaos;Child.

On July 16, 2020, NIS America announced that Danganronpa games on the PlayStation Store will be removed. Spike Chunsoft subsequently announced on July 22, 2020, that it will take on publishing the Danganronpa series outside of Japan. Similarly, the Nintendo Switch and Microsoft Windows release of Shiren the Wanderer: The Tower of Fortune and the Dice of Fate would not be released by Aksys but by its subsidiary.

== Works ==
=== Chunsoft ===
==== Developed ====
Year	Title	Platform	Publisher	Ref.
1983	Door Door mkII	PC-8801, Nintendo Entertainment System	Enix	
1985	The Portopia Serial Murder Case	Nintendo Entertainment System	Enix	
1986	Dragon Quest	Nintendo Entertainment System	Enix	
1987	Dragon Quest II	Nintendo Entertainment System	Enix	
1988	Dragon Quest III	Nintendo Entertainment System	Enix	
1989	Jesus	Nintendo Entertainment System	King Records	
1990	Dragon Quest IV	Nintendo Entertainment System	Enix	
1991	Famicom Jump II: Saikyō no Shichinin	Nintendo Entertainment System	Bandai	
1991	Tetris 2 + BomBliss	Nintendo Entertainment System	Bullet-Proof Software	
1992	Dragon Quest V	Super Nintendo Entertainment System	Enix	
1992	Otogirisō	Super Nintendo Entertainment System, PlayStation, Mobile	Chunsoft	
1993	Dragon Quest I & II	Super Nintendo Entertainment System	Enix	
1993	Torneko's Great Adventure	Super Nintendo Entertainment System	Chunsoft	
1994	Banshee's Last Cry	Super Nintendo Entertainment System, PlayStation, Game Boy Advance, Mobile, Web browser	Chunsoft	
1995	Mystery Dungeon: Shiren the Wanderer	Super Nintendo Entertainment System, Nintendo DS	Chunsoft	
1998	Machi	Saturn, PlayStation, Mobile, PlayStation Portable	Chunsoft; Sega (PSP)	
1999	Torneko: The Last Hope	PlayStation, Game Boy Advance	Enix	
2000	Shiren the Wanderer 2: Shiren's Castle and the Oni Invasion	Nintendo 64	Nintendo	
2001	Shiren the Wanderer GB2: Magic Castle of the Desert	Game Boy Color, Nintendo DS	Chunsoft; Sega (DS)	
2002	Kamaitachi no Yoru 2	PlayStation 2, Mobile, PlayStation Portable	Chunsoft; Sega (PSP)	
2002	Torneko's Great Adventure 3	PlayStation 2, Game Boy Advance	Enix	
2004	Shiren Monsters: Netsal	Game Boy Advance	Chunsoft	
2004	3-Nen B-Gumi Kinpachi Sensei	PlayStation 2	Chunsoft	
2004	The Nightmare of Druaga	PlayStation 2	Arika (JP); Namco (NA)	
2005	Homeland	GameCube	Chunsoft	
2005	Pokémon Mystery Dungeon: Blue Rescue Team and Red Rescue Team	Game Boy Advance, Nintendo DS	Nintendo; The Pokémon Company	
2006	Kamaitachi no Yoru ×3	PlayStation 2	Sega	
2007	Pokémon Mystery Dungeon: Explorers of Time and Explorers of Darkness	Nintendo DS	Nintendo; The Pokémon Company	
2007	Imabikisō	PlayStation 3, Wii	Sega	
2008	Shiren the Wanderer	Wii, PlayStation Portable	Sega (JP); Atlus USA (NA); Spike (PSP)	
2008	428: Shibuya Scramble	Wii, PlayStation 3, PlayStation Portable	Spike	
2009	Pokémon Mystery Dungeon: Explorers of Sky	Nintendo DS	Nintendo; The Pokémon Company	
2009	Pokémon Mystery Dungeon: Adventure Team	Wii	The Pokémon Company	
2009	999: Nine Hours, Nine Persons, Nine Doors	Nintendo DS	Spike (JP); Aksys Games (NA/EU)	
2010	Shiren the Wanderer 4: The Eye of God and the Devil's Navel	Nintendo DS	Spike	
2010	Shiren the Wanderer: The Tower of Fortune and the Dice of Fate	Nintendo DS	Chunsoft	
2011	Zombie Daisuki	Nintendo DS	Chunsoft	
2011	Wii Play: Motion	Wii	Nintendo	
2011	Shin Kamaitachi no Yoru	PlayStation 3, PlayStation Vita	Chunsoft	
2012	Zero Escape: Virtue's Last Reward	Nintendo 3DS, PlayStation Vita	Chunsoft	

==== Published only ====
Year	Title	Platform	Developer	Ref.
1996	Shiren the Wanderer GB: Monster of Moonlight Village	Game Boy, Windows, Android	Aquamarine; Chunsoft (Android)	
2002	Shiren the Wanderer Gaiden: Asuka the Swordswoman	Windows	Neverland	

=== Spike Chunsoft ===
This table includes video games published internationally by Spike Chunsoft's American subsidiary Spike Chunsoft, Inc. since its foundation on December 1, 2017. Outside of titles from Spike Chunsoft in Japan, the company publishes titles from Mages (which was also part of Spike Chunsoft's parent company Dwango until July 2019) and from other companies.

Year	Title	Platform	Developer	Publisher	Ref.
2012	Conception	PlayStation Portable, PlayStation 4, Windows	Chime	Spike Chunsoft	
2012	Kenka Banchō Bros. Tokyo Battle Royale	PlayStation Portable	Bullets	Spike Chunsoft	
2012	Danganronpa: Trigger Happy Havoc	PlayStation Vita, Windows, macOS, Linux, PlayStation 4, iOS, Android, Nintendo Switch, Xbox One	Spike Chunsoft	Spike Chunsoft	
2012	Danganronpa 2: Goodbye Despair	PlayStation Portable, PlayStation Vita, Windows, macOS, Linux, PlayStation 4, iOS, Android, Nintendo Switch, Xbox One	Spike Chunsoft	Spike Chunsoft	
2012	Shiren the Wanderer 4: The Eye of God and the Devil's Navel	PlayStation Portable	Spike Chunsoft	Spike Chunsoft	
2012	Fire Pro Wrestling	Xbox 360	Spike Chunsoft	Microsoft Studios	
2012	Dragon Ball Z: For Kinect	Xbox 360	Spike Chunsoft	Namco Bandai Games	
2012	Pokémon Mystery Dungeon: Gates to Infinity	Nintendo 3DS	Spike Chunsoft	Nintendo; The Pokémon Company	
2013	Banshee's Last Cry	iOS, Android	Spike Chunsoft	Spike Chunsoft	
2013	999: Nine Hours, Nine Persons, Nine Doors	iOS	Spike Chunsoft	Spike Chunsoft	
2013	Warrior's Way	Nintendo 3DS	Spike Chunsoft	Nintendo	
2013	Conception II: Children of the Seven Stars	Nintendo 3DS, PlayStation Vita, Windows	Chime	Spike Chunsoft	
2013	Attack on Titan: Humanity in Chains	Nintendo 3DS	Spike Chunsoft	Examu	
2013	Heroes VS	PlayStation Portable	Spike Chunsoft	Bandai Namco Entertainment	
2014	Sekai Seifuku: Costume Fes.	PlayStation Vita	Spike Chunsoft	Spike Chunsoft	
2014	Danganronpa Another Episode: Ultra Despair Girls	PlayStation Vita, Windows, PlayStation 4	Spike Chunsoft	Spike Chunsoft	
2014	Fossil Fighters: Frontier	Nintendo 3DS	Spike Chunsoft	Nintendo	
2014	J-Stars Victory VS	PlayStation 3, PlayStation Vita	Spike Chunsoft	Bandai Namco Entertainment	
2015	Danganronpa: Unlimited Battle	iOS, Android	Spike Chunsoft	Spike Chunsoft	
2015	Kenka Bancho 6: Soul & Blood	Nintendo 3DS	Studio Zan	Spike Chunsoft	
2015	Ukiyo no Shishi	PlayStation 3	Spike Chunsoft	Spike Chunsoft	
2015	Ukiyo no Roushi	PlayStation Vita	Spike Chunsoft	Spike Chunsoft	
2015	Shiren the Wanderer: The Tower of Fortune and the Dice of Fate	PlayStation Vita, Nintendo Switch, Windows, iOS, Android	Spike Chunsoft	Spike Chunsoft	
2015	Mystery Chronicle: One Way Heroics	PlayStation 4, PlayStation Vita, Windows	Spike Chunsoft	Spike Chunsoft	
2015	Exist Archive	PlayStation 4, PlayStation Vita	Spike Chunsoft; Tri-Ace	Spike Chunsoft	
2015	Etrian Mystery Dungeon	Nintendo 3DS	Spike Chunsoft	JP: Atlus; NA: Atlus USA; EU: NIS America	
2015	J-Stars Victory VS+	PlayStation 3, PlayStation 4, PlayStation Vita	Spike Chunsoft	Bandai Namco Entertainment	
2015	Pokémon Super Mystery Dungeon	Nintendo 3DS	Spike Chunsoft	Nintendo; The Pokémon Company	
2016	Kenka Bancho Otome	PlayStation Vita	Red Entertainment	Spike Chunsoft	
2016	Zero Time Dilemma	Nintendo 3DS, PlayStation Vita, Windows, PlayStation 4, Xbox One	Chime	Spike Chunsoft	
2016	Mario & Sonic at the Rio 2016 Olympic Games	Nintendo 3DS	Spike Chunsoft	Nintendo	
2016	One Piece: Burning Blood	PlayStation 4, PlayStation Vita	Spike Chunsoft	Bandai Namco Entertainment	
2017	Danganronpa V3: Killing Harmony	Nintendo Switch, PlayStation 4, PlayStation Vita, Xbox One, Windows, iOS, Android	Spike Chunsoft	Spike Chunsoft	
2017	Kamaitachi no Yoru: Rinne Saisei	PlayStation Vita, Windows	5pb. (MAGES.)	Spike Chunsoft	
2017	Fire Pro Wrestling World	Windows, PlayStation 4	Zex Corporation	Spike Chunsoft	
2017	Kenka Bancho Otome: Kanzenmuketsu no My Honey	PlayStation Vita	Spike Chunsoft	Spike Chunsoft	
2017	Etrian Mystery Dungeon 2	Nintendo 3DS	Spike Chunsoft	Atlus	
2018	428: Shibuya Scramble	Microsoft Windows, PlayStation 4	Abstraction Games	Spike Chunsoft	
2018	One Piece Grand Cruise	PlayStation 4, PlayStation VR, Xbox One, Windows	Spike Chunsoft	Bandai Namco Entertainment	
2018	PixelJunk Monsters 2	Microsoft Windows, Nintendo Switch, PlayStation 4	Q-Games	Spike Chunsoft	
2018	Steins;Gate	Windows	Mages	Spike Chunsoft	
2018	Steins;Gate 0	Windows, Nintendo Switch	Mages	Spike Chunsoft	
2018	Zanki Zero: Last Beginning	Windows, PlayStation 4, PlayStation Vita	Spike Chunsoft; Lancarse	Spike Chunsoft	
2019	8-bit ADV Steins;Gate	Nintendo Switch	Mages	Spike Chunsoft	
2019	AI: The Somnium Files	Windows, Nintendo Switch, PlayStation 4, Xbox One	Spike Chunsoft	Spike Chunsoft	
2019	Chaos;Child	Windows	Mages	Spike Chunsoft	
2019	Conception Plus: Maidens of the Twelve Stars	Windows, PlayStation 4	Chime	Spike Chunsoft	
2019	Crystar	Windows, PlayStation 4, PlayStation 5	Gemdrops	Spike Chunsoft	
2019	Jump Force	PlayStation 4, Xbox One, Windows, Nintendo Switch	Spike Chunsoft	Bandai Namco Entertainment	
2019	Kenka Bancho Otome 2nd Rumble!!	PlayStation Vita	Spike Chunsoft	Spike Chunsoft	
2019	Mystery Dungeon: Shiren the Wanderer	iOS, Android	Cyclone Zero	Spike Chunsoft	
2019	Steins;Gate Elite	Windows, Nintendo Switch, PlayStation 4	Mages	Spike Chunsoft	
2019	Steins;Gate: Linear Bounded Phenogram	Windows, PlayStation 4	Mages	Spike Chunsoft	
2019	Steins;Gate: My Darling's Embrace	Windows, Nintendo Switch, PlayStation 4	Mages	Spike Chunsoft	
2019	YU-NO: A Girl Who Chants Love at the Bound of this World	Windows, Nintendo Switch, PlayStation 4	Mages	Spike Chunsoft	
2019	Zanki Zero: Last Beginning	Windows, PlayStation 4	Spike Chunsoft; Lancarse	Spike Chunsoft	
2020	Katana Kami: A Way of the Samurai Story	Windows, Nintendo Switch, PlayStation 4]	Acquire	Spike Chunsoft	
2020	One-Punch Man: A Hero Nobody Knows	Windows, PlayStation 4, Xbox One	Spike Chunsoft	Bandai Namco Entertainment	
2020	Pokémon Mystery Dungeon: Rescue Team DX	Nintendo Switch	Spike Chunsoft	Nintendo; The Pokémon Company	
2020	Robotics;Notes DaSH	Windows, Nintendo Switch, PlayStation 4	Mages	Spike Chunsoft	
2020	Robotics;Notes Elite	Windows, Nintendo Switch, PlayStation 4	Mages	Spike Chunsoft	
2020	Shiren the Wanderer: The Tower of Fortune and the Dice of Fate	Windows, Nintendo Switch	Spike Chunsoft	Spike Chunsoft	
2021	Danganronpa S: Ultimate Summer Camp	Nintendo Switch, Windows, PlayStation 4, iOS, Android	Spike Chunsoft	Spike Chunsoft	
2021	Re:Zero − Starting Life in Another World: The Prophecy of the Throne	Windows, Nintendo Switch, PlayStation 4	Chime	Spike Chunsoft	
2022	AI: The Somnium Files – Nirvana Initiative	Windows, Nintendo Switch, PlayStation 4, Xbox One	Spike Chunsoft	Spike Chunsoft	
2022	Chaos;Head Noah	Windows, Nintendo Switch	Mages; Nitroplus	Spike Chunsoft	
2022	Made in Abyss: Binary Star Falling into Darkness	Windows, Nintendo Switch, PlayStation 4	Chime	Spike Chunsoft	
2023	Anonymous;Code	Windows, Nintendo Switch, PlayStation 4	Mages; Chiyomaru Studio	Spike Chunsoft	
2023	Master Detective Archives: Rain Code	Nintendo Switch, Windows, PlayStation 5, Xbox Series X/S	Spike Chunsoft; Too Kyo Games	Spike Chunsoft	
2023	Bakeru	Windows, Nintendo Switch	Good-Feel	Spike Chunsoft	
2024	Dragon Ball: Sparking! Zero	Windows, PlayStation 5, Xbox Series X/S	Spike Chunsoft	Bandai Namco Entertainment	
2024	Kamaitachi no Yoru ×3	Windows, Nintendo Switch, PlayStation 4	Spike Chunsoft	Spike Chunsoft	
2024	Natsu-Mon: 20th Century Summer Kid	Windows, Nintendo Switch	Toybox, Millenium Kitchen	Spike Chunsoft	
2024	The Quintessential Quintuplets: Five Memories Spent With You	Windows, Nintendo Switch, PlayStation 4	Mages	Spike Chunsoft	
2024	The Quintessential Quintuplets: Memories of a Quintessential Summer	Windows, Nintendo Switch, PlayStation 4	Mages	Spike Chunsoft	
2024	Shiren the Wanderer: The Mystery Dungeon of Serpentcoil Island	Nintendo Switch, Windows, iOS, Android	Spike Chunsoft	WW: Spike Chunsoft; EU: Reef Entertainment	
2025	Kenka Bancho Otome Double Pack	Nintendo Switch	Justdan International	Spike Chunsoft	
2025	Never 7: The End of Infinity	Windows	Mages	Spike Chunsoft	
2025	Ever 17: The Out of Infinity	Windows	Mages	Spike Chunsoft	
2025	No Sleep for Kaname Date – From AI: The Somnium Files	Nintendo Switch, Nintendo Switch 2, Windows, PlayStation 4, PlayStation 5, Xbox Series X/S	Spike Chunsoft	Spike Chunsoft	
2025	Shuten Order	Nintendo Switch, Windows	Neilo; Too Kyo Games	JP: DMM Games; WW: Spike Chunsoft	
2026	Steins;Gate Re:Boot	Nintendo Switch, Nintendo Switch 2, Windows, PlayStation 5, Xbox Series X/S	Mages	JP: Mages WW: Spike Chunsoft	
2027	Danganronpa 2x2	Nintendo Switch, Nintendo Switch 2, Windows, PlayStation 5, Xbox Series X/S	Gemdrops Too Kyo Games Spike Chunsoft	Spike Chunsoft	

==== Published western third-party games in Japan ====
Release date	Title	Platform(s)	Developer(s)	Ref.
2012	Hotline Miami		Dennaton Games	
2012	The Witcher 2: Assassins of Kings		CD Projekt Red	
2012	Kingdoms of Amalur: Reckoning		Big Huge Games	
2012	Darksiders II		Vigil Games	
2013	Dead Island: Riptide		Techland	
2013	Metro: Last Light	PlayStation 3, Xbox 360	4A Games	
2013	Terraria		Re-Logic	
2013	Epic Mickey: Power of Illusion		DreamRift	
2013	Epic Mickey 2: The Power of Two	Wii, Wii U	Junction Point Studios, Blitz Games Studios, Heavy Iron Studios	
2014	Saints Row IV	PlayStation 3, Xbox 360, PlayStation 4, Xbox One	Volition	
2014	Metro Redux	PlayStation 4, Xbox One	4A Games	
2015	CastleStorm		Zen Studios	
2015	Hotline Miami 2: Wrong Number		Dennaton Games, Abstraction Games	
2015	The Witcher 3: Wild Hunt	PlayStation 4, Xbox One, Nintendo Switch, PlayStation 5	CD Projekt Red	
2015	Wasteland 2: Director's Cut	PlayStation 4	inXile Entertainment	
2015	Crypt of the NecroDancer		Brace Yourself Games	
2015	Divinity: Original Sin	PlayStation 4	Larian Studios	
2016	Homefront: The Revolution		Dambuster Studios	
2017	Ark: Survival Evolved	PlayStation 4, Nintendo Switch	Studio Wildcard	
2018	Cities: Skylines	PlayStation 4	Colossal Order	
2019	Metro Exodus	PlayStation 4, Xbox One	4A Games	
2019	Divinity: Original Sin II	PlayStation 4, Nintendo Switch	Larian Studios	
2019	Cadence of Hyrule	Nintendo Switch	Brace Yourself Games	
2020	Indivisible	PlayStation 4, Nintendo Switch	Lab Zero Games	
2020	Cyberpunk 2077	PlayStation 4	CD Projekt Red	
2022	Disco Elysium: The Final Cut	PlayStation 4, Nintendo Switch, PlayStation 5	ZA/UM	
2022	Dying Light 2 Stay Human	PlayStation 4, PlayStation 5	Techland	
2023	Baldur's Gate 3	PlayStation 5	Larian Studios	
2024	Ark: Survival Ascended	PlayStation 5	Studio Wildcard	
