= 4Gamer.net =

Japanese video game website

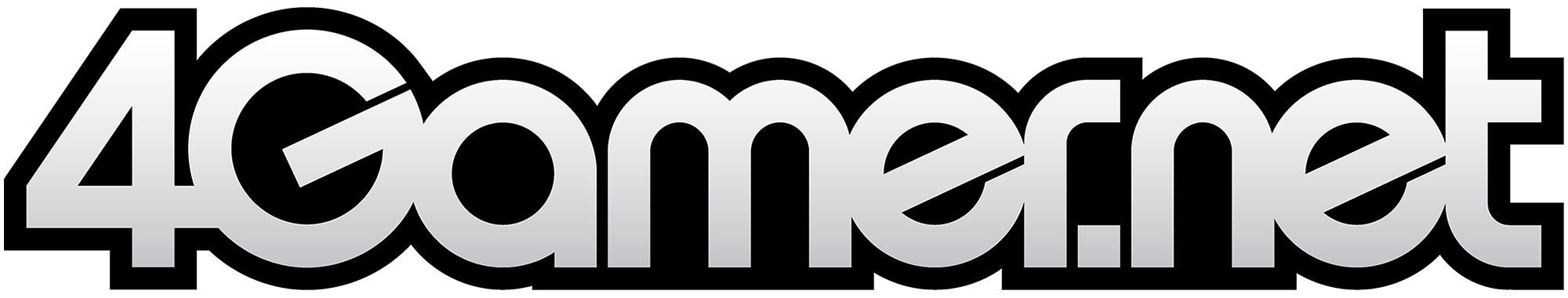
- Website type: Video gaming media
- Available in: Japanese
- Owner: Aetas Inc.
- Website: www.4gamer.net
- Commercial: Yes
- Launched: August 2000
- Current status: Online

4Gamer.net, also commonly referred to as 4Gamer, is a Japanese video gaming media website operated out of Tokyo by Aetas Inc., a subsidiary of Digital Hearts Co., Ltd. It was launched in August 2000 by editor-in-chief Hazukisa Okada. The site publishes articles and reviews for upcoming and newly released video games across platforms such as PC, Xbox, PlayStation, and Nintendo Switch, in addition to conducting exclusive interviews with video game creators. 4Gamer.net also produces a biweekly radio program, RADIO 4Gamer Tap, acting as a media partner to various Japanese gaming events. It has been recognized in both Japanese and western media for its prominence in Japanese gaming coverage.

== Overview ==
The site initially focused on "western games" such as FPS and RTS genres, the video gaming market, along with MMORPGs and dating simulations. Today, 4Gamer.net is a comprehensive video game information site.

== History ==
As an employee of Japanese investment company SoftBank, Hazukisa Okada founded 4Gamer in August 2000 as a personal website alongside two companions. This eventually led to 4Gamer being operated under Movida Holdings, a gaming-focused subsidiary of SoftBank initially known as BB Serve, during the early days of the website.

Beginning in 2010, 4Gamer.net extended its reach past its website audience and turned to radio broadcasting. The weekly video-radio program, RADIO4Gamer, was aired on Bunka Hōsō's internet radio station Chou! A&G+ from April 8, 2010 to January 2, 2015. The radio program was hosted by Nobuhiko Okamoto, Japanese voice actor and singer, alongside game writer and assistant Mafia Kajita. After the radio program concluded, RADIO4GamerTap was created in 2015. This program continued to air biweekly on the same network and was hosted again by Okamoto and Kajita. Its episodes were expanded to YouTube and other streaming platforms.

In 2012, Digital Hearts Holdings, a Japanese quality assurance company known for its work with gaming companies Nintendo and Bandai Namco, acquired Aetas, Inc. for 800 million yen, with the intent of breaking into the gaming media sector while utilizing its direct connections to its existing customer base of gaming companies.

In 2016, deputy editor-in-chief Shinichi Taira departed from 4Gamer to operate his own site called Denfaminico Gamer, which served to consolidate news from 4Gamer and three other popular Japanese gaming media sites (Dengeki Online, Famitsu, and niconico) into a single source.

In September 2022, Nikkei XTrend, a marketing and business strategy publication produced by Nikkei BP, covered a Tokyo Game Show 2022 forum panel on the future of esports, on which Okada appeared as a panelist representing gaming media, alongside representatives from Japan's Ministry of Economy, Trade and Industry, professional gaming, and an industry sponsor.

As of 2026, Okada serves as both the editor-in-chief of the site itself, as well as president and CEO of Aetas, Inc. In April 2026, Aetas, Inc. reported that the site receives 68 million views per month across 5.4 million unique browsers. As of 2026, the site claims to host information on over 98,000 video games.

== Media partnerships and awards ==
As a media partner since 2014, 4Gamer.net has co-organized the annual "TGS Media Award" at the Tokyo Game Show alongside fellow Japanese gaming outlets Famitsu and Dengeki. In later iterations of the TGS Media award, a fourth group known as V Jump ran the award as well. Each of the groups select their own candidates and winners in both "Rookie" and "Indie" game developer categories. Additionally the group held a public poll for users to respond to during the public days of the show. The award is intended to shine a light on new, non-sequel titles and independent game developers presenting at the show. A joint Grand Prize category was added in 2019.

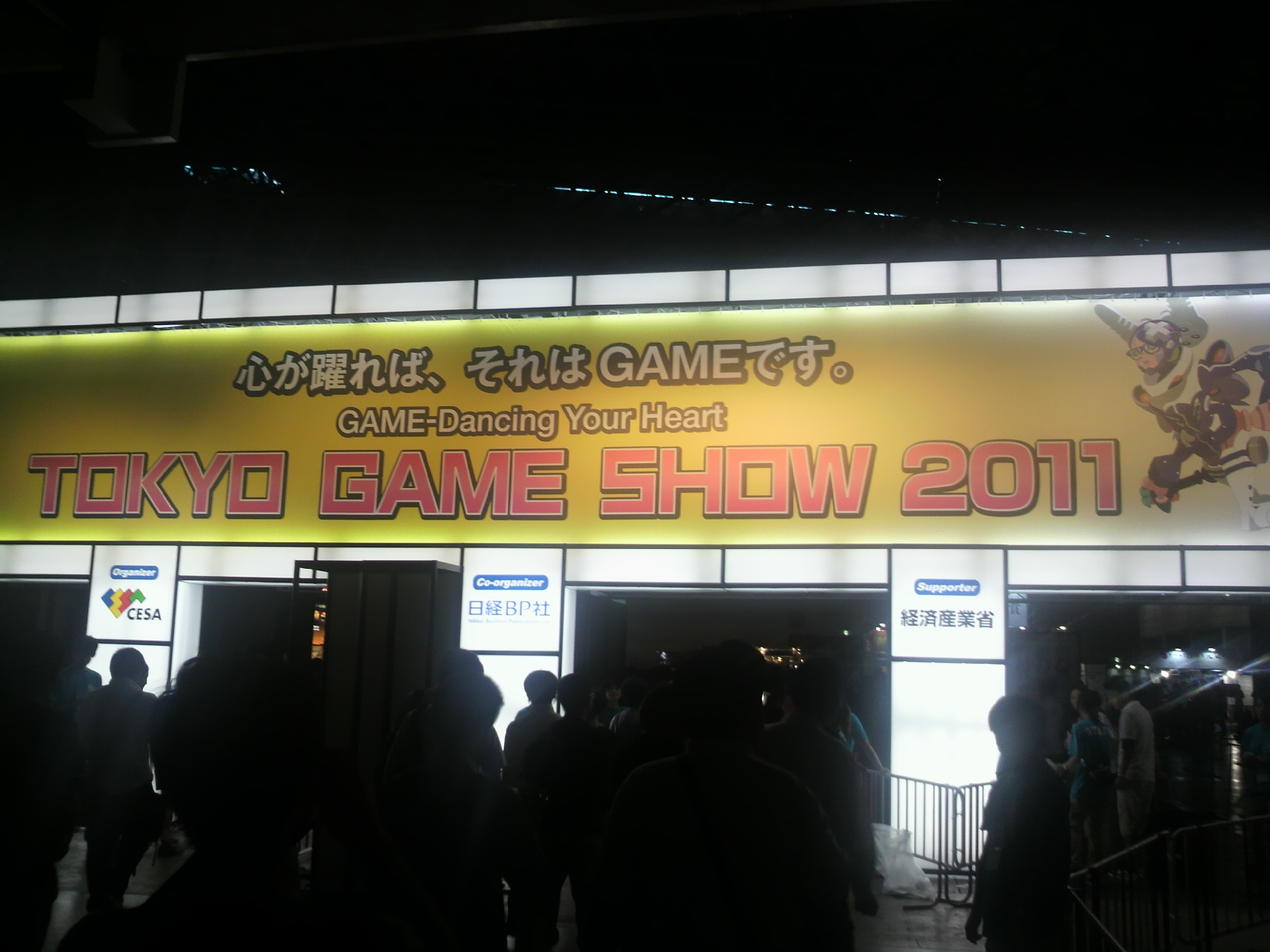
The entrance to Tokyo Game Show, where 4Gamer co-organizes the annual TGS Media Award alongside Famitsu and Dengeki.

4Gamer is also a media partner of BitSummit, an annual indie game festival hosted in Kyoto, where it selects a winner for its own 4Gamer.net Award.

== Recognition ==
4Gamer won its first LINE Media Award for Culture at the 2025 LINE News Awards. In the announcement of the award-winning outlets, LINE News described 4Gamer as "Japan's largest comprehensive gaming information site."

The site has been frequently referenced by Famitsu, as well as Western video game sites including IGN, GameTrailers, Eurogamer and 1Up.com.
