= Pokémon Mystery Dungeon: Rescue Team DX =

2020 remake of Pokémon Red and Blue Rescue Team for the Nintendo Switch

- Home menu icon
- Developer: Spike Chunsoft
- Publishers: JP: The Pokémon Company; WW: Nintendo
- Directors: Shin-ichiro Tomie; Hironori Ishigami
- Producers: Takato Utsunomiya; Kazunori Sugiura; Hitoshi Yamagami
- Designer: Akihiro Kaneko
- Programmer: Takuya Kanai
- Artists: Hiroko Takano; Keisuke Sakurai
- Writer: Shin-ichiro Tomie
- Composer: Keisuke Ito
- Series: Pokémon Mystery Dungeon
- Engine: Unity
- Platform: Nintendo Switch
- Release: March 6, 2020
- Genres: Roguelike, Role-playing
- Mode: Single-player

Pokémon Mystery Dungeon: Rescue Team DX (Note: Japanese: ポケモン不思議のダンジョン 救助隊DX, Hepburn: Pokémon Fushigi no Danjon Kyūjotai DX) is a 2020 roguelike video game developed by Spike Chunsoft and published by Nintendo and The Pokémon Company for the Nintendo Switch. It is part of the Pokémon Mystery Dungeon video game series. It is a remake of the 2005 video games Pokémon Mystery Dungeon: Blue Rescue Team and Red Rescue Team. Announced in January 2020, it was released worldwide on March 6, 2020. The game is the first remake of a Pokémon spin-off game. The game features a new painterly-like art style and includes new additions not seen in the originals such as Mega Evolution, autosave, and auto-mode. As of December 31, 2022, the game has sold 1.99 million copies.

== Gameplay ==
Combat within a mystery dungeon. The map in the upper left of the screen fills out as the player explores the floor. Team stats are in the upper right corner.

The player starts out as a human who turned into a Pokémon, which can be one of sixteen Pokémon from the series' first three generations (Bulbasaur, Charmander, Squirtle, Pikachu, Meowth, Psyduck, Machop, Cubone, Eevee, Chikorita, Cyndaquil, Totodile, Treecko, Torchic, Mudkip, and Skitty). The Pokémon that the player begins as is determined by a personality quiz taken at the start of the game. The player chooses a partner Pokémon from the same list, excluding Pokémon of the same type. The game is mission-based with many jobs, which can be found on the bulletin board, requested by mail, or initiated through story events, and include rescuing Pokémon, delivering items, and escorting clients. If the player successfully completes a job, they receive a reward and Rescue Points, which increase a team's rank.

These jobs take place in dungeons, the layout of which are randomized. The objective is to either finish a job or go through all the floors to find the exit. In the dungeon, there are wild Pokémon that battle with the player's team. These battles are turn-based, and take place in the dungeon map. Pokémon fight with the four moves they know, or by using projectiles and other items. While going through the dungeon, the player gets hungry and must eat food, either found in the dungeon or bought in advance. Pokémon can join the player's team within dungeons and can either permanently stay or be dismissed after the dungeon. Completing missions can also allow a Pokémon to join the player's team.

Unlike the original games, being defeated in a dungeon will only make the player control the next Pokémon in their team, until all three main Pokémon are defeated. The player is able to encounter shiny Pokémon during the game, which only appear as "strong foes".

== Plot ==
The plot is similar to that of the original Rescue Team, with only minor changes in details and dialogues.

Similarly to the rest of the Pokémon Mystery Dungeon series, the game takes place in a world inhabited entirely by talking Pokémon. Some are townsfolk living in society, while others live in dungeons in the wild. The player awakes with amnesia, only remembering they were a human before. This is shocking to other Pokémon, as while they are aware of the existence of a human world, it is supposed to be separate from theirs. The first Pokémon the player meets quickly becomes their friend, and partners with them to create a rescue team, whose goal is to bring assistance to Pokémon in distress in the many dungeons of the world. The need for rescue teams is particularly acute, as the world is facing natural disasters of increasing frequency and intensity.

After starting small, the team soon begins to accomplish rescue missions in earnest. They meet other teams, including a top team led by Alakazam, and another one led by Gengar, with which a rivalry quickly forms. The team also learns of a legend about a human cursed for 1000 years by Ninetales for grabbing one of its tails, and how they let their Gardevoir be cursed instead. Ninetales then prophesied the human would be reborn as a Pokémon, upsetting the natural balance of the world. At around the same time, a Gardevoir starts appearing in the player's dreams. Soon after, the team journeys to fortune-teller Xatu, hoping to get some clarity. Xatu quickly realizes the player was once a human, and while they can tell their transformation is connected to the natural disasters, they are not definitive about the nature of this link. After eavesdropping on the conversation, Gengar proceeds to convince the townsfolk that the player is the human of the legend, and that killing them would return the world to normal. With the player's partner refusing to abandon them, the team is given one night to leave town before other teams start hunting them down. As they are being closely pursued, the team has to go through increasingly remote and difficult dungeons, while witnessing worsening disasters. During the journey they meet Absol, who seeks to find the true cause of the natural disasters and decides to join them. The team is eventually cornered by Alakazam and his team, but is rescued at the last moment by Ninetales, who reveals that the player is not the human of the legend and that their connection to it is a coincidence. However, Ninetales warns the disasters have awakened Groudon, putting the world in great danger.

While the team comes back to town to clear their name, Alakazam's team leaves to try and stop Groudon. After a few days have passed and Alakazam does not return, the town assembles a special team to go rescue them; however, this team is also defeated. Among growing defeatism, the player's team then volunteers to go defeat Groudon. The dungeon faced is more challenging than previous ones, but the team eventually manages to beat Groudon and rescue Alakazam with his team. Celebration in town is short-lived however, as Xatu urgently warns that a meteor, revealed to be the actual cause of the disasters, is approaching and threatens to destroy the world. The only way to stop it is to ask the sky guardian Rayquaza to destroy it. The night before the trip, Gardevoir appears in the player's dreams again. With Gengar listening through his Dream Eater move, she tells of how she still likes the human from the legend that abandoned her, despite his selfishness. At this, Gengar runs away crying. She then tells the player about their purpose in this world, which is to save it from the meteor, and how they agreed to lose their human memories in the process. The next day, Xatu, Alakazam, and Gengar create a Teleport Gem, letting the player’s team go to the sky. After going through its difficult dungeon and defeating Rayquaza, the latter agrees to destroy the meteor. The team reawakens on the ground, surrounded by the town, where they find that the world is safe once again. However, the player must return to being a human and leave the Pokémon world behind. After the credits roll, the player wishes hard to return, and reappears at the rescue team base in Pokémon form, to much shock from everybody else.

== Release ==
The game was announced in a Pokémon Direct on January 9, 2020, and was released worldwide for the Nintendo Switch on March 6, 2020. A free demo was made available on the Nintendo eShop on January 9, 2020; progress in the demo can be transferred to the full game.

== Reception ==
Reception

Aggregate scores
Aggregator	Score
Metacritic	69/100
OpenCritic	39% recommend

Review scores
Publication	Score
4Players	66%
Easy Allies	6/10
Famitsu	35/40
GameRevolution	3/5
GameSpot	8/10
GamesRadar+	3/5
Hardcore Gamer	4/5
IGN	6/10
Jeuxvideo.com	13/20
Nintendo Life	6/10
Nintendo World Report	7/10
USgamer	4/5

The game received "mixed or average" reviews based on seventy-four critic reviews, according to the review aggregator Metacritic. Fellow review aggregator OpenCritic assessed that the game received fair approval, being recommended by 39% of critics. The game was seen as an overall improvement from the original games because of its enhanced art style and updated mechanics from previous entries, but criticized for its repetitive dungeons and the lack of enemy HP bars. Giving the game a score of 6/10, IGN's Travis Northup called it an "unremarkable, grindy experience", while GameSpot's Cian Maher stated the dungeons can "still be a tad annoying at times" and gave it an 8/10.

=== Sales ===
Pokémon Mystery Dungeon: Rescue Team DX was the bestselling game in Japan during its first week of release, with 138,548 physical copies being sold. It placed first in the United Kingdom and France sales charts during the first week. Over 360,000 copies had been sold in Japan and over 890,000 copies overseas, for a total of over 1.26 million copies sold by the end of March 2020. It is ranked among the list of best-selling Nintendo Switch video games. The game was ranked twenty-first in Japan's top 30 best-selling games of 2020 on the Nintendo eShop. As of December 31, 2022, the game has accumulated a grand total of 1.99 million copies according to Computer Entertainment Supplier's Association's White Papers, surpassing Pokémon Mystery Dungeon: Gates to Infinity's lifetime sales.
