= Arata Iiyoshi =

Japanese composer

Arata Iiyoshi 飯吉新
- Also known as: S.S.D.FANTASICA
- Born: Japan
- Genres: Video game music
- Occupations: Composer, arranger, lyricist
- Years active: 2001–present
- Website: ssd-studio.com

Arata Iiyoshi (飯吉 新, Iiyoshi Arata), also known as S.S.D.FANTASICA, is a freelancer composer. He has contributed music as a video game music composer for the Bemani division, but also video games published by Nintendo such as the Super Smash Bros. series, or developed by Chunsoft like the Pokémon crossover of the Mystery Dungeon franchise and the Kamaitachi no Yoru series.

== Biography ==
Iiyoshi is currently working as a sound designer, including composing soundtracks and sound effects.

=== Early life ===
In the past, he was trained at Naomi Career Center in Japan. After graduating, he has worked with other companies, including D-MAC Records, before becoming a freelancer.

== Works ==
=== BEMANI ===
Date	Title	Works	Notes	Ref.
2005	Beatmania IIDX 13: DistorteD	Composer	"BALLAD THE FEATHERS" — with Naomi Koizumi	
2006	Beatmania IIDX 14: Gold	Composer	"花吹雪〜IIDX LIMITED〜" — with ユッコ	
2007	Beatmania IIDX 15: DJ Troopers	Composer	"JOURNEY TO "FANTASICA" (IIDX LIMITED)" — with EMI "Claiomh Solais" — with DJ Yoshitaka	
2007	Pop'n music 15 Adventure	Arranger	"儚きは我が決意"	
2008	Beatmania IIDX 16: Empress	Composer, lyricist	"BRIDAL FESTIVAL !!!" — with ななっち "CaptivAte2～覚醒～" (Lyrics) "I'm Screaming LOVE" (Lyrics)	
2008	Pop'n music 16 Party♪	Arranger	"創聖のアクエリオン"	
2009	Beatmania IIDX 17: Sirius	Lyricist	"コスモス" (Lyrics) "かずあそび" (Lyrics) "NEW SENSATION -もう、あなたしか見えない-" (Lyrics) "NoN-Fiction Story!" (Lyrics)	
2009	Pop'n music 17 The Movie	Lyricist	"プリズム" (Lyrics)	
2010	Beatmania IIDX 18: Resort Anthem	Composer	"BLUST OF WIND" "BROKEN EDEN" "かげぬい ～Ver.BENIBOTAN～"	
2010	Dance Dance Revolution X2	Composer	"羽之谣"	
2010	jubeat knit	Lyricist	"ALL MY HEART -この恋に、わたしの全てを賭ける-" (Lyrics)	
2010	Pop'n music 18 せんごく列伝	Arranger	"怒れる大きな白い馬 ～S.S.D.の役～"	
2010	Pop'n music 19 Tune Street	Lyricist	"～Timeless～" (Lyrics)	
2010	Reflec Beat	Lyricist	"少女小景再抄録 ～影～" (Lyrics) "He is my only star" (Lyrics)	
2011	Beatmania IIDX 19: Lincle	Composer	"A MINSTREL～ver.short-scape～ "ユミル"	
2011	Reflec Beat limelight	Composer, lyricist	"ツキミチヌ" "limelight world" (Lyrics)	
2012	Beatmania IIDX 20: Tricoro	Lyricist	"Re:GENERATION" (Lyrics)	
2012	Reflec Beat colette -Winter-	Composer, lyricist	"ROUND!" "TAKE THE FUN" (Lyrics)	
2014	Reflec Beat groovin'!!	Composer	"待宵草"	
2016	Reflec Beat 悠久のリフレシア	Composer	"アエル"	

=== Video games ===
Date	Title	Works	Notes	Ref.
2004	3rd grade B group Kinpachi sensei Stand on the legendary platform!	Sounds		
2005	Pokémon Mystery Dungeon: Blue Rescue Team and Red Rescue Team	Composer	with Atsuhiro Ishizuna	
2005	Homeland	Sounds		
2006	Sound Novel Portable Kamaitachi no Yoru 2 Special Edition	Composer		
2006	Kamaitachi no Yoru ×3	Composer	with Kojiro Nakashima	
2007	Pokémon Mystery Dungeon: Explorers of Time and Explorers of Darkness	Composer	with Hideki Sakamoto, Keisuke Ito, Ryoma Nakamura, and Kenichi Saito	
2008	Super Smash Bros. Brawl	Composer		(Note: "The Dark World - The Legend of Zelda: A Link to the Past", "White Land - F-Zero", "Skyworld - Kid Icarus".)
2009	Pokémon Mystery Dungeon: Explorers of Sky	Composer	with Hideki Sakamoto, Keisuke Ito, Ken-ichi Saito and Yoshihiro Maeda	
2020	Pokémon Mystery Dungeon: Rescue Team DX	Original Music Composition		
2020	Ninjala	Composer		(Note: "Far East Fighters", "Dancing in the Jewelry", "Spy is Coming!!!".)

=== Albums ===
- FANTASCAPE - Act.1 (2010)
- ETHNOPLEX (2020)
- EXPLORER (2023)
