= Pokémon Mystery Dungeon: Blue Rescue Team and Red Rescue Team =

First pair of entries in the Pokémon Mystery Dungeon spin-off series

Pokémon Mystery Dungeon: Blue Rescue Team Pokémon Mystery Dungeon: Red Rescue Team
- Cover art for Red Rescue Team (left) and Blue Rescue Team (right)
- Developer: Chunsoft
- Publishers: JP: The Pokémon Company; WW: Nintendo
- Director: Seiichiro Nagahata
- Producers: Koichi Nakamura; Hiroaki Tsuru; Atsushi Sugimoto; Kunimi Kawamura; Hitoshi Yamagami
- Designers: Hiroshi Nakamura; Fujimi O-nishi; Yoshihito Takaishi
- Programmer: Masayasu Yamamoto
- Artist: Fuyuhiko Koizumi
- Writers: Shin-ichiro Tomie; Emiko Tanaka
- Composers: Arata Iiyoshi; Atsuhiro Ishizuna
- Series: Pokémon Mystery Dungeon
- Platforms: Game Boy Advance (Red); Nintendo DS (Blue)
- Release: JP: November 17, 2005; NA: September 18, 2006; AU: September 28, 2006; EU: November 10, 2006; KR: August 30, 2007; (Blue Rescue Team)
- Genres: Roguelike, Role-playing

Pokémon Mystery Dungeon: Blue Rescue Team (Note: Known in Japan as Pokémon Fushigi no Dungeon: Ao no Kyūjotai (Japanese: ポケモン不思議のダンジョン 青の救助隊, Hepburn: Pokemon Fushigi no Danjon Ao no Kyūjotai).) and Pokémon Mystery Dungeon: Red Rescue Team (Note: Known in Japan as Pokémon Fushigi no Dungeon: Aka no Kyūjotai (Japanese: ポケモン不思議のダンジョン 赤の救助隊, Hepburn: Pokemon Fushigi no Danjon Aka no Kyūjotai).) are a matched pair of Pokémon video games for the Nintendo DS and Game Boy Advance, respectively. The games were developed by Chunsoft and published by The Pokémon Company and Nintendo. Red Rescue Team was the last Pokémon game released for the Game Boy Advance. The two versions are mostly identical, with Blue Rescue Team taking advantage of the dual-screen features and increased graphical and sound capabilities of the Nintendo DS. The game has six Pokémon exclusive to each version. Mystery Dungeon differs from the mainline games in that the player character is a Pokémon rather than a trainer.

Similar to the other Mystery Dungeon titles, the roguelike gameplay revolves around randomly changing dungeons which need to be explored by the player and their partner Pokémon using turn-based moves. The story focuses on the player who has been turned into a Pokémon and has developed amnesia who later joins a rescue team with a partner Pokémon while finding out who they are. As of July 25, 2007, Pokémon Mystery Dungeon: Blue Rescue Team had sold 3.08 million copies worldwide. Two sequels, Pokémon Mystery Dungeon: Explorers of Time and Explorers of Darkness, were released in Japan on September 13, 2007, and in North America on April 20, 2008. They featured Generation IV Pokémon, improved Wi-Fi features, and more touchscreen options.

The games received mixed reviews, with praise for their originality, while their gameplay and visuals were criticized. By 2007, the two games had accumulated lifetime sales of over 5.25 million copies. Red Rescue Team and Blue Rescue Team were released on the European Wii U Virtual Console on February 11, 2016 and on the Japanese Wii U Virtual Console on March 23, 2016. They were released on the North American Wii U Virtual Console on June 23, 2016. Later, Red Rescue Team was re-released for the Nintendo Classics service on August 9, 2024.

An updated remake of the games titled Pokémon Mystery Dungeon: Rescue Team DX was released on March 6, 2020. The remake has mechanics that were introduced in Pokémon Mystery Dungeon: Gates To Infinity, such as moves leveling up by use.

== Gameplay ==
The protagonist Psyduck and two teammates, Pikachu and Ledyba, engage in combat with an enemy Breloom, Doduo, and Vileplume. The battlefield turn-based commands and a map also visible on the bottom screen. More detailed team information occupies the top screen.

The player starts out as a human who turned into a Pokémon, which can be one of sixteen Pokémon (Bulbasaur, Charmander, Squirtle, Pikachu, Chikorita, Cyndaquil, Totodile, Treecko, Torchic, Mudkip, Meowth, Psyduck, Machop, Cubone, Eevee and Skitty) and is determined by a personality quiz taken at the beginning of the game. The player chooses a partner Pokémon between the remaining Pokémon, excluding the last six stated above and the Pokémon of the same type. The game is mission-based with many jobs, which can be found on the bulletin board, requested by mail, or initiated through story events, and include rescuing Pokémon, delivering items, and escorting clients. If the player successfully completes a job, they receive a reward, and Rescue Points, which increase a team's rank.

These jobs take part in dungeons, of which the layout is randomized. The objective is to either finish a job, or go through all the floors to find the exit. In the dungeon, there are wild Pokémon that battle with the player's team. These battles are turn-based, and take place in the dungeon map. Pokémon fight using the four moves they know, by using a standard "A button" attack, or using projectiles and other items. While going through the dungeon, the player gets hungry and has to eat food, either found in the dungeon or bought in advance.

The player will fail if the main character or a client that needs to be escorted is defeated. Before the credits, the player will also fail if the partner is defeated. However, supplementary allies (including the partner, after the credits) can be lost, at which point they will return to the base.

== Plot ==
Similarly to the rest of the Pokémon Mystery Dungeon series, the game takes place in a world inhabited entirely by talking Pokémon. Some are townsfolk living in society, while others live in dungeons in the wild. The player awakes with amnesia, only remembering they were a human before. This is shocking to other Pokémon, as while they are aware of the existence of a human world, it is supposed to be separate from theirs. The first Pokémon the player meets quickly becomes their friend, and partners with them to create a rescue team, whose goal is to bring assistance to Pokémon in distress in the many dungeons of the world. The need for rescue teams is particularly acute, as the world is facing natural disasters of increasing frequency and intensity.

After starting small, the team soon begins to accomplish rescue missions in earnest. They meet other teams, including a top team led by Alakazam, and another one led by Gengar, with which a rivalry quickly forms. The team also learns of a legend about a human cursed for 1000 years by Ninetales for grabbing one of its tails, and how they let their Gardevoir be cursed instead. Ninetales then prophesied the human would be reborn as a Pokémon, upsetting the natural balance of the world. At around the same time, a Gardevoir starts appearing in the player's dreams. Soon after, the team journeys to fortune-teller Xatu, hoping to get some clarity. Xatu quickly realizes the player was once a human, and while they can tell their transformation is connected to the natural disasters, they are not definitive about the nature of this link. After eavesdropping on the conversation, Gengar proceeds to convince the townsfolk that the player is the human of the legend, and that killing them would return the world to normal. With the player's partner refusing to abandon them, the team is given one night to leave town before other teams start hunting them down. As they are being closely pursued, the team has to go through increasingly remote and difficult dungeons, while witnessing worsening disasters. During the journey they meet Absol, who seeks to find the true cause of the natural disasters and decides to join them. The team is eventually cornered by Alakazam and his team, but is rescued at the last moment by Ninetales, who reveals that the player is not the human of the legend and that their connection to it is a coincidence. However, Ninetales warns the disasters have awakened Groudon, putting the world in great danger.

While the team comes back to town to clear their name, Alakazam's team leaves to try and stop Groudon. After a few days have passed and Alakazam does not return, the town assembles a special team to go rescue them; however, this team is also defeated. Among growing defeatism, the player's team then volunteers to go defeat Groudon. The dungeon faced is more challenging than previous ones, but the team eventually manages to beat Groudon and rescue Alakazam with his team. Celebration in town is short-lived however, as Xatu urgently warns that a meteor, revealed to be the actual cause of the disasters, is approaching and threatens to destroy the world. The only way to stop it is to ask the sky guardian Rayquaza to destroy it. The night before the trip, Gardevoir appears in the player's dreams again. With Gengar listening through his Dream Eater move, she tells of how she still likes the human from the legend that abandoned her, despite his selfishness. At this, Gengar runs away crying. She then tells the player about their purpose in this world, which is to save it from the meteor, and how they agreed to lose their human memories in the process. The next day, Xatu, Alakazam, and Gengar create a Teleport Gem, letting the player’s team go to the sky. After going through its difficult dungeon and defeating Rayquaza, the latter agrees to destroy the meteor. The team reawakens on the ground, surrounded by the town, where they find that the world is safe once again. However, the player must return to being a human and leave the Pokémon world behind. After the credits roll, the player wishes hard to return, and reappears at the rescue team base in Pokémon form, to much shock from everybody else.

== Development ==
Prior to this game, Chunsoft's products were considered mediocre, even if few games showed signs of recovery such as Torneko's Great Adventure 3 Advance: Mystery Dungeon and 3-Nen B-Gumi Kinpachi Sensei: Densetsu no Kyoudan ni Tate! in 2004. During the development of Rescue Team, Kouji Malta, one of the programmers for these two games, and contributed previously on EarthBound and Shiren the Wanderer 2, stated the company went through bad business performance, as employees from Chunsoft would leave the company progressively.

First revealed in August 2005, the Japanese release date was announced in September. More details were released later that month, showing information about the gameplay and plot. At E3 2006, Nintendo announced the English release of the games and revealed the release date later that month.

=== Technical issue ===
In November 2005, Nintendo announced a bug in the Blue Rescue Team version involving its connectivity with its GBA counterpart, Red Rescue Team, which would erase the save file of any other Game Boy Advance game besides Red Rescue Team that was loaded into the system. Nintendo quickly patched the bug upon discovering it and issued a new shipment of replacement DS cards with the patch on December 8.

== Reception ==
Reception

Aggregate score
Aggregator	Score
Metacritic	62/100 (DS); 67/100 (GBA)

Review scores
Publication	Score
1Up.com	A−
Electronic Gaming Monthly	7.2/10
Eurogamer	7/10
Famitsu	35/40
Game Informer	3/10
GamePro	5/10
GameRevolution	D−
GameSpot	5.2/10
GameSpy	4/5
GamesRadar+	3/5
IGN	6.5/10
Nintendo Life	6/10
Nintendo Power	80%
Official Nintendo Magazine	7/10
PALGN	6/10
Pocket Gamer	2.5/5
RPGFan	70/100
VideoGamer.com	7/10

Rescue Team has received mixed or average reviews on both hardware. IGN rated the game a "Passable" 6.5, feeling that the DS version could have been better if it did not have to be made for Game Boy Advance. They stated, "For a game that encourages team play, it's amazing that Chunsoft missed the boat when it comes to exploring dungeons and finishing missions with a friend". The game has been criticized for its visuals, with reviewers stating that the DS version does not improve graphically on the GBA version. GameSpot gave it a 5.2, stating, "No matter how much you claim to love Pokémon, you should probably skip Pokémon Mystery Dungeon", further stating, "Chunsoft's dungeon hack game wasn't that good to begin with, and the injection of Pokémon elements hasn't done a thing to change that". 1UP gave the games an A−, saying, "you may realize the game isn't 'perfect,' but somehow it's addictive". GameSpy gave it a 4/5, stating, "It may confuse some and frustrate others, but its addictive nature should keep you hooked until you learn to appreciate the art of the dungeon crawl". Nintendo Power gave the game an 80/100, saying, "Mystery Dungeon is not perfect, but its robust and original aspects form a game more solid than many expected". Electronic Gaming Monthly gave the game a 7.2/10, stating, "storing and retrieving items is too much of a hassle"; they also did not like that when the player faints, they lose all of their valuable items.

Despite the mixed reception, the Academy of Interactive Arts & Sciences nominated Pokémon Mystery Dungeon for "Children's Game of the Year" at the 10th Annual Interactive Achievement Awards.

By the end of 2006, Pokémon Mystery Dungeon: Blue Rescue Team had sold over 761,000 copies in Japan, while Red Rescue Team had sold just over 715,000 copies. As of July 25, 2007, Blue Rescue Team has sold 3.08 million copies worldwide while Red Rescue Team sold 2.20 million copies by March 31. The game's success not only helped giving more popularity in the Mystery Dungeon franchise, it also helped Chunsoft from avoiding bankruptcy.

== Sequels ==
Pokémon Mystery Dungeon: Explorers of Time (Note: Japanese: ポケモン不思議のダンジョン 時の探検隊, Hepburn: Pokémon Fushigi no Danjon Toki no Tankentai; lit. Pokémon Mystery Dungeon: Time Exploration Team) and Pokémon Mystery Dungeon: Explorers of Darkness (Note: Japanese: ポケモン不思議のダンジョン 闇の探検隊, Hepburn: Pokémon Fushigi no Danjon Yami no Tankentai; lit. Pokémon Mystery Dungeon: Darkness Exploration Team) are a matched pair of Pokémon games for the Nintendo DS. The two games were released in Japan on September 13, 2007, and in North America on April 20, 2008. New features include the addition of Generation IV Pokémon, improved Wi-Fi features, and more touchscreen options.

== See also ==
- Pokémon Mystery Dungeon: Ginji's Rescue Team (the manga serial based on the games)
