= Pokémon Super Mystery Dungeon =

2015 video game

- North American cover art
- Developer: Spike Chunsoft
- Publishers: JP: The Pokémon Company; WW: Nintendo
- Directors: Seiichiro Nagahata; Hironori Ishigami
- Producers: Koichi Nakamura; Takato Utsunomiya; Kunimi Kawamura; Hitoshi Yamagami
- Designer: Kunimi Kawamura
- Programmer: Takuya Kanai
- Artist: Motoi Nakamura
- Writer: Shin-ichiro Tomie
- Composers: Keisuke Ito; Yasuhiro Kawagoe; Noriko Murakami
- Series: Pokémon Mystery Dungeon
- Platform: Nintendo 3DS
- Release: JP: September 17, 2015; NA: November 20, 2015; EU: February 19, 2016; AU: February 20, 2016
- Genres: Roguelike, Role-playing
- Mode: Single-player

Pokémon Super Mystery Dungeon (Note: Japanese: ポケモン超不思議のダンジョン, Hepburn: Pokémon Chō Fushigi no Danjon) is a roguelike video game in the Pokémon Mystery Dungeon series developed by Spike Chunsoft and published by The Pokémon Company and Nintendo for the Nintendo 3DS handheld game console. Like its predecessors, players control a human who has awoken as a Pokémon in a world filled entirely by Pokémon and must travel through dungeons, completing missions and battling enemies. The game was released in Japan on September 17, 2015; in North America on November 20, 2015; in Europe on February 19, 2016; and in Australia on February 20, 2016.

== Gameplay ==
Like its predecessor, Super Mystery Dungeon is a dungeon-crawling rogue-like role-playing game featuring 3D characters and environments. Players assume the role of one of 20 Pokémon (which include all 18 starting Pokémon from all six main series generations, along with Pikachu and Riolu), who is joined by a partner, chosen out of the remaining 19 Pokémon, who accompany them in their journey through procedurally-generated dungeons filled with enemies and traps as they help stop a major crisis and save the Pokémon world. The game features all 720 released Pokémon at the time of release.

== Plot ==
The player wakes up transformed into a Pokémon and only remembering that they used to be a human. When they are attacked by a group of Beheeyem, a Nuzleaf helps them escape and gives them shelter in Serene Village. There, they meet their partner, who dreams of joining the Expedition Society but has become the town pariah due to his overeager nature. The partner sympathizes with the player's outsider status and gives them one of his Harmony Scarves. Beheeyem are spotted outside the village, forcing the pair to flee to the Expedition Society headquarters.

Upon arriving, Ampharos inducts them into the Expedition Society. The pair learn that Pokémon have been turned to stone by a malicious entity, including the legendary Pokémon Entei. The Society finds evidence that Krookodile, a local thug, is the culprit. The player, partner, and Nuzleaf follow Krookodile up Revelation Mountain. At the top, the group discovers a sealed spring that can return petrified Pokémon to normal. They learn that Nuzleaf paid Krookodile to go to Revelation Mountain, and that Nuzleaf was the culprit behind the Pokémon turning to stone. Nuzleaf and the legendary Pokémon Yveltal petrify the player, partner, Suicune, and Raikou, destroy the spring.

The player awakens in a world called the Voidlands and is reunited with most of the Society. They discover that the planet's life source, the Tree of Life, was once almost pulled into the sun by the entity, now known as Dark Matter. They are attacked by manifestations of the Voidlands' darkness. Raikou, Entei, and Suicune save the player and partner, but the others are incapacitated. They escape the Voidlands, but the player and partner's allies have to sacrifice themselves.

An escaped Beheeyem tells the player and partner that Dark Matter can possess Pokémon. He leads player and partner to the supposed location of the Tree of Life, but they realize that Nuzleaf, anticipating Beheeyem's betrayal, lied about the Tree's location. Nuzleaf reveals that Beheeyem was responsible for the player's amnesia. Ampharos and Celebi rescue the player and partner, transporting them to the Tree of Life.

Celebi explains that the player might have been summoned once before by Mew and the Harmony Scarves protect their wearers from petrification when near the Tree of Life. Upon reaching the end of the forest, they find the Tree of Life near death. They are confronted by Yveltal, Nuzleaf, and the remaining Beheeyem, whom Dark Matter has corrupted. They petrify the escaped Beheeyem and try to petrify the group as well, but the group are protected by the Harmony Scarves. The group frees them from their brainwashed state, but Dark Matter begins to send the planet toward the sun. With help from Yveltal and the others, the player and partner destroy Dark Matter. The player soon becomes worried that they might be forced to leave the Pokémon world. However, the partner is the reincarnation of Mew and has to leave instead. The partner tells the player to not be upset before departing in a ball of light.

Some time later, the player has returned to working at the Expedition Society, but has lost motivation since their partner left. Ampharos advises the player to seek out a Pokémon named Xatu on the possibility of bringing back their partner. Upon reaching him, Xatu tells the player that Mew is living in a forest. However, the Mew the player finds is nothing like their partner. Initially returning home alone, the player discovers Mew following them and Ampharos brings him on to help the player with work. The player and Mew bond, soothing the player's grief for their partner. However, Mew is kidnapped by an unknown party.

The player finds the kidnappers and discovers they were Nuzleaf and the Beheeyem, having learned of Dark Matter's presence in Mew and intending to destroy Mew before Dark Matter could revive. The player demands that Mew stay, as they can't bear losing another friend. The player's Harmony Scarf glows and revives the partner. Ampharos and Xatu arrive and explain that the partner was inside Mew and the kidnapping was a ruse to bring the partner back. Mew returns home, and the player and partner resume their work.

== Development ==
In April 2015, editors of Famitsu DS+Wii magazine stated that a new Pokémon game would be revealed the following month and that more details would come in a future issue. Pokémon Super Mystery Dungeon was later officially announced by The Pokémon Company and Nintendo via a press release on May 21, confirming the game's release for late 2015 in Japan and North America and early 2016 in Europe. Like previous entries in the Mystery Dungeon subseries, it was developed by Spike Chunsoft. Gameplay footage from the title was first showcased on a Nintendo Direct broadcast on May 31, 2015, along with a final Japanese release date.

== Reception ==
Reception

Aggregate scores
Aggregator	Score
Metacritic	69/100
OpenCritic	23% recommend

Review scores
Publication	Score
Destructoid	9/10
Famitsu	36/40
Game Informer	6.75/10
Nintendo Life	6/10

The Japanese video game magazine Famitsu gave the game a score of 36/40 in their cross review, with the four individual reviewers all giving it a score of 9. It was the highest selling video game in Japan during its debut week, with 151,823 copies sold, and would go on to sell a total of approximately 295,598 copies in the region by the end of 2015. As of March 2016, it has sold approximately of 1.22 million copies worldwide.

Super Mystery Dungeon holds a score of 69/100 from the aggregate review website Metacritic, indicating mixed or average reviews. Reviewers praised the story, new mechanics, and inclusion of all 720 Pokémon, but criticized the repetitiveness of the combat and overall gameplay. Destructoid called it a "solid entry in the Pokémon franchise," commending its "tons of customization options" and "huge roster of potential allies and moves". Game Informer felt that the game was an improvement over previous entries in the Pokémon Mystery Dungeon series, and had a "better, more focused sense of humor", but that it still had issues such as overly-simplistic combat and repetitive gameplay, declaring that it "pales in comparison to the core RPG installments." Mitch Vogel of Nintendo Life similarly found it to be "tedious", elaborating that "Repetition that's present in nearly every aspect makes for a game that can sometimes feel like a chore rather than a form of entertainment". However, the editor ultimately felt that it would be a game for players who don't mind "grinding" recurrent scenarios and battles, stating "if you have the perseverance to stick with it long enough, you'll find that it pays off in the long run."

During the 19th Annual D.I.C.E. Awards, the Academy of Interactive Arts & Sciences nominated Pokémon Super Mystery Dungeon for "Handheld Game of the Year".
