= Haunter (Pokémon) =

Pokémon species

- Pokémon character
- Haunter artwork by Ken Sugimori
- First game: Pokémon Red and Blue
- Designed by: Ken Sugimori (finalized)
- Voiced by: English: Ted Lewis; Casey Mongillo; Japanese: Toshiyuki Morikawa

In-universe information
- Species: Pokémon
- Type: Ghost and Poison

Haunter (/ˈhɔːntər/), known in Japan as Ghost (Japanese: ゴースト, Hepburn: Gōsuto), is a Pokémon species in Nintendo and Game Freak's Pokémon franchise. First introduced in the video games Pokémon Red and Blue, it has since appeared in multiple games including Pokémon Go and the Pokémon Trading Card Game. In media related to the franchise, Haunter has been voiced by various voice actors, including Toshiyuki Morikawa, Ted Lewis, and Casey Mongillo.

Classified as a Ghost- and Poison-type Pokémon, Haunter evolves from Gastly, and can evolve into Gengar when traded to another Pokémon Trainer. Haunter appears as a large, purple floating head with spikes protruding from the sides and back of it, and it has two disembodied hands for limbs. Haunter's mouth is wide and features a long tongue that can induce seizures in a target if it licks them.

Haunter has received a primarily positive response since its introduction, being highlighted for its design and appearance. Its characterization in the manga Pokémon: The Electric Tale of Pikachu has been highlighted for its unique take on the species as well as Ghost-type Pokémon as a whole. Haunter's design has also been compared to Gengar, with several outlets stating their preference for Haunter due to how well it reflected the concept of a ghost, with some of these aspects being lost when it evolves into Gengar.

== Conception and design ==
Haunter is a species of fictional creatures called Pokémon created for the Pokémon media franchise. Developed by Game Freak and published by Nintendo, the Japanese franchise began in 1996 with the video games Pokémon Red and Green for the Game Boy, which were later released in North America as Pokémon Red and Blue in 1998. In these games and their sequels, the player assumes the role of a Trainer whose goal is to capture and use the creatures' special abilities to combat other Pokémon. Some Pokémon can transform into stronger species through a process called evolution via various means, such as exposure to specific items. Each Pokémon has one or two elemental types, which define its advantages and disadvantages when battling other Pokémon. A major goal in each game is to complete the Pokédex, a comprehensive Pokémon encyclopedia, by capturing, evolving, and trading with other Trainers to obtain individuals from all Pokémon species.

Haunter is part of a three-stage evolutionary line in the franchise consisting of Gastly, itself and Gengar. Gastly can evolve into Haunter after it has obtained enough experience, while Haunter evolves into Gengar when traded to another Trainer. When making the games, the design first started as pixel art sprites by the development team, created with a single color identity chosen to work within the Super Game Boy hardware limitations. While conceived as a group effort by multiple developers at Game Freak, once development was complete Sugimori re-drew the species along with the others in his own artstyle in order to give the game a unified look and finalize any design elements, while also trying to maintain the original sprite artist's unique style. Called Ghost in Japan, When the games were localized for English-speaking audiences, Nintendo of America gave the various Pokémon species descriptive names related to their appearance or features as a means to make them more relatable to American children. The species' name was initially changed to Spectre, before later being localized as Haunter.

Classified as a Ghost- and Poison-type Pokémon, Haunter is 5 feet 3 inches (160 cm) tall. It appears as a dark purple levitating head with angled white eyes and a long pink mouth with sharp teeth. Spike protrusions extend from the sides of its head, while its limbs consisted of two disembodied clawed hands that float in front of it. Originally depicted with three fingers and a thumb on each hand, the anime adaptation and later games in the franchise depicted Haunter with only two fingers and a thumb. According to its Pokédex entires, Haunter's primary means of attack is its long tongue, which can induce seizures until the victim dies if it licks them.

== Appearances ==
First introduced in Pokémon Red and Blue, Haunter has since appeared in several subsequent games in the series including Pokémon Diamond and Pearl, Pokémon X and Y, Pokémon Ultra Sun and Ultra Moon, Pokémon: Let's Go, Pikachu! and Let's Go, Eevee!, Pokémon Sword and Shield, Pokémon Legends: Arceus, and Pokémon Scarlet and Violet. Haunter also appears in spinoff titles related to the franchise, including games such as Pokémon Snap and Pokémon Go, and on several cards for the Pokémon Trading Card Game.

In other media, Haunter has also appeared in several episodes of the Pokémon television series, first introduced in the episode The Tower of Terror where protagonist Ash Ketchum befriended it. Ash attempts to challenge another Trainer, Sabrina, with it, but Haunter flees instead. Later, when Ash attempted a rematch, it returned and resorted to making faces and other antics in front of Sabrina, including blowing itself up with a harmless bomb. The result sends her into a laughing fit, disabling her Pokémon and letting Ash win by default. Haunter chooses to remain with her as Ash carries on his way. In the series it is voiced by Toshiyuki Morikawa in Japanese, and in English by Ted Lewis and later Casey Mongillo.

Meanwhile, in manga, a gigantic Haunter called "The Black Fog" was featured in the fourth chapter of the series The Electric Tale of Pikachu, using its abilities to steal the souls of humans and Pokémon alike. Although Ash attempted to capture it, the Black Fog instead self-destructed. It was later revealed the Black Fog had once become accustomed to being worshiped as a god, and chose to die instead of being captured by a human.

== Critical reception ==
Since its debut, Haunter has been well received both in the context of the Pokémon franchise and gaming in general. In a retrospective of Pokémon from Red and Blue by Nintendo Life, Alex Olney called Haunter one of the best ghost designs they had ever seen, further describing it as simple but effective and rated it highly amongst the game's cast. Fellow staff members staff members Jon Cartwright and Zion Grassl agreed, with the later emphasizing the fear generated by its appearance, specifically citing its disembodied hands as a factor. IGN staff editor Jack DeVries felt Haunter was "the real Ghost-Type Pokémon that sticks out in gamer memory" compared to its series counterparts due to its resemblance to common depictions of ghosts.

Other comparisons have been made between it and Gengar in terms of design. In Nintendo Life's aforementioned retrospective, Olney felt that it was a better design than Gengar's "in many ways", with Cartwright stated that Gengar was far less intimidating by comparison. IGN in their "Pokémon of the Day Chick" series of articles also shared these sentiments, stating its design "looks infinitely cooler" than Gengar, feeling that it had built significant loyal fanbase over the years and they further encouraged players to utilize it over its evolved form. James Osborn of Pocket Tactics stated Haunter's "crooked smile, spiky teeth, and detached hands" made it look "genuinely evil", but felt that much of that impact was lost when evolving into Gengar due to its grounded design, adding "We all want our ghost Pokémon to be spooky." Cian Maher in an article for TheGamer meanwhile argued that while he felt Haunter's design was superior, the anime's recurring depiction of the character as a playful prankster also helped set it apart from Gengar and furthermore helped contrast its descriptions within the game's lore.

Perceived horror aspects of Haunter's appearance and abilities have also been a frequent subject of discussion, with author Loredana Lipperini in the book Generazione Pókemon describing the latter as one of the franchise's more intense aspects. Both Zack Zwiezen of Kotaku and Audrey Drake of IGN noted the disparity he implied maliciousness of its character in the game's Pokédex descriptions regarding its lick ability compared its personification in the anime, with Drake still voicing praise for Haunter as "one of the game's most eerily awesome monsters" despite that. Ashley Darrow in the book Death, Culture, & Leisure argued that while elements such as Haunter's Pokédex descriptions offered "little-to-no mechanical purpose" within the game itself, they helped paint that the setting was not sterilized contrary to popular perception due to the contemplations of death they implied.

Carlyle Edmundson of Screen Rant cited Haunter's depiction as the Black Fog as an example of how much the Pokémon manga differed from the anime particularly in regard to its more mature themes, and described the Black Fog's characterization and willingness to die rather than be captured by a trainer serving as a "stark contrast from the goofy, prank-loving Haunter" presented in the anime. Edmundson elaborated further in a later article, describing the Black Fog as a "realistic" take on Ghost-Type Pokémon. He added that while it was still recognizable as Haunter it was also quite different, serving as one of the franchise's scariest interpretations of a Pokémon. He felt the Black Fog not only set expectations how stronger Pokémon would be depicted in the media, but also found it impressive what the manga was able to accomplish despite the limited material they had to work with.
