= Gengar =

Pokémon species

- Pokémon character
- Gengar artwork by Ken Sugimori
- First game: Pokémon Red and Blue (1996)
- Created by: Ken Sugimori
- Designed by: Ken Sugimori; James Turner (Gigantamax)
- Voiced by: English: Ted Lewis; Marc Thompson; Japanese: Kiyonobu Suzuki; Kōichi Sakaguchi; Nobutoshi Canna; Yasuhiro Mamiya

In-universe information
- Species: Pokémon
- Type: Ghost and Poison

Gengar (/ˈɡɛŋɡɑːr/; Japanese: ゲンガー, Hepburn: Gengā) is a Pokémon species in Nintendo and Game Freak's Pokémon media franchise. First introduced in the video games Pokémon Red and Blue, it was created by Ken Sugimori, and has appeared in multiple games including Pokémon GO and the Pokémon Trading Card Game, as well as various merchandise related to the franchise. In Japanese, Gengar has been voiced by multiple actors which include Kiyonobu Suzuki, Kōichi Sakaguchi, Nobutoshi Canna, Yasuhiro Mamiya and Bob Ross. Meanwhile, in English, the species was voiced by Ted Lewis and Marc Thompson.

Gengar was one of the earliest designs conceived for Red and Blue, and was described by Pokémon artist Ken Sugimori as one of his favorites. In the series' canon, it is classified as a Ghost and Poison-type Pokémon. Gengar is a round, ghost-like being that evolves from the Pokémon Gastly and Haunter. Gengar has several alternate forms within the series, such as the in-battle transformations known as Mega Gengar and Gigantamax Gengar. Gengar also appears in the Pokémon anime series, where it is used by series protagonist Ash Ketchum.

Gengar has received a mostly positive response since its debut, primarily for its design, which has been noted for its popularity and iconicity. It has frequently ranked highly in popularity polls for the series, and its design has been highlighted for its impact on the series as a whole.

== Conception and development ==
Gengar's Capsule Monsters concept art. This scene would later be recreated as the intro sequence for Pokémon Red and Blue.

Gengar is a species of fictional creatures called Pokémon created for the Pokémon media franchise. Developed by Game Freak and published by Nintendo, the Japanese franchise began in 1996 with the video games Pokémon Red and Green for the Game Boy, which were later released in North America as Pokémon Red and Blue in 1998. In these games and their sequels, the player assumes the role of a Trainer whose goal is to capture and use the creatures' special abilities to combat other Pokémon. Some Pokémon can transform into stronger species through a process called evolution via various means, such as exposure to specific items. Each Pokémon has one or two elemental types, which define its advantages and disadvantages when battling other Pokémon. A major goal in each game is to complete the Pokédex, a comprehensive Pokémon encyclopedia, by capturing, evolving, and trading with other Trainers to obtain individuals from all Pokémon species.

Created by Ken Sugimori, Gengar was one of the earliest Pokémon designed during the planning stages of Red and Blue, back when the games were intended to be called Capsule Monsters, appearing on early concept art for the game. As work on the game progressed a single color identity was chosen in order to work within the Super Game Boy's hardware limitations, and once development was complete Sugimori re-drew the species along with the others in his own artstyle in order to give the game a unified look and finalize any design elements. Sugimori has described Gengar as his favorite Pokémon due to how simple it is to draw. In another interview stating that while it's designed to be a ghost and a little bit scary, he also saw its character as "funny" and felt it had the necessary elements for a Pokémon, utilizing simple shapes and a "charming" grin he quite liked.

=== Design ===
Standing 4 feet 11 inches (150 cm) tall, Gengar has a round purple body, short arms and legs, two red eyes, and a perpetual toothy grin. Along its back are multiple spikes, ending in a small tail. Gengar's design went through multiple iterations, with its body changed to a solid color, while its teeth were changed from singular fangs to a long solid row of teeth. While the finalized in-game sprites depicted it with a more shaggy appearance, as the series has progressed, its body became smoother and rounder. These spikes were also diminished, while its face became more pronounced. These changes are often attributed to its appearances in the anime influencing its design, giving it a more "chibi" aesthetic. It has a rarer, "shiny" version as well, which features a slightly de-saturated purple instead. Classified as both a Ghost- and Poison-type Pokémon, Gengar is the third and final part of a three-stage evolution line, with the Pokémon Gastly and Haunter in order evolving into Gengar.

In the sequel games Pokémon X and Y, Gengar can temporarily transform into a new form called Mega Gengar. In this form, it becomes significantly larger with his legs embedded into the ground, while its spikes become more pronounced. In addition its arms become longer, with the forearms more pronounced and also embedded into the ground. Lastly, a gold-colored third eye appears upon its forehead. A second form, called Gigantamax Gengar, was added in Pokémon Sword and Shield. Created by then-lead Pokémon designer James Turner, while it retains elements similar to is original design its enlarged body is now partially submerged into the ground with its open mouth having a swirling vortex instead. Meanwhile, its arms are lengthened, and extend from the ground on both sides of it. The shiny variants of both are completely different from the base Gengar's design, making their bodies appear mostly white while their eyes become black.

== Appearances ==
Gengar first appeared in Pokémon Red and Blue. Gengar can be obtained in the games by evolving the Pokémon Gastly into the Pokémon Haunter; Haunter must be traded with another player to evolve it, though in the game Pokémon Legends: Arceus, an item can be used to evolve it instead. Gengar appeared in several sequels, including Pokémon X and Y, where it gains a battle transformation called Mega Gengar, and Pokémon Sword and Shield, where it gains a battle transformation called Gigantamax Gengar as part of the Dynamax mechanic.

Gengar has appeared in several spin-off games. In Pokémon Mystery Dungeon: Red Rescue Team and Blue Rescue Team, it is a major antagonist, and the leader of Team Meanies, a rival team to the player character. Gengar spends much of the game causing trouble, even convincing the village to exile the hero, blaming him or her for the natural disasters. It is later revealed that Gengar was a human turned Pokémon, and the cursed human spoken of in the legend of Ninetales that is mentioned in the game. Gengar is also a playable character in Pokkén Tournament and Pokémon Unite. It also appears in other spin-off games such as Pokémon Go and the Pokémon Trading Card Game. A Gengar-themed mini-CD-ROM was released by Mattel Interactive in 2000. Gengar has additionally appeared in the Pokémon anime, most notably as a Pokémon used by series protagonist Ash Ketchum. This Gengar was abandoned by its former trainer, and lurked around the Cerise Institute. Ash befriended it and captured it, and went on to use it throughout Pokémon Journeys: The Series.

== Promotion and reception ==
Frequently used in Halloween-themed promotions related to the franchise, Gengar has been featured on multiple items of Pokémon merchandise and media since their introduction, such as a Squishmallow plush, Gengar-themed chocolate chip Eggo Waffles, and a Gengar-themed bed, produced by Bandai, which utilized the species' extra long tongue and wide mouth as cushioning. Preorders for the bed sold out in less than two hours after its announcement.

Described as "the most famous of the Ghost-type Pokémon" by GamesRadar+, Gengar has been well received, placing 10th on The Pokémon Company's Pokémon of the Year poll which featured all Pokémon from throughout the franchise. In 2023, Centennial Media's The Ultimate Guide to Pokémon noted that after compiling monthly search histories of Google, Yahoo and Microsoft Bing, Gengar was the fifth highest searched Pokémon among internet users with approximately 113,500 average searches per month. The book Pikachu's Global Adventure: The Rise and Fall of Pokémon noted the species was particularly popular with older male children who tend to be drawn to "tough or scary" characters. Cian Maher, writing for USA Today described it as an instantly recognizable symbol of the franchise and "one of those precious few 'mons that is unanimously loved by Nintendo and fans alike".

Robert Grosso of TechRaptor praised their "sinister" design as one of the best of the original Pokémon games, feeling its Cheshire Cat-like grin and red eyes embodied the series more "malign nature". He further called it "simple done right", noting a resemblance to a human shadow and an iconic face, which he felt helped fit what he saw as a doppelgänger design philosophy. He also found that Gengar was "well-designed from every facet of its being". Zack Zwiezen of Kotaku described Gengar as a great design, elaborating "It's simple, yet not boring or generic. Gengar is one of my favorite gen 1 designs". He further noted however that while he appreciated this aspect, its in-game Pokédex descriptions were often extremely unsettling in contrast to their described "prankster" nature, a sentiment reiterated by Alyse Stanley and Jhaan Elker for The Washington Post in their own analysis of the entries in contrast to the franchise's normally upbeat atmosphere. USgamer's Kat Bailey described it as the "Joker of the Pokémon universe: apt to turn on you at any moment", noting while its simplistic design and smile promised mischief, its Pokédex entries hinted at darker intentions. Polygon's Nicole Carpenter, meanwhile, stated that while aspects of the games could be dark, the descriptions given to Gengar left her conflicted with their cute appearance due to their short legs and round body, commenting that she "want[s] to squeeze him and hug him" despite being afraid of him due to his "sinister" smile. The duality of their character has impacted projects such as the film Detective Pikachu, leaning into the "slightly scary" nature presented by their description while also presenting it as mischievous.

Kotaku's Kenneth Shepard noted that while it was not a personal favorite of his, he agreed with the notion that it made an impact on the series, with Gengar serving as the blueprint for Ghost-type Pokémon that would be added later to the franchise. He believed it was among the most iconic Pokémon species in the series. Meanwhile, TheGamer's editor in chief Stacey Henley described it as "wonderfully expressive", arguing that the species was charismatic and had enough personality to be able to be the star of their own standalone game. Citing its portrayal in New Pokémon Snap, where the species was demonstrated with more depth and allowed to play the role of a prankster with their powers, she felt it would be well suited for "the darker, gothic settings" not seen enough in the franchise. She added that while many Pokémon would shine with a proper focus from Nintendo, "few of them have the ingredients lined up as perfectly as Gengar does".
