= Pokémon Mystery Dungeon =

Video game series spin-off from the Pokémon series

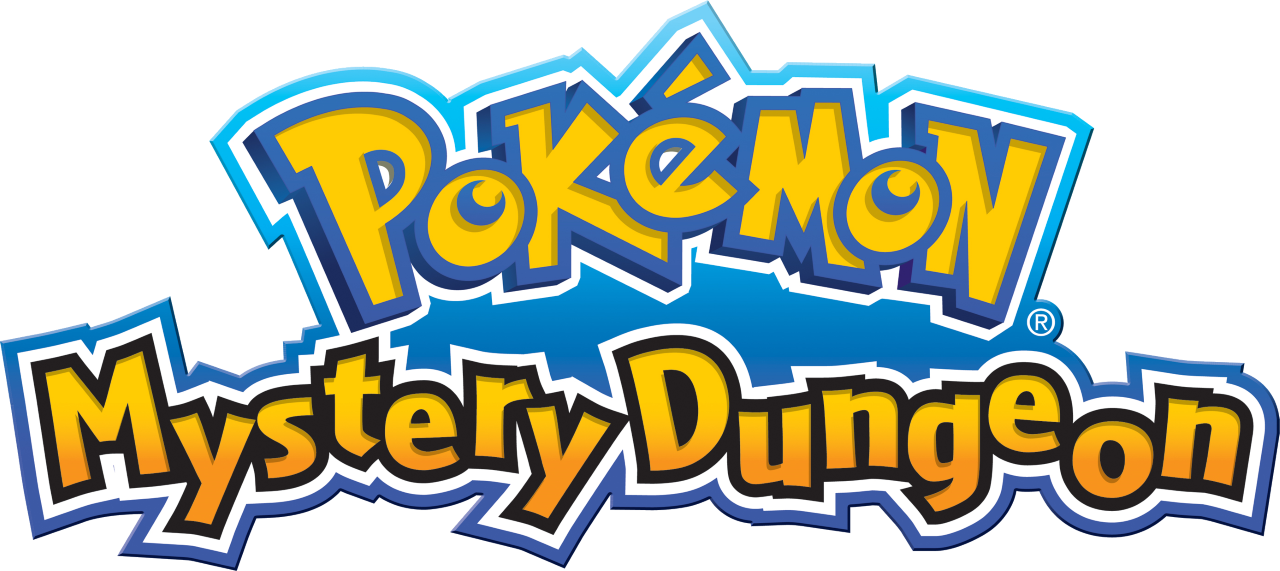
- Logo
- Genres: Roguelike, Role-playing
- Developer: Spike Chunsoft (formerly Chunsoft)
- Publishers: JP: The Pokémon Company; WW: Nintendo
- Creators: Koichi Nakamura; Seiichiro Nagahata
- Writers: Shin-ichiro Tomie; Emiko Tanaka
- Composers: Keisuke Ito; Arata Iiyoshi
- Platforms: Game Boy Advance; Nintendo DS; WiiWare; Nintendo 3DS; Nintendo Switch
- First release: Pokémon Mystery Dungeon: Blue Rescue Team and Red Rescue Team; November 17, 2005
- Latest release: Pokémon Mystery Dungeon: Rescue Team DX; March 6, 2020
- Parent series: Pokémon; Mystery Dungeon

Pokémon Mystery Dungeon (Note: Japanese: ポケモン不思議(ふしぎ)のダンジョン, Hepburn: Pokemon Fushigi no Danjon) is a spin-off video game series from the main Pokémon series developed by Chunsoft. The games feature the fictional creatures called Pokémon who have the ability to speak human language navigating through a randomly generated dungeon using turn-based moves, common to Mystery Dungeon games. As of March 2020, there have been eleven games across five platforms, as well as several manga adaptations and animated specials.

These games are based in dungeons (“mystery dungeons”) where a floor map is randomly generated. In the dungeons, players fight other Pokémon while obtaining items and finding stairs to the next floor, exiting the dungeon after a fixed number of floors. Across all installments, the series has sold over 17.26 million copies. (Note: 5.85 million copies sold from the Rescue Team titles, 6.37 million copies sold from the Explorers titles, 1.38 million copies sold from Gates to Infinity, 1.67 million copies sold from Super Mystery Dungeon, and 1.99 million copies sold from Rescue Team DX.)

== Gameplay ==
Although there are different features in each of the titles, the major aspects of gameplay in each title are the same. It is also generally seen as an easier edition of the other Mystery Dungeon games.

The player assumes the role of a Pokémon that was transformed from a human, found by the player's Pokémon partner in the start of the game. Before the game starts, the player will need to go through a personality test; this will decide which Pokémon the player is in the game with the exception of the WiiWare games and Pokémon Mystery Dungeon: Gates to Infinity, where the player may choose their starter. In Pokémon Super Mystery Dungeon and Pokémon Mystery Dungeon: Rescue Team DX, one can choose a Pokemon to be after the personality test.

Gameplay is based on a classic roguelike game, with the player navigating the randomly generated dungeon with their Pokémon team. Movement and actions are turn-based; the player can use basic attacks, Pokémon moves, and items. The game starts with one partner Pokémon, but the player can recruit other Pokémon that they meet in the dungeon into their team soon after the first mission.

== Development ==
Tsunekazu Ishihara has worked previously with Chunsoft. One of the company's work was Tetris 2 + BomBliss, where Ishihara was the game's producer and met Koichi Nakamura, who was the game's director. Prior to the development of Pokémon Mystery Dungeon: Red Rescue Team and Blue Rescue Team, Ishihara had played a few games from the Mystery Dungeon series, namely Torneko's Great Adventure: Mystery Dungeon, and was impressed with the genre's depth and quality. The game's development started after Seiichiro Nagahata and Shin-ichiro Tomie approached Ishihara and agreed with working on an easier version of the genre for the mainline Pokémon fans.

== Games ==
Release timeline Original releases in green Remakes in yellow
| 2005 | Pokémon Mystery Dungeon: Red and Blue Rescue Team |
2006
| 2007 | Pokémon Mystery Dungeon: Explorers of Time and Darkness |
2008
| 2009 | Pokémon Mystery Dungeon: Explorers of Sky |
| 2009 | Pokémon Mystery Dungeon: Adventure Squad |
2010–2011
| 2012 | Pokémon Mystery Dungeon: Gates to Infinity |
2013–2014
| 2015 | Pokémon Super Mystery Dungeon |
2016–2019
| 2020 | Pokémon Mystery Dungeon: Rescue Team DX |

The games are developed by Spike Chunsoft, formerly Chunsoft before the merging in 2012, and published by Nintendo and The Pokémon Company.

The first game released in the series was Pokémon Mystery Dungeon: Blue Rescue Team and Red Rescue Team in 2005 in Japan, then worldwide in 2006. The duo were released on two separate platforms; Red Rescue Team for Game Boy Advance; Blue Rescue Team for Nintendo DS. A free Korean promotional demo titled "Pokemon Mystery Dungeon: Gold Rescue Team" (Korean: 포켓몬 불가사의 던전 황금 구조대) was later released in 2007 for Windows PCs to promote Blue Rescue Team's South Korean release.

Pokémon Mystery Dungeon: Explorers of Time and Explorers of Darkness for Nintendo DS were then released in 2007 in Japan, then worldwide in 2008. Starting from Pokémon Mystery Dungeon: Explorers of Sky in 2009, the sister game and enhanced remake of Explorers of Time and Darkness, the series would not be released in Taiwan and South Korea. Additionally, due to a production shortage, Explorers of Sky had limited circulation throughout Australia. Most retailers in Australia stocked UK-imported versions.

Shortly after the release of Explorers of Sky in Japan, the Pokémon Mystery Dungeon: Adventure Squad titles were released for the WiiWare exclusively in Japan. As such, they are the first and only Pokémon Mystery Dungeon games to never be released overseas. They were initially revealed as logos on pamphlets given out at McDonald's. These games utilize the 3D models from Pokémon Rumble and My Pokémon Ranch, making them the first games to use models instead of 2D sprites. This was done in an attempt to make "something that resembles a picture book". The three different versions have various differences, like starting points and initial Pokémon choices. They are subtitled Fire Adventure Team, Storm Adventure Team, and Light Adventure Team; the Starter Pokémon available in each version depends on their color (red, blue, and yellow respectively). There is a rescue feature where players can request for friends to revive their team. By using WiiConnect24, new missions are added to the game while the Wii is asleep, and players can share save data throughout all three games. Unlike other Pokémon Mystery Dungeon games, the player controls a normal Pokémon rather than a human turned into a Pokémon. It also features a mechanic called "Pokémon Tower", which allows the player to stack their Pokémon to do a special attack. The player can also use a Nintendo DS as a controller, the handheld's touchscreen allowing them to select Pokémon techniques. All three versions received an unofficial fan translation into English on April 28, 2020.

In 2012, Pokémon Mystery Dungeon: Gates to Infinity was released for the Nintendo 3DS in Japan, before being released worldwide in 2013. From there on, the series use purpose-made 3D models, as opposed to 2D sprites or 3D models from other spin-off titles.

Pokémon Super Mystery Dungeon is the latest non-remake release in the series, released in 2015 on Nintendo 3DS, then in 2016 in PAL regions.

Pokémon Mystery Dungeon: Rescue Team DX is the latest title in the series, released on Nintendo Switch in 2020. It is a remake of the original Rescue Team games on Nintendo DS and Game Boy Advance, united as one game, with a complete overhaul of the graphics and reworked gameplay.

== Other media ==
Manga and animated episodes adaptations of the series were made for each title throughout the years.

=== Animated specials ===
- Pokémon Mystery Dungeon: Team Go-Getters Out Of The Gate! (2006), an anime adaption of Pokémon Mystery Dungeon: Blue Rescue Team and Red Rescue Team.
- Pokémon Mystery Dungeon: Explorers of Time & Darkness (2008), an anime adaption of Pokémon Mystery Dungeon: Explorers of Time and Explorers of Darkness.
- Pokémon Mystery Dungeon: Explorers of Sky Beyond Time & Darkness / Pokémon Mystery Dungeon: Sky Expedition ~The Final Adventure Surpassing Time and Darkness~ (2009), an anime adaption of Pokémon Mystery Dungeon: Explorers of Sky.
- Pokémon Mystery Dungeon Animated Shorts (2015), an anime adaption of Pokémon Mystery Dungeon: Gates to Infinity.

=== Comics ===
- Pokémon Mystery Dungeon: Ginji's Rescue Team, a manga adaptation of Pokémon Mystery Dungeon: Blue Rescue Team and Red Rescue Team.
- Pokémon Mystery Dungeon: Blazing Exploration Team, a manga adaptation of Pokémon Mystery Dungeon: Explorers of Time, Explorers of Darkness, and Explorers of Sky.
- Pokémon Super Mystery Dungeon: Go For It! Novice Investigation Team!, a manga adaptation of Pokémon Super Mystery Dungeon.

== Reception ==
The Pokémon Mystery Dungeon series is regarded as the most popular branch of the wider franchise, with it taking over 70% of Mystery Dungeon sales and having a more active and broader community worldwide thanks to the crossover with the Pokémon franchise.

During the development of Red and Blue Rescue Team, Kouji Malta, one of the programmer for these two games, and contributed previously on EarthBound and Shiren the Wanderer 2: Shiren's Castle and the Oni Invasion, stated the company went through bad business performance, as employees from Chunsoft would leave the company progressively due to this issue. The game's success not only helped to give more popularity to the Mystery Dungeon franchise, it also helped Chunsoft avoid bankruptcy after years of severe financial issues. The series later broke the 10 million copies sold barrier before Explorers of Sky was released.
