= Ninetales =

Pokémon species

- Pokémon character
- First game: Pokémon Red and Blue (1996)
- Created by: Atsuko Nishida
- Designed by: Atsuko Nishida (original); Ken Sugimori (finalized)

In-universe information
- Species: Pokémon
- Type: Fire; Ice and Fairy (Alolan)

Ninetales (/ˈnaɪnteɪlz/), known in Japan as Kyukon (Japanese: キュウコン), is a Pokémon species in Nintendo and Game Freak's Pokémon franchise, and the evolved form of the Pokémon Vulpix. First introduced in the video games Pokémon Red and Blue, it was created by Atsuko Nishida in order to add more cute Pokémon to the series, and it had its design finalized by Ken Sugimori. It is unavailable in Red without trading. Since Ninetales' debut, it has appeared in multiple games including Pokémon Go and the Pokémon Trading Card Game, as well as media related to the franchise, including an episode of the TV series focusing on Ninetales.

Classified as a Fire-type Pokémon, Ninetales is a fox with golden fur and nine tails. A regional variant was added in Pokémon Sun and Moon called Alolan Ninetales, which evolves from Alolan Vulpix, a new variant of Vulpix and Ninetales are introduced with a new "Alolan" form, referring to the region Alola featured in the game. The Alolan forms are Ice type instead of Fire, and Ninetales gains a Fairy type upon evolving from Vulpix.

Both forms of Ninetales have received generally positive reception, with commendation for its usability in gameplay and visual design being commonly cited. It has also been discussed in the context of mythology, particularly fox spirits and the story of Tamamo-no-Mae.

== Conception and development ==
Ninetales is a species of fictional creatures called Pokémon created for the Pokémon media franchise. Developed by Game Freak and published by Nintendo, the Japanese franchise began in 1996 with the video games Pokémon Red and Green for the Game Boy, which were later released in North America as Pokémon Red and Blue in 1998. In these games and their sequels, the player assumes the role of a Trainer whose goal is to capture and use the creatures' special abilities to combat other Pokémon. Some Pokémon can transform into stronger species through a process called evolution via various means, such as exposure to specific items. Each Pokémon has one or two elemental types, which define its advantages and disadvantages when battling other Pokémon. A major goal in each game is to complete the Pokédex, a comprehensive Pokémon encyclopedia, by capturing, evolving, and trading with other Trainers to obtain individuals from all Pokémon species.

When making the games, the design first started as pixel art sprites by the development team, created with a single color identity chosen to work within the Super Game Boy hardware limitations. Modeled after a fox, Ninetales was created by Atsuko Nishida, who had been brought on the development team to help create cute Pokémon for the game. Once development was complete, Ken Sugimori re-drew the species along with the others in his own artstyle in order to give the game a unified look and finalize any design elements, while also trying to maintain the original artist's unique style. Its Japanese name, Kyukon, comes from the Japanese words "kyu" (nine) and "kon" (legend).

Ninetales is a Fire-type Pokémon that evolves from Vulpix, also a Fire type, via use of an object called a "Fire Stone." In addition to using Fire-type attacks, it is also capable of using Ghost and Psychic-type attacks. During the development of sequel titles Pokémon Sun and Moon, "Alolan form" variants of several existing Pokémon were introduced, meant to be tied thematically to the game's region, which was modeled after Hawaii. Both Vulpix and Ninetales receive an Alolan form, losing their Fire type and gaining Ice type. Upon evolving from Vulpix via an "Ice Stone," Ninetales also gains a Fairy type, becoming the only Pokémon to have an Ice/Fairy-type combination. It has slightly higher speed and lower attack than its original variant. Alolan Ninetales' different type and design is explained by its adaption due to the "chilly mountain air" it lives in.

== Appearances ==
Ninetales' Alolan Ice–Fairy design was praised by critics.

First found in Pokémon Red and Blue, Ninetales has since appeared in many other Pokémon titles. It is exclusive to Blue, only obtainable in Red via trading. It can also be found in Pokémon Yellow. It later appears in the remakes of Red and Blue titled FireRed and LeafGreen and the remakes of Yellow tied Let's Go, Pikachu! and Let's Go, Eevee!. A new form of Ninetales, called Alolan Ninetales, appears in Pokémon Sun and Moon. Both forms appear in Pokémon Legends: Arceus. Neither form of Ninetales were included in Pokémon Scarlet and Violet. They were eventually included in the downloadable content The Teal Mask. They were also featured in the mobile game Pokémon Go and the Pokémon Trading Card Game. Outside of the mainline games, it appears in the Pokémon Mystery Dungeon series, including Blue Rescue Team and Red Rescue Team, where it curses a character in the story for pulling on its tails. Ninetales is also instrumental in clearing the protagonist's name in the responsibility for natural disasters that had been occurring. It also appears in the video game New Pokémon Snap. In Pokémon Unite, Alolan Ninetales was added as a playable character, and made available for free for a limited time.

Ninetales appears in the Pokémon TV series, posing as a woman who seeks to convince the character Brock to stay with her at her former master's mansion due to his resemblance to him. Ninetales and its Alolan form have also received multiple pieces of merchandise, including figures, food, and jewelry. Alolan Ninetales in particular was featured in multiple sets of merchandise themed after Pokémon found in snowy regions.

== Critical reception ==
Paste writers Kevin Slackie and Moises Taveras commented on its "magical" aura and "spiritual energy" that they felt made it "equally impressive and somewhat terrifying." They felt it was an especially notable Fire-type Pokémon from the beginning of the series due to its use of Ghost and Psychic-type moves. IGN writer Kristine Steimer also felt that its use of Ghost moves helped set it apart, finding it visually "majestic" and among the original games' best evolutions. As part of their "Pokémon of the Day" series, IGN staff found its design elegant, remarking their dislike for Arcanine by virtue of how they felt that it received special treatment over Ninetales, particularly in the first two generations. They also remarked how Ninetales should have been given Ghost typing due to its use of Ghost-type moves and its ability to curse people. Nintendo Life's staff regarded Ninetales' design as being one of the best of the first generation. While Alex Olney expressed that he enjoyed Vulpix more than Ninetales, fellow reviewers Zion Grassl and Jon Cartwright felt it was superior, with Grassl attributing part of his enjoyment to the Keaton from The Legend of Zelda: Majora's Mask and calling it both "one of the most majestic Pokémon" and "perfect."

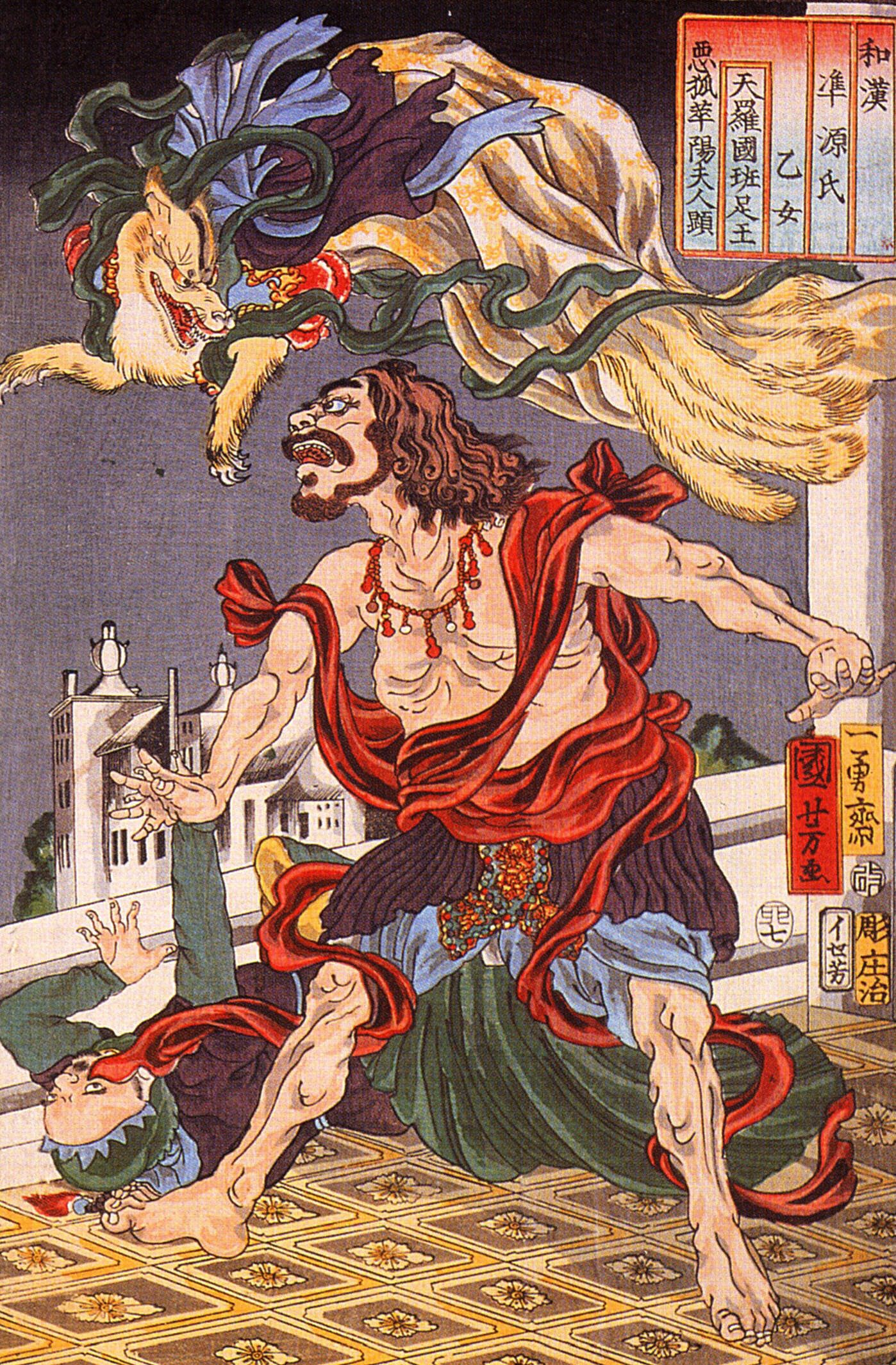
Ninetales is said to take inspiration from the Japanese yokai kitsune

Ninetales' connection to the fox spirit in Chinese and Japanese mythology has been discussed by critics and scholars. A fox spirit was featured in the Marvel Cinematic Universe film Shang-Chi and the Legend of the Ten Rings, which producer Kevin Feige noted caused test audiences to believe that the film featured Ninetales due to their similar designs. The episode where a Ninetales attempts to charm Brock to stay with her was discussed in the book In a Stranger Field: Studies of Art, Audiovisuals and New Technologies in Fantasy, SciFi and Horror Genres, with the authors stating that the story of Tamamo-no-Mae is referenced in this episode. They also discussed how the episode conveys the image of the "practically harmless and even attractive yokai" represents how the "image of that supernatural and incomprehensible being of the Japanese tradition" is being replaced. Author Patrick Drazen also discussed the parallels between Ninetales in this episode and the concept of a "kaidan," Japanese word meaning a ghost story despite not being about a ghost, remarking that it would resonate with Japanese children familiar with the story of Hachiko.

Alolan Ninetales has been generally well received, considered among the best Alolan Pokémon by critics. USA Today writers Cian Maher and Ryan Woodrow praised Ninetales' Alolan design, noting how frequently it appears in "anything Nintendo, Game Freak, or The Pokémon Company ever decide to do." Maher felt that it was one of the series' most popular Pokémon, and expected that this would not change anytime soon. Commenting on its design, they stated that it seemed impossible for Ninetales to "do any wrong," and that it was "still as graceful as ever" in its Alolan redesign and how both forms are "everything a Pokémon should strive to be." Woodrow felt that the original Ninetales design was superior, but felt that it was a successful attempt at a regional form, arguing that it kept what worked about Ninetales and taking it in a different direction by changing the fur color and giving it an "almost magical aura." Alolan Ninetales' usefulness in competitive Pokémon has been commended, with Inverse writer Jessica Famularo believing it fit well on offensive teams. Inside Gamer writer Wes Rijckaert considered it among the best Pokémon introduced in Sun and Moon, appreciating how much more useful it is with its new typing, particularly with how it makes it strong against Dragon-type Pokémon. Destructoid writer Marcel Hoang suggested it was a powerful Pokémon for use in battling, in particular thanks to its Aurora Veil move and Snow Warning ability. Game Revolution writer Bradley Russell found both forms to be great designs, feeling that the original form was from a time that where designers put thought into Pokémon designs. He also enjoyed its mythological roots. Dot Esports writers Ethan Garcia and Alex Tsiaoussidis regarded it as the best Ice-type Pokémon, stating that it was a favorite for all types of fans of the series. They felt that Ninetales had an elegant design, but that Alolan Ninetales was even more so.
