= Pokémon Mystery Dungeon: Gates to Infinity =

2012 video game

- Developer: Spike Chunsoft
- Publishers: JP: The Pokémon Company; WW: Nintendo
- Directors: Seiichiro Nagahata; Hironori Ishigami
- Producers: Koichi Nakamura; Takato Utsunomiya; Kunimi Kawamura; Hitoshi Yamagami
- Artist: Hisashi Nagai
- Writer: Shin-ichiro Tomie
- Composers: Keisuke Ito; Yasuhiro Kawagoe
- Series: Pokémon Mystery Dungeon
- Platform: Nintendo 3DS
- Release: JP: November 23, 2012; NA: March 24, 2013; EU: May 17, 2013; AU: May 18, 2013
- Genres: Roguelike, role-playing

Pokémon Mystery Dungeon: Gates to Infinity (Note: Japanese: ポケモン不思議のダンジョン マグナゲートと∞迷宮, Hepburn: Pokémon Fushigi no Dungeon: Magnagate to Mugendai Meikyū; lit. Pokémon Mystery Dungeon: Magnagate and the Infinite Labyrinth) is a roguelike video game developed by Spike Chunsoft and published by Nintendo and The Pokémon Company for the Nintendo 3DS. It is the ninth installment in the Pokémon Mystery Dungeon series.

Like other Mystery Dungeon games, Gates to Infinity features turn-based combat in a tiled dungeon environment which changes as the player character, a human turned into a Pokémon, progresses from floor to floor. The game received mixed reviews from critics. It was followed up in 2015 by Pokémon Super Mystery Dungeon.

== Gameplay ==
The game heavily features Pokémon from the Unova region, with Pikachu, Oshawott, Tepig, Snivy, and Axew being the starters of the game, with the "personality test" present in the Rescue Team and Explorers installments absent. The game has a 3D art style and makes use of the 3D capabilities of the 3DS. Instead of the usual 2D sprites, the game utilizes more complex 3D models, and also uses the 3DS' camera and sensors for the players to find round objects and turn them into portals. The portals, called Magnagates, hence the title of the game, need to be unlocked and act as gateways to new dungeons. The game's hub area is titled Pokémon Paradise and contains many Pokémon that provide services built by the player. Gates to Infinity also features "augmented reality options"; by scanning objects in the "real world" additional dungeons may be unlocked. The game features both free and paid downloadable content, in the form of additional dungeons.

== Plot ==
Similar to the older Pokémon Mystery Dungeon games, the game starts with the player having a weird dream and waking as a Pokémon. Upon arrival, the player meets a partner Pokémon, who intends to construct a "Pokémon Paradise" near a settlement called Post Town. In the process of doing so, they befriend several Pokémon, including Dunsparce, Emolga, Virizion, Umbreon and Espeon. Later on, the player meets Hydreigon who had featured in the player's dreams. Initially believed to be a villain, Hydreigon reveals himself to be the physical embodiment of the Voice of Life, who brought the player and other humans into the Pokémon world to save it. Kyurem eventually confronts the player, the partner Pokémon and Hydreigon, who destroys Hydreigon and severely wounds the player to stop them from destroying the Bittercold – a presence created by the growing negative emotions of Pokémon which threatens to destroy the world, as he did with other human-turned Pokémon.

Some time later, the group returns to rescue Keldeo who was held captive by Kyurem, and defeats Kyurem and the Bittercold with the support from the Pokémon in Post Town and Paradise. Hydreigon is reconstituted shortly afterwards, and the group celebrates their victory. However, the player is forced to return and vanish from the Pokémon world, to the strong grief of others.

The game then continues, focusing on the partner Pokémon. Hydreigon discovers a way for the player to return, revealing that the partner Pokémon must traverse across a dungeon known as Worldcore to make a wish for the player to return. The partner Pokémon realizes that taking the player from their loved ones would be horribly selfish of them, and instead wishes for the player to be able to freely cross dimensions.

== Reception ==
Reception

Aggregate scores
Aggregator	Score
GameRankings	62.34%
Metacritic	59/100

Review scores
Publication	Score
Destructoid	8/10
Electronic Gaming Monthly	3.5/10
Famitsu	38/40
Game Informer	6.75/10
GameSpot	5/10
GamesRadar+	2.5/5
IGN	4.5/10

Gates to Infinity received mixed reviews. IGN rated the game 4.5/10, stating "Gates to Infinity fails as both a Pokémon and a Mystery Dungeon game, and reaching its meatiest content requires playing through hours and hours of tedium. Its deep supplementary features can't overcome the fact that its moment-to-moment play feels so watered down as to be completely pointless," and summing it up as "bad". GameSpot also reviewed the game negatively, commenting "it's as cute as a button, but dull, simplistic dungeon exploration drags Gates to Infinity into mediocrity," and scored it a 5/10. GamesRadar stated that there are "moments of fun to be had with the game, particularly when the narrative hits its stride, but with little variety in the quests you’ll be taking on, and no real depth to the combat, the experience grows old very quickly, making it a difficult recommendation," and gave the game 2.5 stars out of 5. However, Destructoid gave it an 8/10 score, noting the much easier difficulty compared to previous games and praising the game for its visuals.

The game has sold 374,000 copies in Japan as of January 2013 and 298,000 copies in the United States as of September 2013.
