= List of Enix games =

Video games by publisher

Enix was a Japanese video game publishing company founded in September 1975 by Yasuhiro Fukushima. Initially a tabloid publisher named Eidansha Boshu Service Center, it ventured in 1982 into video game publishing for Japanese home computers such as the PC-8800 series, the X1 series, and the FM-7. Enix initially found games to release by holding contests for programming hobbyists and publishing the winners, with the first titles appearing in February 1983. Enix continued to hold contests and publish the winners through 1993. When Enix moved into traditional publishing for video game consoles in 1985, it began with ports of two of its more successful games, Door Door (1983) and The Portopia Serial Murder Case (1983). From that point onward, Enix served as a publisher for both video games developed independently by other companies as well as for titles in franchises owned by Enix and created by licensed developers. Enix's flagship franchise was the Dragon Quest series of console games, developed primarily by Chunsoft; some of the games, such as Dragon Quest VII (2000), have sold millions of copies, and the series as a whole has sold over 85 million copies as of March 2022.

On April 1, 2003, Enix and Japanese video game developer and publisher Square merged to form Square Enix, with Enix legally absorbing Square. Between 1985 and April 2003, Enix published 95 video games for 56 developers on 12 systems, 65 titles of which were exclusive to Japan. Only one game, King Arthur & the Knights of Justice (1995), was not released in Japan at all, with the remainder appearing in Japan as well as either the North American or PAL regions. Enix served as the Japanese publisher for all of the games released in that region that it was involved in with the exceptions of Paladin's Quest (1992) and Ogre Battle: The March of the Black Queen (1993), where it served solely as the North American publisher.

== Games ==
This list includes retail games published by Enix during its existence under that name after its transition from hobby programming contests to retail publishing in 1985. Only versions of the games that were published by Enix in at least some regions are included; some games have additional ports to other systems that were only published by Square Enix or other publishers. The release dates given are the earliest release of the game by Enix; some games may have been originally published earlier by other publishers in another region.

Key
Symbol	Meaning
Yes	Published by Enix in this region
SE	Published by Square Enix in this region
Other	Published by a company unrelated to Enix in this region
NP	Not published in this region

List of games
Title	System	Release date	Developer(s)	JP	NA	PAL	Ref.
Door Door	Nintendo Entertainment System	July 18, 1985	Chunsoft	Yes	NP	NP	
The Portopia Serial Murder Case	Nintendo Entertainment System	November 29, 1985	Chunsoft	Yes	NP	NP	
Dragon Quest	Nintendo Entertainment System	May 27, 1986	Chunsoft	Yes	Other	NP	
Dragon Quest II	Nintendo Entertainment System	January 26, 1987	Chunsoft	Yes	Yes	NP	
Dragon Quest III	Nintendo Entertainment System	February 10, 1988	Chunsoft	Yes	Yes	NP	
Dragon Quest III	Super Nintendo Entertainment System	December 6, 1996	Heartbeat	Yes	NP	NP	
Dragon Quest III	Game Boy Color	December 8, 2000	Tose	Yes	Yes	NP	
Dragon Quest IV	Nintendo Entertainment System	February 11, 1990	Chunsoft	Yes	Yes	NP	
Dragon Quest IV	PlayStation	November 22, 2001	Heartbeat	Yes	NP	NP	
ActRaiser	Super Nintendo Entertainment System	December 16, 1990	Quintet	Yes	Yes	Yes	
Soul Blazer	Super Nintendo Entertainment System	January 31, 1992	Quintet	Yes	Yes	Yes	
Dragon Quest V	Super Nintendo Entertainment System	September 27, 1992	Chunsoft	Yes	NP	NP	
Dungeon Land	Game Boy	December 15, 1992	Random House	Yes	NP	NP	
Just Breed	Nintendo Entertainment System	December 15, 1992	Random House	Yes	NP	NP	
E.V.O.: Search for Eden	Super Nintendo Entertainment System	December 21, 1992	Almanic	Yes	Yes	NP	
The 7th Saga	Super Nintendo Entertainment System	April 23, 1993	Produce	Yes	Yes	NP	
Ogre Battle: The March of the Black Queen	Super Nintendo Entertainment System	May 15, 1993	Quest Corporation	Other	Yes	NP	
Jyutei Senki	Super Nintendo Entertainment System	August 27, 1993	Tam Tam	Yes	NP	NP	
Paladin's Quest	Super Nintendo Entertainment System	October 1993	Copya System	Other	Yes	NP	
ActRaiser 2	Super Nintendo Entertainment System	October 29, 1993	Quintet	Yes	Yes	Other	
Illusion of Gaia	Super Nintendo Entertainment System	November 27, 1993	Quintet	Yes	Other	Other	
Dragon Warrior I & II	Super Nintendo Entertainment System	December 18, 1993	Chunsoft	Yes	NP	NP	
Dragon Warrior I & II	Game Boy Color	September 23, 1999	Tose	Yes	Yes	NP	
Brain Lord	Super Nintendo Entertainment System	January 29, 1994	Produce	Yes	Yes	NP	
Itadaki Street 2	Super Nintendo Entertainment System	February 26, 1994	Tomcat System	Yes	NP	NP	
Nankoku Shōnen Papuwa-kun	Super Nintendo Entertainment System	March 25, 1994	Daft	Yes	NP	NP	
Nankoku Shōnen Papuwa-kun	Game Boy	March 25, 1994	Daft	Yes	NP	NP	
Robotrek	Super Nintendo Entertainment System	July 8, 1994	Quintet / Ancient	Yes	Yes	NP	
Wonder Project J	Super Nintendo Entertainment System	December 9, 1994	Almanic	Yes	NP	NP	
Nekketsu Tairiku Burning Heroes	Super Nintendo Entertainment System	March 17, 1995	J-Force	Yes	NP	NP	
Mahoujin GuruGuru	Super Nintendo Entertainment System	April 21, 1995	Tam Tam	Yes	NP	NP	
King Arthur & the Knights of Justice	Super Nintendo Entertainment System	May 25, 1995	Manley & Associates	NP	Yes	NP	
Mystic Ark	Super Nintendo Entertainment System	July 14, 1995	Produce	Yes	NP	NP	
Joushou Mahjong Tenpai	Super Nintendo Entertainment System	September 29, 1995	Game Arts	Yes	NP	NP	
Violinist of Hameln	Super Nintendo Entertainment System	September 29, 1995	Daft	Yes	NP	NP	
Terranigma	Super Nintendo Entertainment System	October 20, 1995	Quintet	Yes	NP	Other	
Dragon Quest VI	Super Nintendo Entertainment System	December 9, 1995	Heartbeat	Yes	NP	NP	
Mahoujin GuruGuru 2	Super Nintendo Entertainment System	April 12, 1996	Tam Tam	Yes	NP	NP	
Dark Half	Super Nintendo Entertainment System	May 31, 1996	Westone Bit Entertainment	Yes	NP	NP	
Star Ocean	Super Nintendo Entertainment System	July 19, 1996	tri-Ace	Yes	NP	NP	
Wonder Project J2	Nintendo 64	November 22, 1996	Givro	Yes	NP	NP	
Mischief Makers	Nintendo 64	June 26, 1997	Treasure	Yes	Other	Other	
Nanatsu Kaze no Shima Monogatari	Sega Saturn	November 27, 1997	Givro	Yes	NP	NP	
Ninpen Manmaru	Sega Saturn	December 18, 1997	Tam Tam	Yes	NP	NP	
Riven	PlayStation	December 23, 1997	Cyan	Yes	Other	Other	
Riven	Sega Saturn	April 9, 1998	Cyan	Yes	Other	Other	
Bust a Groove	PlayStation	January 29, 1998	Metro	Yes	Other	Other	
Nihondaihyō Chiimu no Kantoku ni Narō!	Sega Saturn	June 25, 1998	Sega	Yes	NP	NP	
Eggs of Steel: Charlie's Eggcellent Adventure	PlayStation	July 30, 1998	Rhythm and Hues Studios	Yes	Yes	NP	
Star Ocean: The Second Story	PlayStation	July 30, 1998	tri-Ace	Yes	Other	Other	
Astronōka	PlayStation	August 27, 1998	MuuMuu / System Sacom	Yes	NP	NP	
Itadaki Street: Gorgeous King	PlayStation	September 23, 1998	Tomcat System	Yes	NP	NP	
Dragon Warrior Monsters	Game Boy Color	September 25, 1998	Tose	Yes	Other	Other	
Great Hits	PlayStation	October 29, 1998	Sieg / System Sacom	Yes	NP	NP	
Murder on the Eurasia Express	PlayStation	November 26, 1998	System Sacom	Yes	NP	NP	
Googootrops	PlayStation	January 28, 1999	Produce	Yes	NP	NP	
Tomb Raider III	PlayStation	March 4, 1999	Core Design	Yes	Other	Other	
Mystic Ark: Maboroshi Gekijou	PlayStation	March 18, 1999	Produce	Yes	NP	NP	
Bust a Groove 2	PlayStation	April 15, 1999	Metro	Yes	Yes	NP	
Segare Ijiri	PlayStation	June 3, 1999	Braindog / Nemesys	Yes	NP	NP	
Pop'n Tanks!	PlayStation	July 29, 1999	Symbio Systems	Yes	NP	NP	
Rakugaki Showtime	PlayStation	July 29, 1999	Treasure	Yes	NP	NP	
Torneko: The Last Hope	PlayStation	September 15, 1999	Chunsoft	Yes	Yes	NP	
Torneko: The Last Hope	Game Boy Advance	December 20, 2001	Chunsoft	Yes	NP	NP	
Planet Laika	PlayStation	October 21, 1999	Quintet / Zeque	Yes	NP	NP	
Valkyrie Profile	PlayStation	December 22, 1999	tri-Ace	Yes	Yes	NP	
Kaikan Phrase: Datenshi Kourin	PlayStation	February 24, 2000	Produce	Yes	NP	NP	
Utautau: Seirei Songs	PlayStation	February 24, 2000	Opus	Yes	NP	NP	
Ten Made Jack: Odorokimamenoki Dai Tou Bou!!	PlayStation	March 23, 2000	Exrays	Yes	NP	NP	
Omiai Commando: Bakappuru Nitsukkomiwo	PlayStation	March 30, 2000	Magical Company	Yes	NP	NP	
Ø Story	PlayStation 2	April 27, 2000	General Entertainment	Yes	NP	NP	
Suzuki Bakuhatsu	PlayStation	July 6, 2000	SOL	Yes	NP	NP	
Dragon Quest VII	PlayStation	August 26, 2000	Heartbeat / ArtePiazza	Yes	Yes	NP	
Blade Arts: Tasogare no Miyako R'lyeh	PlayStation	September 28, 2000	Ea	Yes	NP	NP	
Bust a Groove 3/Dance Summit 2001: Bust A Move	PlayStation 2	November 2, 2000	Metro	Yes	NP	NP	
Doki Doki Densetsu: Mahoujin Guruguru	Game Boy Color	November 17, 2000	Tam Tam	Yes	NP	NP	
Command Master	Game Boy Color	November 22, 2000	Brain Dock	Yes	NP	NP	
Orega Kantoku Da! Gekitou Pennant Race	PlayStation 2	November 22, 2000	Tamsoft	Yes	NP	NP	
Dragon Warrior Monsters 2: Cobi's Journey	Game Boy Color	March 15, 2001	Tose	Yes	Yes	NP	
Super Galdelic Hour	PlayStation 2	March 29, 2001	Exrays	Yes	NP	NP	
Dragon Warrior Monsters 2: Tara's Adventure	Game Boy Color	April 12, 2001	Tose	Yes	Yes	NP	
Endonesia	PlayStation 2	May 31, 2001	Vanpool	Yes	NP	NP	
Star Ocean: Blue Sphere	Game Boy Color	June 28, 2001	tri-Ace	Yes	NP	NP	
Cross Gate	Microsoft Windows	July 23, 2001	Dwango	Yes	NP	NP	
Minna de Quest: Nijiiro no Yoru	E-mail	July 23, 2001	Lindwurm	Yes	NP	NP	
The Fear	PlayStation 2	July 26, 2001	Digital Frontier	Yes	NP	NP	
Depth Fantasia	Microsoft Windows	December 6, 2001	Headlock	Yes	NP	NP	
Snap Kid's	Game Boy Advance	January 17, 2002	GameKids	Yes	NP	NP	
Dragon Quest Monsters i	Mobile phones	January 28, 2002	Tose	Yes	NP	NP	
Grandia Xtreme	PlayStation 2	January 31, 2002	Game Arts	Yes	Yes	NP	
Grandia II	PlayStation 2	February 21, 2002	Game Arts / Rocket Studio	Yes	Other	Other	
Chase Chase	Microsoft Windows	February 28, 2002	Hi Corporation / Org Corporation	Yes	NP	NP	
Orega Kantoku Da! Volume 2	PlayStation 2	March 7, 2002	Tamsoft	Yes	NP	NP	
Dramatic Soccer Game: Nippon Daihyou Senshu Ninarou!	PlayStation 2	May 23, 2002	Cavia	Yes	NP	NP	
Dragon Quest Monsters 1+2	PlayStation	May 30, 2002	Tose	Yes	NP	NP	
Zoku Segare Ijiri	PlayStation 2	June 27, 2002	Nemesys	Yes	NP	NP	
Dragon Quest Characters: Torneko no Daibōken 3	PlayStation 2	October 31, 2002	Chunsoft / Matrix Software	Yes	NP	NP	
Samurai Evolution: Oukoku Geist	Game Boy Advance	September 20, 2002	TeaSet	Yes	NP	NP	
Robot Alchemic Drive	PlayStation 2	August 29, 2002	Sandlot	Yes	Yes	NP	
Itadaki Street 3	PlayStation 2	December 22, 2002	Tamsoft / Crea-Tech	Yes	NP	NP	
Star Ocean: Till the End of Time	PlayStation 2	February 27, 2003	tri-Ace	Yes	SE	Other	
Dragon Quest Monsters: Caravan Heart	Game Boy Advance	March 29, 2003	Tose	Yes	NP	NP	
