= Robotrek =

1994 video game

- North American box art
- Developer: Quintet (Note: Sound by Ancient.)
- Publisher: Enix
- Director: Masaya Hashimoto
- Producer: Shinji Futami
- Designer: Reiko Takebayashi
- Programmer: Shigemi Kita
- Writer: Reiko Takebayashi
- Composer: Ayako Yoda
- Platform: Super NES
- Release: JP: July 8, 1994; NA: October 1994
- Genre: Role-playing
- Mode: Single-player

Robotrek, known in Japan as Slapstick (Japanese: スラップスティック, Hepburn: Surappusutikku), is a role-playing video game (RPG) for the Super Nintendo Entertainment System (SNES). It was developed by Quintet and published by Enix in both Japan and North America in 1994. Set on the fictional planet Quintenix, the game puts the player in control of a budding robotics expert who is the son of a famous inventor.

As its Japanese name implies, Robotrek was intended as a humorous game. Designed to appeal to a younger audience, Robotrek's main focus is on allowing the player to raise up to three robots which are built from spare parts that may be found, gained through battles, or generated by the player by means of the game's item combination system.

Robotrek sold poorly and was given mostly average reviews upon its release. The game's combination of traditional RPG mechanics with the ability to build customizable robots and invent items was positively received. Mixed criticism was directed at its graphics, music, and overall presentation. Some sources have noted gameplay similarities between Robotrek and the later released Pokémon and Robopon RPG franchises.

== Gameplay ==
Robotrek has similar gameplay to that of most RPG video games, with the notable exception that the main character is not the combatant; rather, the robots he invents are, making it more similar to Pokémon and Dragon Quest Monsters. The robots are highly customizable, in aspects such as equipment, special attacks, body color and name. The player is allowed to build a maximum of three robots. Unlike many RPGs, the player must invent or create the robots' equipment, use "Program Points" to set the robot's attributes (as opposed to these attributes being set by the game), and program special attacks in a macro-like fashion, although certain commands do special effects instead.

=== Battles ===
A battle encounter

Battles are engaged by contact with the enemy on a map. The player usually attacks first, unless the enemy has caught the player's side or from behind. Battling in the game takes place on a battlefield under a variation of the ATB system, in which the player must wait for a gauge to fill up before acting. Only one robot may fight at any time up against at most three enemies; the player can switch between robots at the cost of a turn (like in Pokémon). During the player's turn, none of the enemies will act, and the robot is free to move around the battlefield and attack with one of its weapons. After the robot acts, a gauge appears with the letters E (empty) and F (full) at either end. The gauge's depletion will depend on what action the player used. Until the gauge reaches F, all enemies take turns attacking.

Like most RPG video games, the character gains experience points, called here "Megs of Data". Once enough Megs are obtained, the player gains a level. Also all enemies do not give money by default, but certain enemies do drop it on the map after being defeated. Most enemies will drop some item or low-level equipment, but these can be "Recycled" to make money.

This battling system also uses bonuses. The player can earn extra Megs of Data by defeating enemies within a time limit and using melee attacks. Bonus capsules are also scattered around for the duration of the time limit that can contain items or traps.

=== Inventing ===
Much of the game revolves around creating and combining items for the robots' benefit, and is essential to make higher-level equipment. The player creates and combines items using an invention machine. More items can be created by finding the "Inventor's Friends" series which can only be accessed depending on the character's level. Aiding the combination process are items called Scrap, these allow the player to create basic equipment or make more powerful ones. Weapons can also be strengthened by combining one weapon with the same type (swords for a Sword). A weapon can increase strength by nine times (called levels). The different Scraps that the protagonist can find, are: Scrap 1, Scrap 2, Scrap 3, Scrap 4, Scrap 5, Scrap 6, Scrap 7, Scrap 8, Scrap 9, Scrap 10, Scrap A and Scrap B. Scrap 9 and Scrap 10 when combined with some equipment or other scrap result the most powerful weapons in the game. Some inventions, equipment and scraps are not compatible.

== Plot ==
On the planet of Quintenix (Paradise Star in Japanese), where the situation has long been peaceful, a group calling themselves "The Hackers", headed by Blackmore, suddenly starts an uprising against the population by disrupting the peace of the town of Rococo (and elsewhere). The main character (who appears to be nameless) is the son of a famous inventor, Dr. Akihabara, who decides to move to Rococo. The main character soon sets off to find out that The Hackers want Dr. Akihabara for a sinister purpose, as Akihabara refuses an offer to join them. The story unfolds to the point where The Hackers' ultimate goal is the Tetron, a mysterious stone that allows viewers to observe events past and future and travel through time.

The Tetron is later found out to be an invention of the main character's ancestor Rask (Rusk) and one of his friends, Gateau, finds the Tetron's potential as the key to controlling the universe by controlling time. Rask disregards that potential and hides the Tetron in shards throughout Quintenix. Gateau, who — presumedly — formed The Hackers later on, obtains the Tetron and attempts to proceed with his plan for universal domination, starting with Rask's home planet of Choco (Chocolate Star in Japanese). It is up to the main character to stop Gateau in his space fortress.

== Development and release ==
Robotrek was developed by Quintet and published by Enix. Ancient handled the game's audio. Quintet had previously developed the ActRaiser series, Soul Blazer, and Illusion of Gaia, all released by Enix on the SNES. Quintet first collaborated with Ancient on ActRaiser 2. Robotrek was directed by Quintet president Masaya Hashimoto, who supervised the staff during the project. After assisting on the overseas marketing of ActRaiser, Shinji Futami was promoted to producer for several Quintet games including Robotrek. Reiko Takebayashi served as both the chief designer and scenario writer for Robotrek, while Shigemi Kita was its main programmer. The game's original concept was devised three years prior to its release and actual development took a year and a half.

As the Japanese title Slapstick implies, the game intentionally features a lighthearted, humorous tone and is officially billed as a "comedy RPG." Takebayashi stated that the central theme of robots and their inventor stemmed from the desire to make a game where the player nurtured their own creation. The original gameplay model consisted of the player inventing robots with different abilities that would aid the citizens of a town in their daily lives. The townspeople would then rate how well they were helped, earning the player experience. An army of villains was added, expanded, and worked into the finalized storyline. Difficulties during development included Takemoto having to come up with compelling ideas for the game's plot and Kita having to rethink and recode the battle system several times. The characters, backgrounds, and enemies in Robotrek were designed by a team of Quintet artists. One artist of note is Kōji Yokota, who was responsible for designing the game's robots and claimed he was tasked with making them appear "retro" or "old fashioned." The soundtrack for Robotrek was composed by Ayako Yoda. Ancient president and lead composer Yuzo Koshiro is credited as a sound producer on the game.

Robotrek was released in Japan on July 8, 1994. According to Famitsu sales data, it was the 11th-best selling game among Japanese retailers during the week of its release and the 21st-best selling game the following week. Enix published a strategy guide as part of its "Challenge Book" series in Japan on August 8, 1994. Robotrek was released in North America in October of the same year. Quintet reported that Robotrek ultimately sold only 45,000 copies in Japan and 20,000 copies in North America. Former Enix America producer Robert Jerauld speculated that the game suffered poor sales due to lack of advertising and an oversaturation of games on the console at the time. Robotrek would be one of the final games released by Enix in the region before taking a hiatus from publishing outside of Japan in late 1995.

== Reception and legacy ==
Reception

Aggregate score
Aggregator	Score
GameRankings	67%

Review scores
Publication	Score
Electronic Gaming Monthly	8/10, 8/10, 7/10, 7/10, 7/10
Famitsu	8/10, 7/10, 8/10, 7/10
Game Players	83%
GamePro	13 out of 20
Nintendo Power	3.5 out of 5
Super Play	72%

Robotrek received mostly average review scores from printed media at the time of its release. Reactions to its gameplay were mostly positive. Nick Rox of GameFan, Dean Mortlock of Super Play, and Doug Brumley of Game Players all viewed the ability to invent items and build customizable robots that fight in the protagonist's place as innovative or original. Rox recommended the game as "a totally different and refreshing RPG experience." Mortlock appreciated the ability to invent objects and add new robots as the game's one saving grace. He compared this latter feature to recruiting and maintaining a traditional RPG party, but admitted "at least they're trying to be different." These gameplay attributes, coupled with linear storyline progression, led Brumley to conclude that Robotrek was "a fun choice for players without much RPG experience." However, GamePro negatively assessed that Robotrek "unsuccessfully attempts to push the envelope of its genre," criticizing the inability to send more than one robot into battle at a time and the trial and error involved in creating hybrid weapons and items. The magazine did praise the robots' special attacks and the option to avoid enemy encounters.

Critical reception for the game's visuals, sound, and overall light, humorous presentation have been mixed. Electronic Gaming Monthly's Mike Weigand offered a very brief, positive review of the game but desired "a little harsher tone to the whole thing." Although Rox found the "hyper-cute" music passable, he stated that the "extremely bland graphics" nearly ruined the game. GamePro described the graphics and audio as especially generic for RPGs. Mortlock echoed this sentiment, stating that its "cartoony graphics give the impression of simplicity" and that "the sound's the usual sort of thing." Nintendo Power approved of the spritework but likewise discounted the overworld graphics as "simple" and criticized the English text as roughly translated and nonsensical at times. Brumley alternatively praised Robotrek as having "colorful landscapes and cartoon-style characters," a "wonderful soundtrack," and some "realistic" sound effects.

Online commentary regarding Robotrek has varied. In a Quintet retrospective, 1Up.com editor Todd Ciolek considered Robotrek as one of the developer's few missteps during the SNES era, describing it as an "odd robot-raising RPG" that "few warmed up to." USgamer journalist Jeremy Parish similarly described it as "weird" yet "pretty solid" simply due to Quintet's pedigree up to that point. When writing about the genre's prominence on the SNES, Brett Elston from GamesRadar+ counted Robotrek among a set of strong "second stringers" like The 7th Saga, Paladin's Quest, and Uncharted Waters. A few sources have noted similarities between Robotrek and Pokémon, an RPG franchise launched two years later in 1996. Joe Keiser of Next Generation credited Robotrek as a predecessor to the core gameplay of Pokémon in that the protagonist does not himself fight, but instead sends out robots, which are kept in capsules outside of battle. Staff for both Hardcore Gaming 101 and RPGamer also observed a resemblance in functionality between these capsules and the Poké Balls used in Pokémon. The Verge contributor Nick Statt and Hardcore Gaming 101's Joshua Jankiewicz further suggested that Robotrek may have been the partial inspiration for Robopon, a Pokémon "clone" RPG series originating in 1998 that features customizable robots.
