= Planet Laika =

1999 video game

- Developer(s): Quintet; Zeque
- Publisher(s): Enix
- Director(s): Nakaji Kimura
- Producer(s): Yuu Miyake
- Designer(s): Tomoyoshi Miyazaki
- Programmer(s): Masaya Hashimoto
- Artist(s): Kouki Inoue
- Writer(s): Nakaji Kimura
- Composer(s): Akihiro Juichiya; Takako Ochiai
- Platform(s): PlayStation
- Release: JP: October 21, 1999
- Genre(s): Role-playing
- Mode(s): Single-player

Planet Laika (プラネットライカ), stylized as PLAЛET LДIKД, is a role-playing video game developed by Quintet and Zeque for the PlayStation home game console. The game follows the main character, Laika, through a mission to Mars which forces the player to manipulate Laika's multiple-personality disorder in order to solve puzzles. All the characters in the game have dog heads, a possible reference to the Soviet space dog Laika. The game was only released in Japan.

== Gameplay ==
A major theme of the game is Laika's different personalities, embodied by three different characters, Ernest, Yolanda, and Spacer. By talking to different characters, Laika absorbs their different colored auras and when a specific color has been absorbed enough, Laika can turn into that personality to solve a problem, such as needing Ernest, the strongest, to lift a heavy shutter.

Unlike most RPGs, which feature turn-based battles, Planet Laika's are played out almost like Space Invaders and Pong. The player must bounce around a Mind Core and reflect back the enemies' attacks to inflict damage. There are not a lot of battles in the game and enemies only attack when Laika is in one of the special forms.

== Development ==
Planet Laika was co-developed by Japanese software developers Quintet (famous for ActRaiser, Illusion of Gaia, and Terranigma) and Zeque, known in Japan for the PlayStation cult hit Kowloon's Gate. Zeque was responsible for the concept, design, scenario, and graphics, whereas Quintet handled the programming and sound. Like Kowloon's Gate, Zeque's themes for Planet Laika were good and evil and light and darkness. Some of the characters from both games share names as well.
