= Hatsumei Boy Kanipan =

Japanese anime television series

- Cover of the DVD box set

発明BOYカニパン (Hatsumei Bōi Kanipan)
- Genre: Mecha, comedy, romance
- Anime television series
- Directed by: Hiroshi Ishiodori
- Written by: Ryōta Yamaguchi
- Music by: Toshihiko Sahashi
- Studio: Studio Comet
- Original network: TXN (TV Tokyo)
- Original run: July 3, 1998 – January 29, 1999
- Episodes: 31
- Anime television series

Chō Hatsumei Boy Kanipan
- Directed by: Hiroshi Ishiodori
- Written by: Ryota Yamaguchi
- Music by: Hirokuni Maeyama
- Studio: Studio Comet
- Licensed by: Saban Entertainment
- Original network: TXN (TV Tokyo)
- Original run: February 5, 1999 – June 5, 1999
- Episodes: 21
- Video game

Chō Hatsumei Boy Kanipan Asonde Kid DCDC (Deshideshi)
- Developer: Sega
- Publisher: Sega
- Genre: Digital pet
- Platform: VMU, Dreamcast
- Released: April 22, 1999
- Video game

Chō Hatsumei Boy Kanipan: Bōsō Roboto no Nazo!?
- Developer: Quintet
- Publisher: Sega
- Genre: Creative role-playing
- Platform: Dreamcast
- Released: July 22, 1999
- Video game

Chō Hatsumei Boy Kanipan: Hirameki☆Wonderland
- Developer: Quintet
- Publisher: Taito
- Genre: Creative role-playing
- Platform: PlayStation
- Released: September 30, 1999

Hatsumei Boy Kanipan (発明BOYカニパン, Hatsumei Bōi Kanipan; trans. Inventor Boy Kanipan) is a 1998 Japanese anime television series produced by NAS and TV Tokyo, animated by Studio Comet and sponsored by Sega. The series was inspired by the 1994 SNES game Robotrek, developed by Quintet. It was immediately followed by a second season titled Chō Hatsumei Boy Kanipan (超発明BOYカニパン, Chō Hatsumei Bōi Kanipan; trans. Super Inventor Boy Kanipan). In late 2000, Saban Entertainment licensed the series to air on Fox Kids in September 2001 but it did not air for unknown reasons.

== Plot ==
=== Hatsumei Boy Kanipan ===
In the future, humans and robots coexist peacefully, now living on the technologically advanced artificial planet Planet Sharaku, built by an inventor named Professor Taishi 200 years ago. All inventors are required to have an inventor's license, which has certain levels (C-Level, B-Level, A-Level, and TAISHI-Level) depending on the evaluation of the inventor.

The story revolves around the life of Kanipan, a young boy who dreams of being a world-level inventor. He comes to Monshiro Town with his Interface Robot, Kid, in order to reach the coveted TAISHI-Level inventor's license. Starting as a fledgling C-Level inventor and initially failing quite a bit, he meets a variety of characters on Planet Sharaku on his quest to be the best.

=== Chō Hatsumei Boy Kanipan ===
Five years have passed since the events of the first season, and the citizens' lives on Planet Sharaku have become even wealthier. Kanipan, now a teenager, is still aiming to reach TAISHI-Level status and is currently an A-Level inventor. During the 200th anniversary celebration of Planet Sharaku, a mysterious ship falls from the sky and crashes on a beach. Inside the ship is a girl named Angelica, who has lost her memory except for her name. It is up to Kanipan to help Angelica regain her memory, and in the process he accidentally discovers that his planet is in great danger.

== Characters ==
=== Hatsumei Boy Kanipan ===
Kanipan (カニパン, Kanipan)
Voiced by: Junko Takeuchi (Japanese)
A 10-year-old C-Level inventor. His distinctive feature is the goggles that he wears on his forehead. His dream is to become a world-level inventor and reach the TAISHI-Level inventor's license. The reason for this is because as a child, he had a broken toy repaired by a man who claimed to be an inventor, much to his amazement. He was once promoted to B-Level inventor, but due to his failures, his license was revoked, and he was instead demoted by compassionate measures. Afterwards, he was promoted to B-Level for making a satisfactory invention. In the final episode, Kanipan is recognized for pursuing his dreams and making inventions necessary for the future, and obtains an A-Level license. Despite being only 10 years old, he has incredible ideas and is free to come up with ideas that no one else would have thought of, such as electromagnets, static electricity, condensed water, and lava countermeasures due to oxygen consumption. His catchphrases are "I wonder if something like this could happen?" and "I have an idea!" In the second season, Kanipan is 15 years old, lives with Kid, and makes a living as an IT engineer by repairing and maintaining electrical appliances. During the 200th anniversary celebration of Planet Sharaku, he meets Angelica at the Taishi Festival, and becomes involved in a major incident that threatens the planet. He still has a fondness for robots, and has even been exploited by his enemies. Due to his insensitive personality, he is unaware of Milk's affections and is attracted to Angelica. In the first half of the anime, when Ravioli discovers that Kanipan is living with Ann, he says things like "I have become a man," showing his early adolescence. When he wakes up at her home, he wears a nightshirt for the first half, but in the final episode, he appears half-naked wearing only gray trunks. Although he is invited to Nuts and Kirsch's wedding, he is not told that it was also his own wedding. He finally understands this after being sworn in and kissed by Angelica. Thanks to his success in solving the case, Kanipan obtains his long-awaited TAISHI-Level license and departs the planet with Kid, but Ann, Milk, Igor and Ravioli stow away on his ship.
The inspiration for the character's name (and the other characters being named after food and drinks) came when screenwriter Ryōta Yamaguchi was thinking of a name for the main character when he saw kanipan (かにぱん, lit. crab bread) at a convenience store.
Kid (キッド, Kiddo)
Voiced by: Rie Iwatsubo (Japanese)
Kanipan's Interface Robot. He does not have any special abilities, but can display various abilities with the tune-up parts made by Kanipan. He ends most of his sentences with "deshi" (デシ). In the second season, he lives with Kanipan and considers himself the inventor's caretaker. The pendant device that Angelica took with her when she escaped from the Planetary Management Committee allows him to transfer parts and transform in an instant, saving Kanipan many times.
Milk (ミルク, Miruku)
Voiced by: Kanako Mitsuhashi (Japanese)
A selfish 10-year-old rich girl, whose skill as an inventor is even worse than her lowest rank. She later forcibly applies for her inventor's license, but she is assigned to the newly-established "D-Level" (she insists that she is in the "Deluxe-Level"). In the second season, she is a famous superstar idol on Planet Sharaku. Though she is still selfish and her skills as an inventor are still sub-par, Milk is a more considerate character than in the first season. She actually likes Kanipan, and although he is forced to confess that he likes her, he is already attracted to Angelica. After going through the situation, she acts cheerful until the final episode. She does not seem to care about Ravioli, who has a crush on her. Toward the end, she kisses him herself, and tells him, "I'll continue when I come back."
Igor (イゴール, Igoru)
Voiced by: Masami Iwasaki (Japanese)
Milk's Interface Robot and her personal butler. He is a hard worker due to always being at the mercy of Milk's selfishness. When Milk became an inventor, he became an Interface Robot and was forced to change his name to "Sebastian" (the name was also used in the credits for episode 27), but his name was apparently later changed back. In the second season, he works as Milk's manager when she performs as an idol, and has longer legs.
Ravioli (ラビオリ, Rabiori)
Voiced by: Mio Ikeda (first season), Nanaho Katsuragi (second season)
An inventor boy who lives in Inoshika Town. Ever since he met Kanipan when he visited the Robot Grand Prix, he has become Kanipan's rival. He falls in love with Milk at first sight and tries his best to attract her, but due to his inherent stupidity, his attempts are always in vain. Although his skill as an inventor is as good as that of Kanipan, he lacks an inventor's license. In the second season, Ravioli's personality and voice are completely different from the first season. He looks a little more mature and plays an active role in a position similar to Kid. Since he is officially participating in the Robot Grand Prix, Ravioli seems to have obtained an inventor's license. Even though he knows of Milk's fondness for Kanipan, he kindly watches over her.
BK (BK, BK)
Voiced by: Satoshi Tsuruoka
Ravioli's Interface Robot. He has a huge physique and superhuman strength, and can only say, "Hunga." He does not appear in the second season. Instead, a robot named "BK Mark 2" appears.
Nuts (ナッツ, Nattsu)
Voiced by: Harumi Ikoma (Japanese)
A 20-year-old captain and leader of the Debug Squad, an organization that specializes in countering runaway robots. She has extremely reliable fighting powers, such as being able to stop a runaway robot with her bare hands. She is deeply trusted by her subordinates, and is also an inventor, holding an A-Level license. In the second season, Nuts, now 25 years old, is placed in a position to lead many of her subordinates and command the field in Monshiro Town. She rushes to Planet Sharaku's crisis and saves Kanipan. She marries Kirsch in the final episode, but there is no depiction of her as a romantic partner in the story, and Pochi only mentions that they became friends when Nuts rescued Kirsch, who was lost when the planet's core went out of control.
Pochi (ポチ, Pochi)
Voiced by: Takashi Matsuyama
Nuts' dog-like Interface Robot. He speaks in a bitter Hiroshima dialect, and his way of speaking gives the impression of an outstanding outlook on life. He had been away from Nuts since the time she joined the Debug Squad, but when Nuts was in a pinch on a snowy mountain, he rushed to save her. He is excellent both as a robot and as a debugger, and often helps Kanipan and Nuts to solve cases. In the second season, Pochi is very wise and gives a lot of advice to Kanipan and his friends.
Garamu and Masara (ガラム、マサラ, Garamu, Masara)
Voiced by: Kohei Kowada (Garamu), Eiji Takemoto (Masara)
A duo of debuggers and members of the Debug Squad, who have a habit of recommending detonation. Two debuggers who appear to be the same people as the two characters also appear in episode 10 of the second season, but their names are never mentioned and they are credited as "Members" in the ending theme.
Professor Shu (シュウ博士, Shū Hakase)
Voiced by: Kan Tanaka (Japanese)
Kanipan's retired mentor, who lives with him on Conpei Island (コンペイ島, Konpeitō). In the second season, since Angelica accidentally came into possession of the "memory" that she had thrown away, she is targeted not only by Professor Taishi but also by the Planetary Management Committee. She sends an SOS to entrust the "memory" to Kanipan, but she doesn't make it in time, and flees to Planet Sharaku. After hiding the "memory", Shu is captured by the government.
Chuross (チュロス, Churosu)
Voiced by: Masami Suzuki (Japanese)
A female inventor who lives on Mushimushi Island, a paradise for insect-like robots. Although her Interface Robot is beetle-shaped, it cries, "Tsuku-tsuku-hōshi!" There are many mysteries surrounding her actions, and to put it concretely, her actions are rather "weird".
Professor Pepperoni (ペパロニ博士, Peparoni Hakase)
Voiced by: Kei Mashima (Japanese)
A C-Level inventor. He has not been able to move up in rank for 35 years since he got his inventor's license. He does not make inventions that are useful to people, only making inventions that surprise them or benefit himself, and because he only causes trouble, he is banned from the Inventor Management Committee. He will stop at nothing to obtain a TAISHI-Level license. In a sense, he is a teacher for Kanipan.
Galakutta (ガラクッタ, Garakutta)
Voiced by: Takesada Naitou (Japanese)
Professor Pepperoni's Interface Robot, made of junk.
Namul (ナムル, Namuru)
Voiced by: Hiroki Takahashi (Japanese)
The vice president of Milk's father's company, Elec Company. Due to the trauma that he received from his childhood tutor robot, he has an extreme hatred of robots, and is the ringleader of the runaway robot incident that occurred in Monshiro Town. He tries to wipe out the robots' Friendship Circuits (なかよし回路, Nakayoshi Kairo), but he commits the crime with conviction and has no awareness of his wrongdoing. In the second season, after escaping into space, he discovers the Professor Taishi robot by chance and uses it to execute the Sage's Program, and by abusing the program, he tries to create a human-only planet without robots. However, his plan fails when the new planet is destroyed by Kanipan. He eventually finds a way out in space and leaves Planet Sharaku behind. Hiroki Takahashi also narrates the story and the preview for the next episode, and after Namul appears, the previews are sometimes told from his perspective.
Secretary (秘書, Hisho)
Voiced by: Haruhi Nanao (Japanese)
A female secretary working for Namul. At the beginning, she is a quiet person who does not really stand out, but from the middle of the story onward, she has a much higher presence. She is a cosplay enthusiast.
Garashy (ガラシー, Garashī)
Voiced by: Hitoshi Bifu (Japanese)
A B-Level inventor. Under someone's orders, he attaches a runaway chip to a robot and causes a commotion. He laments that his salary has not increased, and is arrested for causing an undersea tunnel work robot to go out of control.
Maron (マロン, Maron)
Voiced by: Takashi Matsuyama (Japanese)
The president of the major robot manufacturer Elec Company and Milk's father, who dotes on his daughter terribly.
Pasta (パスタ, Pasuta)
Voiced by: Haruhi Nanao (Japanese)
A classmate of Kanipan and Milk. He makes a cameo appearance during the crowd evacuation in episode 15 of the second season.
Naruto (ナルト, Naruto)
Voiced by: Shizuka Okohira (Japanese)
A classmate of Kanipan and Milk. He is a boy who wears glasses, and his catchphrase is "According to my data..." He makes a cameo appearance during the crowd evacuation in episode 15 of the second season.
Tapioca (パスタ, Tapioka)
Voiced by: Yumi Kakazu (Japanese)
A classmate of Kanipan and Milk. She calls Kanipan and Kid by name. Her family runs a bakery and has a robot named Focaccia. She makes a cameo appearance during the crowd evacuation in episode 15 of the second season.
Yakisoba (ヤキソバ, Yakisoba)
Voiced by: Yoshiko Inoue (Japanese)
A classmate of Kanipan and Milk. He has a big appetite, since he is always seen eating food. Yakisoba speaks in the first episode; however, he rarely appears in the following episodes and has no dialogue. Additionally, Yoshiko Inoue had no other experience as a voice actress and was one by trade. He makes a cameo appearance during the crowd evacuation in episode 15 of the second season.
Curry (カレー, Karē)
Voiced by: Eiji Takemoto (Japanese)
The chairman of the Inventor Management Committee. He has the authority to decide whether an inventor should be promoted to a higher license rank. He seems to frequently visit Tapioca's family's bakery.
Guardian (ガーディアン, Gādian)
Voiced by: Kan Tanaka (Japanese)
The manager of the Friendship Circuit Regeneration Factory on Garbage Island, and Professor Taishi's first Interface Robot. He is concerned that there is only a small amount of Kei Liquid left to regenerate the Friendship Circuits. There are very few people on Garbage Island who know about the recycling factory, and it seems that only a few security robots are aware of its appearance.
Kanburi (カンブリ, Kanburi)
Voiced by: Norito Yashima (Japanese)
An A-Level inventor specializing in horse racing robots.
Kanburiyudofu (カンブリユドウフ, Kanburiyudoufu)
Voiced by: Norihisa Mori (Japanese)
A horse racing robot manufactured by Kanburi. He does not have a built-in Friendship Circuit. In order to win the race and "make his flower bloom again", he approaches Kanipan for advice and asks if he can modify it.

=== Chō Hatsumei Boy Kanipan ===
Angelica (アンジェリカ, Anjerika)
Voiced by: Yumi Kakazu (Japanese)
A girl who has a mysterious emblem engraved on her forehead. When she met Kanipan at the Taishi Festival, she lost all her memories except for her name, and after that she starts living in Kanipan's house. He nicknames her "Ann". She gradually regains her memory while being chased by Kirsch and the others. At first, due to her memory loss, she appears naturally absent-minded, but gradually becomes an active person, forcing Kanipan to confess his feelings. In the second half of the anime, Angelica regains her memory, and at the same time her true identity is revealed. She is a robot created by Professor Taishi that resembles his deceased daughter. For 200 years, she was a member of the Planetary Management Committee, which controlled Planet Sharaku from an administrative block beneath it, and the emblem on her forehead was proof of that. She is also one of the final keys to the "Sage's Program", an emergency shutdown program for the artificial planet. The Sage's Program will only be completed when she and her lover, Grand Marnier, have their "memories". However, she rebels against Taishi's sudden appearance and forcefully activates the program, and takes the "memory" necessary to activate the program and escapes to the ground. The shock of the escape pod falling to the ground causes an abnormality in the Memory Circuit, resulting in her memory loss. In the final episode, she uses her body to replace the broken core of Planet Sharaku and fuses with it, but her consciousness is transferred to a new body made by Kanipan using biotechnology, and she attends the wedding ceremony.
Borscht (ボルシチ, Borushichi)
Voiced by: Takashi Matsuyama (Japanese)
Professor Shu's former assistant. In addition to being an excellent inventor, he is also skilled with firearms. While visiting Conpei Island after receiving an SOS from the professor, he runs into Kanipan, who had also rushed there for the same reason. They both mistake each other as the culprits who attacked Shu and confront each other, but the misunderstanding is resolved when Cassis and his friends appear. From then on, he starts cooperating with Kanipan and the others. When he is jealous of the relationships between Kanipan and Angelica and Milk and Ravioli, Nuts tells him that he can go on a date only once, but their relationship does not seem to develop into a romantic relationship.
Kirsch (キルシュ, Kirushu)
Voiced by: Makoto Ueki (Japanese)
Angelica's older brother and a member of the Planetary Management Committee. According to Professor Taishi's recollections, he is a robot created in response to Angelica's request to have an older brother, and when he was injured, a metallic internal structure could be seen protruding from his wound. He comes to the ground chasing Angelica, who has escaped from the management block. Although he is very devoted to his sister, he also has a serious side to him, saying, "I hope for a peaceful resolution," after committing a number of destructive crimes. At first he agrees with the Sage's Program's activation, but eventually begins to question Taishi's forceful methods and becomes an ally of Kanipan and the others. When Planet Sharaku's core goes out of control, he teams up with Kanipan and they act together to resolve the issue, but he loses consciousness due to being unable to withstand the energy emitted by the core. He is separated from Kanipan and the others, but is saved by Nuts. In the final episode, he marries Nuts (their wedding also serves as the wedding of Kanipan and Ann, which is kept a secret from the former).
Cointreau (コアントロー, Koantorō)
Voiced by: Shiho Kikuchi (Japanese)
A robot created to be Angelica's older sister and a member of the Planet Management Committee. Deciding that Kirsch's method won't make it in time, she prioritizes the activation the Sage's Program (Professor Taishi's orders), and tries to cure Angelica, who has lost her memory, in a rough manner, and bring her back to the management block.
Cassis (カシス, Kashisu)
Voiced by: Yumiko Kobayashi (Japanese)
A robot created as Angelica's younger brother and a member of the Planet Management Committee. He hates losing and is ruthless despite his young appearance, even once succeeding in capturing Kanipan and Angelica using the giant rat-shaped robot "G-RAT". Because he is loyal to Professor Taishi, when the Sage's Program is activated and he realizes that he is no longer needed by Taishi, he completely changes from his previous bullish attitude and appears disappointed.
Grand Mariner (グランマニエ, Guran Manie)
Voiced by: Ryō Naitō (Japanese)
A robot created as Angelica's lover and a member of the Planet Management Committee. Originally, he was supposed to be the activation key for the final stage of the Sage's Program together with Angelica, but he was captured by Namul, who stole his "memory" and locked him in a cold sleep device. When he is released from his sleep and reunited with Angelica, he is completely naked. He goes with her to the management block of the new planet in order to revive Planet Sharaku. Although he is damaged by Namul's sabotage, he succeeds in destroying the new planet, but is fatally injured by falling rubble, rendering him unable to accept his honest feelings. He leaves Angelica to tell Kanipan about this, before losing his functionality and dying. Ginjō and Dobrock, who have also stopped functioning, are seen attending Nuts and Kirsch's wedding, but it is unclear whether they were salvaged from the collapsed new planet or are separate individuals.
Ginjō and Dobrock (ギンジョー、ドブロック, Ginjō, Doburokku)
Voiced by: Masami Iwasaki (Ginjō), Eiji Takemoto (Dobrock)
Twin robots created to be Angelica's older brothers and members of the Planet Management Committee. They speak in an otaku tone and usually have their eyes closed with smiles on their faces, but when they corner Kanipan in Professor Shu's research lab, their eyes are wide open. After the Sage's Program is activated, the brothers cooperate with Kanipan, but in order to escape from the now-collapsing management block, they pour all of their energy into G-RAT. Although they succeed in escaping, they lose their functionality in return.
Professor Taishi (タイシ博士, Taishi Hakase)
Voiced by: Shoichiro Akaboshi (Japanese)
An inventor who built Planet Sharaku 200 years ago. He is a great man who is respected by all inventors. His real name is Taishi Helvite. During his lifetime, Taishi created a robot that has his knowledge and memories. It was originally planned to be activated when a crisis befell the artificial planet, and after activating the Sage's Program, he would play the role of helping Angelica and the Planet Management Committee as a father, but it was destroyed by Namul, leading to Taishi's hatred of the people of Planet Sharaku. His thoughts are tampered with to force him to activate the Sage's Program. The other Planet Management Committee members seemed to think that the professor was a living being, but are quite surprised when they later learn that he was a robot.

== Episodes ==
=== Season 1 ===
Episode	Title	Directed by	Written by	Original release date
1	"To Become a Super Inventor!! (なるぞ! 超発明家!!, Naru zo! Chō Hatsumei-ka!!)"	Shunsuke Tada	Taishi Yamazaki	July 3, 1998
2	"Stop! Runaway Robot!! (止めろ! 暴走ロボト!!, Yamero! Bōsō Roboto!!)"	Shunsuke Tada	Ryota Yamaguchi	July 10, 1998
3	"The Day the Whales Came Out (クジラが出てきた日, Kujira ga Detekita Hi)"	Shunsuke Tada	Ryota Yamaguchi	July 17, 1998
4	"The Trouble with Postal Robots (郵便ロボトのなやみ, Yūbin Roboto no Nayami)"	Shunsuke Tada	Satoru Nishizono	July 24, 1998
5	"Burnt Bestseller (もえるベストセラー, Moeru Besutoserā)"	Shunsuke Tada	Reiko Yoshida	July 31, 1998
6	"Scorching Parts Up! (灼熱のパーツアップ!, Shakunetsu no Pātsuappu!)"	Shunsuke Tada	Ryota Yamaguchi	August 7, 1998
7	"The Disappearance of Captain Nuts (ナッツ隊長失そう事件, Nattsu Taichō Shissō Jiken)"	Shunsuke Tada	Satoru Nishizono	August 14, 1998
8	"Milk's Explosion of Worries! (ミルクの悩み大爆発!, Miruku no Nayami Daibakuhatsu!)"	Shunsuke Tada	Reiko Yoshida	August 21, 1998
9	"Do Robots Also Lay Eggs? (ロボトも卵うむデシか?, Roboto mo Tamago Umu Deshi ka?)"	Shunsuke Tada	Ryota Yamaguchi	August 28, 1998
10	"Super Invention at Ski Camp! (スキー合宿で超発明!, Sukī Gasshuku de Chō Hatsumei!)"	Shunsuke Tada	Satoru Nishizono	September 4, 1998
11	"My Robot in Nuts? (ナッツにマイロボト?, Nattsu ni Mai Roboto?)"	Shunsuke Tada	Reiko Yoshida	September 11, 1998
12	"Chaos with Human Ear Parts ピロピロピーで大混乱, Piropiropī de Daikonran)"	Shunsuke Tada	Ryota Yamaguchi	September 18, 1998
13	"S.O.S. from the Bottom of the Sea! (海の底からSOS!, Umi no Soko Kara Esu-Ō-Esu!)"	Shunsuke Tada	Reiko Yoshida	September 25, 1998
14	"A Rival? Ravioli Appears! (宿敵? ラビオリ登場!, Shukuteki? Rabiori Tōjō!)"	Shunsuke Tada	Ryota Yamaguchi	October 2, 1998
15	"Fierce Battle at the Inventor Grand Prix! (激闘! 発明グランプリ, Gekitō! Hatsumei Guranpuri)"	Shunsuke Tada	Ryota Yamaguchi	October 9, 1998
16	"Ravioli Falls in Love! (ラビオリ恋をする!, Rabiori Koi o Suru!)"	Shunsuke Tada	Reiko Yoshida	October 16, 1998
17	"A Dream About Kanipan! (カニパンにかける夢!, Kanipan ni Kakeru Yume!)"	Shunsuke Tada	Satoru Nishizono	October 23, 1998
18	"Aim for the Glorious Goal! (めざせ! 栄光のゴール, Mezase! Eikō no Gōru)"	Shunsuke Tada	Satoru Nishizono	October 30, 1998
19	"Super Kid Runaway! (スーパーキッド大暴走!, Super Kid Daibōsō!)"	Shunsuke Tada	Reiko Yoshida	November 6, 1998
20	"Give It to Me! TAISHI-Level License!! (よこせ! タイシ級免許!!, Yokose! Taishi-kyū Menkyo!!)"	Shunsuke Tada	Satoru Nishizono	November 13, 1998
21	"Professor Pepperoni Strikes Back!! (ペパロニ博士の逆襲!!, Peparoni Hakase no Gyakushū)"	Shunsuke Tada	Ryota Yamaguchi	November 20, 1998
22	"Panic on Garbage Island! (ゴミゴミ島で大パニック!, Gomi Gomijima de Dai Panikku!)"	Shunsuke Tada	Satoru Nishizono	November 27, 1998
23	"Infiltration! Robot Graveyard (潜入! ロボトの墓場, Sen'nyū! Roboto no Hakaba)"	Shunsuke Tada	Satoru Nishizono	December 4, 1998
24	"End of the Friendship Circuit?! (なかよし回路は終りデシか?!, Nakayoshi Kairo wa Owari de Shika?!)"	Shunsuke Tada	Reiko Yoshida	December 11, 1998
25	"Absolute Crisis! (絶対の危機!, Zettai no Kiki!)"	Shunsuke Tada	Ryota Yamaguchi	December 18, 1998
26	"Robot's Heart (ロボトのこころ, Roboto no Kokoro)"	Shunsuke Tada	Ryota Yamaguchi	December 25, 1998
27	"An Idol Inventor Is Born?! (アイドル発明家誕生?!, Aidoru Hatsumei-ka Tanjō?!)"	Shunsuke Tada	Satoru Nishizono	December 29, 1998
28	"Friendship Circuit Can't Be Regenerated! (なかよし回路再生不能!, Nakayoshi Kairo Saisei Funō!)"	Shunsuke Tada	Ryota Yamaguchi	January 8, 1999
29	"Searching in the Desert! (砂漠でグルングルン!, Sabaku de Gurungurun!)"	Shunsuke Tada	Reiko Yoshida	January 15, 1999
30	"Get the Clock Scab! (ゲットだ! 時計のかさぶた, Getto da! Tokei no Kasabuta)"	Shunsuke Tada	Ryota Yamaguchi	January 22, 1999
31	"Message to the Future (未来へのメッセージ, Mirai e no Messēji)"	Shunsuke Tada	Ryota Yamaguchi	January 29, 1999

=== Season 2 ===
Episode	Title	Directed by	Written by	Original release date
1	"Angelica (アンジェリカ, Anjerika)"	Hiroshi Ishiodori	Ryota Yamaguchi	February 5, 1999
2	"Sealed Memories (閉ざされた記憶, Tozasareta Kioku)"	Hiroshi Ishiodori	Reiko Yoshida	February 12, 1999
3	"Bonds of the Heart (心のきずな, Kokoro no Kizuna)"	Hiroshi Ishiodori	Chinatsu Hōjō	February 19, 1999
4	"In Search of the Past 過去を探して, Kako wo Sagashite)"	Hiroshi Ishiodori	Kenichi Araki	February 26, 1999
5	"Sweet Premonition (甘い予感, Amai Yokan)"	Hiroshi Ishiodori	Ryota Yamaguchi	March 5, 1999
6	"Hidden Power (秘められた力, Himerareta Chikara)"	Hiroshi Ishiodori	Kenichi Araki	March 12, 1999
7	"A Place for the Heart (心の居場所, Kokoro no Iibasho)"	Hiroshi Ishiodori	Reiko Yoshida	March 19, 1999
8	"Ann's Secret (アンの秘密, Ann no Himitsu)"	Hiroshi Ishiodori	Ryota Yamaguchi	March 26, 1999
9	"A Promise to Each Other (二人の約束, Futari no Yakusoku)"	Hiroshi Ishiodori	Reiko Yoshida	April 2, 1999
10	"Prelude to Collapse (崩壊の序曲, Houkai no Jokyoku)"	Hiroshi Ishiodori	Kenichi Araki	April 9, 1999
11	"Message (メッセージ, Mesēji)"	Hiroshi Ishiodori	Koji Ueda	April 16, 1999
12	"Reunion 再会, Saikai)"	Hiroshi Ishiodori	Ryota Yamaguchi	April 23, 1999
13	"Confession (告白, Kokuhaku)"	Hiroshi Ishiodori	Reiko Yoshida	April 30, 1999
14	"Ann's Lover (アンの恋人, Ann no Koibito)"	Hiroshi Ishiodori	Ryota Yamaguchi	May 7, 1999
15	"Countdown (カウントダウン, Kauntodaun)"	Hiroshi Ishiodori	Ryota Yamaguchi	May 14, 1999
16	"An Evil Plot (邪悪な陰謀, Jaaku na Inbou)"	Hiroshi Ishiodori	Koji Ueda	May 21, 1999
17	"Planetary Collapse (惑星崩壊, Wakusei Houkai)"	Hiroshi Ishiodori	Kenichi Araki	May 28, 1999
18	"Believe in Miracles (奇跡を信じて, Kiseki wo Shinjite)"	Hiroshi Ishiodori	Reiko Yoshida	June 4, 1999
19	"Uncontrollable (制御不能, Seigyo Funou)"	Hiroshi Ishiodori	Ryota Yamaguchi	June 11, 1999
20	"The Final Choice (最後の選択, Saigo no Sentaku)"	Hiroshi Ishiodori	Ryota Yamaguchi	June 18, 1999
21	"Farewell, Planet Sharaku (さらばシャラク星, Saraba Sharaku-hoshi)"	Hiroshi Ishiodori	Ryota Yamaguchi	June 25, 1999

== Music ==
Opening Themes

- "First Time Being In Love, I Knew It Was You (恋してはじめて知った君, Koishite Hajimete Shitta Kimi)"
  Lyrics by Ohta Shinichirou & Hata Hideki
  Composition and arrangement by Ohta Shinichirou, Kobayashi Masamichi & Arai Yasunori
  Performed by BAAD
- "LOVE LOVE Phantasy"
  Lyrics by Hero Matsui and Keichi Ueno
  Composition and arrangement by Keichi Ueno
  Performed by Whoops!!

Ending Themes

- "O·K!"
  Lyrics by Akihito Tokunaga & Terukado Ohnishi
  Composition and arrangement by XL
  Performed by XL
- "Someday (いつか, Itsuka)"
  Lyrics by Suzi Kim
  Composition and arrangement by Hero Matsui
  Performed by Whoops!!

== Media ==
=== Musical ===
A musical based on the series, named Hatsumei Boy Kanipan (発明BOYカニパン, Hatsumei Bōi Kanipan; trans. Inventor Boy Kanipan), was performed at the Ginza Hakuhinkan Theater from December 1998 to early January 1999. The musical had an original story by Yūji Mitsuya (one of the series' ADR directors), and starred Mizuki Sano as Kanipan, Yuta Enomoto as Salt, Ayako Morino as Nuts, Tetsurō Adachi as Ravioli, Masami Suzuki as Naruto and Mino, Chieko Higuchi as Taffy, and Kanako Mitsuhashi as Milk.

=== Manga ===
A one-shot manga adaptation written and illustrated by Toshio Tanigami was serialized in the October 1998 issue of Bessatsu CoroCoro Comic. It covers the first half of the anime.

Another manga, A-kyū Roboto!? Kid-kun (A級ロボト!?キッドくん; An A-Level Robot!? Kid-kun), was serialized in color at the end of Bessatsu CoroCoro Comic's April 1999 and August 1999 issues. Also written and illustrated by Tanigami, it is not a manga adaptation of the anime series, but an original story with Kid as the main character, and is a short manga with science fiction gags. Kanipan Club, which contained information on the anime and games, was also launched at the same time. It has not been published in book form or republished.

The monthly CoroCoro Comic magazine also published new information about the anime in its March 1999 issue, as well as game advertisements and articles by Sega and Taito from June to October of that year.

=== Video games ===
Hatsumei Boy Kanipan was originally planned to be a video game for the Sega Saturn, developed by Quintet from 1997 to 1998 as a spiritual successor to their SNES game Robotrek. However, the anime series was produced instead, and the game was eventually cancelled due to the immediate announcement of Chō Hatsumei Boy Kanipan.

Chō Hatsumei Boy Kanipan Asonde Kid DCDC (Deshideshi) (超発明BOYカニパン あそんでキッドDCDC（デシデシ）, Chō Hatsumei Bōi Kanipan Asonde Kiddo DCDC (Deshideshi); trans. Super Inventor Boy Kanipan Play Kid DCDC (Deshideshi)) is a VMU game released by Sega on April 22, 1999. A tie-in product for the anime, the device is colored translucent green, which is different from the normal VMU, and is a training game featuring Kid, where the player can allocate schedules, raise children, play minigames and play online battles with friends. It can be linked with Chō Hatsumei Boy Kanipan: Bōsō Roboto no Nazo!?, which would be released three months later. It occasionally appeared in the series as a memory device in the main story.

Chō Hatsumei Boy Kanipan: Bōsō Roboto no Nazo!? (超発明BOYカニパン 〜暴走ロボトの謎!?〜, Chō Hatsumei Bōi Kanipan: Bōsō Roboto no Nazo!?; trans. Super Inventor Boy Kanipan: The Mystery of the Runaway Robot!?) is a creative role-playing video game developed by Quintet, Shade and Zerosystem, and released by Sega for the Dreamcast on July 8, 1999. The game contradicts the series' story and borrows certain elements from the original series (likely due to the original game being cancelled). As a C-Level inventor, Kanipan and Kid are hard at work on becoming the best on Planet Sharaku when Kanipan's mentor, Professor Shu, is kidnapped by a nefarious group led by Namul who aim to use inventions for evil, and Kanipan goes to rescue him. On a planet where humans and robots coexist, Namul denies such a reality and uses his means to create another artificial planet where only humans can live.

The game involves players combining parts and materials to create weapons, equipment and other inventions, and using them to search for Professor Shu. Kanipan travels the world while interacting with various characters and objects that will give him hints or ideas for new inventions, some of which are used to interact with the player's surroundings or progress the game, but most are used to upgrade the player's Interface Robots. Players can create all types of items using the Invention System, as well as "Cores", which will give them new frames and increase the number of Interface Robots that they can have. The player will occasionally do battle which they control manually and use items and bombs that they create to fight enemies on a grid. Most grids are littered with obstacles that the player can take advantage of and attacks can be charged to improve damage or accuracy. The player can also discover hidden goods; for example, one item, the Mirumiru Scope (ミルミルスコープ, Mirumiru Sukōpu; Twinkle Scope), can be equipped to Kanipan to help the player find them). The player can also later use Zenny (money) to procure goods, heal their Robots and partake in various events.

The game is a spiritual successor to Quintet's Robotrek. Original traditional animation is used for the game's opening and cutscenes, and the game is played on a 3DCG field. It is compatible with the Jump Pack and the VMU game, Chō Hatsumei Boy Kanipan Asonde Kid DCDC (Deshideshi), from which players can transfer data and download minigames. Voices were provided by Junko Takeuchi as Kanipan, Rie Iwatsubo as Kid, Kan Tanaka as Professor Shu and Tacos, Kanako Mitsuhashi as Milk, Masami Iwasaki as Igor, Harumi Ikoma as Nuts, Takashi Matsuyama as Pochi and Borscht, Kei Mashima as Professor Pepperoni, Hiroki Takahashi as Namuru, Eiji Takemoto as Nachos and Piroshiki, Takeyoshi Naito as Macaroni, Maaya Sakamoto as Maria, Chieko Higuchi as Popo, Nanaho Katsuragi as Ravioli, Haruhi Nanao as the Secretary, Satoshi Tsuruoka as Morozoff, and Yumi Kakazu as Angelica.

Dreamcast Fan gave the game a score of 21 out of 30. Reviewers said that it was easy to play, the Invention System was unique and they could enjoy collecting hints, they could reconfirm the information that they heard once, which reduced their stress, and fans of the anime could enjoy the game, as well as its "beautiful" animated cutscenes. However, they stated that the process of the Invention System could be long, which they found difficult for people who were not good at RPGs. They wished that it would have been possible to download minigames from Chō Hatsumei Boy Kanipan Asonde Kid DCDC (Deshideshi), called the game's visuals "bland", and were disappointed that the game was released after the anime aired.

Taito released the game for the PlayStation as Chō Hatsumei Boy Kanipan: Hirameki☆Wonderland (超発明BOYカニパン 〜ヒラメキ☆ワンダーランド〜, Chō Hatsumei Bōi Kanipan: Hirameki☆Wonderland; trans. Super Inventor Boy Kanipan: Flashing☆Wonderland). It was scheduled to be released between July and August in 1999, but was postponed and moved to September 30 of that year. Although the title is different from the previously released Dreamcast version, the content is almost the same; character voices are omitted due to hardware limitations, and the graphics and gameplay were poor. Despite this, the game had 2D accents including new sprite animations and particle effects, an improved interface, altered cutscenes, and added areas that were intended to be in the Dreamcast version but did not make the final cut. Famitsu gave the game a score of 23 out of 40.

=== Home media ===
From June 21, 1999, to October 1999, Shochiku Home Video released Chō Hatsumei Boy Kanipan on video in 10 volumes. The volumes were published by Marvelous Entertainment.

A DVD box set of the original series containing all 31 episodes, named Hatsumei Boy Kanipan DVD-BOX (発明BOYカニパン DVD-BOX, Hatsumei Bōi Kanipan DVD-BOX; trans. Inventor Boy Kanipan DVD-BOX), was released by E-Net Frontier on January 26, 2007, with a postcard included as a bonus. Chō Hatsumei Boy Kanipan DVD-BOX (超発明BOYカニパン DVD-BOX, Chō Hatsumei Bōi Kanipan DVD-BOX; trans. Super Inventor Boy Kanipan DVD-BOX), a box set containing all 21 episodes, was released the following month on February 23, 2007.

=== CD ===
Marvelous published "LOVE LOVE Phantasy/Itsuka" as a single on January 20, 1999, and March 27, 1999. Since Marvelous was a startup company at the time, distribution and sales were outsourced to Pony Canyon. The song was also included in Whoops!!'s album P on July 16, 1999, and its reissue on March 10, 2006, along with some remixes.

On April 21, 1999, Marvelous released the tie-in image album KANIPAN, also distributed by Pony Canyon. The album contains a CD drama named "Kanidora (Kanipan Drama)", based on an original story by Ryōta Yamaguchi; image songs, the songs "Itsuka" and "LOVE IS" (from the Hatsumei Boy Kanipan musical), and a remix of "LOVE LOVE Phantasy", the "LoVE LoVE €URO PARADE Mix".
