= Jyutei Senki =

1993 video game

- Cover art
- Developer(s): TamTam
- Publisher(s): Enix Corporation
- Composer(s): Tsutomu Shimizu; Nobuhiro Makino
- Platform(s): Super Famicom
- Release: JP: August 27, 1993
- Genre(s): Strategy involving breeding/construction
- Mode(s): Single-player

Jyutei Senki (樹帝戦紀, Jutei Senki, lit. "Chronicles of the Tree Emperor") is a 1993 science fiction video game for the Super Famicom. It was published by the Enix Corporation.

== Gameplay ==
It is a simulation role playing game.

== Story ==
Humans have attained prosperity and high technological development. However, war broke out, and a race of automated machines called "Letum" began to destroy humanity. Magic soldiers called Junei fought them, and defeated them. Later, Vird II, King of Balmondia, releases the Letum again, and Arkfender, Lord of Algear, releases the Junei. These forces battle each other.

== Release ==
The game was released on August 27, 1993 for the Super Famicom and published by Enix. It was released exclusively to a Japanese audience.

== Reception ==
Famitsu gave it a score of 32 out of 40.

== See also ==
- List of Enix games
