= Suzuki Bakuhatsu =

2000 video game

- Developer: Sol
- Publisher: Enix
- Director: Koichi Yotsui
- Producer: Takehiro Ando
- Composer: Fantastic Plastic Machine
- Platform: PlayStation
- Release: JP: July 6, 2000
- Genre: Puzzle
- Mode: Single player

Suzuki Bakuhatsu (Note: Japanese: 鈴木爆発; lit. Suzuki Explosion) is a 2000 puzzle video game developed by Sol and published by Enix for the PlayStation. The game's story is told through still photographs and features Rin Ozawa as Suzuki as she goes through her normal daily routine. During her day, she finds bombs being in every day objects such as an orange or a cassette player that she has to dismantle. As the day progresses, she finds them in more outlandish locations such as in giant mech suits and the Moon. Gameplay in Suzuki Bakuhatsu involves the dismantling of these bombs as 3D logic puzzles.

The game was proposed by Yasuhito Watanabe, who initially pitched a game about a woman on a ferry who has to dismantle bombs. The game was made during a period of various unique and quirky games being released by various publishers, which allowed for it to move forward under producer Takehiro Ando. Ando changed some aspects of the games such as making the bombs less scary and more generally appealing. Most of the game was influenced by the pop culture the development team had watched in their youth, ranging from anime, music programs, detective dramas, pro-wrestlers and Japanese idols.

The game was released exclusively in Japan on July 6, 2000. While it did not reach the intended sales plan of a million copies, producer Takehiro Ando said it earned its development costs back. An English fan translation of the game was released in 2026.

== Gameplay and plot ==
Suzuki Bakuhatsu is a puzzle game about a young girl named Suzuki. As she goes about her daily routine, she comes a series of bombs hidden in every day items that she must defuse. These start with items such as an orange and a cassette player, but continues into more outrageous locations to defuse a bomb such as in giant mech suits and the Moon.

The game's stories is told through a series of photographs. For the bomb defusal, the player must defuse the bombs which are presented as 3D logic puzzles. Diffusing bombs involves tasks such as removing screws and cutting wires within a time limit. The bombs gradually become more complicated as making certain moves will make other moves inaccessible.

== Development ==
Suzuki Bakuhatsu was proposed by producer Yasuhito Watanabe who had previously worked on other PlayStation games such as Bust a Groove (1998). At the time he was known for suggesting quirky and unique projects for video games over well-recognized formats such as sword and sorcery-themed role-playing video games. Game designer Koichi Yotsui also had pitched the game among his three different proposed game projects, one of which would become Submarine Commander (2001). A compact disc was prepared for the initial project featuring a story involving a female student named Suzuki who searches for bombs on a ferry. Takehiro Ando, who was a new producer for Enix at the time, grew interested in the project and became the game's producer.

Initially, Suzuki was going to be modelled in 3D polygonal graphics. Ando said that the original plan was to incorporate live-action footage. Ando said while the standard set by polygonal women such as Aya Brea in Parasite Eve (1998) he said a real-life woman would be more attractive. The role for Suzuki went to model and actress Rin Ozawa. The live action photography in the game being done by Keisuke Naito. Naito had previously produced a nude photography series called Chingcame for the men's fashion magazine Smart. Ando said that Naito's photography "seemed like the perfect way to show Suzuki’s attractiveness." The team initially found telling a story through still photos in the game. Through trial and error, the director of the game, Koichi Yotsui, came up with a dynamic way of transitioning between the photos. This change led to a debate between Naito and a graphic designer in the game which Ando described as nearly being a confrontation. They eventually settled to the approach that is in the final game.

Ando had planned that the game would sell one-million copies, banking that the game would be a hit similar to other quirky and unique titles for the PlayStation such as PaRappa the Rapper (1996). Development on the game started on November 27, 1998. Ando said the game's team, which consisted of people who were in their 20s and 30s at the time, were influenced by media they knew from their childhood such as anime, music programs, detective dramas, pro-wrestlers and Japanese idols. During one sequence, that involves a parody of mecha anime the team got Ichirou Mizukito sing its 1970s anime inspired theme song. Ando said that they initially had trouble explaining the game to Mizuki, but recalled that he accepted the offer saying he could tell how passionate the team was for the project. Other music in the game was made by the Fantastic Plastic Machine.

The bomb disposal aspect of the game is based on the gameplay in Koichi Yotsui's previous game, Nostalgia 1907 (1991). One aspect Ando changed in the game was the design of the bombs. Initially they had been what he described as more "scary-looking bombs" but they were changed to ordinary objects. Initially, the bomb sections were done with 2D graphics, but as the team found it made the game appear old, these puzzles were re-designed to be 3D.

== Release and reception ==
Reception

Review score
Publication	Score
Play	92%

Suzuki Bakuhatsu was published by Enix and was only released in Japan on the PlayStation on July 6, 2000. In 2026, the game received an English fan translation. Ando later said in 2017 that while it did not sell a million copies, it sold enough to recoup the production costs.

Graeme Nicholson reviewed the game in Play complimenting its unique and refreshing gameplay and that it was a very positively addicting game.

Ando later described the game as being obscure and that Japanese audiences sometimes call it a bakage (lit. 'silly game').

Koji Kato of the comedy duo Gokuraku Tombo became a fan of the actress Rin Ozawa through playing the game. Kato and Ozawa would marry in July 2001.

== See also ==
- List of Enix games
- List of PlayStation games
