= The Granstream Saga =

1997 role-playing video game

- Developer: Shade[a]
- Publisher: WW: Sony Computer Entertainment NA: THQ[2]
- Director: Koji Yokota
- Producer: Ryoji Akagawa
- Designer: Koji Yokota
- Writer: Tomoyoshi Miyazaki Masami Ohkubo
- Composer: Masanori Hikichi Miyoko Takaoka Takako Ochiai
- Platform: PlayStation
- Release: JP: November 6, 1997 NA: June 29, 1998[3] EU: February 26, 1999
- Genre: Action role-playing
- Mode: Single-player

The Granstream Saga (グランストリーム伝紀, Guransutorīmu Denki) is an action role-playing game developed by Shade, a development team in Quintet, for the PlayStation. It is an intended spiritual successor to their previous Super NES titles, Illusion of Gaia and Terranigma (involving Tomoyoshi Miyazaki and Masanori Hikichi). The game was first published in Japan by Sony Computer Entertainment, then given a United States release by THQ.

The Granstream Saga is lauded as one of the first fully polygonal RPGs, as opposed to using polygonal characters with pre-rendered backgrounds, polygonal environments with scaling sprites, or other such combinations. The game features anime-style cutscenes by Production I.G. It is also somewhat unusual in that the characters the player meets in the game are faceless.

== Gameplay ==
Gameplay consists of top-down RPG exploration and storytelling. When the player character is confronted or ambushed by an enemy, the camera angle shifts to a 45 degree angle, and combat begins. Combat consists of real-time one-on-one battles. In real-time combat, the player utilizes several weapons and abilities, such as swords, daggers, axes, warhammers, and various spells. When not in combat, they spend a very large time exploring, gaining new weapons and armor, and conversing with the many characters of the different continents.

Rather than gaining levels from combat as in most RPGs, the player character's level is raised at set points in the game.

== Plot ==
The game takes place after a short animated sequence where Eon and Valos cut a section of land off of Shilf. After discovering a young boy has disappeared, Valos performs locating magic to find the boy in an ancient cemetery. The spirit of the Wise Man speaks to Eon here, and asks him to find and help his daughter, Arcia, to use the Orb and recite the lifting verse to raise the land. Together they make it a goal to raise the other continents as well, and set off on a journey.

== Reception ==
Reception

Aggregate score
Aggregator	Score
GameRankings	66%

Review scores
Publication	Score
AllGame	3/5
Electronic Gaming Monthly	7.125 / 10 (Note: Three critics of Electronic Gaming Monthly gave the game each a score of 7/10, and another gave it 7.5/10.)
EP Daily	7 / 10
Famitsu	31 / 40
Game Informer	7.5 / 10
GameFan	89% (Note: In GameFan's viewpoint of the game, three critics gave it each a score of 92, 84, and 90.)
GameRevolution	B−
GameSpot	6.7 / 10
IGN	6 / 10
Next Generation	2/5
RPGamer	2.5 / 5
RPGFan	67%

The game received average reviews according to the review aggregation website GameRankings. Next Generation said that the game "isn't a bad effort; it's just an average one. Neither the gameplay nor the storyline elevates it into the same category as Square's Final Fantasy, Konami's Suikoden, or Capcom's Breath of Fire." In Japan, Famitsu gave it a score of 31 out of 40.

GamePro said the game was "one of the most enjoyable new role-playing games of the year", praising its intriguing storyline, enemies, and frantic fighting action. They considered the "voice-overs during most of the cut scenes" as "audio highlights" and concluded its blend of "classic RPG elements (puzzle solving, spells, saving mankind) with those of the action/fighter genre" make it a fun and challenging adventure. (Note: GamePro gave the game three 4.5/5 scores for graphics, sound, and control, and 5/5 for fun factor.)

Hardcore Gaming 101 gave it a positive retrospective review, commending its combat system, story and presentation.
