= Soul Blazer =

1992 video game

- North American box art
- Developer: Quintet
- Publisher: Enix
- Director: Masaya Hashimoto
- Producer: Yasuyuki Sone
- Programmer: Masaya Hashimoto
- Writer: Tomoyoshi Miyazaki
- Composer: Yukihide Takekawa
- Platform: Super Nintendo Entertainment System
- Release: JP: January 31, 1992; NA: November 27, 1992; PAL: January 27, 1994
- Genre: Action role-playing
- Mode: Single-player

Soul Blazer, released in Japan as Soul Blader, (Note: Japanese: ソウルブレイダー, Hepburn: Sōru Bureidā) is an action role-playing video game developed by Quintet and published by Enix for the Super Nintendo Entertainment System. It was released in 1992 in Japan and North America, but not released in Europe until 1994. It was not released in the United Kingdom.

It is an action role-playing game where the player takes the role of The Master's servant, to destroy monsters and release the captured souls of a world's inhabitants. The player must constantly switch between restored areas and corrupted zones to progress, effectively rebuilding the world piece by piece. The servant can be named by the player, but in a later game developed by Quintet, Illusion of Gaia, he is referred to as "Blazer".

== Gameplay ==
Hero fighting the first boss of the game

The player frees a series of towns by fighting monsters in traditional dungeon crawl battles. Destroying monster lairs in the dungeons causes a soul belonging to a former town occupant to be liberated and reincarnated. This is often a human, but it could be anything from a dolphin to a talking tulip. As souls are freed, the town is reconstructed around the people. The new town occupants give the player advice and items. When the player defeats the boss monster imprisoning the soul of the head of each town, the area is cleared and the player can continue. After the hero frees the first six villages, he is granted access to the "World of Evil", where the final villain awaits.

== Plot ==
The Master sends one of his heavenly divine companions in the form of a human warrior to the Freil Empire, where the evil spirit Deathtoll has destroyed all villages and incarcerated the souls of all living creatures in his monster lairs, leaving the world empty. The warrior must defeat the monsters and liberate the inhabitants from the lairs, gradually repopulating the kingdom.

The Hero (Blazer) is the protagonist, a divine angel, deity or lesser-deity, or avatar, sent by The Master to restore the world's creatures to life. Skilled with a sword and possessing the ability to speak with any living thing and be understood, he battles the hordes of Deathtoll with the assistance of his Soul helpers.

The warrior travels throughout the kingdom, defeating monsters in each of six regions to gather six magic stones, each a different color, in order to open the path to Deathtoll, who now resides in the World of Evil. The warrior must also find three sacred artifacts to call upon the power of the phoenix to defeat Deathtoll.

On the way, the warrior falls in love with Lisa, the daughter of a brilliant inventor named Dr. Leo. The warrior learns that the world's devastation came about after King Magridd imprisoned Dr. Leo and forced him to make a machine to contact Deathtoll. After being summoned, Deathtoll offered the king a gold piece for each soul from his kingdom, and under the counsel of his wife, Magridd agreed, but was eventually imprisoned himself. Dr. Leo is still in Magridd Castle's prison after the warrior frees him, and Leo later sacrifices his life to kill the queen, who still wanted to bargain with Deathtoll.

After reaching the World of Evil and defeating Deathtoll, the warrior is returned to Heaven, but one year later, the Master realizes that the warrior misses his life as a human, and agrees to send him back to the Freil Empire under the condition that the hero would not have any memory of his past. The hero wakes up in Grass Valley, where Lisa recognizes him. Though he does not remember her, they leave together and renew their friendship.

== Development and release ==
Soul Blazer was released on January 31, 1992, in Japan, on November 27 in North America, and on January 27, 1994, in Europe.

The soundtrack of the game was composed by Yukihide Takekawa. It was published in Japan by the record label Apollon on February 21, 1992.

The game has never been re-released in any form.

== Reception ==
Reception

Aggregate score
| Aggregator | Score |
|---|---|
| GameRankings | 85.58% |

Review scores
| Publication | Score |
|---|---|
| AllGame | 4/5 |
| Dragon | 3/5 |
| Electronic Gaming Monthly | 8/10, 9/10, 8/10, 8/10 |
| Famitsu | 8/10, 9/10, 9/10, 6/10 |
| Game Informer | 8.5/10, 8.75/10, 8.5/10 |
| GameFan | 95%, 92% |
| Nintendo Power | 3.875/5 |
| Super Play | 89% |
| Total! | (UK) 89% (DE) 2+ |
| VideoGames & Computer Entertainment | 8/10 |
| Control | 77% |
| Game Zero Magazine | 84.5/100 |
| N-Force | 84/100 |
| SNES Force | 84% |
| Super Action | 93% |
| The Super Famicom | 6/10 |
| Super Gamer | 85% |
| Super Pro | 85/100 |

The Japanese publication Micom BASIC Magazine ranked Soul Blazer third in popularity in its April 1992 issue, and it received a 22.26/30 score in a 1993 readers' poll conducted by Super Famicom Magazine, ranking among Super Famicom titles at the number 66 spot. The game received generally favorable reception from critics, holding a rating of 85.58% based on six reviews according to review aggregator GameRankings. Electronic Gaming Monthly's four reviewers gave it the Editor's Choice Gold award. They compared it favorably with The Legend of Zelda: A Link to the Past, with one of the reviewers stating that Soul Blazer is equally challenging and fun to play.

=== Sales and accolades ===
Quintet reported that Soul Blazer sold 295,000 copies worldwide, with 200,000 copies sold in Japan, 70,000 copies sold in North America, and 25,000 copies sold in Europe. IGN ranked Soul Blazer 76th on its "Top 100 SNES Games of All Time" describing the game as bold and memorable. In 1995, Total! listed the game 35th in their "Top 100 SNES Games", commenting its game size, graphics and strong storyline.

== Legacy ==
Although it is usually considered part of the unofficial "Gaia trilogy", according to the producer of Enix USA, there is no connection between Soul Blazer and Gaia. "Soul Blazer" is instead related to ActRaiser, thus acting as "a sort of prequel" to the latter title.

Game journalists and fans often considered Soul Blazer to be the first in an unofficial series followed by Illusion of Gaia and Terranigma. This series is nicknamed either "Quintet Trilogy", "Gaia Trilogy" or "Heaven and Earth Trilogy" (after Terranigma's Japanese title, which translates to "the creation of Heaven and Earth") by fans. The Granstream Saga is an intended spiritual successor of the series, as it was developed by Shade (a studio composed of former Quintet personnel), has similar themes, and makes references to the previous titles.
