= Mystic Heroes =

2002 video game

- North American cover art for PS2
- Developers: Koei; Quintet (GBA)
- Publisher: Koei
- Platforms: GameCube, Game Boy Advance, PlayStation 2
- Release: GameCube, Game Boy Advance: JP: March 29, 2002; NA: September 30, 2002 (GC); PAL: December 13, 2002 (GC); PlayStation 2: JP: November 16, 2002; WW: November 24, 2002
- Genre: Hack and slash
- Modes: Single-player, multiplayer

Mystic Heroes is a hack and slash video game developed by Koei. The game is loosely based on Investiture of the Gods, a Chinese supernatural novel about the fall of the Shang dynasty and the rise of the Zhou dynasty.

A Game Boy Advance version, known as Magical Hōshin (マジカル封神, Majikaru Hōshin) and developed by Quintet, was released simultaneously with the GameCube version, known as Battle Hōshin (バトル封神, Batoru Hōshin), exclusively in Japan on March 29, 2002. The PlayStation 2 version, known as Chō Battle Hōshin (超・バトル封神, Chō Batoru Hōshin), has additional characters and gameplay modes.

== Gameplay ==
Mystic Heroes is a hack and slash similar to Koei's Dynasty Warriors. Players can perform melee attacks and element spells, which become more powerful with continuous use. The game has eight stages.

There are four playable characters, and four unlockable characters in the PS2 version, for a total of eight. The game features a single-player story mode and three additional single-player modes, as well as co-op and versus multiplayer. The game levels take place in a variety of settings from deserts, to castles, to swamps. The enemies are consistently soldiers, but have a variety of different bosses depending upon the level.

== Plot ==
Long ago in a legendary land, Emperor Kang and his wife Sheva ruled with an iron fist. Tai and Naja, two elite mystics, sealed them away in Mt. Houshin, thus restoring peace. But Kang's son, Cyrus, built up an army to battle the mystics in an attempt to free his father. At this time two more mystics, Shiga and Lani, joined the fight alongside Tai and Naja. The four mystics along with their friends once again saved the land and returned the peace. Now Emperor Kang, Sheva, and Generals Grifon and Kai start to plan their escape. Grifon brings up the existence of something known as the "Dragon Star", which could free them. Kang calls upon the powers of the Dragon Star, and he along with all of his minions are set free, giving Kang the chance to rise once again to dominate the land. This game takes place after Hōshin Engi, Magical Hōshin (this game takes place after the first title) and Hōshin Engi 2.

The player can choose to play as Tai, Shiga, Lani, or Naja.

== Reception ==
Reception

Aggregate score
Aggregator	Score		
Aggregator	GBA	GameCube	PS2
Metacritic	N/A	67/100	67/100

Review scores
Publication	Score		
Publication	GBA	GameCube	PS2
Edge	N/A	7/10	N/A
Electronic Gaming Monthly	N/A	5.5/10	N/A
Famitsu	30/40	33/40	32/40
Game Informer	N/A	7.75/10	N/A
GamePro	N/A	3.5/5	3.5/5
GameSpot	N/A	7.3/10	7.3/10
GameSpy	N/A	N/A	2/5
IGN	N/A	6.3/10	7/10
Nintendo Power	N/A	3.6/5	N/A
Official U.S. PlayStation Magazine	N/A	N/A	2.5/5

Mystic Heroes received "mixed or average reviews" on both platforms according to the review aggregation website Metacritic.

In Japan, Famitsu gave the game a score of 33 out of 40 for the GameCube version, 32 out of 40 for the PS2 version, and 30 out of 40 for the Game Boy Advance version.
