= Eggs of Steel: Charlie's Eggcellent Adventure =

1998 video game

- North American box art
- Developer: Rhythm and Hues Studios
- Publishers: JP: Enix; NA: Atlus USA
- Platform: PlayStation
- Release: JP: July 30, 1998; NA: November 1998
- Genre: Platform game
- Mode: Single-player

Eggs of Steel: Charlie's Eggcellent Adventure, known in Japan as Hello Charlie!!, (Note: Japanese: ハローチャーリー!!, Hepburn: Harō Chārī!!) is a 1998 platform game developed by VFX and animation company Rhythm and Hues Studios and published by Enix and Atlus USA for the PlayStation. It started off as a rental exclusive to Blockbuster Video but then retail copies were made.

== Synopsis ==
Charlie Takanite accidentally spills coffee on his work station while reaching for his donuts at the MomSteel Steel Factory, causing the machinery to become autonomous and take over the factory. Charlie searches through the factory to find the reset switch while avoiding robots, machinery and Blast Furnace Bill, a hostile employee.

== Gameplay ==
The player controls Charlie, who must venture through 43 levels and 12 bosses to shut down the sentient factory. The objectives includes locating a certain number of time clocks in order to advance as well as collecting 4 keys to shut down the factory. Charlie can jump, duck and roll to get around during levels and also has a wrench which is used to both defeat enemies and open doors.

== Reception ==
Reception

Review scores
Publication	Score
AllGame	2/5
Electronic Gaming Monthly	5.75/10 (Note: In Electronic Gaming Monthly's review of the game, one critic gave it a score of 4.5/10, two others gave it each a score of 6/10, and another one gave it 6.5/10.)
Famitsu	26/40
Game Informer	2.5/10
GameSpot	4.1/10
Joystick	1%

The game received unfavorable reviews. In Japan, Famitsu gave it a score of 26 out of 40.

GameRevolution listed Eggs of Steel as 20th on their list of the 50 Worst Game Names Ever.
