= Paladin's Quest =

1992 video game

- North American cover art
- Developer: Copya System
- Publishers: JP: Asmik Corporation; NA: Enix
- Designer: Hidenori Shibao
- Composer: Kōhei Tanaka
- Platform: Super Nintendo Entertainment System
- Release: JP: November 13, 1992; NA: October 1993
- Genre: Role-playing
- Mode: Single-player

Paladin's Quest, originally released as Lennus: Kodai Kikai no Kioku (レナス 古代機械の記憶; "Lennus: Memories of an Ancient Machine") in Japan, is a utopian/dystopian science fantasy role-playing video game developed by Copya System and published in Japan by Asmik Corporation on November 13, 1992, for the Super Nintendo Entertainment System. It was published in North America by Enix in October 1993. It was different from other role-playing games at the time, because when the player casts magic, it takes away HP (health points) instead of MP (magic points/power).

Its sequel, Lennus II, was only released in Japan.

== Plot ==
The game centers on a boy named Chezni who, on a dare, activates an ancient machine called Dal Gren and in doing so releases a being of immense power and evil. As a result, the magic school is destroyed and the headmaster of the school orders Chezni to destroy Dal Gren at whatever cost before it destroys the world. During his travels, he meets a girl named Midia, very much like himself, who wishes to help him on his quest, and numerous other mercenaries that come to aid Chezni. The main antagonist is a young dictator named Zaygos, who wants to use the Dal Gren for his own nefarious purposes.

== Gameplay ==
The player character travels through dungeons, towns, and an overworld map, battling in random encounters. In case of a battle, the game switches to first-person, similar to the Dragon Warrior games. The battles are turn-based. Increasing a character's speed increases the chances of acting earlier within a turn, but does not change how frequently that character's turns come about. From each battle, characters accrue experience points, which eventually lead to higher levels and better attributes. During battle, use of healing items usually, but not always, takes priority and occurs before the enemy can strike.

The magic system has no form of MP for the characters. Instead, characters cast spells by spending their own HP. Only one spell directly heals HP, and using it kills the caster to heal the rest of the party.

Instead of learning spells individually, characters unlock spells by learning to wield the powers of eight "spirits": Fire, Earth, Water, Air, Sphere, Sky, Heart, and Light. Each spirit provides a single spell, each unique pair of spirits provides an additional spell, and learning all eight unlocks an additional spell, for a total of 37. So, for example, a character who knows the "Fire", "Sphere", and "Light" spirits would know six spells: one each of the three spirits and one for each of the three spirit combinations ("Fire+Light", "Fire+Sphere", and "Sphere+Light"). No statistic universally enhances spell-casting ability. Instead, characters gain experience in each spirit as they cast related spells; a combination spell's power is based on both spirits it uses.

Items cannot be used in battle unless they are equipped, traditional healing spells are nonexistent, and extra healing items cannot be purchased. The primary healing items are healing "bottles", which are good for nine uses each. These bottles can be refilled cheaply in most towns. The only other healing items are certain pieces of equipment that can be used as an unlimited healing item, but can only heal the wearer, and cannot be used outside of battle.

The player controls a party of up to four characters: up to two main characters, while the rest of the party slots can be filled by mercenaries. Although the player controls a mercenary's actions in battle, the player has no control over the equipment they wear and cannot purchase spirits for them. Many mercenaries have spirits not yet available to the player, and so have spells not yet available to the main characters. Some mercenaries lack a healing bottle, preventing them from healing in battle. New, stronger mercenaries become available as the player progresses through the story (usually for a price), but it is up to the player whether to continue by leveling their old mercenaries or hiring new ones. All mercenaries may be rehired, with the exception of a single mercenary tied to a story event.

== Music ==
The musical score for Paladin's Quest was composed by anime and game composer Kōhei Tanaka. A promotional MiniDisc containing 10 tracks of the game's original music was released by Asmik under the title Welcome to the Lennus World! A separate soundtrack titled Lennus: Memory of the Ancient Machine Original Album also contains 10 tracks, half composed of arranged instrumental medleys of the game's music and the other half consisting of dramatic dialogue. The album was released by Future Land on December 2, 1992.

== Reception ==
Reception

Review scores
Publication	Score
Electronic Gaming Monthly	6.6/10
Super Play	62%
The Super Famicom	73/100

Paladin's Quest received mixed to negative reviews. GamePro commented that the game "feels rather stale. Its dialogue, story, transitions, settings, and even its gameplay seem to have been done before." They criticized the system wherein magic usage draws from the character's pool of hit points, and found the characters in general underpowered against the game's enemies, requiring tedious backtracking to inns and reloading of saves. Mike Weigand of Electronic Gaming Monthly commented, "For fans of Soul Blazer, this borrows the perspective, but it isn't as interactive, plus combat isn't as direct. Fans of these kinds of RPG games will probably be more than satisfied." Zy Nicholson reviewed the game as an import in British magazine Super Play. He commented that Paladin's Quest is short and falls within the graphical limitations of the last-generation NES, both things which he found particularly hard to accept given the cart's above-average size and accordingly above-average price. He also described the controls as very awkward. He concluded that fanatics of Japanese RPGs would still find the game enjoyable due to the compelling and sometimes humorous story, but warned that it does not hold up well to contemporary Japanese RPGs such as Secret of Mana.

== Sequel ==
A sequel to Paladin's Quest, Lennus II: Fuuin no Shito (レナスII 封印の使徒; "Lennus II: The Apostles of the Seals"), was released by Asmik Corporation for the Super Famicom in Japan only, on July 28, 1996. Enix had dropped support for the Super Nintendo Entertainment System by this time.

The plot centers around a hero, Farus, who must find four orbs to avert an apocalypse. He is the only character central to the player's party; other members are recruited and may be dismissed if a superior replacement is found. The music was critically acclaimed, and two tracks were recorded by the Tokyo Philharmonic Orchestra for release on the Orchestral Game Concert compilations.

Gameplay is fairly similar to the original Lennus / Paladin's Quest:

- The player can swap out mercenary equipment.
- There have been some revisions to the magic system.
  - There are eight spirits: Fire, Light, Wind, Gold, Earth, Sky, Water, and Void, with one spell for each spirit and each pair of spirits, for 36 spells.
  - Farus starts the game with three of the eight spirits and can gain the powers of the other five through sidequests. He can only cast spells from the spirits he currently has equipped, and only has a limited number of slots (starting with only a single slot, with three more slots unlockable through sidequests for a maximum of four, allowing up to 10 of the 36 spells to be available at a time), and can only swap spirits outside of combat.
  - Much like in Paladin's Quest, each mercenary has a fixed repertoire of spirits, which are automatically equipped and cannot be swapped out.
  - Instead of building up spirit skill ratings by repeatedly casting associated spells, spirits are powered up by defeating monsters, who yield a sort of spirit-specific experience points in addition to regular experience points.
