= ActRaiser 2 =

1993 video game

- North American cover art
- Developers: Quintet; Ancient
- Publishers: JP/NA: Enix; EU: Ubi Soft
- Director: Masaya Hashimoto
- Producer: Yasuhiro Fukushima
- Designers: Hitoshi Ariga; Hiroshi Hayashi; Naoko Suzuki
- Programmer: Masaya Hashimoto
- Artist: Ayano Koshiro
- Writers: Ayano Koshiro; Tomoyoshi Miyazaki
- Composer: Yuzo Koshiro
- Series: ActRaiser
- Platform: Super Nintendo Entertainment System
- Release: JP: 29 October 1993; NA: November 1993; EU: November 1994
- Genre: Platform
- Mode: Single-player

ActRaiser 2 (Note: Also known as ActRaiser 2: Crusade to Silence (Japanese: アクトレイザー2 沈黙への聖戦, Hepburn: AkutoReizā 2: Chinmoku e no Seisen) in Japan.) is a side-scrolling platform game for the Super Nintendo Entertainment System developed by Quintet and published by Enix in 1993.

The game is a sequel to the original ActRaiser, but the storyline is not directly connected to its predecessor. Otherwise, the given story draws concepts from the famous religious epics Paradise Lost and the Divine Comedy.

Unlike the original game, which alternately combined platform game sequences and god game sequences, ActRaiser 2 is only a platform game.

== Gameplay ==
Gameplay screenshot

Gameplay for ActRaiser 2 consists primarily of side-scrolling platform action, similar to the "Professional!"/"Action" mode from the original game, while completely removing the city building simulation. The player, assuming the role of the "Master" (still referred to as "God" in the Japanese version), controls a floating palace to inspect the people of the world below. After hearing their plight, the Master descends to the world below to fight the monsters and rid the land of evil. Like the original, each area contains two "acts"; the first act of an area consists of monsters spawned from a lesser demon named after an unfavorable condition, while the second act consists of monsters spawned from the primary evil, named after one of the seven deadly sins, with heightened challenge and peril.

The side-scrolling action for ActRaiser 2 is more advanced than its predecessor. Controlling the Master, who now has a full set of functional wings, the player must navigate through dungeons and avoid certain perils by jumping, flying, falling, and floating to platforms. Armed only with a sword, and a shield which can deflect some attacks, the Master becomes heavily dependent upon magic. Magic is executed by holding down the designated button to "charge up" and is then released, consuming a magic scroll which is limited when the Master enters an area. When released, the magic may take various forms depending on the position of the Master. This is different from the first ActRaiser in which the player had to select a particular magic before descending down to the world to fight monsters and was limited to only that magic for the duration of battle. In ActRaiser 2, each magic is designed for particular situations and some magic is more powerful than others. By increasing the difficulty level at the options screen, the time it takes to "charge up" magic is increased, adding more difficulty to the game. The game's difficulty is also increased in that monsters require much more damage to be destroyed. Death Heim cannot be accessed through easy mode.

== Synopsis ==
The game begins with the Master battling with Tanzra (still "Satan" in the Japanese version). In this game, a backstory is given as to why Tanzra hates the Master so vehemently. Tanzra, who was once the Master's servant, led a rebellion against him, but lost and was banished from the Sky Castle (Heaven).

Ripped and torn, the slain body of Tanzra fell to the underworld. Feeding on the intense hatred each held for the Master, Tanzra's seven deadly sins and their minions combined their power to raise the spirit of their mighty leader. Tanzra, now vowing revenge for his defeat by the Master, unleashed these demons upon the world. The player in this game assumes the role of the Master, aided by his angelic associates, known as Crystallis.

Some of the stages in the game are meant to be ironic regarding the blighting nature of Tanzra's demons. The townsmen in the city of Leon are sent to the underground prison of Gratis (meaning free without charge) for not paying their taxes by a newly-appointed king named Kolunikus, who is afflicted by Doom.

After the player slays the first six deadly sins, the Tower of Babel (renamed "Tower of Souls" in the western versions), the final staged level of the game, appears, in which the Master fights the final sin, Destruction, a mechanically engineered god representing Pride. Defeating the false god, the Death Heim, an underworld where Tanzra is residing, emerges. Tanzra created an extraordinarily powerful barrier which renders conventional descending as the player did previously useless. Left with no other options, player descends into Death Heim using the Sky Castle domain as a battering ram. Tanzra's barrier is undone upon the Sky Castle's crash-landing, but the Sky Castle is ruined and angels suffered many casualties. Those few who were still alive were finished off by the revived Tanzra, but Tanzra fails to kill one wounded angel in time before he transfers his last vestige of power to the player. Being the only one unscathed to battle Tanzra, the player first fights again against the resurrected seven sins, as well as Tanzra himself, a beast frozen waist-deep in a lake of ice (just as Satan was in the Inferno in The Divine Comedy).

Tanzra was eventually defeated and slain, the player has disappeared and no one knows what became of him. During the game's ending, it is declared that "The Master will live forever" and, as the credits roll, an image of the statue of the Master is shown slowly eroding over time. The statue's sword and right wing fall off, suggesting the growth of civilization and the increase of mankind's self-sufficiency. This reflects the ending of the original ActRaiser, where the angel speculates that someday the world may be so independent that it will forget about the Master.

== Development and release ==
According to developer Quintet, ActRaiser 2 was made at the request of Enix of America, and designed according to their specifications.

ActRaiser 2 was released in Japan on October 29, 1993 for the Super Famicom.

== Reception ==
Reception

Review scores
Publication	Score
Computer and Video Games	86/100
Edge	5/10
Electronic Gaming Monthly	9/10, 8/10, 9/10, 9/10
Famitsu	7/10, 5/10, 6/10, 6/10
Game Informer	8.5/10
GameFan	94%, 88%, 95%, 94%
GamesMaster	41%
IGN	7.5/10
Official Nintendo Magazine	92/100
Super Play	69%
Total!	(UK) 87% (DE) 2+
Game Zero Magazine	70.5/100
Hippon Super!	7/10
Nintendo Game Zone	69/100
SNES Force	84/100
Super Gamer	82/100
Super Pro	88/100

ActRaiser 2 received a 20.3/30 score in a readers' poll conducted by Super Famicom Magazine. The game garnered generally favorable reception from critics.

=== Sales and accolades ===
Quintet reported that ActRaiser 2 sold 180,000 copies worldwide, with 40,000 copies sold in Japan and Europe respectively, and 100,000 copies sold in North America. In 2018, Complex rated Actraiser 2 81st on their "The Best Super Nintendo Games of All Time" list. They commented that the game is great despite being strictly a platformer and not having the god elements from the first game. In 1995, Total! ranked the game 38th on its "Top 100 SNES Games" list.

== Legacy ==
In 1996, Sega announced that they would be publishing a Quintet-developed remake of ActRaiser 1 and 2, tentatively titled Act Remix, for the Sega Saturn, but roughly halfway through development Quintet concluded that the ActRaiser series was outmoded, and they drastically reworked the game, which was ultimately titled Solo Crisis. Quintet started coding a third game in the ActRaiser series, for the Nintendo 64, but never finished it. In May 2008, Fumiaki Shiraishi, the lead programmer for Final Fantasy Crystal Chronicles: My Life as a King, noted in an interview that he would like to make an ActRaiser sequel.
