= Terranigma =

1995 video game

- European cover art
- Developer: Quintet (Note: Re-release developed and published by Clear River Games)
- Publishers: JP: Enix; PAL: Nintendo
- Director: Tomoyoshi Miyazaki
- Producers: Masaya Hashimoto; Shinji Futami; Jun Toda
- Designer: Tomoyoshi Miyazaki
- Artist: Kamui Fujiwara
- Writers: Tomoyoshi Miyazaki; Reiko Takebayashi
- Composers: Miyoko Takaoka; Masanori Hikichi
- Platform: Super Nintendo Entertainment System
- Release: JP: October 20, 1995; PAL: December 19, 1996
- Genre: Action role-playing
- Mode: Single-player

Terranigma (Note: Japanese: 天地創造, Hepburn: Tenchi Sōzō; lit. 'The Creation of Heaven and Earth') is a 1995 action role-playing game developed by Quintet for the Super Nintendo Entertainment System (SNES), with manga artist Kamui Fujiwara acting as the character designer. The game tells the story of the Earth's resurrection by the hands of a boy named Ark, and its progress from the evolution of life to the present day. The game is the third entry in an unofficial trilogy of action role-playing games created by Quintet, including Soul Blazer (1992) and Illusion of Gaia (1993). The game has been met with critical acclaim for its presentation, gameplay, and story, while being criticized for its difficulty.

Terranigma was published in Japan by Enix on October 20, 1995, and in Europe and Australia by Nintendo starting in December 1996; the game was not released in North America due to Enix having already closed its U.S. branch by the time localization had finished, and was not re-released for over thirty years due to complicated issues relating to its rights. A re-release on Nintendo Switch, Nintendo Switch 2, PlayStation 4, PlayStation 5, Xbox Series X and S, and Windows (via Steam and GOG.com), published and developed by Clear River Games, was announced on August 24, 2026. This re-release marks the first time the game was made officially available in North America.

== Gameplay ==
Ark fights enemies in the first dungeon area.

The game keeps a top-down perspective view of the world and utilizes an action-based real-time battle system that allows the player to perform different techniques depending on whether the protagonist is running, jumping, attacking, or using a combination of these three actions. Each attack is meant for dealing more damage to certain kinds of enemies, though in most cases there is little to no difference regardless of the technique used. Projectiles launched at Ark can be blocked by the guard technique, which is otherwise ineffective against melee attacks.

With each victory, experience points are gained, increasing the protagonist's level and his maximum hit points, strength, defense, and luck. Slain enemies sometimes leave behind gems which can be used to buy weapons, armors, healing items, and spells. There are no magic points in the game; all spells take the form of one-time use items instead. The player must collect Magirocks and take them to a magic shop to have them transformed into magic rings and summon medals. Those items are used up when casting the corresponding spell and then turn back to Magirocks which may be exchanged for new spells again. Upon defeating bosses and completing miscellaneous tasks, new types of magic become available.

== Plot ==
=== Setting and characters ===
In Terranigma, the planet is portrayed as a hollow sphere that has both an external and internal face. Since the beginning of the Earth, the external Lightside, the surface world, stood for growth whereas the internal Darkside, the underworld, represented decline. Over the course of billions of years, these two forces came to be called God and Devil. Regardless of this inner antagonism, rapid progress took root and primitive life forms evolved to plants, animals, and humans. Technology and industry further expanded civilization, but the fight between God and the Devil was still taking place, more fiercely than ever. The conflict culminated in a final battle in Antarctica on the surface world, where neither of the two forces was victorious. The continents of the surface world submerged into the sea and the underworld was sealed away.

=== Plot ===
The first chapter, "The Outset", introduces Ark, a mischievous boy living in Crysta, the only village in the underworld. After opening a forbidden door and touching a mysterious box containing a friendly demon named Yomi, every citizen in the village is frozen. The only unaffected person, the Elder, guides him to resurrect the continents of the surface world in order to unfreeze the people. For the first time ever, a human being leaves Crysta to explore the underworld, a frozen wasteland of imposing crystal mountains and rivers of magma. He conquers the trials of five towers, each representing one continent, and reraises the Earth's mainland. The Elder then instructs him towards the surface world and to resurrect all living beings. Ark says goodbye to his lifelong devoted friend Elle and departs to the Lightside.

In the second chapter, "Resurrection of the World", after crossing a dimensional crevasse, Ark is confronted with the Earth's barren former surface. His first task is to free the giant tree Ra from a parasite. This resurrects all plants in the world, helping Ark cross the mountains of Guiana. He travels further into the world, reviving birds, the wind, animals, and eventually mankind.

In the third chapter, "Resurrection of the Genius", the Elder tells Ark in a dream to keep helping humanity grow, as the world is still in the fledgling stages. He continues his journey, travelling and expanding cities, assisting with groundbreaking inventions, and also—much to his surprise—encountering a Lightside twin of Elle, living as the adoptee of a French king but rendered mute by a traumatic childhood event. Ark cures her, and over time she grows close to him. Still following the Elder's commands, Ark ultimately awakes Beruga, a scientist who survived the apocalypse through cryogenic sleep. Beruga tells Ark of his vision of paradise: all insignificant life is killed with a virus named Asmodeus and everyone else is made immortal as zombies. Ark tries to attack Beruga but is stopped and severely injured by robots.

The Elder again appears to him, saying that his mission is fulfilled and he may now die. Ark realizes he has been used by Dark Gaia (the "Devil"), whose world domination plans required Ark to resurrect the planet. Just as he is about to die, Kumari, a wise human who watched the world's growth through reincarnation, teleports Ark to safety. He then instructs him to go search the five Starstones and lay them at the grave at Time's End in order to call the Golden Child. Ark obtains the stones one after another and sets them into skull statues at Dryvale in the South Pole, where the final confrontation between God and the Devil once took place. This summons Ark's Lightside self; the person Dark Gaia used to create Ark himself. His Lightside self reveals to him that he, the underworld Ark, is the legendary hero and then kills him.

In the fourth and final chapter, "Resurrection of the Hero", Ark is reborn as a baby through the soul of the surface world, Light Gaia. He is kidnapped by Darkside Elle, led there by Yomi to eliminate a threat to Crysta. When she realizes this threat is actually Ark, she lets him awaken as the legendary hero and grow back into an adult. Yomi then decides to kill Ark by himself and reveals he has been working for Dark Gaia all along. Darkside Elle saves Ark by sacrificing herself to kill Yomi. Yomi is replaced by a "Light Version".

Ark goes and defeats Beruga; he then returns to the underworld to vanquish Dark Gaia, whose defeat brings forth the destruction of the Darkside. In the end, Ark realizes that as creations of Dark Gaia, he, the village of Crysta and the underworld, shall now vanish with the Devil's demise, though it is implied he and his loved ones in Crysta will reincarnate. He goes to sleep, after being told by Light Gaia that he as creator and defender, is what the humans would call a god. Ark's last dream pictures him as a bird flying above the world he helped exist, watching it grow older. An epilogue shows Lightside Elle at her original home answering a knock at the door.

== Development ==
Terranigma was developed by the Japanese company Quintet, which had previously designed creation-themed Super NES games such as ActRaiser and Soul Blazer. It is considered to be part of an unofficial trilogy with the games Illusion of Gaia and Soul Blazer. This series is nicknamed either "Quintet Trilogy", "Gaia Trilogy" or "Heaven and Earth Trilogy" (after Terranigma's Japanese title, which translates to "the creation of Heaven and Earth") by fans. In actuality, according to the producer of Enix USA, there is no connection between Soul Blazer and Gaia, but the former title is related to ActRaiser.

Publisher Enix commissioned the developers as a subcontractor and decided for the title to be an action role-playing game for strategic reasons, based on Quintet's experience in that particular genre and the good reception of their earlier games by Japanese players.

The theme of creation prevalent in Terranigma was introduced as a contrast to the destruction of enemies in other action titles, and to inspire the player's imagination concerning the effects their actions might have. The script was written by director and designer Tomoyoshi Miyazaki, the founder of Quintet, with the scenario provided by Reiko Takebayashi. Tatsuo Hashimoto created the computer graphics cover art and also rendered the background images for the resurrection scenes.

The music of Terranigma was composed by Miyoko Takaoka and Masanori Hikichi, the latter of whom was responsible for the design of the sounds as well. Yuzo Koshiro, who had previously composed the soundtrack for ActRaiser, contributed the music for the laboratory area, but did not get credited. The English scripts of the game used in the European and Australian releases by Nintendo were translated by Colin Palmer, Dan Owsen, Hiro Nakamura and Nob Ogasawara.

== Release ==
Terranigma was first previewed in mid-1995 and slated for an October launch window. Early previews prior to release showcased several differences compared to the final version such as the ability to climb the five towers outside using claws, different room layouts and plant decorations around the HUD. It was first released in Japan on October 20, 1995, by Enix for the Super Famicom under the name Tenchi Sōzō. The title was then released in Europe on December 19, 1996, by Nintendo. It was also released in Spain in April 1997 and in France on the summer of 1997. The game wound up never being published in North America because Enix had already closed its US subsidiary by the time the localization was finished.

Terranigma was released alongside several pieces of merchandise in Japan, including an official guide book, a world atlas, a novel by Saori Kumi, a novelization by Norio Nakai titled Logout Bunko Tenchi Sōzō, a gamebook featuring artwork by character designer Kamui Fujiwara, and the two-volume manga Gangan Fantasy Comics: Tenchi Sōzō by Mamiko Yasaka. Except for the guide book, none of these materials have been released outside Japan, though Club Nintendo published a 32-page comic illustrating scenes from the game up to the events of the third chapter in Germany. A Japanese soundtrack album titled Tenchi Sōzō Creative Soundtracks, with 33 compositions and six arranged tracks of the game's music, was released by Kitty Enterprises on October 25, 1995.

A petition by the game's Japanese fanbase, backed by artist Kamui Fujiwara and co-composer Miyoko Takaoka, began in July 2021 to either re-release or remaster Terranigma. This fan-led effort renewed speculation on the status of the rights to Quintet's games. According to Fujiwara, Quintet president Tomoyoshi Miyazaki had "disappeared" to his knowledge; he speculated this was why the rights to republish the game were complicated, that Miyazaki was not available for contact. In August 2026, Terranigma was announced for a re-release on modern platforms (PC; PlayStation 4 and 5; Xbox Series X/S; Nintendo Switch and Switch 2), slated for a 2027 launch.

== Reception ==
Reception

Aggregate score
Aggregator	Score
GameRankings	74.14%

Review scores
Publication	Score
Computer and Video Games	4/5
Famitsu	8/10, 7/10, 8/10, 7/10
HobbyConsolas	95%
Joypad	88%
M! Games	80%
Mega Fun	80%
Official Nintendo Magazine	90/100
Player One	90%
Total!	2+
Video Games (DE)	85%
Nintendo Acción	97%
The Super Famicom	78%
Super Play	88/100

Award
Publication	Award
Famitsu (1995)	Silver Hall of Fame

Terranigma garnered acclaim from critics. GameFan's Kei Kuboki described it as Quintet's "best (...) effort" and being "among the [Super NES's] most memorable titles". The game holds a 74.14% rating based on seven reviews at review aggregator GameRankings, and was given the "Silver Hall of Fame" award from Famitsu. It received a 23.3 out of 30 score in a public poll taken by Family Computer Magazine. Quintet reported that 200,000 copies were sold in Japan.

Famitsu's four reviewers gave Terranigma a score of 30 out of 40. Likewise, The Super Famicom's three reviewers gave it a 78 out of 100 scores. MAN!AC's Robert Bannert praised its atmospheric world, characters, stereo soundtrack, map design and sophisticated controls, regarding it as a good game in the Japanese action-adventure tradition. Total!'s Michael Anton commended its varied locations, soundtrack, ease of play, and plot but several aspects such as the difficulty level were criticized. Nevertheless, Anton recommended the title for fans of the action-adventure genre, stating that it would tide over fans until the release of Lufia II. Computer and Video Games's Paul Davies gave high remarks to its controls, artwork, music, presentation, and storytelling, regarding it as an outstanding addition to the SNES' action-adventure role-playing game library "with a powerful message". Mega Fun's Rene Schneider gave positive comments to the graphics, music, controls and technical performance but criticized the game's strategy guide for revealing many of the puzzles, lowering its fun factor.

Video Games' Jan Schweinitz regarded it as a "worthy successor" to Zelda III. Superjuegos's Marcos García also regarded Terranigma as one of the best and most ambitious action role-playing games for SNES, stating that it surpasses Illusion of Time and Secret of Evermore. García commended the Spanish translation, visual quality, graphical effects and epic soundtrack. Hobby Consolas's Roberto Lorente praised its mix of action and role-playing elements, stating that it surpasses Zelda while capturing its spirit. Lorente also gave high remarks to the Mode 7 maps, audio, controls and absorbing plot. Nintendo Acción's Javier Abad gave very positive comments to the varied scenery, carefully crafted plot involving secondary storylines and freedom of movement but criticized its dungeon maps. In November 1997, in its 60th monthly issue, Nintendo Acción listed it as the 11th best game they had ever reviewed. Joypad's Grégoire Hellot regarded the game to be interesting and entertaining, stating that "Zelda fans will be in for a treat". Player One's Christophe Pottier also stated that the game was excellent and "technically perfect" presentation-wise. Both Hellot and Pottier recognized the game's quality but panned its late French release date, stating that it should have been published before Final Fantasy VII.

=== Retrospective coverage ===
Terranigma continues to be regarded as one of the best action role-playing games of its era. RPGFan's Jeremy Tan considered it as "one of Enix's greatest Action RPG games ever", praising the fast-paced combat system, visual presentation, varied soundtrack and simple controls but lamented the lack of a North American release. 1Up.com's Jeremy Parish described it as Quintet's best-known Super Nintendo action-RPG, noting the quality of the gameplay, music and deep story themes. Nintendo Life's Corbie Dillard highly commended its easy-to-pick-up controls, graphics, emotional music score, sense of scale and evolving plot. Jeuxvideo.com's Zashy regarded its graphical effects as among the most beautiful on SNES while giving positive remarks to the playability, longevity, soundtrack and storyline. Zashy noted that its difficulty can put some players off but nevertheless claimed that "Terranigma will undoubtedly remain the title that marked the end of the reign of SNES in the most poetic way possible".

RPGamer's Mike Moehnke noted its narrative to be interesting on a consistent basis and praised the varied locations, fast combat system and audiovisual presentation but criticized the low difficulty level and unnecessary magic system. Moehnke also questioned the lack of a North American release but regarded Terranigma as "Quintet's final hurrah on the SNES" nevertheless. USgamer's Nadia Oxford concurred and expressed disappointment with the lack of an official North American release due to the closure of Enix's branch in the region and lack of a Virtual Console re-release but described its music as one of the best soundtracks on the SNES. Hardcore Gaming 101's David DiRienzo also agreed with the lack of a North American localization but regarded Terranigma as "the best of" both Soul Blazer and Illusion of Gaia, commending its less restrictive design, Zelda-style dungeon maps, refined gameplay mechanics and music score but criticized the inconsistent visual presentation, cumbersome magic system and certain aspects of its plot. Regardless, DiRienzo stated that the title was one of the better action RPGs on SNES.
