= Quintet (company) =

Japanese video game developer

Quintet Co., Ltd.
- Type: Public
- Industry: Video games
- Founded: April 1989
- Headquarters: Tokyo, Japan
- Key people: Tomoyoshi Miyazaki, Masaya Hashimoto
- Products: ActRaiser; ActRaiser 2; Illusion of Gaia; Robotrek; Soul Blazer; Terranigma
- Website: Archived official website

Quintet Co., Ltd. (株式会社クインテット, Kabushiki gaisha Kuintetto) is a Japanese video game developer founded in April 1989. The company name is derived from musical terminology, representing the five elements of game design: planning, graphics, sound, programming, and production. Quintet was most active during the 1990s, maintaining a strong relationship with Enix (now part of Square Enix). It was also a member of the GD-NET group of Sega Saturn developers. Quintet has not been active since the 2000s and is presumed to be defunct.

== Company overview ==
The director and president of Quintet is Tomoyoshi Miyazaki, the scenario writer for the first three entries of Nihon Falcom's Ys series. Masaya Hashimoto, who served as the main director, designer, and programmer for the same early Ys titles, also joined Quintet alongside Miyazaki. Thanks to the Ys connection, composer Yuzo Koshiro (also a Ys veteran) contributed to the score of the company's inaugural title, ActRaiser, a soundtrack that has since been adapted for orchestra. Koshiro's sister, Ayano Koshiro, created the character designs.

The releases of Soul Blazer, Illusion of Gaia, and Terranigma, also known as the "Soul Blazer Trilogy," were well-received by some fans for the broad philosophical and sometimes dark themes addressed in the titles. Quintet's games often revolve around a conflict between a being that brings destruction and a being that controls creation, symbolizing duality. The world has two aspects that both oppose and complement each other, with everything in existence built upon that relationship. The portrayal of suffering and sacrifice set Quintet's games apart from other titles of the era and left a lasting impression on fans.

The company appears to have been inactive since 2002. There was an active bulletin board on the official site until March 29, 2002 (the release date of the Game Boy Advance action RPG Magical Houshin, the counterpart to the GameCube title Battle Houshin, released as Mystic Heroes in North America). In response to comments from fans impatient with the lack of news, Quintet staff closed the bulletin board. Afterwards, the bulletin board was shut down. In March 2008, Quintet's website was also taken offline.

A fan-led effort to encourage a re-release or remaster of Terranigma in 2021 led to renewed speculation about the status of the rights to Quintet's games. According to Terranigma artist Kamui Fujiwara, Quintet president Tomoyoshi Miyazaki had "disappeared" to his knowledge; he speculated that this was the reason the rights to republish the game were complicated, as Miyazaki was not available for contact. According to Ryuichi Nakazawa, founder of Westone Bit Entertainment, Fujiwara was arrested for unknown reasons after moving to Giga Factory. A remaster of ActRaiser entitled ActRaiser Renaissance was released in September 2021 by Square Enix, suggesting that Square Enix has access to ActRaiser's rights, and possibly the rest of Quintet's library as well. In December 2023, Yuzo Koshiro directly urged Square Enix to bring Illusion of Gaia and Terranigma to modern platforms. A remaster of Terranigma is planned for a 2027 release, suggesting that Square Enix is able to release Quintet's games despite Miyazaki's absence.

== Games developed ==
Year	Title	Publisher	Platform(s)	Notes
1990	ActRaiser	Enix	Super Nintendo	
1992	Soul Blazer	Enix	Super Nintendo	
1993	ActRaiser 2	Enix	Super Nintendo	
1993	Illusion of Gaia	Enix	Super Nintendo	
1994	Robotrek	Enix	Super Nintendo	
1995	Terranigma	Enix	Super Nintendo	
1997	The Granstream Saga	Sony Computer Entertainment	PlayStation	Credited to Shade, an internal team
1998	Solo Crisis	Quintet	Sega Saturn	
1998	Code R	Quintet	Sega Saturn	
1999	Planet Laika	Enix	PlayStation	Co-developed with Zeque
1999	Brightis	Sony Computer Entertainment	PlayStation	
1999	Shenmue	Sega	Dreamcast	Developed by Sega AM2; Quintet credited with development support
1999	Godzilla Generations: Maximum Impact	Sega	Dreamcast	
2001	Simple 1500 Series vol.78 The Zeroyon	D3 Publisher	PlayStation	
2002	Magical Houshin	Koei	Game Boy Advance	
