= Illusion of Gaia =

1993 video game

- North American box art
- Developer: Quintet
- Publishers: JP: Enix; WW: Nintendo
- Director: Masaya Hashimoto
- Producer: Yasuyuki Sone
- Designer: Tomoyoshi Miyazaki
- Artist: Moto Hagio
- Writer: Mariko Ōhara
- Composer: Yasuhiro Kawasaki
- Platform: Super Nintendo Entertainment System
- Release: JP: November 27, 1993; NA: September 26, 1994; EU: June 21, 1995
- Genre: Action role-playing
- Mode: Single-player

Illusion of Gaia, (Note: Known in Japan as Gaia Gensōki (Japanese: ガイア幻想紀; lit. "The Gaia Fantasy Chronicle")) known in PAL territories as Illusion of Time, is an action role-playing video game developed by Quintet for the Super Nintendo Entertainment System. The game was released in Japan by Enix in 1993, and in North America and PAL territories by Nintendo in 1994 and 1995. Set in a fantasy reimagining of Earth, the game's plot centers on a boy named Will who is chosen to save the world from an impending disaster. Throughout the game, the player guides Will through levels inspired by the ancient ruins of real-world civilizations and Wonders of the World, including the Great Pyramid and the Great Wall of China.

== Gameplay ==
Although Illusion of Gaia features a large cast of characters, only Will, Freedan, and Shadow are playable. Each character has unique abilities, and certain areas can only be accessed by specific character. The characters acquire new skills as part of the story progression. Will's techniques primarily focus on accessing new areas with incidental combat applications, while Freedan's are more combat-oriented. Shadow joins the party later in the game.

Combat is relatively straightforward. Characters share the same health and defense scores but have varying levels of attack strength. Freedan inflicts more damage than Will and has a longer reach, while Shadow deals more damage than Freedan. Attacks are primarily melee-based, utilizing Will's flute, Freedan's sword, or Shadow's pseudopod. Enemies' health bars are displayed upon attacking, appearing as a series of red spheres that represent hit points. Bosses cannot be revisited, and enemies reappear only when Will loses all his lives or exits an area and returns.

Will at a Dark Space, with Gaia (center) and statues of Will's alter egos: Freedan (left) and Shadow (right). Dark Space also serves as a save point for players.

Illusion of Gaia does not employ experience points; when the player defeats all enemies in a room, Will receives a jewel that grants a permanent increase in attack, defense, or health power. Although returning to a previously cleared area will cause enemies to reappear, the bonuses for defeating them again do not apply. When an enemy is defeated, it may drop a gold sphere worth a certain number of life points. If Will dies with 100 or more points, the player resumes play at the start of the current stage instead of losing outright.

Illusion of Gaia lacks a currency or equipment system. There is only one healing item (herbs), which are scarce. Unlike most games of its type, previously visited areas cannot be revisited, except in the last third of the game. The only side quest, collecting all the Red Jewels, cannot be completed if the player fails to find some before advancing the story.

Illusion of Gaia features a fixed difficulty setting. Saving occurs at Dark Spaces, which can be found in both combat and non-combat areas. Will can recover lost health within the Dark Spaces and may occasionally switch forms or gain abilities.

== Plot ==
=== Setting ===
Illusion of Gaia is set in a version of Earth that is partially historical but primarily fantasy-based. The game features several real-world locations, such as Incan ruins, the Nazca Lines, Angkor Wat, the Great Wall of China, and the Egyptian pyramids. Each of these ruins holds a piece of the final puzzle, which is revealed in the legendary Tower of Babel.

The story takes place during the Age of Exploration, roughly corresponding to the 16th century, with references to figures like Christopher Columbus. Explorers seek ancient ruins, along with their treasures and secrets. Many return empty-handed, and some are never seen again. Will, the protagonist of the game, is the sole survivor of one such expedition. He accompanied his father, a renowned explorer, on a maritime journey to uncover the secrets of the Tower of Babel. The expedition encountered a mysterious disaster, and although Will managed to return to his hometown, he has no recollection of how he survived.

=== Story ===
When the game begins, Will stumbles into a "Dark Space", where he encounters a being named Gaia, who possesses a human face and a tentacled body. Gaia informs Will that he must leave his home to save the world from an impending evil. A comet is approaching, bringing ill fortune to the world. As he journeys onward, Will gains the ability to transform into two additional forms, each with its own powers: the dark knight Freedan and Shadow, a solid manifestation of energy.

Later, the comet is revealed to be an ancient weapon from the last Blazer War, possessing the power to reshape the world. In the ruins of Angkor Wat, Will discovers that the comet's previous approaches have disrupted the evolution of the world.

Will and his companions travel the globe to collect artifacts known as Mystic Statues. At the climax, Will and Kara reach the Tower of Babel, where Will is revealed to be the Dark Knight and Kara the Light Knight. The two knights unite to form Shadow and utilize the ancient statues to unleash the ultimate power, the firebird.

As the comet arrives, it manifests as Dark Gaia. Will and Kara succeed in destroying its power, restoring the world to normalcy. The spirits of Will's parents inform Will and Kara that the world will return to its natural state and that neither of them will retain any memories of their adventure. Saddened by this realization, Will and Kara unite one last time to form Shadow and return to Earth.

The final scene is ambiguous. Will's friends are depicted in what appears to be a modern-day school, suggesting that even if they have forgotten their time together, they remain friends in the "real" world.

== Development and release ==
Illusion of Gaia was scored by Yasuhiro Kawasaki. Moto Hagio is credited with the character designs, while novelist Mariko Ōhara contributed to the story.

The game is often regarded as part of an unofficial trilogy alongside two other Quintet titles, Soul Blazer (1992) and Terranigma (1995). In actuality, according to the producer of Enix USA, "there is no connection in the universe between SoulBlazer and Gaia. SoulBlazer is actually related to ActRaiser".

The game was released for the Super Nintendo Entertainment System, debuting in Japan on November 27, 1993, and in North America on September 26, 1994. Developed by Quintet, the game was published in Japan by Enix and worldwide by Nintendo.

=== Prototype ===
A pre-release English-language version of Illusion of Gaia was leaked onto the internet as a ROM file. This pre-release version differed in presentation and translation from the final English-language version. For example, the prototype featured a different title screen based on the original Japanese title screen, showcasing small sprites of the game's main characters running across the surface of a comet. The final version released in the United States included an instruction booklet with an image of an early title screen, which also displayed the small sprites at the bottom, albeit with the correct title. In the leaked prototype, the title was presented as SoulBlazer: Illusion of GAIA.

Another notable difference was that many of the original Japanese names appeared in the English-language pre-release version. For instance, the character "Will" was referred to as "Tim", and "Kara" was named "Karen" (one instance of this name remained in the final release).

Some of the script in the English-language prototype varied from the final version, with one example being the character "Jeweler Gem", who was portrayed as more "sinister".

Finally, Nintendo was not credited in the pre-release version's title screen. It is believed that the prototype was developed before Nintendo of America decided to publish and market the game in the United States. Once Nintendo agreed to serve as the U.S. publisher, the title was changed, and a logo was specifically redesigned to resemble the branding of Nintendo's popular The Legend of Zelda franchise.

== Version differences ==
In accordance with Nintendo of America's censorship policies at the time of publication, several changes were made to the game to mitigate certain darker story elements. Most notably, the native tribe encountered near Angkor Wat was originally depicted as cannibals, with skeletal remains scattered around the village representing the remnants of their own tribesmen whom they had consumed to survive.

Religious references were modified or removed entirely. Will's school was initially overseen by a priest and held within a Christian church. The American release merely identifies the building as a school and replaces the cross with a statue. In the Japanese version, speaking with the priest prompts Will to recite a prayer. In contrast, the American version has the teacher leading Will in reciting a poem. A translation error in a sequence near the middle of the game suggests that Seth's consciousness has been absorbed into a sea monster named "Riverson", a mistranslation of "Leviathan" caused by confusion between R and L. Additionally, a line from the game's climax, where Will and Kara remark, upon seeing Earth from outer space, that this must be what it feels like to be God, was also removed.

A significant gameplay alteration is that the Japanese and American releases feature different bosses in the Sky Garden. In the Japanese version, the boss is depicted as a giant bird, while in the American release, it is a winged Babylonian statue with talons. It is suggested that the American boss aligns more closely with the creators' initial vision and relates to the idea that the Sky Garden was once the Hanging Gardens of Babylon. The developers took the opportunity presented by the port to "tidy up" the boss, as they were dissatisfied with the bird-snake hybrid used in the original release.

In Europe, the game was released as Illusion of Time in English, German, French, and Spanish. Of these, only the French version underwent significant changes, incorporating references to existing people or myths, such as Edgar Degas, Franz Kafka, Chrysaor, and Nosferatu.

=== Merchandise ===
Nintendo released a bundle pack in the United States that, while supplies lasted, included a "one size fits all" T-shirt featuring the game's logo alongside characters Freedan and Shadow. As a Nintendo-published title in the U.S., the game received special attention in Nintendo Power magazine, and additional merchandise was available for purchase in the Super Power Supplies catalog for subscribers.

== Reception ==
Reception

Aggregate score
Aggregator	Score
GameRankings	80.17%

Review scores
Publication	Score
Computer and Video Games	90/100
Famitsu	8/10, 6/10, 7/10
Game Players	82%
GamesMaster	90%
Hyper	86%
Nintendo Power	3.675/5
Official Nintendo Magazine	91/100, 88/100
Super Play	88%
Total!	(UK) 86/100 (DE) 2-
Electronic Games	B
Games World	90/100
Hippon Super!	9/10
Super Gamer	90/100
Ultimate Future Games	78%
VideoGames	7/10

Awards
Publication	Award
GameFan Megawards	Action/RPG Game of the Year
VideoGames	2nd Best Adventure Game
Nintendo Power	186th Best Game of All Time

Illusion of Gaia received a 23.9/30 score in a readers' poll conducted by Super Famicom Magazine. The game received generally favorable reception from critics, holding a rating of 80.17% based on nine reviews according to review aggregator GameRankings.

GamePro's Peteroo praised the game's puzzle-solving elements, effect-heavy graphics, eclectic soundtrack and gentle difficulty slope. They added that "the game, however, has sacrificed the central theme that gave the original Soulblazer [sic] (and ActRaiser before it) a distinct sense of direction and purpose—an impression that your good works have an ongoing impact on the game world. On the other hand, Illusion of Gaia enjoys a sense of worldliness that Soulblazer [sic] didn't have. ... you never know quite what's coming next, and that's the best thing that could be said about an RPG". Game Zero Magazine's Bryan Carter commended the game's visuals, and play control, but found its soundscapes average. Carter also complained about the puzzle aspect, stating that "These are NOT puzzles by any stretch of the imagination, but are more an excercise [sic] of frustration control".

=== Sales and accolades ===
Quintet reported that Illusion of Gaia sold 650,000 copies worldwide, with 200,000 copies sold in Japan, 300,000 copies sold in North America, and 150,000 copies sold in Europe. Illusion of Gaia was rated the 186th best game made on a Nintendo system in Nintendo Power's Top 200 Games list in 2006. In 2018, Complex ranked Illusion of Gaia 86th on their "The Best Super Nintendo Games of All Time". In 1995, Total! rated the game 41st in their Top 100 SNES Games, complimenting the graphics and gameplay. IGN ranked Illusion of Gaia 74th on their "Top 100 SNES Games of All Time".
