= ActRaiser =

1990 video game

- North American Super NES cover art
- Developer: Quintet
- Publisher: Enix
- Director: Masaya Hashimoto
- Producer: Yasuyuki Sone
- Designer: Ayano Koshiro
- Writer: Tomoyoshi Miyazaki
- Composer: Yuzo Koshiro
- Series: ActRaiser
- Platforms: Super Nintendo Entertainment System, Mobile phone
- Release: Super NES: JP: December 16, 1990; NA: November 1991; EU: March 18, 1993; Mobile phone: EU: September 1, 2004
- Genres: Platform, city-building, action RPG
- Mode: Single-player

ActRaiser (Note: Japanese: アクトレイザー, Hepburn: Akutoreizā) is a 1990 video game developed by Quintet and published by Enix for the Super Nintendo Entertainment System. It combines traditional side-scrolling platforming and sections with city building elements. A sequel, ActRaiser 2, was released for the Super NES in 1993. In 2007, ActRaiser became available on the Wii's Virtual Console download service in Europe, North America, and Japan. A version of the game was also released for European mobile phones in 2004. A remake, Actraiser Renaissance, was released for several platforms in 2021.

== Gameplay ==
One of the side-scrolling stages, showing a boss battle against the manticore in the town of Bloodpool

The player plays as "The Master", the main protagonist of the game. Although the Master is never directly controlled, the player interacts with the world by controlling an angel and an animated statue. The player plays as an angel during the simulation sequences of the game, and as the statue during the action sequences.

The overhead-view simulation mode involves protecting and guiding the Master's new civilization towards prosperity, beginning with two humans. This portion of the game requires the player to take actions that encourage the growth of the population, including road planning and using lightning, rain, sunlight, wind, and earthquakes as miracles. The Angel can interact with the monsters in the area by shooting them with arrows as well as aid the Master by indicating where to build and use miracles.

One obstacle in the simulation mode is the presence of flying monsters that attempt to impede the progression of a civilization. The monsters originate from four lairs around the region at the beginning of each level. They continuously spawn the creatures as the servant kills them. As the population expands, it can seal the lairs of monsters, which prevents them from spawning, and eventually eliminate all the flying monsters in the land. Doing so increases the civilization level of the region, allowing more advanced structures to be built and increasing the potential population. Once all four lairs have been sealed the population will begin to build the most advanced homes available to the people in that region. The Master levels up by increasing the total population of the world, granting an increase in hit points and SP, used in performing miracles.

Each area has two side-scrolling action sequences, one before the building simulation and near the end. In the action sequences, the player controls a humanlike statue brought to life by the Master. The player must jump from platform to platform while defeating monsters to accrue a score. At the end of each action sequence, the player must defeat a boss.

The final level is an action-sequence boss marathon, culminating in the final fight against Tanzra.

== Plot ==
The plot follows a godlike being known only as "The Master" (God in the Japanese version) in his fight against Tanzra (Satan in the Japanese version), also referred to as "The Evil One". According to the instruction booklet, The Master was defeated in a battle with Tanzra and his six lieutenants. The Master retreated to his sky palace to tend to his wounds and fell into a deep sleep. In the Master's absence, Tanzra divided the world into six lands, one for each of his lieutenants; they later turned the people to evil.

After several hundred years, the Master awakens fully recovered to discover that he has lost his powers due to the lack of belief in him. As the game progresses, the Master defeats Tanzra's lieutenants and recovers his powers by rebuilding the civilizations of his people and communicating with them through prayer. After all lieutenants have been slain, the Master commences an assault on Tanzra's stronghold, Death Heim, eventually defeating him.

After the defeat of Tanzra, The Master and his servant revisit the many civilizations that they had helped to build and observe the people. During their observations, they note that nobody is at the temple worshiping the Master. The servant observes that, although the people once prayed to the Master in times of trouble, they no longer feel a need to because they are able to solve their remaining problems on their own. The Master and his servant then enter the sky palace and depart into the heavens to await a time when they may be needed.

== Development ==
=== Religious subtext ===
The game is seen as an allegory for Judeo-Christian monotheism. In the original Japanese version, the protagonist's name is God and the antagonist is referred to as Satan. According to Douglas Crockford's Expurgation of Maniac Mansion, Nintendo of America had a strict policy regarding game content in the early 1990s, especially in regards to material that could be deemed offensive, a blanket category that prohibited the inclusion of any overtly religious themes or plotlines in a game. Hence, the main character of the game was renamed "The Master", although the allegory remains, as he travels the globe in a palace on a cloud, accompanied by an angel; slays demons; creates life; performs miracles; and is prayed to by the populace of the world. The bosses are based on real-world religion or mythology, such as Greek mythology and Hinduism. The concept of religion is further explored at the end of the game, when the Angel and "Master" discover that the temples of the world have become empty, people having lost their concept of faith and need for a deity now that they had been given all they needed to solve problems on their own. They leave the planet, to come back if needed.

=== Version differences ===
Further changes were made for the game's North American release. The game's title was slightly changed to ActRaiser, with a new logo. Monster Lairs were now indicated by skull-like symbols (changed from Stars of David). Action segments possess an overall easier level design, enemies were given new attacks, spells require less magic to cast, spike pits do not instantly kill the player, and more time is given to finish each segment. Meanwhile, the simulation segments have been made difficult and is difficult to reach the maximum experience level in this version. Finally, there is a "Professional!" mode, unlocked after completing the game, containing only the action segments with a level design similar to the original Japanese release.

European releases use changes from the North American version as a base. The Professional! mode, now called the "Action" mode, is available from the start. Both the original "Story" mode and this Action mode now have three difficulties. The action segments in the Normal and Expert settings for Story mode resemble the action segments from the previous North American and Japanese main modes respectively, while the new Beginner setting is even easier than Normal. The Normal setting for Action mode resembles the North American Professional! mode. Beginner mode resembles the North American main mode, though the new enemy attacks from the North American version of the game have been removed for both. The new Expert setting goes beyond any other version of the game, restoring the new attacks, increasing damage from enemies, and reducing damage dealt.

=== Ports ===
A modified version of the game was made for the Nintendo Super System arcade platform. This arcade version featured only the action stages, similar to the Professional! mode in the retail version. Among other changes, the game had a different scoring system, and was much more difficult than the retail version: for example, contact with spikes is instantly fatal to the player like in the Japanese version, instead of merely causing loss of HP.

Square Enix released a limited version of the game for mobile phones, published by Macrospace on September 1, 2004. It consists of the first three side-scrolling levels of the game, with the town-building portions completely omitted.

ActRaiser also became available on the Wii's Virtual Console. It was released in Japan on March 20, 2007, in Europe on April 13, and in North America on May 28. As the game was published by Enix, Square Enix currently holds the rights to the Virtual Console edition.

=== Actraiser Renaissance ===
A remake under the title of Actraiser Renaissance was released in September 2021, for Android, iOS, Nintendo Switch, PlayStation 4, and Windows. It drastically alters the flow of gameplay, with extra input commands in the action stages, and new tower defense segments in the simulator maps. It also introduces a post-game stage not present in the original game, Alcaleone.

== Music ==
Among many things, the game is recognized for its score, which was composed by Yuzo Koshiro. Its release within six months of the launch of the console demonstrated the compositional potential it represented to future projects, underscoring its ability to use and manipulate comparatively high-quality samples. A single disc soundtrack for the game was released on January 25, 1991, in Japan. A shorter arranged soundtrack titled Symphonic Suite from Actraiser was released on September 21. In 2004, a medley of music from the game arranged by the original composer was performed live at the second annual Symphonic Game Music Concert in Leipzig, Germany. The soundtrack was re-released by Wayô Records on vinyl and CD in 2021 as ActRaiser Original Soundtrack & Symphonic Suite. Koshiro would later return to not only fully recreate the original soundtrack for Actraiser Renaissance, but also composed fifteen new tracks, in both the original SNES sample quality and Renaissance's own higher quality audio.

== Reception ==
Reception

Aggregate score
Aggregator	Score
GameRankings	79.25%

Review scores
Publication	Score
Computer and Video Games	95%
Electronic Gaming Monthly	9/10, 8/10, 9/10, 8/10; 9/10, 9/10, 9/10, 9/10
Famitsu	6/10, 7/10, 7/10, 6/10
Game Informer	7/10
Games-X	91%
Super Play	90%
Total!	(UK) 91% (DE) 2+
VideoGames & Computer Entertainment	10/10
Control	70% 79%
Game Boy	4/5, 4/5, 3/5, 4/5, 3/5
Game Zone	74/100
Hippon Super!	6/10
Mean Machines	91%
SNES Force	87%
Super Action	90%
The Super Famicom	81/100
Super Gamer	84%
Super Pro	91/1000

The Japanese publication Micom BASIC Magazine ranked ActRaiser eighth in popularity in its March 1991 issue, and it received a 23.68/30 score in a 1993 readers' poll conducted by Super Famicom Magazine, ranking among Super Famicom titles at the number 26 spot. The game received generally favorable reception from critics, holding a rating of 79.25% based on eight reviews according to review aggregator GameRankings. Super Gamer called it a brilliant mix of a strategic gods game and platforming elements.

ActRaiser was awarded Best Music of 1993 by Electronic Gaming Monthly. In 1997 Electronic Gaming Monthly editors ranked it the 75th best console video game of all time. They praised the unique combination of gameplay styles and its hypnotic atmosphere that makes playing the game seem more like a religious experience than other games on Super NES.

=== Sales and accolades ===
Quintet reported that ActRaiser sold 620,000 copies worldwide, with 400,000 copies sold in Japan, 180,000 copies sold in North America, and 40,000 copies sold in Europe. ActRaiser was inducted into GameSpot's Greatest Games of All Time in December 2003. It was rated the 150th best game made on a Nintendo System in Nintendo Power's Top 200 Games list. In 2007, ScrewAttack ranked ActRaiser #1 on their "Top 10 Big Names That Fell Off", which listed games that were popular in days past, whether good or bad, but have since faded into relative obscurity (ActRaiser was discussed positively). It was also #10 in their "Top 20 SNES Games" list. In 2018, Complex ranked ActRaiser 33rd on their "The Best Super Nintendo Games of All Time" list. In 2017, Gamesradar ranked ActRaiser 23rd on its "The best SNES games of all time" list. They praised the gameplay, calling it a good mix of 2D action and city-building simulation. In 1995, Total! placed the game 91st on its "Top 100 SNES Games" list.
