= Enix =

Japanese video game publisher

Enix Corporation
- Native name: 株式会社エニックス
- Romanized name: Kabushiki gaisha Enikkusu
- Formerly: Eidansha Boshu Service Center Co., Ltd. (1975–1989)
- Type: Kabushiki gaisha
- Industry: Video games; Publishing; Anime; Manga
- Founded: September 22, 1975; 50 years ago
- Founder: Yasuhiro Fukushima
- Defunct: April 1, 2003; 23 years ago
- Fate: Merged with Square
- Successor: Square Enix
- Headquarters: Shibuya, Tokyo, Japan
- Key people: Yasuhiro Fukushima (CEO); Keiji Honda (president)
- Products: List of Enix games; List of Enix home computer games
- Operating income: ¥7,459 million (March 2002)
- Net income: ¥ 4,276 million (March 2002)
- Number of employees: 134 (March 2002)
- Subsidiaries: See Company structure and affiliates
- Website: www.enix.co.jp

Enix Corporation (Note: Japanese: 株式会社エニックス, Hepburn: Kabushiki gaisha Enikkusu) was a Japanese multimedia publisher which handled and oversaw video games, manga, guidebooks, and merchandise. It was founded in 1975 by Yasuhiro Fukushima as Eidansha Boshu Service Center, initially as a tabloid publisher and later attempting to branch into real estate management.

In 1982, a subsidiary of Eidansha Boshu named Enix began publishing video games for home computers. Notable early collaborators were designers Yuji Horii and Koichi Nakamura, and composer Koichi Sugiyama. All three worked on the 1986 role playing video game (RPG) Dragon Quest for the Family Computer. Dragon Quest was one of the earliest successful RPGs for consoles, spawning a franchise of the same name which remains Enix's best-known product. In 1989, the parent company was itself renamed Enix and absorbed the subsidiary.

Enix would gain notoriety as a publisher for several studios including tri-Ace, Tose, Chunsoft and Quintet. It also founded the Gangan Comics imprint family, and created international subsidiaries or partnerships related to technology development, publishing, and education.

In the early 2000s, due to rising game development costs, Enix entered discussions about merging with Square, a rival company known for the Final Fantasy franchise. The merger eventually went ahead in 2003 forming Square Enix, with Enix as the surviving corporate entity.

== History ==
=== 1975–1989: Origins, Dragon Quest ===
Enix was founded under the name Eidansha Boshu Service Center on September 22, 1975 by Yasuhiro Fukushima. An architect-turned-business entrepreneur, Fukushima initially founded Eidansha as a publishing company focused on advertising tabloids for real estate.

On February 5, 1980, Eidansha Boshu created a wholly owned subsidiary Eidansya Fudousan for the purpose of specializing in real estate trading and brokerage. Eidansya Fudousan was renamed Eidansha Systems in 1981. After Eidansha Boshu made an unsuccessful attempt to become a nationwide chain the following year, Fukushima decided to invest his capital into the emerging video game market. During this period, Eidansha Systems was renamed Enix Corporation on August 30, 1982. The name Enix was a play on both the mythological Phoenix, and the early computer ENIAC.

Seeking game proposals, Fukushima organized a competition dubbed the "Enix Game Hobby Program Contest" in both computer and manga magazines, offering a prize of ¥1 million (US$10,000) for a game prototype which could be published by Enix. Among the winners were Yuji Horii, then a writer for Weekly Shōnen Jump, with the sports game Love Match Tennis; designer Koichi Nakamura with the puzzle game Door Door; and self-trained programmer Kazuro Morita with the simulation video game Morita's Battlefield. During the next few years, Enix would publish titles for both the PC market and the fledgling Japanese console market. Using his royalties, Morita established the developer Random House and developed several PC and console titles including the Morita's Shogi series. In collaboration with Nakamura's new company Chunsoft, Horii notably created the adventure game The Portopia Serial Murder Case (1983), then during discussions around a port of the game to the Famicom (Nintendo Entertainment System) Horii and Nakamura decided to develop a role-playing video game (RPG) for the platform.

The RPG, titled Dragon Quest, began development in 1985. Horii and Nakamura acted as designers, composer Koichi Sugiyama created the score for the game, and Dragon Ball artist Akira Toriyama was brought on board for art design. While meeting with initially slow sales, Dragon Quest became a critical and commercial success, selling over one million copies in Japan. The success of Dragon Quest spawned a franchise of the same name, which would become Enix's highest-grossing property. Horii, Sugiyama and Toriyama remained mainstays with the series. Chunsoft developed the next five Dragon Quest titles. While the Dragon Quest series proved successful, Enix continued publishing PC titles to maintain financial stability. The company also began selling merchandise themed after Dragon Quest in 1988 with character statues and toys, expanding to board and card games the following year.

In October 1983, Enix co-founded Konishiroku Enix with Konishiroku Photo Company, later purchasing all shares in January 1989. A second subsidiary, Enix Products, was established in March 1988 for the sale of publications and character merchandise. Both subsidiaries along with the original Enix were merged in April 1989 into their parent company Eidansha Boshu which renamed itself Enix Corporation.

=== 1990–1999: Publishing and collaborations ===
In 1990, Enix published its first third-party console title ActRaiser for the Super Famicom. The game was developed by Quintet, a Japanese independent developer made up of former Nihon Falcom staff. Enix acted as publisher for all of Quintet's subsequent Super Famicom games in Japan. Enix had begun publishing guidebooks for the Dragon Quest series, between 1988 and 1991 the company decided to make print publication of its second major business section alongside video game publishing. This was to ensure income did not entirely depend on Dragon Quest. This eventually led to Enix launching the Gangan Comics imprint family, beginning with Monthly Shonen Gangan March 1991. Following its first publication with Monthly Shonen Gangan in March 1991, several other manga imprints with magazine and tankōbon editions were created for different genres including Monthly G-Fantasy and Monthly Shonen Gag-OU. The company also expanded merchandise range to include other notable series including Mario and Pokémon. In February 1991, Enix registered with the Japan Securities Dealers Association to offer shares for public purchase.

Following Dragon Quest V (1992), Chunsoft left as main series developer, wanting to create its own titles. In the years following, Chunsoft continued collaborating with Enix on spin-off Dragon Quest titles including early entries in the Mystery Dungeon franchise. The next two entries were developed by Heartbeat, a company founded by former Chunsoft staff dedicated to developing Dragon Quest titles. Heartbeat would handle main series production until going on sabbatical in 2002. From 1994, Enix acted as publisher for Horii's Itadaki Street series, taking over the series from ASCII. It also frequently acted as publisher for titles from Tamtam, and created the Dragon Quest Monsters spin-off series with developer Tose.

Enix were initially pitched unsuccessfully by Wolf Team with Tales of Phantasia, which was ultimately published by Namco in 1995. Enix later acted as publisher for Star Ocean (1996), developed by former Tales of Phantasia staff members who split from Wolf Team to form tri-Ace. In partnership with Enix, tri-Ace developed three further Star Ocean titles, and the Norse mythology-inspired RPG Valkyrie Profile (1999). Enix also notably helped publish two Western console titles; Riven (1998) and Tomb Raider III (1999). In August 1996, Enix moved from Shinjuku to offices in Shibuya. In contrast to other companies at the time, which were leaving behind cartridge-based Nintendo 64 for the disc-based PlayStation, Enix announced in 1997 it would publish titles for both platforms. It later stated its intention to develop for the GameCube. In August 1999, Enix was listed on Tokyo Stock Exchange's first section, which includes the largest companies on the exchange.

=== 2000–2003: Internal troubles, merger ===
Beginning in the early 2000s, Enix's manga publishing division went through a period of turbulence as several editors expressed dissatisfaction with Enix's focus on Dragon Quest media and the shōnen demographic, a growing lack of creative freedom, and rising tensions between authors and editors. Editor Yoshihiro Hosaka and a number of other Gangan associates founded Mag Garden in 2001, which became a market rival through the Monthly Comic Blade magazine. Mag Garden's foundation triggered a mass departure of creatives and legal battles with Enix over manga copyright ownership. The issues were resolved in 2003 when Enix agreed to partially invest in Mag Garden. The manga division's troubles were lessened with the beginning of Fullmetal Alchemist, which proved highly popular. Enix also suffered from financial losses due to the delayed releases of Dragon Quest VII (2000) and Dragon Quest Monsters 2 (2001). Some notable titles begun or announced during the 2000s were PlayStation 2 titles in the Grandia series, the MMORPG Fantasy Earth: The Ring of Dominion from Puraguru, and the action role-playing game Drakengard from Cavia.

In 2001, citing the rising cost of game development, Enix expressed interest in merging with either Square or Namco. Ultimately, talks began with Square, a market rival and developer of the Final Fantasy franchise. Talks were temporarily halted when Square suffered financially due to the failure of the 2001 feature film Final Fantasy: The Spirits Within. Following the commercial success of Final Fantasy X (2001) and Kingdom Hearts (2002), talks went ahead on the merger with Enix as Square's finances stabilized; Square's then-CEO Yoichi Wada described it as a merger of two companies "at their height". Despite this, some shareholders had doubts about the merger, notably Square's founder Masafumi Miyamoto, who would find himself holding significantly less shares and having a smaller controlling stake if the deal went ahead as initially planned. Miyamoto's issue was resolved by altering the exchange ratio to one Square share for 0.85 Enix shares, and the merger was greenlit. The merger resulted in Square Enix being formed on April 1, 2003, with Enix as the surviving corporate entity and Square dissolving its departments and subsidiaries into the new company. Enix's last two published titles were Star Ocean: Till the End of Time and Dragon Quest Monsters: Caravan Heart, both in 2003. Fantasy Earth and Drakengard were published after the merger.

== Company structure and affiliates ==
During reports on the merger with Square, Takashi Oya of Deutsche Securities described Enix as "[outsourcing] game development and [having] few in-house creators" compared to Square's focus on internal development. At the time of the merger, Enix had two development divisions; one managing the Dragon Quest series led by Yuu Miyake, and a supervisory division made up of producers. Speaking in 1997, Quintet staff described their company as a "subcontractor" for Enix, being involved in its projects even when not acting as a publisher. Horii notably created Armor Project as a company to oversee Dragon Quest for Enix, with him comparing the relationship to that between an editor and an artist. Armor Project survived as an associate of Square Enix, growing into a larger entity over the years.

Enix Webstar Network Technology (Beijing) Co., Ltd. was a company formed between Enix and Mauritius Webstar Inc. in 2001 to develop online and mobile phone games in China and, later, other parts of Asia. The subsidiary was carried over after the merger between Square and Enix, but was dissolved in 2005 after the establishment of Square Enix China. Digital Entertainment Academy Co., Ltd. was established as a partially owned subsidiary in 1991. Originally called Toshima Ku Hokkaido University, the school was founded to teach game development.

Enix America Corporation was the corporation's first American localization subsidiary based in Redmond, Washington. It was established in 1989 after the release of Dragon Warrior by Nintendo of America in 1989. A notable member was Robert Jerauld, who left Nintendo to join Enix America Corporation as a game counselor before eventually becoming producer. While some titles met with commercial success, Jerauld noted that market saturation meant several localized releases saw low sales. One of the games published, King Arthur & the Knights of Justice, was Enix's first and only North America exclusive game: Jerauld recalled that he and others at the company wanted to branch into game development alongside publishing. Enix America Corp was ultimately shut down in November 1995 when the parent company decided to no longer release products in North America. Jerault later elaborated that Enix America Corporation's close was due to the combination of low North American sales, and Enix's re-evaluation of their publishing strategy as Nintendo prepared their next console.

Enix America, Inc., Enix's last American localization subsidiary, was organized in 1999, and was based in Seattle, Washington. Paul Handelman, who was part of Enix America Corporation's staff, returned to lead Enix America, Inc. as president. The corporation was in existence until 2003, ceasing to exist after the merger with Square Co., Ltd. Several of Enix's localized games were published by other companies including Nintendo and Sony Computer Entertainment.

== Legacy ==
The Dragon Quest series became one of the most popular video game series in Japan, spinning off into a multimedia franchise, and entering mainstream popular culture in the country. Several publications have cited the original game as a pioneer for the genre on home consoles, influencing the development of other popular series. Enix's Gangan Comics imprint, in addition to publishing a number of successful series, was credited by critic Tsuyoshi Ito with helping manga appeal to a wider cross-demographic audience that blending the shōnen and shōjo manga styles. Hosaka also credited Enix with introducing fantasy into the wider mainstream market, and as a pioneer of publishers directly investing in and having creative input into anime adaptations of their work.
