= Twerking =

Type of dance primarily involving the buttocks

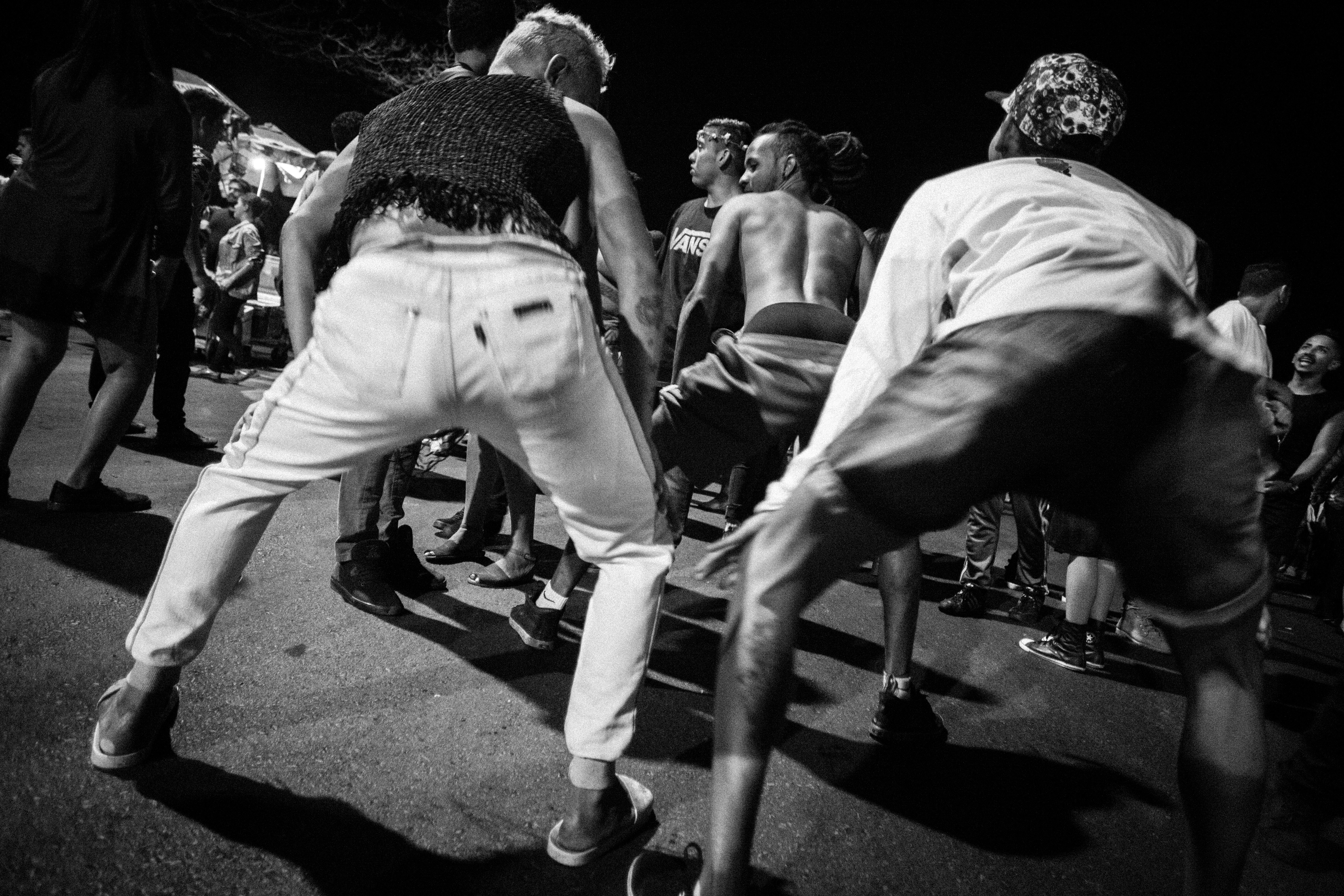
Participants at the Brasília Pride event twerking

Twerking (/ˈtwɜːrkɪŋ/; possibly a blend of "twitch" and "jerk" or from 'to work') is a type of dance where participants throw or thrust the hips back or shake the buttocks, often in a low squatting stance. It is performed chiefly, but not exclusively, by women.

Twerking's origins lay in West and Central Africa, where traditional dances such as Mapouka from the Ivory Coast and other related pelvic dances emphasized expressive hip and buttock isolations in ceremonial, celebratory, and social settings. These traditions were later tethered and appropriated by New World populations like Haitians in Kole mabouya or Americans in the New Orleans bounce scene in the late 1980s and early 1990s.

Twerking is part of a larger set of characteristic moves "unique" to the New Orleans style of hip-hop known as "bounce". Moves include "mixing", "exercising", the "bend over", the "shoulder hustle", "clapping", "booty clapping", "booty poppin", "the sleeper" and "the wild wood"—all recognized as booty shaking or bounce. Twerking is one among other types of choreographic gestures within bounce.

As a tradition shaped by the Socal Aid and Pleasure Clubs, nightclubs, block parties and second line parades of New Orleans, the dance was central to "a historical situating of sissy bounce—bounce music as performed by artists from the New Orleans African-American community that [led to] a meteoric rise in popularity post-[Hurricane Katrina after 2005]." In the 1990s, twerking had widespread appeal in Black party culture throughout the hip-hop/rap region known as The Dirty South, including New Orleans, Houston, Memphis, Charlotte, Virginia Beach, Miami, and Atlanta. In the 2010s, twerking became more known to global audiences through social media, particularly after it was adopted by popular music artist Miley Cyrus in her performance at the 2013 MTV Video Music Awards.

The Oxford English Dictionary defines twerking as dancing "in a sexually provocative manner, using thrusting movements of the bottom and hips while in a low, squatting stance", and Merriam-Webster gives the definition: "[a] sexually suggestive dancing characterized by rapid, repeated hip thrusts and shaking of the buttocks especially while squatting". However, some have disputed the inherently sexual nature of twerking, arguing that the dance's recent stigmatisation is a result of gender expectations in contemporary society.

(video) Backup dancers twerking at a 2015 Pharrell Williams concert in Japan

== Etymology ==
A 2013 Oxford Dictionaries blog post states, "the most likely theory is that it is an alteration of 'work', because that word has a history of being used in similar ways, with dancers being encouraged to 'work it'". Local bounce practitioners attribute the term to a contraction of "to work" ("t'work"; or, spelled as it is pronounced, "twerk").

The Oxford English Dictionary defines an early 19th-century use of the word as a blend of "twist" (or "twitch") and "jerk", which was reported by the BBC in conjunction with the Black cultural context. The word is said to have originated from the inner-city of New Orleans and was used frequently in New Orleans bounce music by rappers and DJs hosting block parties in the housing projects. On record, the 1993 song "Do the Jubilee All" by DJ Jubilee - which contains the lyrics "Twerk baby, twerk baby, twerk, twerk, twerk" - has been cited as its earliest use.

The word became popular in the 2000s, when it was used by Atlanta rapper Lil Jon and The East Side Boyz. A Google Trends search revealed that new interest in the word "twerking" arose in November 2011. It became the top "what is" search on Google following Miley Cyrus' twerking performance in 2013.

== Origin and precursors ==
Elizabeth Pérez (2015) states in the African and Black Diaspora: An International Journal:

Booty dances have threatened the status quo by emphasizing group membership, the free movement of forceful Black bodies, and "Afro"-Diasporic counter-narratives. The Colombian mapalé, or baile negro, is a case in point. Mapalé recalls the fish tail dances of the North American plantation; Davila writes that 'the fish's movements after they are captured resemble [the dance's] pelvic and midriff contractions to the beat of the drum' (Davila 2009, 120). 'The only dance that was permitted during times of Spanish rule', mapalé became associated with rebellion through its liberatory insistence on the body's value as a vector for the transmission of ancestral knowledge (Davila 2009, 120).

'Where dance on a social level was criminalized, in Mapalé, it continues to be an indestructible force of Afro-Colombian identity within the fabric of the Atlantic Coast' (Davila 2009, 134). The batuque, with its 'artificial rotations and contortions of the hip' was officially suppressed, as were candombe and the bongo (quoted in Röhrig Assunção 2003, 167). The consensus is that such dances cognate to twerk – as indicated by their names and presence among Bantu-language-speaking slaves – are Central African in origin. A number of scholars well versed in the matter have arrived at Kubik's conclusion: 'motional emphasis on the pelvis, buttocks, etc., especially pelvis thrusts or circular pelvis movements described in United States jazz dance history as "Congo grind" are always suspect of a Congo/Angola background' (Kubik 1979, 20).

Pérez (2015) states:

The historically proximate precursors to twerk are as seldom cited as its analogues. Twerk emerged from earlier movement styles, like 'the up-and-back hip-swinging bowed-legged movements of a dance called the Tootsie Roll' and p[ussy]-popping (Gaunt 2006, 285). As Miller notes, 'it is likely that P-Popping constitutes an expression of what Chadwick Hansen identified in the late 1960s as "a long tradition of erotic shaking dances in America", which "have clearly been continuous within the Negro community"' (Miller 2012, 98). Some of the earliest footage of such moves may be seen in clips of the legendary Joséphine Baker. Picart writes, '[Baker biographer Phyllis] Rose conjectures that Baker's frenzied improvisational "stomach dance" was probably derived from moves related to the belly dance: the Shake, the Shimmy, the Mess Around – all of which were popular with New York Black jazz dancers in 1920s' (Picart 2013, 58).

Other 'serpentine' dances that presaged twerk are the Georgia crawl and 'the sensuous grind' called ballin' the jack, both with their heyday in the nineteen-teens (Gaunt 2012, 108; George-Graves 2009, 59; Oliver 1999, 107–108). In the same period, 'From Florida came the Swamp Shimmy, in which vigorous undulations of body, hips, and limbs made up for lack of forward movement' (Oliver 1960, 149). The historical record indicates that dances like twerk date to the antebellum period in the American South. Enslaved people performed sinuous snake hip and fish tail dances on plantations during festivals and special gatherings, such as celebratory dinners. Perhaps tellingly, like the snake hip movement, twerk can serve as an 'embellishment' or 'an independent dance in its own right' (Hazzard-Gordon 1990, 123).

== Twerk dance ==
In 1990, the introduction of bounce music into the New Orleans music scene brought along the dance of twerking. In 1992, Panamanian singer Renato recorded the videoclip "El más sensual" (the most sexy), a reggae song with the twerking dance.

The diffusion of the dance phenomenon began earlier via local parties and eventually strip clubs often associated with mainstream rap music and video production aired by video cable television shows that featured rap music and R&B music. Popular video-sharing platforms such as YouTube amplified interest since the advent of digital social media.

=== Rise to national attention ===
Twerking first received national recognition in the United States in the early 2000s, when the song "Whistle While You Twurk" (2000), by Southern hip hop duo Ying Yang Twins, peaked at number 17 on the Billboard Hot R&B/Hip-Hop Songs component chart. It was later referenced in their later track "Say I Yi Yi" (2002), in which the lyrics "she got her hands up on her knees and her elbows on her thighs / she like to twerk and that's for certain I can tell that she fly" are heard. The chorus of Silkk the Shocker's 2001 song "That's Cool" features the line "Somebody that's off the chain / who could twerk that thang."

R&B and pop girl group Destiny's Child was the first mainstream American girl group to use the word in a song in their song "Jumpin' Jumpin'". Beyoncé made use of the word and dance in her 2005 song and corresponding music video "Check on It".

In 2013, the dance became a viral sensation beyond African-American popular culture, when pop singer Miley Cyrus used the dance in a video that was uploaded first on Facebook and then on YouTube in March which then later became a viral meme throughout social media outlets. Though twerking began trending as a web search in November 2011, and despite its origins in the bounce culture of New Orleans in the late 1980s, the word twerk would be added to the Oxford Dictionary Online and attributed to Cyrus following her appearance at the MTV VMA Awards in August 2013. It became the number one "what is" Google search that year as those outside the culture questioned the popularity of the dance. The word was a runner-up to "selfie" in the Oxford Dictionaries Word of the Year 2013.

=== Billboard charts ===
In 2006, the hit single "SexyBack", by American pop singer Justin Timberlake, featuring Timbaland, from the former's second studio album Futuresex/Lovesounds, featured Timbaland rapping the lyrics "Let me see what you're twerking with / Go ahead, be gone with it, Look at those hips". In 2007, the song "Pop, Lock & Drop It", by American rapper Huey, reached number six on the US Billboard Hot 100.

The 2012 single "Bandz a Make Her Dance" by Juicy J contains the lyric "Start twerking when she hear her song", while French Montana questions the ability of a girl to twerk by asking "What you twerkin' with?" in his 2012 single "Pop That" featuring fellow rappers Drake, Lil Wayne and Rick Ross. The aforementioned songs, along with "Express Yourself" by Nicky Da B and Diplo, "made twerking the most popular dance move since the Dougie". In 2014, the song "Anaconda" by Nicki Minaj peaked at number 2 on the Billboard Hot 100, makes numerous allusions to twerking.

In November 2018, the City Girls released a song called "Twerk" featuring rapper Cardi B which peaked on the US Billboard Hot 100 at number 29. The lyrics to the song ("Twerk-twerk-twerk-twerk-twerk-twerk with her") is self-explanatory as to how the City Girls wanted to grab the attention of their female audience. The music video has over 200 million views on YouTube as of June 2022.

=== In the media ===
In 2011, the Twerk Team, a group of female dancers from Atlanta who have posted several videos of themselves twerking on YouTube, were mentioned in the song "Round of Applause" by Waka Flocka Flame featuring Drake, in the line "Bounce that ass, shake that ass like the Twerk Team". Australian rapper Iggy Azalea has incorporated twerking into her live shows since 2011. In July 2012, during the Workaholics episode "The Lord's Force", Anders Holm says "Let's just, uh, put on some twerk videos or something, right?".

In March 2013, American pop singer Miley Cyrus posted a video on Facebook which featured her performing a twerking routine while wearing a unicorn suit, to the 2011 single "Wop" by J. Dash. The popularity of the video, along with parodies and responses made by fans, influenced the song's re-emergence on the Billboard Hot 100. Miley Cyrus's "Wop" video would go to become viral. By April 9, 2013, copies of the video had amassed over 4 million views on YouTube. Also in March 2013, Mollie King, an English singer-songwriter and lead vocalist of British-Irish girl group The Saturdays, was seen twerking when her bandmate Rochelle Humes uploaded the footage on YouTube.

American actress and singer Vanessa Hudgens was seen twerking in March 2013 on American late-night talk show The Tonight Show with Jay Leno. In September 2013, Hudgens was later seen twerking, this time to the song "Bubble Butt", during her performance at Bootsy Bellows in West Hollywood, with her girl group YLA. Hudgens was again seen twerking in a video for Shade 45's radio show Sway in the Morning. American actress and singer Ashley Tisdale can also be seen twerking in a video for Shade 45's radio show Sway in the Morning.

On July 9, 2013, a video was posted on the Twitter-owned video sharing service Vine entitled "Twerk Team", which featured a group of five women provocatively twerking to "Don't Drop That Thun Thun". The clip was shared by users over 100,000 times, becoming a trend for the community and users created their own responses and parodies featuring the song, collected under the hashtags "#dontdropthat" and "#thunthun". The viral popularity of the Vine clips led to an unexpected increase in sales for the song; prior to the posting of the "Twerk Team" clip, only 4,000 copies of the song had been sold; in the following weeks, sales went up to 34,000, then to over 72,000. By late July, "Don't Drop That Thun Thun" had reached No. 5 on Billboard's R&B/Hip-Hop Digital Songs chart, and it eventually peaked at No. 35 on the Billboard Hot 100 chart.

Both "Wop" and "Don't Drop That Thun Thun" have been cited as examples of how viral and user-created videos can bring renewed interest to songs; Spin writer Jordan Sargent considered "Wop" to be rap music's "Harlem Shake moment", but not a meme to the same extent as it. In April 2013, American rapper Danny Brown released the song "Express Yourself", inspired by music producer Diplo's song of the same name. The song, produced by Trampy, features a fast-paced electronic beat and is a composition about the popular dance craze twerking. Brown dedicated the song "to all the ladies that like to turn up and have fun," in which he raps "Toes on the wall and her ass in the air / And she twerk that thing like she ain't have a care".

In the music video for Barbadian singer Rihanna's single "Pour It Up", which was released in May 2013, the singer can be seen twerking. In June 2013, American rapper Busta Rhymes released a Jamaican dancehall-inspired single titled "Twerk It", featuring Nicki Minaj, who has been featured on several other "twerking songs", including "Shakin' It 4 Daddy" by Robin Thicke, "Dance (A$$)" by Big Sean and "Clappers" by Wale. Minaj can be seen twerking in all four of the aforementioned songs' respective music videos. Minaj can also be seen twerking in the music videos for American rapper Nelly's single "Get Like Me" and American singer Ciara's single "I'm Out". In August 2013, the song "Twerk", by Lil Twist, featuring pop singers Miley Cyrus and Justin Bieber, was leaked online.

On July 14, 2013, Showtime broadcast Season 1 Episode 3 of the series Ray Donovan, entitled "Twerk", in which actor Jon Voight's character enters a college library and pays a student to give up his computer terminal so that he can watch online videos of women twerking. A YouTube video of the scene has more than 38,000 views.

In August 2013, Juicy J announced via Twitter that he would give out a $50,000 scholarship for the girl who can twerk the best. The competition is inspired by the track "Scholarship" on his third album Stay Trippy, which contains the lyric "Keep twerking baby, might earn you a scholarship."

In early September 2013, a video titled "Worst Twerk Fail EVER - Girl Catches Fire!", began circulating around online; the video went on to become viral with over 9 million views, and received media coverage. The following week, American comedian and television host Jimmy Kimmel revealed the video was a hoax that he and his team had devised, on Jimmy Kimmel Live!. In April 2014, the video won the Webby Award for best viral clip of the year.

Also in September, "Twerk" from the MTV VMA show was named the Top Television Word of the Year (Teleword) of the 2012–2013 TV season by the Global Language Monitor. In October 2013, American actress Beth Behrs, of American television sitcom 2 Broke Girls, was seen twerking on The Ellen DeGeneres Show. Behrs was later seen twerking to the 1992 hit "Baby Got Back", in January 2014, during the 40th annual awards ceremony of the People's Choice Awards, which she hosted alongside her co-star Kat Dennings.

The fifth episode of the fifth season of the American musical television series Glee, which aired November 13, 2013 and was titled "The End of Twerk", revolved around the twerking phenomenon. The seventh episode of the second season of the American reality television series Bad Girls All-Star Battle, which aired February 25, 2014 and was titled "Twerk It Out", featured the contestants twerking as fast as possible with pedometers on their back.

In August 2013, American recording artist Miley Cyrus, generated controversy following a sexually provocative performance during the 2013 MTV Video Music Awards, in which Cyrus twerked during a medley of her track "We Can't Stop", "Blurred Lines" and "Give It 2 U" by Robin Thicke. Cyrus also received criticism for "stealing" African-American culture, also known as cultural appropriation.

In October 2013, Valerie Dixon who was 27 years old, was arrested in Lake County, Florida, because she was twerking and speaking foul language in front of a school bus. Other arrests in Florida for electric twerking in public include the video blogger Carmel Kitten and two unnamed Canadian tourists.

In August 2014, American recording artist Taylor Swift, featured twerking in the music video to her single "Shake It Off". This caused some controversy with American rapper Earl Sweatshirt saying that the video was "perpetuating stereotypes".

In January 2024, the Guinness world record for the longest duration twerking, was set by Babajide Isreal Adebanjo, in Lagos Nigeria. He twerked for 3 hours, 30 minutes.

== See also ==
- African-American dance
- Belly dance
- Cordax
- Daggering
- Erotic dance
- Grinding
- Lordosis behavior
- M'alayah
- Mapouka
- Moulding of Cockle-bread
- Ndombolo
- 'ote'a
- Pelvic thrust
- Sandungueo
- Soukous
- Surra de Bunda
- Tamure
- 'upa'upa
