= Tahitian drumming =

Style of drumming indigenous to Tahiti and French Polynesia

Tahitian Drumming
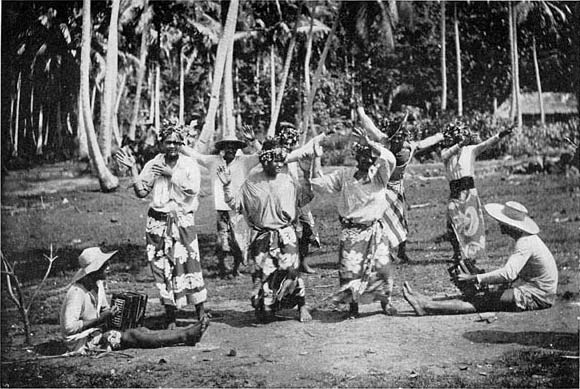
- Tahitian 'upa'upa dance circa 1909
- Cultural origins: French Polynesia, Tahiti
- Typical instruments: pahu, fa‘atete, to‘ere (pate), vivo, pu, ukulele, pahu tupa‘i rima

Tahitian drumming is a style of drumming native to Tahiti and French Polynesia. Tahitian drumming and dance have become symbols of Polynesian heiva to the western world. Heiva is the Tahitian term for entertainment. This authentic performance symbolizes the past and present state of social hierarchies within the community and the island. There has been a significant amount of change to Tahitian drum dancing within the past fifty years. These changes have come from many different aspects of Polynesian society. However, many of them stem from the broader outreach of this tradition to the rest of the world. This music has served as inspiration for many other styles across the globe, especially in other areas of the Pacific.

== History ==
Tahitian heiva is an authentic performance that manages to symbolize both the past and present state of social hierarchies within the community while describing, in full, the state of the land itself. Although important historically, there has been a significant amount of change to Tahitian drum dancing within the past seventy years. These changes come from many different aspects of the Polynesian society, however, many of them stem from the broader outreach of this wonderful tradition to the rest of the world. This music has served as inspiration for many other styles across the globe, especially in other areas of the Pacific, and will continue to do so for years to come.

Tahitian drumming has an extremely rich history, however, the terminology has changed drastically over the years. For example, Tahitian drumming and dancing is now known as ‘ote‘a. This term only started being used around the turn of the century. Over the course of the twentieth century the dance (and especially performance) has become much more commercialized.

== Instruments ==
=== Traditional instruments ===
The drums musicians play have a hierarchy system. Drummers start on a large bass drum called tariparau (sometimes called pahu). This is the only drum that the very few female drummers in Tahiti play. It has two membranes traditionally made out of sharkskin and is struck with a single mallet making the timbre low but only slightly resonate. It provides the basic pulse for the rhythm.

The second drum in the rank is the fa‘atete drum. It is a single membrane which can be struck with hands or drum sticks. It is usually made out of coconut tree wood with sharkskin stretched across with intricate carving of flowers, sea turtles, leaves and designs on the bottom. It plays a slightly more complex texture than the tariparau. It has a high tom sound with less resonation.

The last main drum, the to‘ere (or pate), is the most challenging to play, and is one of the main sounds associated with Tahiti. The to‘ere is a hollowed out log, usually from milo, kamani or kou wood (all trees native to Tahiti). The instrument is anywhere from two to six feet long (usually around three to four), with a slit down the side. It is played with a cone-shaped stick also made out of wood, and depending on where the instrument is struck, the sound will change. Like the tariparau, it also has carvings. The timbre is a hollow sound with higher pitches and moderate resonation.

The ranking system in the drums help in the transmission of the rhythms. Starting out on the tariparau provides the musician with aural access to the rhythms played on the fa‘atete and to‘ere while playing the basic pehe. Moving through the drum ranks means learning the rhythms of that instrument. Aside from this, musicians learn the rhythms through oral teachings.

=== Other instruments ===
With so much focus on rhythm, there is little room for melody. Tahitians shout sometimes during a performance, usually only one pitch with a few syllables. Sometimes, a vocal cue will be used if the lead drummer feels that the dancers are not on the same page. With no singing, text is rare when it comes to Tahitian drum dance. The only music-related notation is the transmission of rhythms that ethnomusicologists have created. Though drums are the main instruments, there are other instruments that can be used in the contemporary ensemble. The vivo is a flute-like instrument with three to four holes that follow a pentatonic scale. The pu is a conch shell that was traditionally used by warriors at sea, but is now recognized as an occasional accompanying instrument to the drumming and dance performance. The Tahitian and Hawaiian ukulele have been adopted also as acceptable instruments, though traditionally it is not part of the performance. Lastly, the pahu tupa‘i rima is a single membrane drum that is played with the hands. It is considered at the bottom of the drum ranks because it is a contemporary instrument that newcomers play.

== Rhythm ==
Tahitian drumming compositions are composed of single rhythmic phrases that Tahitians call pehe. There are three parts of a pehe, each serving a different purpose. The first segment, fa‘atomora‘a, is an introductory phrase. It is a quick snippet that is played to announce which pehe it will be. It does this with rhythm and by being played on a certain instrument. Additionally, it also announces if there is any potential change to the program order at that time. The second segment of the pehe is the main rhythm pattern. The last part is the toma, which is the ending pattern. There are varieties of patterns to choose from and the choice determines the appropriate movement for the dancers and the number of pulses to expect before quickly ending the piece. Some pehe are used as fillers and transition periods without any choreography, but they still cue the dancers for what is coming up next.

== Performance ==
Performances of Tahitian music are very structured in their set-up and roles. The different cues during performances are based on gender and age, and have an important hierarchy that mirrors the social positions outside of the stage. Troupes often have a manager that is not part of the actual performance, but instead prepares and directs. This can include deciding on the music selection, song texts, costumes, choreography, and anything else the performance may entail. The dances are practiced with male drummers; however, the dancers can be male or female. The dancers are youthful, usually between the ages of fifteen and twenty (this age group is referred to as taure‘are‘a). This is because the dancing is supposed to symbolize the beauty and strength of the youth. It is also because, at this age, they are still free of the responsibilities of their pending adulthood. If older dancers are used it is seen as a funny parody of the real thing and it is not taken seriously. The group of drummers is much smaller than the group of dancers, and the average age is much older. The musicians are either located on the side or behind the dancers but they hold the more powerful position because the dancers follow their lead. This follows the social order because the older males are the dominant force behind the performances and also the most respected. The two groups are not only separated physically, but also socially. Because of the differences in gender and age, the drummers and dancers do not typically communicate with each other verbally during rehearsals. Instead, the director of the group acts as a middleman so they do not need to interact.

The drummers are able to add some flexibility to the rigidness of the Tahitian drum dancing performances. The drummers have to be able to communicate well (through cues) with the dancers because they often make spur of the moment changes to the music. For example, sometimes they choose to repeat previously used material or add unrehearsed music to the performance. The performers are trained to listen closely in order to follow the changing shape of the performance. The cues used can come in many shapes and forms. In one instance the cue could be a drum solo which is introducing a new rhythmic pattern, and in another situation vocal calls or physical gestures can be used. An example of a physical gesture that is used is when a finger is raised, which means that the musician is clarifying how many repetitions of a specific pattern or part will happen. Because of this use of signals, both the dancers and drummers need to be extremely knowledgeable in regards to rhythmic patterns (pehe) before being part of a live Tahitian drum dance performance. Dancers do not use signaling because they are not allowed to alter the performance.

== Dance ==
The choreography is determined by the rhythm and tempo. The style of dance is widely known for the specific hip movements that later led to the hula dance in Hawaii. They are abrupt hip movements that are enhanced by long grass skirts. The upper body remains more fluid and the head rarely moves. The dancers are synchronized. In partner dances the male dancer is often doing a different type of motion (involving bending at the knees with their arms out parallel to the floor) than the female dancer.

=== Dance costumes ===
Traditional dance costumes in Tahiti changed with the people who arrived on the islands. Between 1776 and 1780, Captain James Cook sailed for a third voyage on the Pacific. On this trip he brought an artist who captured the image of the dancers of the island. The females are described to be wearing tapa cloth with feathers covering the breast and hanging from tassels around the waist. Braided hair rests as a headpiece with flowers inlaid. The males wore undecorated tapa around their waist and nothing on their head. Following the conversion to Christianity, dance was prohibited until 1859 when the French organized a festival after Napoleon III defeated Italy. There were competitions for music, costumes and dance. Though there was permission to dance and drum, clothing was still closely monitored. Tapa was still the main fabric used and dancers were still covered, but 'streamers' were added. They were made out of baby coconut fronds and tied around the waist much like today’s grass skirt. Underneath, men wore pants while women wore oversized dresses.

Around 1930, the costumes changed yet again to be more revealing and more traditional. Hibiscus bark became the standard material for grass skirts, men no longer wore pants underneath, and women started showing their midriffs. The dress also changed according to type of musical accompaniment. For compositions using drums and membranophones, natural materials were used. They were called Le Grande Costume. For more modern compositions that featured the ukulele and guitar, costumes were called Costume en Tissue and were made out of pareu material that did not exceed two yards in length. At this time, there was a mass movement to keep the island of Tahiti and surrounding areas traditional in their culture.

Today there are multiple parts to the Tahitian le grande costume. The more is the traditional grass skirt that is associated with Pacific island life. The taupo‘o is the headdress and the hatua is the belt. The tapea titi is a bra for women and the tahei is a shawl for men. The ‘i‘i and tahiri are optional dance whisks and fans made from hibiscus fiber or coconut leaves that are held in the dancers hands. The goal of costume competitions at festivals for Tahitian dance is to keep the traditional dress alive, hence the natural materials covering minimal amount of skin.

Perhaps the most important part of the traditional dance costume is the more. The process for creating the thin strips is tedious and time consuming. Made from hibiscus bark, one cut is made to remove the bark while keeping it in one piece. Once it is cut, Tahitians soak it in water for days to soften it before removing the dark bark, and hitting the light bark until the fibers are worn thin. Once completely dry, the streamer is tied to a chord that goes around the waist while another one runs parallel below the original chord to secure down the strips. The strips are naturally white but sometimes they are dyed yellow or red. Tahitians avoid colors such as blue, green, purple and pink because they cannot obtain natural dye from their island for these colors. Along with dye, coconut shells and pieces are used to accent the costume.

== The role of women ==
When performing Tahitian drumming, the musicians have a very close bodily connection with the act of playing itself. For example, the physical strength used is a large part of performing for the men in this position. Drummers today use a much faster pace and more rhythmic complexity than that of the past. This musical progression has made the concept of strength, skill, and stamina far more essential than ever before. This strength is also important in creating the sound that the Tahitian society prefers to hear, which they refer to as a "thunder" sound. Because the drumming involves such physicality, Tahitians use it as an excuse for one of the main reasons why women should not participate in drumming. If a woman in their society (in the past and today) chose to drum, it would be seen as shameful. Even today, women do not participate in drumming, even though the nation has become modernized. Some women have tried to challenge this ideal, especially since the 1960s. Unfortunately, when this happens the women become isolated from the rest of society so they have yet to succeed. Today there is not a single female professional drummer and it is still seen as one of the manliest traditions in the Tahitian culture. Drumming is on the same level as activities like rock climbing and spear throwing. If a woman wants to be involved in music, it is socially acceptable for her to either be a vocalist or to pursue the guitar.

== Today ==
Over the course of the twentieth century the dance (and especially performance) has become much more commercialized. Today, groups are able to travel the world to perform and some even have standing contracts in other countries. Videos and DVDs are also available. Because of these changes it has also been noted that men keep drumming longer in life. This is most likely due to the fact that it is now much more lucrative than it used to be because of these new revenue streams. There are not only more financial benefits to playing, but also the status of drummers has risen significantly over time. These new opportunities would never have been possible before the 1970s because they previously did not have a high social status or education level.

== See also ==
- Music of French Polynesia
- 'ote'a
