= Pelvic thrust =

Thrusting motion of the pelvic region

The pelvic thrust is the thrusting motion of the pelvic region, which is used for a variety of activities, such as dance, exercise, or sexual activity.

== Sexual activity ==
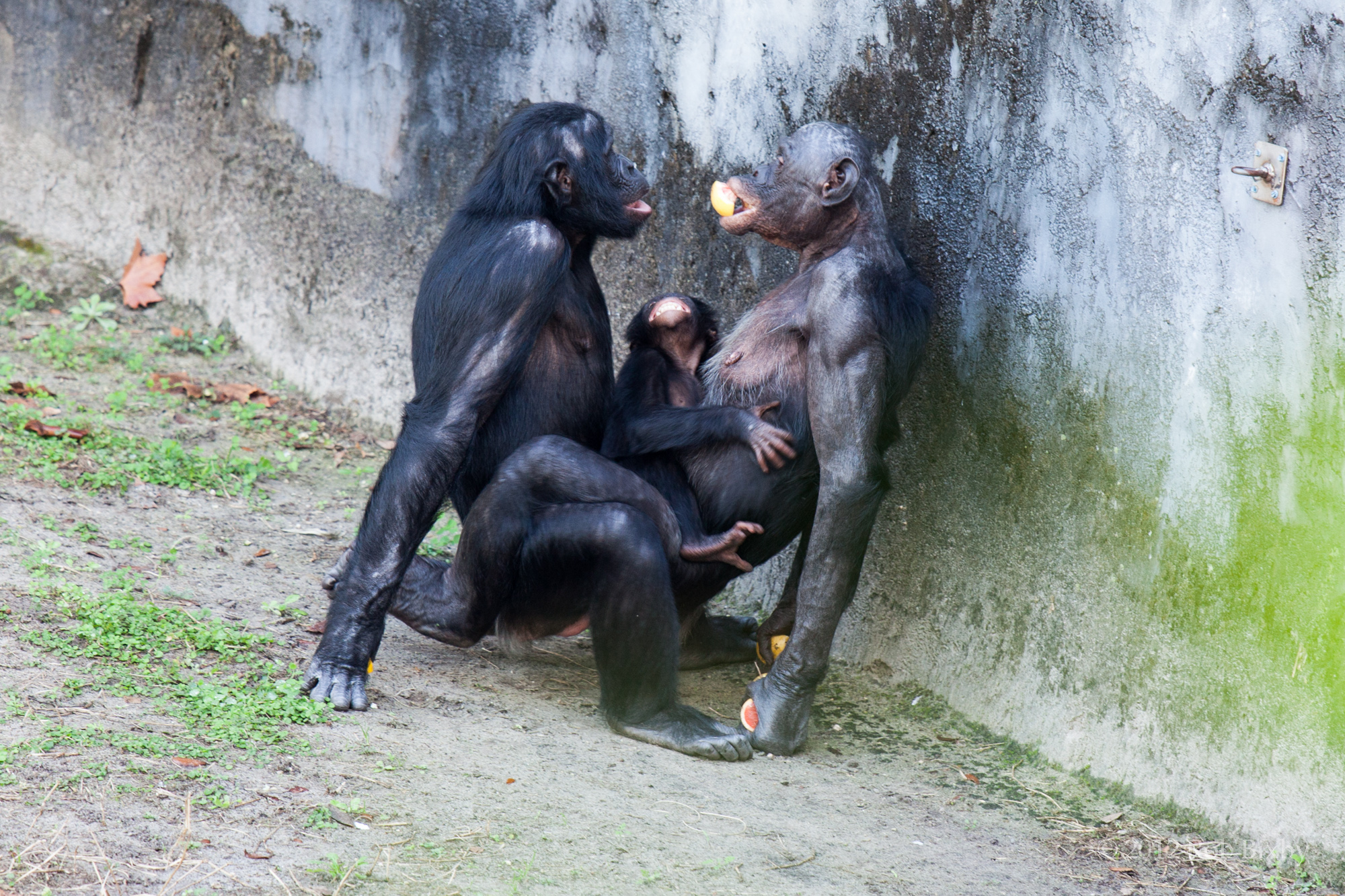
Two bonobos mating, with a juvenile in the middle

The pelvic thrust is used during copulation by many species of mammals, including humans, or for other sexual activities (such as non-penetrative sex). In 2007, German scientists noted that female monkeys could increase the vigor and number of pelvic thrusts made by the male by shouting during intercourse. In whitetail deer, copulation consists of a single pelvic thrust.

== Dance ==
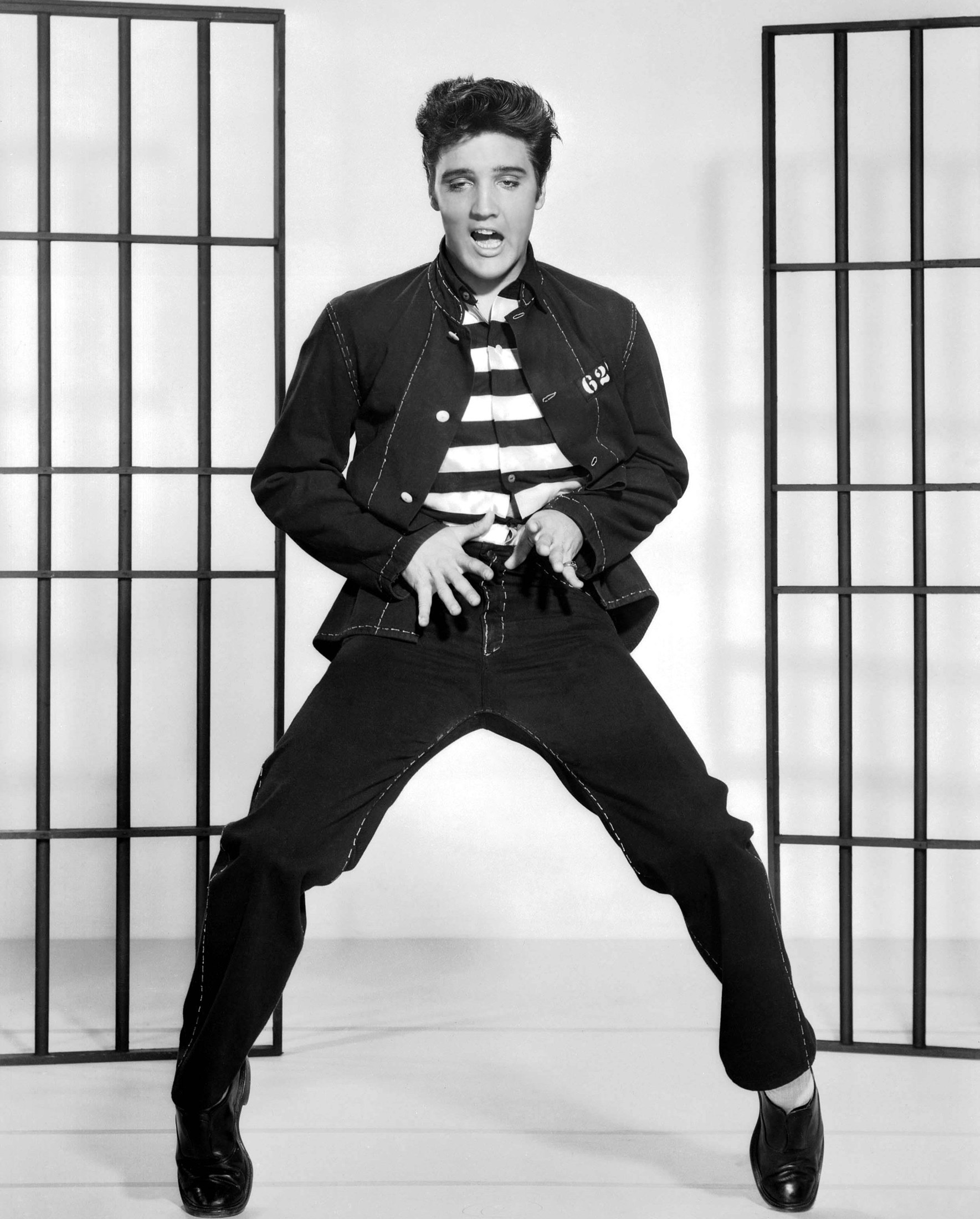
Elvis Presley performing "Jailhouse Rock"

One of the first to perform this move on stage was Elvis Presley. It was quite controversial due to its obvious sexual connotations. Due to this controversy, he was sometimes shown (as seen on his third appearance on The Ed Sullivan Show) from the waist up on TV. Later, the pelvic thrust also became one of the signature moves of Michael Jackson. It is also mentioned in "Time Warp", a song from The Rocky Horror Show, as a part of the choreography associated with the dance itself: "But it's the pelvic thrust that will drive you insane-a-a-ane." Twerking, a reverse and sometimes passive form of pelvic thrust dance move, is also a very popular form of hip-hop dance move. The sideways pelvic thrust is a famous female dance move in India and Bangladesh and known as thumka. It appears in the lyrics of various Bollywood songs.

== Exercise ==
Hip thrusts can be used as an exercise to train the gluteus maximus muscle. The athlete will get into a reclined position and thrust their hips upward to lift weights balanced on their lap.

== Infants ==
Pelvic thrusting is observed in infant monkeys, apes, and humans. These observations led ethologist John Bowlby (1969) to suggest that infantile sexual behavior may be the rule in mammals, not the exception. Thrusting has been observed in humans at eight to 10 months of age and may be an expression of affection. Typically, the infant clings to the parent, then nuzzles, thrusts, and rotates the pelvis for several seconds.

== See also ==
- Booty shaking
- Lordosis behavior
- Paquito el Chocolatero
- Twerking
- Umbigada

== Bibliography ==
- Tim Glover (30 June 2012). Mating Males: An Evolutionary Perspective on Mammalian Reproduction. Cambridge University Press. ISBN 978-1-107-00001-8.
- Jean-Baptiste Leca; Michael A. Huffman; Paul L. Vasey (19 January 2012). The Monkeys of Stormy Mountain: 60 Years of Primatological Research on the Japanese Macaques of Arashiyama. Cambridge University Press. ISBN 978-0-521-76185-7.
- H. Frank (30 April 1987). Man and Wolf: Advances, Issues, and Problems in Captive Wolf Research. Springer. ISBN 978-90-6193-614-5.
- Alan F. Dixson (26 January 2012). Primate Sexuality: Comparative Studies of the Prosimians, Monkeys, Apes, and Humans. Oxford University Press. ISBN 978-0-19-150342-9.
- Edward C. Feldman; Richard Richard William Nelson (2004). Canine and feline endocrinology and reproduction. Elsevier Health Sciences. ISBN 978-0-7216-9315-6.
- Katherine A. Houpt (25 January 2011). Domestic Animal Behavior for Veterinarians and Animal Scientists. John Wiley & Sons. ISBN 978-0-470-95843-8.
