= Jongo =

Brazilian musical and dance form

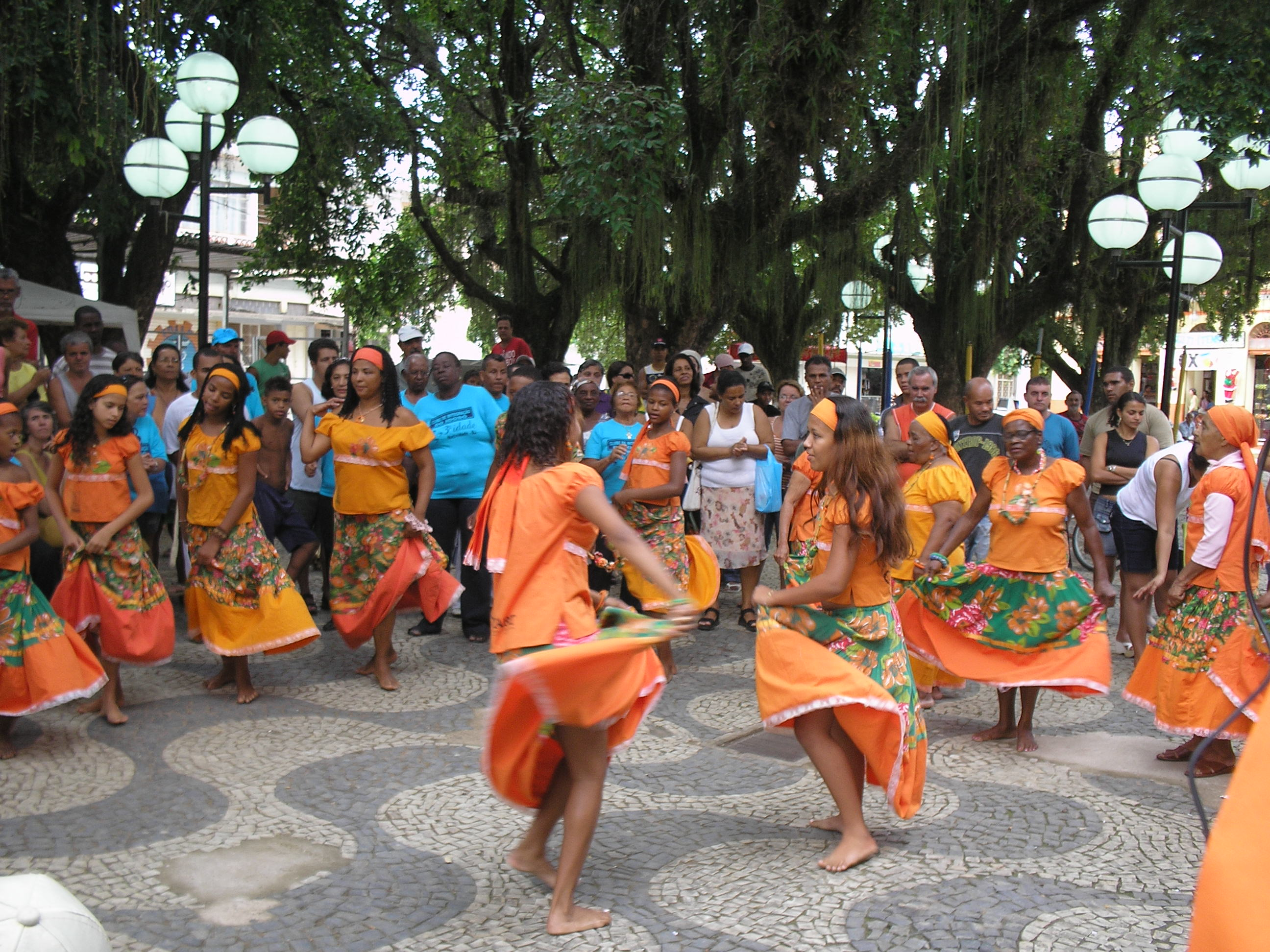
Presentation of the Group of Caxambu Michel Tannus in Porciúncula

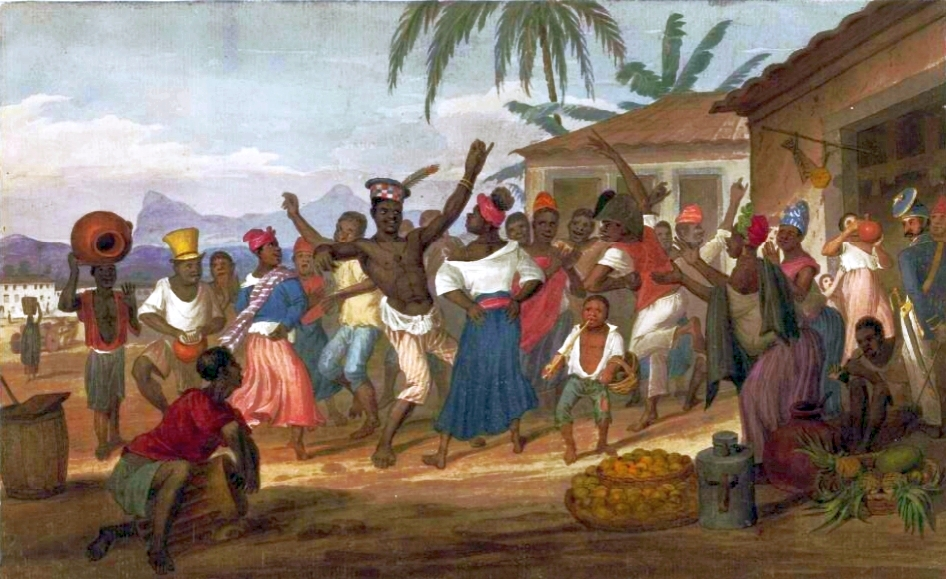
Jongo is a Brazilian dance of West African origin (c. 1822)

Vovó Maria Joana Rezadeira talks about jongo in an interview for the "Art Program from A to Z", from TV Educativa. Image of Fundação Centro Brasileiro de TV Educativa.

Jongo, also known as caxambu or tabu, is a dance and musical genre of black communities from southeast Brazil. It originated from the dances performed by slaves who worked at coffee plantations in the Paraíba Valley, between Rio de Janeiro and São Paulo, and also at farms in some areas of Minas Gerais and Espírito Santo. Jongo is a member of a larger group of Afro-Brazilian dances, such as batuque, tambor de crioula, and zambê, which feature many elements in common, including the use of fire-tuned drums, the call-and-response form of group singing, the poetical language used in the songs, and the umbigada, a distinctive step whereby two dancers hit their bellies.

Jongos usually take place during a nightlong party in which several people dance in pairs or in a circle, to the sound of two or more drums, while a soloist sings short phrases answered by the group. The drums, built from hollow tree trunks covered with animal hide in one of the extremities and tuned by the heat of a bonfire, are called caxambu or tambu (the bigger one) and candongueiro (the smaller one). Other instruments can also be used, such as a large and low-pitched friction drum, called puíta or angoma-puíta, and a rattle made of straw and small beads, called guaiá, inguaiá, or angóia. Jongo songs, also called pontos, are sung in Portuguese but may include words of African origin. Often improvised, they are of several types, each one with a particular function: the pontos de louvação are used to salute spiritual entities, the owners of the house and the ancestors; the pontos de visaria or bizarria are sung for fun purposes, to enliven the dancers or as a vehicle for satirical commentaries; the pontos de demanda, porfia, or gurumenta are used by singers who challenge each other. On the coffee plantations during the nineteenth century, jongos occupied an intermediate position between religious ceremony and secular diversion. Performed on weekends or on the eve of holidays, they were often the only form of entertainment available to the slaves, and also the only opportunity to perform forbidden African religious rites, even if disguised as profane dances. The use of African terms, combined with a rich metaphorical language, made jongo songs obscure to the white masters, thus providing a means for the expression of social criticism and cryptic messages from one slave to the others.

Though in the twentieth century jongo became essentially a profane diversion, it never lost completely its religious aspects; it is closely related to umbanda, a syncretic religion mixing African, Catholic, and spiritist beliefs born in the first decades of the twentieth century. Jongo and umbanda share a common cosmology, and many jongueiros are devout umbandistas. Today, jongos continue to be performed by descendants of slaves in a least a dozen communities, in rural settings as well as in the periphery of cities. Since the 1990s jongo has experienced a revival and become more widely known as a hallmark of Afro-Brazilian culture.

== Sources ==
- Carneiro, Edison. “Samba de umbigada.” In: Folguedos Tradicionais. Rio de Janeiro: Funarte/INF, 1982 [1961].
- Dias, Paulo. “A outra festa negra.” In: Festa: cultura e sociabilidade na América Portuguesa, edited by I. Jancsó and I. Kantor. São Paulo: Hucitec/Edusp/Fapesp/Imprensa Oficial, 2001.
- Lara, Silvia Hunold & Pacheco, Gustavo (orgs.) Memória do jongo: as gravações históricas de Stanley J. Stein. Rio de Janeiro: Folha Seca, 2007.
- Meira Monteiro, Pedro & Stone, Michael (orgs.) Cangoma calling: Spirits and Rhythms of Freedom in Brazilian Jongo Slavery Songs. Dartmouth: University of Massachusetts, Luso-Asio-Afro-Brazilian Studies & Theory, vol. 3, 2013. http://www.laabst.net/laabst3/#sthash.yWulDIw0.dpuf
- Pacheco, Gustavo. “Jongos.” In: Colin Palmer (ed.) Encyclopedia of African-American Culture and History: The Black Experience in the Americas. New York: Macmillan, 2005.
- Ribeiro, Maria de Lourdes Borges. O Jongo. Rio de Janeiro: Funarte/Instituto Nacional do Folclore, 1984.
- Stein, Stanley J. Vassouras: A Brazilian Coffee County, 2nd ed. Princeton, N.J.: Princeton University Press, 1985.
