= Bust a Groove =

1998 video game

- Cover of the PAL version of Bust a Groove
- Developer: Metro
- Publishers: JP: Enix; NA: 989 Studios; EU: Sony Computer Entertainment; JP: Atlus/Namco (arcade)
- Artists: Hideyuki Tanaka; Makiko Morioka
- Platforms: PlayStation, Arcade, mobile
- Release: JP: January 29, 1998; EU: November 20, 1998; NA: November 25, 1998
- Genre: Rhythm
- Modes: Single-player, multiplayer

Bust a Groove is a 1998 rhythm video game developed by Metro and published by Enix for the PlayStation. It was released by 989 Studios in North America and Sony Computer Entertainment in Europe.

One of the first rhythm games to follow in the wake of PaRappa the Rapper's unexpected popularity, the game combined PaRappa the Rapper-inspired rhythm-based gameplay with elements of fighting games, including special moves designed to damage the opponent and head-to-head competitive play. The Japanese version is titled Bust a Move: Dance & Rhythm Action (バスト ア ムーブ Dance & Rhythm Action, Basuto A Mūbu Dance & Rhythm Action), but in all other regions it was released as Bust a Groove, to avoid a trademark conflict with the Japanese puzzle game Puzzle Bobble, which was released in North America and Europe as Bust-A-Move.

The sequel, Bust a Groove 2, unlike its predecessor, was never planned to be released in Europe, and Dance Summit 2001, the third game in the series, was released only in Japan on the PlayStation 2.

== Gameplay ==
The game play revolves around the beat of the music playing, displaying arrows that correspond to directions on the D-Pad, as well as the symbols for the circle and X button. By every fourth beat of the song, the player must match the commands on the screen, causing their character to complete a dance move, or else it is considered a miss. When the player performs a combo of eight dance moves, advanced paths with more complex moves allows the player to earn more points.

The player also uses a "Jammer" as an attack to interrupt rivals, which can also be dodged by a somersault move. This was used by pressing the square button by causing the player to do the back flip, and avoid the "Jammer".

== Characters ==
=== Main ===
Name	Age	Dance Style	Jammer	Info
Heat	19	Breakdance	A giant flame comes down on the opponent	He is the "poster boy" of this game. He used to be a racer, but hasn't returned to the track because he was nearly incinerated when he was involved in a terrible accident. Luckily, he made a total recovery with the ability to manipulate fire.
Frida	17	West Coast Hip-Hop	She paints a wolf's head, which bites the opponent	She is an artist who lives in a shack. Her ambition is to use the Groovetron to give life to her paintings. Her favorite word is "Life".
Strike	21	Gangsta Walking	Shoots the opponent with his two guns	He is from a notorious street gang, and managed to do something bad to get in the state penitentiary. He is gathering his fellow prisoners to form a dance team, called "The Ball and Chain Revue." Strike's favorite word is "Freedom."
Hamm	30	Hip-Hop	A giant hamburger squishes the opponent	He used to be a great dancer, but his love for junk food has left him somewhat chubby. He became a hamburger joint employee to satisfy his craving for junk food. He wants to use the Groovetron to help him diet. His favorite word is "Move".
Shorty	12	Candy Hip-Hop/Funk	Giant pieces of candy that fall on her opponent	She is the daughter of a diplomat father and a supermodel mother. Obviously, Shorty lives in a rich family with nothing better to do than dance with Columbo, her pet mouse. Her love for outdated music drives her to madness at a flea market, where she frantically searches for 8-track tapes. Her favorite word is "Friendship".
Kelly	23	Soul Bump and Grind	A burst of sparkling energy is gathered in her rattle and thrown at the opponent	She is a secretary who has a fetish with everything infantile (related to babies), and wants to find a man. She bought her rubber suit to dress in when she is a guest at secret parties. She seems worried about her new rubber suit; this may be due to its cost.
Gas-O	15	House	Traps the opponent in a gas chamber	Gas-O first became interested in becoming a scientist when he was eight. Now at 15, he has accomplished several outstanding tasks, including consulting for NASA, logging time on a particle accelerator, and studying the gaseous elements in his laboratory. Gas-O hopes to use the Groovetron to develop the ultimate gas.
Pinky Diamond	Unknown	Motown	Giant tarot cards fall around the opponent, cursing them	She is a stripper, fortune-teller, a professional contract killer, and she does hair. It's no wonder she's so weird. She has the power to see into your lover's heart and claims to know you better than you know yourself. Your secrets are nowhere near being safe close to her!
Hiro	20	Lock/Disco	An autographed picture of himself crashes onto the opponent	Hiro is a narcissistic disco-loving character. He lives in a costly tiny apartment where he works with his computer until Saturday night, when his playboy antics really take off. Don't even begin to try to match his Saturday night standards—he is truly one of a kind. His favorite word is "Split".
Kitty-N (Kitty Nakajima)	16	Modern Jazz and Jazz Funk	A white crescent-shaped boomerang with a pink heart on it is thrown at the opponent	This lovable TV star is on break from the hit TV show "Love Love Senshi Miracle 5." She wants to use the Groovetron's power to make her the ultimate TV star. She has bought the penthouse floor of a building and converted it into her private dancing studio, just for the purposes of attracting more people.

=== Hidden ===
Name	Age	Dance Style	Jammer	Info
Robo-Z	Unknown	Vogue	A blast of shock-inducing waves	Robo-Z was constructed by a tyrannical organization only known as "Secret X." Robo-Z was built for the sole purpose of harnessing total power of the Groovetron. Robo-Z is 50 feet tall on the final level, but on other stages, he is about the same height as normal characters. He is unlocked by finishing the game on Hard difficulty after the first run through, or after completing two run throughs at an easier level.
Capoeira	Unknown	Capoeira	A wall of energy dazes the opponent	Capoeira, individually known as Kiki and Lala, have come to Earth to collect Japanese billboards to construct a giant fan. They are also here to display the power of the Groovetron, their special "dancing energy" invention. Unlocked by finishing the game on Medium after the first completion.
Columbo	Unknown	Candy Hip-Hop	Giant pieces of candy fall on his opponent	Columbo is Shorty's pet mouse, whom she keeps in her chest pocket while dancing. He is unlocked by finishing the game on Medium difficulty or higher with Shorty after the first run through, but will also jump out of Shorty's pocket and dance with her should she successfully execute a level seven freeze.
Burger Dog	Unknown	Hip-Hop	A giant hamburger squishes the opponent	Burger Dog is the dog that runs the restaurant in Hamm's stage. Is unlocked by playing the game through on Medium difficulty or higher with Hamm after the first completion.

== Music ==
Song	Artist	Character	Notes
Sora To Umi To Niji No Yume (空と海と虹の夢) (Dreams Of The Sky, Sea and Rainbow)	Akiko Sugawara & Ike Nelson	Frida	Credited as "DJ Ike"
CHEMICAL LOVE	Kaleb James & Chey	Gas-O	
i luv hamburgers	RAVEMAN feat. Chosen Effect	Hamm/Burger Dog	Chosen Effect was credited as "Terry-T" & "Sweet Jodi"
2Bad	Chosen Effect	Heat	Credited as "Sweet Jodi"
The Natural Playboy	Kaleb James	Hiro	
Transform	Atsuko Yamaoka & Kaleb James	Kelly	
Transform	Robbie Danzie & Kaleb James	Kelly	American/European release
Aozora no KNIFE (青空のknife)† (Blue Knife Sky)	Hatsumi Morinaga	Kitty-N	
Bust A Groove	Sharon Woolf	Kitty-N	American/European release
I know	Donyale Renee & Kaleb James	Pinky	Credited as Donyale Fredericks
Waratte pon (笑ってぽん) (Cracking Smiles)	Rina Genga	Shorty/Columbo	
SHORTY and the EZ MOUSE	Crystal Kay	Shorty/Columbo	American/European release
POWER	Chosen Effect	Strike	Credited as "Terry-T" & "Sweet Jodi"
Uwasa No KAPOERA (噂のカポエラ) (The Rumoring Capoeira)	Rui Tsurumizu	Capoeira	
CAPOEIRA	Dawn Moore	Capoeira	American/European release
FLYIN' TO YOUR SOUL	Donna Burke	Robo-Z	Credited as "Donna"

† In addition to the song, there was an instrumental version—in which titled "blue knife (start G move mix)" from the soundtrack—was used for the opening cutscene for the game. There is also a different version, calling it "blue knife dream (orchestra stall mix)", it was used for the staff credits.

== Release ==
In Japan a premium version was released containing a "premium disc" with four movies. Accomplishing certain tasks in the game unlocks certain movies. One of the movies features Hatsumi Morinaga, the artist responsible for singing the theme of Kitty-N's stage. This feature contains shots of the artist singing the song in the studio, an interview with the artist, and a live-action version of the game, with costumed Japanese dancers taking the parts of the various characters. The other three movies contained within the disc were all for other Enix games: Astronōka, Star Ocean: The Second Story, and Hello Charlie (released as Eggs of Steel in the U.S.). The premium version is otherwise identical to the game-only version.

The following changes were made in the English localization of the game:

- Hiro's cigarette smoking was removed.
- Hamm's general appearance was changed from a ganguro into a Caucasian.
- In Hamm's song, "McDonald's, Burger King, or any other place" was replaced with "Hamburger lovers, let me hear you say ho".
- A line in Strike's song referring to alcohol was removed, leaving an instrumental break following the line "Like Arnold Schwarzenegger, I'm the only true Eraser".
- During gameplay, Strike drinks from a hip flask in the Japanese version. This was changed to a can of soda pop.
- The songs "Transform, "Waratte Pon", "Aozora no KNIFE" and "Uwasa no KAPOEIRA" were re-recorded to English for the American and European market. Transform kept its title, and the other three were retitled as "SHORTY and the EZ MOUSE", "Bust a Groove" and "CAPOEIRA".

== Other versions ==
=== Arcade ===
An arcade edition of Bust a Groove, although released only in Japan, held the title of Bust a Groove. The controls are the same as the PlayStation version but the controller is significantly different. The player now has to press the giant Left, Up and Right buttons in a giant pad and step on a footpedal for the 'Down' command while the action buttons (Square, X etc.), are replaced by a giant "Dance!" button. The buttons also have to be pressed in a rhythmic manner or still be counted as a "miss". A Jammer button is also included.

The arcade version features only five stages (Robo-Zs stage always being the last one).

=== Mobile ===
Bust a Move: Mobile Edition is a mobile version that was released in Japan only on April 19, 2004. It requires the software "Square Enix Pocket Action" and a compatible phone such as DoCoMo models P505i/is, SO505i/is, and 900 series. People could use the network to connect to the software and play against each other. The software shut down in the late 2000s.

== Reception ==
=== PlayStation ===
Hyper magazine reviewed the PlayStation game and gave it a 91% score. Next Generation reviewed the Japanese release as an import, rating it four stars out of five, and stated that "Bust-A-Move is definitely an idea whose time has come, and it helps bridge the gap between hardcore gaming and mass culture appeal. It doesn't hurt that it's also a serious blast to play." Next Generation also reviewed the U.S. PlayStation version, rating it four stars out of five, and stated that "Overwhelmingly infectious tunes that have been translated to English for the U.S., hordes of secret dancers, and stages, charming touches such as secondary animations in stages for players who execute tough movies, and a clever, though not entirely unique, concept make Bust-A-Groove a game that deserves to find an audience in the U.S."

=== Arcade ===
In Japan, Game Machine listed Bust a Groove on their April 1, 1999 issue as being the third most-successful dedicated arcade game of the month.
