= Bust a Groove 2 =

1999 video game

- Cover of the NTSC-U/C version of Bust a Groove 2
- Developer: Metro
- Publishers: Square Enix (formerly Enix); Namco (arcade)
- Artist: Hideyuki Tanaka
- Platforms: PlayStation, arcade
- Release: JP: April 15, 1999; NA: August 22, 2000
- Genre: Rhythm
- Modes: Single player, multiplayer

Bust a Groove 2 is a rhythm game developed by Metro and published by Enix for the Sony PlayStation in Japan on April 15, 1999, and in North America on August 22, 2000, and is the sequel to Bust a Groove. The game was originally released in Japan as Bust a Move 2: Dance Tengoku Mix (バスト ア ムーブ2 ダンス天国MIX, Basuto a Mūbu 2: Dansu Tengoku Mix) and was never released in Europe.

The game takes place one year after the previous installment and shares the same overall gameplay. It combines dance moves and special abilities designed to damage the opponent. It also features new songs, new characters and updated costumes for the returning characters retained from the previous game. A third game in the series, Bust a Move: Dance Summit 2001 was only released in Japan on the PlayStation 2.

== Gameplay ==
Bust a Groove 2's gameplay is still the same from the previous title. However, backgrounds had become crazier; if a player attains high scores, background stages will sport crazy effects and changes (see Fever Time).

"The single-player game has changed - it now features branching paths in the single-player game that move you up to more difficult opponents depending on how well you're dancing. The popularity meter has been axed; now your character has a small border around his or her name that changes in color depending on how well you're dancing. Also, a new meter sits in the middle of the screen that tracks every "Cool, Chillin', and Freeze" event and moves up accordingly. When all three bars are filled to capacity, your points are doubled for every dance move made during that time. In Bust a Groove 2 there is a standard two-player versus mode, a practice mode to help you get accustomed to timing the fourth beat, and a dance-view mode that allows you to cycle through each dancer's individual moves and string them together to make your own dances."

The game also included 2 new commands aside the somersault and "Jammer" (attack) moves. This time, the player could now do a 'reflect move' and guard attacks.

=== Fever Time ===
If a player obtains a high score by completing a stage with very few mistakes or missed actions, a special dance solo starring the winner of the round takes place immediately after the round ends. This is known as "Fever Time".

In some cases, both the winner and loser may dance together during a special Fever Time. This occurs if both players were able to finish the stage with high scores.

== Characters ==
The initial characters such as Heat, Hiro, Kelly, Kitty-N, Shorty, Strike, and Capoeira were retained from the original Bust a Groove with several of the original game's characters no longer appearing in Bust a Groove 2, including Frida, Hamm, Gas-O, Pinky and Burger Dog (although Burger Dog makes a cameo in Comet's stage). Several new characters were added: Comet, Bi-O, and Tsutomu.

Some new hidden characters were also introduced into the game, and could be unlocked after completing certain tasks. Pander and Robo-Z Gold are the only hidden characters that have a unique dance style; other hidden characters merely mimicked other characters' dance moves.

=== Main ===
Name	Age	Dance Style	Jammer	Info
Heat	20	Breakdance	A giant flame comes down on the opponent in the shape of a dragon	A former racer who was badly burned in an accident but miraculously survived and gained the power to control fire. However, he still cannot give up his dream of becoming a racer, and aims to return to racing with the power of the Groovetron. His design is based on Akira Fudo from Devilman.
Comet	16	Rollerblade Dance	Using a wand, Comet magically turns the opponent into food or small animals.	The younger sister of Frida, who appeared in the previous game. A waitress at a sushi bar. She currently works 12 part-time jobs and donates all the money she saves to a volunteer organization that works to save endangered animals. Her design is based on the anime character Princess Comet.
Shorty	13	Candy Hip-Hop	A giant cake falls and flattens the opponent	The daughter of a diplomat father and a supermodel mother, she was lonely until her parents gave her Columbo, a mouse that eats anything in his sights. Now she and Columbo dance all day for fun.
Strike	22	Gangsta Walking	Strike takes out his machine gun and starts shooting; the screen "shatters" if the attack connects.	A street gangster. He was finally released from prison and formed a dance group with his ex-prison buddies. This year he made his major debut! However, on his days off he and his buddies rob banks. With the Groovetron, he's trying to gain the power to avoid being caught.
Tsutomu	11	House	Blackboard Eraser Trap	A super rich fifth grader whose parents are a professional baseball player and a member of the National Diet. Because of his mature personality, he is disliked by 99% of the students at the school. He aims to become the next student council president with the power of Groovetron.
Capoeira	Unknown	Capoeira	A mysterious satellite appears above the opponent producing rays of light that shrink the opponent causing them to shrink with oversized bobble heads	The partner aliens Kiki and Lala who came from the planet Capoeira continue their journey in search of every billboard they come across on Earth.
Bi-O	47	Pop-Locking	Using the axe lodged in his head, he removes his head and throws it at the opponent.	He is the father of the mad scientist GAS-O who appeared in the previous game. After fighting with GAS-O, he was sprayed with the latest poison gas and had an axe stabbed in the head, turning him into a zombie. GAS-O is now in prison.
Hiro	21	Disco	An autographed picture of himself crashes is thrown at the opponent	An Italian living in Japan. He moved from the 6 tatami room he lived in until last year to raise the ground. On the weekends, he's really looking forward to going out dancing. He is thinking of using the power of the Groovetron to obtain a hairstyle that will not fall apart even when the wind blows. He is based on Tony Manero from the movie "Saturday Night Fever".
Kitty-N	17	Jazz	A giant crane appears above the opponent and picks them up, later dropping them back down onto the ground	Cosplay idol. She is very busy as the main MC of the new program "Love Love Warrior Kitty is the Best!" (broadcast live from Studio Aota) that starts every day at 1pm! Her real name is Kitty Nakajima, but she doesn't like being called "Nakajima-san."
Kelly	24	Soul Bump & Grind	Kelly reveals a megaphone and screams towards her opponent knocking them out	A sexy foreign trading company executive who loves cosplay. She also added several new costumes this time, which resulted in even more loans. She hopes to somehow get her hands on the Groovetron and pay off the loan in full..

=== Unlockable ===
Name	Age	Dance Style	Jammer	Info
Columbo	Unknown	Cutie Hip-Hop	Similar to Shorty's attack but a pudding falls instead of a cake	A mysterious mouse who can understand human speech. He's very cute and resembles his owner, Shorty. Of course, he dances just like Shorty
Sushi Boy	Unknown	Rollerblade Dance	Same as Comet's	Sushi Boy makes sushi at Sushi Planet, where Comet works part-time. Although he is a robot, he shows off his amazing dancing skills on inline skates. His jammer attack is pretty tough!
McLoad	Unknown	Soul Bump & Grind	Same as Kelly's but he breathes fire instead of shouting in a megaphone	The monster animatronic that appeared in Shorty's stage "Jungle Tours" has come to life with some kind of magic! At first glance, it looks very difficult for him to move, but he actually shows off some nimble dance techniques!!
ChiChi & Sally	Unknown	Capoeira	Same as Capoeira's	A life form that I don't know if it's a pet or something aboard Capoeira's spaceship. Perhaps because they have been traveling together for so long, they has memorized the same moves as Capoeira. Are their tongues too big for their body their charm point?
Michael Doi	34	Jazz	Same as Kitty-N's except the hook Kitty-N uses is blue while Michael's is purple/pink and says "Doi" on it with a heart.	He is Mr. Narcissist! ! Even more than Hiro, he truly believes that he is the most beautiful. He is actually Kitty N's choreography teacher. That doesn't mean you don't have to make yourself look stiff with tight white tights! ?
Hustle Kong	Unknown	Disco	Same as Hiro's but instead of Hiro being in the picture, it's Hustle Kong	Mascot of "Hustle Kong", the club that Hiro frequently visits. Hiro's cool dance ignites the dance spirit of Hustle Kong! As the name suggests, he grabs the hearts of the girls with his powerful dance!
Robo-Z Gold	Unknown	Vogue & African	Robo-Z Gold locks onto the opponent and fires a missile	The terrifying voguing robot, Robo Z, is back in a golden body! As of now, it is unknown why they are targeting Groovetron.
Pander	Unknown	Butoh	Hands appear and flips the screen.	The Hidden boss of the game. A mysterious Japanese dancer that appears in the final stage.

== Songs ==
Song	Artist	Character	Notes
ZOMBIE HOPPER	Kaname	Bi-O	
ALLEGRETTO BREAK	Junichi Tanaka	Capoeira/ChiChi & Salli	
Magic Tower	Tetsutaro Sakurai & Reiko Oda	Comet/Sushi Boy	
Magic Tower	Tetsutaro Sakurai & Lala Moore	Comet/Sushi Boy	American release
The Heat is On	Aaron G.	Heat	
Let The Music Take Control (Hiro's Groove)	Stellar All Stars	Hiro/Hustle Kong	
Moon Light Party ~ Clap Your Hands	DJ Hasebe & Emiko	Kelly/McLoad	
Moon Light Party	DJ Hasebe & Robbie Danzie	Kelly/McLoad	American release
Hello! Kitty-N	Anji	Kitty-N/Michael Doi	
Hello Kitty	Lala Moore	Kitty-N/Michael Doi	American release
Hizashi no oku no happīhāto (ひざしの奥のハッピーハート) (Happy Heart In The Sunshine)	Aie	Shorty/Columbo	
Happy Heart In The Sunshine	Robbie Danzie	Shorty/Columbo	American release
Here Comes Trouble	Masters Of Funk	Strike	
Got To Be Happy	Yukihiro Fukutomi & Momoko Suzuki	Tsutomu	
Acid Line	Joujouka	Robo-Z Gold	
Enka 1	Parts of Console & Michiko Kawai	Pander	

The game also features an opening theme called "High Voltage (Theme Of Bust A Move 2)" by "Stellar All Stars" and an ending theme named "Bust A Groove" by "Black Bottom Brass Band".

== Changes ==
The following are several in-game changes made with the English version of the game. Most noticeable is the change of Hiro's symbol due to the age rating concerns.

- Aside from changing the language the characters speak to English, several announcer voice overs were still changed though they're already in English (e.g. the voice over in the Mode Select screen). Most likely because of the mentioning of "Bust A Move" which is the Japanese title.
- The 2 Player Mode (VS) loading screen was changed.
- The arrows appear to be in different colors while the Japanese only bears yellow arrows.
- Hiro's character symbol is a cigarette in the Japanese version but instead, was changed into I♥ME for the US version.
- The TV Show-esque epilogue, "Dancing Heroes", which shows CG endings of the characters and is hosted by a minor character named "James Suneoka" was entirely removed and instead, only the credits are shown. This may be due to the fact that the endings were already in English and featured numerous inappropriate and sometimes offensive jokes. Prior to the endings, James would say jokes such as needing three more bullets to reunite the Beatles or would get Bi-o's axe stuck in his head with blood squirting out.

== Development ==
The game was in development as early as April 1998.

== Reception ==
Reception

Aggregate scores
Aggregator	Score
GameRankings	70% (9 reviews)
Metacritic	66% (8 reviews)

Review scores
Publication	Score
Famitsu	31 out of 40
GamePro	3.5 out of 5
GameSpot	7.3 out of 10
IGN	6.8 out of 10
Next Generation	3 out of 5

In Japan, Game Machine listed Bust a Groove 2 on their September 1, 1999 issue as being the eleventh most-successful arcade game of the month.

Next Generation reviewed the PlayStation version of the game, rating it three stars out of five, and stated that "Honestly, the whole game just feels like a retread of a past hit with developers who didn't do anything other than milk the success of the last title. The game is definitely fun for a while, but it's really not the evolution of the series we'd hoped for."

Bust a Groove 2, along with its predecessor, is one of the more valuable PlayStation games on the secondary market. For example, complete, used copies sell for more than $100 which is more than the original MSRP of $35.99.
