= Censorship in Jamaica =

Today's Jamaican broadcasting, such as the cable television and radio, is governed by the Jamaica Broadcasting Commission (JBC). JBC aims to regulate and monitor the media industry; more importantly, it runs with full power of the regulation making and the control of the programming’s standard and technical quality. However, broadcasting regulation contains some very vague clauses, like Regulation 30(d) and Regulation 30(l)... which causes more difficult for JBC of dealing with the related issues. Censorship in Jamaica has been reported extensively on the issues of dancehall culture, film, and street art. Broadcasting in Jamaica has been characterized by increased imported foreign media, mostly from United Kingdom or United States.

== The Jamaican broadcast commission ==
The Jamaica broadcasting commission implements two broadcasting laws: the Broadcasting and Radio Re-diffusion Amendment Act and the Television and Sound Broadcasting Regulations. The commission has informally adopted the principles of the Freedom of the Press clause contained in the United States' first amendment. As mentioned earlier, because the commission itself lacks clear legal guidelines, it is hard to analyze the related censored content.

== Dancehall Culture censorship ==
In Jamaica, Dancehall culture acts as communication tool between activists and the government. Lyrics normally involve violence, sexuality, and questions of race. In 2008, “daggering” music and dance were introduced to Jamaica mainstream. Different from other Jamaican dancehall culture, “daggering” involves explicit lyrics that discuss sex and homosexuality. JBC placed a ban in Feb, 6th 2009 on “daggering” music. According to Television and Sound Broadcasting Regulations, the “daggering song” violates provisions of “Regulation 30(d) and Regulation 30(l).

30. No licensee shall permit to be transmitted

d) any indecent or profane matter, so, however, that any broadcast to which regulation 26 relates shall be deemed not to be indecent; Reg. 30(d)

(l) any portrayal of violence which offends against good taste, decency or public morality. Reg. 30(l)

== Film censorship ==
The movie Amistad, directed by Steven Spielberg, had an opening scene in Jamaica that discussed slavery. Due to the Jamaican unique history of colonialism, more than 90 percent of the Caribbean islanders are slaves who originate from West Africa. Considering this slave trade history, the Jamaican Cinematographic Authority thought the scene of a slave ship revolt was inappropriate for Jamaican audiences. Rex Nettleford who is vice chancellor at the University of the West Indies referred to such censorship as "a real disappointment." He thought the government should not use censorship as a tool to control public and conceal historical truths, referring to the instance as a "conspiracy of silence".

== Street art censorship ==
From the Gleaner News: In a recent decade, Jamaica Popular Mural Movement has gone global, the street art mostly paints political figures, community heroes, and religious images. This movement occurs when people cannot meet the basic demand of the society, like employment, health care, and education. An interview of police commissioner on Jamaica's CVM TV discusses how Jamaican police often carry paintbrushes or spray paint to censor what they perceive as dangerous to society. But the removal of the murals can also be seen as a "violent censorship", against the freedom of expression based on the Jamaican Constitution.
