= Hatsumi =

Hatsumi (written:初美, 初見) is both a Japanese surname and a feminine Japanese given name.

Notable people with the surname include:

- Masaaki Hatsumi (初見 良昭; born 1931), Japanese ninjutsu practitioner
- Saki Hatsumi (初美 沙希; born 1990), Japanese pornographic film actress

Notable people with the given include:

- Hatsumi Morinaga (守永 初美; born 1979), Japanese former singer
- Hatsumi Shibata (しばたはつみ; 1952–2010), Japanese singer
- Hatsumi Ueda (上田 初美; born 1988), Japanese shogi player
