= 'ote'a =

Traditional dance from Tahiti

'ote'a group dance

The ʻōteʻa (usually written as otea) is a traditional dance and accompanying music from Tahiti characterized by a rapid hip-shaking motion to percussion accompaniment. The dancers, standing in several rows, may be further choreographed to execute different figures (including tamau, varu, otamu, ami, and fa'arapu) while maintaining the hip-shaking. The hip motion itself may in some choreographies be synchronized amongst multiple dancers and may be further coordinated with the accompanying percussion arrangement.

The dance is with music only (drums) at a fast rhythm, and no singing. The drum can be one of the different types of the tōʻere, a lying log of wood with a longitudinal slit, which is struck by one or two sticks. Additional drum types accompanying the dance may include the ng drum covered with a shark skin and struck by the hands or with sticks) played at a slower rhythm, or the smaller faʻatētē drum.

The ʻōteʻa is one of the few dances which already existed in pre-European times as a male dance. (The hura (Tahitian vernacular for hula), a dance for women, on the other hand has disappeared, and likewise is gone the couple's dance ʻupaʻupa but which may have reemerged as the tāmūrē). Nowadays, however the ʻōteʻa can be danced by men (ʻōteʻa tāne), by women (ʻōteʻa vahine), or by both genders (ʻōteʻa ʻāmui = united ʻō.).

Dancers of the ʻōteʻa make gestures reenacting daily occupations of life. For the men the gestural themes can be chosen from warfare or sailing, and then they may use spears or paddles. For women the gestural themes are typically closer to home or from nature: hand gestures suggesting combing their hair, or the flight of a butterfly. More elaborate themes have been adopted; for example one where the dancers end up in a map of Tahiti, highlighting important places. In a proper ʻōteʻa the story of the theme should pervade the whole dance.

The costumes are extremely elaborate, typically incorporating long plant fiber ("grass") skirts, belting with tassels that accentuate the hip-motion, may further include decorated headpieces, and may be color-coordinated across the dancers of the company.

The same more dress and the same shaking of the knees for the boys and of the hips for the girls as in all Tahitian dances (see tāmūrē) is used here too.

== Modern and adoptive interpretation ==
Interpretations of the ʻōteʻa are frequently included as part of larger Polynesian dance recitals presented at luaus and visitor-oriented live shows in the Hawaiian Islands and other Pacific-rim resorts outside Tahiti.

Modern interpretations include costumes fashioned of contemporary man-made materials (polyester films such as mylar, or synthetic twines) substituting for plant-fiber or natural materials, and costume coloration such as fluorescent pinks and greens or mirror-reflective surfaces difficult to obtain or maintain from purely natural resources.

Modern drum accompaniments may include drums of European or non-Pacific construction, improvised percussion instruments of modern materials (e.g. high-density polyethylene or metallic commercial food packaging), and the use of prerecorded drum reinforcement soundtracks.

== See also ==
- Polynesian culture
