= Surra de Bunda =

Brazilian dance move

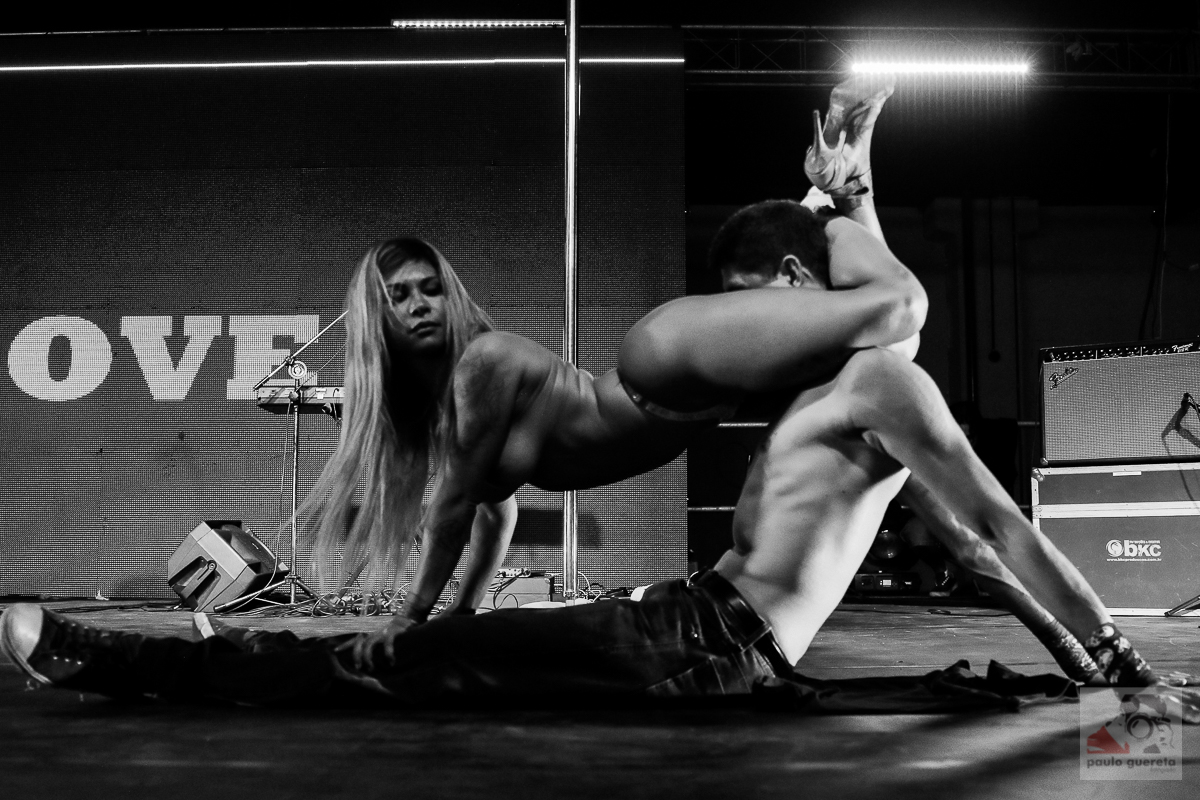
Surra de Bunda at Erótika Fair 2016

The Surra de Bunda is a dance move by the group Tequileiras do Funk, from São José dos Campos, São Paulo, Brazil, which involves a female dancer "beating" her buttocks into a man's face, potentially leading to concussion. It is best known outside Brazil as the subject of a brief wave of internet reporting in 2010. The phrase Surra de Bunda in Brazilian Portuguese loosely means "butt beat", "butt pounding" or, more accurately, "punishment by ass". Some individuals enjoy the punishment, whilst others cry in misery.

== Background ==
During the groups' performance, male audience members are invited onto the stage, and will sit down onto a chair placed in front of the audience. Bikini-clad dancers will then lap-dance the men, and eventually kneel in front of them with their buttocks facing the men. Often the dancers will place their ankles on the man's shoulders so that their legs will be locked onto the men's shoulders. At this point, the dancers will begin to slam the male's face into their buttocks, matching the rhythm of the song that is currently playing. By mid-2010, the dance began to spread with online videos of the dance, with other dancers reportedly adopting it, and clips were broadcast on some Brazilian television outlets. The dance was intended to be humorous.

== See also ==
- Funk carioca
- Daggering
- Twerking
