= Lordosis behavior =

Body posture in mammals for sexual receptivity

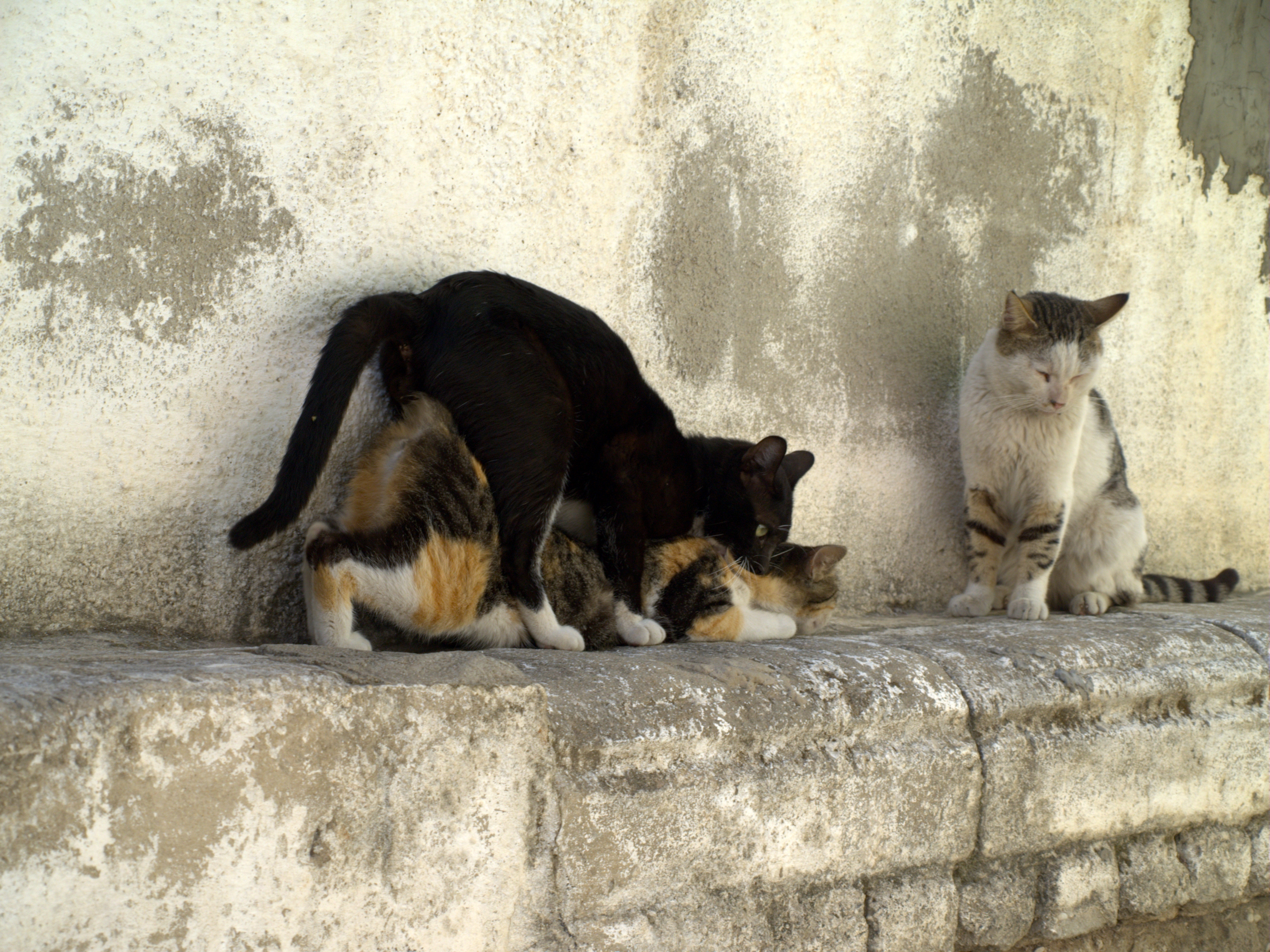
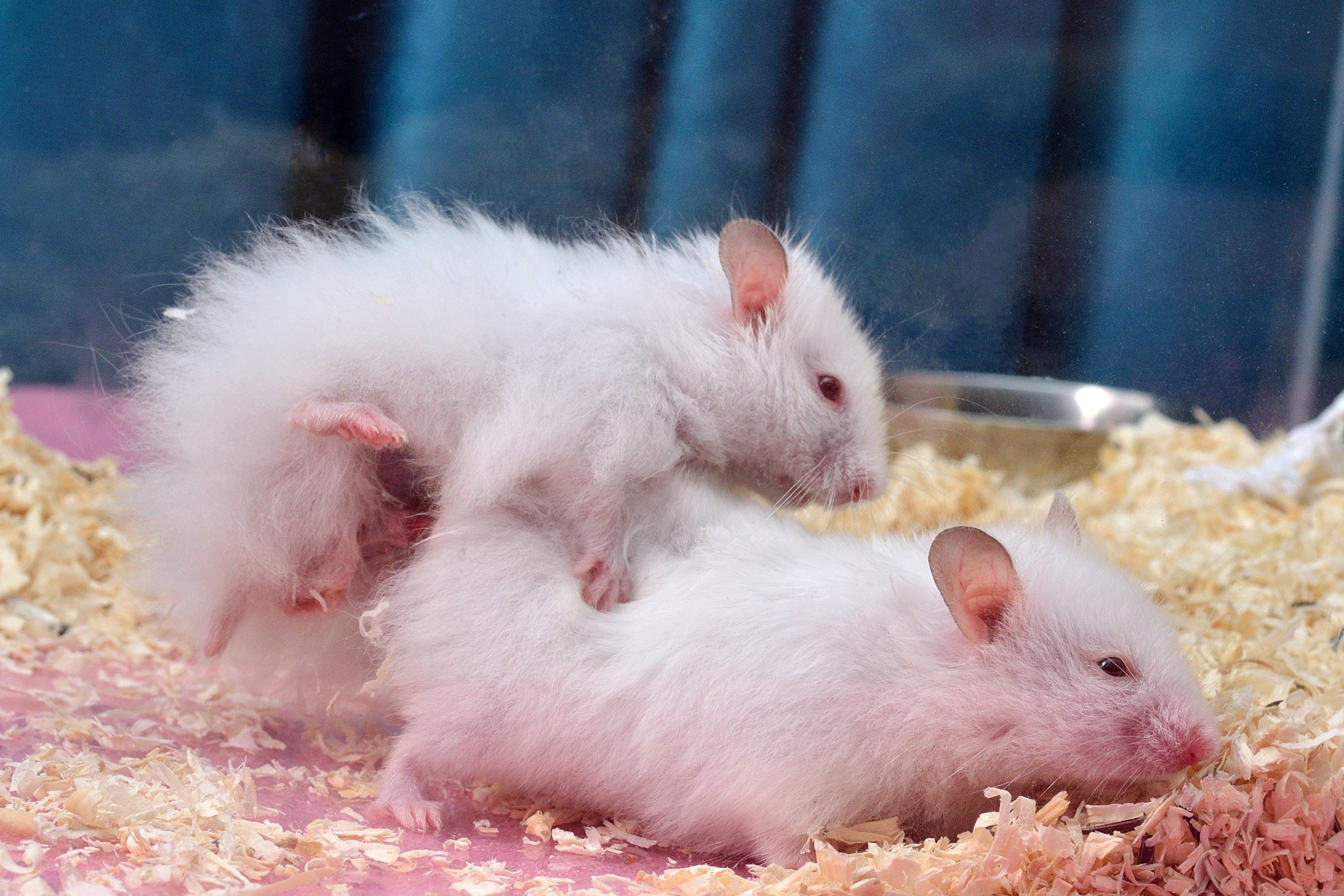
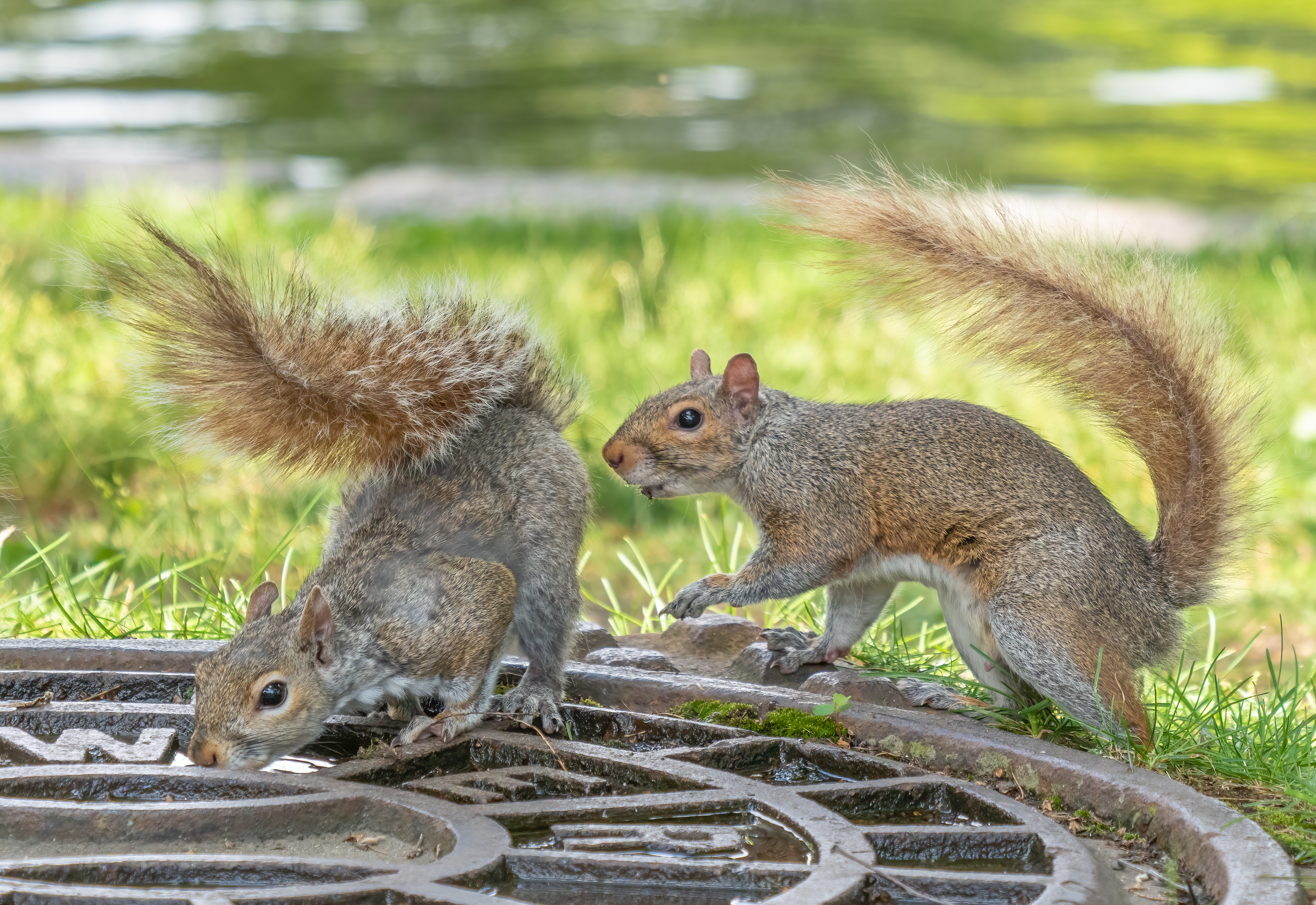
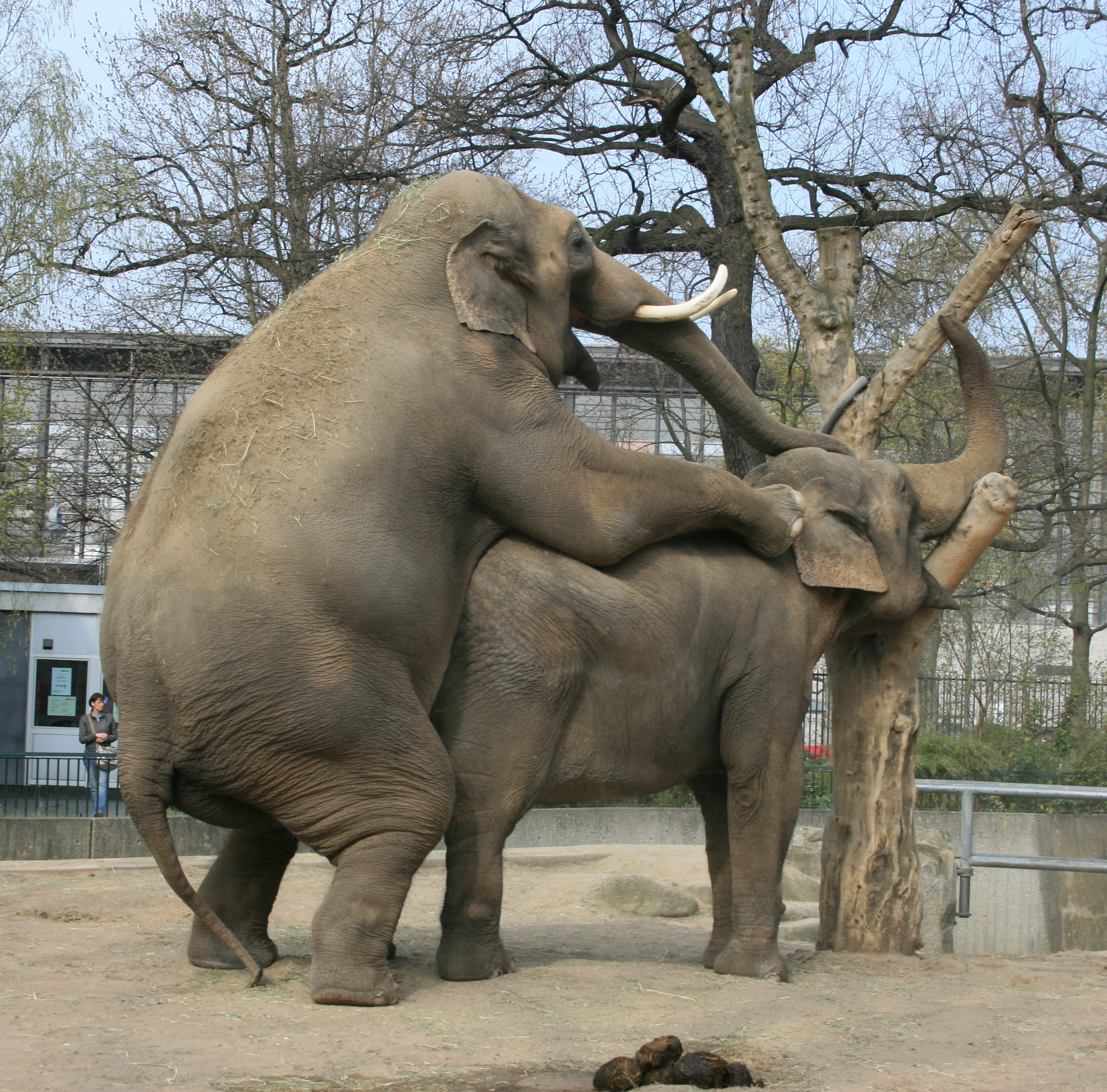
Lordosis behavior seen in different mammals. Clockwise from top left: cats, hamsters, elephants, and eastern gray squirrels.

Lordosis behavior (/lɔːrˈdoʊsɪs/), also known as mammalian lordosis (Greek lordōsis, from lordos "bent backward") or presenting, is the naturally occurring body posture for sexual receptivity to copulation present in females of most mammals including rodents, elephants, and cats. The primary characteristics of the behavior are a lowering of the forelimbs but with the rear limbs extended and hips raised, ventral arching of the spine and a raising, or sideward displacement, of the tail. During lordosis, the spine curves dorsoventrally so that its apex points towards the abdomen.

== Description ==
Lordosis is a reflex action that causes many non-primate female mammals to adopt a body position that is often crucial to reproductive behavior. The posture moves the pelvic tilt in an anterior direction, with the posterior pelvis rising up, the bottom angling backward and the front angling downward. Lordosis aids in copulation as it elevates the hips, thereby facilitating penetration by the penis. It is commonly seen in female mammals during estrus (being "in heat"). Lordosis occurs during copulation itself and in some species, like the cat, during pre-copulatory behavior.

== Neurobiology ==
The lordosis reflex arc is hardwired in the spinal cord, at the level of the lumbar and sacral vertebrae (L1, L2, L5, L6 and S1). In the brain, several regions modulate the lordosis reflex. The vestibular nuclei and the cerebellum, via the vestibular tract, send information which makes it possible to coordinate the lordosis reflex with postural balance. More importantly, the ventromedial hypothalamus sends projections that inhibit the reflex at the spinal level, so it is not activated at all times. Sex hormones control reproduction and coordinate sexual activity with the physiological state. Schematically, at the breeding season, and when an ovum is available, hormones (especially estrogen) simultaneously induce ovulation and estrus (heat). Under the action of estrogen in the hypothalamus, the lordosis reflex is uninhibited. The female is ready for copulation and fertilization.

When a male mammal mounts the female, tactile stimuli on the flanks, the perineum and the rump of the female are transmitted via the sensory nerves in the spinal cord. In the spinal cord and lower brainstem, they are integrated with the information coming from the brain, and then, in general, a nerve impulse is transmitted to the muscles via the motor nerves. The contraction of the longissimus and transverso-spinalis muscles causes the ventral arching of the vertebral column.

== Hormonal and cerebral regulation ==
Sexual behaviour is optimized for reproduction, and the hypothalamus is the key brain area which regulates and coordinates the physiological and behavioural aspects of reproduction. Most of the time, the ventromedial nucleus of the hypothalamus (VMN) inhibits lordosis. But when environmental conditions are favorable and the female is in estrus, the estrogen hormone, estradiol, induces sexual receptivity by the neurons in the ventromedial nucleus, the periaqueductal gray, and other areas of the brain. The ventromedial hypothalamus sends impulses down axons synapsing with neurons in the periaqueductal gray. These convey an impulse to neurons in the medullary reticular formation which project down the reticulospinal tract and synapse with the neurobiological circuits of the lordosis reflex in the spinal cord (L1–L6). These neurobiological processes induced by estradiol enable the tactile stimuli to trigger lordosis.

The mechanisms of regulation of this estrogen-dependent lordosis reflex have been identified through different types of experiments. When the VMN is lesioned lordosis is abolished; this suggests the importance of this cerebral structure in the regulation of lordosis. Concerning hormones, displays of lordosis can be affected by ovariectomy, injections of estradiol benzoate and progesterone, or exposure to stress during puberty. Specifically, stress can suppress the hypothalamic-pituitary-gonadal (HPG) axis and therefore decrease concentrations of gonadal hormones. Consequently, these reductions in exposure to gonadal hormones around puberty can result in decreases in sexual behavior in adulthood, including displays of lordosis.

== In humans ==
While lordosis behavior has not been observed in humans, positions similar to lordosis can be seen in those being mounted from behind, with the autonomous lordosis reflex replaced by a conscious decision to expose the vulva or anus for penetration.

In a 2017 study, using 3D models and eye-tracking technology it is shown that the slight thrusting out of a woman's hips influences how attractive others perceive her to be and captures the gaze of both men and women. The authors argue "while reflexive lordosis posture is not exhibited by human females and receptivity is not passive or obligatory for them, a manifestation of lumbar curvature might serve as a vestigial remnant of proceptivity-/receptivity-communicative signal between men and women". Previously, anthropologist Helen Fisher also speculated that when a human female wears high-heeled footwear the buttocks thrusts out and the back arches into a pose that simulates lordosis behavior, which is why high heels are considered "sexy". Recent evidence has also supported the perception of sexual receptivity in women when arching the back in supine and quadruped poses. Researchers have found that women perceive other women exhibiting this posture as a potential threat to their romantic relationship.

== See also ==
- Ethogram
- Pelvic thrust
- Twerking
