= Booty shake =

Dance move

The booty shake or booty shaking is a generic term for sexually suggestive dance moves that involve fast movements of pelvis. Originating in African dances, booty shaking was brought by African slaves to the United States and other places, and now it is commonly seen at the dance floor. This move is a part of a number particular dances, of which twerking has become a viral international sensation after being performed by Miley Cyrus in 2013. Colloquial expressions, such as "shake your booty" or "shake your ass" refer to this dance move. "Booty-shaking music" is music that makes people to shake their booties.

There is no particular choreography for the move, and as music writer Cristina Jerome puts it, it is "a move that even someone with two left feet can’t screw up".

Dances and dance moves that involve "booty shaking" include mapalé, the gouyad move in méringue of Haiti, "vacunao" ("vaccinate") move of Guaguancó, Cuba, "winin'" (Jamaica), (Note: "...places a strong emphasis on circular or isolated hip motions known as “winin.”"), "ventilateur" (Senegal) (Note: "ventilateur ('electric fan', which describes the motion of the buttocks swirling suggestively)"), Niiko (Somalia), kwassa kwassa, zingué (Cameroon), mapouka (Note: "In the early 2000s, the Cameroonian government had placed bans on certain “indecent” dances such as the zingue and mapouka,), m'alayah.

== Gallery ==
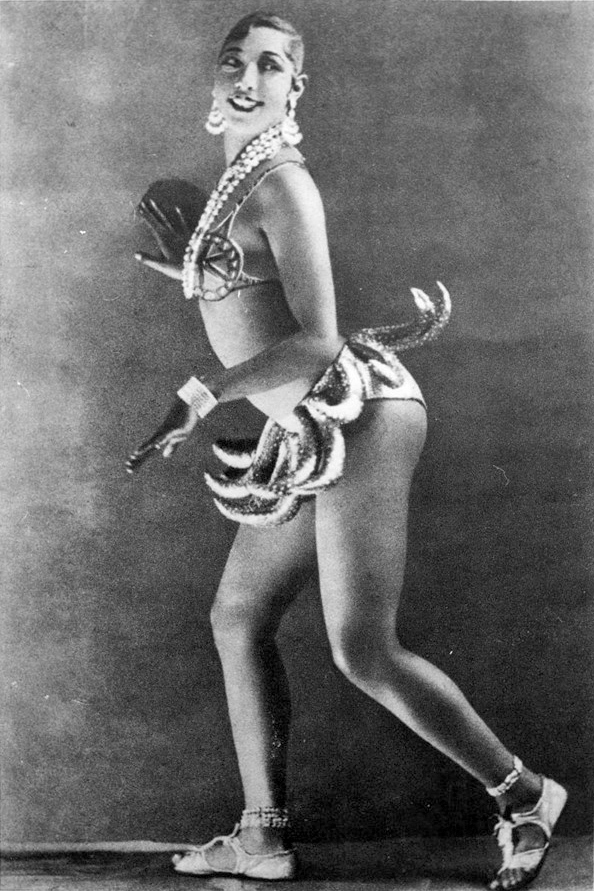
Josephine Baker's Banana Dance Another clip

'ote'a

Twerking

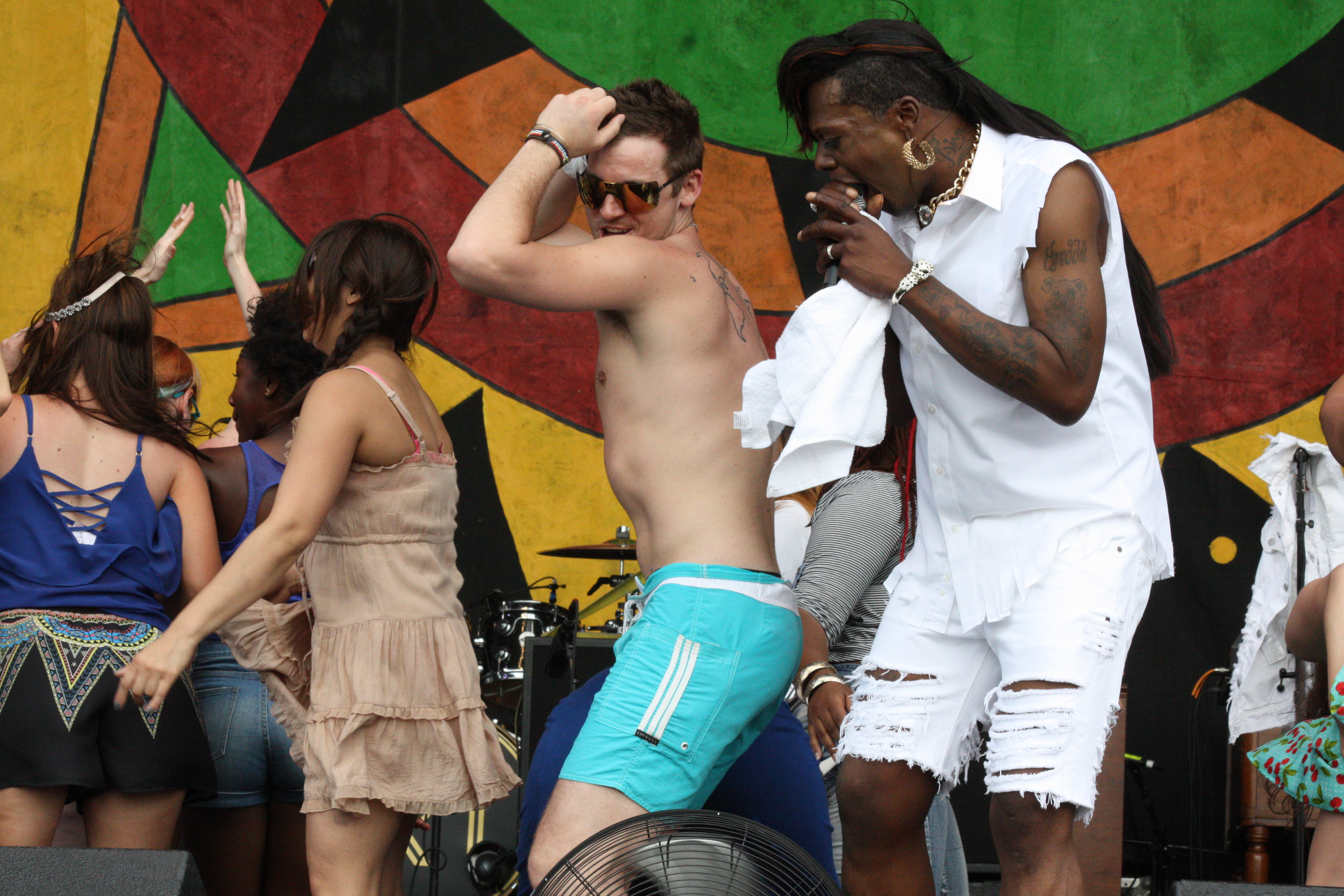
Big Freedia booty shaking contest

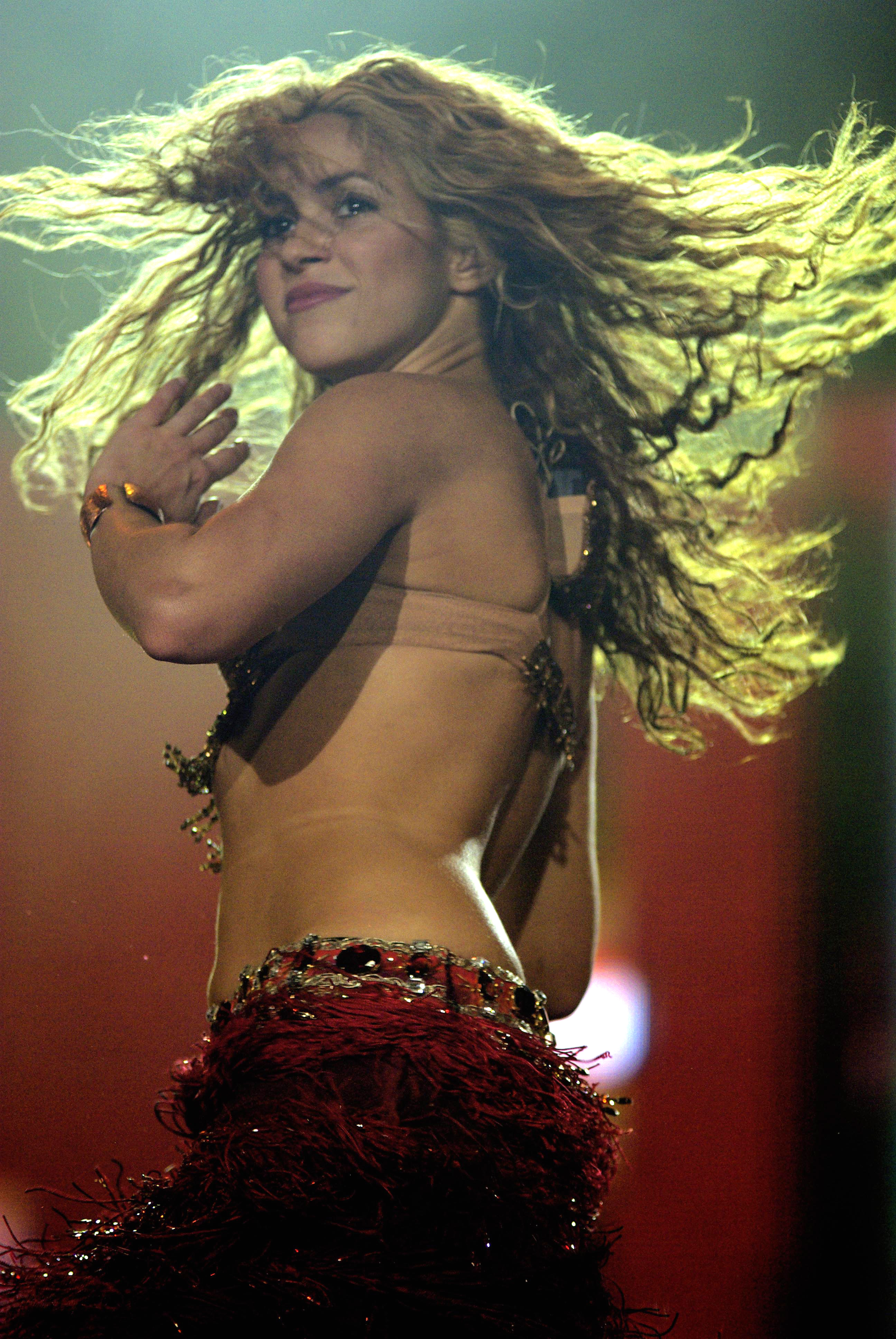
Hip-shaking by Shakira

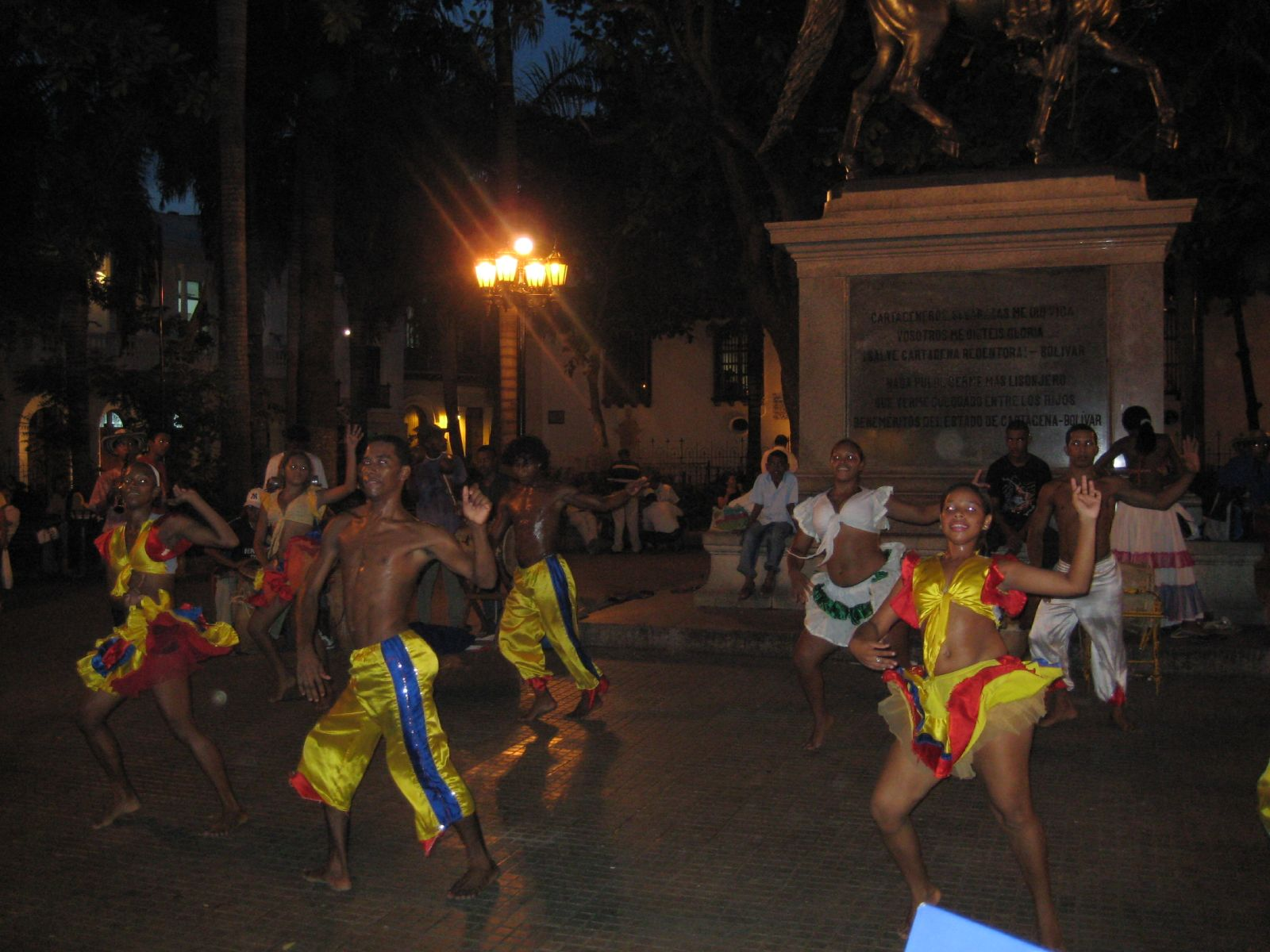
Mapalé

== See also ==
- Belly dance
- Erotic dance
- Ndombolo
- Tamure
- Twerking
- Umbigada (from Portuguese umbigo, "navel"), sometimes translated as "belly bump"
