= Niiko =

Dance practiced by the Gosha

Niiko is a type of dance practiced by the Somali Bantus who are an Ethnic minority of foreign descent in Somalia. Due to its sensual nature it is more often done by non-practicing Muslims and eschewed by those who are religiously observant, and Somalis in general.

Associate [Niiko] with the minority Bantu, who are descended from pre-Somali populations and recent immigrant eastern Swahili groups originally brought to Somalia as slaves... Niiko is therefore not necessarily an authentic Somali dance, but one that has been appropriated from minority cultures of African and slave descent.

— Giulia Liberatore, Somali, Muslim, British: Striving In Securitized Britain
