= Tambor de Crioula =

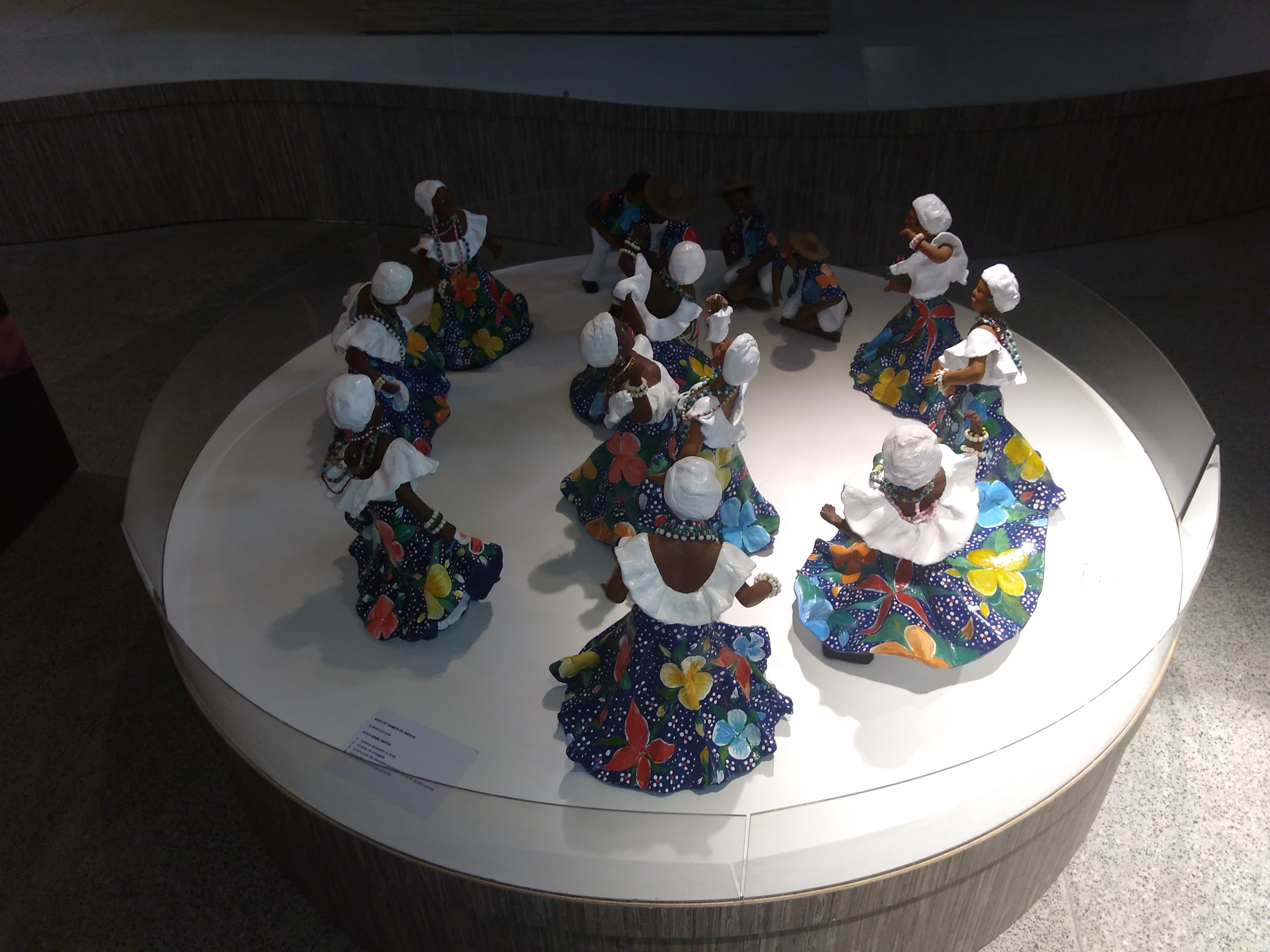
Exhibition at the House of Tambor de Crioula, representing women dancing with their typical clothes.

Tambor de Crioula is a form of expression of Afro-Brazilian Culture in the state of Maranhão, in Brazil, that involves circular dancing, singing and percussion of drums (tambores, in Portuguese).

This Afro-Brazilian manifestation occurs in most of the municipalities of Maranhão, involving a female circular dance, singing and percussion of drums.

The Tambor de Crioula was recognized as Brazilian Intangible Cultural Heritage in 2007 by IPHAN.

== Tradictions ==
Whether outdoors, in the squares, inside the terreiros, or associated with other events and manifestations, it is carried out without specific location or fixed schedule and practiced especially in praise of St. Benedict (the black saint).

It is a circular dance marked by the percussion of three handmade drums (parelhas) covered in leather and tuned by fire and played by men (coureiros). The women (coureiras) with their beautiful round and colored skirts dance in a very peculiar choreography marked by the "punga" or "umbigada"

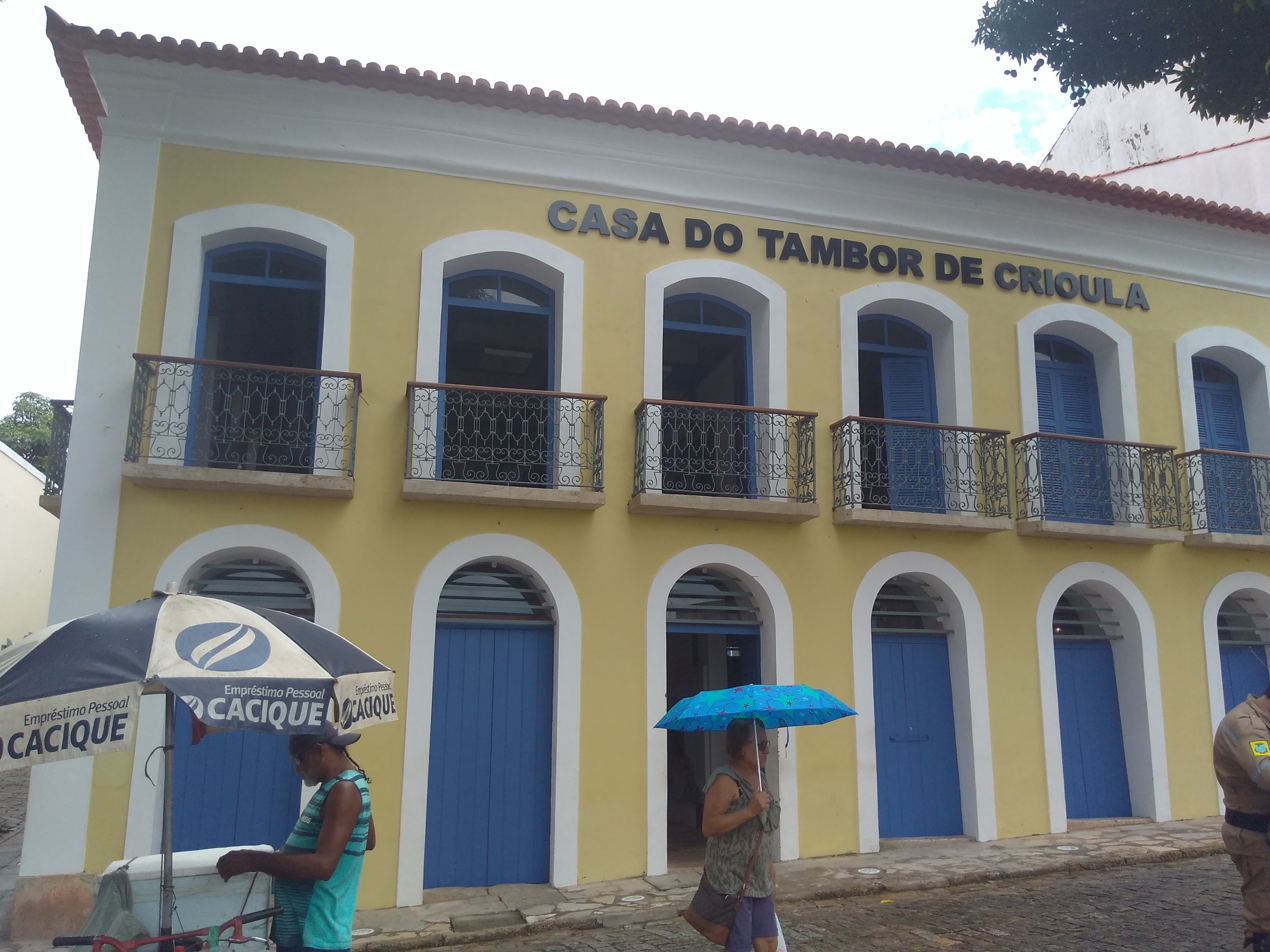
The House of Tambor de Crioula

Other cultural manifestations typical of Maranhão are bumba-meu-boi and cacuriá.

== Museum ==
In 2018, in the city of São Luís, capital of Maranhão, was founded the House of Tambor de Crioula (Casa do Tambor de Crioula), a museum dedicated to the preservation of the memory and tradition of this cultural expression, functioning as a research and documentation center and for the diffusion of dance, with a place for presentations.
