= Hatsumi Morinaga =

Japanese singer

- 守永 初美
- Born: January 4, 1979 (age 47); Nagoya, Aichi Prefecture, Japan
- Occupation: Singer
- Musical career
- Genre: J-pop
- Instrument: Vocals
- Years active: 1997–1998
- Label: Avex Trax

Hatsumi Morinaga (守永 初美, Morinaga Hatsumi) (born January 4, 1979) is a former singer from Nagoya, Aichi Prefecture, Japan.

== Musical career ==
From a young age, Morinaga had the desire to become a singer. She was able to showcase her talents on the television program Asayan, in 1997, where she stood out among the other contestants. It was after this that record producers offered her the opportunity to launch her music career.

Her debut single, "Aozora no Knife", featured in the dance rhythm game Bust a Move, gained her worldwide recognition among fans of the game.

Morinaga retired from the music industry after her third and last single.

== Discography ==
=== Singles ===
1. "Aozora no Knife" (青空のknife) (28 January 1998)
2. "Kakumei Mitai na Kanjou" (革命みたいな感情) (2 September 1998)
3. "Save Our Song" (2 December 1998)
