= Daggering =

Sexually explicit dance form from Jamaica

Daggering is a form of dance originating from Jamaica. The dance incorporates the male dancer ramming his crotch area into the female dancer's buttocks (or vice versa), and other forms of frantic movement. Daggering is not a traditional dance; it is of recent origin, associated with the 2006 wave of dancehall music.

== History ==
The activity of "daggering" has been present in Jamaica's dancehalls for many years, but only since 2006 has the term "daggering" been used as a description. Some argue that it is roughly the equivalent of the Caribbean’s "cabin stabbing", another style of music and dance. Mojo magazine journalist and reggae historian David Katz attributes the recent popularity of daggering to a series of dancehall music videos and artists that promoted the style. YouTube videos of people performing daggering have spread the trend worldwide.

== Daggering music ==
Daggering is performed with dancehall music, although some artists have specifically created "daggering" music:

- Aidonia
- Dexta Daps
- Ding Dong
- Major Lazer
- Mavado
- Mr. Vegas
- Popcaan
- Shenseea
- Spice
- Vybz Kartel

== Ban in Jamaica ==
In the wake of the popularity of daggering, in 2009 the Jamaican government enacted a radio and TV ban on songs and videos with blatantly sexual content. The Jamaica Broadcasting Corporation defines daggering as "a colloquial term or phrase used in dancehall culture as a reference to hardcore sex or what is popularly referred to as 'dry' sex, or the activities of persons engaged in the public simulation of various sexual acts and positions." Therefore, "There shall not be transmitted, any recording, live song, or music video which promotes the act of daggering or which makes reference to, or is otherwise suggestive of daggering."

The Caribbean Quarterly reported in 2016 that Jamaican doctors have also warned of the dangers of daggering, after having many cases of damaged penis tissue. The condition can result in permanent damage, and therefore must be taken seriously. Jamaican doctors assert that those trying to replicate the powerful moves of daggering in the bedroom can end up with dramatic injuries. In 2009, Newsweek reported an article in the Jamaican Star which had stated that the incidence of broken penises has increased in the past year.

The community is divided over the dance, with singers up in arms over the ban, saying it stifles their right to free speech and diversity. Andrei Laskatelev argues that in social history numerous dances have been banned (the belly dance, the tango, the waltz etc.) and that public concern about daggering stems mostly from its novelty.

== See also ==
- Surra de Bunda
- Grinding
- Twerking
