= Bump (dance) =

Type of dance

The Bump (also referred to as the hip bump due to its action) is a form of popular dance introduced in the 1970s in the United States. Two partners, generally one male and one female, bump their hips against each other to the beat of the song. The Bump is often believed to be the precursor to the erotic and controversial dance grinding. It is also known as the disco couple dance.

== Sources ==
- Pruter, Robert (1992). Chicago Soul. University of Illinois Press. p. 208. ISBN 978-0-252-06259-9.
- Smith, Karen Lynn (2010). Popular dance : from ballroom to hip-hop. New York: Chelsea House Publishers. p. 133. ISBN 978-1-4381-3476-5. OCLC 650092426.
- Smitherman, Geneva (1994). Black talk : words and phrases from the hood to the amen corner. Boston: Houghton Mifflin. ISBN 0-395-67410-7. OCLC 29792698.
