= Tamure =

Dance from Tahiti and the Cook Islands

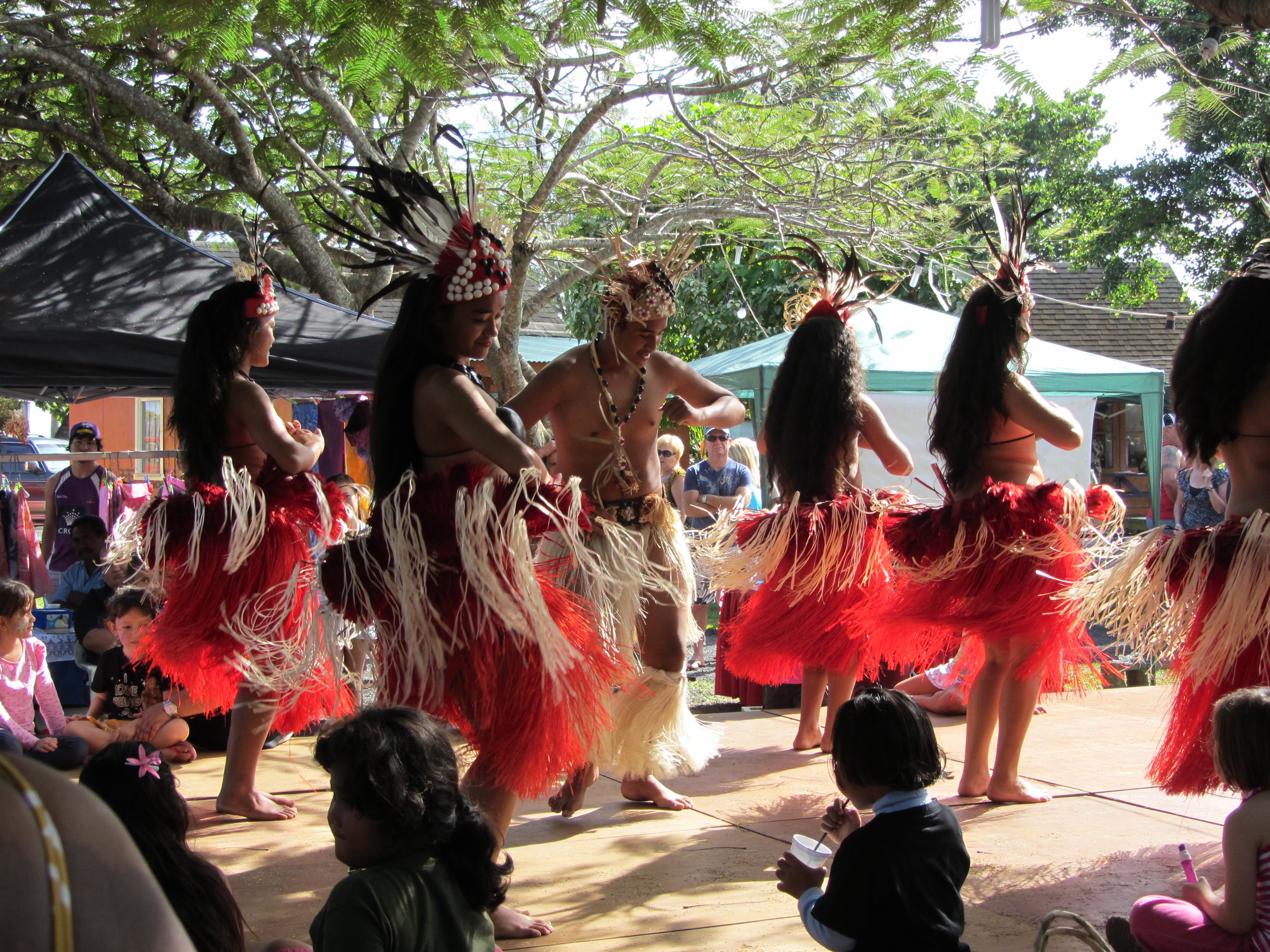
Dance troupe performing in the Cook Islands

The tāmūrē, or tamouré as popularized in many 1960s recordings, is a dance from Tahiti and the Cook Islands. Usually danced as a group of boys and girls, all dressed in more (the Tahitian grass skirt, however not made of grass but of the fibers from the bark of the pūrau, "hibiscus").

The boys shake their knees (as scissors, from there the use of the word pāʻoti (scissors) for this movement), and the girls shake their hips (and their long, loose hair, if they have it). In reality the movement of their knees is the engine which drives their hips.

Their feet should stay flat on the ground and their shoulders should remain stationary. However traditionally in the Ote'a or Ura Pa'u, the hips in Tahiti are shaken round and round (in what is known as the fa'arapu) while in the Cook Islands, the hips are in a side-to-side movement. But due to the tamure, this emphasis is less important.

The movements of the hands is of secondary importance. The girls are largely standing still, the boys move around their partner, either facing her in front or hiding behind her back (as seen from the public). The tempo of the music is continuously increased up to the point where only the most experienced and fittest dancers can keep their shakings up. Depending on the performers, the sexual innuendo may be more or less obvious. The predecessor of the tāmūrē, the traditional ʻupaʻupa was outlawed by the LMS missionaries for that reason. Tāmūrē is a foreign word, the name of a fish in the Tuamotu, the real name of the dance is ʻori Tahiti (Tahitian dance).

Shortly after the World War II a soldier of the Pacific battalion, Louis Martin, wrote a song on a classic rhythm in which he used the word tāmūrē quite often as a tra-la-la. He afterward was known as Tāmūrē Martin, and a new genre was born.
