= Grinding (dance) =

Suggestive club dancing

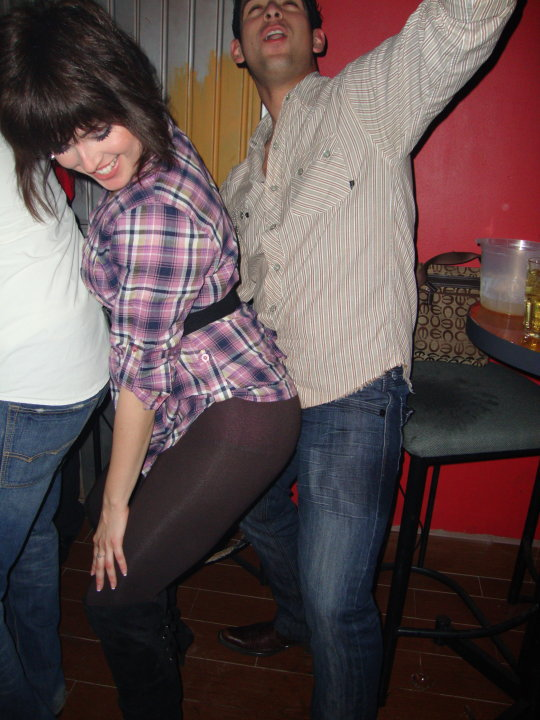
A man and woman grinding.

Grinding, also known as juking, freak dancing or freaking (in the Anglophone Caribbean, wining) is an intimate and romantic close partner dance where two or more dancers rub or bump their bodies against each other, most often with a female dancer rubbing or bumping her buttocks against the crotch of a male dancer, repeatedly making friction against his genitals. The male dancer will typically place his hands on the female dancer's hips, buttocks, or waist.

While this form of dancing has been seen for over a century, first appearing as the “bump and grind” striptease dance performed by burlesque dancers, it only gained mainstream and widespread popularity as a hip hop dance in night clubs, and eventually became popular at high school dances and proms in the US and Canada where it has garnered controversy and has resulted in attempted bans. A more graphic version called daggering involves a man slamming his genital area into a woman's buttocks.

== See also ==
- Bump (dance)
- Frottage
- Sandungueo
- Twerking
