= Umbigada =

Dance move

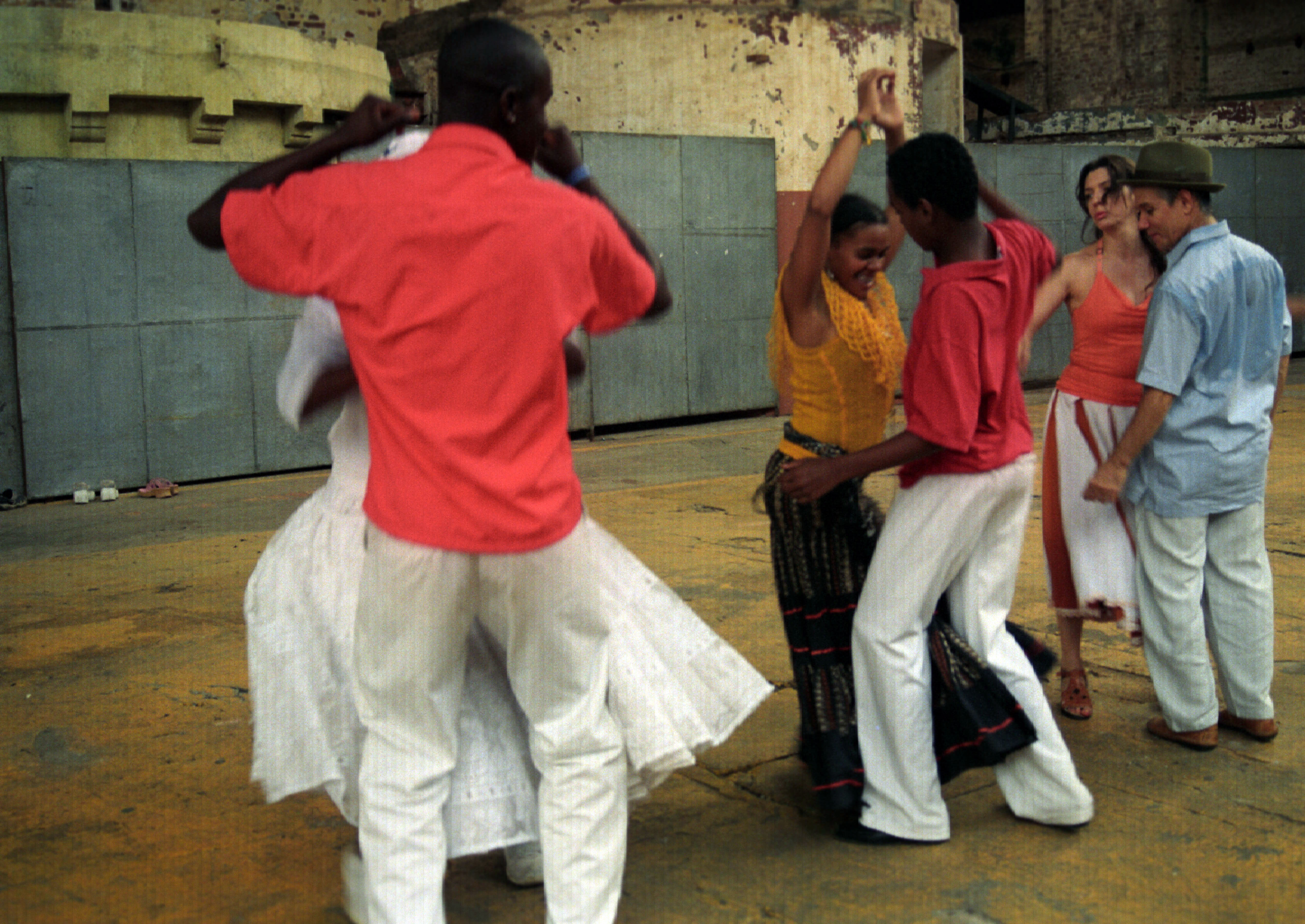
Demonstration of the umbigada dance move in the TV show "Danças Brasileiras", hosted by Antonio Nóbrega.

Umbigada (from Portuguese umbigo, "navel"), sometimes translated as "belly bump" or "belly blow", is a dance move in various Afro-Brazilian dances. It is seen as a "basic feature of many dances imported to Brazil and Portugal from the Congo-Angola region", for example, samba, fandango, batuque, creole drum.

It is performed as follows: a dancer opens her arms and extends her navel towards another dancer. The bodies of the two dancers may, or may not touch.

It is commonly used as an invitation to dance, e.g., during samba de roda ("samba in circle"). However it may also constitute an element of the dance itself.

== See also ==
- Booty shake

== Bibliography ==
- Ralph Waddey, "Viola de Samba" and "Samba de Viola" in the "Reconcavo" of Bahia (Brazil) Part II: "Samba de Viola", Latin American Music Review / Revista de Música Latinoamericana, Vol. 2, No. 2 (Autumn - Winter, 1981), pp. 252-279doi:10.2307/779940
