= 'upa'upa =

Traditional dance from Tahiti

The ʼupaʼupa (often written as upa upa) is a traditional dance from Tahiti. It was mentioned by European explorers, who described it as very indecent. It is not quite clear how similar the gestures at that time were with the now immensely popular tāmūrē. In both dances the performers form groups of pairs of a boy and a girl, dancing more or less in sexually oriented movements.

The musical setting usually includes voice, flute, and drums.

== History ==
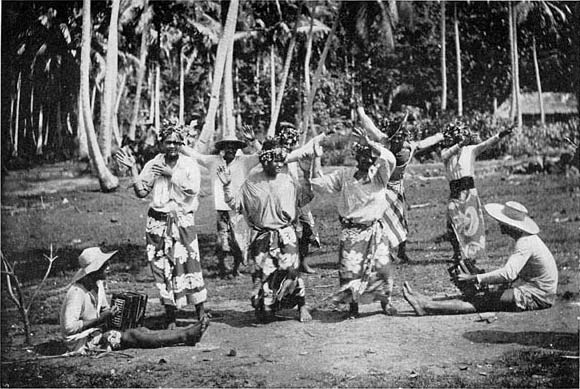
A ʼupaʼupa around 1900

After having arrived on Tahiti in 1797, the LMS missionaries quickly intimidated the local rulers of the island and fixed themselves in a position of power. Although this enabled them to abolish such habits as infanticide, cannibalism and tribal wars, it also enabled them to introduce the idea of sin, which was unknown on Tahiti until then. The joy of dancing, so dear to the Polynesian heart, was one of the first to be axed. The famous Pōmare code of 1819 declared the ʼupaʼupa (and tattooing in the same line) to be bad and immoral habitudes, severely to be opposed. The Leewards followed suit soon after. But dancing continued in secret.

In the code of 1842 many restrictions were relaxed, but the ʼupaʼupa (the general term for dancing then) remained on the black list. In the same year the French proclaimed the protectorate. Being Catholic with some broader views on life than the Protestants, and considering that "if you cannot beat them, join them", they proclaimed in the official bulletin of 1849 that the ʼupaʼupa was still forbidden, except on public feastdays, but then still without the indecent gestures. The act of 1853, repeated in 1876 was more restrictive. In the hope that the Tahitians would spend their time on more pious occupations than dancing and drinking, a system of licenses was introduced. A license could only be obtained by a chef and only on Saturday evenings.

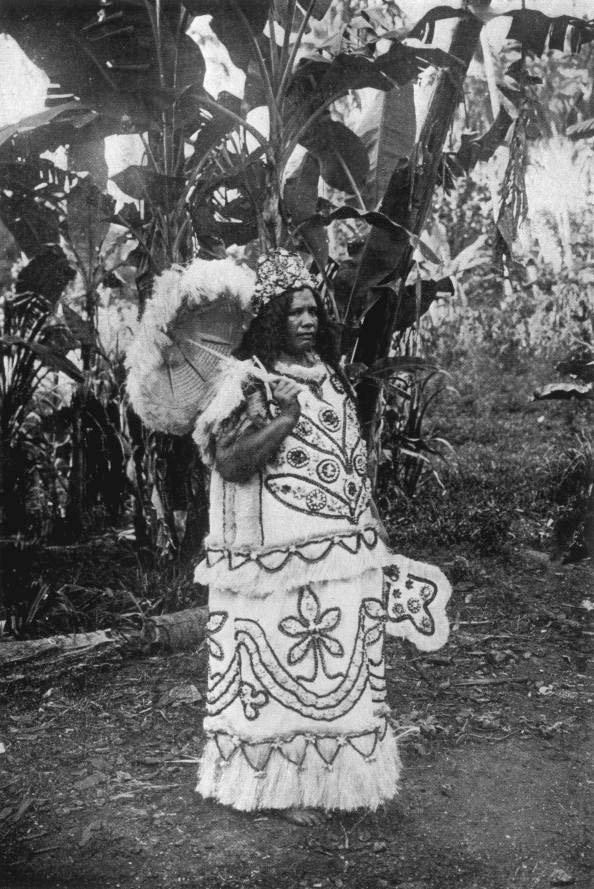
Costume in 1909

Despite all these restrictions, dancing went on, less secret or more secret depending on the law at that moment. Nevertheless, many years of suppression had left a mark on it, and although the idea and the steps were still there, the ʼupaʼupa of the old did not really exist anymore.

In the beginning of the 20th century Tahitian dances were only performed on such festivities as 14 July and saw an evolution into what they have become nowadays. Around 1900 the traditional costumes came back, and although they still looked more like mother Hubbard dresses or ponchos, at least they were made of traditional materials. Around 1920 strips of raffia were added, which soon would develop into the characteristic more or grass skirt (in reality made from hibiscus fibers) of Tahiti. The bare torso (for men only) became acceptable. Prizes started to be awarded to the best dancers on a festival. But it was not until 1956 that Madeleine Mouʼa organised a dance group, called the heiva, of which Teriʼi and Takau, daughters of the last queen of Tahiti became patrons. Finally then traditional dancing had the blessing from the establishment.

The opening of Faaʼa International Airport in 1961 and the real start of the tourist industry on Tahiti made all the dances which had come forth from the ʼupaʼupa a part of daily life once more.

== See also ==
- List of dances
