= Video games in China =

China's video game industry

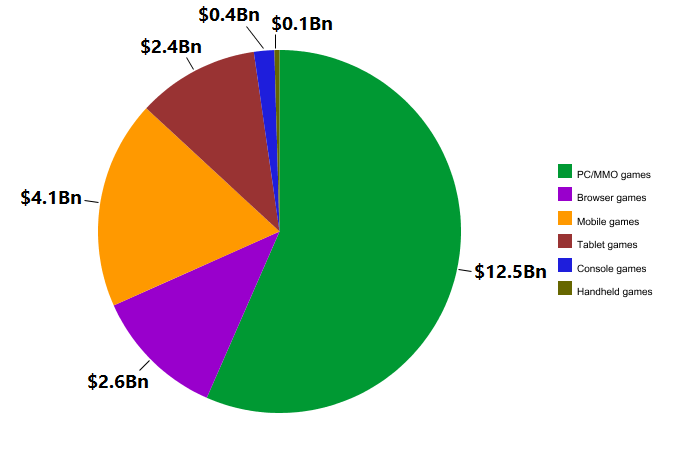
Games market of China by revenue per platform in 2015

The video game industry in China currently is one of the major markets for the global video game industry, where more than half a billion people play video games. Revenues from China make up around 25% of the nearly US$100 billion global video game industry as of 2018. Since 2015, China has exceeded the contribution to the global market from the United States. Because of its market size, China has been described as the "Games Industry Capital of the World" and is home to some of the largest video game companies. China has also been a major factor in the growth of esports, both in player talent and in revenue.

China has not always been a major factor in the industry, having been on the verge of economic recovery during the industry's formulative years in the 1970s and 1980s. With the introduction of the second-generation home gaming consoles in the mid-1980s, a new black market of illegally-imported goods and video game clones arose to avoid the high costs of imports, driving away foreign companies. Notably, China imposed a near-complete ban on video game consoles in 2000, fearing the addiction-like impact of games on its youths; the ban was ultimately lifted in 2015. During that time, China's video game market greatly expanded in the area of computer games (including massively multiplayer online games, browser games, social network games, etc.) and later mobile games, all which could be free to play titles with monetization to appeal to the average lower income of Chinese players. This massive growth from 2007 to 2013 led the games' publishers and operating companies like Tencent and NetEase to become large global companies. Despite the legitimate growth of the industry, China's video game market continues to be offset by illegal importing, copyright violation and intellectual property theft.

As with other parts of its media, China's government has strong oversight of the video game industry; all new titles go through a governmental approval process to assure that content aligns with the nation's values. In 2018, an approvals freeze due to the reorganisation of China's content vetting agencies caused numerous game releases to be held up. The video game market plummeted for a year. The government also fears the potential for its youths to become addicted to video games, and have required games to include anti-addiction measures. User verification is used to enforce playtime restrictions, which currently limit minors to three hours per week.

== History ==
Broadly, the growth of the video game market in China is tied to expansion of its technology and digital economy from the 1990s to present day, which by 2016 represented over 30% of its gross domestic product.

=== Initial growth (1980s–2000) ===
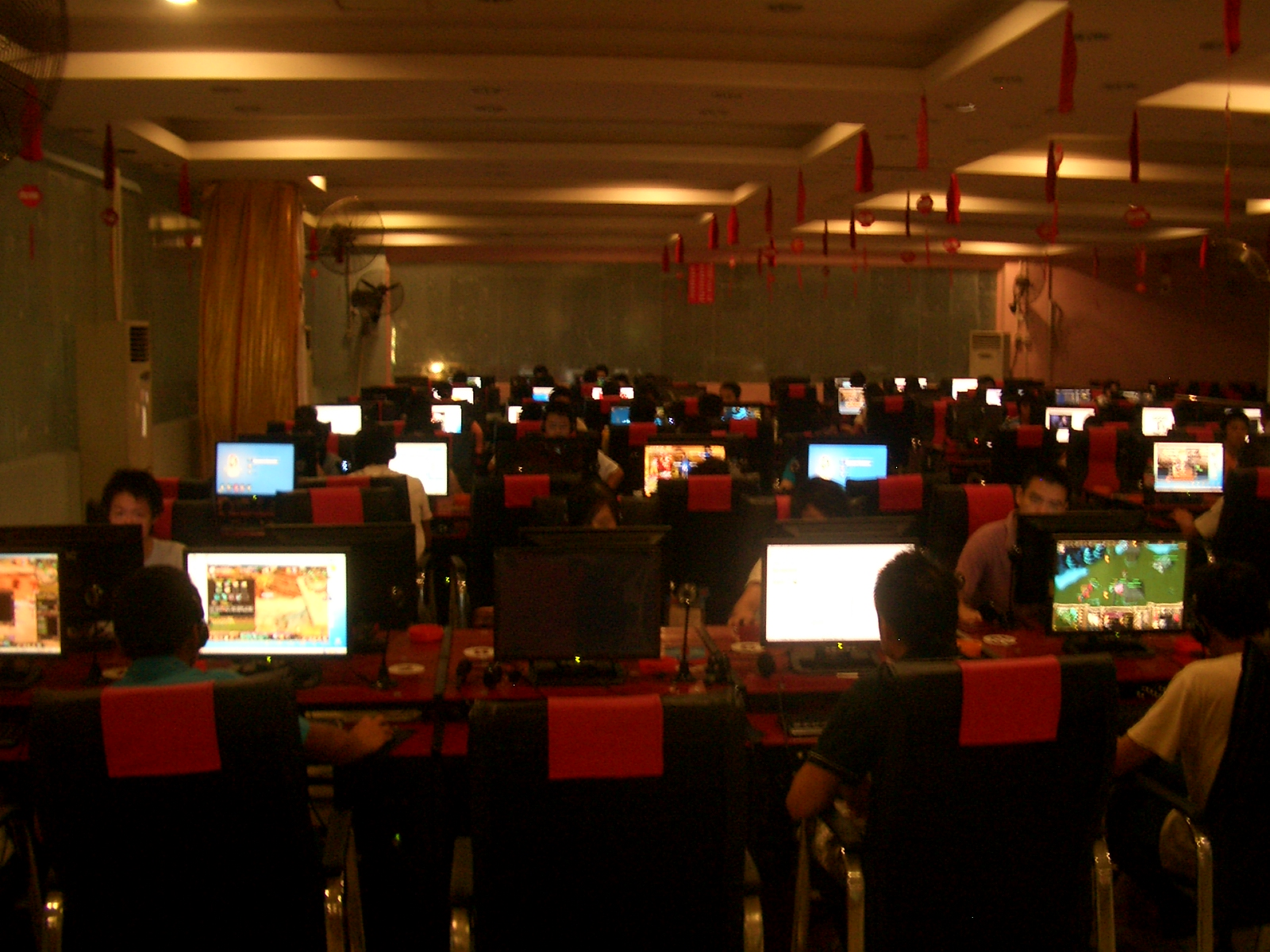
An internet café in Tongyang Town, the county seat of Tongshan County, Hubei

At the time that the video game industry was being established in North America in the 1970s, China was in the midst of major political and economic reform following the death of Mao Zedong in 1976. The country was technologically behind much of the rest of the world in terms of its media. Part of the reform was modernization of its media systems, helping to boost economic prosperity for citizens. As such, China saw little of arcade games or the first generation of home consoles, like the Atari 2600 and locally made Pong consoles.

By the 1980s, China's economy had significantly improved. After the video game crash of 1983 which devastated the North American video game market, Japan became a dominant factor in the global market leading off the third generation of consoles such as Nintendo's Famicom. The first widely-available video games in 1980s China were arcade games. The number of arcades in China increased significantly during fall 1985.

Consoles were introduced to China in the late 1980s and were primarily imported from Japan. However, importing these into China was costly, with a 130% tariff on hardware and games along with value-added taxes. Console systems were in high demand, but because of the high costs of importing, only few foreign companies did so. This created the video game clone grey market in China – manufacturing of reverse-engineered consoles and games at much lower costs than imported system, even if this required dubious or illegal copyright infringement. Outright copyright theft ("piracy") was also rampant in China due to the country's poor intellectual property controls. The sales of cloned console hardware and games outpaced that of legitimate imports, and further drove many foreign companies away since they could not compete with this area, such that by the 1990s, most video game systems in China were manufactured there. Xiaobawang Company created the first Chinese-produced console; later consoles came with a keyboard, or were the keyboard, and were intended both for gaming and educational purposes. By the end of 1993, over 60% of secondary school students in Beijing owned a gaming console. China also had a small market of legal consoles. Sega released the Master System in the late 1980s as the first officially distributed console in China ever, and in the 1990s it continued to distribute newer systems. The most popular was Mega Drive, which like Famicom was cloned by local manufacturers. Sega was one of the most famous arcade producers alongside Namco in the region. Nintendo entered in 1994 with the Game Boy and Super Nintendo through a Hong Kong distributor. There was also a market for smaller producers like UMC with Gamate and Super A'Can.

As home ownership of computers in urban China increased after 1995, the Chinese PC games market grew significantly.

Console games continued to grow in popularity through the 1990s, which created a broader concern in the media of video game addiction, with terms like "digital heroin" being used to describe video games. Even before the 1990s, there had been a broader stance in China that video games created negative effects on those that played them, which only grew during this decade. The impact on youth was particularly of concern, as video games were known to detract students from schoolwork, leaving them unprepared to enter China's college system. This situation was further increased by China's one-child policy, with children having less siblings, few others to interact with, and little to do outside of school. The anti-addiction facet also discouraged foreign companies from trying to break into the Chinese market.

=== Chinese console ban (2000–2015) ===
The concerns about video game addiction and negative influence on the youth came to a head in June 2000. The State Council passed a bill crafted by seven ministries specifically aimed at video games. The bill established certain provisions on video game content and regulations on operations of Internet cafés and arcades. The most significant facet of this bill was a ban on the production, import, and sale of consoles and arcade machines. However, the ban was poorly enforced, resulting in consoles being available on the gray market, often hacked. Importers, however, did not hide it from the government, and their stores could be found in large shopping malls. Despite this, the ban resulted in limiting of supplies and very high prices, far beyond the average citizen. The alternative was 8-bit and 16-bit clones manufactured in China in government-approved forms, such as educational computers, plug'n'plays, dvd players and handhelds. Global video game producers also attempted to enter the market with government approval, notably Sega Pico in 2002, Sony's PlayStation 2 in 2004 and several of Nintendo's consoles rebranded under the iQue partnership. However, with the restriction on game imports and their content, high price, huge piracy, outdated graphics, these consoles did not catch on in China. The ban did not include games available on personal computers (PC), and as a result, the PC video game market in China flourished over the next fifteen years. Internet cafés flourished, growing from 40,000 in 2000 to over 110,000 by 2002, and have remained numerous since.

The ban on arcade machines was dropped in 2009, but while arcade were permitted to operate, they had to take several safeguards to prevent excessive use by youth. However, since such arcades offered a low-cost way to play games without a PC, they still became a thriving industry comparable to PC gaming at internet cafés. As a result, Chinese gamers frequently visit the arcades to play action games, particularly fighting games, and occasionally unlicensed arcade ports of popular PC or mobile games such as Angry Birds or Plants vs. Zombies.

=== Online gaming (2004–2008) ===
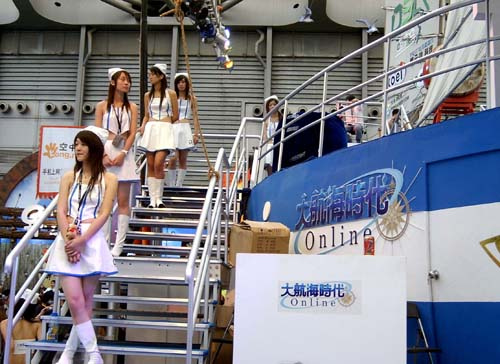
2006 ChinaJoy

Legitimate acquisition of games and the hardware to play them was still relatively expensive in China, which continued to fuel the video game clone market in China. A large number of PC gamers in China acquired software through illegal downloads and pirated software websites to avoid the cost. Developers of legitimate games in China recognized that, to compete with this black market, they had to develop games that had a free or low upfront cost model but offered a way to monetize their games over time. Many Chinese-developed games became online games offering numerous microtransactions to recoup costs; such games could be offered at Internet cafés, which became a popular option for Chinese players that could not afford computer hardware, even as the price of computing equipment dropped over the next decade. This created a boom of massively multiplayer online games (MMOs) in the Chinese market and which helped to establish market dominance of companies like Tencent, Perfect World, and NetEase. PC cafés proliferated in urban centers as China's population continued to grow. Western free-to-play and subscription-based games like Dota 2 and World of Warcraft, poised to take advantage of this model, also became successful. It also prompted Chinese developers to develop numerous clones of popular Western games that they would offer at low cost, an issue that still persists presently.

Online gaming became of serious concern to the government around 2007, re-raising the issues of gaming addiction that had prompted the 2000 console ban. A government report claimed that 6% of teenage internet users, amounting to 3.5 million young people, were playing online games more than 40 hours a week. In July 2007, the government required that online game publishers and operates incorporate anti-addiction software on their games, specifically by monitoring how long underaged persons played. If a minor played for more than three hours straight, the game was to wipe half of any in-game currency that had earned that session, and lose all credits if played for more than five hours. Additionally, these systems were required to have the player to log in using their national identification. However, at the time of implementation, not all publishers incorporated the required controls, and for those that did, players would find ways around the limitations, such as using family member IDs, or otherwise would simply play past the time requirements as there was nothing else to do beyond the video game.

=== Social and mobile gaming (2008–2014) ===
Number of players (top) and video game industry revenue in China (bottom) from 2008 to 2017, showcasing the expansive growth of the industry in this period

By 2007, the size of the Chinese video game market was estimated to be about US$1.7 billion with around 42 million players, having grown 60% from the previous year mostly driven by online gaming. At this stage, China's impact on the larger global market, valued at US$41.9 billion, was not considered significant, as much of it was still driven by the grey market for clones and pirated games. However, the rapid growth led to forecasts that China would be a major contributor to the global market within five-years time.

Online gaming readily led way to the rise of social network games in China around 2007–2008, given that players were accustomed to free-to-play nature of online gaming. The Chinese game Happy Farm (2008) was included in Wired's list of "The 15 Most Influential Games of the Decade" at #14, for its major influence on global social network games, particularly for having "inspired a dozen Facebook clones", the largest being Zynga's FarmVille. A number of other games have since used similar game mechanics, such as Sunshine Farm, Happy Farmer, Happy Fishpond, Happy Pig Farm, Farm Town, Country Story, Barn Buddy, Sunshine Ranch, and Happy Harvest, as well as parodies such as Jungle Extreme and Farm Villain.

This further prepared the China market for mobile games around 2012, where there are about one billion mobile phone subscriptions, according to a United Nations report, and after Apple secured deals to distribute their iPhones within China. Mobile devices in China are less expensive than computer or console hardware, and also provide Internet functionality; for many, they are the only form of Internet connectivity they have, making them popular gaming devices. Mobile games in China grew rapidly over the next several years, growing from about 10% of the Chinese video game market in 2012 to 41% in 2016. This expanded to more than 50% by 2018. Furthering the growth of the social and mobile game markets was the fact that the anti-addiction measures applied to online games did not apply to these types of titles; it was not until 2017 where renewed concerns about mobile titles like Honor of Kings led Tencent to implement a similar anti-addiction system for its portfolio.

Social and mobile gaming significantly grew the Chinese video game market beyond earlier estimates. By 2013, the Chinese market for video games saw nearly a ten-fold growth since 2007, valued at US$13.5 billion of the global US$83 billion, with over 490 million players, counting only those on personal computers; since consoles were still banned, these numbers do not take console players into account.

=== Lifting of the console ban (2014–2017) ===
In 2014, China partially eased the restrictions on video game hardware by allowing game consoles to be manufactured in the Shanghai Free-Trade Zone (FTZ) and sold in the rest of China subject to cultural inspections. In July 2015, the ban on video game consoles within the country was completely lifted. According to a statement from the country's Ministry of Culture, companies like Sony, Nintendo, and Microsoft – among others – were now allowed to manufacture and sell video game consoles anywhere in the country.

Microsoft and Sony quickly took advantage of the lifting of the ban, announcing sales of the Xbox One and PlayStation 4 platforms within the FTZ shortly after the 2014 announcement. Microsoft established a partnership with BesTV New Media Co, a subsidiary of the Shanghai Media Group, to sell Xbox One units in China, with units first shipping by September 2014. Sony worked with Shanghai Oriental Pearl Media in May 2014 to establish manufacturing in the FTZ, with the PlayStation 4 and PlayStation Vita shipping into China by March 2015. CEO of Sony Computer Entertainment Andrew House explained in September 2013 that the company intended to use the PlayStation Vita TV as a low-cost alternative for consumers in an attempt to penetrate the Chinese video game market. Both Microsoft and Sony have identified China as a key market for their next generation of consoles, the Xbox Series X and PlayStation 5 respectively.

Nintendo did not initially seek to bring the Wii U into China; Nintendo of America president Reggie Fils-Aimé stated that China was of interest to the company after the ban was lifted, but considered that there were similar difficulties with establishing sales there as they had recently had with Brazil. Later, Nintendo had teamed up with Tencent by April 2019 to help sell and distribute the Nintendo Switch as well as aid its games through the Chinese government approval process led by National Radio and Television Administration. The Nintendo Switch went on sale in China on December 10, 2019, though unlike the international version; this unit included several concessions to region-lock it to China. Even with the ban lifted, console sales were slow, as consoles require dedicated space in home and did not have additional functionality, like personal computers, and further slowed by continued popularity of Internet cafés. The hardware grey market also persisted, drawing away legitimate sales of consoles. Of the US$37.9 billion industry revenue in 2018, only about $1 billion was attributed to console sales. It is expected that as interest in legitimate sales of consoles increases in the future, the grey market will wane. Despite official availability of the Switch, imported and grey-market sales of Switch consoles still dominated China; while Nintendo and Tencent reported that a million Switch consoles had been sold by January 2021, the total number of Switch consoles in use within the country was estimated to be at least twice as high due to imported, non-region-locked versions.

=== Approvals freeze and further steps to restrict youth gaming (2018–2023) ===
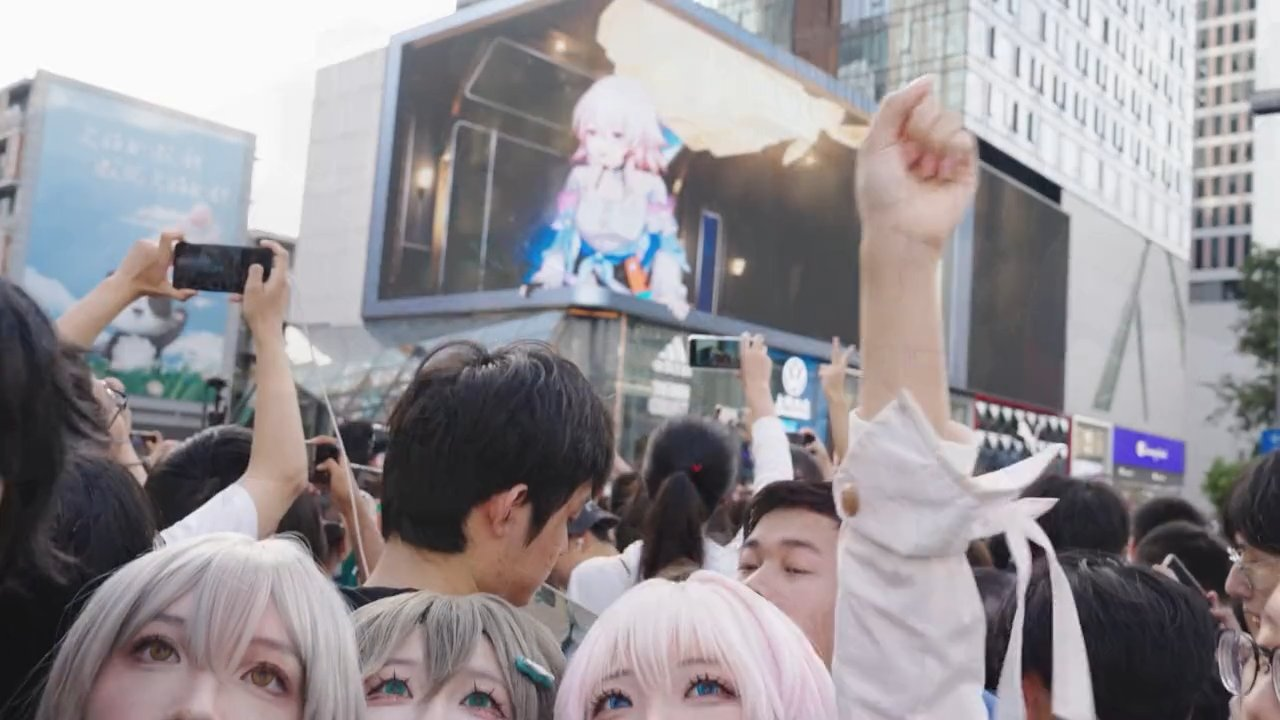
The LED advertising hoardings of Honkai: Star Rail in Chengdu, Sichuan

In March 2018, after the structural re-organization of State Administration of Radio and Television (SART), over a period of several months, no new game licenses were given out. Further, MOC had made the process of getting these licenses more stringent. This period has significantly impacted Tencent, one of the largest publishers of video games for China. In August 2018, Tencent was forced to pull from sale their version of Monster Hunter World from China as they had not got their license for it and the government received complaints about its content. Tencent were also blocked from publishing personal computer versions of PlayerUnknown's Battlegrounds and Fortnite Battle Royale. The license freezes was reported to have significant effects on those game publishers and developers that rely on Chinese sales. In late August 2018, the Chinese Ministry of Education called on the Chinese government and SART to also address the growing issue of myopia in children which was attributed to long hours of gaming on small screens like with mobile devices. The Ministry of Education had asked SART to consider placing restrictions on the number of hours each young player can play a game. On news of this, Tencent shares lost 5% of their value, an estimated US$20 billion on the stock market, the next day. A further approval route was closed by Chinese authorities in October 2018; this "green channel" route, which had been in place by August 2018, allowed a game to have a period of one month on the market for purposes of consumer testing without having full government approval, but had been seen by game publishers as temporary relief from the current ban. Tencent had been planning on distributing and monetizing from Fortnite Battle Royale via this method before this route was closed.

With China's effective ban of new games continuing into October 2018, Chinese players have found other routes of getting new games, which include using Steam which uses overseas servers. Further, existing titles released before the freeze that continue to offer new content have seen a resurgence in players and spending as a result. To comply with the planned new rules, Tencent announced that all mobile games it manages in China will require users to use their Chinese ID to play. This will be used by Tencent to track the time that minors play the game and implement time limitations on them, among other steps to meet new regulations.

By December 2018, the Chinese government had formed the Online Game Ethics Committee falling under the National Radio and Television Administration, which will review all games to be published in China for appropriate content as well as issues related to childhood myopia. The committee, by the end of the year, had restarted the approval process and will be working through a backlog of submissions to review in an expedited manner to allow new games to be released. Initial approvals to 80 back-logged titles was granted within days, but notably lacked games published by Tencent and Netease, the two largest publishers in China. After several more rounds, Tencent had two games approved near the end of January 2019, but did not include either Fortnite Battle Royale or PlayerUnknown's Battlegrounds, two major titles that were financial drivers in other countries.

A second freeze on approvals started in February 2019, as any further approvals on new games were suspending until the committee has been able to clear the backlog of the titles from the prior freeze. By this point, only about 350 games had been approved from the previous freeze.

According to China's State Administration of Press and Publication, the freezes were put in place as the video game industry had grown too rapidly in China at a rate that passed the capabilities for regulation to keep up. The second freeze that started in February 2019 was to put in place to give regulators a change to tune the game approval process to meet the current market size. The freeze is expected to be lifted in April 2019, alongside a new set of regulations for game approvals. These new changes include limiting the number of games that can be approved each year to around 5,000 games, strictly banning video game clones and games with obscene content, and placing more anti-addiction controls on mobile titles aimed at younger players.

The nearly year-long freeze has had rippling effects on the global video game industry. Whereas in 2017, around 9,600 new games were approved, only around 1,980 were approved within 2018. Tencent had been one of the top 10 companies in the world at the start of 2018, but by October, its stock had dropped in value by 40%, an estimated US$230 billion, and knocked the company out of the top ten. Apple attributed revenue loss in the fourth quarter of 2018 to China's approval freeze, which had also affected mobile video game apps. The freeze was expected to impact total revenues of the video game industry in 2019, with one analysis projecting a decline in revenue from the previous year, the first time in only a decade.

The Chinese government continued to push on restrictions on gaming after the approvals freeze was lifted, asserting its efforts were to restrict the influence of gaming on youth. The government has placed restrictions on the amount of time minors can play video games, first in 2019 to 90 minutes per day on weekdays and three hours on weekends, and then to only one hour per day on weekends by 2021. The government has required that all online games to implement strong authentication protocols developed by the government as to track players' time in a game as well. Additionally, the government banned minors under the age of 16 and require parental consent for ages 16-18 for hosting a livestream. Minors under the age of 16 are not allowed to watch livestreaming content from platforms like Huya Live and DouYu after 10pm.

Since March 2021, there had been new pressure on video games, kicked off by statements made by General Secretary of the Chinese Communist Party Xi Jinping during the annual Two Sessions meetings where he claimed that video games could have a bad influence on the minds of children who are psychologically immature. The government had stopped approval of games starting in August 2021 in an apparent new lockdown related to game content. The continued pressure by the government on the Chinese game sector started to take an effect on the economic valuation of the largest companies. An article published by the state-owned newspaper Economic Information Daily published a report in August 2021 that initially stated that online video games were an "opium for the mind", that gaming addiction was on the rise, and that there should be stronger government regulations. While the article was pulled and later republished without the "opium" statement, its effects caused shares of Tencent to drop by 10% initially that day in trading, though had recovered some after the revised article was published. Similar drops were seen with NetEase and Bilibili. Later in September 2021, when both Tencent and Netease were notified by the government of an upcoming hearing and reminding them than violations of their youth gaming restrictions would be seriously dealt with, both companies' stocks dropped by about 10% due to fears that the government may be clamping down more on gaming in the future, including another potential approvals freeze. Over 200 Chinese game companies, including Tencent and NetEase, signed a statement that month pledging that they will work to regulate youth gaming under the government's new regulations, as well as to enforce new rules relating to games involved "effeminate" portrayal of men in games. As reported by the South China Morning Post, an internal memo sent by the state's gaming trade organization to game companies in September 2021 for purposes of training further clarified that that government saw video games not as "pure entertainment" but as a form of art and thus works that must uphold "a correct set of values" related to China's heritage and culture, and would be more restrictive in what games they would approve within the country. The memo described games that have "blurred moral boundaries", where the player has an option of being good or bad within the game, and suggested that such games may need instead to restrict players to a specific moral path. Further, the memo identified that games that gave a "revisionist" form of history, or appeared more Japanese than Chinese, would likely fail to be approved.

According to the South China Morning Post, the approvals for new games persisted through the end of 2021, and due to the lack of approvals, more than 14,000 game-related companies were deregistered in China through 2021. The approvals freeze was lifted by April 2022 when new approvals were announced. In December 2021, players within China reported that the international version of Steam had been blocked in China. However, it turned out to be a partial disruption of Steam's web version and as of 2024, the International version of Steam is still fully accessible in China barring some occasional connection issues The government also banned the live streaming of unapproved games in April 2022.

A report issued in November 2022 by research firm CNG and the China Game Industry Group Committee, both with strong associations with the Chinese regulatory bodies, stated that the steps taken to reduce youth video game addiction had been working, with more than 70% of the country's youth gaming less than three hours a week. The report suggested that the regulatory bodies should be able to back off on the tight restrictions they had placed on publishers like Tencent and NetEase over the prior few years.

The NPPA issued new proposed rules in December 2023 aimed to further reduce the amount of time citizens play games and reduce in-game spending. These rules would prevent games from having daily or first-time login rewards and limit how much virtual currency that players could keep within in-game wallets. These rules appeared to be directly aimed at MMOs and gacha games, both popular titles within China, and as a result, both Tencent and NetEase saw major stock losses at the announcement of these rules totalling $80 billion. The government quickly walked back on these recommendations, and reported let go of the official that had drawn them by January 2024.

=== Global growth (2024–present) ===
As of 2024, China has begun approving more and more games as it seeks to revive the industry after a prolonged down period after a 2021 crackdown. The government has approved an average of 107 games per month in 2024. This came along with China's first AAA game Black Myth: Wukong. Some analysts expect Black Myth's success to have a positive impact on the Chinese gaming industry as the government could now be more inclined to issue game licenses to encourage domestic studios to work on more AAA games considering Black Myth: Wukong's domestic and international success

China only represented 0.8% of total Steam users in 2014 and reached 23.6% in March 2025, a figure placing the country above the United States in terms of users, indicating an increasing relevance of Chinese audiences as video game consumers on the global stage.

== Online gaming ==
Online gaming in China represents one of the largest and fastest growing Internet business sectors in the world. As of 2022, China is the second largest market for online games after the United States. In 2023, the country has 668 million internet users playing online games and the industry was worth US$42 billion. 53.8% of gamers are male, 46.2% are female.

Online games in China fall into two primary categories: MMORPGs and MOCGs. The former have a predilection for persistent online worlds where hundreds to thousands of game players can interact simultaneously; the latter is a generic term for games played competitively online without the existence of a persistent online realm (games as simple as online Ma Jiang and online competitive card games would fall under this category). In 2011, there were over 100 million Chinese MMO gamers.

Official Chinese statistics regarding online gaming state that as of the close of 2006 revenue from China's online gaming industry reached RMB 8 billion or around US$1.04 billion, with earnings reaching around RMB 33 billion or US$4.3 billion. Additionally, while Japanese, American, and South Korean companies have traditionally dominated the market, Chinese developed software now holds a 65% market share on the mainland, with an additional 20 million in revenue generated by users outside of China.

=== Games ===
QQ Games is one such popular online client. Growth was driven in part by China's most popular online game, Netease's Fantasy Westward Journey, which now has 1.66 million peak concurrent users. Another contributor is Giant's Zhengtu Online, which has 1.52 million peak concurrent users.

== Industry ==
=== Publishers ===
Today, the video game market is dominated by the Tencent Games division of Tencent Holdings, which is estimated to contribute to 46% of the overall revenue in China, and nearly 10% of the global video game market as of 2017, making it the largest video game company in the world. NetEase, which contributes to around 15% of overall revenue in China, is the second largest video game company in China, as well as the seventh largest in the world as of 2017. Other major players include Perfect World, Shunrong, and Shanda.

These companies are noted for having made aggressive investments in foreign video game developers, particularly from South Korea and the United States, and for making strategic agreements with other entities to serve as the China-based operating arm for foreign interests to meet Chinese government regulations. Notably, Tencent's acquisitions have included: US$400 million to acquire Riot Games in 2011 to gain right to the online game League of Legends and US$8.6 billion for Supercell in 2016 for its mobile game Clash of Clans. Among major investments include approximately 5% of Activision in 2013, a 40% interest in Epic Games in 2013, and a 5% interest in Ubisoft in 2018.

The 10 largest online game companies by revenue in 2017 are:

1. Tencent: Tencent Games is the Interactive Entertainment Division (aka IED) of Tencent.
2. NetEase: a popular online portal in China, also branched out in the space of MMORPGs with the release of Westward Journey. The game, based on ancient westward travels on the Silk Road (a popular theme from Chinese developed MMORPGs), has gone through two iterations; it was re-released as Westward Journey II due to numerous problems with the initial release, and its game engine was used to develop Fantasy Westward Journey, which is currently the most popular MMORPG in China (based on PCU numbers).
3. YY
4. 37 Interactive
5. Perfect World
6. Elex
7. IGG
8. Alpha Group
9. Century Huatong Group (owner of Shanda). Shanda produces and supports many popular MMORPGs. The company is significant because it introduced a new online payment system with the release of Legend of Mir 2 in 2001. Instead of charging users for the initial purchase of the game, Shanda gave the software away free-of-charge and decided to charge users for time spent playing in game. This payment system specifically counteracted piracy because the company could maintain easier control over the time users spent in the game, rather than attempt to limit the game's distribution. Shanda maintains a large number of MMORPGs in China developed by Western, Korean and native Chinese companies; the latter two regions produce Shanda's most popular games. The company also maintains numerous casual games as well, with platforms supporting chess and other non-persistent world games.
10. Kunlun Tech

The9 (第九城市) is similar to Shanda Entertainment, it specifically maintains and produces MMORPG content for the Chinese gamer base. The9 is notable because of its partnership with Blizzard Entertainment in bringing World of Warcraft (the most popular MMORPG outside of Asia) to China. World of Warcraft is the most popular western MMORPG in Asia, and one of the most popular in China in general. Recent statistics place its peak concurrent users at around 688,000, easily among the top MMORPGs in the country. The9 also implemented a pay-for-time system for the game, which differs from the monthly subscription payment structure used by Blizzard in other territories. In April 2009, World of Warcraft owner Activision Blizzard announced it had selected The9 competitor NetEase to operate the game in China. The9's license expired on June 7, 2009.

In 2023, China's gaming industry continued to show strong competitiveness and resilience in the global market. Compared to 2017, the ranking and revenue structure in 2023 has changed significantly, with headline companies such as Tencent and NetEase still dominating, but emerging companies such as miHoYo, HYPERGRYPH and Game Science are rapidly emerging as industry highlights with high-quality titles such as Genshin Impact, Arknights, and Black Myth: Wukong. In addition, game genres have become more diversified, from MOBAs and shooters to tactical role-playing and female-oriented card games, further segmenting market demand. These changes reflect the progress made by China's game industry in terms of technological innovation, content creation and global market adaptation, and also reveal the industry's development trends and opportunities in the new market environment.

Company	Game	Type	Income 2023
Tencent	Honor of Kings	Multiplayer online battle arena (MOBA)	$5,123 million
Tencent	PUBG Mobile	Player versus player shooter game	$2,331 million
Netease	Onmyoji	Role-playing game	$175 million
Netease	Identity V	Asymmetrical multiplayer survival horror game	$104 million
Lingxi Game	Ashes of the Kingdom	Female oriented card game	not clear
miHoYo	Genshin Impact	Action role-playing video game	$1,211 million
miHoYo	Honkai: Star Rail	Role-playing gacha video game	$748 million
HYPERGRYPH	Arknights	Tactical RPG & tower defense mobile game	$193 million
Game Science	Black Myth: Wukong	Action role-playing game	more than $961 million

==== Popularity statistics ====
In order to gauge the popularity of online games, both in China and internationally, three benchmarks are commonly implemented. The first is peak concurrent users (PCU), which is the maximum numbers of players online simultaneously at a given time. A high PCU number signifies that a game has a large base of constant user participation, which is essential for the survival of an online world. The second statistic used is the daily active player base; this number is essentially a count of the number of disparate users who sign on in a given 24-hour period. This statistic differs from PCU simply because of its longer time span but the daily user base is still a good quantifier of popularity and usage.

The third statistic is simply the total number of registered users for a specific game or service, this statistic is significantly more problematic because most, if not all, online games do not limit the user to a single account or user name. For example, some games claim millions of registered users; a disingenuous statistic given that the most popular MMORPGs in China usually garner only 800,000 to one million peak concurrent users.

==== Investment ====
In 2010, there were 25 investments made into Chinese online gaming companies. Of the 25 investments 20 of these deal disclosed financial details. As a group these 20 deals combined for a total of US$137 million in investment.

=== Developers ===
China has domestically produced a number of games, including Arena of Valor, Westward Journey, The Incorruptible Warrior, and Crazy Mouse. There are a large number of domestically made massively multiplayer online role-playing game MMORPGs in China, although many generally remain unheard of outside of the country.

China does have a small but growing indie game scene. The growth of China's indie game scene is considered to have been through hobbyist programmers starting around the 1990s and into the 2000s after the console ban where personal computer games became more popular. An early well-known indie developer, Coconut Island, was founded in the mid-2000s, and through its success, starting a number of game jams around the country starting in 2011, and eventually established the China Indie Game Alliance, one of the country's largest developer communities. Further interest in indie game development came with the popularity of mobile games in the country. The 2014 title Monument Valley developed by Ustwo in the United Kingdom is considered to have been an influential title as it was able to tell an emotional story through the game medium, and drew more interest in the indie game scene. Indie game development is challenged by the governmental approval process, requiring resources that many indie developers do not have. As with mainstream commercial games, indie games must be approved and get a license to be sold, or otherwise may be offered freely, which does not require a license. This has led to a black market around obtaining licenses, using non-China-controlled platforms like Steam to distribute games, or other questionable means to get their game into players' hands. As Valve has been working with Perfect World to create a China-specific client for Steam, which would be limited to games approached by the Chinese government, several indie developers fear this may harm the indie scene within China.

=== Manufacturers ===
Most of the major video game systems in the world since the 1990s have been manufactured in China; by 2019, 96% of all video game consoles were manufactured in China, generally taking advantage of the net lower-income labor available in the country. Some of the larger manufacturers based in China or with factories within China creating video game consoles include Foxconn, Hosiden, and Flex. Because of this, trade relations between China and other countries can have an impact on video game console pricing. Around 2019, as Sony, Microsoft, and Nintendo were preparing their next generation systems, a trade war between the United States and China was threatening to create a 25% import tariff on electronic goods shipped into the U.S. from China, which would have significantly affected the prices of these new consoles. There had already been an impact on personal computer components prior, leading to speculation on the impact on consoles. Sony, Microsoft and Nintendo jointly petitioned the U.S. government to not go through with this plan, in addition to other electronics vendors in the U.S. By January 2020, the U.S. government affirmed it had backed off this planned tariff. Despite this, Sony, Microsoft and Nintendo have all expressed plans to divest some of the Chinese manufacturing to other countries in southeast Asia such as Vietnam.

== Esports ==
Esports in China had been significant since 1996, as the country gained access to the Internet and PC gaming cafes began appearing across the county, also added by the popularity of QQ, a Chinese instant messaging client that helped with long-distance communications. Players quickly flocked to existing Western games that supported competitive Internet play such as Command & Conquer: Red Alert and Quake II. However, it was the release of StarCraft in 1998 that established the formation of organized competitive esports in China, including the formation of the China StarCraft Association to arrange unofficial tournaments for 1999 and onward. That same year was also the first official esports tournament in China based on Quake II. By 2000, the China E-Sports Association, formed from StarCraft players, was established, and Chinese players and teams participated and won medals starting with the World Cyber Games 2001. By 2003, the Chinese government recognized the success that Chinese players had in these games, and despite the stigma that the government had towards the addicting qualities of video games, recognized esports as an official sport in 2003, encouraging youth to excel in this area and that participating in esports was "training the body for China".

China continued to expand its esports engagement alongside South Korea over the next several years, with its growth occurring alongside the growth of other online games in China. China became more involved with planning of the World Cyber Games along South Korea, who had founded the event in 2000. The growth was further fueled by China's large Internet companies investing in esports teams and players, establishing esport tournaments of their own, and acquiring Korea developers of popular esports games. These companies have also gained investment into foreign companies that have produced popular esports titles in China. Notably, Tencent initially acquired an investment into Riot Games in 2008, which produced League of Legends, and by 2015 had fully acquired the studio. Tencent has also invested into Activision Blizzard, which, through Blizzard Entertainment, distribute StarCraft, World of Warcraft, Hearthstone, and Heroes of the Storm. The Alibaba Group and other e-commerce Chinese businesses have also invested heavily into the esports arena within China as early as 2006, but have made more inroads by establishing the World Electronic Sports Games in 2016 as a replacement for the World Cyber Games. Alibaba's efforts have centered on making the cities of Hangzhou and Changzhou esports centers in China.

Due to both government encouragement and industry investment, the number of professional esports players in China grew from 50 in 2006 to over 1000 in 2016. In early 2019, China's Ministry of Human Resources and Social Security included both "professional gamer" and "professional gaming operator" as an officially recognized job on its Occupation Skill Testing Authority list; by July 2019, around 100,000 people had registers themselves as "professional gamers" under this, and were making an average of three times the average salary in China. The Ministry had stated they believe that the professional esports sector in China can have over 2 million jobs in five years. This expansive growth has led several local governments to offer incentives for bringing esports to their cities.

In esports, China has been the world leader in terms of tournament winnings, possessing some of the best talents in the world across multiple video games, as well as one of the largest pool of video gamers. As of 2017, half of the top 20 highest earning esports players in the world are Chinese.

In addition to talent, China is also one of the largest consumers of esports. The 2017 League of Legends World Championship, held in Beijing, drew an estimated 106 million viewers from online streaming services with 98% of them from China, a number on par with the television audience of the Super Bowl. The event was seen as China establishing its place in the global esports marketplace, and demonstrated how China and South Korea's leadership in this area has helped to expand esports popularity to other countries. China is estimated to have about 20% of the global revenue in esports, including sponsorships, merchandising and media rights, with an estimated US$210 million of the global US$1.1 billion by 2019, having surpassed Europe and trailing only behind North America.

Despite the popularity of esports in the country, it is still not exempt from the grasp of the government's censorship. This was most notable in the Blitzchung controversy in October 2019 where an American video game developer Blizzard Entertainment punished Ng Wai Chung (吳偉聰) (known as Blitzchung), a Hong Kongese esports player of the online video game Hearthstone, for voicing his support of the 2019–20 Hong Kong protests during an official streaming event. Despite the public's response, which included a boycott and a letter from United States Congress representatives, Blizzard did not remove the punishment but did slightly reduce it.

== Intellectual property protection ==
As described above, China has had a history of a gray market of illegal imports and video game clones, both in hardware and software, as well as copyright theft/piracy as a result of poor intellectual property laws and enforcement in the latter part of the 20th century.

Chinese developers have been known to copy video games from foreign developers which resulted in multiple clones of established video game franchises. Some developers take inspiration from existing games and incorporate the designs, gameplay and mechanics to their own IPs. There have been multiple lawsuits filed by major video game companies such as the case filed by Riot Games against Moonton Technology for copying its characters featured in League of Legends. Riot itself has failed to have U.S. courts rule in their favor due to the copyright-taking happening outside of the United States, but through its partner Tencent, they have been successful in lawsuits filed in China. There have been reports where plagiarists are credited as the original creators. Analysts have attributed the rise in plagiarism to lack of knowledge of the original IPs due to non-releases of games in the Chinese Markets, delays or outright ban by the Chinese government.

In 2015, Blizzard Entertainment and NetEase affiliate Shanghai EaseNet obtained an interim injunction from the Guangzhou Intellectual Property Court against a World of Warcraft-themed mobile game developed by Chengdu Qiyou and operated by Beijing Fenbo Times (Rekoo), reflecting the increasing use of interim relief in Chinese video game IP disputes.

More recently, with the tech industry boom in China, the government has implemented stricter copyright controls and processes, but it is still considered to be weaker than intellectual copyright protections in Western nations, which poses a threat for foreign companies seeking to sell into China.

Because of the high amount of software piracy in China, many foreign game companies have been reluctant to enter the country's market with single player or console games. Instead, they have focused on selling online titles such as massively multiplayer online games as income from these titles comes largely from subscription fees or in game item purchases rather than the purchase price of the title itself.

== Farming ==
As of December 2005, there were an estimated 100,000 Chinese employed as "farmers", video game players who work to acquire virtual currency or items in online games so they can be sold to other players for real currency.

== Government oversight ==
=== Responsible agencies ===
Video games are regulated through the government and the Chinese Communist Party as with most mass media in China, but further, as video games are seen as a cultural benefit, additional agencies are involved in promoting the growth of video games.

==== Ministry of Industry and Information Technology ====
The Ministry of Industry and Information Technology (MIIT) was formed in 2008, superseding the Ministry of Information Industry, which was established in the late 1990s through the integration of the Ministry of Post and Telecommunications and the Ministry of Electronics Industry. The agency's primary goals include the regulation and promotion of Chinese telecommunications and software companies which include online gaming. MII is also responsible for a number of initiatives aimed at increasing the number and prominence of natively produced online games. One example of such involvement is the inclusion of online gaming in the 2006–2010 plan for software and information service development.

Listed here are the ministry's stated objectives involving online gaming:

- Study and formulate the state's information industry development strategies, general and specific policies, and overall plans, revitalize the electronics and information products manufacturing, telecommunications and software industries, promote the information economy and society.
- Draw up laws, rules and regulations on electronics and information products manufacturing, telecommunications and software industries, and publish administrative rules and regulations; and supervise the enforcement of laws and administrative rules.
- Work out technical policies, systems and criteria of the electronics and information products manufacturing, telecommunications and software industries, and technical systems and criteria of the radio and television transmission networks; certificate the entry of telecom networking equipment to networks and manage the entry of telecom terminal equipment to networks; direct the supervision and management of electronics and information products quality.
- Propel the research and development of electronics and information products manufacturing, telecommunications and software industries, organize research of major scientific and technological development projects, and digestion, absorption and creation of imported technologies, and promote the industrialization of scientific and technological research results; support the development of native industry.

The ministry is also responsible for a number of initiatives aimed at increasing the number and prominence of natively produced online games. One example of such involvement is the inclusion of online gaming in the 2006–2010 plan for software and information service development.

==== National Radio and Television Administration ====
The General Administration of Press and Publication (GAPP) was responsible for monitoring and regulating publication of print based media, electronic media, and audio-visual products (including online games). GAPP has also been instrumental in combating the growing problem of Internet addiction and game addiction in China by teaming up with eight other government outlets concerned with the growing effect of game play on China's youth. Towards this end, GAPP worked with other agencies, including the Central Civilization Office, Ministry of Education, Chinese Communist Youth League, Ministry of Information Industry, Ministry of Public Security, All China Women's Federation, and China's Care for the Next Generation Work Commission. GAPP also initiated the China National Online Game Publication Project in 2004. The intent of the project was to promote native game development through the use of government subsidies to game developers. The project had provided an estimated 300 million RMB to 16 Chinese game development companies by the end of its third year. The State Administration of Radio, Film, and Television (SARFT) affected the world of Chinese online games in 2004 by instating a blanket ban on computer game related commercials in the state-run media. The only company to directly contradict this ban is Chinese game provider The9, which teamed with Coca-Cola to jointly promote the release of the popular Western MMORPG World of Warcraft in 2005. Besides this instance, the online game market has thrived without much media promotion. The SARFT and GAPP were merged to form the State Administration of Press, Publication, Radio, Film, and Television in 2013, which was later transformed to the National Radio and Television Administration in 2018.

=== Crime ===
The Beijing Reformatory for Juvenile Delinquents claimed in 2007 that a third of its detainees were influenced by violent online games or erotic websites when committing crimes such as robbery and rape. In a high-profile case from October 2004, 41-year-old Qiu Chengwei was sentenced to death for murdering 26-year-old Zhu Caoyuan over a dispute regarding the sale of a virtual weapon the two had jointly won in the game Legend of Mir 3. Also, in September 2007, a Chinese man in Guangzhou died after playing Internet video games for three consecutive days in an Internet cafe.

=== Content control and censorship ===
As with almost all mass media in the country, video games in China are subject to the national policies of censorship. Content in video games is overseen by SART/NRTA; publishers are required to obtain a license for the game in China from SART before publishing, which may be denied if the game contains elements deemed inappropriate. The process to submit games for a license and put them on sale following that is overseen by MOC. The State General Administration of Press and Publication and anti-porn and illegal publication offices have also played a role in screening games.

Examples of banned games have included:

- Hearts of Iron (for "distorting history and damaging China's sovereignty and territorial integrity")
- I.G.I.-2: Covert Strike (for "intentionally blackening China and the Chinese army's image")
- Command & Conquer: Generals (for "smearing the image of China and the Chinese army")
- Battlefield 4 (for "smearing the image of China and endangering national security")

With the formation of the Online Game Ethics Committee in December 2018, nine titles reportedly were classified as prohibited or to be withdrawn, but this has yet to be confirmed by reliable sources. These included Fortnite, PlayerUnknown's Battlegrounds, H1Z1, Paladins, and Ring of Elysium. Eleven other titles were told that they needed to make corrective action to be sold within China, including Overwatch, World of Warcraft, Diablo 3, and League of Legends.

Publishing a title without having government approval can lead to a company being fined from five to ten times the revenues they earned from the game.

In addition to content control, the Chinese government has pushed technology companies, including video game distributors like Tencent, into allowing the government to have partial ownership of the companies that can be used to affect the content produced; in exchange, such companies may gain a competitive edge over others in interactions dealing with the government.

Along with guidelines to control and eliminate youth gaming issued in September 2021, the Chinese government has also issued a guidelines regarding the presentation of LGBT and "effimininacy" in video games are to be avoided.

=== Anti-addiction measures ===
China was one of the first countries to recognize the potential for addiction to the Internet, video games, and other digital media, and was the first country to formally classify Internet addiction a clinical disorder by recognizing Clinical Diagnostic Criteria for Internet Addiction in 2008. In 2015, the Chinese government also found that more than 500 million citizens over five years old, nearly half the population, suffered from some form of near-sightednessed, and while video games were not solely responsible for this, the government felt they needed to reduce the amount of time youth played video games.

China has sought to deal with addiction to video games by its youth by enacting regulations to be implemented by video game publishers aimed to limit consecutive play time particularly for children. As early as 2005 China's Ministry of Culture has enacted several public health efforts to address gaming and internet related disorders. One of the first systems required by the government was launched in 2005 to regulate adolescents' Internet use, including limiting daily gaming time to 3 hours and requiring users' identification in online video games. In 2007, an "Online Game Anti-Addiction System" was implemented for minors, restricting their use to 3 hours or less per day. The ministry also proposed a "Comprehensive Prevention Program Plan for Minors' Online Gaming Addiction" in 2013, to promulgate research, particularly on diagnostic methods and interventions. China's Ministry of Education in 2018 announced that new regulations would be introduced to further limit the amount of time spent by minors in online games. While these regulations were not immediately binding, most large Chinese publishers took steps to implement the required features. For example, Tencent restricted the amount of time that children could spend playing one of its online games, to one hour per day for children 12 and under, and two hours per day for children aged 13-18. This is facilitated by tracking players via their state-issued identification numbers. This has put some pressure on Western companies that publish via partners in China on how to apply these new anti-addiction requirements into their games, as outside of China, tracking younger players frequently raises privacy concerns. Specialized versions of games, developed by the Chinese partner, have been made to meet these requirements without affecting the rest of the world; Riot Games let its China-based studio implement the requirements into League of Legends for specialized release in China.

A new law enacted in November 2019 limits children under 18 to less than 90 minutes of playing video games on weekdays and three hours on weekends, with no video game playing allowed between 10 p.m. to 8 a.m. These are set by requiring game publishers to enforce these limits based on user logins. Additionally, the law limits how much any player can spend on microtransactions, ranging from about $28 to $57 per month depending on the age of the player. In September 2020, the government implemented its own name-based authentication system to be made available to all companies to uphold these laws. Chinese regulators further reduced the amount of time minors are allowed to play online games in August 2021 to one hour each day on Friday, Saturday, and Sunday, as well as on public holidays, from 8 to 9 pm. The measures also capped how much minors could spend on such games, with those between 8 and 16 limited to 200 yuan per month, and those between 16 and 18 to 400 yuan per month. Implementation measures were not described as part of this regulation. In September 2021, GAPP launched a website that allowed for any Chinese citizen to report on games that appeared to be in violation of these anti-addiction measures, classified between those that failed to perform proper identity checks, those that failed limit minors' hours, and those that failed to limit minors' spending within the game.

=== Data privacy ===
Most of the large publishers in China routinely collect data on players and how they play their game. One primary reason is that this is information that may be mandated by the government due to its mass surveillance programs and for implementing systems such as for the anti-addiction measures. Secondly, many of these large companies not only provide video games but a range of media across the spectrum including online video, music, and books, and these companies couple that data to have better reach of targeted advertising as to increase revenues. There are fears, but no reported cases, of these large companies sharing data with the government from foreign users. These fears have had impacts for companies that are fully or partially controlled by Chinese companies. For example, Epic Games in 2018 released its own digital storefront, the Epic Games Store which came under some criticism by players in the West, partially due to fear that Epic would share their data with Tencent and subsequently to the Chinese government, and have called the Store spyware.

=== Foreign ownership ===
With the rising success of online games from 2007 onwards, some foreign companies sought to invest full or partial ownership of Chinese companies to help capture a portion of the growing market. The Chinese government, concerned that these foreign companies would have influence on how the Chinese companies manage their video games, passed a law that banned any foreign company from investing or having any type of ownership in a Chinese company, with the General Administration of Press and Publication serving as the watchdog for such violations. This still allows for foreign companies to bring games into China, but only through operating agreements and partnerships with wholly owned Chinese companies. For example, Blizzard Entertainment's World of Warcraft, an extremely popular MMO in China, was run initially through The9 (Note: The9's contract with Blizzard was believed to be terminated between a combination of pressure from GAPP about Blizzard's partial ownership, as well as Electronic Arts' investment into The9 after Blizzard was acquired by Activision, a direct competitor to Electronic Arts.) and later by NetEase, both companies making necessary changes to parts of the game to adhere to Chinese content regulations.

=== Content ratings ===
China introduced a pilot version of its first content rating system in December 2020, the "Online Game Age-Appropriateness Warning" system. It uses three color-based classifications, green for "8+" (games appropriate for ages 8 and up), blue for "12+", and yellow for "16+". Games with online components are required to display these labels on packaging, their website, registration pages, and other relevant materials, The rating system was developed by the Audio-Video and Digital Publishing Association alongside Tencent and NetEase and 52 other organizations.

== Strategies for global expansion ==
Chinese gaming companies have emerged as dominant players in the global gaming industry, driven largely by their strategic focus on mobile gaming. This approach has enabled them to expand rapidly into international markets, leveraging the ubiquity of smartphones and improved mobile internet infrastructure. Among these companies, Tencent and NetEase have led the charge by prioritizing mobile-first game development, utilizing technological innovation, and tailoring content to local markets. Their global success is a direct result of adaptive strategies that have allowed them to capture significant market share across continents.

Mobile gaming has become the largest segment of the global video game industry, with China playing a pivotal role in shaping its evolution. As of 2024, China accounts for more than 31% of global mobile gaming revenue, generating approximately $40 billion annually. Tencent's Honor of Kings, one of the highest-grossing mobile games worldwide, is a prime example of this dominance. By the end of 2023, the game had surpassed 100 million daily active users globally, reinforcing its reputation as a flagship mobile title. Similarly, NetEase's LifeAfter gained immense popularity with its survival-themed gameplay, resonating with players worldwide.

A key factor in Chinese companies' mobile gaming success has been their global launch strategies, centered on meticulously tailored regional campaigns and localized game development. Tencent's expansion of Honor of Kings into regions such as Latin America, the Middle East, and Europe exemplifies this approach. By June 2024, the game had been launched in over 160 countries, supporting 14 languages to enhance the gaming experience for players worldwide. This global expansion contributed to Honor of Kings generating approximately $1.48 billion in revenue in 2023, maintaining its position as the highest-grossing mobile game of the year.

Similarly, NetEase's Knives Out has achieved remarkable success, particularly in Japan. By November 2022, the game had surpassed $2 billion in lifetime revenue, with 90% of this income originating from the Japanese market. This success is attributed to NetEase's collaborations with popular local brands such as One Piece and Evangelion, as well as aggressive advertising campaigns and exclusive perks tailored for Japanese players. In February 2018 alone, Knives Out generated $24 million globally, with Japan accounting for 80% of sales outside China.

Monetization models have been pivotal in driving revenue for Chinese mobile games, with developers adeptly implementing free-to-play (F2P) frameworks enhanced by in-app purchases (IAPs) such as cosmetic upgrades, weapon skins, and premium battle passes. This strategy has proven highly effective, as evidenced by Tencent's PUBG Mobile, developed in collaboration with Krafton. By June 2023, PUBG Mobile had surpassed $10 billion in global player spending, making it one of the highest-grossing mobile games worldwide. A significant portion of this revenue—approximately 60.3%—originated from China, followed by the United States at 10.7% and Japan at 3.7%.

The game's monetization success is largely attributed to its implementation of the Royale Pass, a tiered reward system that incentivizes player engagement and spending. Following the introduction of the Royale Pass, PUBG Mobile experienced a 365% increase in global spending during the first week compared to the preceding three weeks.

Chinese developers have also effectively employed hybrid monetization strategies, combining IAPs with in-app advertising (IAA) to maximize revenue. In China, approximately 60% of mobile game revenues are derived from in-app advertisements, indicating a balanced approach between player spending and ad-based income. This dual strategy allows developers to cater to both paying users and non-spenders, thereby broadening the monetization base. Furthermore, the integration of culturally relevant content and localized events has bolstered monetization efforts. By tailoring in-game offerings to align with regional preferences and cultural themes, developers have enhanced player engagement and willingness to spend on virtual goods. This culturally sensitive approach has been instrumental in the global success of Chinese mobile games, enabling them to resonate with diverse audiences and sustain high revenue levels.

Technological innovation has been a cornerstone of Chinese companies' mobile gaming expansion, with Tencent and NetEase leading the charge through advanced cloud gaming platforms and artificial intelligence (AI) integration. Tencent's cloud gaming service, START, launched in collaboration with NVIDIA, enables users to stream AAA games on underpowered devices, thereby avoiding the need for expensive hardware and expanding access to more gaming experiences. This partnership leverages NVIDIA's GPU technology to deliver a gaming experience comparable to playing on a local gaming rig.

Similarly, NetEase has integrated AI-powered features into its mobile games to enhance player engagement and retention. For instance, in the development of Cygnus Enterprises, NetEase's Team Miaozi utilized AI to create dynamic non-player characters (NPCs) that interact with players in a more lifelike manner, thereby enriching the gaming experience. Furthermore, NetEase announced plans to incorporate ChatGPT-like technology into its upcoming mobile game, Justice Online Mobile, allowing players to engage in complex, AI-generated dialogues with NPCs, which can influence in-game events and character relationships.

These technological advancements have not only enhanced gameplay but also contributed to significant financial growth. In the second quarter of 2024, NetEase reported revenues of $3.5 billion, a 6% increase from the previous year, with mobile games accounting for 76.4% of total revenue. By leveraging cloud gaming and AI technologies, Chinese gaming companies have been able to deliver personalized and immersive experiences, thereby fostering greater player loyalty and expanding their global footprint.

Emerging markets have proven particularly lucrative for Chinese mobile game developers, with regions like Southeast Asia, Africa, and Latin America experiencing explosive growth in mobile gaming due to increased smartphone penetration and more affordable internet access. In 2023, Southeast Asia's gaming market generated over $4.4 billion in revenues, with mobile gaming accounting for approximately 70% of this figure. Recognizing these trends, Tencent strategically launched Arena Breakout in these regions, targeting Latin American and Southeast Asian players with localized in-game events and culturally relevant content. This approach included translating the game into multiple languages, adjusting gameplay mechanics to suit local preferences, and collaborating with regional influencers for marketing campaigns. Such tailored strategies have significantly boosted Tencent's market share in these rapidly developing regions, aligning with the company's broader objective to expand its global gaming footprint.

Cross-platform integration has significantly bolstered the mobile gaming ecosystem cultivated by Chinese companies, particularly Tencent and NetEase. Tencent's implementation of cross-play functionality allows players to transition seamlessly between mobile, PC, and console platforms, thereby enhancing user retention and expanding the potential player base. This strategy aligns with Tencent's broader objective to create and support more cross-platform and AAA games capable of competing in the high-end market.

In the realm of esports, Tencent and NetEase have made investments to develop infrastructure linked to their mobile games. The PUBG Mobile Global Championship (PMGC) exemplifies this effort, with the 2023 tournament attracting a peak viewership of 980,110 concurrent viewers during the grand finals, marking it as the fifth-highest PUBG Mobile event in the history of the esport. This level of engagement underscores the growing prominence of mobile gaming within the global esports arena. By integrating cross-platform capabilities and investing in esports,

== Cultural impact ==
Video games have evolved from simple entertainment to significant cultural and diplomatic tools, embodying the concept of "soft power," a term introduced by Joseph Nye in the late 20th century. Soft power refers to the ability of a nation to influence others through cultural appeal and persuasion rather than coercion, contrasting with "hard power," which involves economic or military force. Video games, as a widely consumed form of storytelling and cultural representation, have become an effective medium for soft power, allowing countries to share narratives and cultural identities on both national and global scales. Recognizing their economic and cultural significance, governments have increasingly supported video game development as tools for public diplomacy.

In China, this approach aligns with efforts under Xi Jinping's leadership to communicate "China's stories" through various media, including video games, to foster national pride. This strategy enables China to present its values, narratives, and cultural landmarks globally. However, video games often undergo cultural scrutiny to ensure they align with national narratives. For example, "Marching Towards the Republic" (2003) was edited to match China's official historical perspective. Similarly, the National Radio and Television Administration (NRTA) has banned certain historical palace dramas for allegedly promoting royal lifestyles contrary to traditional virtues.

China aims to maintain cultural integrity while seeking global recognition for its heritage. Controversies arise over historical portrayals, such as criticisms from Chinese audiences regarding perceived inaccuracies in the Korean drama "Jumong." Additionally, reactions to games like "The Prefect's Decision III," viewed as glamorizing Japanese invaders, highlight tensions in historical representation. China's relationship with territories depicted in "Hearts of Iron" led to its ban, underscoring concerns about historical narratives in video games. Chinese players have expressed dissatisfaction with the scarcity of historically based strategy games reflecting their history.

"Black Myth: Wukong," an action role-playing game inspired by the classic Chinese novel "Journey to the West," exemplifies China's success in advancing video games. The game integrates traditional Chinese mythology with modern gaming mechanics, featuring Sun Wukong, the Monkey King, in a richly detailed world. It aims to entertain while educating players about Chinese culture through elements like Buddhist iconography and traditional architecture. This promotes non-Western narratives globally and challenges Western cultural dominance. Games like "Genshin Impact" and "Honor of Kings" demonstrate video games' potential as vessels of soft power by introducing global audiences to Chinese culture and history. Tencent's investments in series like "League of Legends" and "Arena of Valor" have established significant eSports communities worldwide. "Honor of Kings" has also gained international success, sparking interest in Chinese mythology. Research by Rong Chen, Yichen Guo, and Mengli Yu at Nankai University highlights the impact of Chinese cultural elements on player loyalty in video games.

== See also ==
- Gold farming in China
- Software industry in China
- China Software Industry Association
- Video gaming in Indonesia
- History of Eastern role-playing video games
- Digital divide in China
- Telecommunications industry in China
