= History of Eastern role-playing video games =

While the early history and distinctive traits of role-playing video games (RPGs) in East Asia have come from Japan, many video games have also arisen in China, developed in South Korea, and Taiwan.

== Japanese role-playing games ==
=== Japanese computer role-playing games ===
==== Origins (early 1980s) ====
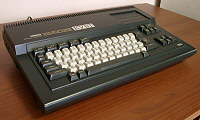
Yamaha YIS503II MSX personal computer

While the Japanese video game industry has long been viewed as console-centric, due to the worldwide success of Japanese consoles beginning with the NES, the country had in fact produced thousands of commercial computer games from the late 1970s up until the mid-1990s. The country's computer market was very fragmented at first; Lode Runner, for example, reportedly required 34 conversions to different hardware platforms. The market eventually became dominated by the NEC PC-8801 and PC-9801, though with some competition from the Sharp X1 and X68000; FM-7 and FM Towns; and MSX and MSX2. A key difference between Western and Japanese systems at the time was the latter's higher display resolutions (640 × 400) in order to accommodate Japanese text which in turn influenced game design. Japanese computers also employed Yamaha FM synthesis sound boards since the early 1980s, allowing video game music composers such as Yuzo Koshiro to produce highly regarded chiptune music for RPG companies such as Nihon Falcom. Due to hardware differences, only a small portion of Japanese computer games were released in North America, as ports to either consoles (like the NES or Genesis) or American computer platforms like MS-DOS. The Wizardry series (translated by ASCII Entertainment) became popular and influential in Japan. Early Japanese RPGs were also influenced by visual novel adventure games, which were developed by companies such as Enix, Square, Nihon Falcom and Koei before they moved onto developing RPGs. In the 1980s, Japanese developers produced a diverse array of creative, experimental computer RPGs, prior to mainstream titles such as Dragon Quest and Final Fantasy eventually cementing genre tropes by the 1990s.

Japan's earliest RPGs were released in 1982. The earliest was Koei's Underground Exploration, released in March 1982. It was followed by Pony Canyon's Spy Daisakusen, released in April 1982; based on the Mission: Impossible franchise, it replaced the traditional fantasy setting with a modern espionage setting. It was then followed by Koei's The Dragon and Princess (ドラゴン＆プリンセス) for the PC-8001 in 1982; it featured adventure game elements and revolved around rescuing a kidnapped princess. Following a random encounter, the game transitions from a text adventure interface to a separate, graphical, overhead battle screen, where a tactical turn-based combat system is used. Also in 1982, Koei released another early Japanese RPG, Danchizuma no Yuwaku (Seduction of the Condominium Wife), a PC-8001 title that also featured adventure game elements in addition to eroge adult content. These early experimental Japanese RPGs from 1982 are considered "proto-JRPGs" and predated the arrival of Wizardry and Ultima in Japan.

==== Mid-1980s ====
In June 1983, Koei released Sword & Sorcery (剣と魔法) for the PC-8001, and it also revolved around rescuing a princess in addition to killing a wizard. That same year, Koei released Secrets of Khufu (クフ王の秘密), a dungeon crawl RPG that revolved around a search for the treasure of Khufu. ASCII released its own RPG that year called Arfgaldt (アルフガルド), an FM-7 title also featuring adventure game elements.

Also in 1983, Nihon Falcom released Panorama Toh (Panorama Island) for the PC-88. It was developed by Yoshio Kiya, who would go on to create the Dragon Slayer and Brandish series of action RPGs. While its RPG elements were limited, lacking traditional statistical or leveling systems, the game featured real-time combat with a gun, bringing it close to the action RPG formula that Falcom would later be known for. The game's desert island overworld also featured a day-night cycle, non-player characters the player could attack or converse with, and the need to survive by finding and consuming rations to restore hit points lost with each normal action.

Screenshot of the original NEC PC-8801 version of Hydlide (1984), an early open world action role-playing game

The trend of combining role-playing elements with arcade-style action mechanics was popularized by The Tower of Druaga, an arcade game released by Namco in June 1984. While the RPG elements in Druaga were very subtle, its success in Japan inspired the near-simultaneous development of three early action role-playing games, combining Druaga's real-time hack-and-slash gameplay with stronger RPG mechanics, all released in late 1984: Dragon Slayer, Courageous Perseus, and Hydlide. A rivalry developed between the three games, with Dragon Slayer and Hydlide continuing their rivalry through subsequent sequels. Nihon Falcom's Dragon Slayer, released in 1984, is a historically significant title that helped lay the foundations for the Japanese role-playing game industry. It was a real-time hack & slash dungeon crawler that is considered the first action role-playing game. Dragon Slayer was a major success in Japan, and contributed to the emergence of a distinct action role-playing game subgenre on Japanese computers during the mid-1980s, with Nihon Falcom at the forefront of this new subgenre. Hydlide, an action RPG released for the PC-8801 in 1984 and the Famicom in 1986, was an early open world game, rewarding exploration in an open world environment. It also added several innovations to the action RPG subgenre, including the ability to switch between attack mode and defense mode, quick save and load options which can be done at any moment of the game through the use of passwords as the primary back-up, and the introduction of a health regeneration mechanic where health and magic slowly regenerate when standing still, a feature also used in Falcom's Ys series from 1987 onwards. The Tower of Druaga, Dragon Slayer and Hydlide were influential in Japan, where they laid the foundations for the action RPG genre, influencing titles such as Ys and The Legend of Zelda.

Also in 1984, The Black Onyx, developed by Bullet-Proof Software, led by Henk Rogers, was released on the PC-8801 in Japan. It became one of the best-selling computer games at the time and was voted Game of the Year by Login, the largest Japanese computer game magazine at the time. The game is thus credited for bringing wider attention to computer role-playing games in the country.

Dragon Slayer's success led to a 1985 sequel Dragon Slayer II: Xanadu, which became the best-selling PC game in Japan. It was a full-fledged RPG with character stats and a large quest, with action-based combat setting it apart from other RPGs, including both melee combat and projectile magic attacks, while incorporating a side-scrolling platform game view during exploration and an overhead view during battle. Xanadu also featured innovative gameplay mechanics such as individual experience for equipped items, and an early Karma morality system, where the player character's Karma meter will rise if he commits sin which in turn affects the temple's reaction to him. It is also considered a "proto-Metroidvania" game, due to being an "RPG turned on its side" that allowed players to run, jump, collect, and explore. The way the Dragon Slayer series reworked the entire game system of each installment was an influence on Final Fantasy, which would do the same for each of its installments. According to Games^{TM} and John Szczepaniak (of Retro Gamer and The Escapist), Enix's Dragon Quest was also influenced by Dragon Slayer and in turn defined many other RPGs. Falcom would soon become one of the three most important Japanese role-playing game developers in the 1980s, alongside Enix and Square, both of which were influenced by Falcom.

Hydlide II: Shine of Darkness in 1985 featured an early morality meter, where the player can be aligned with justice, normal, or evil, which is affected by whether the player kills evil monsters, good monsters, or humans, and in turn affects the reactions of the townsfolk towards the player. Magical Zoo's The Screamer, released for the PC-8801 in 1985, was an early example of a real-time shooter-based RPG. Set after World War III, the game also featured elements of post-apocalyptic science fiction as well as cyberpunk and bio-horror themes. Square also released their first RPG that same year, which was an early futuristic sci-fi RPG for the PC-8801, Genesis: Beyond The Revelation, featuring a post-apocalyptic setting. Other sci-fi RPGs released in 1985 include The Earth Fighter Rayieza by Enix, and Kogado Studio's MSX game Cosmic Soldier, which introduced an early dialogue conversation system, where the player can recruit allies by talking to them, choose whether to kill or spare an enemy, and engage enemies in conversation, similar to the later more famous Megami Tensei.

==== Golden Age (late 1980s–early 1990s) ====
The late 1980s to early 1990s is considered the golden age of Japanese computer gaming, which would flourish until its decline around the mid-1990s, as consoles eventually dominated the Japanese market. A notable Japanese computer RPG from around this time was WiBArm, the earliest known RPG to feature 3D polygonal graphics. It was a 1986 role-playing shooter released by Arsys Software for the PC-88 in Japan and ported to MS-DOS for Western release by Broderbund. In WiBArm, the player controls a transformable mecha robot, switching between a 2D side-scrolling view during outdoor exploration to a fully 3D polygonal third-person perspective inside buildings, while bosses are fought in an arena-style 2D shoot 'em up battle. The game featured a variety of weapons and equipment as well as an automap, and the player could upgrade equipment and earn experience to raise stats. Unlike first-person RPGs at the time that were restricted to 90-degree movements, WiBArm's use of 3D polygons allowed full 360-degree movement.

Another 1986 release was Falcom's Xanadu Scenario II, an early example of an expansion pack. The game was non-linear, allowing the eleven levels to be explored in any order. Dragon Slayer Jr: Romancia simplified the RPG mechanics of Xanadu, such as removing the character customization and simplifying the numerical statistics into icons, and emphasized faster-paced platform action, with a strict 30-minute time limit. The action took place entirely in a side-scrolling view rather than switching to a separate overhead combat screen like its predecessor. These changes made Romancia more like a side-scrolling action-adventure game. Square's 1986 release, Cruise Chaser Blassty, was a sci-fi RPG that had the player control a customizable mecha robot from a first-person view. That same year also saw the arcade release of the sequel to The Tower of Druaga, The Return of Ishtar, an early action RPG to feature two-player cooperative gameplay, dual-stick control in single player, a female protagonist, the first heroic couple in gaming, and the first password save system in an arcade game.

In 1987, Dragon Slayer IV: Drasle Family (Legacy of the Wizard) returned to the deeper action-RPG mechanics of Xanadu while maintaining the fully side-scrolling view of Romancia. It also featured an open world and nonlinear gameplay similar to "Metroidvania" platform-adventures, making Drasle Family an early example of a non-linear, open-world action RPG. Another "Metroidvania" style open-world action RPG released that year was System Sacom's Sharp X1 computer game Euphory, which was possibly the only Metroidvania-style multiplayer action RPG produced, allowing two-player cooperative gameplay. The fifth Dragon Slayer title, Sorcerian, was also released in 1987. It was a party-based action RPG, with the player controlling a party of four characters at the same time in a side-scrolling view. The game also featured character creation, highly customizable characters, class-based puzzles, and a new scenario system, allowing players to choose which of 15 scenarios, or quests, to play through in the order of their choice. It was also an episodic video game, with expansion disks released soon after offering more scenarios. Falcom also released the first installment of its popular, long-running Ys series in 1987. Besides Falcom's own Dragon Slayer series, Ys was also influenced by Hydlide, from which it borrowed certain mechanics such as health-regeneration when standing still, a mechanic that has since become common in video games today. Ys was also a precursor to RPGs that emphasize storytelling, and it is known for its 'bump attack' system, where the protagonist Adol automatically attacks when running into enemies off-center, making the game more accessible and the usually tedious level-grinding task more swift and enjoyable for audiences at the time. The game also had what is considered to be one of the best and most influential video game music soundtracks of all time, composed by Yuzo Koshiro and Mieko Ishikawa. In terms of the number of game releases, Ys is second only to Final Fantasy as the largest Eastern role-playing game franchise.

Hydlide 3: The Space Memories, released for the MSX in 1987 and for the Mega Drive as Super Hydlide in 1989, adopted the morality meter of its predecessor, expanded on its time option with the introduction of an in-game clock setting day-night cycles and a need to sleep and eat, and made other improvements such as cut scenes for the opening and ending, a combat system closer to The Legend of Zelda, the choice between four distinct character classes, a wider variety of equipment and spells, and a weight system affecting the player's movement depending on the overall weight of the equipment carried. That same year, Kogado Studio's sci-fi RPG Cosmic Soldier: Psychic War featured a unique "tug of war" style real-time combat system, where battles are a clash of energy between the party and the enemy, with the player needing to push the energy towards the enemy to strike them, while being able to use a shield to block or a suction ability to absorb the opponent's power. It also featured a unique non-linear conversation system, where the player can recruit allies by talking to them, choose whether to kill or spare an enemy, and engage enemies in conversation, similar to Megami Tensei. Also in 1987, the survival horror game Shiryou Sensen: War of the Dead, an MSX2 title developed by Fun Factory and published by Victor Music Industries, was the first true survival horror RPG. Designed by Katsuya Iwamoto, the game revolved around a female SWAT member Lila rescuing survivors in an isolated monster-infested town and bringing them to safety in a church. It was open-ended like Dragon Quest and had real-time side-view battles like Zelda II. Unlike other RPGs at the time, however, the game had a dark and creepy atmosphere expressed through the story, graphics, and music, while the gameplay used shooter-based combat and gave limited ammunition for each weapon, forcing the player to search for ammo and often run away from monsters in order to conserve ammo. That same year saw the release of Laplace no Ma, another hybrid of survival horror and RPG, though with more traditional RPG elements such as turn-based combat. It was mostly set in a mansion infested with undead creatures, and the player controlled a party of several characters with different professions, including a scientist who constructs tools and a journalist who takes pictures.

Star Cruiser (1988), an early role-playing shooter, combined first-person shooter and role-playing game elements along with 3D polygon graphics.

In 1988, Arsys Software's Star Cruiser was an innovative action RPG released for the PC-8801. It was notable for being an early example of an RPG with fully 3D polygonal graphics, combined with first-person shooter gameplay, which would occasionally switch to space flight simulator gameplay when exploring outer space with six degrees of freedom. All the backgrounds, objects and opponents in the game were rendered in 3D polygons, many years before they were widely adopted by the video game industry. The game also emphasized storytelling, with plot twists and extensive character dialogues, taking place in a futuristic science fiction setting. It won the 1988 Game of the Year awards from the Japanese computer game magazines POPCOM and Oh!X. Star Cruiser was later ported to the Mega Drive console in 1990. Another 1988 release, Last Armageddon, produced for the PC-8801 and later ported to the PC Engine CD and NES consoles in 1990, featured a unique post-apocalyptic storyline set in a desolate future where humanity has become extinct and the protagonists are demon monsters waging war against an alien species. The Scheme, released by Bothtec for the PC-8801 in 1988, was an action RPG with a similar side-scrolling open-world gameplay to Metroid. That same year, Ys II introduced the unique ability to transform into a monster, which allows the player to both scare human non-player characters for unique dialogues as well as interact with all the monsters. This is a recurring highlight in the series, offering the player insight into the enemies. Also that same year, War of the Dead Part 2 for the MSX2 and PC-88 abandoned certain RPG elements of its predecessor, such as random encounters, and instead adopted more action-adventure elements from Metal Gear while retaining the horror atmosphere of its predecessor.

Telenet Japan's Exile also debuted in 1988. It is a series of action-platform RPGs, beginning with XZR: Idols of Apostate. The series was controversial for its plot, which revolves around a time-traveling Crusades-era Syrian Islamic Assassin who assassinates various religious/historical figures as well as modern-day political leaders, with similarities to the present-day Assassin's Creed action game series. The gameplay of Exile included both overhead exploration and side-scrolling combat, featured a heart monitor to represent the player's Attack Power and Armour Class statistics, and another controversial aspect of the game involved taking drugs (instead of potions) that increase/decrease attributes but with side-effects such as affecting the heart-rate or causing death. An early attempt at incorporating a point-and-click interface in a real-time overhead action RPG was Silver Ghost, a 1988 NEC PC-8801 game by Kure Software Koubou. It was an action-strategy RPG where characters could be controlled using a cursor. It was cited by Camelot Software Planning's Hiroyuki Takahashi as inspiration for the Shining series of tactical RPGs. According to Takahashi, Silver Ghost was a simulation action type of game where the players had to direct, oversee and command multiple characters. Unlike later tactical RPGs, however, Silver Ghost was not turn-based, but instead used real-time strategy and action role-playing game elements. A similar game released by Kure Software Koubou that same year was First Queen, a unique hybrid between a real-time strategy, action RPG, and strategy RPG. Like an RPG, the player can explore the world, purchase items, and level up, and like a strategy video game, it focuses on recruiting soldiers and fighting against large armies rather than small parties. The game's "Gochyakyara" ("Multiple Characters") system let the player control one character at a time while the others are controlled by computer AI that follow the leader, and where battles are large-scale with characters sometimes filling an entire screen.

Dragon Slayer: The Legend of Heroes in 1989 departed from the action-oriented gameplay of previous Dragon Slayer titles, and instead used a more traditional turn-based combat system. In 1990, Data East's Gate of Doom was an arcade action RPG that combined beat 'em up fighting gameplay with fantasy role-playing and introduced an isometric perspective. That same year, Enix released a unique biological simulation action RPG by Almanic that revolved around the theme of evolution, 46 Okunen Monogatari, a revised version of which was released in 1992 as E.V.O.: Search for Eden. That same year, Alpha Denshi's Crossed Swords for the arcades combined the first-person beat 'em up gameplay of SNK's The Super Spy (released the same year) with RPG elements, while replacing the first-person shooting with hack & slash combat. Also in 1990, Hideo Kojima's SD Snatcher, while turn-based, abandoned random encounters and introduced an innovative first-person shooter-based battle system where firearm weapons (each with different abilities and target ranges) have limited ammunition and the player can aim at specific parts of the enemy's body with each part weakening the enemy in different ways; an auto-battle feature could also be enabled. Such a battle system has rarely been used since, though similar battle systems based on targeting individual body parts can later be found in Square's Vagrant Story (2000), Bethesda's Fallout 3 (2008), and Nippon Ichi's Last Rebellion (2010).

==== Decline and independent titles (late 1990s–2000s) ====
From the mid-1990s, the Japanese video game industry began declining. This was partly due to the death of the NEC PC-9801 computer format, as the Sega Saturn and Sony PlayStation became increasingly powerful in the console market while the computer market became increasingly dominated by the IBM Personal Computer and Microsoft Windows 95. This led to many Japanese PC manufacturers either continuing to develop for Windows 95 or moving over to the more lucrative console market. While most developers turned their attention to the console market, some developers dedicated to content unsuitable for consoles (such as eroge and complex military strategy games) continued their focus on the PC market.

In 1996, Night Slave was a shooter RPG released for the PC-98 that combined the side-scrolling shooter gameplay of Assault Suits Valken and Gradius, including an armaments system that employs recoil physics, with many RPG elements such as permanently levelling up the mecha and various weapons using power-orbs obtained from defeating enemies as well as storyline cut scenes. These cut scenes also occasionally contain lesbian adult content.

Lastly, in the late 1990s, a new Internet fad began, owing to simplistic software development kits such as the Japanese RPG Maker series (1988 onwards). Influenced by console RPGs and based mostly on the gameplay and style of the SNES and Sega Genesis games, a large group of young programmers and aficionados across the world began creating independent console-style computer RPGs and sharing them online. An early successful example was Corpse Party (1996), a survival horror indie game created using the RPG Maker engine. Much like the survival horror adventure games Clock Tower (1995 onwards) and later Haunting Ground (2005), the player characters in Corpse Party lack any means of defending themselves; the game also featured up to 20 possible endings. The game was not released in Western markets until 2011. In an interview with GameDaily in 2007, MTVN's Dave Williams remarked that "games like this [user generated] have been sort of under the radar for something that could be the basis of a business. We have the resources and we can afford to invest more... I think it's going to be a great thing for the consumer".

==== Steam and resurgence (2010s) ====
In the 2010s, Japanese RPGs have been experiencing a resurgence on PC, with a significant increase in the number of Japanese RPGs releasing for the Steam platform. This began with the 2010 release of doujin/indie game Recettear (2007) for Steam, selling over 500,000 units on the platform. This led to many Japanese doujin/indie games releasing on Steam in subsequent years. The early part of the decade also saw the debut of Nihon Falcom's Ys series on Steam as well as FromSoftware's Dark Souls, which sold millions on the platform. Other Japanese RPGs were subsequently ported to the platform, such as the previously niche Valkyria Chronicles and The Legend of Heroes: Trails in the Sky, as well as ports of several Final Fantasy games.

By 2015, Japan had become the world's fourth largest PC game market, behind only China, the United States, and South Korea. The Japanese game development engine RPG Maker has also gained popularity, with hundreds of games being created with it and released on Steam by the late 2010s.

=== Japanese console role-playing games ===
==== Origins (mid-1980s) ====
The earliest RPG on a console was Dragonstomper on the Atari 2600 in 1982. Bokosuka Wars, originally released for the Sharp X1 computer in 1983, was ported to the NES console in 1985, and was a commercial success in Japan, where it laid the foundations for the tactical role-playing game subgenre. Other notable early console RPGs included ports of Namco's 1984 arcade action role-playing games: The Tower of Druaga, which was ported to the NES in 1985, and Dragon Buster, the first video game to feature a life meter (called "Vitality" in-game), also ported to the NES in 1987.

Dragon Quest (1986), which combined the overhead exploration of Ultima with the first-person menu-driven combat of Wizardry, created a streamlined gameplay format that made console RPGs accessible to a wider audience.

In 1985, Yuji Horii and his team at Chunsoft began production on Dragon Quest (Dragon Warrior). After Enix published the game in early 1986, it became the template for future console RPGs. The game was influenced by the first-person random battles in Wizardry, the overhead movement in Ultima, and the mystery storytelling in Horii's own 1983 visual novel game The Portopia Serial Murder Case. Horii's intention behind Dragon Quest was to create a RPG that appealed to a wider audience unfamiliar with the genre or video games in general. This required the creation of a new kind of RPG, that did not rely on previous D&D experience, nor require hundreds of hours of rote fighting, and that could appeal to any kind of gamer. Compared to statistics-heavy computer RPGs, Dragon Quest was a more streamlined, faster-paced game based on exploration and combat, and featured a top-down view in dungeons, in contrast to the first-person view used for dungeons in earlier computer RPGs. The streamlined gameplay of Dragon Quest thus made the game more accessible to a wider audience than previous computer RPGs. The game also placed a greater emphasis on storytelling and emotional involvement, building on Horii's previous work The Portopia Serial Murder Case, but this time introducing a coming of age tale for Dragon Quest that audiences could relate to, making use of the RPG level-building gameplay as a way to represent this. It also featured elements still found in most console RPGs, like major quests interwoven with minor subquests, an incremental spell system, the damsel-in-distress storyline that many RPGs follow, and a romance element that remains a staple of the genre, alongside manga-style art by Akira Toriyama and a classical score by Koichi Sugiyama that was considered revolutionary for console video game music.

The gameplay of Dragon Quest itself was non-linear, with most of the game not blocked in any way other than by being infested with monsters that can easily kill an unprepared player. This was balanced by the use of bridges to signify a change in difficulty and a new level progression that departed from D&D, where in the 1st and 2nd editions, players are given random initial stats and a constant growth rate. Dragon Quest instead gave the player some extra hit points at the start and a level progression where the effective rate of character growth decelerates over time, similar to how the more recent editions of D&D have balanced the gameplay. Dragon Quest also gave players a clear objective from the start of the game and a series of smaller scenarios to build up the player's strength in order to achieve that objective. The ending could also be altered depending on the moral dialogue choice of whether or not the protagonist should join the antagonist on his evil conquest towards the end of the game. The game also had a limited inventory requiring item management, while the caves were dark, requiring the use of a torch to display a field of vision around the character. With Dragon Quest becoming widely popular in Japan, such that local municipalities were forced to place restrictions on where and when the game could be sold, the Dragon Quest series is still considered a bellwether for the Japanese video game market. Dragon Quest did not reach North America until 1989, when it was released as Dragon Warrior, the first NES RPG to be released in North America. The release of Dragon Quest was followed by NES remakes of the early Wizardry and Ultima titles over the next several years by Pony Canyon.

Other releases at the time were the action role-playing games Deadly Towers (1986) and Rygar (1987), which were notable as some of the first Japanese console RPGs to be released in North America, where they were well received for being a new kind of RPG that differed from both the console action-adventures (such as Castlevania, Trojan, and Wizards & Warriors) and American computer RPGs (such as Wizardry, Ultima, and Might & Magic) that American gamers were previously more familiar with at the time. Deadly Towers and Rygar were particularly notable for their permanent power-up mechanic, which at the time blurred the line between the power-ups used in action-adventures and the experience points used in RPGs.

==== Evolution (late 1980s) ====
In 1987, Digital Devil Story: Megami Tensei by Atlus for the Nintendo Famicom abandoned the common medieval fantasy setting and sword and sorcery theme in favour of a modern science-fiction setting and horror theme. It also introduced the monster-catching mechanic with its demon-summoning system, which allowed the player to recruit enemies into their party, through a conversation system that gives the player a choice of whether to kill or spare an enemy and allows them to engage any opponent in conversation. Sega's original Phantasy Star for the Master System established a number of genre conventions, and its setting combined sci-fi and fantasy in a way that set it apart from the D&D staple. It also featured pre-defined player characters with their own backstories, which would later become common in console RPGs. It was also one of the first games to feature a female protagonist and animated monster encounters, and allowed inter-planetary travel between three planets. Boys' Life magazine in 1988 predicted that Phantasy Star as well as the Zelda games may represent the future of home video games, combining the qualities of both arcade and computer games. Another 1987 title Miracle Warriors: Seal of the Dark Lord was a third-person RPG that featured a wide open world and a mini-map on the corner of the screen. The Dragon Slayer series also made its debut on the NES console (and thus to American audiences) in 1987, with the port of Legacy of the Wizard (Dragon Slayer IV), a non-linear action RPG featuring a Metroidvania-style open world, and the release of Faxanadu, a side-story to Xanadu. Wonder Boy in Monster Land combined the platform gameplay of the original Wonder Boy with many RPG elements, which would inspire later action RPGs such as Popful Mail (1991).

The Magic of Scheherazade, released in 1987, was notable for several innovations, including a unique setting based on the Arabian Nights, time travel between five different time periods, a unique combat system featuring both real-time solo action and turn-based team battles, and the introduction of team attacks where two party members could join forces to perform an extra-powerful attack. Castlevania II: Simon's Quest was an action RPG that combined the platform-action mechanics of the original Castlevania with the open world of an action-adventure and RPG mechanics such as experience points. It also introduced a day-night cycle that affects when certain NPCs appear in certain locations and offered three possible multiple endings depending on the time it took to complete the game. Square's Cleopatra no Mahō was an adventure RPG with a unique plot revolving around archeology. Square's original Final Fantasy for the NES had a character creation system that allowed the player to create their own parties and assign different character classes to party members, who in turn evolve through an early class change system later in the game. It also featured concepts such as time travel; side-view battles, with the player characters on the right and the enemies on the left, which soon became the norm for numerous console RPGs; and the use of transportation for travel, "by ship, canoe, and even flying airship". While creating Final Fantasy, Hironobu Sakaguchi took inspiration from certain elements in Hayao Miyazaki's anime films, such as the airships being inspired by Castle in the Sky. Some of these 1987 releases proved popular and went on to spawn their own RPG franchises, particularly the Megami Tensei, Phantasy Star and Final Fantasy series. In particular, the Final Fantasy and Dragon Quest series remain popular today, Final Fantasy more so in the West and Dragon Quest more so in Japan.

In 1988, Dragon Quest III introduced a character progression system allowing the player to change the party's character classes during the course of the game, and keep a character's stats and skills learned from previous classes. This class-changing system shaped the gameplay of future console RPGs, especially the Final Fantasy series, While the earlier Dragon Quest games were also non-linear, Dragon Quest III was the most substantial example of open-world gameplay among the early Dragon Quest games. It also allowed the player to swap characters in and out of the party at will, and another major innovation was the introduction of day/night cycles; certain items, characters, and quests are only accessible at certain times of day. Final Fantasy II is considered "the first true Final Fantasy game", introducing an "emotional story line, morally ambiguous characters, tragic events" and a story to be "emotionally experienced rather than concluded from gameplay and conversations". It also replaced traditional levels and experience points with an activity-based progression system, where "the more you use a skill, the better you are with it", a mechanic that later appeared in SaGa, Grandia, Final Fantasy XIV, and The Elder Scrolls. Final Fantasy II also featured open-ended exploration, and had a dialogue system where keywords or phrases can be memorized and mentioned during conversations with NPCs, the theme of an evil empire against a small band of rebels (similar to Star Wars), and the iconic chocobo, a fictional creature inspired by Hayao Miyazaki's Nausicaa of the Valley of the Wind. That same year, World Court Tennis for the TurboGrafx-16 introduced a new form of gameplay: a unique tennis-themed sports RPG mode.

Sega's Phantasy Star II (1989) was an important milestone in the genre, establishing conventions such as an epic, dramatic, character-driven storyline, and science fiction setting.

In 1989, Phantasy Star II for the Genesis established many conventions of the genre, including an epic, dramatic, character-driven storyline dealing with serious themes and subject matter, and a strategy-based battle system. Its purely science fiction setting was also a major departure for RPGs, which had previously been largely restricted to fantasy or science fantasy settings. The game's science fiction story was also unique, reversing the common alien invasion scenario by instead presenting Earthlings as the invading antagonists rather than the defending protagonists. The game's strong characterization, and use of self-discovery as a motivating factor for the characters and the player, was a major departure from previous RPGs and had a major influence on subsequent RPGs such as the Final Fantasy series. It also made a bold attempt at social commentary years before the Final Fantasy series started doing the same. Capcom's Sweet Home for the NES introduced a modern Japanese horror theme and laid the foundations for the survival horror genre, later serving as the main inspiration for Resident Evil (1996). Like Resident Evil, Sweet Home featured the use of scattered notes as a storytelling mechanic and a number of multiple endings depending on which characters survived to the end. Tengai Makyo: Ziria released for the PC Engine CD that same year was the first RPG released on CD-ROM and the first in the genre to feature animated cut scenes and voice acting. The game's plot was also unusual for its feudal Japan setting and its emphasis on humour; the plot and characters were inspired by the Japanese folk tale Jiraiya Goketsu Monogatari. The music for the game was also composed by noted musician Ryuichi Sakamoto. Also in 1989, the early enhanced remake Ys I & II was one of the first games to use CD-ROM, utilized to provide enhanced graphics, animated cut scenes, a Red Book CD soundtrack, and voice acting. The game offered a "much larger, more colorful world, populated with lifelike characters who communicated with voice instead of text", heralding "the evolution of the standard role-playing game" according to RPGFan. Its English localization was also one of the first to use voice dubbing. Ys I & II went on to receive the Game of the Year award from OMNI Magazine in 1990, as well as many other prizes.

In 1989, Dungeon Explorer was also released by Atlus for the TurboGrafx-16. The game is considered a pioneer title in the action RPG genre with its multiplayer cooperative gameplay, allowing up to five players to play simultaneously. That year also saw the release of Super Hydlide, the Mega Drive port of the 1987 MSX action RPG Hydlide 3: The Space Memories, which adopted the morality meter of its 1985 predecessor Hydlide II: Shine of Darkness where the player's alignment changes depending on whether the player kills humans, good monsters, or evil monsters, and expanded its predecessor's time option, which speeds up or slows down the gameplay, with the introduction of an in-game clock setting day-night cycles and a need to sleep and eat. It also made other improvements such as cut scenes for the opening and ending, a combat system closer to The Legend of Zelda, the choice between distinct character classes, and a weight system affecting the player's movement depending on the weight of carried equipment. The Final Fantasy Legend, the first in the SaGa series, adopted Final Fantasy II's activity-based progression, expanding it with weapons that shatter with repeated use, and added new ideas such as a race of monsters that mutate depending on which fallen foes they consume. The game also introduced the concept of memento mori, with a theme revolving around death, while the plot consisted of loosely connected stories and sidequests rather than an epic narrative. That same year, River City Ransom featured elements of both the beat 'em up and action RPG genres, combining brawler combat with many RPG elements, including an inventory, buying and selling items, learning new abilities and skills, needing to listen for clues, searching to find all the bosses, shopping in the malls, buying items to heal, and increasing stats. It was also an early sandbox brawler reminiscent of Grand Theft Auto.

==== Golden Age (1990s–mid-2000s) ====
The 'golden age' of console RPGs is often dated from the 1990s to the early 2000s. Console RPGs distinguished themselves from computer RPGs to a greater degree in the early 1990s. As console RPGs became more heavily story-based than their computer counterparts, one of the major differences that emerged during this time was in the portrayal of the characters, with most American computer RPGs at the time having characters devoid of personality or background as their purpose was to represent avatars which the player uses to interact with the world, in contrast to Japanese console RPGs which depicted pre-defined characters who had distinctive personalities, traits, and relationships, such as Final Fantasy and Lufia, with players assuming the roles of people who cared about each other, fell in love or even had families. Romance in particular was a theme that was common in most console RPGs but alien to most computer RPGs at the time. Japanese console RPGs were also generally more faster-paced and action-adventure-oriented than their American computer counterparts. The console RPG market became more profitable, which led to several American manufacturers releasing console ports of traditional computer RPGs such as Ultima, though they received mixed reviews due to console gamers at the time considering them to be not "as exciting as the Japanese imports".

During the 1990s, console RPGs had become increasingly dominant. Console RPGs had eclipsed computer RPGs for some time, though computer RPGs began making a comeback towards the end of the decade.

===== Early 1990s =====
In 1990, Dragon Quest IV segmented its plot into segregated chapters, making the game more linear than its predecessor while allowing for greater characterization. The game also introduced an AI system called "Tactics" which allowed the player to modify the strategies used by the allied party members while maintaining full control of the hero. This "Tactics" system is seen as a precursor to Final Fantasy XII's "Gambits" system. Final Fantasy III introduced the classic "job system", a character progression engine allowing the player to change the character classes, as well as acquire new and advanced classes and combine class abilities, during the course of the game. That same year also saw the release of Nintendo's Fire Emblem: Ankoku Ryu to Hikari no Tsurugi, a game that set the template for the tactical role-playing game genre and was the first entry in the Fire Emblem series. Another notable strategy RPG that year was Koei's Bandit Kings of Ancient China, which was successful in combining the strategy RPG and management simulation genres, building on its own Nobunaga's Ambition series that began in 1983. Several early RPGs set in a post-apocalyptic future were also released that year, including Digital Devil Story: Megami Tensei II, and Crystalis, which was inspired by Hayao Miyazaki's Nausicaa of the Valley of the Wind. Crystalis also made advances to the action role-playing game subgenre, being a true action RPG that combined the real-time action-adventure combat and open world of The Legend of Zelda with the level-building and spell-casting of traditional RPGs like Final Fantasy. That year also saw the release of Phantasy Star III: Generations of Doom, which featured an innovative and original branching storyline, which spans three generations of characters and can be altered depending on which character the protagonist of each generation marries, leading to four possible endings.

Final Fantasy IV (1991) helped popularize dramatic storytelling in RPGs (alongside the earlier Phantasy Star games) and introduced the hybrid "Active Time Battle" system.

In 1991, Final Fantasy Adventure, the first in the Mana series, featured the ability to kill townspeople. The most important RPG that year, however, was Final Fantasy IV, one of the first role-playing games to feature a complex, involving plot, placing a much greater emphasis on character development, personal relationships, and dramatic storytelling. It also introduced a new battle system: the "Active Time Battle" system, developed by Hiroyuki Ito, where the time-keeping system does not stop. In Final Fantasy IV, the ATB system would be hidden to the player. However, starting with Final Fantasy V, the meter would be visible to the player. On the battle screen, each character has an ATB meter that gradually fills, and the player is allowed to issue a command to that character once the meter is full. The fact that enemies can attack or be attacked at any time is credited with injecting urgency and excitement into the combat system. The ATB combat system was considered revolutionary for being a hybrid between turn-based and real-time combat, with its requirement of faster reactions from players appealing to those who were more used to action games. That same year, Crea-Tech's Metal Max was an early non-linear, open-ended, post-apocalyptic, vehicle combat RPG that lacked a predetermined story path and instead allowed the player to choose which missions to follow in whatever order while being able to visit any place in the game world. The ending also can be determined by the player's actions, while they can continue playing the game even after the ending. The game also allowed the player to choose the character classes for each player character as well as create and modify the tanks used in battle. The Metal Max series continued to allow tank customization and open-ended gameplay, while also allowing the player to obtain an ending at almost any time, particularly Metal Saga, which could be completed with an ending scenario just minutes into the game, making it the shortest possible RPG. Telenet Japan released a console remake of its 1988 action-platform RPG Exile, which was controversial, with a plot revolving around a time-traveling Crusades-era Syrian Islamic Assassin who assassinates various religious/historical figures as well as modern-day political leaders, with similarities to the present-day Assassin's Creed action game series, while the gameplay of Exile involved taking drugs that increase or decrease statistics and affect the player's heart-rate, displayed using a heart monitor.

In 1992, Final Fantasy V improved on the ATB system by introducing a time gauge to indicate to the player which character's turn is next, and it expanded the job system by offering more customization options with more than 22 job classes and giving each character greater flexibility by allowing them to learn secondary abilities from each job before changing classes. The job and ATB systems continued to be used in later Final Fantasy titles, and helped differentiate the series from the character class systems and turn-based systems of traditional CRPGs. 1992 also saw the release of Dragon Quest V, a game that has been praised for its involving, emotional family-themed narrative divided by different periods of time, something that has appeared in very few video games before or since. It has also been credited as the first known video game to feature a playable pregnancy, a concept that has since appeared in later games such as Story of Seasons, The Sims 2 and Fable II. Dragon Quest V's monster-collecting mechanic, where monsters can be defeated, captured, added to the party, and gain their own experience levels, also influenced many later franchises such as Pokémon, Digimon and Dokapon. In turn, the concept of collecting everything in a game, in the form of achievements or similar rewards, has since become a common trend in video games. Dragon Quest V also expanded the AI "Tactics" system of its predecessor by allowing each ally's AI routines to be set individually. Shin Megami Tensei, released in 1992 for the SNES, introduced an early moral alignment system that influences the direction and outcome of the storyline. It gave the player the freedom to choose between three different paths: Chaos, Law, and Neutral, none of which is portrayed as right or wrong. The deep personal choices the player makes throughout the game affects the protagonist's alignment, leading to different possible paths and multiple endings. This has since become a hallmark of the Megami Tensei series. Another non-linear RPG released that year was Romancing Saga, an open-world RPG by Square that offered many choices and allowed players to complete quests in any order, with the decision of whether or not to participate in any particular quest affecting the outcome of the storyline. The game also allowed players to choose from eight different characters, each with their own stories that start in different places and offer different outcomes. Romancing SaGa thus succeeded in providing a very different experience during each run through the game, something that later non-linear RPGs such as SaGa Frontier and Fable had promised but were unable to live up to. The SaGa series has since become known for its open-ended gameplay. The series is also known for having an activity-based progression system instead of experience levels, and since Romancing Saga, a combo system where up to five party members can perform a combined special attack. Unlike other RPGs at the time, Romancing SaGa also required characters to pay mentors to teach them abilities, whether it was using certain weapons or certain proficiencies like opening a chest or dismantling a trap. Data East's Heracles no Eikō III, written by Kazushige Nojima, introduced the plot element of a nameless immortal suffering from amnesia, and Nojima would later revisit the amnesia theme in Final Fantasy VII and Glory of Heracles. Climax Entertainment's Landstalker: The Treasures of King Nole was an early isometric RPG that combined the gameplay of an open-world action RPG with an isometric platformer, alongside an emphasis on varied puzzle-solving as well as strong characterization and humorous conversations. The TurboGrafx-CD port of Dragon Knight II released that year was also notable for introducing erotic adult content to consoles, though such content had often appeared in Japanese computer RPGs since the early 1980s. That same year, Game Arts began the Lunar series on the Sega CD with Lunar: The Silver Star, one of the first successful CD-ROM RPGs, featuring both voice and text, and considered one of the best RPGs in its time. The game was praised for its soundtrack, emotionally engaging storyline, and strong characterization. It also introduced an early form of level-scaling where the bosses would get stronger depending on the protagonist's level, a mechanic that was later used in Enix's The 7th Saga and extended to normal enemies in Square's Romancing Saga 3 and later Final Fantasy VIII.

===== Mid-1990s =====
In 1993, Square's Secret of Mana, the second in the Mana series, further advanced the action RPG subgenre with its introduction of cooperative multiplayer into the genre. The game was created by a team previously responsible for the first three Final Fantasy titles: Nasir Gebelli, Koichi Ishii, and Hiromichi Tanaka. It was intended to be one of the first CD-ROM RPGs, as a launch title for the SNES CD add-on, but had to be altered to fit onto a standard game cartridge after the SNES CD project was dropped. The game received considerable acclaim, for its innovative pausable real-time battle system, the "Ring Command" menu system, its innovative cooperative multiplayer gameplay, where the second or third players could drop in and out of the game at any time rather than players having to join the game at the same time, and the customizable AI settings for computer-controlled allies. The game has influenced a number of later action RPGs. That same year also saw the release of Phantasy Star IV: The End of the Millennium, which introduced the use of pre-programmable combat manoeuvers called 'macros', a means of setting up the player's party AI to deliver custom attack combos. Madou Monogatari, a 1989 MSX and PC-98 computer RPG ported to the Game Gear handheld console in 1993, had several unique features, including magic-oriented turn-based combat that completely lacked physical attacks, and the replacement of numerical statistics with visual representations, where the protagonist's condition is represented by her facial expressions and sprite graphics while experience is measured in jewels that encircle the screen, with the only visible numerical statistic being the collected gold. That year also saw the release of Romancing Saga 2, which further expanded the non-linear gameplay of its predecessor. While in the original Romancing Saga scenarios were changed according to dialogue choices during conversations, Romancing Saga 2 further expanded on this by having unique storylines for each character that can change depending on the player's actions, including who is chosen, what is said in conversation, what events have occurred, and who is present in the party. PCGamesN credits Romancing SaGa 2 for having laid the foundations for modern Japanese RPGs with its progressive, non-linear, open world design and subversive themes.

In 1994, Final Fantasy VI moved away from the medieval setting of its predecessors, instead being set in a steampunk environment. The game received considerable acclaim, and is seen as one of the greatest RPGs of all time, for improvements such as its broadened thematic scope, plotlines, characters, multiple-choice scenarios, and variation of play. Final Fantasy VI dealt with mature themes such as suicide, war crimes, child abandonment, teen pregnancy, and coping with the deaths of loved ones. Square's Live A Live, released for the Super Famicom in Japan, featured eight different characters and stories, with the first seven unfolding in any order the player chooses, as well as four different endings. The game's ninja chapter in particular was an early example of stealth game elements in an RPG, requiring the player to infiltrate a castle, rewarding the player if the entire chapter can be completed without engaging in combat. Other chapters had similar innovations, such as Akira's chapter where the character uses telepathic powers to discover information. That same year saw the release of the 3DO console port of the 1991 PC RPG Knights of Xentar, which had introduced a unique pausable real-time battle system, where characters automatically attack based on a list of different AI scripts chosen by the player. FromSoftware's first video game title, King's Field, a first-person RPG, is noted for being one of the earliest known 3D console role-playing games. In addition, the game is known for its difficulty and unconventional structure, and would go on to influence FromSoftware's future RPG titles including Shadow Tower and Demon's Souls, the latter described by its staff as a spiritual successor to King's Field. Robotrek by Quintet and Ancient was a predecessor to Pokémon in the sense that the protagonist does not himself fight, but sends out his robots to do so. Like Pokémon, Robotrek was designed to appeal to a younger audience, allowed team customization, and each robot was kept in a ball. However, unlike the mentioned game, the protagonist sometimes use Big Bombs or Weather as a defense.

During this period, comparatively few Eastern RPGs were released in Europe. The market for the genre was not as large as in Asia or North America, and the increasing amount of time and money required for translation as JRPGs became more text-heavy, in addition to the usual need to optimize the games for PAL systems, often made localizing the games to Europe a high-cost venture with little potential payoff. As a result, JRPG releases in Europe were largely limited to games which had previously been localized for North America, thus reducing the amount of translation required.

In 1995, Square's Chrono Trigger raised the standards for the genre, with certain aspects that were considered revolutionary in its time, including its nonlinear gameplay, branching plot, the "Active Time Event Logic" system, more than a dozen different endings, plot-related sidequests, a unique battle system with innovations such as combo attacks, and lack of random encounters. It also popularized the concept of New Game+. Chrono Trigger is frequently listed as one of the greatest video games of all time. That same year, Square's Romancing Saga 3 featured a storyline that could be told differently from the perspectives of up to eight different characters and introduced a level-scaling system where the enemies get stronger as the characters do, a mechanic that was later used in Final Fantasy VIII. Enix's Dragon Quest VI introduced an innovative scenario with a unique real world and dream world setting, which seems to have had an influence on the later Square role-playing games Chrono Cross and Final Fantasy X. Dragon Quest VI also improved on the inventory management of its predecessors with the addition of a bag to store extra items. Meanwhile, Quintet's Terranigma allowed players to shape the game world through town-building simulation elements, expanding on its 1992 predecessor Soul Blazer, while Square's Seiken Densetsu 3 allowed a number of different possible storyline paths and endings depending on which combination of characters the player selected. Beyond the Beyond introduced a turn-based battle system dubbed the "Active Playing System", which allows the player to increase the chances of landing an improved attack or defending from an attack by pressing the X button at the correct time during battle, similar to the timing-based attacks in the later game Final Fantasy VIII.

In 1996, the tactical RPG Fire Emblem: Genealogy of the Holy War gave players the ability to affect the relationships between different characters, which in turn affected the storyline as these relationships led to different characters appearing in the second generation of the game's plot. Enix released tri-Ace's sci-fi action RPG Star Ocean, which also gave players the ability to affect the relationships between different characters through its "private actions" social system, where the protagonist's relationship points with the other characters are affected by the player's choices, which in turn affects the storyline, leading to branching paths and multiple different endings. Treasure's Guardian Heroes allowed players to alter the storyline through their actions, such as choosing between a number of branching paths leading to multiple different endings and through the Karma meter which changes depending on whether the player kills civilians or shows mercy to enemies. That same year, the first installment of the Story of Seasons series introduced a new form of gameplay: a role-playing simulation centred around managing a farm. The series would later inspire popular social network games such as FarmVille in the late 2000s.

===== Late 1990s =====
Sega's Sakura Wars for the Saturn combined tactical RPG combat with dating sim and visual novel elements, introducing a real-time branching choice system where, during an event or conversation, the player must choose an action or dialogue choice within a time limit, or not to respond at all within that time; the player's choice, or lack thereof, affects the player character's relationship with other characters and in turn the characters' performance in battle, the direction of the storyline, and the ending. Later games in the series added several variations, including an action gauge that can be raised up or down depending on the situation, and a gauge that the player can manipulate using the analog stick depending on the situation. The success of Sakura Wars led to a wave of games that combine the RPG and dating sim genres, including Thousand Arms in 1998, Riviera: The Promised Land in 2002, and Luminous Arc in 2007.

Final Fantasy VII (1997), with its use of 3D graphics and CD-ROM discs, was an important milestone that popularized the genre worldwide.

The next major revolution came in the late 1990s, which saw the rise of 3D computer graphics and optical discs in fifth generation consoles. The implications for RPGs were enormous—longer, more involved quests, better audio, and full-motion video. This was clearly demonstrated in 1997 by the phenomenal success of Final Fantasy VII, which is considered one of the most influential games of all time, akin to that of Star Wars in the movie industry. With a record-breaking production budget of around $45 million, the ambitious scope of Final Fantasy VII raised the possibilities for the genre, with its more expansive world to explore, much longer quest, more numerous sidequests, dozens of minigames, and much higher production values. The latter includes innovations such as the use of 3D characters on pre-rendered backgrounds, battles viewed from multiple different angles rather than a single angle, and for the first time full-motion CGI video seamlessly blended into the gameplay, effectively integrated throughout the game. Gameplay innovations included the materia system, which allowed a considerable amount of customization and flexibility through materia that can be combined in many different ways and exchanged between characters at any time, and the limit breaks, special attacks that can be performed after a character's limit meter fills up by taking hits from opponents. The materia system is similar to, but more sophisticated than, the slotted item system in Diablo II (2000). Final Fantasy VII continues to be listed among the best games of all time, for its highly polished gameplay, high playability, lavish production, well-developed characters, intricate storyline, and an emotionally engaging narrative that is much darker and sophisticated than most other RPGs. The game's storytelling and character development was considered a major narrative jump forward for video games and was often compared to films and novels at the time.

The explosion of Final Fantasy VII's sales and the ascendance of the PlayStation represented the dawning of a new era of RPGs. Backed by a clever multimillion-dollar marketing campaign, Final Fantasy VII brought RPGs to a much wider console audience and played a key role in the success of the PlayStation gaming console. Following the success of Final Fantasy VII, console RPGs, previously a niche genre outside Japan, skyrocketed in popularity across the world. The game was soon ported to the PC. The game was also responsible not only for popularizing RPGs on consoles, but its high production budget played a key role in the rising costs of video game development in general, and it led to Square's foray into films with Final Fantasy: The Spirits Within.

Later in 1997, Square released SaGa Frontier, which expands on the non-linear gameplay of its Romancing Saga predecessors. It has a setting that spans multiple planets and an overarching plot that becomes apparent after playing through each of the different characters' quests that tie together at certain places. The characters have several different possible endings each, and there can be up to 15 characters in the party at the same time, organized into three groups of five characters. The ambitious amount of freedom the game offered was a departure from most RPGs in its time, but this led to a mixed reception due to its lack of direction. Quintet's 1997 release The Granstream Saga was an early fully 3D action RPG that had a unique third-person one-on-one combat system and a storyline that, while being mostly linear, offered a difficult moral choice towards the end of the game regarding which of two characters to save, each leading to a different ending. LandStalker's 1997 spiritual successor Alundra is considered "one of the finest examples of action/RPG gaming", combining platforming elements and challenging puzzles with an innovative storyline revolving around entering people's dreams and dealing with mature themes.

In 1998, Square's Xenogears was acclaimed for the ambitious scope of its storyline, which spanned millennia and explored themes rarely dealt with in video games, including topics such as religion and the origin of mankind, and social commentary dealing with racism, poverty, war, and human psychology, along with narrative references to the philosophies of Sigmund Freud, Carl Jung and Friedrich Nietzsche. It is today considered one of the greatest examples of video game storytelling. That year also saw the rise of monster-collecting RPGs which, although originating from Megami Tensei, Dragon Quest V, and Robotrek, was further advanced and popularized by Pokémon, which featured multiplayer gameplay and was released in North America that year. Pokémon has since become the best-selling RPG franchise of all time. Another 1998 title, Suikoden II, was acclaimed for its "winding, emotionally charged narrative" that involved recruiting an army and gave players the choice of whether to "redeem or kill" key characters. The same year also saw the release of The Legend of Zelda: Ocarina of Time, which was considered an action RPG at the time and was "poised to shape the action RPG genre for years to come". While it is still considered one of the best games of all time, its status as an action RPG continues to be debated, much likes its predecessors.

In 1999, the cinematic trend set by Final Fantasy VII continued with Final Fantasy VIII, which introduced characters with a proportionately sized human appearance. The game also featured a level-scaling system where the enemies scale in level along with the player's party. Similar level-scaling mechanics have been used in a number of later RPGs, including The Elder Scrolls IV: Oblivion, Silverfall, Dragon Age: Origins, Fable II, Fallout 3, and The Elder Scrolls V: Skyrim. Square also expanded on the non-linearity of SaGa Frontier with their 1999 action RPG Legend of Mana, the most open-ended in the Mana series, allowing the player to build the game world they choose, complete any quests and subplots they choose in any order of their choice, and choose which storyline paths to follow, departing from most other action RPGs in its time. That same year, Square's survival horror RPG Parasite Eve II featured branching storylines and up to three different possible endings, while the sci-fi RPG Star Ocean: The Second Story boasted as many as 86 different endings, with each of the possible permutations to these endings numbering in the hundreds, setting a benchmark for the amount of outcomes possible for a video game. Using a relationship system inspired by dating sims, each of the characters in Star Ocean had friendship points and relationship points with each of the other characters, allowing the player to pair together, or ship, any couples (both romantic heterosexual relationships as well as friendships) of their choice, allowing a form of fan fiction to exist within the game itself. This type of social system was later extended to allow romantic lesbian relationships in BioWare's 2007 sci-fi RPG Mass Effect. However, the relationship system in Star Ocean not only affected the storyline, but also the gameplay, affecting the way the characters behave towards each other in battle. Another 1999 RPG, Persona 2, also featured dating elements, including the option to engage in a homosexual relationship. That same year saw the release of Chrono Cross, which became the third game to receive a perfect score from GameSpot, after The Legend of Zelda: Ocarina of Time and Soulcalibur. The game featured two major parallel dimensions, where the player must go back and forth between the worlds to recruit party members, obtain items, and advance the plot, with events in one dimension influencing the other. Like its predecessor Chrono Trigger, Chrono Cross featured a New Game+ option and multiple endings, with at least a dozen possible endings based on the player's actions.

===== Early 2000s =====
In 2000, Phantasy Star Online on the Dreamcast introduced online gaming to consoles and was responsible for pushing console gamers "to dial up with the Dreamcast to play online and to experience a new style of play". It resulted in taking "consoles online" and defining "small-scale multiplayer RPGs", paving the way for larger-scale MMORPG efforts such as Final Fantasy XI, setting the template for small-scale online RPGs such as Capcom's Monster Hunter series and some of the later Dragon Quest and Final Fantasy games, and giving rise to "an entire pantheon of multiplayer dungeon crawlers that continue to dominate the Japanese sales charts". More generally, Phantasy Star Online made "both online gaming and the concept of fee-based services a reality for consoles", paving the way for the online gaming services later provided by all three of the seventh-generation consoles. That same year, Vagrant Story introduced a pausable real-time battle system based on targeting individual body parts, using both melee and bow & arrow weapons; similar body-targeting battle systems were later used in Bethesda's Fallout 3 (2008) and Nippon Ichi's Last Rebellion (2010). That year also saw the release of the PlayStation 2, which would become the best-selling game console of all time, due in large part to its large variety of Japanese RPGs (including franchises such as Final Fantasy, Grandia, and Tales) that established its dominance over the RPG market.

In 2001, Final Fantasy X made advancements in portraying realistic emotions through voice-overs and detailed facial expressions, which have since become a staple of the series, with Final Fantasy X-2 and other subsequent titles (such as Dirge of Cerberus: Final Fantasy VII and Final Fantasy XII) also featuring this development. It also replaced an overworld map with the traversing of real-time 3D environments, which has also become a standard of the series, as demonstrated in Final Fantasy XI, XII and XIII. The game introduced several other gameplay elements to the series, such as its Conditional Turn-Based Battle System and Overdrive Limit Breaks. It became a major worldwide success, largely due to its "dynamic" presentation, "movie-quality CGI" cutscenes, and "well-scripted, well-acted dialogue", that helped it become a major success, helping to establish the PlayStation 2 as "the console of choice for gamers looking for a cinematic experience and narrative polish" that had been lacking in most previous RPGs. Around the same time, the first entry in the Shadow Hearts series was released. The series would later be acclaimed for its darker Lovecraftian horror narrative revolving around "an emotional journey through the reluctant anti-hero's quest toward redemption". Much like the Chrono series, the Shadow Hearts games offer multiple endings.

In 2002, Final Fantasy XI for the PlayStation 2 (and later the PC and Xbox 360) introduced the massively multiplayer online role-playing game genre to consoles. In 2003, Final Fantasy X-2 for the PlayStation 2 followed the "stylish narrative formula" established by Final Fantasy X, though with a more "Charlie's Angels-esque" approach. That same year saw the release of the more experimental Shin Megami Tensei III: Nocturne, the third main entry in the Shin Megami Tensei series. Much like its predecessors, it was "psychologically challenging" and featured a branching narrative with multiple endings. Nocturne "carved out a toehold for the series in America with its post-apocalyptic adventure set in a bombed-out Japan" where instead of "trying to stop the apocalypse", the "demonic main character's end goal is to assert his will on the new world".

===== Mid 2000s =====
In 2003, Konami's Game Boy Advance handheld video game Boktai: The Sun Is in Your Hand had a unique stealth-based action gameplay that made use of a solar-power sensor.

In 2004, Dragon Quest VIII was released and became the first game in the Dragon Quest series to have 3D graphics and voice acting. Capcom released Monster Hunter, the first title of the franchise, for the PlayStation 2. The game introduced up-to 8 players team based online hunting gameplay-style. On handhelds, Kingdom Hearts: Chain of Memories, Dragon Quest V: Hand of the Heavenly Bride, and Fire Emblem: The Sacred Stones were released.

In 2005, Kingdom Hearts II was released, which solidified the Kingdom Hearts series as the new JRPG series. Fire Emblem: Path of Radiance, developed by Intelligent Systems and published by Nintendo, was released for the GameCube. Other notable releases include Drakengard 2, Xenosaga Episode II: Jenseits von Gut und Böse, Radiata Stories, Romancing SaGa -Minstrel Song-, Tales of the Abyss, and Tales of Legendia. On handhelds, Pokémon Mystery Dungeon, Final Fantasy IV Advance and Metal Gear Acid were released.

In 2006, Final Fantasy XII was released. It was the first Final Fantasy game to have enemies on the field, seamless battle transitions, an open world, a controllable camera and customizable AI. When it was released it became the first Final Fantasy game to get a perfect score from Famitsu Weekly magazine. Other notable releases are Suikoden V, Xenosaga Episode III: Also sprach Zarathustra, and .hack//G.U. vol.3//Redemption.

==== Relative decline (late 2000s) ====
In 2006, Persona 3, developed by Atlus for the PlayStation 2, was released. Other notable releases are Wild ARMs 5, Eternal Sonata, Final Fantasy Crystal Chronicles: My Life as a King and Tales of Symphonia: Knight of Ratatosk.

In 2008, Lost Odyssey, developed by Mistwalker and Feelplus for the Xbox 360, was released. Other notable releases are Persona 4, Tales of Vesperia, Disgaea 3: Absence of Justice and Valkyria Chronicles.

In 2009, Demon's Souls, developed by FromSoftware for the PlayStation 3, was released. The game received notable awards by video game media including GameSpot's Game of the Year, GameTrailers' Best RPG, IGN's Best RPG for the PS3, and PC World's Game of the Year.

Handheld game consoles, however, particularly Nintendo handhelds such as the Nintendo DS, have featured a number of innovative RPGs during the late 2000s. Square Enix's The World Ends with You (2007) featured a unique dual-screen action combat system that involves controlling two characters at the same time. Level-5's Inazuma Eleven (2008) introduced unique soccer football RPG gameplay incorporating sports game elements. The Atlus title Shin Megami Tensei: Devil Survivor (2009) blends together both traditional and tactical RPG gameplay along with non-linear adventure game elements as well as an innovative demon auction system and a death clock system where each character has a specified time of death and the player's actions has consequences on who lives and dies. On the PlayStation Portable (PSP), Half-Minute Hero (2009) is a role-playing shooter featuring self-referential humour and a 30-second time limit for each level and boss encounter. Infinite Space (2009) by PlatinumGames is a hybrid of tactical role-playing game, real-time strategy and space simulator elements, and features a non-linear branching narrative with numerous choices that can have dramatic consequences, and an epic scale spanning hundreds of planets.

==== Aftermath (early 2010s) ====
In the early 2010s, new intellectual properties such as Xenoblade Chronicles from Monolith Soft and The Last Story from Mistwalker found a home on Nintendo's Wii console late in its lifespan, gaining unanimously solid reviews. Many reviewers claimed the games revitalized the genre, keeping its best traits while modernizing other gameplay elements which could appeal to a wide audience. Xenoblade, in particular, revitalized the genre with an extremely expansive open world. However, Nintendo of America announced its decision to not localize the games, not having enough faith in their commercial appeal to American audiences. In response, a widespread internet campaign known as "Operation Rainfall" petitioned the release of Xenoblade, The Last Story, and Pandora's Tower in America, with participants flooding Nintendo's official Facebook page with requests and sending mail to NOA's headquarters. The former two games were released in America in 2012, with Xenoblade debuting at the top of GameStop's best seller list the week of its release. Despite this, the sales of both games were far less than those of console WRPGs such as Mass Effect 2 and Fallout 3.

On handhelds, the 2010 Atlus title Radiant Historia introduced a unique take on the concept of non-linear branching storylines that gives the player the freedom to alter the course of history through time travel across two parallel timelines. The 2010 PSP version of Tactics Ogre features a similar "World" system that allows players to revisit key plot points and make different choices to see how the story unfolds differently. Imageepoch's 2011 title Saigo no Yakusoku no Monogatari (Final Promise Story) for the PSP has a strategic command-based battle system where enemies learn from previous skirmishes and where characters can die permanently during gameplay which in turn affects the game's storyline.

In 2011, Nintendo made a conscious effort to revitalize the Pokémon brand with the Pokémon Black & White duology, which streamlined the battle system and introduced an entirely new lineup of characters in a new region based on New York City. These games were followed up with a direct numbered sequel in 2012, a first for the main series. 2012 also saw the release of Pokémon Conquest, a crossover with the Nobunaga's Ambition series of strategy role-playing games.

In 2012 and onwards, a surge in new JRPGs such as Xenoblade Chronicles, Persona 4 Golden, Fire Emblem Awakening, Shin Megami Tensei 4, Tales of Graces, Kingdom Hearts 3D: Dream Drop Distance, Etrian Odyssey IV: Legends of the Titan, Ni no Kuni: Wrath of the White Witch and Tales of Xillia are generally well received by fans of the genre and some critics while a number of popular WRPGs such as Mass Effect 3 and the PC version of Diablo III suffered from poor feedback by non-critic reviewers, especially on Metacritic. JRPG installments from mainstream franchises such as Paper Mario: Sticker Star performed well below expectations, continuing the decline of mainstream JRPG franchises except Pokémon. With the exception of Pokémon games, individual JRPG sales continue to pale in comparison against individual WRPGs such as The Elder Scrolls V: Skyrim and Guild Wars 2. However, JRPGs released by Nintendo continue to prosper, with Dragon Quest IX, Fire Emblem Awakening, and Bravely Default selling well above expectations for the genre, and Final Fantasy XIV has reported such a strong revenue that Square Enix, its publisher, had expected turning a profit, so while certain games may still be ill-received, others are performing fairly well.

==== New directions and renaissance (2010s–present) ====
Hunting RPGs are a type of action RPG subgenre featuring the player and an optional team of up to three other players hunting down larger monsters with a set amount of time, using weapons crafted from the materials extracted from the map and/or from the monsters themselves. Unlike most RPG genres, the monsters have no health bars or hit points, but have stronger attack and defense stats, forcing the players to use survival items and coordinated strategies to eliminate a specific monster. First appeared in Capcom's Monster Hunter franchise, these games later expanded the hunting RPG genre into other games as well, such as Bandai Namco Entertainment's God Eater franchise.

Soulslike games are a relatively new genre born due to popularity of the Dark Souls series. Those games generally have common elements like high difficulty, high-risk combat with hard-hitting enemies, sparse checkpoints, and enemies dropping souls (or some other resource used for upgrading stats and/or weapons that is lost upon death), but the player has one chance to regain the dropped souls if they can reach the place of their death without dying again.

Since 2016, Japanese RPGs have been experiencing a resurgence, as part of a renaissance for the Japanese video game industry. In 2016, the global success of Pokémon Go helped Pokémon Sun and Moon set sales records around the world. Final Fantasy XV was also a major success, selling millions. There were also other Japanese RPGs that earned commercial success and/or critical acclaim that year, including Dragon Quest VII: Fragments of the Forgotten Past, Shin Megami Tensei IV: Apocalypse, Bravely Second, Fire Emblem Fates, Dragon Quest Builders, World of Final Fantasy, Exist Archive, and I am Setsuna.

In 2017, Japanese RPGs gained further commercial success and greater critical acclaim. The year started with Gravity Rush 2, followed by Yakuza 0, which some critics consider the best in the Yakuza series, Nioh which is considered to have one of the eighth-generation's best RPG combat systems, and then Nier Automata which has gameplay and storytelling thought to be some of the best in recent years. Persona 5 won the Best Role Playing Game award at The Game Awards 2017. Some Japanese RPGs that were previously considered niche gained notoriety, and became million-sellers in 2017, including Persona 5, Nier: Automata, Nioh, and Xenoblade Chronicles 2 on the Nintendo Switch. 2017 was considered a strong year for Japanese RPGs, with other notable releases including Dragon Quest VIII on the Nintendo 3DS, Tales of Berseria, Valkyria Revolution, Ever Oasis, Final Fantasy XII: The Zodiac Age, Ys VIII, Etrian Odyssey V, Dragon Quest Heroes II, The Legend of Heroes: Trails in the Sky the 3rd, Fire Emblem Echoes: Shadows of Valentia, Final Fantasy XIV: Stormblood, and Tokyo Xanadu.

2018's Monster Hunter: World sold over 10 million copies, becoming Capcom's best-selling single software title. Square Enix's Dragon Quest XI: Echoes of an Elusive Age sold over four million copies. Its launch was the franchise's best in North America. A retro-inspired turn-based JRPG Octopath Traveler sold over 1 million units exclusively on the Nintendo Switch. Dragon Quest spin-off sandbox action RPG Dragon Quest Builders debuted in the west. Ni no Kuni II: Revenant Kingdom earned critical acclaims and sold over a million copies. The first main game on a home console Pokémon: Let's Go, Pikachu! and Let's Go, Eevee! sold 10 million units. SEGA's Ryu ga Gotoku Stadio released Yakuza 6: The Song of Life, Yakuza Kiwami 2 and Fist of the North Star: Lost Paradise. 2018 saw a decent amount of JRPG remasters from the past generations including Dark Souls: Remastered, Shining Resonance Refrain, The World Ends with You: Final Remix, The Last Remnant: Remastered, Secret of Mana, Dragon's Crown Pro and Shenmue I & II. On handhelds, Atlus released The Alliance Alive, Radiant Historia: Perfect Chronology, and Shin Megami Tensei: Strange Journey Redux. Other notable games include The Legend of Heroes: Trails of Cold Steel II, Lost Sphear, Valkyria Chronicles 4, Monster Hunter Generations Ultimate, and Xenoblade Chronicles 2: Torna – The Golden Country.

In 2019, Square Enix released Kingdom Hearts III selling over 5 million copies in the first month. Sekiro: Shadows Die Twice earned both critical and commercial success reaching nearly 4 million sales. With the release of a large expansion Final Fantasy XIV: Shadowbringers, the game marked over a million active players. Nintendo's tactical role-playing game Fire Emblem: Three Houses earned critical acclaim. Capcom released Monster Hunter World: Iceborne. Square Enix released Dragon Quest XI S: Echoes of an Elusive Age – Definitive Edition for the Nintendo Switch. There were notable remasters released in 2019 including Tales of Vesperia: Definitive Edition, Final Fantasy VIII Remastered, and Ni no Kuni: Wrath of the White Witch Remastered. On handhelds, Mario & Luigi: Bowser's Inside Story + Bowser Jr.'s Journey and Persona Q2: New Cinema Labyrinth both for the 3DS were released. Other notable JRPGs include God Eater 3, Dragon Quest Builders 2, Oninaki, and Code Vein.

== South Korean role-playing games ==
=== 1980s–1990s ===
South Korea's RPG industry began in the early 1980/ with licensed and translated versions of international titles. Later on, The country's first fully-fledged computer RPG was Sin'geom-ui Jeonseol, also known as Legend of the Sword, released for the Apple II computer platform in 1987. It was programmed by Nam In-Hwan and distributed by Aproman, and was primarily influenced by the Ultima series. In the late 1980s, the Korean company Topia began producing action role-playing games, one of which was Pungnyu Hyeopgaek for the MS-DOS in 1989. It was the first Korean title published for IBM PC compatibles and is set in ancient Korea and ancient China. Another action RPG released by Topia that same year was Mirae Sonyeon Conan, a video game adaptation of Hayao Miyazaki's Japanese 1978 anime series Future Boy Conan, for the MSX2 platform.

1994 saw the release of two major Korean RPGs: Astonishia Story, and an MS-DOS enhanced remake Ys II Special, developed by Mantra. The latter was a mash-up of Nihon Falcom's game Ys II (1988) with the anime Ys II: Castle in the Heavens (1992) along with a large amount of new content, including more secrets than any other version of Ys II. Both games were a success in Korea, Astonishia Story more so.

Commercial online gaming became very popular in South Korea from the mid-1990s. Nexus: The Kingdom of the Winds, designed by Jake Song, was commercially released in 1996 and eventually gained over one million subscribers. It was one of the earliest massively multiplayer online role-playing games. Song's next game, Lineage (1998), enjoyed even greater success gaining millions of subscribers in Korea and Taiwan. This helped to secure developer NCsoft's dominance in the global MMORPG market for several years.

=== 2000s–present ===
In 2002, the sprite-based Ragnarok Online, produced by Korean company Gravity Corp, was released. Though unknown to many Western players, the game took Asia by storm as Lineage had done. The publisher has claimed in excess of 25 million subscribers of the game, although this number is based upon a quantity of registered users (rather than active subscribers). 2002 also saw the release of MapleStory, another sprite-based title, which was completely free-to-play—instead of charging a monthly fee, it generated revenue by selling in-game "enhancements". MapleStory would go on to become a major player in the new market for free-to-play MMORPGs (generating huge numbers of registered accounts across its many versions), if it did not introduce the market by itself.

In October 2003, Lineage II (NCsoft's sequel to Lineage) became the latest MMORPG to achieve huge success across Asia. It received the Presidential Award at the 2003 Korean Game awards. As of the first half of 2005, Lineage II counted over 2.25 million subscribers worldwide, with servers in Japan, China, North America, Taiwan, and Europe, once the popularity of the game had surged in the West. To date, the Lineage franchise has attracted 43 million players.

== Chinese and Taiwanese role-playing games ==
Ruyiji was released in Taiwan in 1986. It's a role-playing game and the first commercial Chinese game.

Xuan-Yuan Sword, a Taiwanese role-playing game based on Chinese mythology, was released in 1990. It has become a series and its latest sequel was released in 2020.

Heroes of Jin Yong (1996), a Taiwanese tactical role-playing game based on the popular historical wuxia novels by Jin Yong, featured a number of melee and ranged kung fu skills to train and develop, as well as a grid-based movement system.

China has a number of domestically produced games. These include Westward Journey, Perfect World, and The Incorruptible Warrior. There are a large number of domestically-produced MMORPGs in China, although many generally remain unheard of outside the country.

Genshin Impact (2020), a Chinese open-world action role-playing game, features an action-based battle system involving elemental magic and character switching, and it also uses gacha game monetization for players to obtain new characters, weapons, and other resources. According to some media reports, Genshin Impact was the biggest international launch of any Chinese video game at the time of its release.

== Criticism ==
Japanese developer Naoki Yoshida, known for Dragon Quest and Final Fantasy, stated in an interview with SkillUp through a translator that the development team doesn't think of their games as "JRPG". He said the term first appeared "15 years ago" and was thought of as discriminatory. Specifically recalling media referring to Final Fantasy 7 as a "JRPG" in a way of "compartmentalizing". Yoshida thought these feeling of "being made fun of" may remain as a memory. Inverse opined afterwards that JRPG is "archaic" and it is better to use alternatives.

== See also ==
- Cultural differences in role-playing video games
- History of Western role-playing video games
- Dating sim
- Visual novel
