= Crazy Mouse =

2008 video game

- Developer: Ultizen Games
- Publisher: Ultizen Games
- Platform: Xbox 360
- Release: NA: October 15, 2008
- Genre: Puzzle
- Modes: Single-player, multiplayer

Crazy Mouse is the first Chinese-developed video game to be developed and released for Xbox Live Arcade on the Xbox 360. The game was released on October 15, 2008.

== Gameplay ==
Gameplay screenshot

The game has 32 levels in which the player guides a mouse through a vibrantly-colored maze, attempting to grab and eat food, run, dodge and score, depending on the level. There are two single player modes:

1. Story: sequential puzzles where the player earns a score and rank on each puzzle
2. Battle: player competes against a number of mice to see who can score the most points in the shortest time

The game supports up to both co-op and competitive four player multiplayer, locally or over Xbox Live.

== Reception ==
Crazy Mouse received negative reviews from critics. On Metacritic, the game holds a score of 28/100 based on 5 reviews. GameSpot rated the game a 3/10, criticizing its gameplay, controls and art while ultimately describing it as "uninspired rehash." IGN also gave the game a low rating at 2.5/10, describing it as "a weak adaptation of the Pac-Man formula."
