= Fantasy Westward Journey =

2001 video game

Fantasy Westward Journey (simplified Chinese: 梦幻西游; traditional Chinese: 夢幻西遊; pinyin: Mèng Huàn Xī Yóu) is a massively multiplayer online role-playing game (MMORPG) developed and operated by the Chinese company NetEase. It was released for the Microsoft Windows platform in December 2001. The game is the most popular online game in China as of May 2007 by peak concurrent users (PCU), with a peak count of 1.5 million. Registered users reached 25 million by April 2005, with 576,000 peak concurrent players on 198 game servers, which was considered the fastest-growing online game in China at the time. Average concurrent users were reported in August 2006 to be around 400,000.

The game uses the same engine as Westward Journey II, albeit with a distinctively different graphical style. Both games are inspired by the 16th-century Chinese novel Journey to the West. Together with Westward Journey II, it is one of the highest-grossing video games of all time, having earned an estimated $6.5 billion in lifetime revenue as of 2019 and having 400 million users as of 2015.

== History ==
In July 2006, administrators at NetEase dissolved a 700-member in-game anti-Japanese guild and locked the account of its founder for having an anti-Japanese username. A mass in-game protest took place days later on July 7, the anniversary of the beginning of the Second Sino-Japanese War, with up to 80,000 users joining the online protest on one of the game's servers.

Total registered users of Fantasy Westward Journey had reached 310 million as of 2015.

== Mobile version ==
A mobile version of the game was released for the Apple iOS and Google Android operating systems in 2015. It had grossed over $800 million in China alone by 2016. In 2017, it grossed $1.5 billion worldwide, bringing the mobile version's total revenue to approximately $2.3 billion by 2017.

Fantasy Westward Journey launched its first 3D animation in 2015. After release on the Chinese mainstream online video platform, it successively launched on several Chinese television stations.

== See also ==
- Westward Journey Online II
