= Last Rebellion =

2010 video game

- North American box art
- Developers: Nippon Ichi Software; Hit Maker
- Publishers: JP: Nippon Ichi Software; NA: NIS America; EU: Tecmo Koei
- Engine: PhyreEngine
- Platform: PlayStation 3
- Release: JP: January 28, 2010; NA: February 23, 2010; EU: March 26, 2010
- Genre: Action role-playing
- Mode: Single-player

Last Rebellion (Note: Japanese: ラストリベリオン, Hepburn: Rasuto Riberion) is an action role-playing video game developed by Nippon Ichi Software and Hit Maker exclusively for the PlayStation 3. It was published by Nippon Ichi Software in Japan as well as in North America and Tecmo Koei in Europe . The game was released on January 28, 2010, in Japan, in North America on February 23, 2010, and in Europe on March 26, 2010. The game received negative reviews from critics.

== Plot ==
The game takes place in the world of Junovald which is governed by the will of two gods: Meitilia and Formival. Meitilia is the god of death, presiding over the destruction of life while Formival is the god of life, presiding over the birth of all life and the creation of everything. Meitilia is said to have blessed two types of people - Blades and Sealers - with special powers. Blades have the unparalleled power to destroy things physically while Sealers have the magical power to destroy souls.

Formival's power on the other hand grants him the ability to revive any dead object. Creatures in the face of death allow their souls to escape from their body; once escaped these souls are controlled by fragments of what is known as Formival's Soul. The souls of the creatures would then manifest into monsters which are more powerful and stronger than before. These creatures are known as the Belzeds, which cannot be killed by normal means - instead requiring the skills of both a Blade and a Sealer to destroy both its body and soul.

The game follows the main protagonist, Nine Asfel, whose homeland was ravaged by civil war nine years ago, leading to the land becoming a nesting ground for the Belzeds. A group of Sorcerers, Necromancers, and Wizards had created a barrier surrounding the kingdom to prevent a massacre by the Belzeds. In order to solve the problem of the Belzeds, King Arzelide summoned Nine whose skills are widely recognized as the best of the blades and Aisha, whose Sealer powers have isolated her from the rest of kingdom, to eliminate the Belzeds.

== Gameplay ==
Gameplay screenshot of Nine fighting against a Belzed.

Exploration is free-roaming, but in combat, the mechanics become turn-based. The battle system will allow the player to target specific body parts of an enemy, and the reaction will be realistic; hence, if you shoot out the legs of an opponent, his or her movement will be drastically reduced, while blows to the arms will weaken their attacks. By strategically striking key areas of the body, players can strip the enemy of their ability to fight. Players can switch back and forth between the two characters during battle. Since Nine and Aisha share a single turn, the player must strategically choose which character will execute their attacks first.

== Characters ==
- Nine Asfel

He is a powerful Blade whose Belzed hunting records have brought much infamy. He is free-spirited and remains calm despite the attention he receives for being a Blade. He dislikes being bound to a single place or a set of rules and usually speaks sarcastically and without regard for the feelings of the people around him.

- Aisha Romandine

She is a Sealer gifted - and cursed - with exceptional potential. Her extraordinary powers have led to her sometimes being unable to properly control them, leading to the loss of many innocent lives. The people had her locked away from the rest of the world for fear of such accidents, leading her to be protected and cared for by the Imperial authorities. She is proud, strong and often stands up for what she thinks is right.

- Alfred Formillo

He is the younger brother of Nine, he was adopted and raised by the king at a young age leading to his persona being a complete opposite of Nine. He is also a Blade possessing formidable powers as a necromancer, often focusing on the task at hand and possesses a strong sense of duty. Like Nine however he is honest and extremely blunt.

- Azelride Lorvin

He is the king of the country and is a sorcerer who possesses unprecedented skill, giving him the title of the Keeper of Lorvin. He had previously used his power to form a great barrier around his kingdom to protect it during the later Great War.

- Meiktillia

She is praised as being the god of death and destruction, the opposite of Formival. She is known as the one who destroys and absorbs all of life. Her power is what provides Nine and Aisha with their abilities as a Blade and Sealer. She grows interested in them and grants them even more power than before.

== Development ==
The game was first announced on May 8, 2009, by Nippon Ichi Software for an October 2009 release. However it was announced on November 2, 2009, that the game would be delayed to an early 2010 release. On November 4, 2009, Nippon Ichi Software announced that the game would be released in Japan on January 28, 2010. On December 22, 2009, it was revealed that the game would be released in North America in February 2010. On January 16, 2010, it was announced that the game would be released in Europe on March 12, 2010, and would be published by Tecmo Koei.

== Reception ==
Reception

Aggregate score
Aggregator	Score
Metacritic	44/100

Review scores
Publication	Score
Destructoid	5/10
Eurogamer	3/10
Famitsu	24/40
Game Informer	4.5/10
GameRevolution	D−
GameSpot	3.5/10
GameZone	6/10
IGN	3/10
PlayStation: The Official Magazine	3/5
RPGamer	1.5/5
RPGFan	74%
Teletext GameCentral	3/10

The game received "unfavorable" reviews according to the review aggregation website Metacritic. In Japan, Famitsu gave it a score of one seven, two sixes, and one five for a total of 24 out of 40.

The game was not profitable for Nippon Ichi, the publisher who had worked with Hit Maker on the game. Nippon Ichi CEO Sōhei Niikawa apologized about it in an interview with Dengeki Online, and said that it led to restructuring internally where some in-development projects of unclear quality were dropped to concentrate on fewer, better games. NIS America's president, Haru Akenaga, stated that the game was "not the kind of title we should release in the United States because of its quality", and that he felt "really sorry for our customers because we released that title".
