= Westward Journey Online II =

Video game developed and run by NetEase

Westward Journey Online II (Chinese: 大话西游 Online II) is a MMORPG developed and run by NetEase. After its initial release it began experiencing serious technical problems and was closed for reworking, to be reopened several months later as "Westward Journey II". Another MMORPG, Fantasy Westward Journey, uses the same engine with a different graphical style. Westward Journey is one of the most popular online games in China, with a peak concurrent user count of 588,000 as of March 2005 and with over 56 million registered accounts, ranking it in the top 3 MMORPG games in China at the time. Registered users reached 83 million by July 2006.

The content of the game is heavily inspired by classical Chinese literature: the title is a reference to one such source, Journey to the West. Unlike many Western MMORPG's, the games feature prominent nudity and anti-religious themes. "Westward Journey II" met with controversy when the State party closed it for several months, due to criticism of the party in-game.
