= Incorruptible Warrior =

2007 video game

Qing Lian Zhan Shi
- Release: July 25, 2007
- Genre: Online role-playing game
- Mode: Online multiplayer

Qing Lian Zhan Shi (Chinese: 清廉战士, literally "The Incorruptible Warrior") is a Chinese video game. The player takes on the role of protagonist who battles corrupt government officials as well as their children and mistresses. The game received financial sponsoring from the Chinese Communist Party Disciplinary Committee of the Haishu district in Ningbo city.

Just weeks after its launch, the game attracted so many users that its servers crashed and it had to be taken offline for upgrades.
