= Video games in Japan =

Japan's video game industry

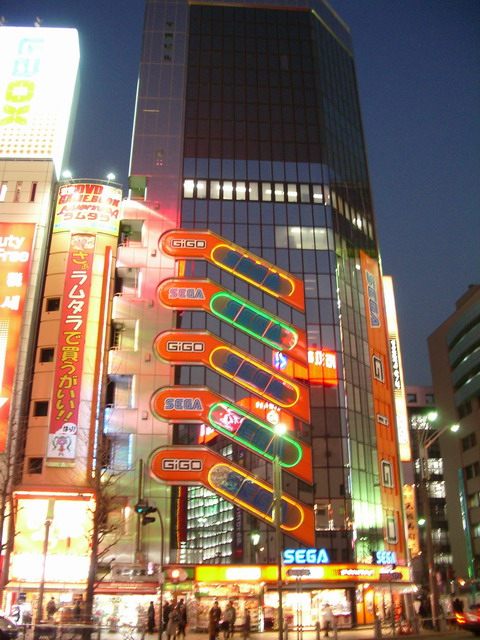
Sega Akihabara Building 2, known as GiGO until 2017, a former large 6 floor Sega game center on Chuo Dori, in front of the LAOX Aso-Bit-City in Akihabara, Tokyo, Japan, in 2006

Video games are a major industry in Japan, and the country is considered one of the most influential in video gaming. Japanese game development is often identified with the golden age of video games and the country is home to many notable video game companies such as Nintendo, Sega, Bandai Namco Entertainment, Taito, Konami, Square Enix, Capcom, NEC, SNK, Koei Tecmo, Atlus, Arc System Works, Marvelous, Nippon Ichi Software, Level-5, Irem, Nihon Falcom, Sony and formerly its branch Sony Computer Entertainment. In 2022, Japan was the third largest video game market in the world after the United States and China.

The space is known for the catalogs of several major publishers, all of whom have competed in the video game console and video arcade markets at various points. Released in 1965, Periscope was a major arcade hit in Japan, preceding several decades of success in the arcade industry there. Nintendo, a former hanafuda playing card vendor, rose to prominence during the 1980s with the release of the home video game console called the Family Computer (Famicom), which became a major hit as the Nintendo Entertainment System (NES) internationally. Sony, already one of the world's largest electronics manufacturers, entered the market in 1994 with the Sony PlayStation, one of the first home consoles to feature 3D graphics, almost immediately establishing itself as a major publisher in the space. Shigeru Miyamoto remains internationally renowned as a "father of video gaming" and is the only game developer so far to receive Japan's highest civilian honor for artists, the 文化功労者 (bunka kōrōsha) or Person of Cultural Merit.

Arcade culture is a major influence among young Japanese, with Akihabara Electric Town being a major nexus of so-called otaku culture in Japan, which overlaps with video gaming heavily. Japanese video game franchises such as Super Mario, Pokémon, The Legend of Zelda, Resident Evil, Silent Hill, Metal Gear, Devil May Cry, Final Fantasy, Sonic the Hedgehog, Fire Emblem, Super Smash Bros., Street Fighter, Kirby, Animal Crossing, Splatoon, Xenoblade, Dragon Quest, Tekken, Kingdom Hearts, Persona, Dark Souls, Monster Hunter and many others have gained critical acclaim and continue to garner a large worldwide following. The Japanese role-playing game is a major game genre innovated by Japan and remains popular both domestically and internationally, with titles like Final Fantasy and Dragon Quest selling millions. In 2018, the country had an estimate of 67.6 million players in its game market.

== Gaming platforms ==
=== Mobile phones ===
Androids and iPhones reportedly had the highest player rate amongst its owners versus the player rate amongst owners of game consoles such as the PlayStation 3 and the Wii. This is most likely due to many Japanese people having daily, long commutes on the train or bus versus time at home and the mobile phone being portable and convenient. The main characteristic of mobiles games is being freemium, and this monetization model is most commonly seen in gacha games. In 2015, mobile game publishers had more than twice the ordinary income rate as console game publishers in Japan.

== Notable genres ==
=== Action games ===
Action games cover a variety of subgenres including:

- Battle royale games
- Beat 'em up
- Fighting games
- Hack and slash
- Maze games
- Platformers
- Rhythm games
- Shooter games
- Side-scrolling video games

=== Gacha games ===
Gacha games are named after toy vending machines in Japan because of its lottery system. After spending in-game currency (which can be bought with real money), the player can get a random character or item. Most often, the characters that the player wants are rare and encourages the player to spend enough money until they get their desired character. Notable Japanese gacha games include iDOLM@STER, Granblue Fantasy, Fate/Grand Order, Umamusume: Pretty Derby and others. Gacha games can often have different game elements such as combat and serve as an RPG or contain rhythm game game-play.

=== Japanese role-playing games ===
Role-playing games (RPGs) originated from tabletop role-playing games (TRPGs) in the West such as Dungeons & Dragons (D&D). In 1985, a Japanese-translated version of D&D was the first TRPG to be published in Japan. TRPGs were not as popular in Japan compared to overseas, but after Enix published Dragon Quest in 1986, RPGs began to gain traction amongst Japanese consumers. Soon after, multiple Japanese publishers were releasing RPG franchises such as Final Fantasy, Persona, Tales, Pokémon, The Legend of Zelda, Ys, Kingdom Hearts, and many others that were very popular with Japanese and overseas consumers.

The term "JRPG" was coined by Western media because Japanese-developed RPGs had distinct elements that set it apart from RPGs developed in the West. The settings in Western RPGs tend to be inspired by fantasy and science-fiction literature while JRPGs have been inspired by anime and manga literature. In addition, Western RPGs tend to be open-world and feature real-time combat systems, but JRPGs favor confining the player to smaller areas in the game world following a linear story line and most notably using turn-based combat systems like in D&D. Although there was typically less freedom in JRPGs compared to Western RPGs, the linear story lines allowed for Japanese developers to completely flesh out the character development of the player's companions and sometimes the player's character themselves. This focus on narrative was different from the West's focus on expression through RPGs and JRPGs appealed to players all over the world because of their rich story lines. However, as of recently, some Japanese developers are starting to try to appeal to a broader audience by introducing real-time combat, for example, such as Final Fantasy XVI.

=== Visual novels ===
Visual novels (VNs) are text-based story video games where players can usually make decisions at multiple points of the story and achieve different endings. VNs are novel-like, but also include character visuals and artwork to complement with different scenes in the story and sometimes voice acting. Many visual don't feature many game-play features besides decision-making. This decision-making differentiated visual novels from regular novels as it allowed players to replay the game at certain decision points to make different decisions and see different endings. Most VNs are romance stories and allow the player to choose between multiple love interests and fall under dating sims. VNs often contained sexual content in the beginning when VNs were first developed for the PC, but when VNs were starting to be published for game consoles as well, family-friendly versions were also released. Like manga, popular VNs were also adapted into anime such as Higurashi: When They Cry, Clannad, Fate/stay night, Steins;Gate, and many others.

Two big subgenres of VNs are bishōjo and otome games. Bishōjo (meaning "beautiful girl" in Japanese) games are romance visual novels featuring a male protagonist with female love interests and are targeted towards straight men, while otome (meaning "maiden" in Japanese) games feature a female protagonist with male love interests catering towards straight women.

== History ==
=== Background ===
In 1966, Sega introduced an electro-mechanical game called Periscope - a submarine simulator which used lights and plastic waves to simulate sinking ships from a submarine. It became an instant success in Japan, Europe, and North America, where it was the first arcade game to cost a quarter per play, which would remain the standard price for arcade games for many years to come.

Sega later produced gun games that used rear image projection in a manner similar to the ancient zoetrope to produce moving animations on a screen. The first of these, the light-gun game Duck Hunt, appeared in 1969; it featured animated moving targets on a screen, printed out the player's score on a ticket, and had volume-controllable sound-effects. Another Sega 1969 release, Missile, a shooter, featured electronic sound and a moving film strip to represent the targets on a projection screen.

=== 1970s to early 1980s ===
The first arcade video game, Atari, Inc.'s Pong, debuted in the United States in 1972, and led to a number of new American manufacturers to create their own arcade games to capitalize on the rising fad. Several of these companies had Japanese partners and kept their overseas counterparts abreast of this new technology, leading several Japanese coin-operated electronic games makers to step into the arcade game market as well. Taito and Namco were some of the early adopters of arcade games in Japan, first distributing American games before developing their own. Nintendo which at this time was primarily manufacturing traditional and electronic toys, also entered the arcade game market in the latter part of the 1970s.

As in the United States, many of the early Japanese arcade games were based on the principle of cloning gameplay established by popular titles to make new ones. However, several new concepts came out of these Japanese-developed games, and performed well in both Japan and in re-licensed versions in the United States, such as Taito's Speed Race and Gun Fight in 1975. Gun Fight notably, when released by Midway Games in the U.S., was the first arcade game to use a microprocessor rather than discrete electronic components. Sega's black and white boxing game Heavyweight Champ was released in 1976 as the first video game to feature fist fighting. The first stealth games were Hiroshi Suzuki's Manbiki Shounen (1979) and Manbiki Shoujo (1980), Taito's Lupin III (1980), and Sega's 005 (1981).

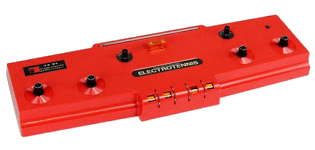
Epoch's TV Tennis Electrotennis, Japan's first home video game console

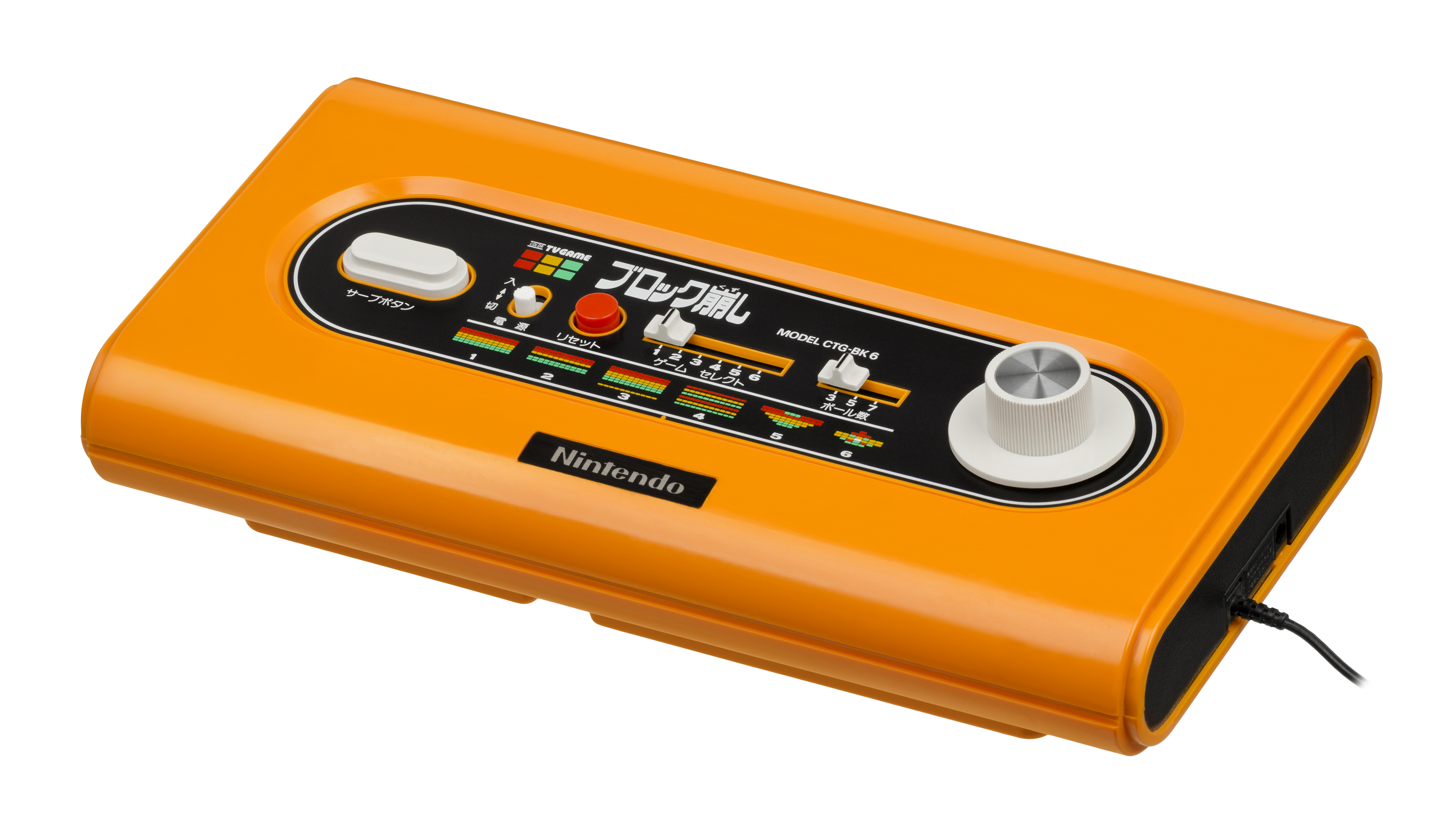
The Color TV-Game Block Kuzushi

Separately, the first home video game console, the Magnavox Odyssey, had been released in the U.S. in 1971, of which Nintendo had partnered to manufacture the light gun accessory for the console, while Atari began releasing home console versions of Pong in 1975. Japan's first home video game console was Epoch's TV Tennis Electrotennis. It was followed by the first successful Japanese console, Nintendo's Color TV-Game, in 1977 which was made in partnership with Mitsubishi Electronics. Numerous other dedicated home consoles were made mostly by television manufacturers, leading these systems to be called TV geemu or terebi geemu in Japan.

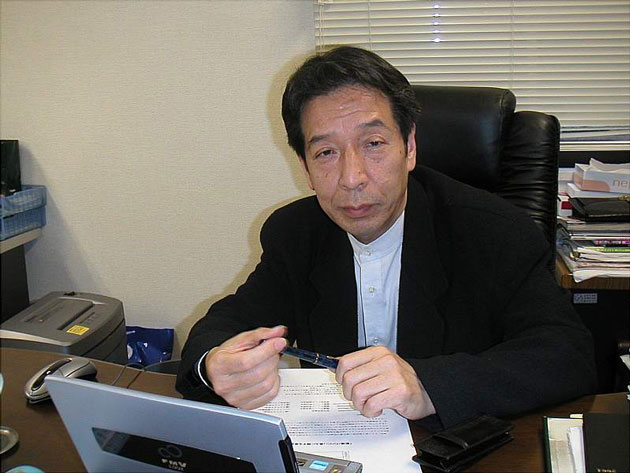
Tomohiro Nishikado, creator of the shooter game Space Invaders

Eventually, the 1978 arcade release of Space Invaders would mark the first major mainstream breakthrough for video games in Japan. Created by Nishikado at Japan's Taito, Space Invaders pitted the player against multiple enemies descending from the top of the screen at a constantly increasing speed. The game used alien creatures inspired by The War of the Worlds (by H. G. Wells) because the developers were unable to render the movement of aircraft; in turn, the aliens replaced human enemies because of moral concerns (regarding the portrayal of killing humans) on the part of Taito. As with subsequent shoot 'em ups of the time, the game was set in space as the available technology only permitted a black background. The game also introduced the idea of giving the player a number of "lives". It popularised a more interactive style of gameplay with the enemies responding to the player-controlled cannon's movement, and it was the first video game to popularise the concept of achieving a high score, being the first to save the player's score. The aliens of Space Invaders return fire at the protagonist, making them the first arcade game targets to do so. It set the template for the shoot 'em up genre, and has influenced most shooting games released since then.

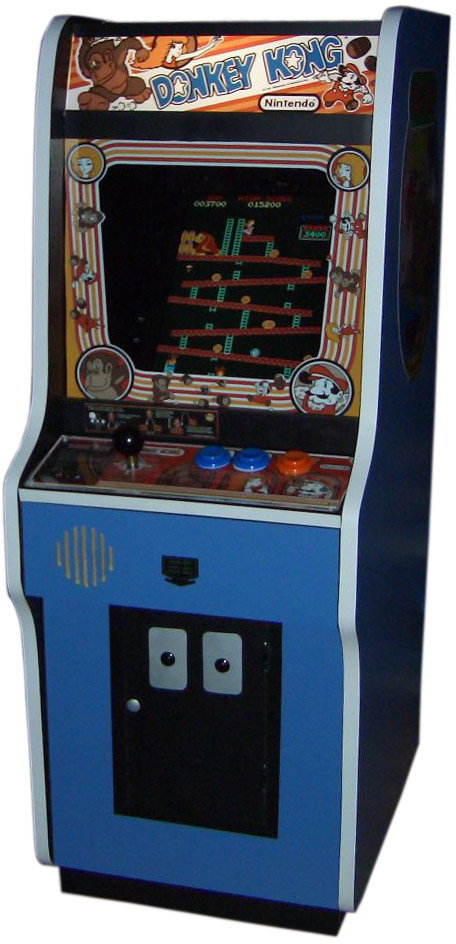
Donkey Kong arcade cabinet

Taito's Space Invaders, in 1978, proved to be the first blockbuster arcade video game. Its success marked the beginning of the golden age of arcade video games. Video game arcades sprang up in shopping malls, and small "corner arcades" appeared in restaurants, grocery stores, bars and movie theaters all over Japan and other countries during the late 1970s and early 1980s. Space Invaders (1978), Galaxian (1979), Pac-Man (1980) and Bosconian (1981) were especially popular. By 1981, the arcade video game industry was worth $8 billion ($28.3 billion in 2025). Some games of this era were so popular that they entered popular culture. The first to do so was Space Invaders. The game was so popular upon its release in 1978 that an urban legend blamed it for a national shortage of 100 yen coins in Japan, leading to a production increase of coins to meet demand for the game (although 100 yen coin production was lower in 1978 and 1979 than in previous or subsequent years, and the claim does not withstand logical scrutiny: arcade operators would have emptied out their machines and taken the money to the bank, thus keeping the coins in circulation). Japanese arcade games during the golden age also had hardware unit sales at least in the tens of thousands, including Ms. Pac-Man with over 115,000 units, Donkey Kong with over 60,000, Galaxian with 40,000, Donkey Kong Jr. with 35,000, and Mr. Do! with 30,000.

Other Japanese arcade games established new concepts that would become fundamentals in video games. Use of color graphics and individualized antagonists were considered "strong evolutionary concepts" among space ship games. The Namco's Galaxian in 1979 introduced multi-colored animated sprites. That same year saw the release of SNK's debut shoot 'em up Ozma Wars, notable for being the first action game to feature a supply of energy, resembling a life bar, a mechanic that has now become common in the majority of modern action games. It also featured vertically scrolling backgrounds and enemies.

=== 1980s ===
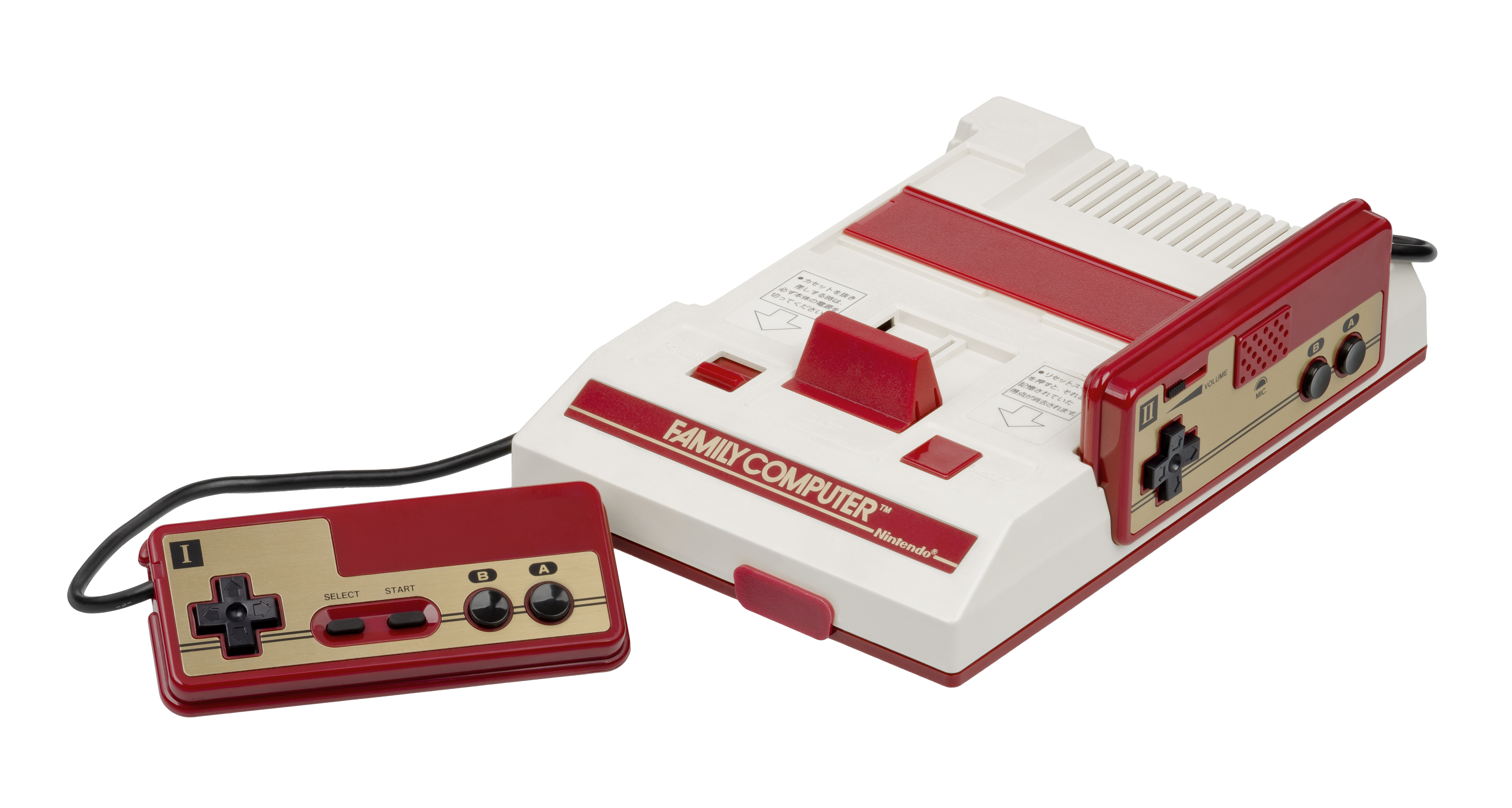
The Family Computer (commonly known by the Japanese-English term Famicom)

From 1980 to 1991, Nintendo produced a line of handheld electronic games called Game & Watch. Created by game designer Gunpei Yokoi, each Game & Watch features a single game to be played on an LCD screen. It was the earliest Nintendo product to gain major success.

Mega Man, known as Rockman (ロックマン, Rokkuman) in Japan, is a Japanese science fiction video game franchise created by Capcom, starring a series of robot characters each known by the moniker "Mega Man". Mega Man, released for the Nintendo Entertainment System in 1987, was the first in a series that expanded to over 50 games on multiple systems. As of March 31, 2021, the game series has sold 36 million units worldwide.[1]

Konami's Scramble, released in 1981, is a side-scrolling shooter with forced scrolling. It was the first scrolling shooter to offer multiple, distinct levels. Vertical scrolling shooters emerged around the same time. Namco's Xevious, released in 1982, is frequently cited as the first vertical scrolling shooter and, although it was in fact preceded by several other games of that type, it is considered one of the most influential.

The first platform game to use scrolling graphics was Jump Bug (1981), a simple platform-shooter game developed by Alpha Denshi.

The North American video game industry was devastated by the 1983 video game crash, but in Japan, it was more of a surprise to developers, and typically known in Japan as the "Atari Shock". After the video game crash, analysts doubted the long-term viability of the video game industry. At the same time, following a series of arcade game successes in the early 1980s, Nintendo made plans to create a cartridge-based console called the Famicom, which is short for Family Computer. Masayuki Uemura designed the system. The console was released on July 15, 1983, as the Family Computer (or Famicom for short) alongside three ports of Nintendo's successful arcade games Donkey Kong, Donkey Kong Jr. and Popeye. The Famicom was slow to gather momentum; a bad chip set caused the initial release of the system to crash. Following a product recall and a reissue with a new motherboard, the Famicom's popularity soared, becoming the best-selling game console in Japan by the end of 1984. By 1988, industry observers stated that the NES's popularity had grown so quickly that the market for Nintendo cartridges was larger than that for all home computer software. By mid-1986, 19% (6.5 million) of Japanese households owned a Famicom; one third by mid-1988. In June 1989, Nintendo of America's vice president of marketing Peter Main, said that the Famicom was present in 37% of Japan's households. By the end of its run, over 60 million NES units had been sold throughout the world. In 1990 Nintendo surpassed Toyota as Japan's most successful corporation.

Because the NES was released after the "video game crash" of the early 1980s, many retailers and adults regarded electronic games as a passing fad, so many believed at first that the NES would soon fade. Before the NES/Famicom, Nintendo was known as a moderately successful Japanese toy and playing card manufacturer, but the popularity of the NES/Famicom helped the company grow into an internationally recognized name almost synonymous with video games as Atari had been, and set the stage for Japanese dominance of the video game industry. With the NES, Nintendo also changed the relationship between console manufacturers and third-party software developers by restricting developers from publishing and distributing software without licensed approval. This led to higher quality software titles, which helped change the attitude of a public that had grown weary from poorly produced titles for earlier game systems. The system's hardware limitations led to design principles that still influence the development of modern video games. Many prominent game franchises originated on the NES, including Nintendo's own Super Mario Bros., The Legend of Zelda and Metroid, Capcom's Mega Man franchise, Konami's Castlevania franchise, Square's Final Fantasy, and Enix's Dragon Quest franchises.

Following the release of the Family Computer / Nintendo Entertainment System, the global video game industry began recovering, with annual sales exceeding $2.3 billion by 1988, with 70% of the market dominated by Nintendo. In 1986 Nintendo president Hiroshi Yamauchi noted that "Atari collapsed because they gave too much freedom to third-party developers and the market was swamped with rubbish games". In response, Nintendo limited the number of titles that third-party developers could release for their system each year, and promoted its "Seal of Quality", which it allowed to be used on games and peripherals by publishers that met Nintendo's quality standards.

Japan's first personal computers for gaming soon appeared, the Sord M200 in 1977 and Sharp MZ-80K in 1978. In Japan, both consoles and computers became major industries, with the console market dominated by Nintendo and the computer market dominated by NEC's PC-88 (1981) and PC-98 (1982). A key difference between Western and Japanese computers at the time was the display resolution, with Japanese systems using a higher resolution of 640x400 to accommodate Japanese text which in turn affected video game design and allowed more detailed graphics. Japanese computers were also using Yamaha's FM synth sound boards from the early 1980s. During the 16-bit era, the PC-98, Sharp X68000 and FM Towns became popular in Japan. The X68000 and FM Towns were capable of producing near arcade-quality hardware sprite graphics and sound quality when they first released in the mid-to-late 1980s.

The Wizardry series (translated by ASCII Entertainment) became popular and influential in Japan, even more so than at home. Japanese developers created the action RPG subgenre in the early 1980s, combining RPG elements with arcade-style action and action-adventure elements. The trend of combining role-playing elements with arcade-style action mechanics was popularized by The Tower of Druaga, an arcade game released by Namco in June 1984. While the RPG elements in Druaga were very subtle, its success in Japan inspired the near-simultaneous development of three early action role-playing games, combining Druaga's real-time hack-and-slash gameplay with stronger RPG mechanics, all released in late 1984: Dragon Slayer, Courageous Perseus, and Hydlide. A rivalry developed between the three games, with Dragon Slayer and Hydlide continuing their rivalry through subsequent sequels. The Tower of Druaga, Dragon Slayer and Hydlide were influential in Japan, where they laid the foundations for the action RPG genre, influencing titles such as Ys and The Legend of Zelda.

The action role-playing game Hydlide (1984) was an early open world game, rewarding exploration in an open world environment. Hydlide influenced The Legend of Zelda (1986), an influential open world game. Zelda had an expansive, coherent open world design, inspiring many games to adopt a similar open world design.

Bokosuka Wars (1983) is considered an early prototype real-time strategy game. TechnoSoft's Herzog (1988) is regarded as a precursor to the real-time strategy genre, being the predecessor to Herzog Zwei and somewhat similar in nature. Herzog Zwei, released for the Sega Mega Drive/Genesis home console in 1989, is the earliest example of a game with a feature set that falls under the contemporary definition of modern real-time strategy.

Data East's Karate Champ from 1984 is credited with establishing and popularizing the one-on-one fighting game genre, and went on to influence Konami's Yie Ar Kung-Fu from 1985. Capcom's Street Fighter (1987) introduced the use of special moves that could only be discovered by experimenting with the game controls. Street Fighter II (1991) established the conventions of the fighting game genre and allowed players to play against each other.

In 1985, Sega AM2's Hang-On, designed by Yu Suzuki and running on the Sega Space Harrier hardware, was the first of Sega's "Super Scaler" arcade system boards that allowed pseudo-3D sprite-scaling at high frame rates. The pseudo-3D sprite/tile scaling was handled in a similar manner to textures in later texture-mapped polygonal 3D games of the 1990s. Designed by Sega AM2's Yu Suzuki, he stated that his "designs were always 3D from the beginning. All the calculations in the system were 3D, even from Hang-On. I calculated the position, scale, and zoom rate in 3D and converted it backwards to 2D. So I was always thinking in 3D." It was controlled using a video game arcade cabinet resembling a motorbike, which the player moves with their body. This began the "Taikan" trend, the use of motion-controlled hydraulic arcade cabinets in many arcade games of the late 1980s, two decades before motion controls became popular on video game consoles.

Sega's Space Harrier, a rail shooter released in 1985, broke new ground graphically and its wide variety of settings across multiple levels gave players more to aim for than high scores. 1985 also saw the release of Konami's Gradius, which gave the player greater control over the choice of weaponry, thus introducing another element of strategy. The game also introduced the need for the player to memorise levels in order to achieve any measure of success. Gradius, with its iconic protagonist, defined the side-scrolling shoot 'em up and spawned a series spanning several sequels. The following year saw the emergence of one of Sega's forefront series with its game Fantasy Zone. The game received acclaim for its surreal graphics and setting and the protagonist, Opa-Opa, was for a time considered Sega's mascot. The game borrowed Defender's device of allowing the player to control the direction of flight and along with the earlier TwinBee (1985), is an early archetype of the "cute 'em up" subgenre.

Hydlide II: Shine of Darkness in 1985 featured an early morality meter, where the player can be aligned with justice, normal, or evil, which is affected by whether the player kills evil monsters, good monsters, or humans, and in turn affects the reactions of the townsfolk towards the player. In the same year, Yuji Horii and his team at Chunsoft began production on Dragon Quest (Dragon Warrior). After Enix published the game in early 1986, it became the template for future console RPGs. Horii's intention behind Dragon Quest was to create a RPG that appeals to a wider audience unfamiliar with the genre or video games in general. This required the creation of a new kind of RPG, that didn't rely on previous D&D experience, didn't require hundreds of hours of rote fighting, and that could appeal to any kind of gamer. The streamlined gameplay of Dragon Quest thus made the game more accessible to a wider audience than previous computer RPGs. The game also placed a greater emphasis on storytelling and emotional involvement, building on Horii's previous work Portopia Serial Murder Case, but this time introducing a coming of age tale for Dragon Quest that audiences could relate to, making use of the RPG level-building gameplay as a way to represent this. It also featured elements still found in most console RPGs, like major quests interwoven with minor subquests, an incremental spell system, the damsel-in-distress storyline that many RPGs follow, and a romance element that remains a staple of the genre, alongside anime-style art by Akira Toriyama and a classical score by Koichi Sugiyama that was considered revolutionary for console video game music. With Dragon Quest becoming widely popular in Japan, such that local municipalities were forced to place restrictions on where and when the game could be sold, the Dragon Quest series is still considered a bellwether for the Japanese video game market.

Shoot 'em ups featuring characters on foot, rather than spacecraft, became popular in the mid-1980s in the wake of action movies such as Rambo: First Blood Part II. The origins of this type go back to Sheriff by Nintendo, released in 1979. Taito's Front Line (1982) established the upwards-scrolling formula later popularized by Capcom's Commando, in 1985, and SNK's Ikari Warriors (1986). Commando also drew comparisons to Rambo and indeed contemporary critics considered military themes and protagonists similar to Rambo or Schwarzenegger prerequisites for a shoot 'em up, as opposed to an action-adventure game. In 1986, Arsys Software released WiBArm, a shooter that switched between a 2D side-scrolling view in outdoor areas to a fully 3D polygonal third-person perspective inside buildings, while bosses were fought in an arena-style 2D battle, with the game featuring a variety of weapons and equipment.

The late 1980s to early 1990s is considered the golden age of Japanese computer gaming, which would flourish until its decline around the mid-1990s, as consoles eventually dominated the Japanese market. A notable Japanese computer RPG from around this time was WiBArm, the earliest known RPG to feature 3D polygonal graphics. It was a 1986 role-playing shooter released by Arsys Software for the PC-88 in Japan and ported to MS-DOS for Western release by Broderbund. In WiBArm, the player controls a transformable mecha robot, switching between a 2D side-scrolling view during outdoor exploration to a fully 3D polygonal third-person perspective inside buildings, while bosses are fought in an arena-style 2D shoot 'em up battle. The game featured a variety of weapons and equipment as well as an automap, and the player could upgrade equipment and earn experience to raise stats. Unlike first-person RPGs at the time that were restricted to 90-degree movements, WiBArm's use of 3D polygons allowed full 360-degree movement.

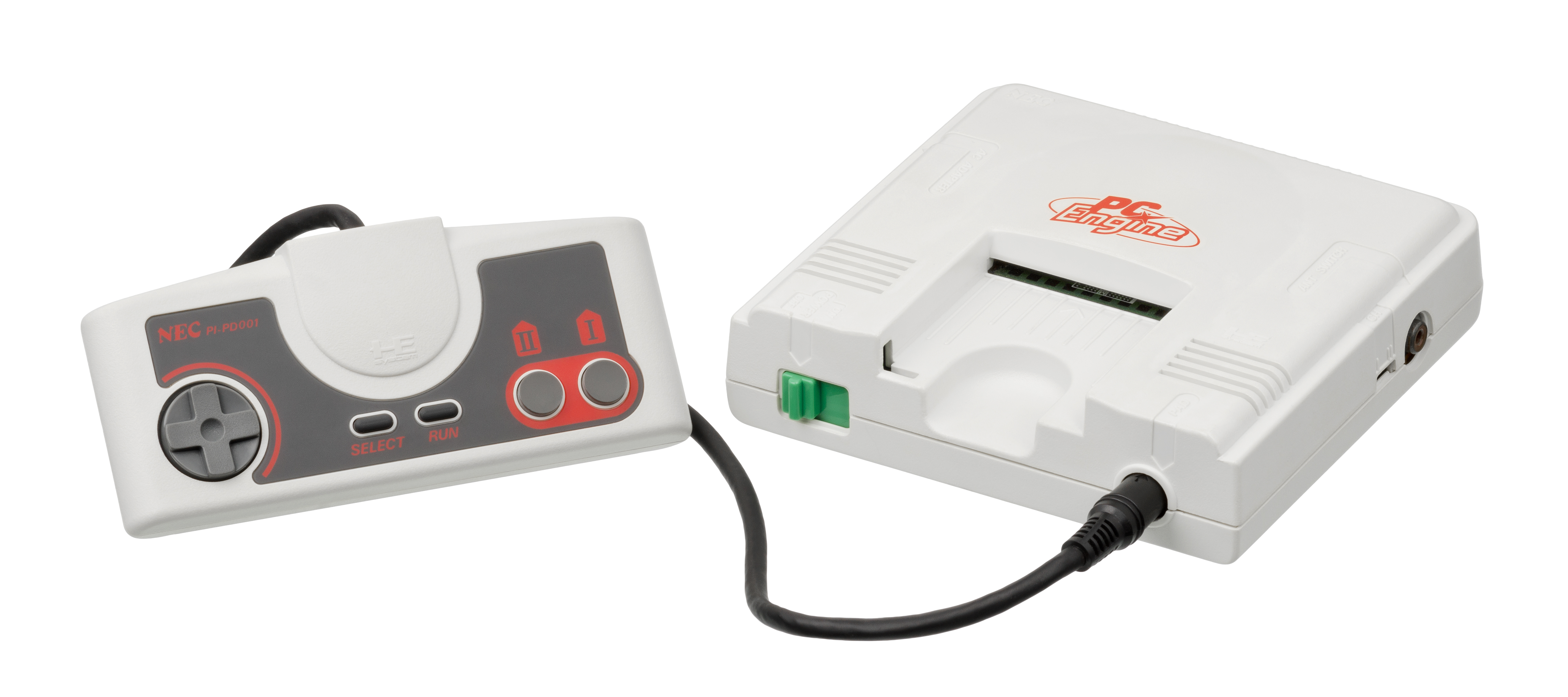
The PC Engine, released in 1987

On October 30, 1987, the PC Engine made its debut in the Japanese market and it was a tremendous success. The console had an elegant, "eye-catching" design, and it was very small compared to its rivals. The PC Engine, TurboGrafx-16, known as TurboGrafx-16 in the rest of the world, was a collaborative effort between Hudson Soft, who created video game software, and NEC, a major company which was dominant in the Japanese personal computer market with their PC-88 and PC-98 platforms.

R-Type, an acclaimed side-scrolling shoot 'em up, was released in 1987 by Irem, employing slower-paced scrolling than usual, with difficult levels calling for methodical strategies. 1990's Raiden was the beginning of another acclaimed and enduring series to emerge from this period. In 1987, Square's 3-D WorldRunner was an early stereoscopic 3-D shooter played from a third-person perspective, followed later that year by its sequel JJ, and the following year by Space Harrier 3-D which used the SegaScope 3-D shutter glasses. Also in 1987, Konami created Contra as a coin-op arcade game that was particularly acclaimed for its multi-directional aiming and two player cooperative gameplay.

Digital Devil Story: Megami Tensei by Atlus for the Nintendo Famicom abandoned the common medieval fantasy setting and sword and sorcery theme in favour of a modern science-fiction setting and horror theme. It also introduced the monster-catching mechanic with its demon-summoning system, which allowed the player to recruit enemies into their party, through a conversation system that gives the player a choice of whether to kill or spare an enemy and allows them to engage any opponent in conversation. Sega's original Phantasy Star for the Master System combined sci-fi & fantasy setting that set it apart from the D&D staple. It was also one of the first games to feature a female protagonist and animated monster encounters, and allowed inter-planetary travel between three planets. Another 1987 title Miracle Warriors: Seal of the Dark Lord was a third-person RPG that featured a wide open world and a mini-map on the corner of the screen.

According to Wizardry developer Roe R. Adams, early action-adventure games "were basically arcade games done in a fantasy setting," citing Castlevania (1986) and Trojan (1986) as examples. IGN UK argues that The Legend of Zelda (1986) "helped to establish a new subgenre of action-adventure", becoming a success due to how it combined elements from different genres to create a compelling hybrid, including exploration, adventure-style inventory puzzles, an action component, a monetary system, and simplified RPG-style level building without the experience points. The Legend of Zelda was the most prolific action-adventure game series through to the 2000s.

The first Nintendo Space World show was held on July 28, 1989. It was a video game trade show that was hosted by Nintendo until 2001. At the same year, Phantasy Star II for the Genesis established many conventions of the RPG genre, including an epic, dramatic, character-driven storyline dealing with serious themes and subject matter, and a strategy-based battle system. The game's science fiction story was also unique, reversing the common alien invasion scenario by instead presenting Earthlings as the invading antagonists rather than the defending protagonists. Capcom's Sweet Home for the NES introduced a modern Japanese horror theme and laid the foundations for the survival horror genre, later serving as the main inspiration for Resident Evil (1996). Tengai Makyo: Ziria released for the PC Engine CD that same year was the first RPG released on CD-ROM and the first in the genre to feature animated cut scenes and voice acting. The game's plot was also unusual for its feudal Japan setting and its emphasis on humour; the plot and characters were inspired by the Japanese folk tale Jiraiya Goketsu Monogatari. The music for the game was also composed by noted musician Ryuichi Sakamoto.

=== 1990s to early 2000s ===
The ‘golden age’ of console RPGs is often dated in the 1990s. Console RPGs distinguished themselves from computer RPGs to a greater degree in the early 1990s. As console RPGs became more heavily story-based than their computer counterparts, one of the major differences that emerged during this time was in the portrayal of the characters, with most American computer RPGs at the time having characters devoid of personality or background as their purpose was to represent avatars which the player uses to interact with the world, in contrast to Japanese console RPGs which depicted pre-defined characters who had distinctive personalities, traits, and relationships, such as Final Fantasy and Lufia, with players assuming the roles of people who cared about each other, fell in love or even had families. Romance in particular was a theme that was common in most console RPGs but alien to most computer RPGs at the time. Japanese console RPGs were also generally more faster-paced and action-adventure-oriented than their American computer counterparts. During the 1990s, console RPGs had become increasingly dominant.

In 1990, Dragon Quest IV introduced a new method of storytelling: segmenting the plot into segregated chapters. The game also introduced an AI system called "Tactics" which allowed the player to modify the strategies used by the allied party members while maintaining full control of the hero. Final Fantasy III introduced the classic "job system", a character progression engine allowing the player to change the character classes, as well as acquire new and advanced classes and combine class abilities, during the course of the game. That same year also saw the release of Nintendo's Fire Emblem: Ankoku Ryu to Hikari no Tsurugi, a game that set the template for the tactical role-playing game genre and was the first entry in the Fire Emblem series. Another notable strategy RPG that year was Koei's Bandit Kings of Ancient China, which was successful in combining the strategy RPG and management simulation genres, building on its own Nobunaga's Ambition series that began in 1983. Several early RPGs set in a post-apocalyptic future were also released that year, including Digital Devil Story: Megami Tensei II, and Crystalis, which was inspired by Hayao Miyazaki's Nausicaa of the Valley of the Wind. Crystalis also made advances to the action role-playing game subgenre, being a true action RPG that combined the real-time action-adventure combat and open world of The Legend of Zelda with the level-building and spell-casting of traditional RPGs like Final Fantasy. That year also saw the release of Phantasy Star III: Generations of Doom, which featured an innovative and original branching storyline, which spans three generations of characters and can be altered depending on which character the protagonist of each generation marries, leading to four possible endings.

In 1991, Final Fantasy IV was one of the first role-playing games to feature a complex, involving plot, placing a much greater emphasis on character development, personal relationships, and dramatic storytelling. It also introduced a new battle system: the "Active Time Battle" system, developed by Hiroyuki Ito, where the time-keeping system does not stop. The fact that enemies can attack or be attacked at any time is credited with injecting urgency and excitement into the combat system. The ATB combat system was considered revolutionary for being a hybrid between turn-based and real-time combat, with its requirement of faster reactions from players appealing to those who were more used to action games.

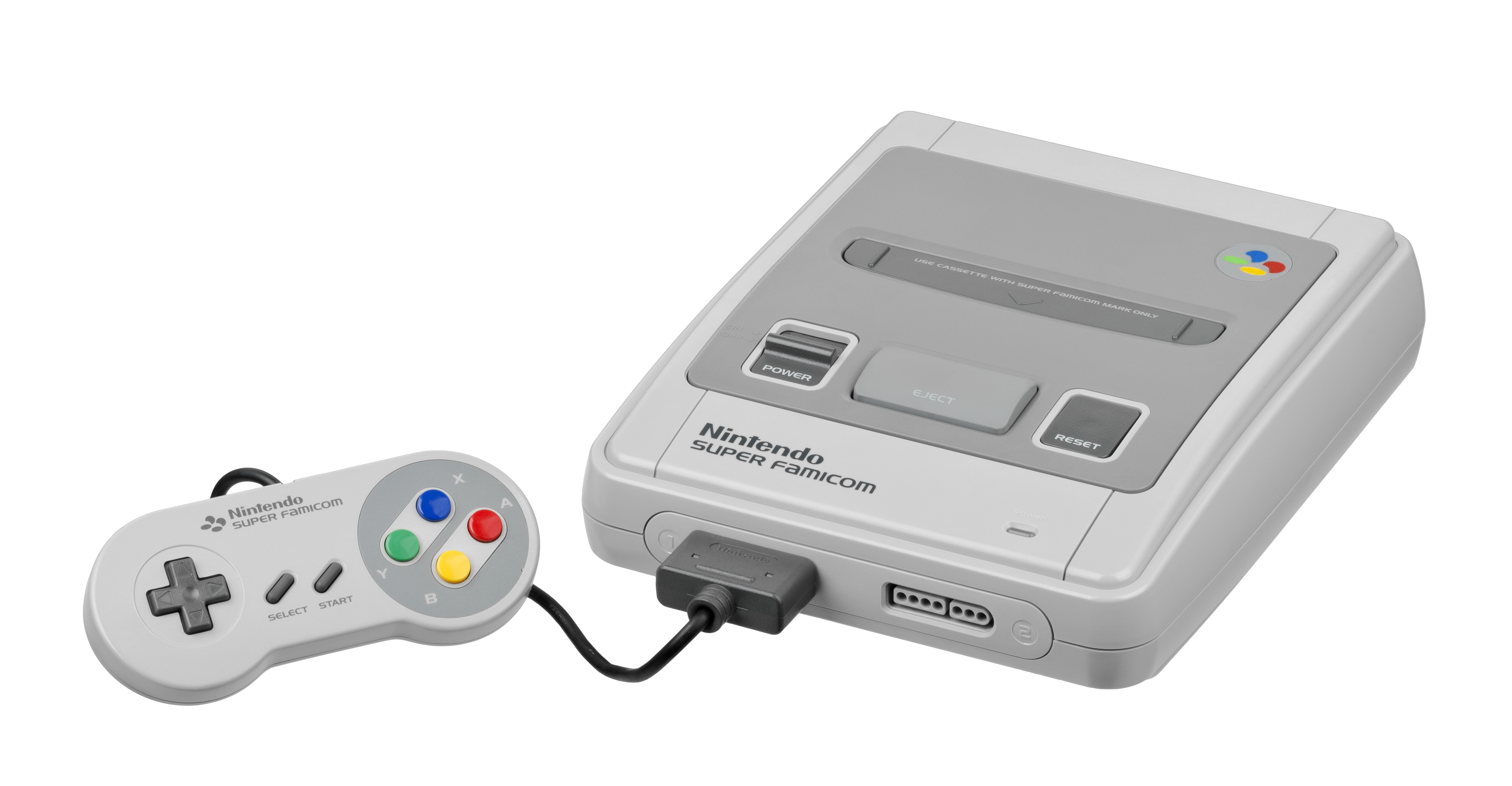
The Super Famicom, released on November 21, 1990

Nintendo executives were initially reluctant to design a new system, but as the market transitioned to the newer hardware, Nintendo saw the erosion of the commanding market share it had built up with the Nintendo Entertainment System. Nintendo's fourth-generation console, the Super Famicom, was released in Japan on November 21, 1990; Nintendo's initial shipment of 300,000 units sold out within hours. Despite stiff competition from the Mega Drive/Genesis console, the Super NES eventually took the top selling position, selling 49.10 million units worldwide, and would remain popular well into the fifth generation of consoles. Nintendo's market position was defined by their machine's increased video and sound capabilities, as well as exclusive first-party franchise titles such as Super Mario World, The Legend of Zelda: A Link to the Past and Super Metroid.

In the early 1990s, the arcades experienced a major resurgence with the 1991 release of Capcom's Street Fighter II, which popularized competitive fighting games and revived the arcade industry to a level of popularity not seen since the days of Pac-Man, setting off a renaissance for the arcade game industry in the early 1990s. Its success led to a wave of other popular games which mostly were in the fighting genre, such as Fatal Fury: King of Fighters (1992) by SNK, Virtua Fighter (1993) by SEGA, and The King of Fighters (1994–2005) by SNK. In 1993, Electronic Games noted that when "historians look back at the world of coin-op during the early 1990s, one of the defining highlights of the video game art form will undoubtedly focus on fighting/martial arts themes" which it described as "the backbone of the industry" at the time.

A new type of shoot 'em up emerged in the early 1990s: variously termed "bullet hell", "manic shooters", "maniac shooters" and danmaku (弾幕; "barrage"), these games required the player to dodge overwhelming numbers of enemy projectiles and called for still more consistent reactions from players. Bullet hell games arose from the need for 2D shoot 'em up developers to compete with the emerging popularity of 3D games: huge numbers of missiles on screen were intended to impress players. Toaplan's Batsugun (1993) provided the prototypical template for this new breed, with Cave (formed by former employees of Toaplan, including Batsugun's main creator Tsuneki Ikeda, after the latter company collapsed) inventing the type proper with 1995's DonPachi. Bullet hell games marked another point where the shoot 'em up genre began to cater to more dedicated players. Games such as Gradius had been more difficult than Space Invaders or Xevious, but bullet hell games were yet more inward-looking and aimed at dedicated fans of the genre looking for greater challenges. While shooter games featuring protagonists on foot largely moved to 3D-based genres, popular, long-running series such as Contra and Metal Slug continued to receive new sequels. Rail shooters have rarely been released in the new millennium, with only Rez and Panzer Dragoon Orta achieving cult recognition.

1992 saw the release of Dragon Quest V, a game that has been praised for its involving, emotional family-themed narrative divided by different periods of time, something that has appeared in very few video games before or since. It has also been credited as the first known video game to feature a playable pregnancy, a concept that has since appeared in later games such as Story of Seasons. Dragon Quest V's monster-collecting mechanic, where monsters can be defeated, captured, added to the party, and gain their own experience levels, also influenced many later franchises such as Pokémon, Digimon and Dokapon. In turn, the concept of collecting everything in a game, in the form of achievements or similar rewards, has since become a common trend in video games. Shin Megami Tensei, released in 1992 for the SNES, introduced an early moral alignment system that influences the direction and outcome of the storyline, leading to different possible paths and multiple endings. This has since become a hallmark of the Megami Tensei series. Another non-linear RPG released that year was Romancing Saga, an open-world RPG by Square that offered many choices and allowed players to complete quests in any order, with the decision of whether or not to participate in any particular quest affecting the outcome of the storyline. The game also allowed players to choose from eight different characters, each with their own stories that start in different places and offer different outcomes. Data East's Heracles no Eikō III, written by Kazushige Nojima, introduced the plot element of a nameless immortal suffering from amnesia, and Nojima would later revisit the amnesia theme in Final Fantasy VII and Glory of Heracles. The TurboGrafx-CD port of Dragon Knight II released that year was also notable for introducing erotic adult content to consoles, though such content had often appeared in Japanese computer RPGs since the early 1980s. That same year, Game Arts began the Lunar series on the Sega CD with Lunar: The Silver Star, one of the first successful CD-ROM RPGs, featuring both voice and text, and considered one of the best RPGs in its time. The game was praised for its soundtrack, emotionally engaging storyline, and strong characterization. It also introduced an early form of level-scaling where the bosses would get stronger depending on the protagonist's level, a mechanic that was later used in Enix's The 7th Saga and extended to normal enemies in Square's Romancing Saga 3 and later Final Fantasy VIII.

3D polygon graphics were popularized by the Sega Model 1 games Virtua Racing (1992) and Virtua Fighter (1993), followed by racing games like the Namco System 22 title Ridge Racer (1993) and Sega Model 2 title Daytona USA, and light gun shooters like Sega's Virtua Cop (1994), gaining considerable popularity in the arcades.

In 1993, Square's Secret of Mana, the second in the Mana series, further advanced the action RPG subgenre with its introduction of cooperative multiplayer into the genre. The game was created by a team previously responsible for the first three Final Fantasy titles: Nasir Gebelli, Koichi Ishii, and Hiromichi Tanaka. The game received considerable acclaim, for its innovative pausable real-time battle system, the "Ring Command" menu system, its innovative cooperative multiplayer gameplay, where the second or third players could drop in and out of the game at any time rather than players having to join the game at the same time, and the customizable AI settings for computer-controlled allies. The game has influenced a number of later action RPGs. That same year also saw the release of Phantasy Star IV: The End of the Millennium, which introduced the use of pre-programmable combat manoeuvers called 'macros', a means of setting up the player's party AI to deliver custom attack combos. That year also saw the release of Romancing Saga 2, which further expanded the non-linear gameplay of its predecessor. While in the original Romancing Saga, scenarios were changed according to dialogue choices during conversations, Romancing Saga 2 further expanded on this by having unique storylines for each character that can change depending on the player's actions, including who is chosen, what is said in conversation, what events have occurred, and who is present in the party. PCGamesN credits Romancing SaGa 2 for having laid the foundations for modern Japanese RPGs with its progressive, non-linear, open world design and subversive themes.

In 1994, Final Fantasy VI moved away from the medieval setting of its predecessors, instead being set in a steampunk environment,. The game received considerable acclaim, and is seen as one of the greatest RPGs of all time, for improvements such as its broadened thematic scope, plotlines, characters, multiple-choice scenarios, and variation of play. Final Fantasy VI dealt with mature themes such as suicide, war crimes, child abandonment, teen pregnancy, and coping with the deaths of loved ones. Square's Live A Live, released for the Super Famicom in Japan, featured eight different characters and stories, with the first seven unfolding in any order the player chooses, as well as four different endings. The game's ninja chapter in particular was an early example of stealth game elements in an RPG, requiring the player to infiltrate a castle, rewarding the player if the entire chapter can be completed without engaging in combat. Other chapters had similar innovations, such as Akira's chapter where the character uses telepathic powers to discover information. Robotrek by Quintet and Ancient was a predecessor to Pokémon in the sense that the protagonist does not himself fight, but sends out his robots to do so. Like Pokémon, Robotrek was designed to appeal to a younger audience, allowed team customization, and each robot was kept in a ball.

FromSoftware released their first video game, titled King's Field, as a launch title for the PlayStation in 1994. The game was later called the brainchild of company founder Naotoshi Zin, who was considered a key creative figure in the series. The eventual success of the first King's Field prompted the development of sequels, establishing the King's Field series. The design of King's Field would influence later titles by FromSoftware including Shadow Tower, Demon's Souls, and the Dark Souls series. The latter would propel FromSoftware to international fame.

In 1995, Square's Romancing Saga 3 featured a storyline that could be told differently from the perspectives of up to eight different characters and introduced a level-scaling system where the enemies get stronger as the characters do, a mechanic that was later used in a number of later RPGs, including Final Fantasy VIII. Sega's Sakura Wars for the Saturn combined tactical RPG combat with dating sim and visual novel elements, introducing a real-time branching choice system where, during an event or conversation, the player must choose an action or dialogue choice within a time limit, or not to respond at all within that time; the player's choice, or lack thereof, affects the player character's relationship with other characters and in turn the characters' performance in battle, the direction of the storyline, and the ending. Later games in the series added several variations, including an action gauge that can be raised up or down depending on the situation, and a gauge that the player can manipulate using the analog stick depending on the situation. The success of Sakura Wars led to a wave of games that combine the RPG and dating sim genres, including Thousand Arms in 1998, Riviera: The Promised Land in 2002, and Luminous Arc in 2007.

The survival horror video game genre began with Capcom's Resident Evil (1996), which coined the term "survival horror" and defined the genre. The game was inspired by Capcom's Sweet Home (1989), retroactively described as survival horror.

The first Tokyo Game Show was held in 1996. From 1996 to 2002, the show was held twice a year: once in the Spring and once in Autumn (in the Tokyo Big Sight). Since 2002, the show has been held once a year. It attracts more visitors every year. 2011's show hosted over 200,000 attendees and the 2012 show bringing in 223,753. The busiest TGS was in 2016 with 271,224 people in attendance and 614 companies had exhibits. The event has been held annually since 1996 and was never canceled. The 20th anniversary of TGS was celebrated in 2016.

The Fujitsu FM Towns Marty is considered the world's first 32-bit console (predating the Amiga CD32 and 3DO), being only released in Japan on February 20, 1993, by Fujitsu. However, it failed to make an impact in the marketplace due to its expense relative to other consoles and inability to compete with home computers. Around the mid-1990s, the fifth-generation home consoles, Sega Saturn, PlayStation, and Nintendo 64, began offering true 3D graphics, improved sound, and better 2D graphics, than the previous generation. By 1995, personal computers followed, with 3D accelerator cards. While arcade systems such as the Sega Model 3 remained considerably more advanced than home systems in the late 1990s.

The next major revolution came in the mid-to-late 1990s, which saw the rise of 3D computer graphics and optical discs in fifth generation consoles. The implications for RPGs were enormous—longer, more involved quests, better audio, and full-motion video. This was clearly demonstrated in 1997 by the phenomenal success of Final Fantasy VII, which is considered one of the most influential games of all time, akin to that of Star Wars in the movie industry. With a record-breaking production budget of around $45 million, the ambitious scope of Final Fantasy VII raised the possibilities for the genre, with its more expansive world to explore, much longer quest, more numerous sidequests, dozens of minigames, and much higher production values. The latter includes innovations such as the use of 3D characters on pre-rendered backgrounds, battles viewed from multiple different angles rather than a single angle, and for the first time full-motion CGI video seamlessly blended into the gameplay, effectively integrated throughout the game. Gameplay innovations included the materia system, which allowed a considerable amount of customization and flexibility through materia that can be combined in many different ways and exchanged between characters at any time, and the limit breaks, special attacks that can be performed after a character's limit meter fills up by taking hits from opponents. Final Fantasy VII continues to be listed among the best games of all time, for its highly polished gameplay, high playability, lavish production, well-developed characters, intricate storyline, and an emotionally engaging narrative that is much darker and sophisticated than most other RPGs. The game's storytelling and character development was considered a major narrative jump forward for video games and was often compared to films and novels at the time.

One of the earliest Japanese RPGs, Koei's The Dragon and Princess (1982), featured a tactical turn-based combat system. Koji Sumii's Bokosuka Wars, originally released for the Sharp X1 computer in 1983 and later ported to the NES in 1985, is credited for laying the foundations for the tactical RPG genre, or "simulation RPG" genre as it is known in Japan, with its blend of basic RPG and strategy game elements. The genre became with the game that set the template for tactical RPGs, Fire Emblem: Ankoku Ryū to Hikari no Tsurugi (1990).

Treasure's shoot 'em up, Radiant Silvergun (1998), introduced an element of narrative to the genre. It was critically acclaimed for its refined design, though it was not released outside Japan and remains a much sought after collector's item. Its successor Ikaruga (2001) featured improved graphics and was again acclaimed as one of the best games in the genre. Both Radiant Silvergun and Ikaruga were later released on Xbox Live Arcade. The Touhou Project series spans 22 years and 27 games as of 2018 and was listed in the Guinness World Records in October 2010 for being the "most prolific fan-made shooter series". The genre has undergone something of a resurgence with the release of the Xbox 360, PlayStation 3 and Wii online services, while in Japan arcade shoot 'em ups retain a deep-rooted niche popularity. Geometry Wars: Retro Evolved was released on Xbox Live Arcade in 2005 and in particular stood out from the various re-releases and casual games available on the service. The PC has also seen its share of dōjin shoot 'em ups like Crimzon Clover, Jamestown: Legend of the Lost Colony, Xenoslaive Overdrive, and the eXceed series. However, despite the genre's continued appeal to an enthusiastic niche of players, shoot 'em up developers are increasingly embattled financially by the power of home consoles and their attendant genres.

=== 2005–2015 ===
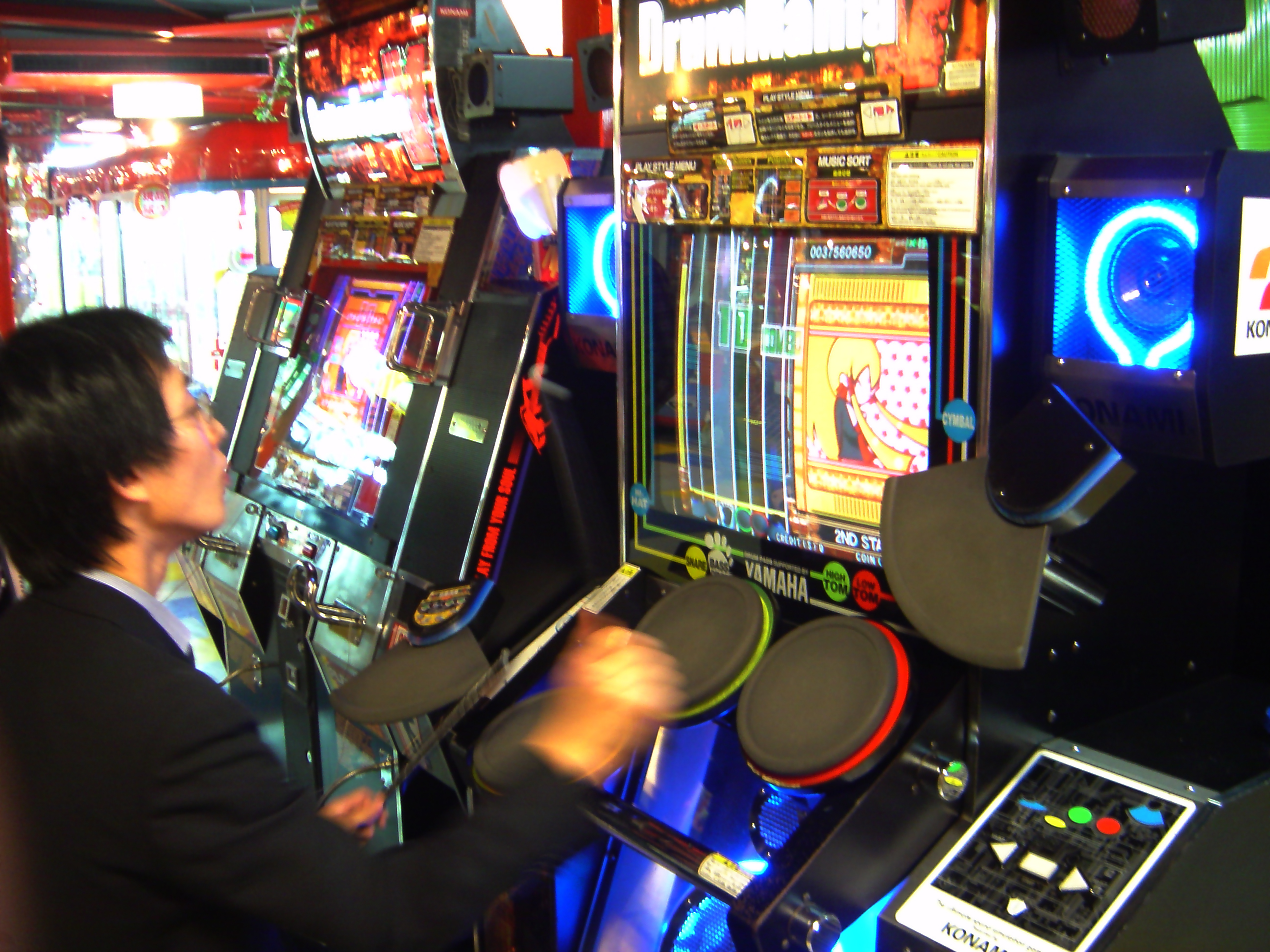
A man playing a drumming arcade game (Drummania) in Tsukuba, Ibaraki, 2005

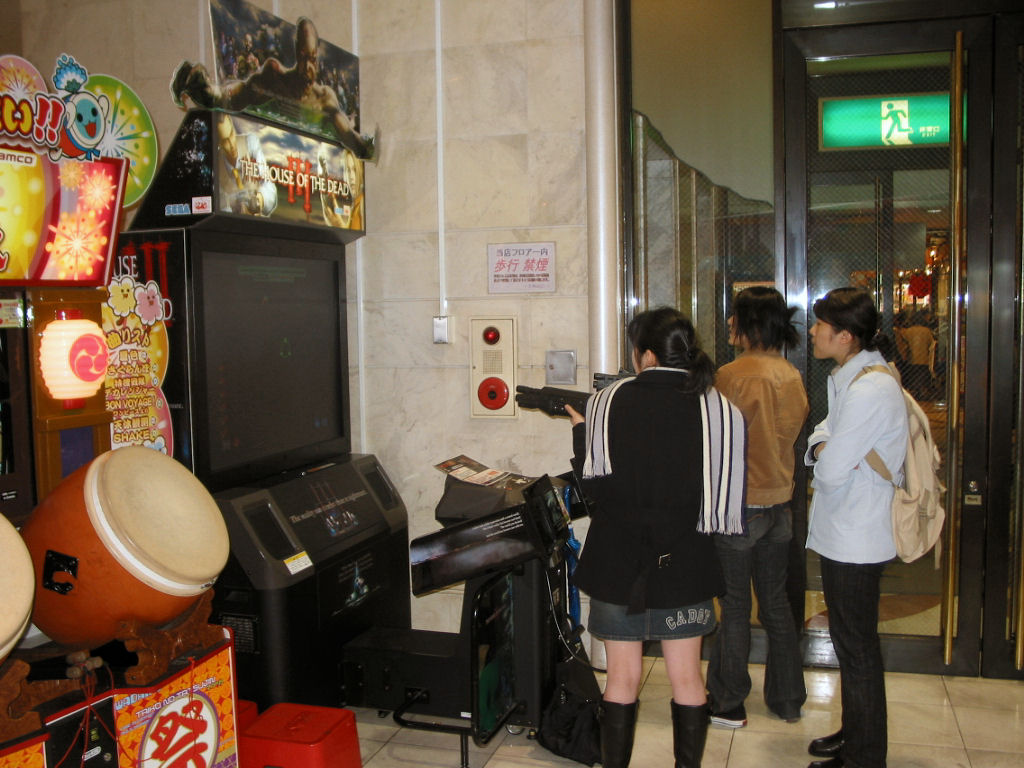
Girls playing The House of the Dead III in an amusement arcade in Japan, 2005

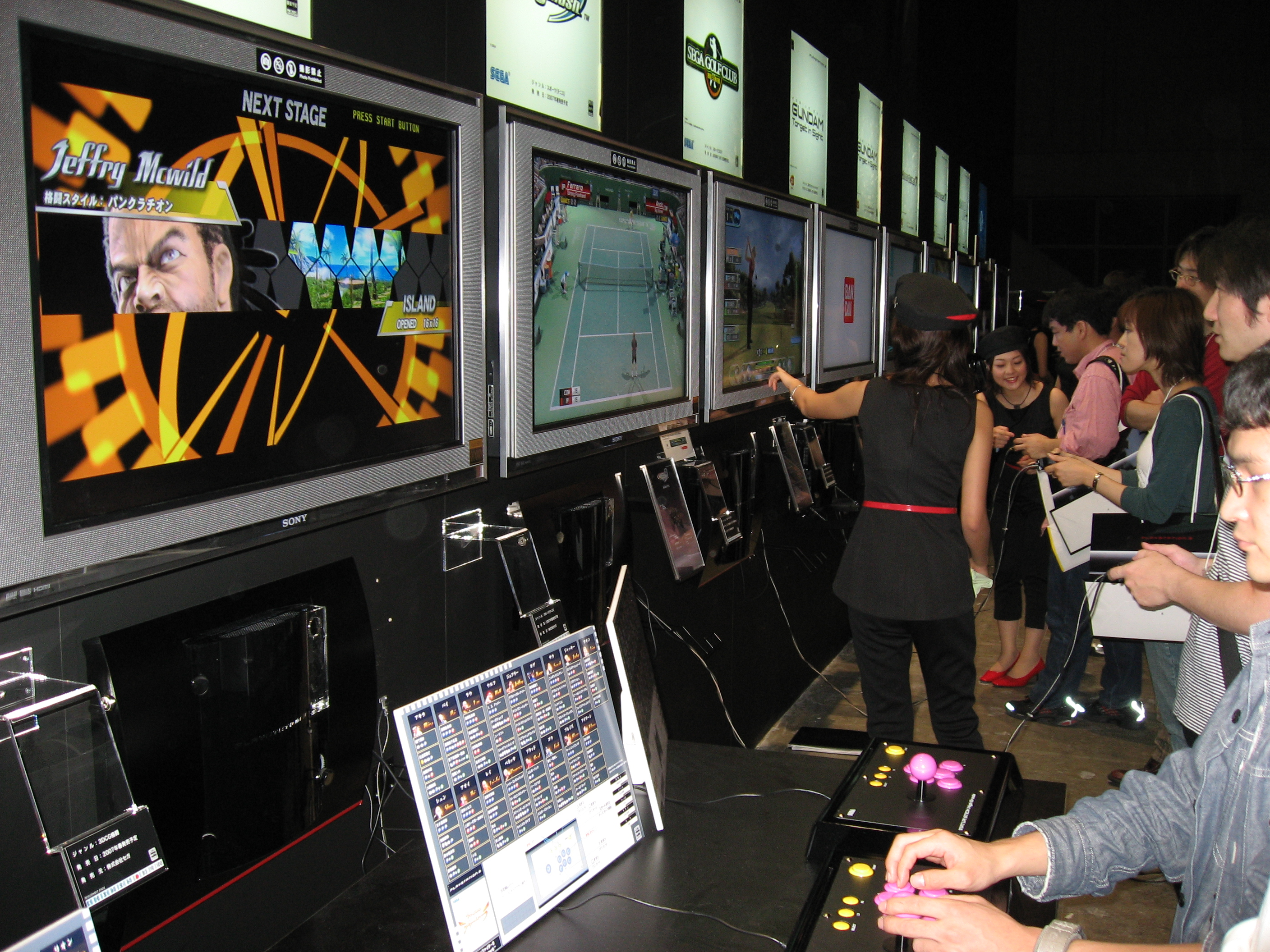
PlayStation 3 at Tokyo Game Show 2006

In 2002, the Japanese video game industry made up about 50% of the global market; that share has since shrunk to around 10% by 2010. The shrinkage in market share has been attributed to a difference of taste between Japanese and Western audiences, and the country's economic recession.

Nintendo had seen record revenues, net sales and profits in 2009 as a result of the release of the Nintendo DS and Wii in 2004 and 2006, respectively, but in Nintendo's subsequent years, its revenues had declined.

In 2009, FromSoftware released Demon's Souls for the PlayStation 3, which brought them international exposure. Its spiritual successor, Dark Souls, was released in 2011. In March 2014, Dark Souls II, was released, while Dark Souls III was released in 2016. Other FromSoftware games inspired by the Dark Souls series, Bloodborne (2015) and Elden Ring (2022), received critical acclaim and strong sales. They have also received a number of awards, primarily those for the role-playing genre, including multiple "RPG of the Year" and Game of the Year awards. Since release, Dark Souls and Bloodborne have been cited by many publications to be among the greatest games of all time.

The decline of the Japanese video game development industry during this period was partially attributed to the traditional development process. Japanese companies were criticized for long development times and slow release dates on home video game consoles, their lack of third-party game engines, and for being too insular to appeal to a global market. Yoichi Wada stated in 2009 that the Japanese game industry had become "almost xenophobic." He also stated: "The lag with the US is very clear. The US games industry was not good in the past but it has now attracted people from the computer industry and from Hollywood, which has led to strong growth." At the 2010 Tokyo Game Show, Keiji Inafune stated that "Everyone's making awful games - Japan is at least five years behind", and that "Japan is isolated in the gaming world. If something doesn't change, we're doomed.", stressing the need for Japanese developers to bring in Western approaches to game development to make a comeback.

Related to the isolationism, games developed in Western countries did not perform well in Japan, whereas Japanese games were readily played by Western market consumers. Foreign games often sell more poorly in Japanese markets due to differences in what consumers expect for escapism between these cultures. Microsoft had attempted to push both the Xbox and Xbox 360 consoles in Japan with poor success, at they struggled to compete against Sony and Nintendo there.

However, as detailed above, Japanese console games became less successful, even in their own country, as of 2013.

In the Japanese gaming industry, arcades have remained popular through to the present day. As of 2009, out of Japan's $20 billion gaming market, $6 billion of that amount is generated from arcades, which represent the largest sector of the Japanese video game market, followed by home console games and mobile games at $3.5 billion and $2 billion, respectively. In 2005, arcade ownership and operation accounted for a majority of Namco's for example. With considerable withdrawal from the arcade market from companies such as Capcom, Sega became the strongest player in the arcade market with 60% marketshare in 2006. Despite the global decline of arcades, Japanese companies hit record revenue for three consecutive years during this period. However, due to the country's economic recession, the Japanese arcade industry has also been steadily declining, from ¥702.9 billion (US$8.7 billion) in 2007 to ¥504.3 billion ($6.2 billion) in 2010. In 2013, estimation of revenue is ¥470 billion.

In the 2010s, Japanese RPGs have been experiencing a resurgence on PC, with a significant increase in the number of Japanese RPGs releasing for the Steam platform. This began with the 2010 release of doujin/indie game Recettear (2007) for Steam, selling over 500,000 units on the platform. This led to many Japanese doujin/indie games releasing on Steam in subsequent years.

Beyond doujin/indie titles, 2012 was a breakthrough year, with the debut of Nihon Falcom's Ys series on Steam and then the Steam release of From Software's Dark Souls, which sold millions on the platform. Other Japanese RPGs were subsequently ported to Steam, such as the previously niche Valkyria Chronicles which became a million-seller on the platform, and other titles that sold hundreds of thousands on Steam, such as the 2014 localization of The Legend of Heroes: Trails in the Sky (2014) and ports of numerous Final Fantasy titles. Japanese developers have been increasingly considering Steam as a viable platform for the genre, with many Japanese RPGs available on the platform.

By 2015, Japan had become the world's fourth largest PC game market, behind only China, the United States, and South Korea. The Japanese game development engine RPG Maker has also gained significant popularity on Steam, including hundreds of commercial games. Every year, hundreds of games released on Steam are created using RPG Maker, as of 2017.

In the present day, Japan is the world's largest market for mobile games. The Japanese market today is becoming increasingly dominated by mobile games, which generated $5.1 billion in 2013, more than traditional console games in the country.

Former rivals in the Japanese arcade industry, Konami, Taito, Bandai Namco Entertainment and Sega, are now working together to keep the arcade industry running.

=== 2016–present ===
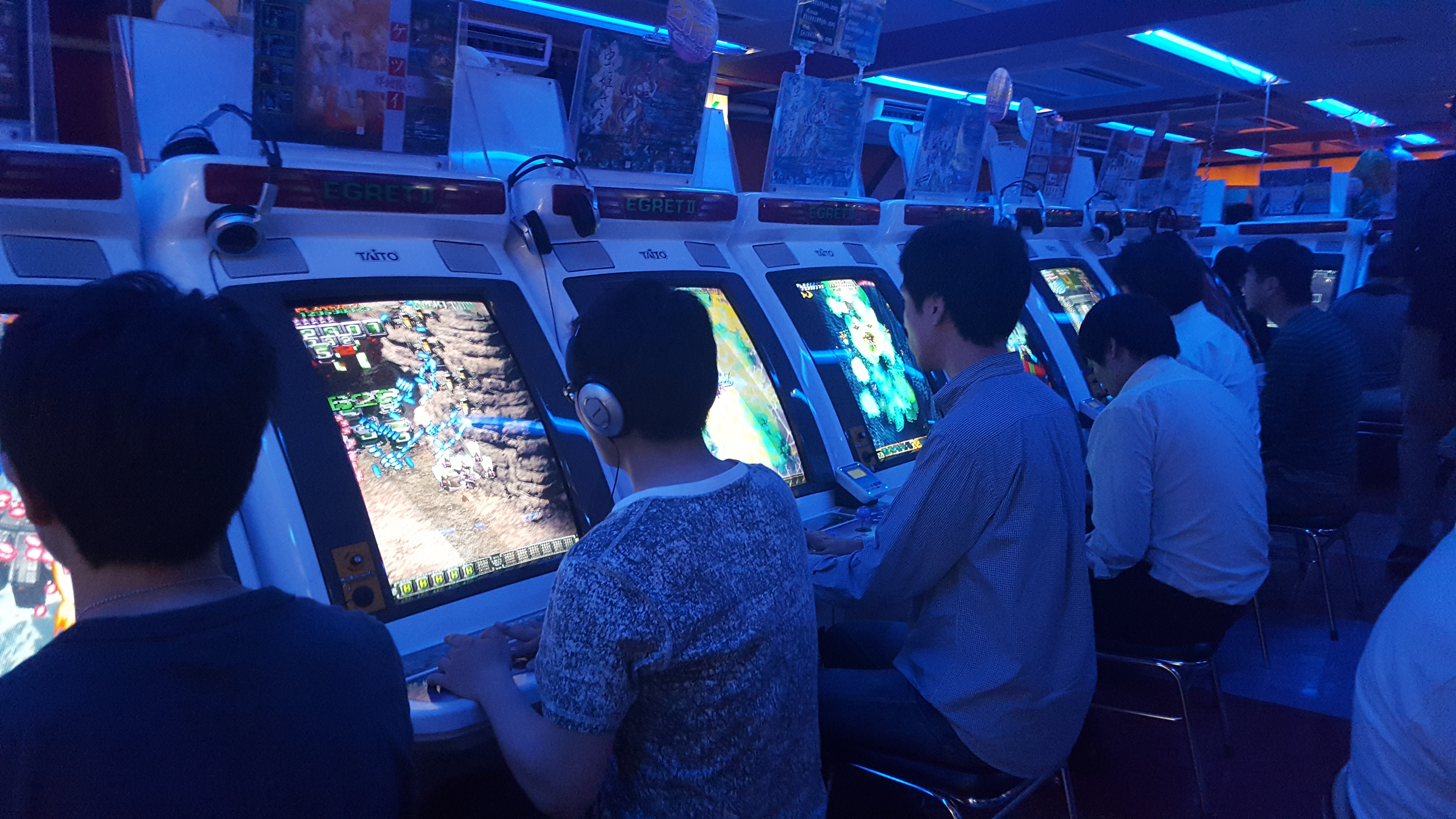
Japanese players at a shoot 'em up arcade in Akihabara, Tokyo (2017)

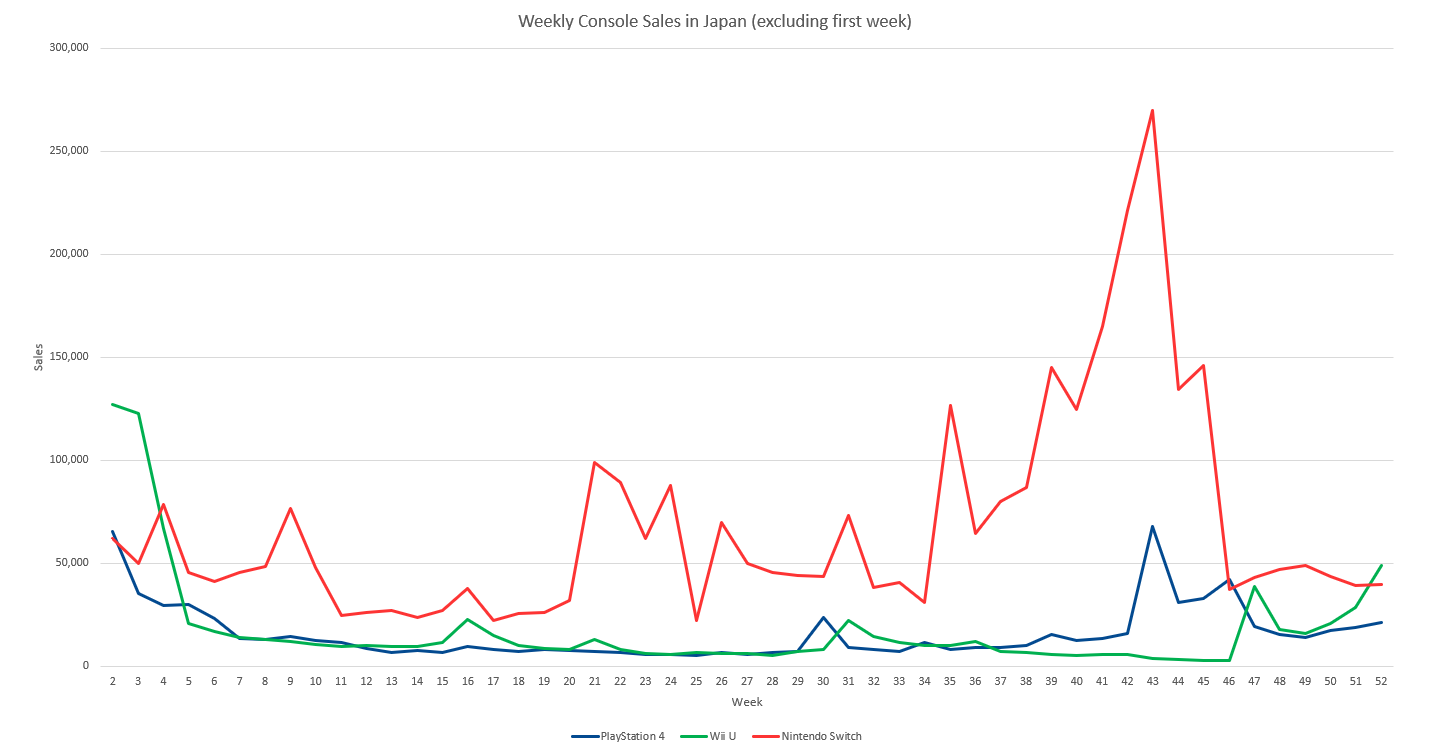
A line graph depicting the first-year sales of the Nintendo Switch (red), Wii U (green), and PlayStation 4 (blue) in Japan

The eighth generation of video game consoles primarily includes the home video game consoles of the Wii U released in 2012, the PlayStation 4 family in 2013; the handheld game consoles of the Nintendo 3DS in 2011, Nintendo 2DS in 2013, and the PlayStation Vita in 2011; as well as the first hybrid game console, the Nintendo Switch in 2017, which played as a handheld but could be docked to played like a home console. Unlike in most prior generations, there were few new innovative hardware capabilities to mark this generation as distinct from prior ones. Sony continued to produce new systems with similar designs and capabilities as their predecessors, but with improved performance (processing speed, higher-resolution graphics, and increased storage capacity) that further moved consoles into confluence with personal computers, and furthering support for digital distribution and games as a service. Motion-controlled games of the seventh generation had waned in popularity, but consoles were preparing for advancement of virtual reality (VR); Sony introduced the PlayStation VR in 2016.

Though prior console generations have normally occurred in five to six-year cycles, the transition from seventh to eighth generation lasted approximately eight years. The transition is also unusual in that the prior generation's best-selling unit, the Wii, was the first to be replaced in the eighth generation. In 2011, Sony considered themselves only halfway through a ten-year lifecycle for their seventh-generation offerings. Nintendo president Satoru Iwata had stated that his company would be releasing the Wii U due to declining sales of seventh generation home consoles and that "the market is now waiting for a new proposal for home consoles". Sony considered making its next console a digital download only machine, but decided against it due to concerns about the inconsistency of internet speeds available globally, especially in developing countries.

On September 13, 2012, Nintendo announced that the Wii U would launch in Japan on December 8, 2012. The PlayStation 4 and Wii U use AMD GPUs, and the PS4 also use AMD CPUs on an x86-64 architecture, similar to common personal computers (as opposed to the IBM PowerPC Architecture used in the previous generation). Nintendo and Sony were not aware that they were all using AMD hardware until their consoles were announced. This shift was considered to be beneficial for multi-platform development, due to the increased similarities between PC hardware and console hardware.

In October 2013, online retailer Play.com announced that its Wii U sales saw a 75% sales increase. The company also predicted that the Wii U would be more popular than its competition, the PlayStation 4 and Xbox One, among children during the holiday season. Following the release of Wii Party U on October 31 in Japan, weekly Wii U sales spiked to 38,802 units sold. During the first two weeks of December, the Wii U was the top performing home console in Japan, with 123,665 units sold. In fiscal year (FY) 2013 (ending early 2013), Nintendo sold 23.7 million consoles. By February 26, 2014, Wii U sales had surpassed those of the Xbox 360 in Japan. However, by June 2015, the basic Wii U was discontinued in Japan, and replaced by a 32 GB "Premium" set that includes white hardware and a Wii Remote Plus. In mid-November 2016, Nintendo announced that Japanese production of the Wii U would be ending "in the near future".

The PS4 was released in Japan at ¥39,980 on February 22, 2014. In September 2015, Sony reduced the price of the PS4 in Japan to ¥34,980, with similar price drops in other Southeast Asian markets. Within the first two days of release in Japan during the weekend of February 22, 2014, 322,083 consoles were sold. PS4 software unit sales surpassed 20.5 million on April 13, 2014. During Japan's 2013 fiscal year, heightened demand for the PS4 helped Sony top global console sales, beating Nintendo for the first time in eight years.

Since 2016, Japanese video games have been experiencing a resurgence, as part of a renaissance for the Japanese video game industry. In 2017, Japanese video games gained further commercial success and greater critical acclaim. In 2016, the global success of Pokémon Go helped Pokémon Sun and Moon set sales records around the world. Final Fantasy XV was also a major success, selling millions. There were also other Japanese RPGs that earned commercial success and/or critical acclaim that year, including Dragon Quest VII: Fragments of the Forgotten Past, Shin Megami Tensei IV: Apocalypse, Bravely Second, Fire Emblem Fates, Dragon Quest Builders, World of Final Fantasy, Exist Archive: The Other Side of the Sky and I Am Setsuna.

Anticipating the release of the console's successor, the Nintendo Switch, a hybrid video game console, Nintendo had planned to diminish production of the Wii U. It formally announced the end of its production on January 31, 2017. The company had posted its first loss as a video game company in 2012 prior to the Wii U's introduction that year, and had similar losses in the following years due to the console's poor uptake. The New York Times attributed Nintendo lowering financial forecasts in 2014 to weak hardware sales against mobile gaming. Previously, the company had been hesitant about this market, with then-president Satoru Iwata considering that they would "cease to be Nintendo" and lose their identity if they attempted to enter it. About three years prior to the Switch's announcement, Iwata, Tatsumi Kimishima, Genyo Takeda, and Shigeru Miyamoto crafted a strategy for revitalizing Nintendo's business model, which included approaching the mobile market, creating new hardware, and "maximizing [their] intellectual property". Prior to his death, Iwata was able to secure a business alliance with Japanese mobile provider DeNA to develop mobile titles based on Nintendo's first-party franchises, believing this approach would not compromise their integrity. Following Iwata's death in July 2015, Kimishima was named as president of Nintendo, while Miyamoto was promoted to the title of "Creative Fellow".

The Switch was officially released on March 3, 2017, in Japan with an MSRP of ¥29,980. The design of the Switch was aimed to bridge the polarization of the gaming market at the time, creating a device that could play "leisurely" video games along with games that are aimed to be played "deeply", according to Shinya Takahashi and Yoshiaki Koizumi, general manager and deputy general manager of Nintendo's Entertainment Planning & Development Division (EPD), respectively. This approach also would apply to the cultural lifestyle and gaming differences between Japanese and Western players; Japanese players tend to play on the go and with social groups, while Western players tend to play at home by themselves. The design of the Switch would meet both cultures, and certain games, like 1-2-Switch, could potentially make social gaming more acceptable in Western culture. Two key elements that were set to address this mixed market were the ability for the unit to play both on a television screen and as a portable, and the use of detachable controllers. In Japan, first weekend sales exceeded 330,000 units, which was on par with the PlayStation 4 during its launch period. Media Create estimated that more than 500,000 Switch units were sold in Japan within its first month, beating out the PlayStation 4 to this figure.

Console sales in Japan, which had been languishing due to the strength of the mobile game market, saw its first annual growth of 14.8% in 2017 due to the release of the Switch. Based on its first year sales, the Switch was considered to be the fastest-selling game console in history in many regions. With 2017 year end Japanese sales data from Media Create, the Switch became the fastest-selling home console in Japan in first year sales, with its total sales of 3.2 million units exceeding the 3.0 million units of the PlayStation 2 during its first year of release, while Famitsu reported that these sales had eclipsed the lifetime sales of the Wii U in the country, and helped to support the first growth in sales within Japan's console market in eleven years. By May 2019, the Switch had overtaken the PS4's lifetime sales in Japan.

In 2017, Japanese RPGs gained further commercial success and greater critical acclaim. The year started strong with Gravity Rush 2, followed by Yakuza 0, which some critics consider the best in the Yakuza series, Nioh which is considered to have one of the eighth-generation's best RPG combat systems, and then Nier Automata which has gameplay and storytelling thought to be some of the best in recent years. Persona 5 won the Best Role Playing Game award at The Game Awards 2017. Some Japanese RPGs that were previously considered niche became mainstream million-sellers in 2017, including Persona 5, Nier: Automata, Nioh, and Xenoblade Chronicles 2 on the Nintendo Switch. 2017 was considered a strong year for Japanese RPGs, with other notable releases including Dragon Quest VIII on the Nintendo 3DS, Tales of Berseria, Valkyria Revolution, Ever Oasis, Final Fantasy XII: The Zodiac Age, Ys VIII, Etrian Odyssey V, Dragon Quest Heroes II, The Legend of Heroes: Trails in the Sky the 3rd, Fire Emblem Echoes: Shadows of Valentia, Final Fantasy XIV: Stormblood, and Tokyo Xanadu. In 2018, Monster Hunter: World sold over 10 million units, becoming Capcom's best-selling single software title, and Square Enix's Octopath Traveler sold over 1 million units. In 2019, From Software's Sekiro: Shadows Die Twice received universal acclaim. On release day, Sekiro drew over 108,000 concurrent players on Steam, the highest for a new game launched during January–March 2019 and the third highest of any Japanese game in the platform's history, behind only Monster Hunter: World and Dark Souls III. The game won the Game of the Year award at The Game Awards 2019 and by fans in the 2019 Steam Awards.

Sony released the PlayStation 5 in 2020 and have emphasized that they want this to be a soft transition, allowing PlayStation 4 games to be directly backwards compatible on their respective systems. Sony has stated the "overwhelming majority" of PlayStation 4 games will play on the PlayStation 5, with many running at higher frame rates and resolutions.

Since the 2020s Japanese game studios have also begun to increasingly capitalize on the global popularity of anime and manga by releasing a larger number of anime-styled video games.

In 2022, From Software's Elden Ring received universal acclaim. The title made the third-most-popular debut on the video-sharing platforms Twitch history, drawing nearly 900,000 viewers within 24 hours of release and won "Game of the Year" award at The Game Awards 2022.

In 2023 Japan's PC game market reached a record value of $1.61 billion increasing nearly 2.87 times since 2019. PC accounted for 13% of Japan's total video game revenue — compared to just 5% in 2019. The number of new Steam users from Japan had increased by more than 150% since 2019.

== See also ==
- Japanese popular culture
- Soft power § Japan
  - Cool Japan

Locations

- Joypolis
- Sega World
- Warehouse Kawasaki
