= Nightmare Kart =

2024 racing video game

- Developer: LWMedia
- Publisher: LWMedia
- Composer: Evelyn Lark
- Platform: Microsoft Windows
- Release: Itch.io; May 31, 2024; Steam; June 5, 2024
- Genre: Racing
- Mode: Single-player

Nightmare Kart is a 2024 kart racing game developed and published by Lilith 'b0tster' Walther and Corwyn Prichard under the company name LWMedia. The game uses a low poly art style inspired by the original PlayStation.

== Gameplay ==
Nightmare Kart takes place in the Victorian steampunk city of Miralodia, with heavy inspirations taken from Bloodborne.

The game contains various game modes, such as a full campaign, boss fights, and a VS battle mode. Players can choose from 13 karts and 15 maps. Players can perform driving techniques such as drifting and jump-tricks in order to build up a boost, they can also pick up power-ups to fight against other racers.

== Development and release ==
Nightmare Kart initially started out as an April Fool's video created during the development of Bloodborne PSX but was eventually turned into a real product shortly after the game's release.

During January 2024, LWMedia was contacted by Sony over unauthorized use of the Bloodborne intellectual property, which caused the game to be slightly delayed in order to remove all references. This also caused the game to be renamed from Bloodborne Kart to Nightmare Kart.

The game was released on May 31, 2024, on Itch.io and June 5, 2024, on Steam, with the Steam release being delayed due to Steam's review process.

On 14 November 2025, a reskin of Nightmare Kart, titled Glitch Kart, was released in cooperation with Glitch Productions to help advertise their Black Friday sale. It features environments and characters from various Glitch Production shows, such as The Amazing Digital Circus and Murder Drones.

== Reception ==
Nightmare Kart received generally positive reviews, with reviewers praising the game's unique retro artstyle and relatively large size for a project made by an indie developer. However, there were issues about the game's AI being poorly balanced on some races.
