= Bloodborne PSX =

2022 video game

- Developer: LWMedia
- Publisher: LWMedia
- Designers: b0tster; Corwyn Prichard
- Composer: Evelyn Lark
- Platform: Windows
- Release: January 31, 2022
- Genre: Action role-playing
- Mode: Single-player

Bloodborne PSX (Note: Sometimes written as BloodbornePSX) is a 2022 action role-playing game published by LWMedia as a demake of FromSoftware's Bloodborne. The game was developed by Lilith 'b0tster' Walther and Corwyn Prichard. It uses a low poly artstyle heavily inspired by the original PlayStation. (Note: The PlayStation used the internal codename PSX) The game was later removed from download after receiving a copyright takedown notice from Sony in 2025.

== Development and release ==
Bloodborne PSX was inspired by mockup screenshots of a Bloodborne demake that Walther viewed around 2015. The game was developed in a total of 13 months, with Walther pausing development in order to finish her other game Arcus.

== Gameplay ==
Bloodborne PSX takes place within the city of Yharnam with players able to follow the first section of Bloodborne up to the fight against the enemy Father Gascoigne. The player takes the role of the Hunter who awakes within the city of Yharnam and following the same plot as Bloodborne.

The original control scheme of Bloodborne was reworked to emulate being played on a PS1 controller, notably controlling character movement with a D-pad and implementing an enemy lock on system to adapt to the lack of analog sticks.

== Reception ==
Bloodborne PSX received generally positive reviews, with reviewers praising the game's unique retro artstyle and faithful recreations of the source media in both game play and art style.

The game proved very popular, with 100,000 downloads within the first day of release on itch.io. Some attributed this large popularity to the lack of a Bloodborne port on the PC.

== See also ==
- Nightmare Kart, a kart racing spin-off by the same team
