= Wenheyou =

Restaurant chain in China

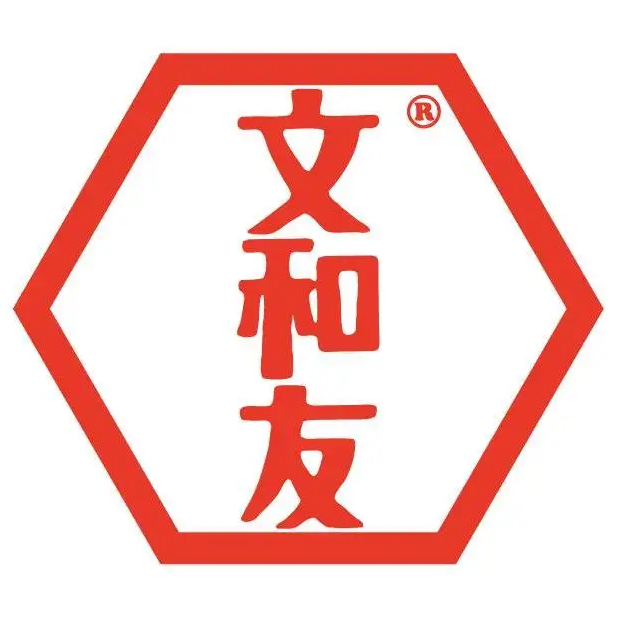
Wenheyou logo

Wenheyou (Chinese: 文和友; pinyin: Wénhéyǒu) is a restaurant brand based in Changsha, Hunan province, China. Established in 2011, the brand is notable for its multi-story 80s-themed restaurant spaces in Changsha and Shenzhen that have been likened to the former Kowloon Walled City in Hong Kong.

== Origins ==
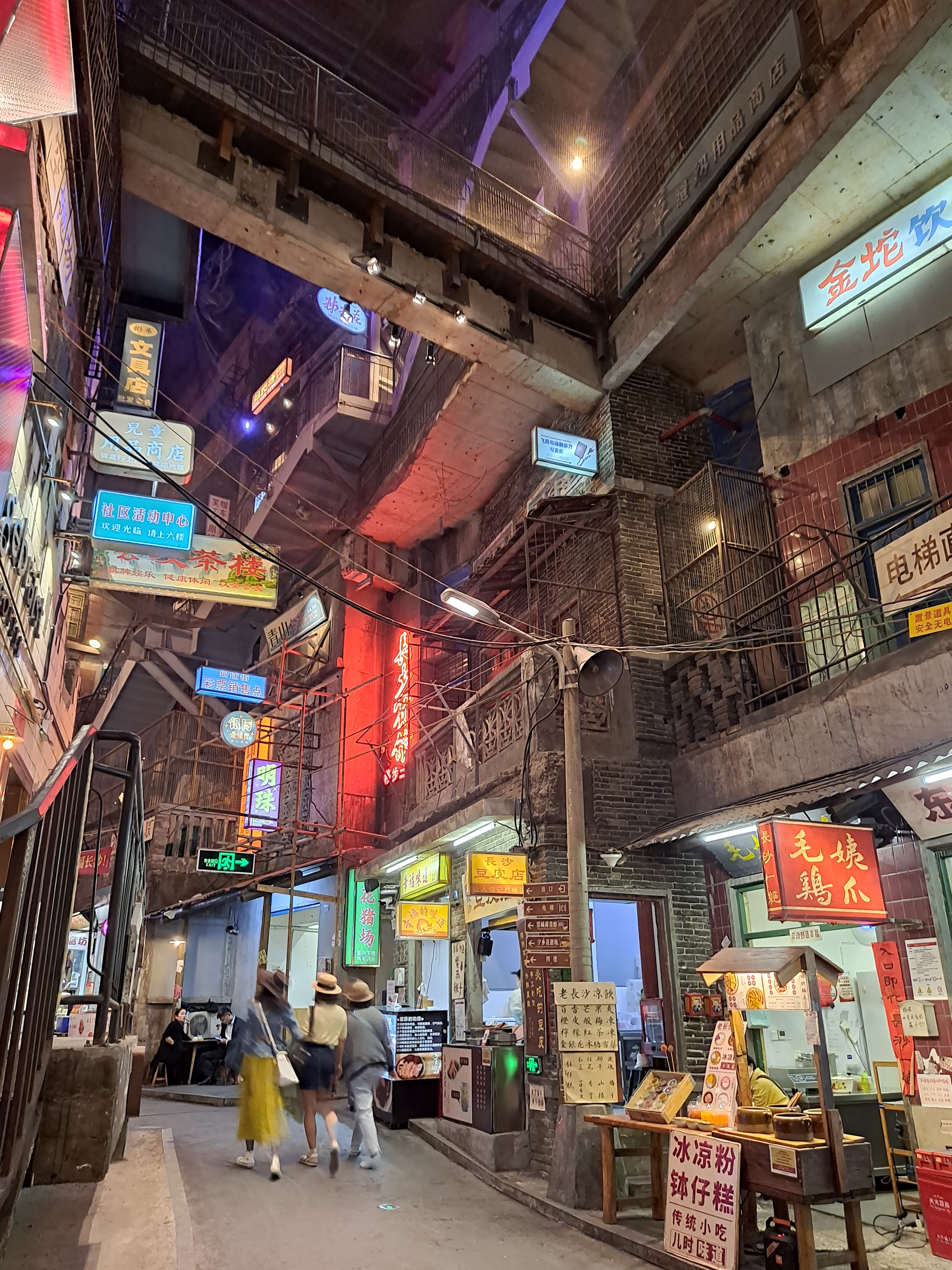
Changsha Wenheyou

Wenheyou ("Wen and Friends") was founded by the Changsha street food vendor Wen Bin (文宾) in 2011 with only ¥5000 in seed money. He paid particular attention to branding, and in a year he was able to make a name for his brand that he was able to move into a 10 m^{2} shop that became featured in the popular talk show Day Day Up on Hunan Television. With the media exposure, Wenheyou tapped into the influencer (wanghong) economy and expanded in the city of Changsha with its offerings of local delicacies like crayfish, sausages, and stinky tofu in the following years.

In 2017, faced with redevelopment of the Du Fu River Pavilion area where their flagship store was located, Wenheyou rebranded itself as a cultural entity in order to move into the upscale Changsha Hisense Plaza nearby. It was there that Wenheyou established the "Super Wenheyou" (超级文和友) brand in 2018, creating immersive multi-story open dining spaces that evoke the atmosphere of Chinese cities in the 1980s. From there on, Wen Bin envisioned Wenheyou as the "Disney of the Chinese food industry".

== Expansion ==
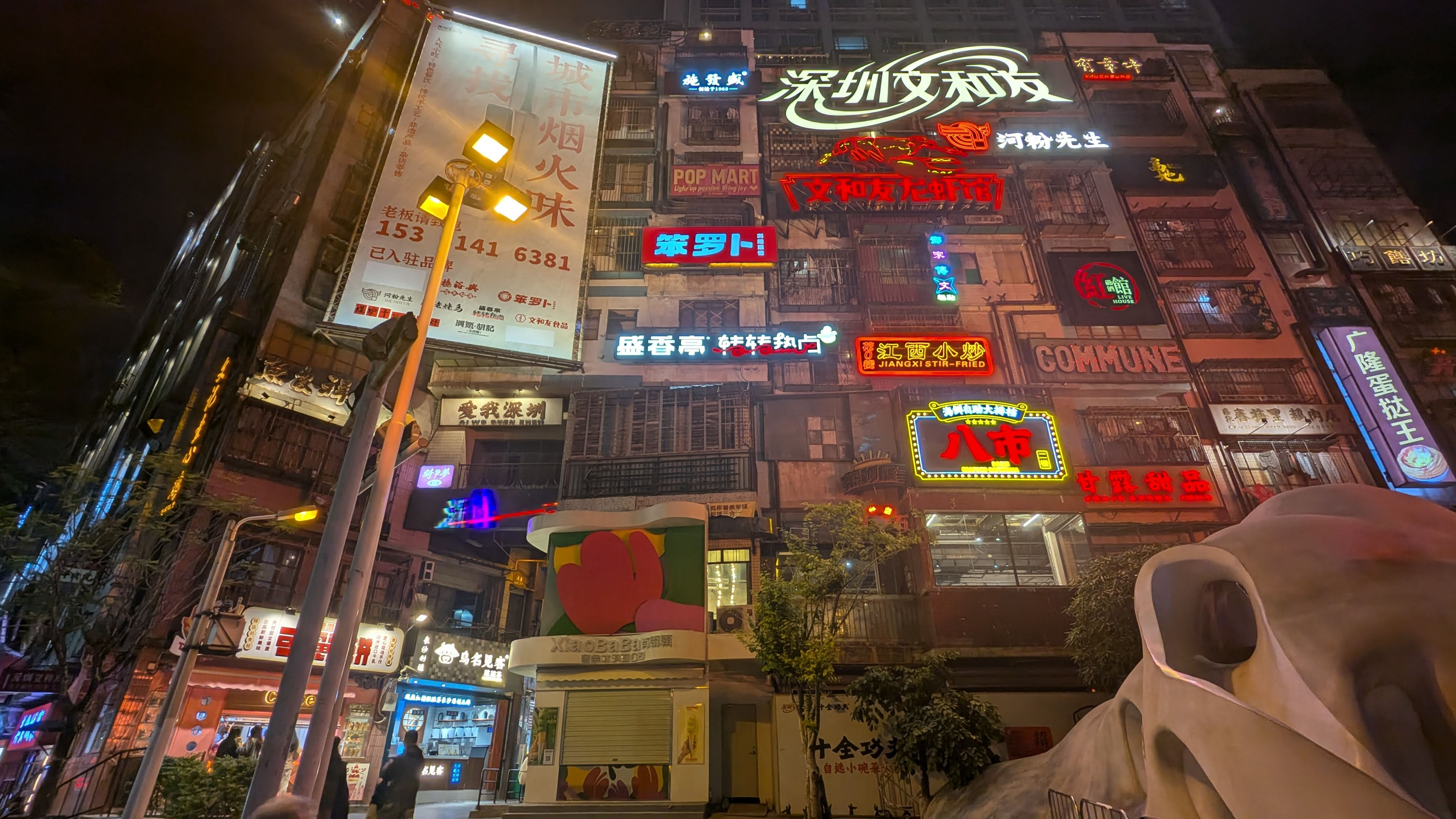
Shenzhen Wenheyou

In July 2020, the Guangzhou Super Wenheyou opened in Taikoo Hui Guangzhou, marking the first Wenheyou branch outside of Changsha. The restaurant initially focused on crayfish and featured over 20 traditional Guangzhou xiaochi snack shops. The opening attracted a large number of customers, with wait times reaching up to four and a half hours. In April 2021, the Shenzhen Wenheyou opened in the Dongmen commercial area, with a focus on Shenzhen oysters. At the same time, the Super Wenheyou locations in Changsha and Guangzhou were renamed to Changsha Wenheyou (长沙文和友) and Guangzhou Wenheyou (广州文和友).

However, Wenheyou faced difficulties adapting to the local markets in Guangzhou and Shenzhen. The initial excitement and long queues experienced during the opening did not last, and customer traffic decreased. Many shops also withdrew from the locations. The Shenzhen Wenheyou changed its branding within six months to "Old Street Oyster Market" (老街蚝市场), and a few months later, it underwent another rebranding. The Guangzhou Wenheyou abandoned its focus on crayfish and shifted to an increased emphasis on seafood. Additionally, in 2022, it was reported that Wenheyou laid off staff, and plans for expansion into Nanjing were put on hold.

In September 2023, the Shenzhen Wenheyou temporarily closed, sparking rumors of its closure. It later reopened, but with a transformation focusing on Hunan cuisine, hoping to revive its popularity. In July 2024, Taikoo Hui, the owner of the Guangzhou Wenheyou location, announced plans to make changes to the building's exterior, including the construction of a pedestrian bridge. This led to speculation that Wenheyou would be leaving the location, but the company denied these rumors. However, by December 2024, all other brand stores within the Guangzhou Wenheyou site had closed. In February 2025, Chinese media reported that Taikoo Hui had terminated Wenheyou's lease contract early and Guangzhou Wenheyou had closed.

== See also ==
- Warehouse Kawasaki
