= Yharnam =

Fictional city

- Bloodborne location
- The concept art of Yharnam
- First appearance: Bloodborne (2015)
- Genre: Soulsborne

In-universe information
- Type: City
- Ruled by: Healing Church
- Locations: Old Yharnam, Central Yharnam, Cathedral Ward, Upper Cathedral Ward

Yharnam (pronounced as /ˈjɑːr.nəm/, YAR-nəm) is a fictional city and the primary setting of Bloodborne, a 2015 video game developed by FromSoftware. Heavily featuring Gothic Revival architecture, the city is governed and eventually destroyed by an organization known as the Healing Church. The Church, which discovered miraculous, occult blood in ancient catacombs beneath the city that could cure any illness, triggered a massive influx of people into Yharnam. This sparked rampant xenophobia among the native Yharnamite population, resenting and mocking "outsiders". However, the use of the ancient blood had more severe unintended consequences, as it began to indiscriminately transform those who possessed it into beasts, a plague that the Church attempts to suppress. Despite this, a phenomenon known as the Blood Moon brings about the city's downfall. When the player encounters Yharnam, most of its surviving inhabitants are either in hiding or already becoming beasts. Yharnam was praised by critics for its architectural and level design, as well as the exploration of classic Lovecraftian tropes in its lore and characters.

== Design and setting ==
The bulk of the city is laid out vertically, with the newer areas of the city having been built atop older areas. At the lowest level is Old Yharnam, a vestige of the city's past that was later burned and abandoned due to an outbreak of the Plague of Beasts. Above it lies Central Yharnam, its main population center, and the Cathedral Ward, the headquarters of the Healing Church. Alongside it exists Yahar'gul, the Unseen Village, run by the School of Mensis. At the highest levels of the city is the Upper Cathedral Ward, an area controlled by the Choir, a secretive branch of the Healing Church that seeks to contact the Great Ones, otherworldly alien entities worshipped like gods.

A twisted, dream-like version of Yharnam also exists called the Hunter's Nightmare. Due to a curse placed upon them by inhabitants of a fishing hamlet they pillaged, Hunters are sent there "when drunk with blood" to eternally hunt beasts. The citizens of Yharnam are said to drink blood for recreational purposes as well as curative ones, with blood being more popular than alcohol.

=== The Healing Church ===
The primary social institution in Yharnam is the Healing Church, which is also the source of blood ministration. It is described as "a medical and spiritual practice that involves consuming special blood to heal illnesses and grow closer to the Healing Church's gods". Founded by a group of academic elites, the actual religiosity of the organization is dubious, with scientific research taking precedent over spiritual worship. Despite the heavy use of Christian imagery in Yharnam's architecture, the Healing Church is contrasted from Christianity by its worship of "indifferent, malformed aliens" rather than "the image of a loving, personal God become man". This ultimately leads them to madness, as well as a "vast theological failure".

== Development ==
The architecture of Yharnam is described as "pre-industrial European", and "a spiny bed of super-imposed structures". Representing "humanity's collapse despite (or due to) its ambitions", the architecture of the city is Mannerist in style, with "bizarrely manipulated traditional elements".

== Reception ==
Julie Muncy of The A.V. Club praised the level design of Yharnam, stating that "If Bloodborne deserves to be remembered for anything, it's the meticulously crafted geography of its first half. Those opening hours take players on a journey through some of FromSoftware's best designed levels, beginning in the intricate Victorian hellscape of Central Yharnam before winding up toward the Grand Cathedral at the city center and beyond to the wooded frontiers outside the city gates."

Gareth Damian Martin of Kill Screen states that, with regards to Yharnam, "none of Miyazaki's other worlds — not the districts of Boletaria nor the peaks and troughs of Lordran — have ever felt so disgustingly real." Calling it "a nightmare vision of old Europe, with its bridges and spires, squares and alleys", he adds that "there is a distinctive atmosphere that is carried through each area with a sense of restraint and an unflinching eye for detail." Ario Barzan of the same publication calls Yharnam's architecture a "fractured mountain of anomalies", stating that "the architecture as a collective entity clamors for space, so eager to become something absolute and grand that it threatens to collapse into nonsense". He adds that "as spires are piled onto innumerable balustrades, arches, and buttresses, Yharnam reaches a plane of feverish obsession that echoes the cosmic communion this civilization pursued to its ruin."

Duy Le of The Spinoff states that the details of Yharnam's setting show the game's "active subversion and subtle indictment of Lovecraft's bigotry". Saying that a typical Lovecraft story features "a distinguished, Anglo-Saxon protagonist" discovering "unspeakable horror [...] usually wrought by the simple, the ignorant, or the foreign", he contrasts the fact that the player is an outsider in a city styled after London, while "the only friendly NPCs in the first area of the game — Gilbert and Eileen — speak with a Scottish and Irish accent respectively", showing their status as foreigners as well. He also states that "it is revealed that Byrgenwerth, an elite educational institute (modeled on Lovecraft's own Miskatonic University), and the Healing Church, an ideological offshoot [...] are the culprits behind the spread of the scourge", calling it another subversion of a Lovecraft trope, "the sycophantic worship of institution and heritage." Jeffrey Matulef of Eurogamer called Yharnam's "worship of terrifying otherworldly gods" a reversal of the Lovecraftian concept that "isolated, backwoods people" are most susceptible to superstition.
