= Warehouse Kawasaki =

Amusement facility in Japan

Coordinates: 35.5269°N 139.6940°E

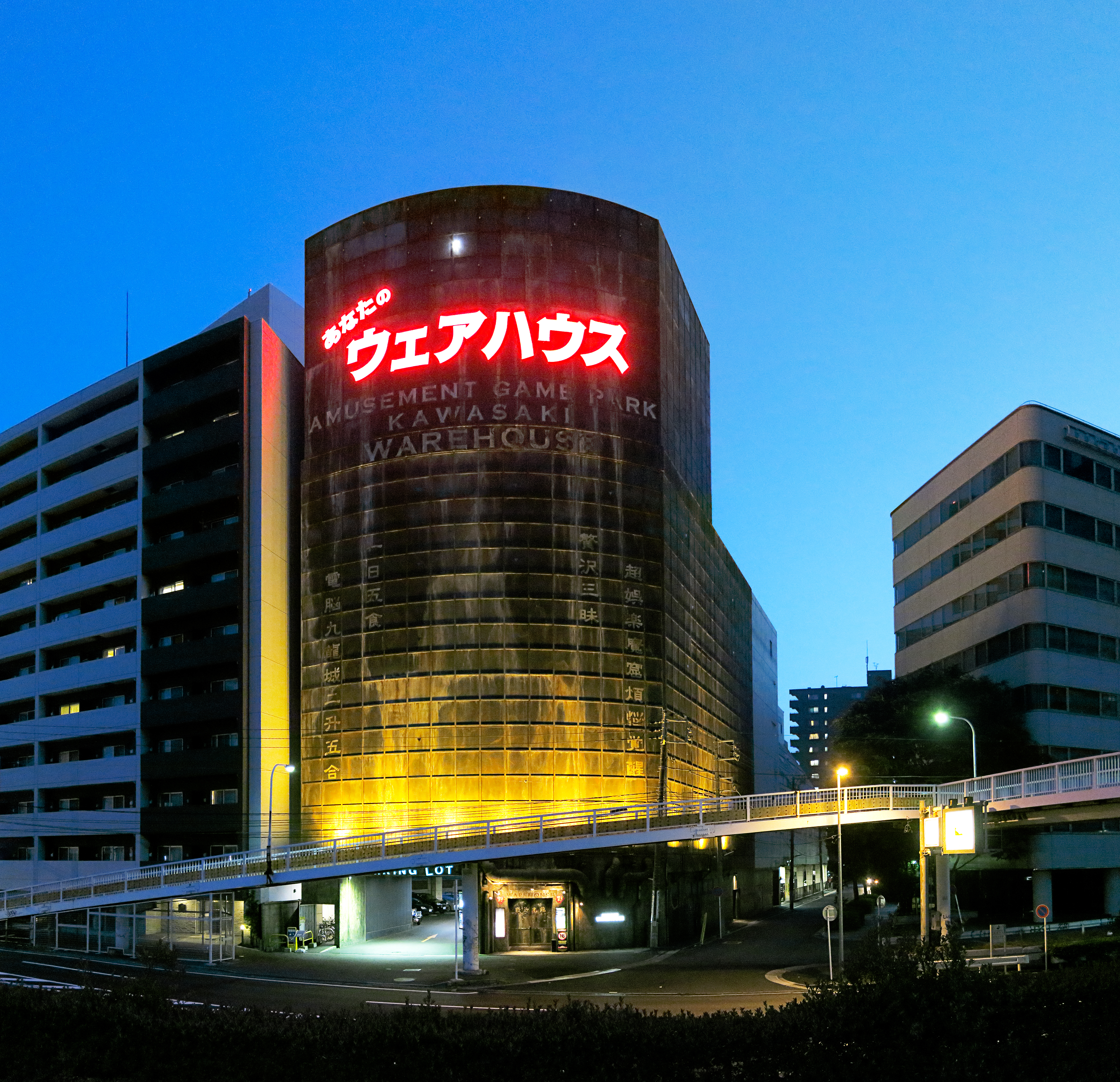
Outside of Warehouse, 2014

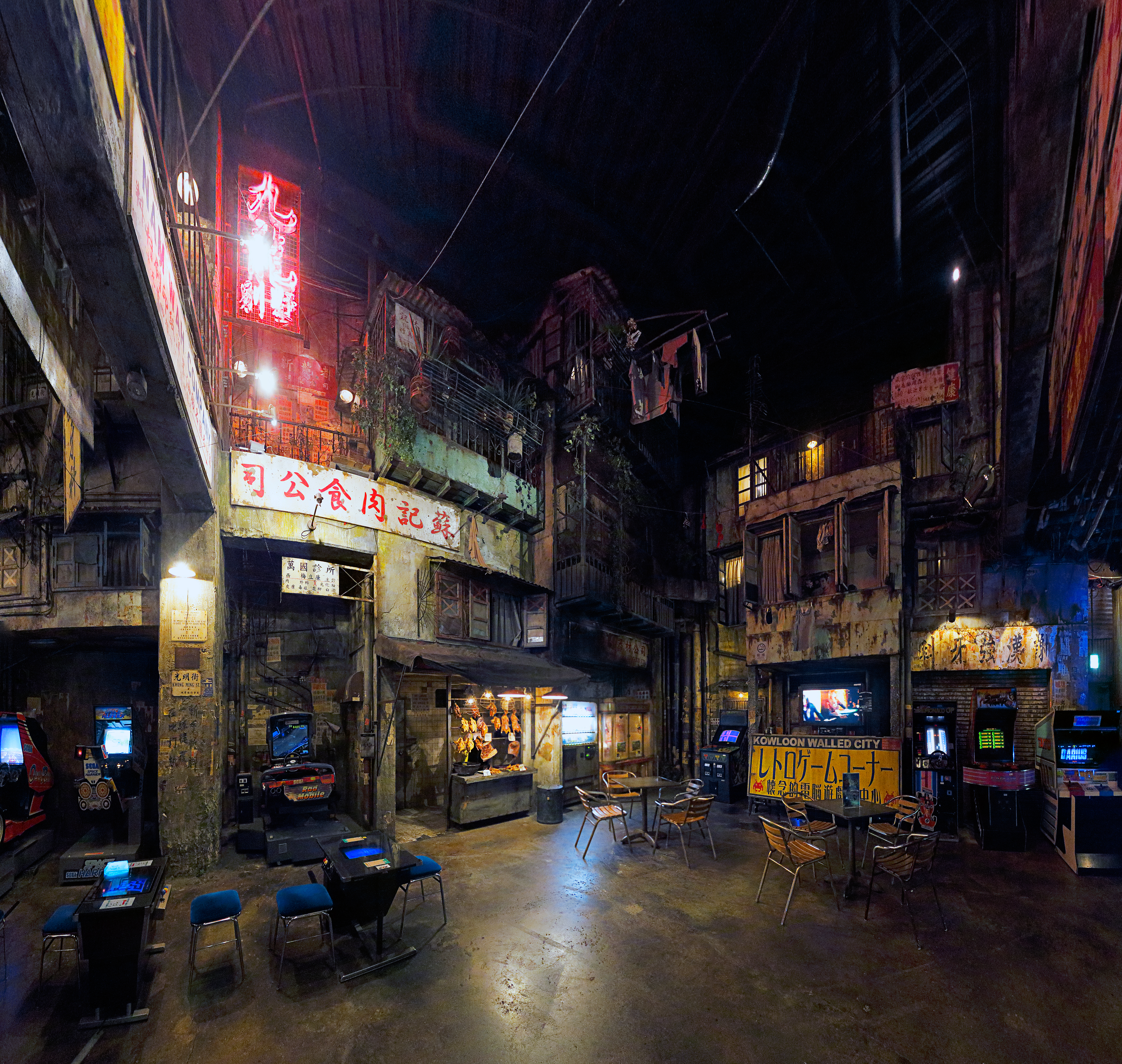
Cyber Kowloon Walled City, within Warehouse Kawasaki, in 2014

Warehouse Kawasaki was a five-story amusement facility in Kawasaki, Japan, under Geo Corporation's Anata no Warehouse (あなたのウェアハウス; lit. 'Your Warehouse') brand of themed amusement facilities and parks that operated from 2009 to 2019. It was designed to look worn down and like the former Kowloon Walled City in Hong Kong, with the design handled by the now-defunct Japanese design company Hoshino-Gumi, with props imported directly from Hong Kong. It was described as being a "gloriously authentic-looking cyberpunk dystopia". Its location was a ten-minute walk from Kawasaki Station.

The facility featured retro games in addition to modern ones, and was also a common locale for both amateur and professional photo and video shoots, such as music videos for idol groups Keyakizaka46 ("Gomen ne Christmas") and Yumemiru Adolescence ("20xx").

The facility closed on 17 November 2019.

== See also ==
- Wenheyou
