= Bloodborne =

2015 video game

- Developer: FromSoftware (Note: Co-produced and supervised by Japan Studio)
- Publisher: Sony Computer Entertainment
- Director: Hidetaka Miyazaki
- Producers: Masaaki Yamagiwa; Teruyuki Toriyama
- Designer: Kazuhiro Hamatani
- Programmer: Jun Ito
- Writer: Hidetaka Miyazaki
- Composers: Ryan Amon; Tsukasa Saitoh; Yuka Kitamura; Nobuyoshi Suzuki; Cris Velasco; Michael Wandmacher
- Platform: PlayStation 4
- Release: NA: March 24, 2015; PAL: March 25, 2015; JP: March 26, 2015; UK: March 27, 2015
- Genre: Action role-playing
- Modes: Single-player, multiplayer

Bloodborne (Note: Japanese: ブラッドボーン, Hepburn: Buraddobōn) is a 2015 action role-playing game developed by FromSoftware and published by Sony Computer Entertainment for the PlayStation 4. The game follows a Hunter through the decrepit Gothic, Victorian-era inspired city of Yharnam, whose inhabitants are afflicted with a blood-borne disease. Attempting to find the source of the plague, the player's character unravels the city's mysteries while fighting beasts and eldritch beings.

Bloodborne is played from a third-person perspective. Players control a customizable protagonist, and the gameplay is focused on strategic weapons-based combat and exploration. Players battle varied enemies while using items such as trick weapons and firearms, exploring different locations, interacting with non-player characters, and unraveling the city's mysteries. Bloodborne began development in 2012 under the working title of Project Beast. Bearing many similarities to FromSoftware's Dark Souls series, Bloodborne was inspired by the literary works of authors H. P. Lovecraft and Bram Stoker, as well as the architectural design of real-world locations in countries such as Romania and the Czech Republic.

Bloodborne has been cited as one of the greatest video games ever made, with praise directed at its gameplay, atmosphere, sound design, Lovecraftian themes and interconnected world design. Some criticism was directed at its technical performance at launch, which was improved with post-release updates. The downloadable content The Old Hunters was released in November 2015. The game had sold 7.46 million copies by February 2022. Some related media and adaptations have also been released, including a card game, board game, comic book series, and an upcoming film adaptation.

== Gameplay ==
Gameplay screenshot from an alpha build, showing the Hunter fighting the Cleric Beast.

Bloodborne is an action role-playing game played from a third-person perspective. The player controls a customizable character known as the Hunter and explores the city of Yharnam, fighting enemies and bosses, collecting items, and interacting with non-player characters. At the start of the game, the player creates the Hunter by choosing details such as name, appearance, and an "Origin", which determines the character's starting attributes.

Yharnam is structured as a series of interconnected areas, with optional locations and shortcuts unlocked through exploration. Lamps found throughout the game world act as checkpoints and allow the player to return to the Hunter's Dream, a hub area where the player can buy items, level up, upgrade weapons, and travel to other areas.

Combat emphasizes dodging, counterattacking, and close-range aggression. The Rally system allows the player to regain a portion of recently lost health by quickly striking an enemy after taking damage. Many melee weapons are "trick weapons", which can transform between two forms with different attacks. Firearms are generally used to interrupt or parry enemy attacks, creating openings for powerful visceral attacks.

Defeating enemies grants Blood Echoes, which are used as currency and for character progression. If the player dies, their Blood Echoes are dropped at the site of death or held by a nearby enemy; they can be recovered by returning to that location, but are permanently lost if the player dies again before reclaiming them. Insight is a secondary currency obtained through events such as encountering or defeating bosses. It can be spent on items and multiplayer actions, and accumulating Insight changes some aspects of the game world.

The game includes online multiplayer features. Players can summon others for cooperative play, invade other players' worlds for player-versus-player combat, and leave messages that appear in other players' games. Bloodborne also features Chalice Dungeons, optional dungeons accessed through ritual items. Some Chalice Dungeons have fixed layouts, while "root" versions use procedural generation to create new arrangements of rooms, enemies, and rewards.

== Synopsis ==
=== Setting ===
Bloodborne is set in Yharnam, a decaying Gothic city known for blood ministration, a medical practice built around the healing properties of blood. Before the events of the game, scholars at the city's College of Byrgenwerth discover the existence of a race of eldritch beings dubbed Great Ones and a substance known as the old blood that can seemingly heal any illness. Using the old blood, the Healing Church, an institution founded by Byrgenwerth breakaways, spreads blood ministration throughout Yharnam. The practice is connected to a plague that transforms people into beasts, leading to the deployment of Hunters to kill the infected. Ever since, the Healing Church has succumbed to the infighting of its upper echelons. The player controls an unnamed Hunter who travels between Yharnam and the Hunter's Dream, a mysterious realm overseen by Gehrman, an elderly Hunter.

=== Plot ===
The Hunter arrives in Yharnam seeking "Paleblood" and receives a blood transfusion. After the procedure, they awaken during a night of the Hunt, when Yharnam's citizens and Hunters kill those transformed by the plague. Trapped in the Hunter's Dream, the Hunter is guided to the Healing Church's grand cathedral, where a vision points them toward Byrgenwerth.

At Byrgenwerth, the Hunter defeats Rom, a spider-like being whose death reveals the blood moon and the influence of the Great Ones. The Hunter then encounters signs of Queen Yharnam, her child Mergo, and the Nightmare of Mensis. In the hidden village of Yahar'gul, the Hunter defeats the One Reborn and enters the Nightmare of Mensis. There, they kill Micolash, leader of the School of Mensis, and Mergo's Wet Nurse, ending the nightmare.

Afterwards, the Hunter returns to the Hunter's Dream, where Gehrman offers to release them.

- If the Hunter accepts, Gehrman kills them, and they awaken in Yharnam at sunrise.
- If the Hunter refuses, they defeat Gehrman, but the Dream's master, the Moon Presence, binds them to the Hunter's Dream as his replacement.
- If the Hunter has consumed three umbilical cords associated with the Great Ones before refusing, they resist the Moon Presence, kill it, and are reborn as an infant Great One.

=== The Old Hunters ===
In The Old Hunters, the Hunter enters the Hunter's Nightmare, a realm that imprisons hunters consumed by bloodlust. Moving through the Nightmare, they fight hunters transformed into beasts and eventually reach a clock tower guarded by Lady Maria, one of Gehrman's former pupils.

After defeating Maria, the Hunter discovers the Fishing Hamlet, whose inhabitants were experimented on after Byrgenwerth scholars discovered the corpse of Kos, a Great One. At the village's shore, the Hunter finally discovers the curse's source: Kos' post-mortem-born child. After the hunter subsequently fights and slays the creature, its spirit is released from Kos' corpse, ending the curse of the Hunter's Nightmare.

== Development ==
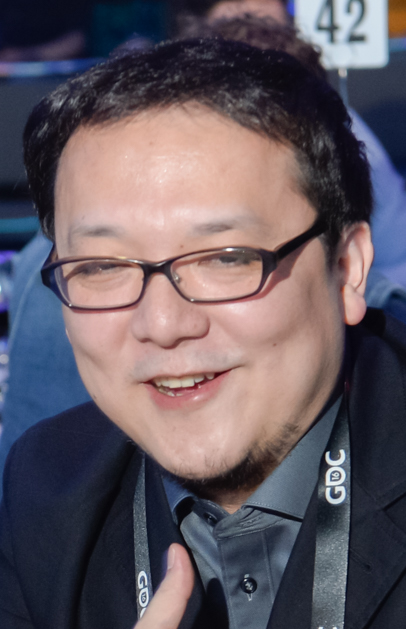
Bloodborne was directed by Hidetaka Miyazaki.

Japan Studio, a subsidiary of Sony Interactive Entertainment, approached FromSoftware concerning cooperative development on a title, and director Hidetaka Miyazaki asked about the possibility of developing a game for eighth-generation consoles. The concept of Bloodborne developed from there. There were no connections to FromSoftware's previous titles, even though Miyazaki conceded that it "carries the DNA of Demon's Souls and its very specific level design". Development ran parallel to that of Dark Souls II.

Miyazaki designed the game's world to combine elements of the hub structure used in Demon's Souls with the interconnected environments of Dark Souls. Yharnam and its surrounding areas form a connected world, while the Hunter's Dream serves as its central hub.

The game's Victorian Gothic setting was partly inspired by the novel Dracula, and the architecture of locations in Romania and the Czech Republic. Miyazaki also enjoyed H. P. Lovecraft's Cthulhu Mythos series of surreal horror stories, and applied similar themes into the game. Miyazaki had wanted to create a game set in such an era as those novels, but he wanted everything to be as detailed as possible, and felt that such a game was only possible on eighth generation hardware. This need for high-end hardware, and the fact that the PlayStation 4 was presented to the company first, was the reason the game was a PS4 exclusive, rather than a cross-generation release. The developers' target frame rate for the title was 30 frames per second, due to their design choices made for the title.

Story details were more plentiful than in the Dark Souls games, though the team created a larger mystery at the heart of the story to compensate for this. The method through which the story is shown and developed to the player is also done in a similar style to Miyazaki's other games, especially the Souls series, in that the plot is revealed with item descriptions, interactions with various NPCs, visual storytelling, and from the player's own inferences and interpretation of the plot. The team did not want to raise the difficulty level higher than their previous games as they felt it would make the game "pretty much unplayable for anyone". To balance this out, the team created a more aggressive combat system focusing on both action and strategy. They also wanted to alter the penalties for death used in the Souls games as they did not want the game to be classified as being for hardcore gamers. One of the more difficult decisions the team faced was the introduction of guns as weapons. Because it would fit well into the game's setting, and that it would consequently be less accurate than modern models, guns were eventually included, taking the place of shields from the previous Souls titles.

Bloodborne's soundtrack contains over 80 minutes of original music by Ryan Amon, Tsukasa Saitoh, Yuka Kitamura, Nobuyoshi Suzuki, Cris Velasco, and Michael Wandmacher, featuring performances by a 65-piece orchestra and a 32-member choir. The development of the soundtrack lasted for around two and a half years.

Screenshots and a gameplay trailer of the game were leaked on the Internet weeks before the official reveal, under the title of Project Beast. Many believed at the time that the leak could be connected to Demon's Souls. However, Miyazaki later stated that Bloodborne was never considered to be Demon's Souls II, due to Sony Computer Entertainment wanting a new intellectual property (IP) for the PlayStation 4.

== Release ==
Bloodborne was announced at E3 2014, where a trailer was shown. In January 2015, Bloodborne became Game Informer's readers' most anticipated game of 2015. The game was originally planned to be released on February 6, 2015, but was delayed to March 24, 2015, in North America, March 25, 2015, in Europe, Australia and New Zealand, March 26, 2015, in Japan, and March 27, 2015, in the United Kingdom and Ireland. A downloadable content expansion, The Old Hunters, was released on November 24, 2015. It takes place within a world where hunters of the past are trapped, and features new weapons, outfits, and items.

A limited collector's edition was launched with the game. It includes a SteelBook case, a hard cover art book, and a digital copy of the game's soundtrack. The soundtrack was released separately on April 21, 2015. The European exclusive Nightmare Edition included physical items such as a quill and ink set, as well as all the items in the collector's edition. An Asian edition includes a letter opener modeled off of the in-game weapon, the Kirkhammer. A PlayStation 4 bundle is also available in Asian regions. A song to promote Bloodborne was recorded by the Hit House featuring Ruby Friedman for a trailer and TV spot of the game, titled "Hunt You Down", written by Scott Miller and William Hunt, and recorded by Wyn Davis in Los Angeles and at Word of Mouth Recording Studios in New Orleans.

Sony Denmark teamed up with Danish organization GivBlod in order to encourage blood donations through a program where donators who donated on March 23, 2015, would receive a chance to win Bloodborne as a gift. An officially licensed card game, based on the game's Chalice Dungeons, was published by CoolMiniOrNot and released in November 2016. In February 2018, a tie-in comic book series written by Ales Kot and published by Titan Comics was released. It ran for four volumes, with each volume being a standalone story. A fifth volume launched in July 2022, written by Cullen Bunn.

Bloodborne had long been a title that players sought a remake for modern consoles and to fix some of the technical issues with the game's original release. Bluepoint Games, a Sony first-party studio, had previously done a Demon's Souls remake in 2020, and had looked into doing one for Bloodborne. Following the cancellation of a live service God of War game in 2025, Bluepoint pitched the Bloodborne remake, but were told that FromSoftware was not interested in pursuing it.

== Reception ==
Reception

Aggregate scores
Aggregator	Score
Metacritic	92/100
OpenCritic	98% recommend (Note: Based on 111 reviews)

Review scores
Publication	Score
Destructoid	9/10
Edge	10/10
Electronic Gaming Monthly	9.5/10
Game Informer	9.75/10
GameRevolution	4/5
GameSpot	9/10
GamesRadar+	4.5/5
IGN	9.1/10
Polygon	9/10
New York Daily News	5/5
The Guardian	5/5
The Daily Telegraph	5/5

Bloodborne received "universal acclaim" from critics, according to review aggregator Metacritic. Daniel Tack of Game Informer praised the game's unsettling atmosphere and the aesthetic visuals, which he stated, "had brought horror to life". He also praised its challenging gameplay, which he compared to the Dark Souls series, as well as its intimately-realized story, high replay value, deliberate, rewarding and fast-paced combat, sparse storytelling and satisfying weapon customization. He was also impressed by the well-crafted boss battles, unique enemy design, and soundtrack. He also praised the multiplayer for extending the longevity of the game, and the game for allowing players to learn and adapt throughout a playthrough. He summarized the review by saying that "While this new IP doesn't stray far from the established Souls franchise, it is a magical, wondrous work that admirably instills both terror and triumph in those brave enough to delve into it."

Edge wrote that it was a "dazzling work of dark, abject horror that cements Miyazaki as one of the all-time greats." Electronic Gaming Monthly wrote "Though built on the same core as the Souls games, Bloodborne marks the largest departure from the status quo to date. The numerous changes, many in service of a faster and more aggressive playstyle, might not be for everyone, but if you embrace that shift, you might well have a new favorite in the FromSoftware canon." Kevin VanOrd of GameSpot praised its Lovecraftian horror-themed storyline, energetic boss battles, precise combat for making encounters with enemies fun, as well as its unique artistry and varied environments. He also praised the sound design of the enemies, the difficulty, which he compared to Dark Souls II, and the melee-based weapons featured in the game for allowing transformation during battle. Regarding the survival horror portion of the game, he stated that it succeeded in making players feel disturbed. The interconnected design of the game world is also praised for making discovery rewarding. Writing for GamesRadar, Ben Griffin praised the game's detailed environments, Gothic-styled visuals, rich combat, fresh challenges, the randomized Chalice Dungeons for extending the game's length and the rewarding character upgrade system. He also praised the game for delivering a sense of progression and offering players motivation to finish the game, as well as the narrative for "intertwining with the geography of Yharnam". However, he criticized the game's non-divergent class system, as well as the specialization, as he stated that "lack of magic, miracles, pyromancy, archery, heavy, medium, and light options discourages experimentation." He also criticized the game for always forcing players to upgrade and stock weapons only in certain sections of the game.

Destructoid's Chris Carter called it "the most stable Souls game to date", he praised the game's emphasis on melee combat and raw skill, as well as the game's interesting NPCs, sidequests and interactions. He criticized the limited competitive multiplayer, low replay value, as well as the occasionally blocked area in the game, which he stated "feel less sprawling and less replayable" than previous FromSoftware games. He summarized the review by saying that "Bloodborne is an interesting mix of everything FromSoftware has learned throughout its storied developmental career. FromSoftware is still one of the only developers left that makes you work for your satisfaction, and Bloodborne is damn satisfying." IGN's Brandin Tyrrel wrote that Bloodborne was "an amazing, exacting, and exhausting pilgrimage through a gorgeous land that imposes the feeling of approaching the bottom of a descent into madness. Though extended load times and minor frame-rate hitches have an effect on the pacing, it's otherwise an intensely challenging and rewarding game. There's an incredible power to unlocking its mysteries, and in succeeding, despite its demand for a pound of your flesh."

Game Revolution's Nick Tan was more critical than most but still quite positive, criticizing the restrictive builds and the unreliable firearms. He also noted that the game suffered from lock-on and camera issues. He summarized the review by saying that "Though not as refined and freeform as some of its predecessors, it continues in the longstanding Souls tradition of lending credence to challenging games and making the seemingly Sisyphean task of conquering ruthless, malformed monstrosities possible and downright commendable." Michael McWhertor of Polygon thought that the story was "intriguing", saying the guns were unlike any other he had used in another game, in that the Visceral attacks give the player "one of the best feelings in any game", praised the game's difficulty for providing satisfying encounters, and thought the cryptic mysteries did a good job at encouraging the player to progress through the game. He also praised the game's environments, enemies, and weapons, as he thought they were well-designed and offered the player freedom and variety. McWhertor's main criticisms were concerning the load times and technical issues. He found that the game performed noticeably worse when playing with another player, saying that the frame rate "takes a hit". He also found some mechanics and items confusing, and disliked the fact that there are many loading screens in quick succession. New York Daily News stated that it was "the perfect marriage, blending mechanics that seem easy to learn with gameplay and challenge that demands mastery and ingenuity." The Guardian also gave it a full five-star rating, stating that "elegance, precision, humor, and challenge make Bloodborne irresistible." The Telegraph wrote that it was the "digital edition of a round-the-world trip to foreign continents, each turning of a corner providing equal helpings of excitement and trepidation". At launch, one of the more criticized points of the game was its long loading times, which were later mitigated via post-release patches.

The DLC was also well-received, with 89 percent of critics recommending it on review aggregate site Opencritic. (Note: Based on 42 reviews)

=== Sales ===
Bloodborne sold 152,567 physical retail units within the first week of release in Japan, ranking first place within the Japanese software sales charts for that particular week. Bloodborne debuted at number two in the United Kingdom software retail chart, behind Battlefield Hardline by 22,500 units. In the United States, Bloodborne was the second best-selling software in March, despite being released at the end of the month.

By April 2015, Bloodborne had sold over one million units, and by September 2015, the game had over two million units sold. Soon after release, Sony stated that the game's sales exceeded their expectations. By February 2022, the game had sold 7.46 million units. By November 2025, the game was estimated to have sold 9.3 million units.

=== Awards ===
Bloodborne was awarded the 2015 Game of the Year by several video game review sites, including GameTrailers, Eurogamer, Destructoid, and Edge, along with being awarded the "2015 PlayStation 4 Game of the Year" by IGN. In 2015, Edge rated it the fourth greatest video game of all time. A 2023 poll conducted by GQ which surveyed a team of video game journalists across the industry ranked Bloodborne as the fourth best video game of all time.

Year	Award	Category	Result	Ref.
2015	Golden Joystick Awards	Game of the Year	Nominated	
2015	Golden Joystick Awards	Best Original Game	Won	
2015	Golden Joystick Awards	Best Storytelling	Nominated	
2015	Golden Joystick Awards	Best Visual Design	Nominated	
2015	Golden Joystick Awards	Best Audio	Nominated	
2015	Golden Joystick Awards	Best Multiplayer Game	Nominated	
2015	Golden Joystick Awards	Best Gaming Moment	Nominated	
2015	Golden Joystick Awards	PlayStation Game of the Year	Won	
2015	The Game Awards 2015	Game of the Year	Nominated	
2015	The Game Awards 2015	Best Role Playing Game	Nominated	
2015	The Game Awards 2015	Best Art Direction	Nominated	
2015	Canadian Videogame Awards 2015	Fans' Choice: Best International Game	Nominated	
2016	19th Annual D.I.C.E. Awards	Game of the Year	Nominated	
2016	19th Annual D.I.C.E. Awards	Role-Playing/Massively Multiplayer Game of the Year	Nominated	
2016	Game Developers Choice Awards	Game of the Year	Nominated	
2016	Game Developers Choice Awards	Best Design	Nominated	
2016	Game Developers Choice Awards	Best Visual Art	Nominated	
2016	12th British Academy Games Awards	Game Design	Won	

== Film adaptation ==
In April 2026, Sony Pictures announced an adult animated feature film based on the game, with YouTuber Seán McLoughlin (jacksepticeye) on board as producer. The film will be produced by PlayStation Productions, Lyrical Animation and Seán McLoughlin.

== See also ==
- Bloodborne PSX
