= Kowloon Walled City =

Former slum in Hong Kong

Kowloon Walled City 九龍城寨
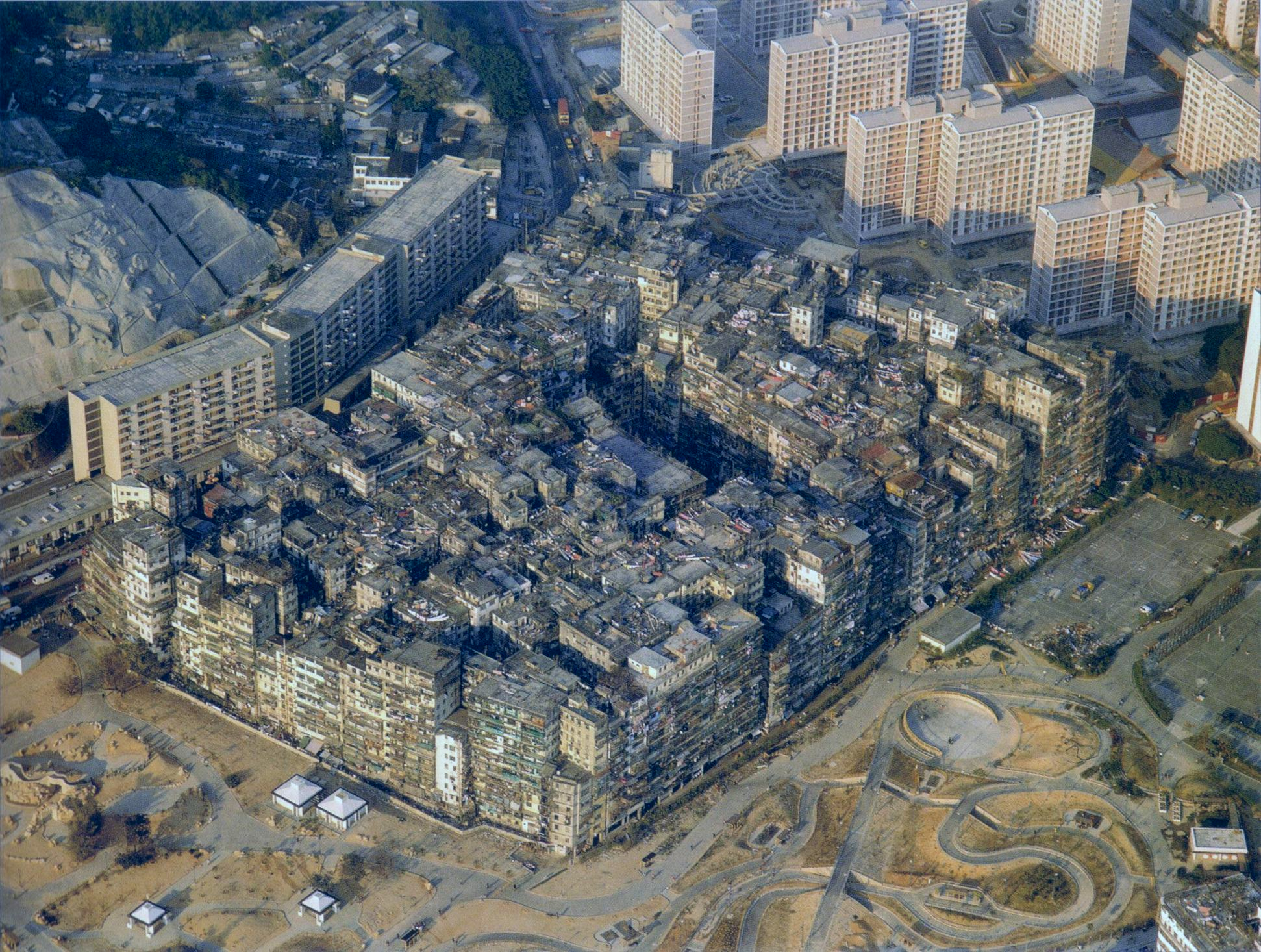
- The city in 1989

- Location within Hong Kong
- Coordinates: 22°19′56″N 114°11′25″E
- Country / City: China (de jure, 1898–1994); British Hong Kong (jurisdiction disputed, largely ungoverned); Japan (de facto occupation, 1941–1945)
- District: Kowloon City District
- Area: Kowloon City
- Fortified: 1847
- Became an enclave: 1898
- Demolished: 1993–1994

Area
  - Total: 2.6 ha (6.4 acres)

Population (1990)
  - Total: 35,000
  - Density: 1,300,000/km^{2} (3,500,000/sq mi)

Kowloon Walled City
- Traditional Chinese: 九龍城寨
- Simplified Chinese: 九龙城寨
- Cantonese Yale: Gáulùhng Sìhng Jaaih
Transcriptions
Standard Mandarin
- Hanyu Pinyin: Jiǔlóng Chéng Zhài
- Bopomofo: ㄐㄧㄡˇ ㄌㄨㄥˊ ㄔㄥˊ ㄓㄞˋ
- Wade–Giles: Chiu^{3}-lung^{2} Chʻeng^{2} Chai^{4}
- Tongyong Pinyin: Jiǒulóng Chéng Jhài
- IPA: [tɕjòʊ.lʊ̌ŋ ʈʂʰə̌ŋʈʂâɪ]
Wu
- Wugniu: cieu^{3} lon^{2} zen^{2} ze^{6}
- IPA: Shanghainese: [tɕiɤ˧ loŋ˦ zən˨ ze˧]
Hakka
- Romanization: Giu^{3}liung^{2} shang^{2} cai^{4}
Yue: Cantonese
- Yale Romanization: Gáulùhng Sìhng Jaaih
- Jyutping: gau^{2} lung^{4} sing^{4} zaai^{6}
- IPA: [kɐw˧˥ lʊŋ˩ sɪŋ˩ tsaj˨]

Alternative Chinese name
- Traditional Chinese: 九龍寨城
- Simplified Chinese: 九龙寨城
- Cantonese Yale: Gáulùhng Jaaih Sìhng
Transcriptions
Standard Mandarin
- Hanyu Pinyin: Jiǔlóng Zhài Chéng
- Bopomofo: ㄐㄧㄡˇ ㄌㄨㄥˊ ㄓㄞˋ ㄔㄥˊ
- Wade–Giles: Chiu^{3}-lung^{2} Chai^{4} Chʻeng^{2}
- Tongyong Pinyin: Jiǒulóng Jhài Chéng
- IPA: [tɕjòʊ.lʊ̌ŋ ʈʂâɪʈʂʰə̌ŋ]
Wu
- Wugniu: cieu^{3} lon^{2} ze^{6} zen^{2}
- IPA: Shanghainese: [tɕiɤ˧ loŋ˦ ze˨ zən˧]
Hakka
- Romanization: Giu^{3}liung^{2} cai^{4} shang^{2}
Yue: Cantonese
- Yale Romanization: Gáulùhng Jaaih Sìhng
- Jyutping: gau^{2} lung^{4} zaai^{6} sing^{4}
- IPA: [kɐw˧˥ lʊŋ˩ tsaj˨ sɪŋ˩]

Kowloon Walled City (Chinese: 九龍城寨; Jyutping: gau2 lung4 sing4 zaai6) was an ungoverned and densely populated de jure Chinese enclave within the boundaries of British Hong Kong. Originally the site of a military fort, it became an enclave after the New Territories were leased to Britain in 1898. The Walled City's population increased dramatically following World War II, and by 1987 it had an estimated 33,000 residents within its 2.6-hectare (6 1/2-acre) borders, making it one of the most densely populated places on Earth at approximately 1.2 million inhabitants per square kilometre (3 million per square mile). The city was demolished between 1993 and 1994; the Kowloon Walled City Park was built in its place and opened in December 1995.

The site originated as a military outpost during the Song dynasty, and was converted into a coastal fort in 1847 to reinforce Chinese authority in the area after the cession of Hong Kong Island to Britain. The 1898 Convention that leased the New Territories to Britain excluded the Walled City, and after the fall of the Qing dynasty in 1912, the succeeding Republic of China inherited this claim. After World War II, with both Britain and China reluctant to assert control, the city's population swelled with refugees fleeing the Chinese Civil War. This near-ungoverned state allowed it to grow into a massive squatter settlement, with unregulated construction from the 1960s onward creating a labyrinth of interconnected high-rise buildings built without architectural or engineering oversight.

From the 1950s to the 1970s, the Walled City was effectively controlled by local triads, becoming a haven for prostitution, gambling, and drug trafficking. The Hong Kong Police began to reduce the triads' influence with a series of major raids in the 1970s. Despite the difficult living conditions, which included poor sanitation and a near-total lack of sunlight in the lower levels, most residents lived peacefully. A strong sense of community developed, and residents established numerous small businesses, factories, and unregulated services such as schools, medical clinics, and dental practices within the city's walls.

In 1984, the British and Chinese governments agreed to demolish the city, citing the deteriorating quality of life. The formal decision was announced in 1987, and a complex eviction process involving HK$2.7 billion (US$350 million) in compensation was completed in 1992. Demolition began in March 1993 and was finished in April 1994. The Walled City's unique architecture and reputation have made it a lasting cultural touchstone, serving as an inspiration for numerous works of fiction, particularly in cyberpunk and dystopian genres, including films, video games, and literature.

== History ==
=== Military outpost ===
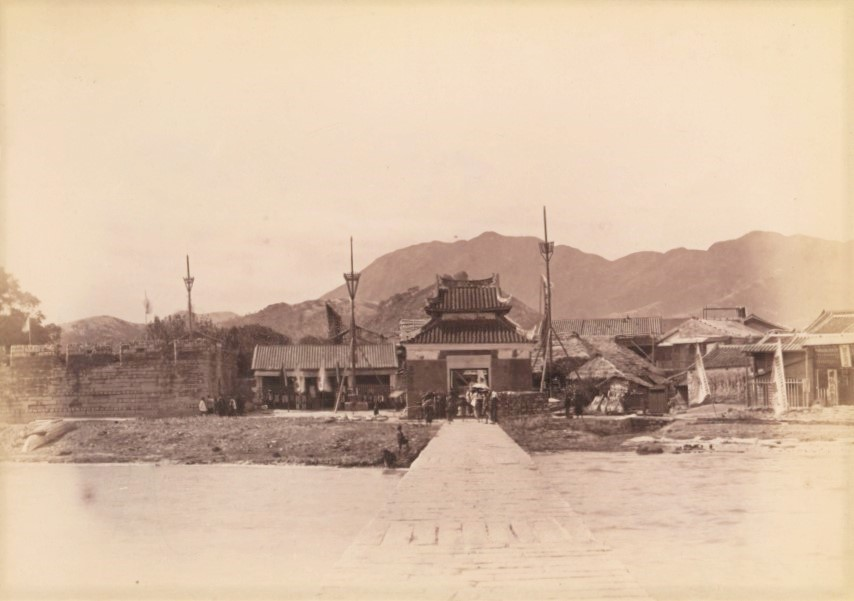
Lung Tsun Stone Bridge and Lung Tsun Pavilion (Pavilion for Greeting Officials) of Kowloon Walled City in 1898

The history of the walled city can be traced back to the Song dynasty (960–1279), when a military outpost was set up to manage the salt trade in the area. Little took place for hundreds of years afterward, although 30 guards were stationed there in 1668. A small coastal fort was established around 1810 after Chinese forces abandoned Tung Lung Fort. In 1842, during the Qing dynasty, Hong Kong Island was ceded to Britain by the Treaty of Nanking. As a result, the Qing authorities felt it necessary to improve the fort to rule the area and check further British influence. The improvements, including the formidable defensive wall, were completed in 1847. The walled city was captured by rebels during the Taiping Rebellion in 1854, before being retaken a few weeks later.

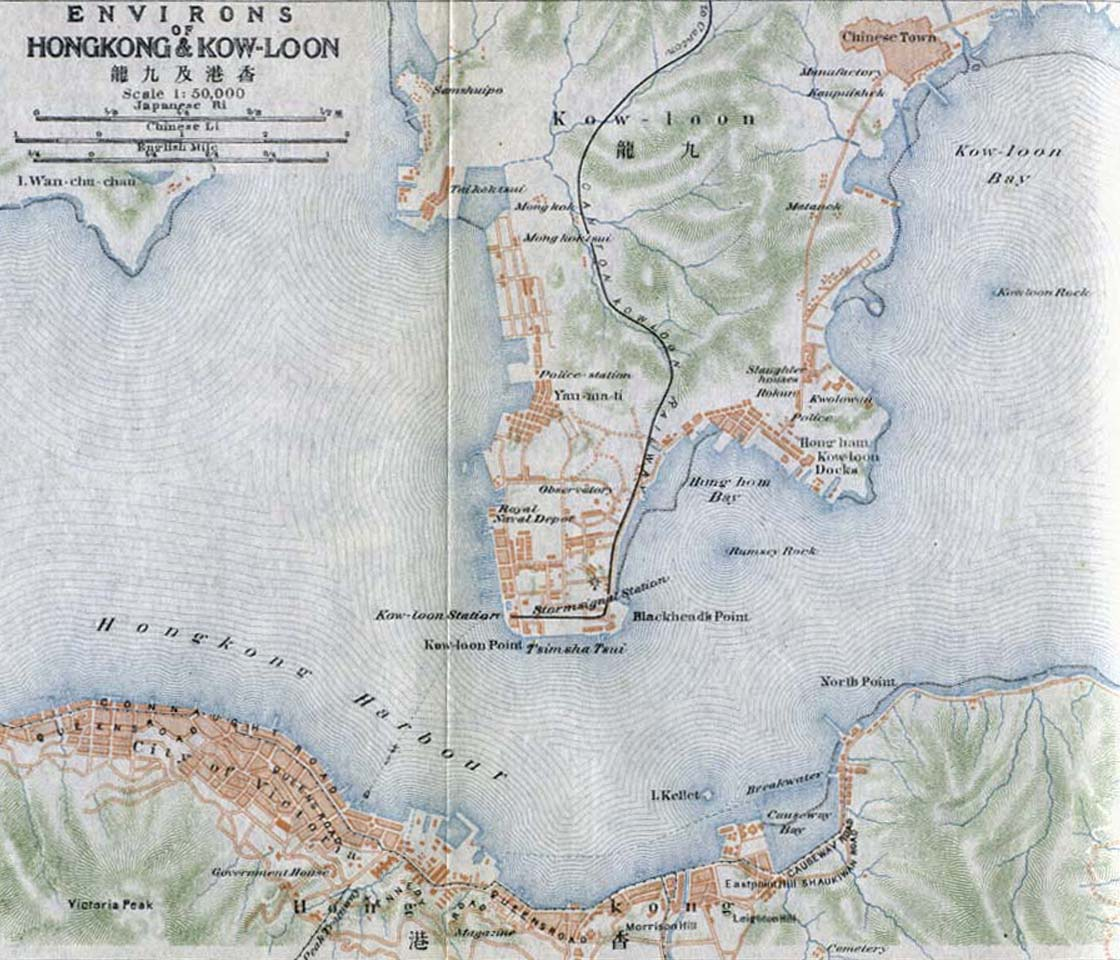
1915 map of the Hong Kong region with Kowloon Walled City listed as "Chinese Town" at the upper right-hand corner

The Convention for the Extension of Hong Kong Territory of 1898 handed additional parts of Hong Kong (the New Territories) to Britain for 99 years, but excluded the walled city, which at the time had a population of roughly 700. China was allowed to continue to keep officials there as long as they did not interfere with the defence of British Hong Kong. The following year, Hong Kong governor Henry Blake suspected that the viceroy of Canton was using troops to aid resistance to the new arrangements. On 14 April 1899, British forces attacked the walled city, only to find the viceroy's soldiers gone, leaving behind only the mandarin and 150 residents. The Qing dynasty ended its rule in 1912, leaving the walled city to the British.

Though the British claimed ownership of the walled city, they did little with it over the following few decades. The Holy Trinity Church established an old people's home in the old yamen as well as a school and an almshouse in other former offices. Aside from such institutions, however, the walled city became a mere curiosity for British colonials and tourists to visit; it was labelled as "Chinese Town" in a 1915 map. In 1933, Hong Kong authorities announced plans to demolish most of the decaying walled city's buildings, compensating the 436 squatters that lived there with new homes. That same year, the Nationalist Chinese government protested, claiming jurisdiction over the city. The Nationalist Chinese government continued to make claims on its jurisdiction throughout 1935, 1936, and the first half of 1937, until the war between China and Japan started.

By 1940, only the yamen, the school, and one house remained. During the World War II occupation of Hong Kong, the Japanese occupying forces demolished the city wall and used the stone to expand the nearby Kai Tak Airport.

=== Urban settlement ===
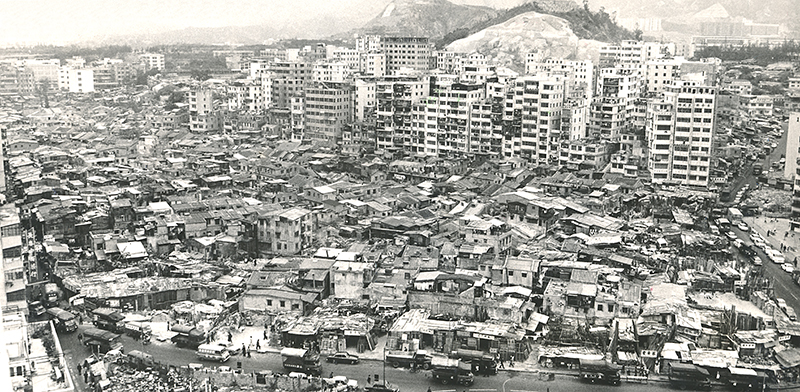
An aerial view of Kowloon Walled City and the neighbouring Sai Tau Tsuen village in 1972

After Japan's surrender in 1945, China announced its intent to reclaim the walled city. In November 1946, Nationalist Chinese officials created the "Draft Outline Plan for Reinstatement of Administration" of the area, which included an office, schools, police, and other functions. Refugees fleeing the Chinese Civil War post-1945 poured into Hong Kong, and 2,000 squatters occupied the walled city by 1947. After an attempt to drive them out in 1948, the British adopted a "hands-off" policy in most matters concerning the walled city. On 8 January 1948, the Nationalist Chinese government sent a memorandum to the British Ambassador, stating "The Ministry of Foreign Affairs now formally declare to the British Embassy that, in accordance with the provisions of the said Convention, the Chinese Government enjoys jurisdiction over the City of Kowloon and that they have no intention whatsoever of renouncing this jurisdiction." The British Foreign Office, on 4 February 1948, considered a variety of solutions (including turning the site into a Nationalist Chinese Consulate-General), and ultimately recommended that the British "accept the principle of Chinese jurisdiction over Kowloon Walled City but the Chinese agree not to attempt to exercise that jurisdiction in practice." Additionally, the British Foreign Office said that "A public garden controlled by the municipal authorities of Kowloon Leased territory offers such a solution and so would a Chinese consular compound, if the Chinese could first be induced to agree in principle to the appointment of a Consul General."

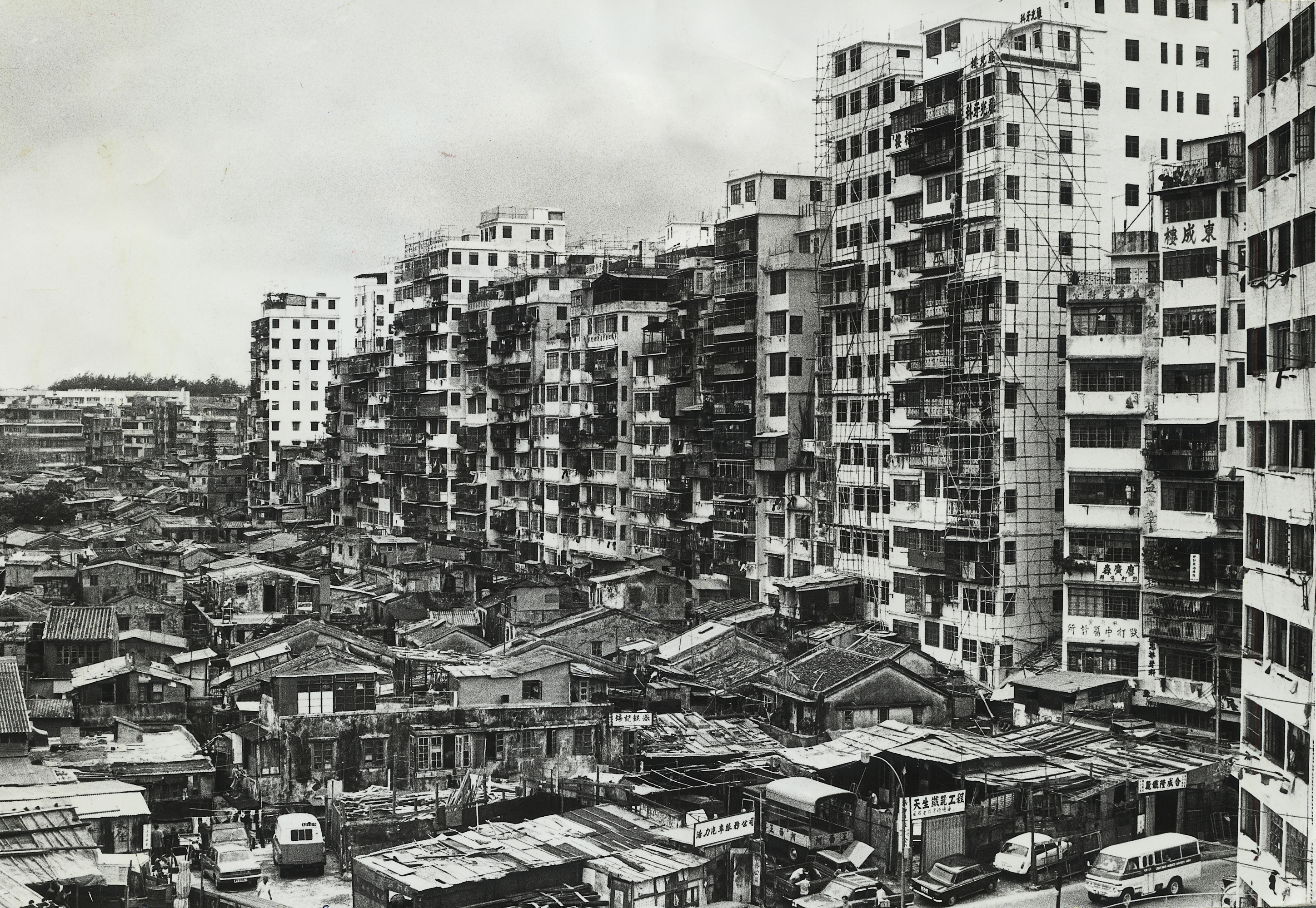
The south side of Kowloon Walled City in 1975. The elevation of the buildings begins to reach its maximum height.

In January 1950, a fire broke out that destroyed over 2,500 huts, home to nearly 3,500 families and 17,000 total people. The disaster highlighted the need for proper fire prevention in the largely wooden-built squatter areas, complicated by the lack of political ties with the colonial and Chinese governments. The ruins gave new arrivals to the walled city the opportunity to build anew, causing speculation that the fire may have been intentionally set.

With no government enforcement from the Chinese or the British aside from a few raids by the Hong Kong Police, the walled city became a haven for crime and drugs. It was only during a 1959 trial for a murder that occurred within the walled city that the Hong Kong government was ruled to have jurisdiction there. By that time, however, the walled city was virtually ruled by the organised crime syndicates known as triads.

Beginning in the 1950s, triad groups such as the 14K and Sun Yee On gained a stranglehold on the walled city's numerous brothels, gambling parlours, and opium dens. The walled city had become such a haven for criminals that police would venture into it only in large groups. It was not until 1973 and 1974, when a series of more than 3,500 police raids resulted in over 2,500 arrests and over 1,800 kilograms (4,000 lb) of drugs seized, that the triads' power began to wane. With public support, particularly from younger residents, the continued raids gradually eroded drug use and violent crime. In 1983, the district police commander declared the walled city's crime rate to be under control.

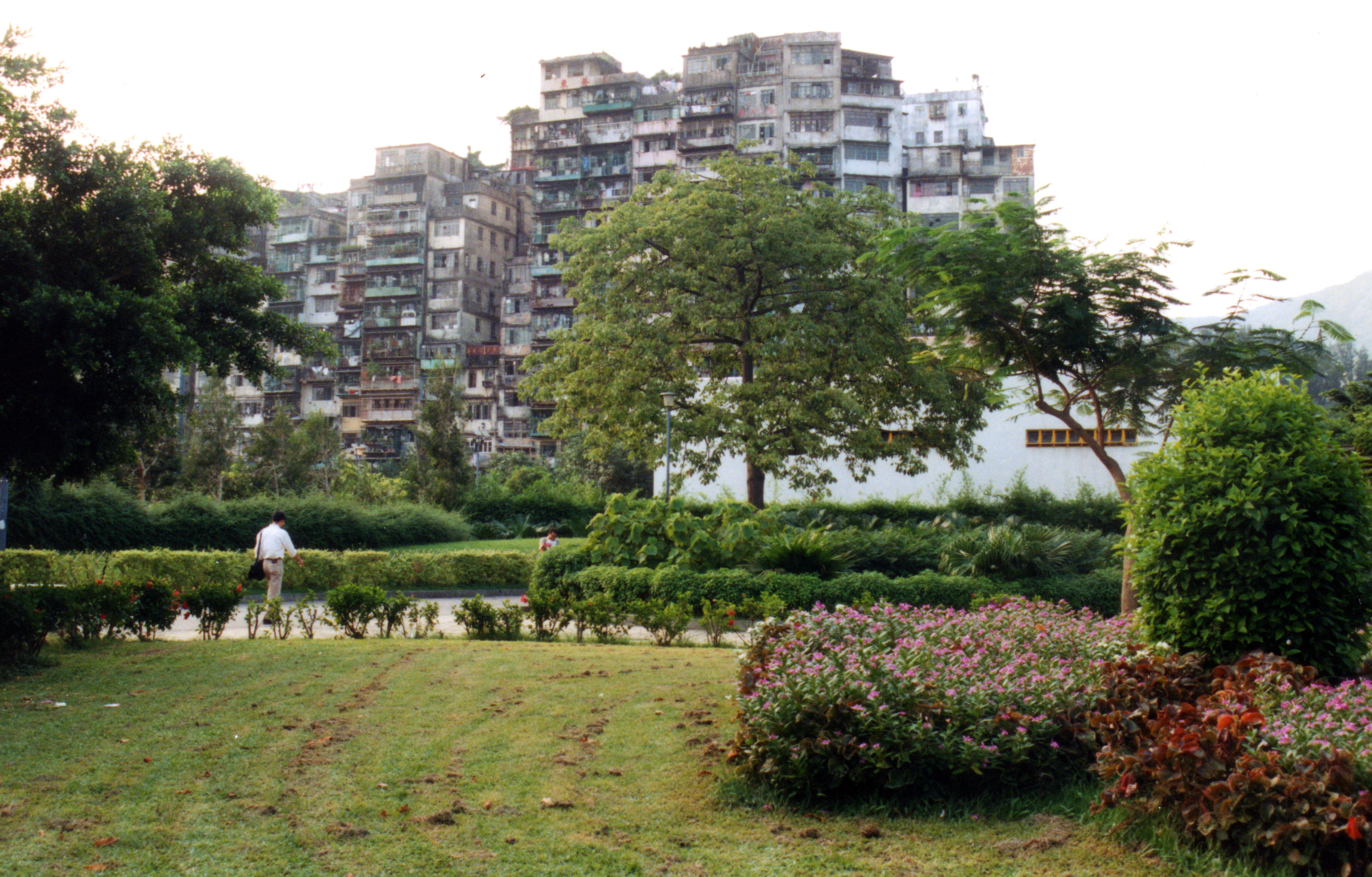
One of the outer edges in 1991

The city also underwent massive construction during the 1960s, with developers building new modular structures above older ones. The city became extremely densely populated and "a world unto its own", an enclave, with over 33,000 people in 300 buildings occupying little more than 7 acres (2.8 ha). As a result, the city reached its maximum size by the late 1970s and early 1980s; a height restriction of 13 to 14 stories had been imposed on the city due to the flight path of planes heading toward Kai Tak Airport. As well as limiting building height, the proximity of the airport subjected residents to serious noise pollution. Eight municipal pipes provided water to the entire structure, although more could have come from wells. A few of the streets were illuminated by fluorescent lights, as sunlight rarely reached the lower levels due to the outstanding disregard for air rights within the city. Although the rampant crime of earlier decades diminished in later years, the walled city was still known for its high number of unlicensed doctors and dentists who could operate there without threat of prosecution.

Although the walled city was for many years a hotbed of criminal activity, most residents were not involved in any crime and lived peacefully within its walls. Numerous small factories and businesses thrived inside the walled city, and some residents formed groups to organise and improve daily life there. An attempt by the government in 1963 to demolish some shacks in a corner of the city gave rise to an "anti-demolition committee" that served as the basis for a kaifong association. Charities, religious societies, and other welfare groups were gradually introduced to the city. While medical clinics and schools went unregulated, the Hong Kong government provided some services such as water supply and mail delivery.

=== Eviction and demolition ===
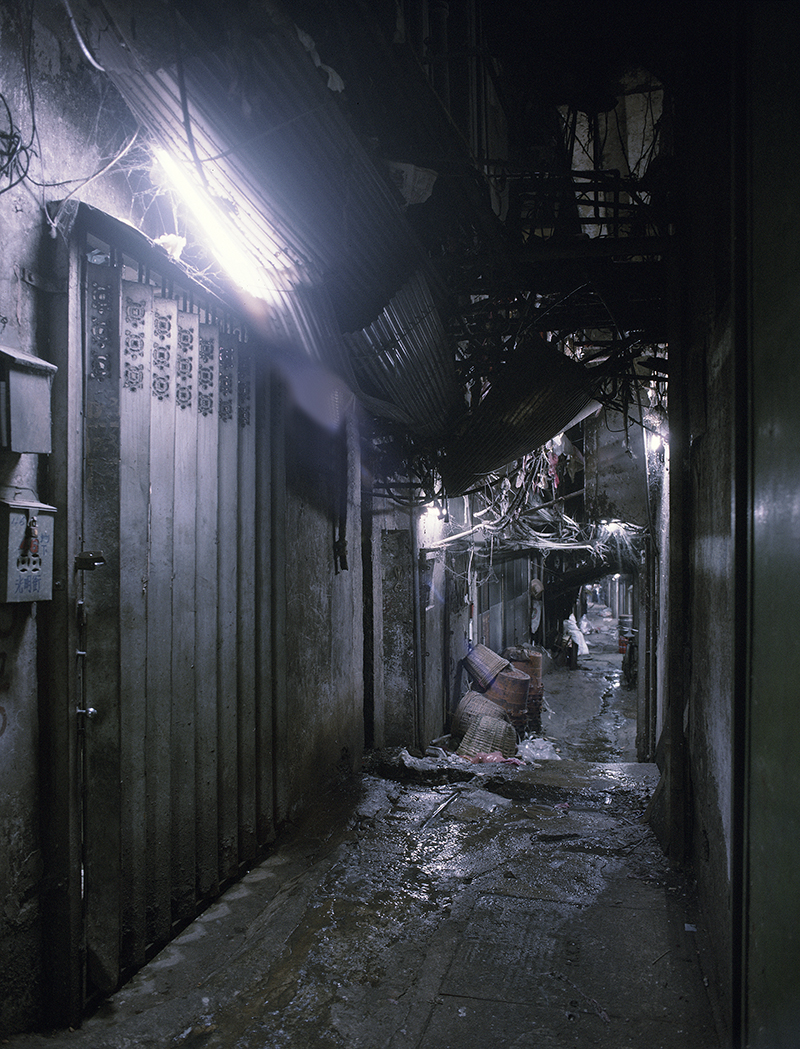
An alley in the city, 1993

The quality of life in the city—sanitary conditions in particular—remained far behind the rest of Hong Kong. The Sino-British Joint Declaration in 1984 laid the groundwork for the city's demolition. The mutual decision by the two governments to tear down the walled city was announced on 14 January 1987. On 10 March 1987, following the announcement that the walled city would be converted to a park, the Secretary for District Administration formally requested the Urban Council to take over the site following demolition. Owing to the presence of numerous other green spaces in the area, the Urban Services Department doubted the need for "yet another park" from a planning and operations point of view, but the council agreed nonetheless to accept the government's proposal on the condition that the government bear the cost of park construction.

The government distributed some HK$2.7 billion (US$350 million) in compensation to the estimated 33,000 residents and businesses in a plan devised by a special committee of the Hong Kong Housing Authority. Some residents were not satisfied with the compensation, which amounted to roughly HK$82,000 (US$10,600) per person, and were forcibly evicted between November 1991 and July 1992. While it was deserted, the empty city was used to film a scene in the 1993 movie Crime Story.

After four months of planning, demolition of the walled city began on 23 March 1993 and concluded in April 1994. Construction work on Kowloon Walled City Park started the following month. Some historic structures within the former walled city have been preserved and integrated into the new park.

== The city before demolition ==
=== Layout and architecture ===
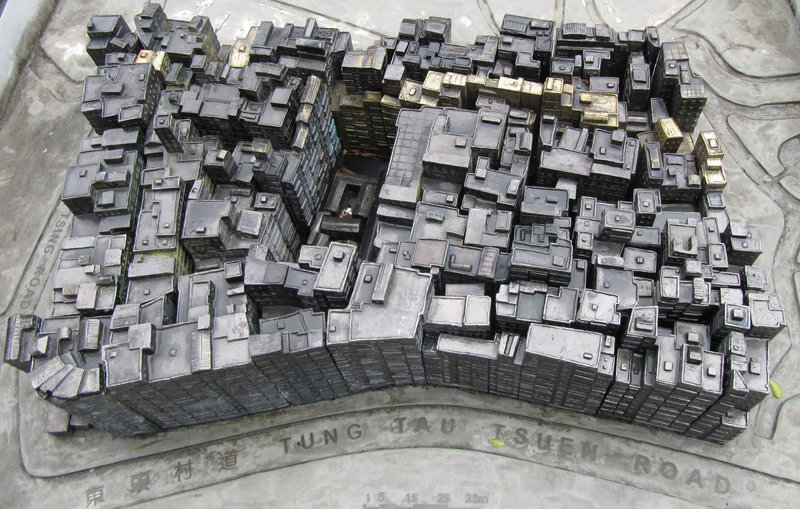
Model of Kowloon Walled City located at the entrance of Kowloon Walled City Park

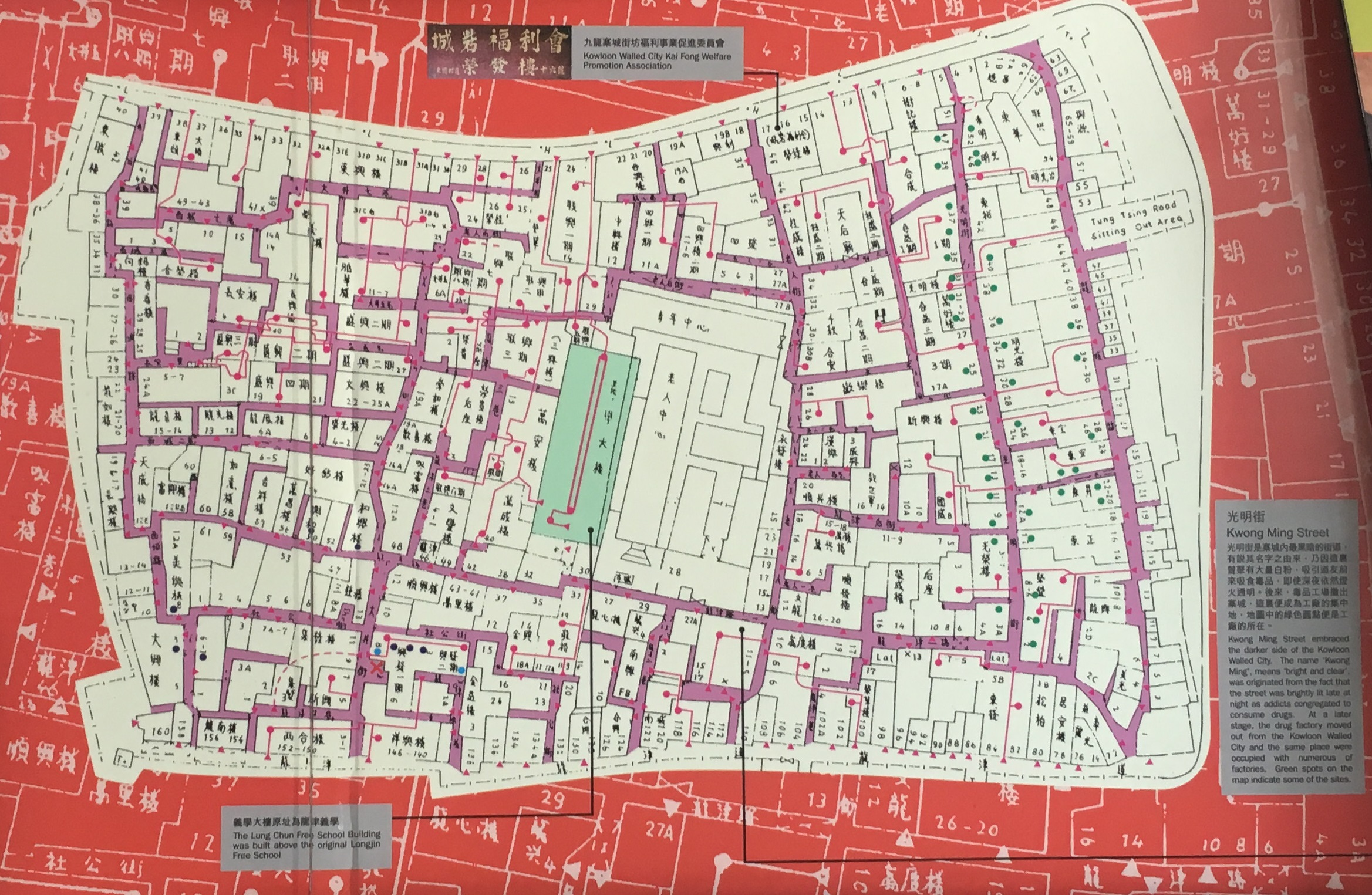
Plan of buildings and streets within Kowloon Walled City

The walled city was located in an area of Kowloon that became known as Kowloon City. In spite of its transformation from a fort into an urban enclave, the walled city retained the same basic layout. The original fort was built on a slope and consisted of a 2.6-hectare (6.4-acre) plot measuring about 210 by 120 metres (690 by 390 ft). The stone wall surrounding it had four entrances and measured 4 metres (13 ft) tall and 4.6 metres (15 ft) thick before it was dismantled in 1943.

Construction surged dramatically during the 1960s and 1970s, until the formerly low-rise city consisted almost entirely of buildings with 10 storeys or more (with the notable exception of the yamen in its centre). However, due to Kai Tak Airport's position 800 metres (0.50 mi) south of the city, buildings did not exceed 14 storeys. The two-storey Sai Tau Tsuen settlement bordered the walled city to the south and west until it was cleared in 1985 and replaced with Carpenter Road Park.

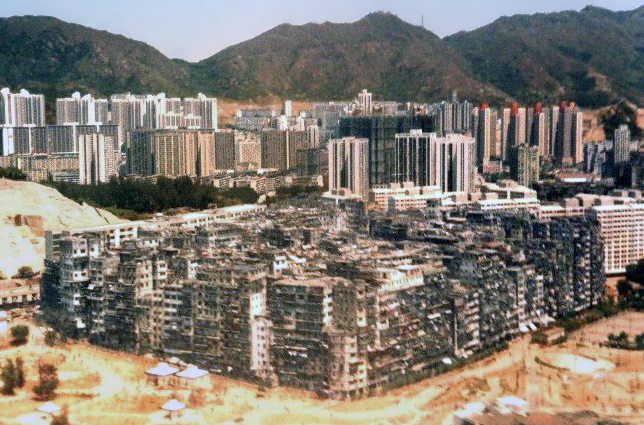
Kowloon Walled City in 1989

The city's dozens of alleyways were often only 1–2 m (3–7 ft) wide, and had poor lighting and drainage. An informal network of staircases and passageways also formed on upper levels, which was so extensive that one could travel north to south through the entire city without ever touching solid ground. Construction in the city went unregulated, and most of the roughly 350 buildings were built with poor foundations and few or no utilities. Because apartments were so small—a typical unit was 23 m^{2} (250 ft^{2})—space was maximised with wider upper floors, caged balconies and rooftop additions. Roofs in the city were full of television antennas, clothes lines, water tanks, and rubbish, and could be crossed using a series of ladders.

=== Demography ===
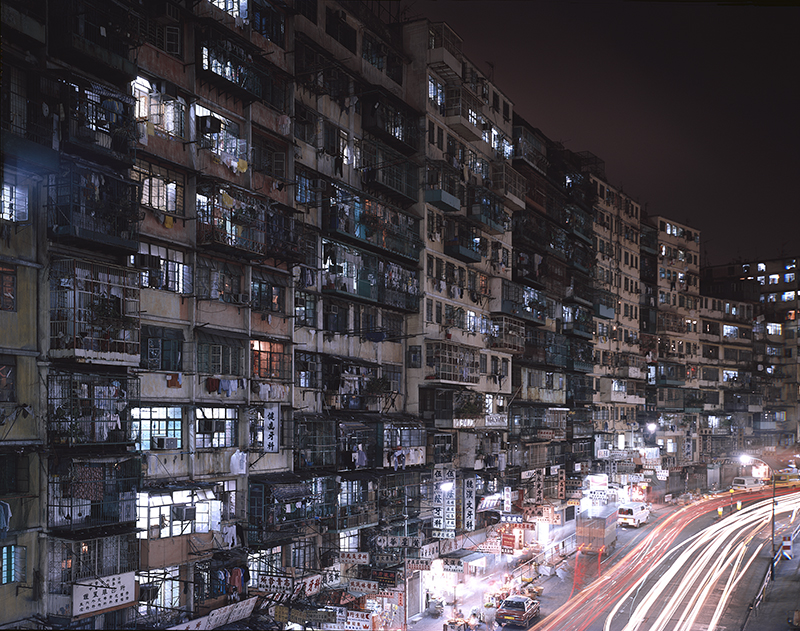
A street at the edge of the city at night in 1993

Kowloon Walled City's early population fluctuated between zero and a few hundred, and began growing steadily shortly after World War II. However, there is no accurate population information available for much of the walled city's later existence. Official census numbers estimated the walled city's population at 10,004 in 1971 and 14,617 in 1981. Informal estimates, on the other hand, often mistakenly included the neighbouring squatter village of Sai Tau Tsuen. Population figures of about 50,000 were also reported.

A thorough government survey in 1987 gave a clearer picture: an estimated 33,000 people resided within the walled city. Based on this survey, the walled city had a population density of approximately 1,255,000 inhabitants per square kilometre (3,250,000/sq mi) in 1987, making it the most densely populated spot in the world. Names in Kowloon Walled City were mostly Cantonese.

=== Culture ===
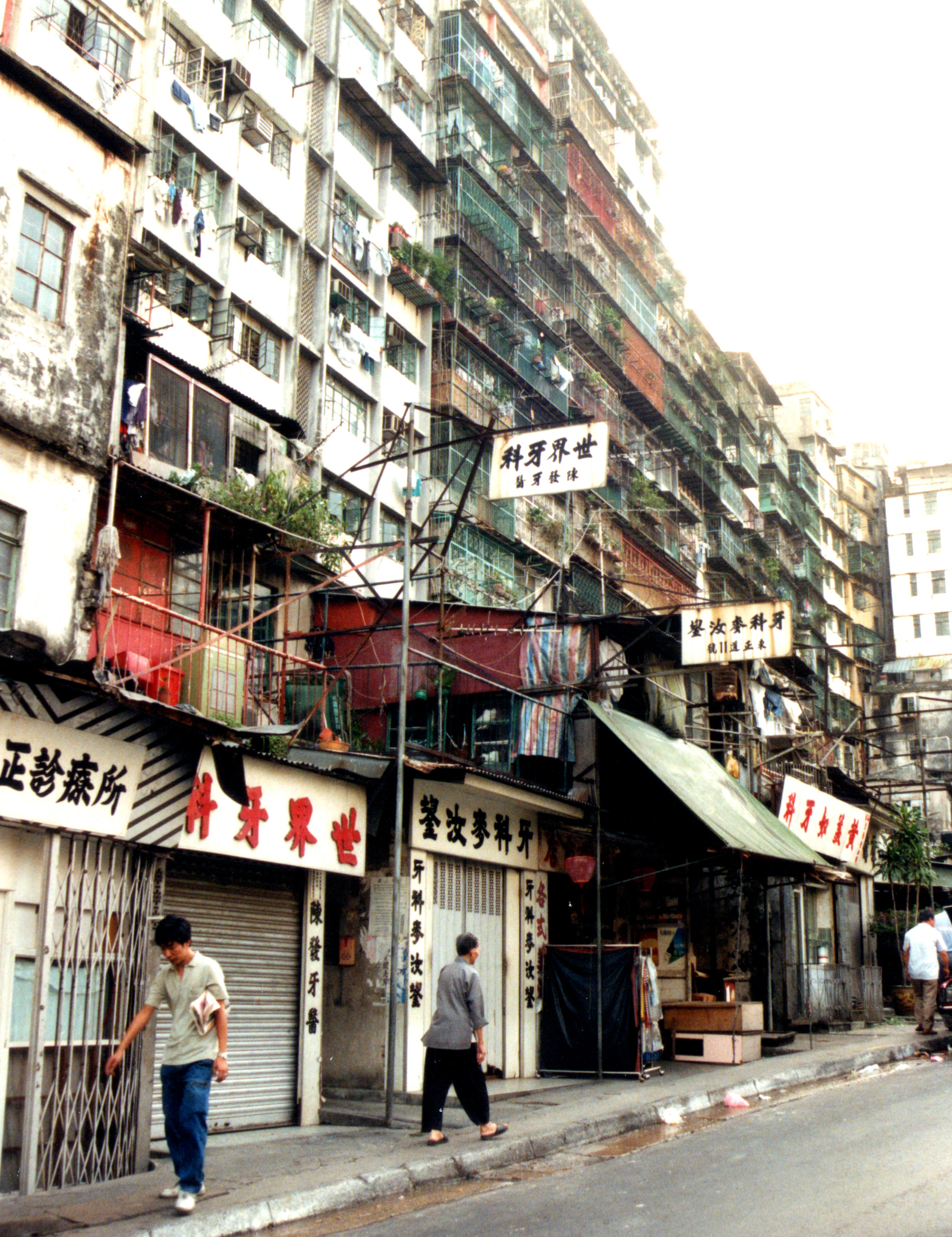
Numerous dental clinics at an edge of the walled city in 1991

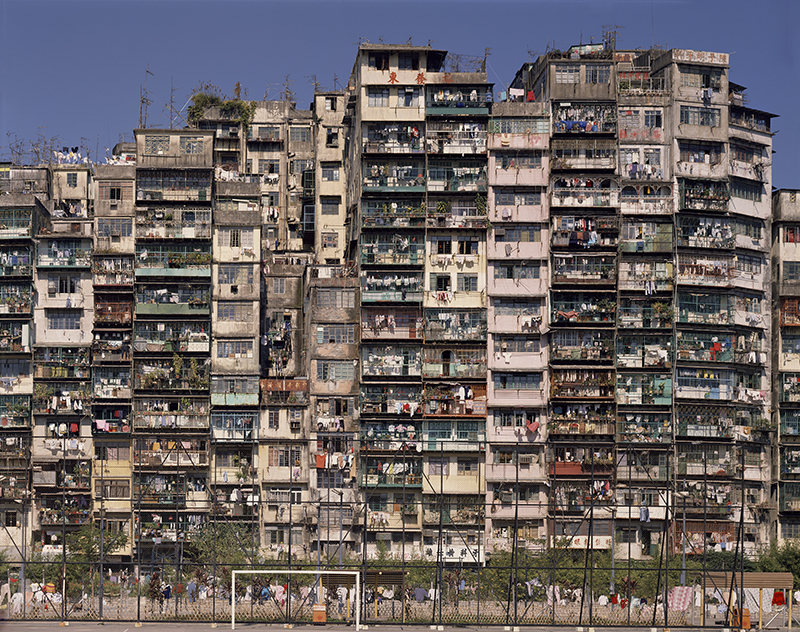
A playground at the edge of the city

In response to difficult living conditions, residents formed a tightly knit community, helping one another endure various hardships. Within families, wives often did housekeeping, while grandmothers cared for their grandchildren and other children from surrounding households. The city's rooftops were important gathering places, especially for residents who lived on upper floors. Parents used them to relax, and children would play or do homework there after school.

The yamen in the heart of the city was also a major social centre, a place for residents to talk, have tea or watch television, and to take classes such as calligraphy. The Old People's Centre also held religious meetings for Christians and others. Other religious institutions included the Fuk Tak and Tin Hau temples, which were used for a combination of Buddhist, Taoist, and animist practices.

== Current status as a park ==
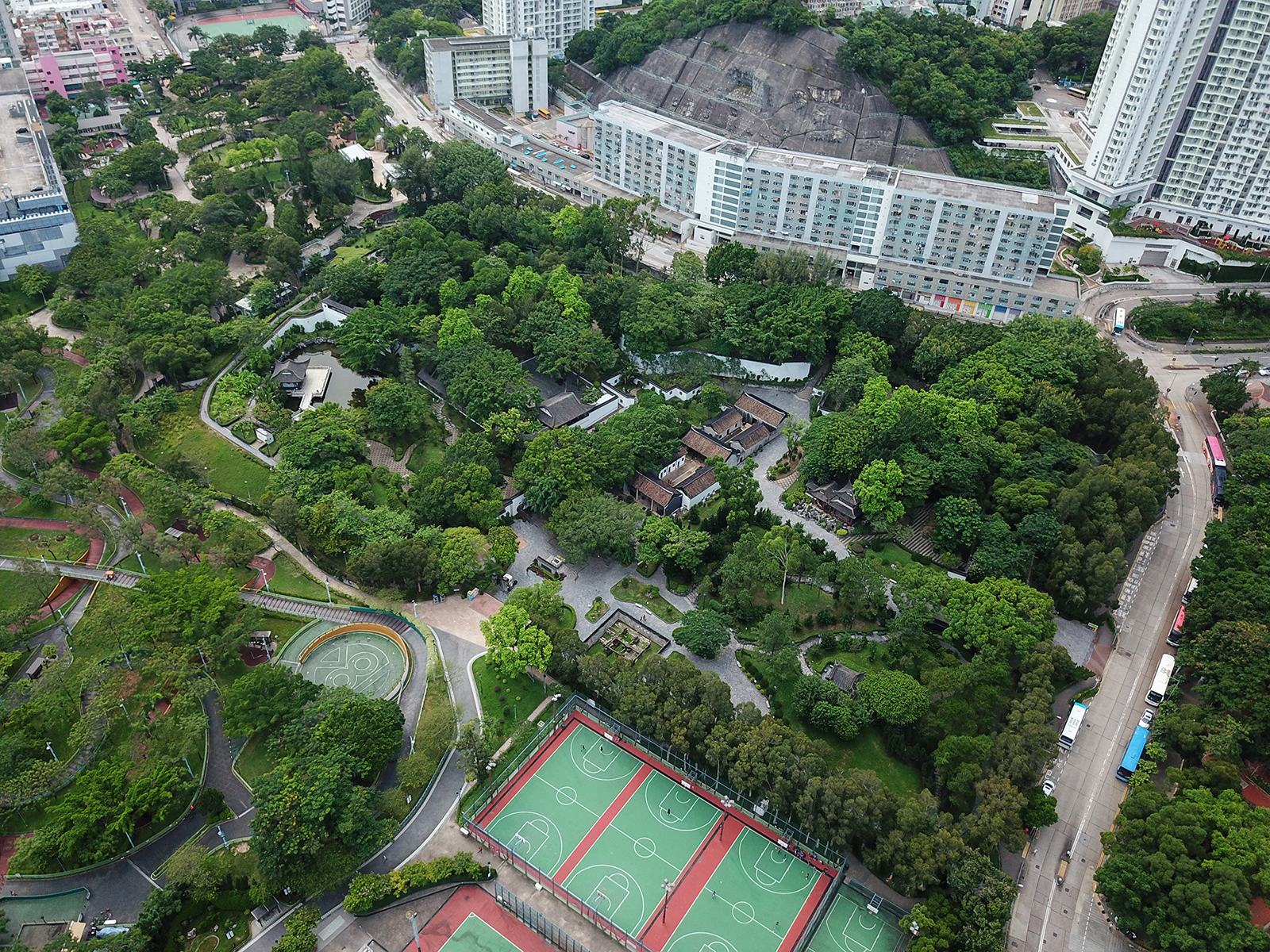
Aerial view of Kowloon Walled City Park

=== Design and construction ===
The area where the walled city once stood is now Kowloon Walled City Park, adjacent to Carpenter Road Park. The 31,000 m^{2} (330,000 ft^{2}; 7.7 acres) park was completed in August 1995 and handed over to the Urban Council. It was opened officially by Governor Chris Patten a few months later on 22 December. Construction of the park cost a total of HK$76 million.

The park's design is modelled on Jiangnan gardens of the early Qing dynasty. It is divided into eight landscape features, with the fully restored yamen as its centrepiece. The park's paths and pavilions are named after streets and buildings in the walled city. Artefacts from the walled city, such as five inscribed stones and three old wells, are also on display in the park. The park was designed by the Architectural Services Department, which won a "prestigious award" from the Central Society of Horticulture of Germany for the redevelopment.

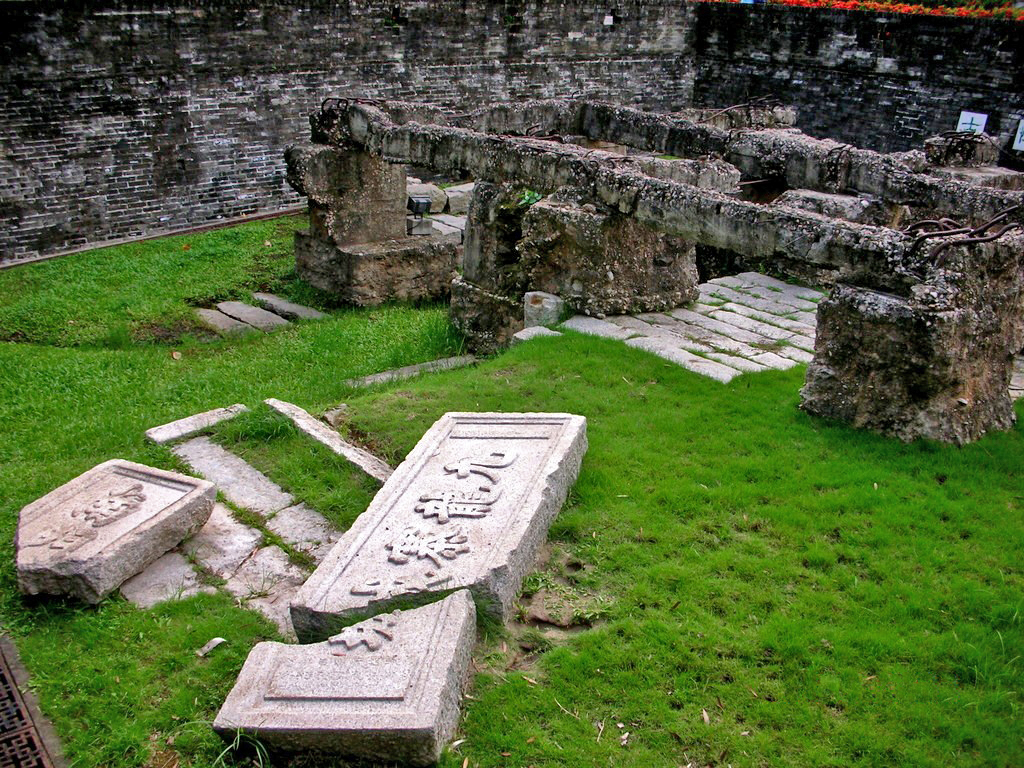
The remnants of the city's South Gate and its entrance plaque

=== Declared monuments ===
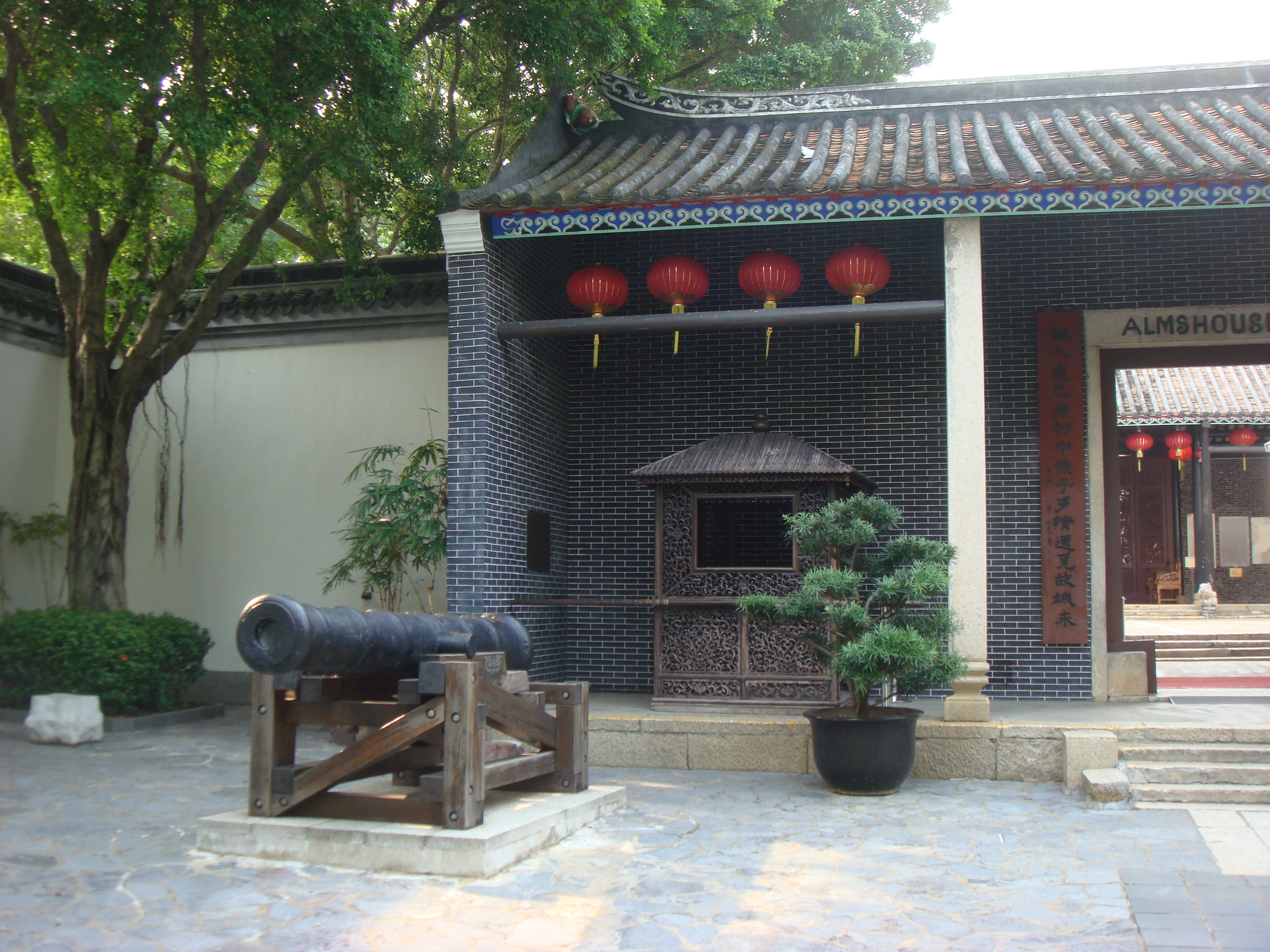
The front of the restored yamen building with one of the original cannons

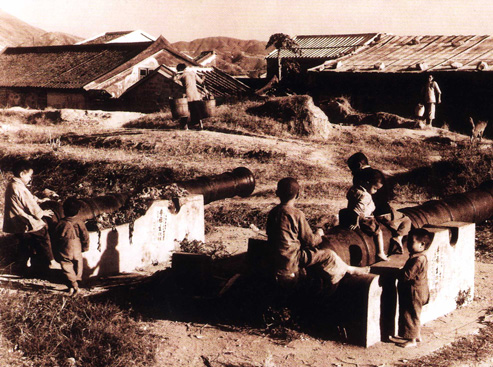
Children of early 20th-century Kowloon Walled City residents playing on the yamen cannons

The Antiquities and Monuments Office conducted archaeological examinations as the walled city was being demolished, and several cultural remains were discovered. Among them were the walled city's yamen and remnants of its South Gate, which were officially designated declared monuments of Hong Kong on 4 October 1996.

The South Gate had originally served as the walled city's main entrance. Along with its foundation, other remains included two stone plaques inscribed with "South Gate" and "Kowloon Walled City" from the South Gate and a flagstone path that had led up to it. The foundations of the city's wall and East Gate were also discovered. The Hong Kong government preserved the South Gate remnants next to a square in front of the yamen.

The yamen building is made up of three halls. Originally the middle hall served the Assistant Magistrate of Kowloon's administrative office, and the rear block was his residence. After the government officials left the area in 1899, it was used for several other purposes, including an old people's home, a refuge for widows and orphans, a school, and a clinic. It was restored in 1996 and is now found near the centre of the park. It contains a photo gallery of the walled city, and two cannons dating back to 1802 sit at the sides of its entrance.

== Cultural memory ==
The Walled City of Kowloon has no visible wall around it, but it is as clearly defined as if there were one made of hard, high steel. It is instantly sensed by the congested open market that runs along the street in front of the row of dark run-down flats—shacks haphazardly perched on top of one another giving the impression that at any moment the entire blighted complex will collapse under its own weight, leaving nothing but rubble where elevated rubble had stood.

— Robert Ludlum, The Bourne Supremacy, p. 149

A lack of governance, and separation from Hong Kong, provided a distinct culture in the city. Crime and corruption were common; the police were known to co-operate with the triads operating in the city. During the 1970s greater police presence reduced crime and the city became home to those seeking to avoid business regulation and taxes.

While the city was shunned in its early existence, it has since become a source of pride for many Hong Kong residents. The rising publicity around Hong Kong following the 1997 handover sparked a re-emergence in the public interest of Kowloon Walled City and its disappearance. Popular memory tends to sanitise the city, forgetting the crime and corruption. The city has begun to be portrayed with a romantic dystopian identity, and many forms of modern media have borrowed the city's culture in their works. It serves as an inspiration for fictional hive-like cities as seen in various forms of media.

=== Literature ===
A few of the people who spent time in Kowloon Walled City have written accounts of their experiences. Evangelist Jackie Pullinger wrote a 1989 memoir, Crack in the Wall, about her involvement in treating drug addicts within the walled city. In his 2004 autobiography Gweilo, Martin Booth describes his exploration of the walled city as a child in the 1950s. Gordon Jones, a District Officer of Kowloon City District at the time, also published his recollections of the city during his time in office.

Hive of dream. Those mismatched, uncalculated windows. How they seemed to absorb all the frantic activity of Kai Tak airport, sucking in energy like a black hole.

— William Gibson, "Disneyland with the Death Penalty"

Robert Ludlum's novel The Bourne Supremacy uses the walled city as one of its settings. The city appears as a virtual reality environment (described by Steven Poole as an "oasis of political and creative freedom") in William Gibson's Bridge trilogy, and as a favourable contrast with Singapore in his Wired article "Disneyland with the Death Penalty".

Chloe Gong's 2023 adult fantasy novel Immortal Longings draws inspiration from the walled city for its setting. Sunyi Dean's 2026 adult fantasy novel The Girl with a Thousand Faces uses the walled city as it was in 1975 as one of its main settings.

=== Films and television ===
The 1982 Shaw Brothers film Brothers from the Walled City is set in Kowloon Walled City. The 1984 gangster film Long Arm of the Law features the walled city as a refuge for gang members before they are gunned down by police. In the 1988 film Bloodsport, starring Jean-Claude Van Damme, the walled city is the setting for a martial arts tournament. The 1992 non-narrative film Baraka features several highly detailed shots of the walled city shortly before its demolition. The 1993 film Crime Story starring Jackie Chan was partly filmed in the deserted walled city, and includes real scenes of building explosions.

A walled neighbourhood of Gotham City called the Narrows in the 2005 film Batman Begins was inspired by the walled city. The 2006 Hong Kong horror film Re-cycle features a decrepit, nightmarish version of the walled city, complete with tortured souls from which the protagonist must flee. The 2016 TVB martial arts drama A Fist Within Four Walls takes place in the triad-ridden walled city in the early 1960s. The 2024 Hong Kong action crime film Twilight of the Warriors: Walled In, an adaptation of the manhua City of Darkness by Andy Seto, sets its location and plot premise in Kowloon Walled City during the 1980s. In The Legend of Korra, it served as the aesthetic basis for representing the Lower Ring of Ba Sing Se.

=== Anime and manga ===
In the manga Crying Freeman, the titular character's wife travels to the walled city to master her swordsmanship and control a cursed sword. The manga Blood+: Kowloon Nights uses the walled city as the setting for a series of murders. The later part of episode 3 and episode 4 of the anime Street Fighter II V are set in Kowloon Walled City, depicted as a dark and lawless area where Ryu, Ken and Chun-Li have to fight for their lives at every turn, being rescued by the police once they reach the walled city's limits. The manga and anime Kowloon Generic Romance is also set in the walled city.

=== Video games ===
Kowloon Walled City is depicted in several games, including Kowloon's Gate and Shenmue II. The game Stranglehold, a sequel to the film Hard Boiled, features a version of the walled city filled with hundreds of Triad members. In the games Fear Effect and Fear Effect 2, photographs of the walled city were used as inspiration "for moods, camera angles and lighting". Concept art for the MMORPG Guild Wars Factions depicts massive, densely packed structures inspired by the walled city. The pen-and-paper RPG Shadowrun and CRPG Shadowrun: Hong Kong include a crime-ridden, rebuilt version of the Walled City set in 2056. The walled city also features in the 2010 game Call of Duty: Black Ops. The 2022 video game Stray's environment is influenced by the walled city as well.

=== Buildings and venues ===
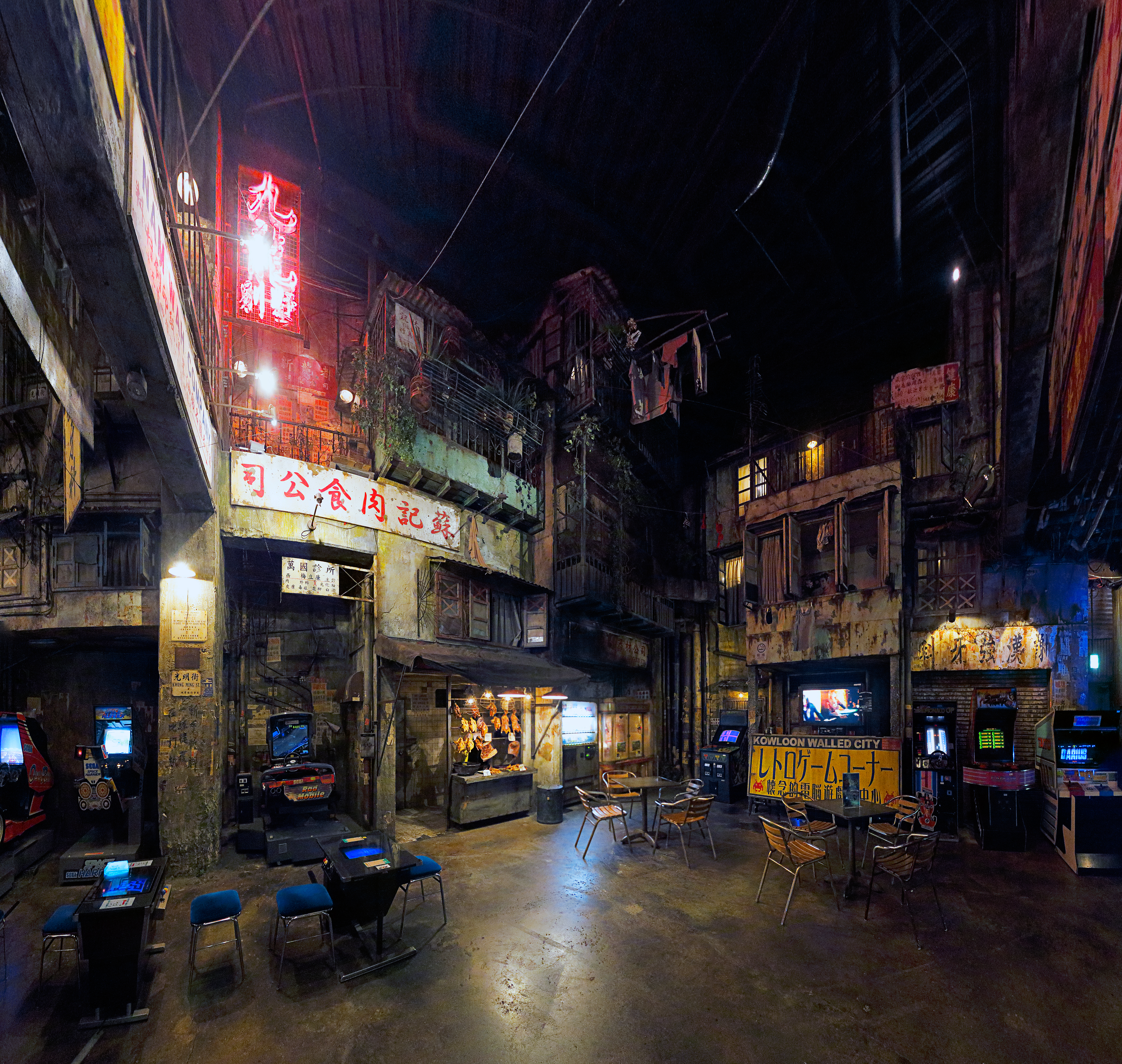
Warehouse Kawasaki, a former Japanese game arcade with a Kowloon Walled City theme

A partial recreation of Kowloon Walled City existed in the Warehouse Kawasaki, an amusement arcade that operated from 2009 to 2019 in the Japanese suburb of Kawasaki, Kanagawa. The atmosphere of the walled city was reflected in the arcade's narrow corridors, electrical wires, pipes, postboxes, sign boards, neon lights, frayed posters, and various other small touches.

A livehouse inspired by the Walled City opened its doors in Shibuya, Tokyo in December 2021. Known as the Shibuya Kinmirai Kaikan (渋谷近未来会館), the venue hired Hong Kong artists to spray paint Cantonese graffiti on its walls to give an air of authenticity along with neon lights and posters.

The Chinese catering brand Wenheyou runs multi-storey retro-themed restaurant buildings in Changsha and Shenzhen that have been likened to the Kowloon Walled City, with some media outlets calling them either inspired by or even "1:1 recreations" of the city. A branch existed in Guangzhou until it closed in February 2025.

== See also ==
- Centro Financiero Confinanzas, an abandoned skyscraper in Caracas, Venezuela populated in a similar manner
- Chungking Mansions, the unusual atmosphere of the building is sometimes compared to Kowloon Walled City
- Dharavi, a densely populated community within Mumbai which has developed a similar localised economy and unplanned infrastructure system.
- Kamagasaki in Osaka, Japan
- Ras Khamis, a neighbourhood in East Jerusalem that also has unplanned highrise construction due to uncertain political jurisdiction
- Shibam in eastern Yemen, nicknamed "the oldest skyscraper city in the world", resembles Kowloon Walled City in manner of urban planning.
- Treasure Hill, formerly an illegal settlement in Taipei founded by Chinese Nationalist military veterans at the end of the 1940s
