= Yamen =

Residences of bureaucrats in imperial China

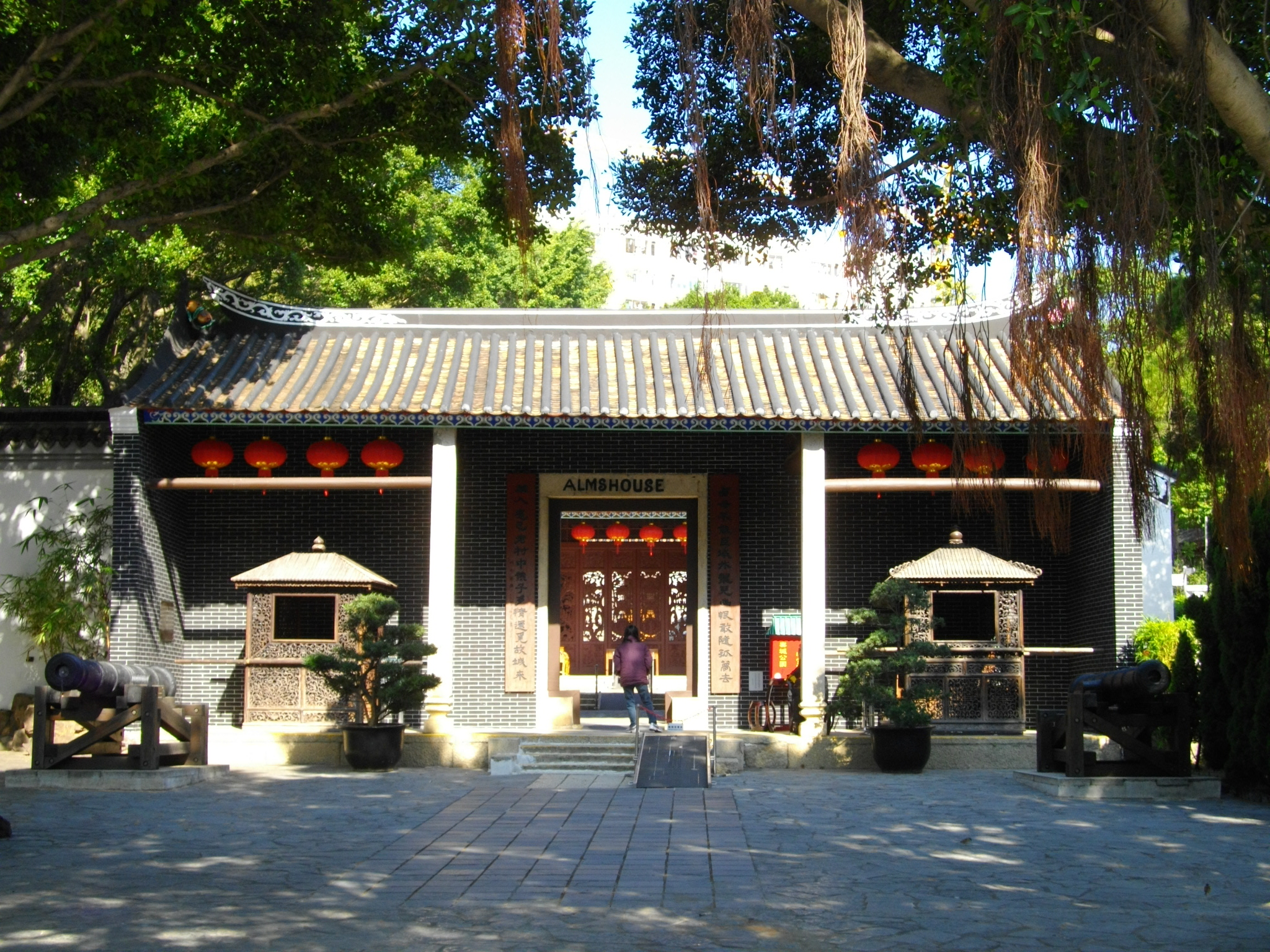
- The former yamen in Kowloon Walled City Park, Hong Kong.

Chinese name
- Traditional Chinese: 衙門 / 牙門 / 官衙
- Simplified Chinese: 衙门 / 牙门 / 官衙
Transcriptions
Standard Mandarin
- Hanyu Pinyin: yámén / guānyá
Yue: Cantonese
- Jyutping: nga4 mun4
Southern Min
- Hokkien POJ: Gê-mn̂g / koaⁿ-gê

Vietnamese name
- Vietnamese alphabet: Quan nha / Nha môn
- Chữ Hán: 官衙 / 衙門 / 牙門

Korean name
- Hangul: 관아
- Hanja: 官衙
Transcriptions
- Revised Romanization: gwana
- McCune–Reischauer: kwana

Manchu name
- Manchu script: ᠶᠠᠮᡠᠨ
- Möllendorff: yamun

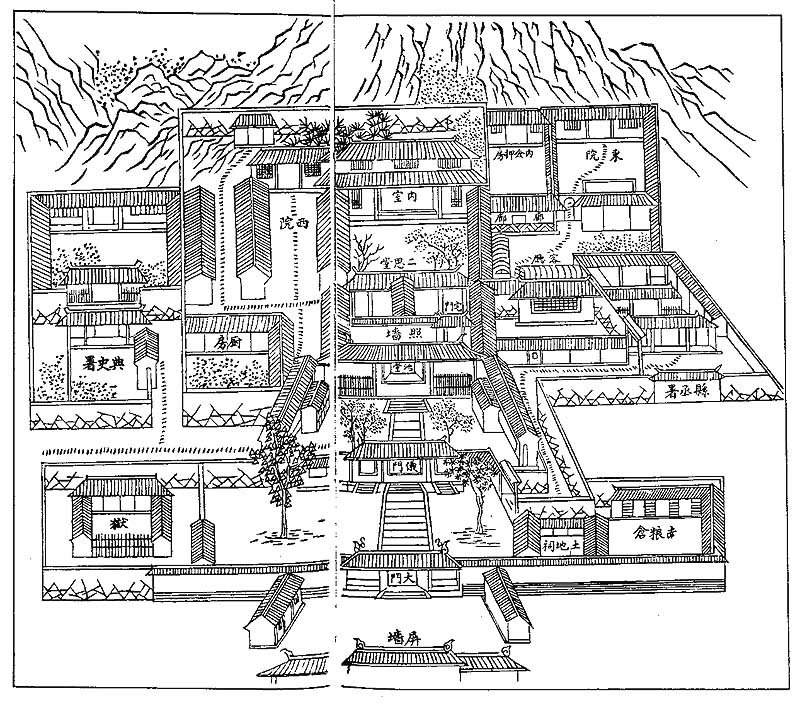
Floor plan of the yamen at Shaoxing Fu, Zhejiang Province, 1803.

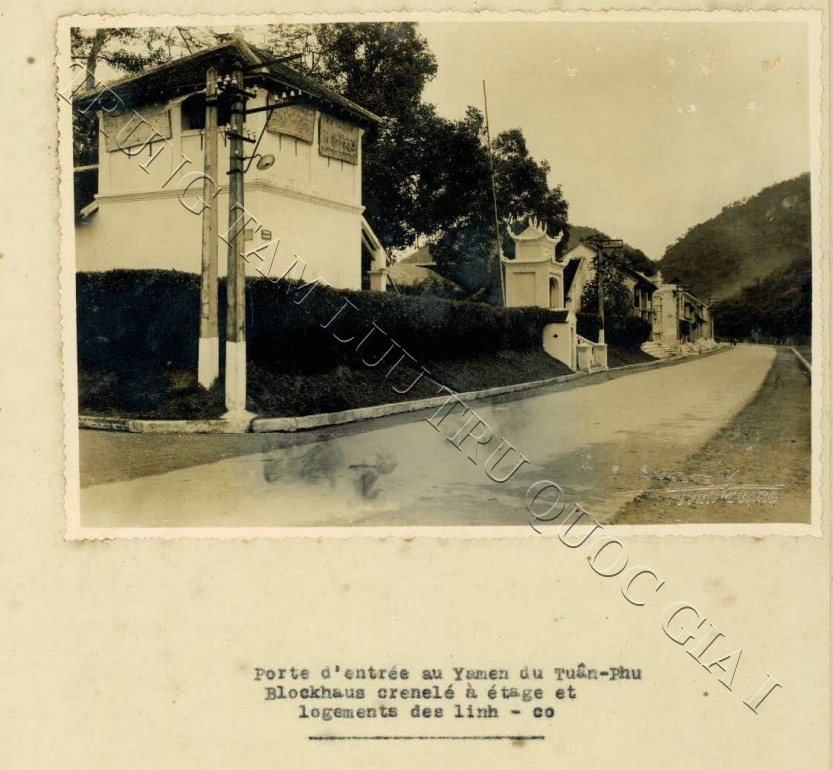
The entry gate of the yamen of the Nguyễn dynasty period Tuần phủ of the Tuyên Quang province and the blockhaus of the lính cơ in Tuyên Quang, Tonkin, French Indochina.

A yamen (traditional Chinese: 衙門; simplified Chinese: 衙门; pinyin: yámén; IPA: [jǎ.mə̌n]) (Note: Manchu: ᠶᠠᠮᡠᠨ yamun) was the administrative office or residence of a local bureaucrat or mandarin in imperial China, Korea, and Vietnam. A yamen can also be any governmental office or body headed by a mandarin, at any level of government: the offices of one of the Six Ministries is a yamen, but so is a prefectural magistracy. The term has been widely used in China for centuries, but appeared in English during the Qing dynasty.

== Overview ==
Within a local yamen, the bureaucrat administered the government business of the town or region. Typical responsibilities of the bureaucrat include local finance, capital works, judging of civil and criminal cases, and issuing decrees and policies.

Typically, the bureaucrat and his immediate family would live in a residence attached to the yamen. This was especially so during the Qing dynasty, when imperial law forbade a person from taking government office in his native province.

Yamens varied greatly in size depending on the level of government they administered, and the seniority of the bureaucrat's office. However, a yamen at a local level typically had similar features: a front gate, a courtyard and a hall (typically serving as a court of law); offices, prison cells and store rooms; and residences for the bureaucrat, his family and his staff.

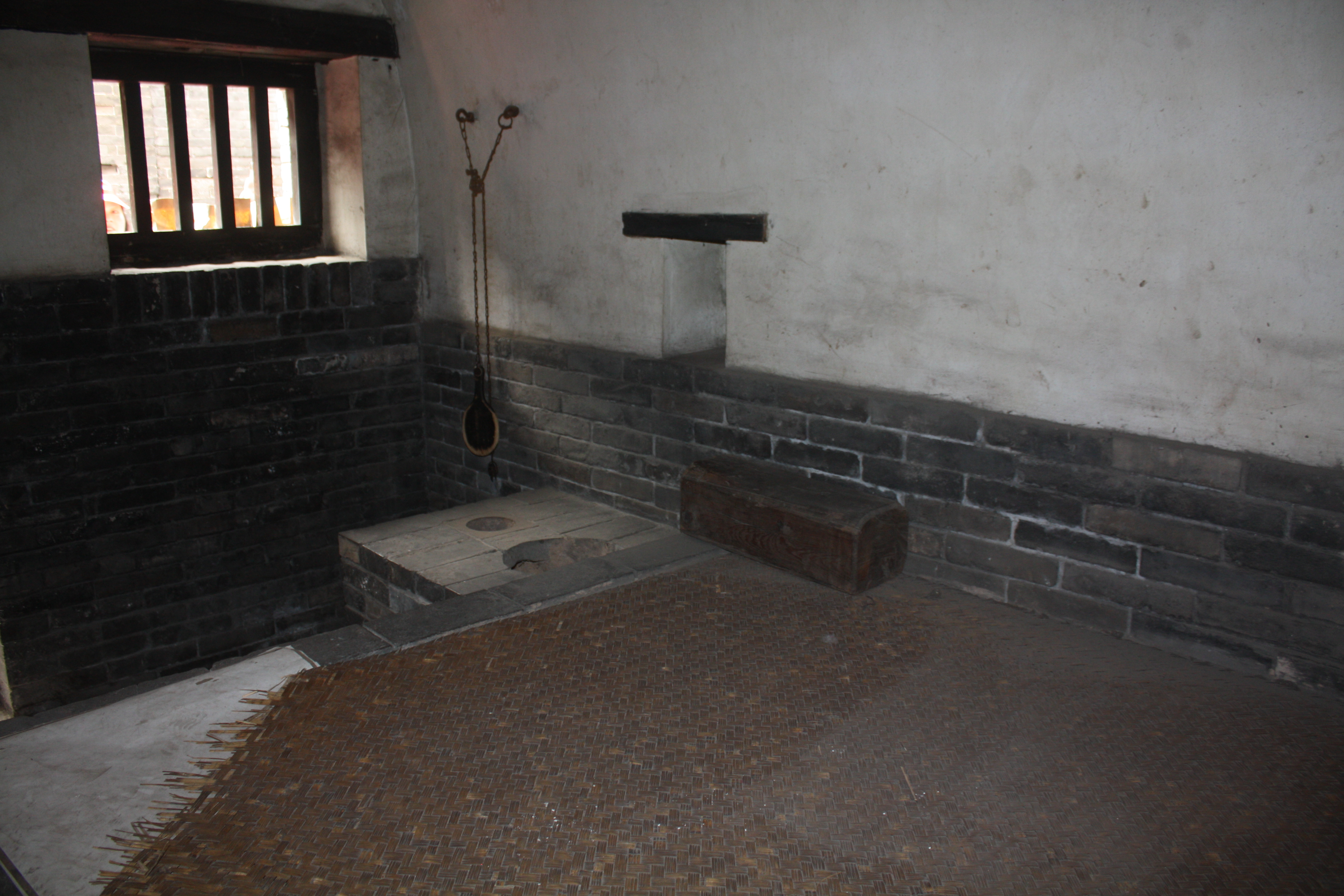
A prison cell in the former Pingyao yamen

At the provincial level and above, specialisation among officials occurred to a greater extent. For example, the three chief officials of a province (simplified Chinese: 三大宪; traditional Chinese: 三大憲; pinyin: Sàn Dà Xiàn; lit. 'the Three Great Laws') controlled the legislative and executive, the judicial, and the military affairs of the province or region. Their yamen would therefore be specialised according to the functions of the office. The great yamens of the central government, located in the capital, are more exclusively office complexes.

== The yamen runner in the Ming dynasty ==
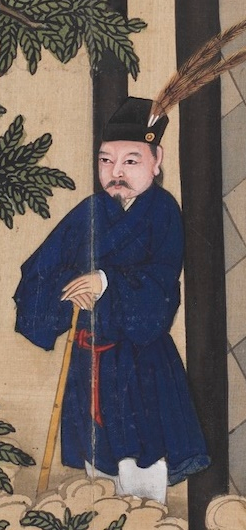
A Ming dynasty yamen runner.

=== General ===
Yamen runner (衙役) is an occupation which served for yamen, the law enforcement department in ancient China. They worked as the lowest class in the government department which made them a bridge between the common people and the government.

=== Classification ===
There were three kinds of yamen runner, zao (皂), zhuang (壮), kuai (快). But in fact, there were more different kinds in specific. Zao usually served around the court, zhuang provided physical labor and kuai were in charge of inspection, investigation, and arrest.

==== Zao ====
Zao acted as the officials' bodyguards. They usually followed behind the officials. During the trial, they would stand on both sides of the court to maintain order. They also performed the duties of escorting the prisoner, questioning the suspect and applying minor punishment. They had their own black uniform.

==== Zhuang ====
Zhuang were comparable to modern security guards. Their main job was to guard the critical areas such as castle gates, the court, prison, and warehouse. They also patrolled on the streets. Most of them were picked from among strong civilians.

==== Kuai ====
Kuai's duties included summoning defendants and witnesses to the court. They were usually asked to do the trips for the court, traveling long distances if necessary. During the tax season, they would be sent to remote areas to collect for the government. Therefore, Kuai had more contact with civilians than zao and zhuang. They didn't have their own uniform, but were required to hang a card on the waist belt to identify themselves.

=== Social status ===
In the Ming Dynasty, due to their duties, yamen runners were considered as a debased class (jianmin, 贱民), which is even lower than good commoners (liangmin, 良民) such as farmers. It is the lowest stratum in society.

=== Income ===
The salary provided by the court for the yamen runner was low compared to other jobs. The average daily salary was enough for only one meal.

While the salary was not enough to live or raise a family on, working for the law enforcement department gave yamen runners some power that could be taken advantage of. The runners would charge a small fee from the litigants to cover the expenses. The prefects and magistrates acquiesced such a charging system as long as the amount is in a reasonable range. The Kuai, however, couldn't contact the litigants in the lawsuit cases. They would ask for money from the other debased classes like butchers and prostitutes. Such unwritten rule is called dirty regulation.(陋规) Therefore, the actual income of the Kuai depended on their place of work; Kuai in large cities could easily collect a lot of money and Kuai in rural areas could be as poor as the homeless.

Such corruption and extortion were rampant during the reign of Xuande Emperor. The prefects and magistrates just turn a deaf ear on their clerks blackmailing the lower classes. Xuande Emperor described them "licentious, greedy, and insatiably exploitative, [or] degenerate and worthless."

=== Path into the occupation ===
Since the social status of yamen runners was low and the income was unstable (usually low), yamen runners were mostly formed by vagrants, especially among Kuai. They were often strong but uneducated.

== Paper yamen runner ==
A paper yamen runner (纸皂) is a piece of paper on which a yamen runner was drawn, and upon which is recorded an accusation or tax liability, as well as a demand for the recipient to appear in court or pay the tax. The prefects and magistrates issued this to the litigants or tax defaulters in the hope that they would voluntarily appear in court or pay tax in arrears. It's unclear when the paper yamen runner was created, but literature about it can be found during the Ming and Qing dynasties.

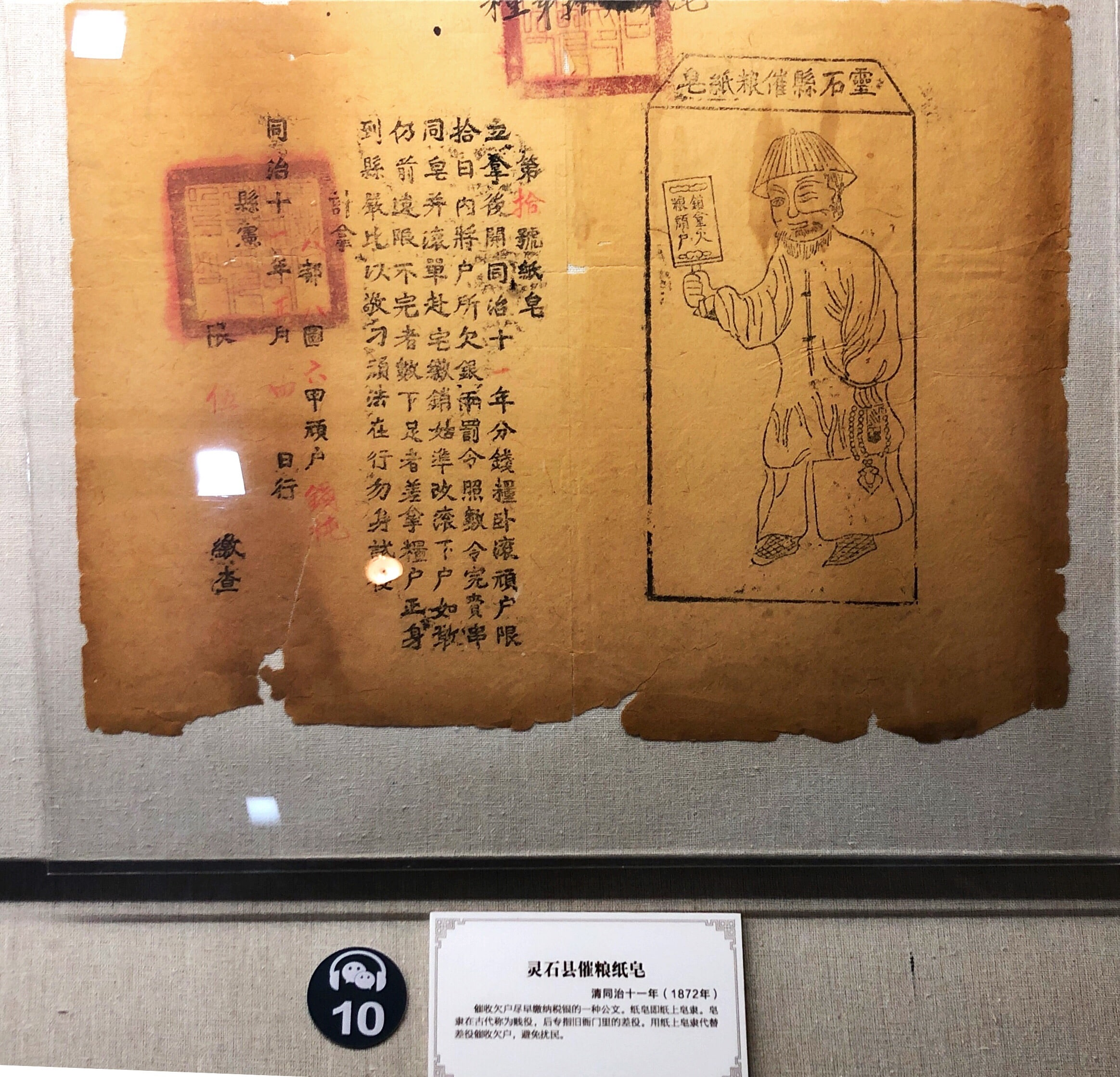
Paper yamen runner demanding tax defaulters to pay tax

Because it was tempting for yamen runners to take unlawful advantage of their position, magistrates would occasionally allow plaintiffs to take litigants to the court first. If a plaintiff failed to do so, the magistrate would issue a paper yamen runner. Only if both methods failed would an actual yamen runner be sent to arrest the litigant. In this way, fewer yamen runners were required. Such practices were typically employed only for mild crimes, however. For serious crimes such as murder, theft, gambling, and fights, the magistrate would still send yamen runners directly for the arrest.

== After 1911 ==
The institution of the yamen fell victim to the Wuchang Uprising and the Xinhai Revolution, after which warlords often became the ultimate authorities, in spite of Sun Yat-sen's best efforts to establish a Republic of China covering all of China. Sun Yat-sen tried to establish a form of self-government, or home rule, on a regional (or local) basis, but he found that he needed bureaucracy to run a country as big as China. Hence, new bureaucratic offices arose, thus replicating the functions of the Imperial yamens in many ways.

The term yamen is still used in colloquial Chinese today, however, to denote government offices. It sometimes carries negative connotations of an arrogant or inefficient bureaucracy.

== Notable yamens ==
- The Zongli Yamen acted as an office of foreign affairs in the late Qing dynasty .
- The yamen at Kowloon Walled City, Hong Kong is an important historical site.
- The Presidential Palace in Nanjing was modified from the "yamen" of the Viceroy of Liangjiang.
- The yamen of Neixiang County, in Henan, is the best preserved county-level yamen in mainland China today.
- The yamens of the six imperial Ministries of the Qing dynasty, in Beijing, were located within what is now Tiananmen Square, and were demolished in stages in the early to mid 20th century.
