= Jackie Pullinger =

British missionary (born 1944)

Jackie Pullinger MBE
- Born: 1944 (age 81–82); Croydon, London, England
- Citizenship: Hong Kong
- Education: Royal College of Music, London
- Occupation: Christian missionary
- Known for: Rehabilitation programme for drug addicts
- Notable work: Chasing the Dragon; Crack in the Wall
- Television: The Law of Love
- Spouse: John To (married 1992-1999; his death)
- Awards: Honorary degree of Doctor of Social Sciences (HKU)
- Website: www.ststephenssociety.com

Jacqueline Bryony Lucy ‘Jackie’ Pullinger MBE (born 1944) is a British Protestant Christian charismatic missionary to Hong Kong and founder of the St Stephen's Society. She has been ministering in Hong Kong since 1966. The early years of her Hong Kong ministry are chronicled in the book Chasing the Dragon (1980).

== History ==
Pullinger graduated from the Royal College of Music in London having specialized in the oboe. At the age of 22 she wanted to be a missionary, so she wrote to various missionary organizations. Unable to find support from missionary organizations, she then sought advice from Richard Thomson, a minister. At first she wanted to go to Africa, but then she had a dream that impressed upon her the idea of going to Hong Kong. She followed the vicar's advice and went to Hong Kong by boat in 1966. However, when she arrived she knew no one there and had only $10 on hand. The only reason the immigration officers allowed her in was that her mother's godson was a police officer there. She found work as a primary school teacher in the Kowloon Walled City, which in the 1960s was not policed and consequently had become one of the world's largest opium producing centres, run by Chinese criminal Triad gangs. Later she established a youth centre that helped the drug addicts and street sleepers inside the walled city. She also taught music at St. Stephen's Girls' College.

== St Stephen's Society ==
In 1981, Pullinger started a charity called the St Stephen's Society which provided rehabilitation homes for recovering drug addicts, sex workers, and gang members. By December 2007 it housed 200 people. The charity's work was recognized by the Hong Kong government, which donated the land for the rehabilitation homes. The work continues.

== Published works ==
- Jackie Pullinger; Andrew Quicke (1 September 1980). Chasing the Dragon. Hodder & Stoughton Religious. ISBN 978-0340908808.
- Jackie Pullinger; Nick Danzigerp (1 May 1989). Crack in the Wall. Hodder & Stoughton Religious. ISBN 978-0340490679.
