= Kowloon Walled City Park =

Park on historic site in Hong Kong

- 九龍寨城公園
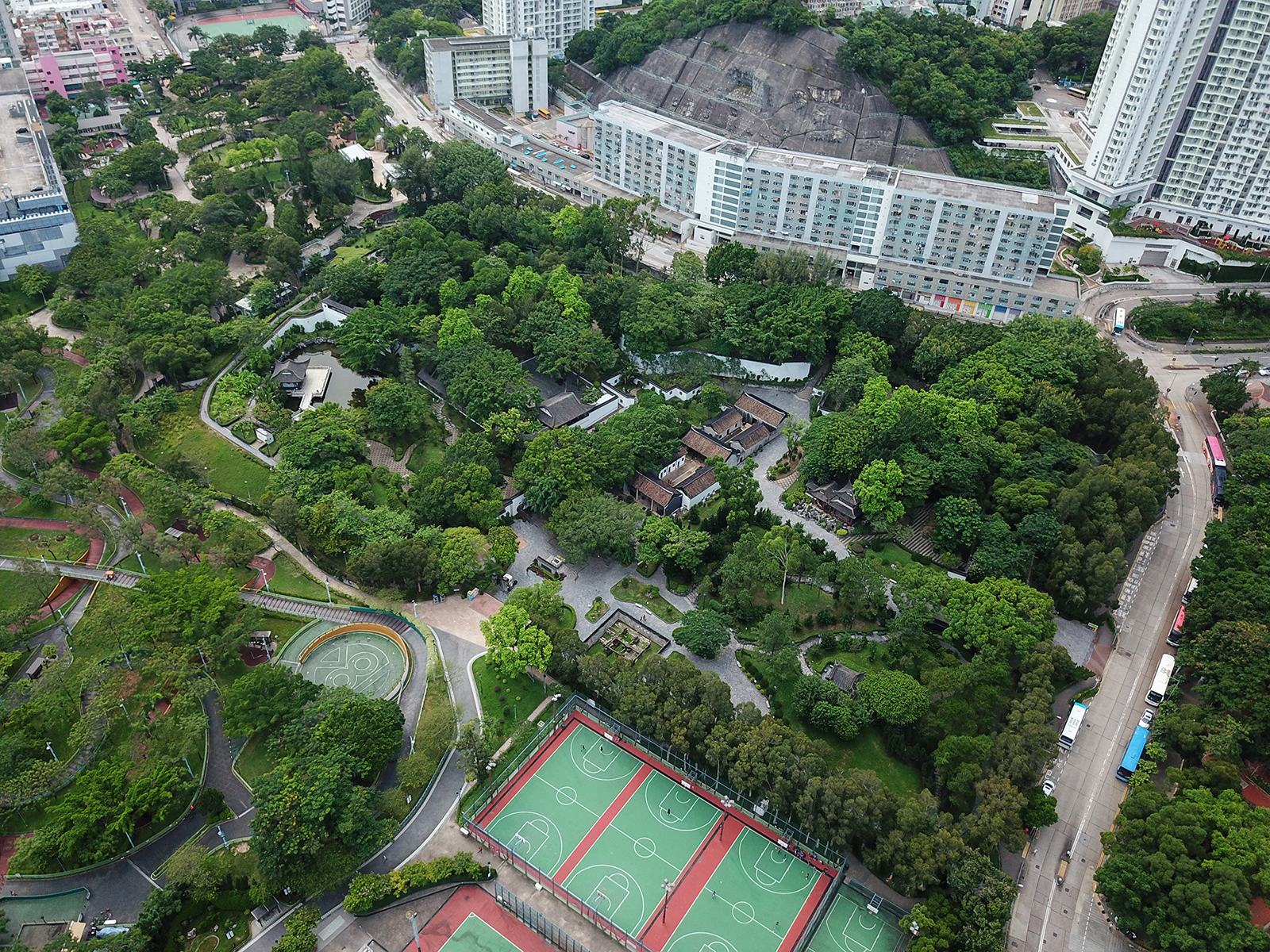
- An aerial view of the Kowloon Walled City Park in 2018
- Interactive map of Kowloon Walled City Park
- Location: Kowloon City, Kowloon
- Coordinates: 22°19′55″N 114°11′24″E
- Area: 7.66 acres (3.10 hectares)
- Opened: 22 December 1995; 30 years ago
- Operator: Leisure and Cultural Services Department
- Open: Year round

Kowloon Walled City Park
- Traditional Chinese: 九龍寨城公園
Transcriptions
Yue: Cantonese
- Yale Romanization: Gáu lùhng jaaih sìhng gūng yùhn
- Jyutping: Gau2 lung4 zaai6 sing4 gung1 jyun4

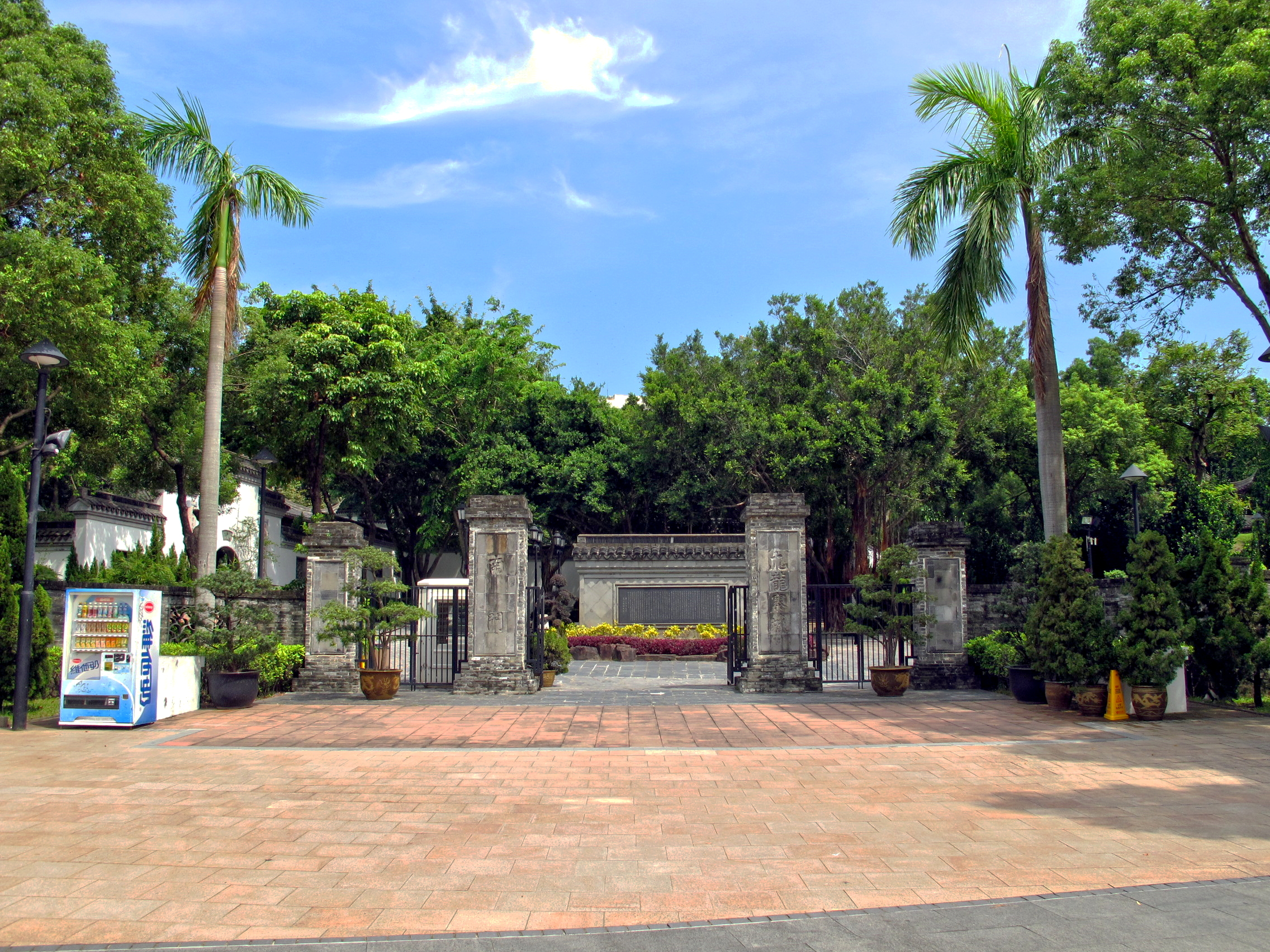
Main entrance

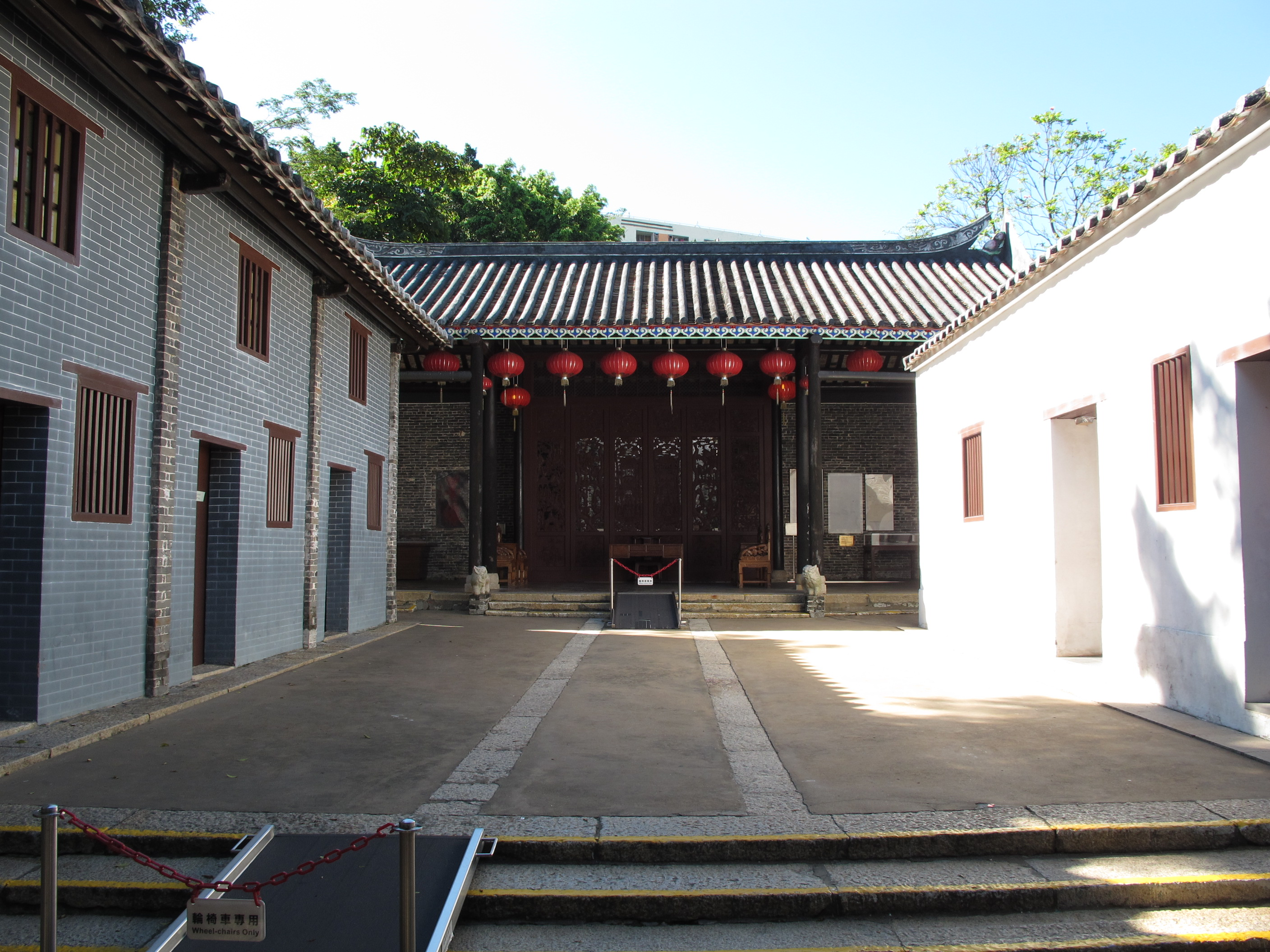
Historic yamen building

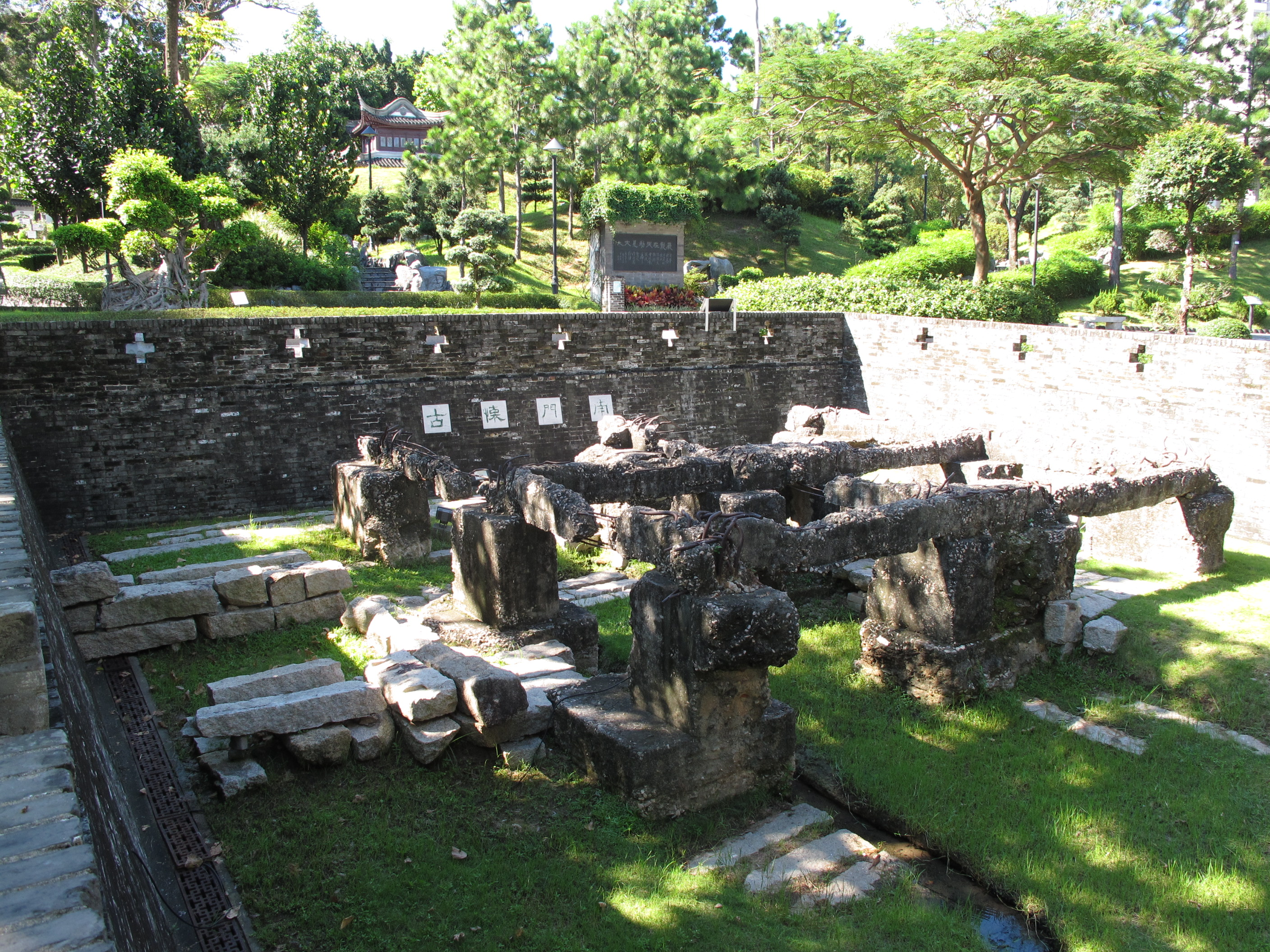
Archaeological remains of the South Gate

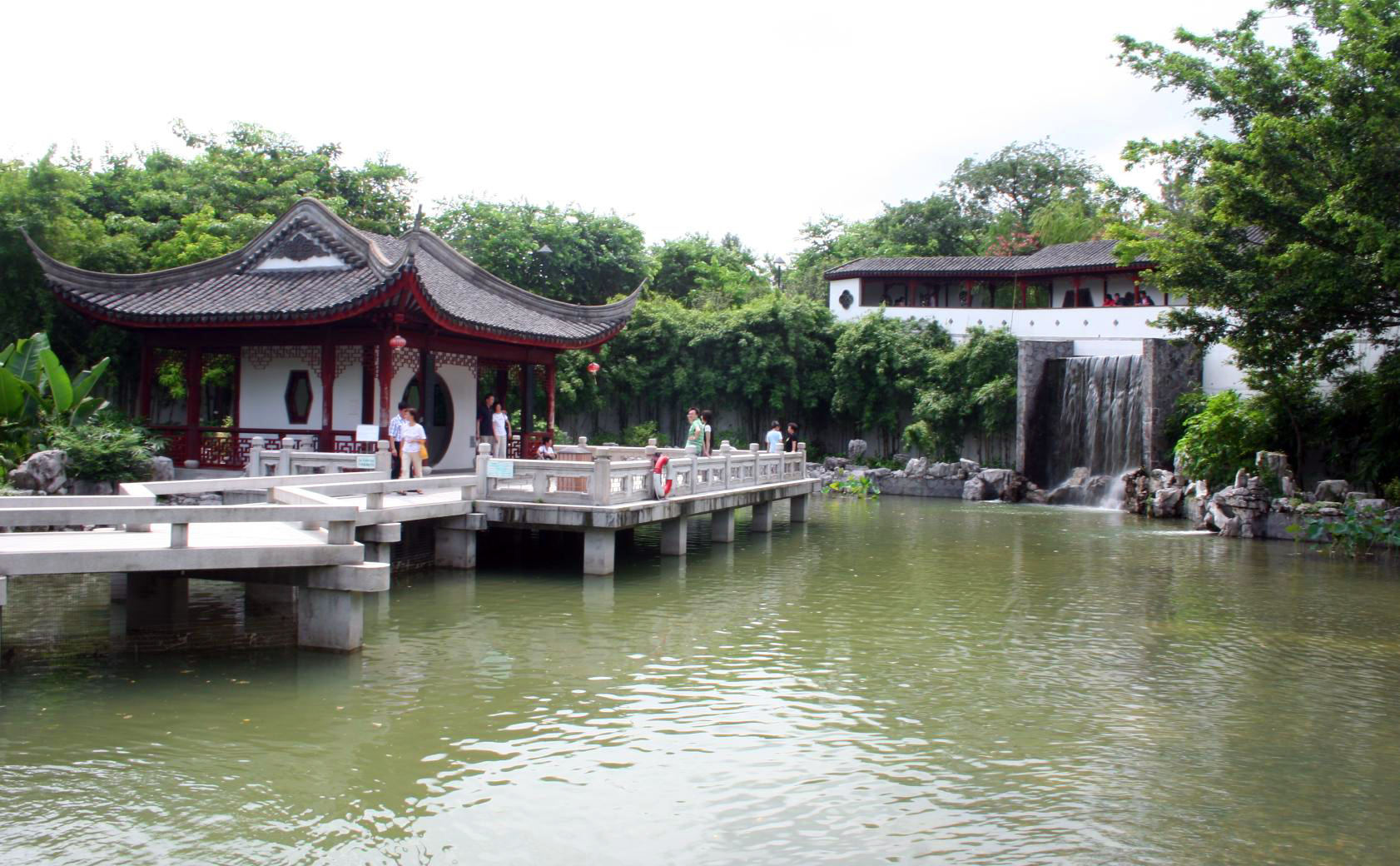
Lung Nam Pavilion

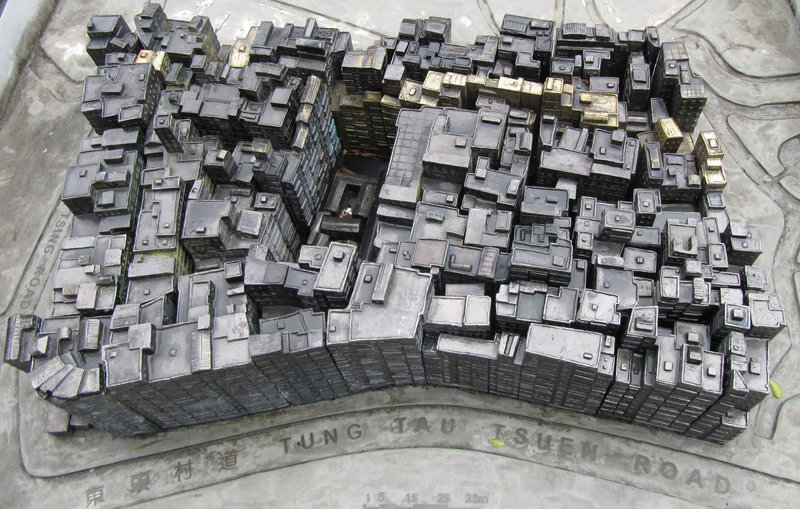
Model of the former Kowloon Walled City slum located near the South Gate entrance

The Kowloon Walled City Park is a park in Kowloon City, Kowloon, Hong Kong. The Kowloon Walled City had been a military stronghold since the 15th century due to its coastal location and was a slum. Under an agreement between the Government of Hong Kong and the People's Republic of China, the Kowloon Walled City was demolished in the 1990s. Some historic buildings and features were preserved for incorporation into the new park.

The Kowloon Walled City Park is designed resembling a Jiangnan garden of the early Qing dynasty. The park, 31,000 square metres (7.66 acres) in total, is divided into eight theme zones with their own characteristic scenery, matching with the style of the whole park. The design was awarded a Diploma at the IGO Stuttgart Expo 93 (International Garden Exposition).

== History ==
In the middle of the 19th century, the Qing government started to build an enclave beside Kowloon Bay, surrounded by stone walls. The Kowloon Walled City was initially used for military purposes, housing many soldiers and their families. During World War II, the stone walls were demolished by the Imperial Japanese Army. Part of them were buried and well preserved under the soil. By the 1970s, the population of the city had risen to 41,000. The number of buildings was 503 in 1994. By that time, the British colonial government found it increasingly difficult to manage and control the serious crime in the area related to drugs, illegal gambling, prostitution and quackery. Domestic factories, including textile, candy-making and production of jook-sing noodles, were situated in the area. After the Sino-British Joint Declaration in 1984, Britain and China embarked on a discussion about solving the problems in the Walled City, and subsequently announced its demolition on 14 January 1987. Between 1987 and 1989 residents were resettled, and demolition began in 1993.

By 1995 the site had been transformed into a park for nearby residents. Due to its proximity to the Kai Tak Airport, and so that the park could have a more open view, regulation of the height of buildings was strictly enforced.

== Featured facilities ==
The park consists mainly of eight landscape features: the Yamen (衙府), Old South Gate (南門), Eight Floral Walks (八徑異趣), Garden of Four Seasons (四季同馨 – 廣蔭庭), Garden of Chinese Zodiac (生肖倩影 – 童樂苑), Chess Garden (棋壇比弈遊弈園), Mountain View Pavilion (邀山樓) as well as the Fei Sing Pavilion (魁星半亭) and Guibi Rock (歸璧石).

The Yamen (衙府) is located in the centre of the Park and is the only remaining old Qing building. It was built in 1847; its interior was dominated by the offices of the Commodore of the Dapeng Brigade (大鵬協府) and the Kowloon Assistant Military Inspectorate (九龍巡檢司衙署). It was designed with three rows and four wings of houses. Its walls and column bases are built from bricks and granite, while the roof is a traditional structure covered with cylindrical and flat tiles. After 1899 the Yamen was used for charitable purposes, like housing elderly. It is now officially classified as a declared monument in Hong Kong. Six exhibition rooms are housed inside.

The original site of the South Gate (南門) has been designated as a declared monument and all related relics unearthed have been preserved. Flagstone pavement, cornerstones of the buildings, and a drain were discovered. Also, two granite plaques with Chinese characters for "South Gate" and "Kowloon Walled City" were unearthed at the site of the original gate when the Walled City was torn down in 1994.

The Garden features 12 Chinese zodiac sculptures. They are arranged according to the Heavenly Stems and Earthly Branches in Chinese astrology.

The Guibi Rock was carved from Taihu stone. It is named Guibi because its veins are similar to those of ancient jade. Fui Sing Pavilion symbolises a constellation of literature and wisdom. Guibi Rock also symbolises the hope of returning Hong Kong to China.

The Mountain View Pavilion provides a view of the Lion Rock, which resembles a lion sitting with its head facing the Pavilion.

There are four large chessboards built on the ground with pebbles for visitors to enjoy a game of chess.

Located to the west of Yamen, the Kwong Yam Square is a garden where flowers of the four seasons could be seen.

Since April 2009 there also is a permanent exhibition in the park about the history of the site. It consists of one outdoor display area and six exhibition rooms, which are located inside the Yamen.

The outdoor display area near the South Gate shows a bronze miniature model of the former Walled City in front of a wall. One side of the wall has an introductory article inscribed, whereas the other side presents a cross-section of the pre-demolished city and a depiction of the daily lives of its residents.

The six exhibition rooms illustrate the living environment inside the Walled City through interactive imagery and sound.
