= List of Blood+ chapters =

The three Blood+ manga series were written and illustrated by different manga artists. In comparing the first volume covers from Blood+, Blood+: Adaigo, and Blood+: Kowloon Nights, one can see that each has a different, and distinct, artistic design while still being based on the basic character designs from the anime series.

This is a complete list of chapters for the three manga series released for Blood+. Blood+ is a fifty-episode anime series produced by Production I.G and Aniplex that originally aired in Japan from October 8, 2005, through September 23, 2006. To lead up the premiere of the series, Production I.G commissioned the creation of three different manga series to tie into the anime. The first manga series, also titled Blood+, and written by Asuka Katsura, is a five-volume series that first premiered in Beans Ace Magazine in July 2005. It covers the same story events as the anime series. Blood+: Adagio was written by Kumiko Suekane. It is a two-volume series that premiered in the September 2005 issue of Shōnen Ace and follows Saya and Hagi's experiences during the Russian Revolution. The third series, Blood+: Kowloon Nights, released in Japan as Blood+ Yakōjōshi (BLOOD+ 夜行城市, Blood+ Nocturnal Castle City), is a single tankōbon series by Hirotaka Kisaragi. It premiered in the September issue of Asuka Ciel. Set in Shanghai, it follows Hagi as he searches for Saya and the complications he must deal with. Unlike the other Blood+ manga adaptations, which are seinen and shōnen works respectively, Blood+: Kowloon Nights is a shōjo manga, particularly of the shōnen-ai (or Boy's Love) genre.

For all three series, the tankōbon volumes were published by Kadokawa Shoten. All three manga adaptations have been licensed for an English language release in North America by Dark Horse Comics.

== Volumes ==
=== Blood+ ===
No.	Original release date	Original ISBN	North American release date	North American ISBN
1	December 26, 2005	978-4-04-713773-8	February 6, 2008	978-1-59307-880-5
"Blood+ 01" (BLOOD+01, "Buraddo Purasu 01"); "Bonus Manga" (おまけまんが, "Omake Manga"); "Message from Chizu Hashii" (特別寄稿: 箸井地図, "Tokubetsu Kikō Hashii Chizu"); Preview of the Blood+: First Kiss novel
2	April 26, 2006	978-4-04-713806-3	May 14, 2008	978-1-59307-935-2
"Blood+ 02" (BLOOD+02, "Buraddo Purasu 02"); "Bonus Manga" (おまけまんが, "Omake Manga")
3	August 26, 2006	978-4-04-713846-9	August 13, 2008	978-1-59307-936-9
"Blood+ 03" (BLOOD+03, "Buraddo Purasu 03"); "Bonus Manga" (おまけまんが, "Omake Manga")
4	December 26, 2006	978-4-04-713884-1	December 10, 2008 (Note: Volume 4 was originally scheduled for a November 12, 2008 release; however, due to a misprint, the volume was recalled and the publication date changed.)	978-1-59582-194-2
"Blood+ 04" (BLOOD+04, "Buraddo Purasu 04"); "Bonus Manga" (おまけまんが, "Omake Manga")
5	April 26, 2007	978-4-04-713916-9	February 11, 2009	978-1-59582-241-3
"Blood+ 05" (BLOOD+05, "Buraddo Purasu 05"); "Afterword" (あとがき, "Atogaki")

=== Blood+: Adagio ===
No.	Original release date	Original ISBN	English release date	English ISBN
1	April 26, 2006	978-4-04-713807-0	May 6, 2009	978-1-59582-276-5
"Blood+ Adagio 1" (BLOOD+AI, "Buraddo Purasu Adājo I"); "Afterword by Seiji Takeda" (あとがき 竹田菁滋, "Atogaki Takeda Seiji")
2	December 26, 2006	978-4-04-713886-5	September 2, 2009	978-1-59582-277-2
"Character Profiles" (登場人物紹介, "Tōjō Jinbutsu Shōkai"); "Blood+ Adagio 2" (BLOOD+AII, "Buraddo Purasu Adājo II"); "Character Sketches by Kumiko Suekane" (スエカネクミコ·キャラクタースケッチ, "Suekane Kumiko Kyarakutā Sukecchi")

=== Blood+: Kowloon Nights ===
No.	Original release date	Original ISBN	English release date	English ISBN
1	April 26, 2006	978-4-04-713810-0	February 3, 2010	978-1-59582-444-8
"First Night" (第一夜, "Dai Ichi Yoru"); "Second Night" (第二夜, "Dai Ni Yoru"); "Third Night" (第三夜, "Dai San Yoru"); "Fourth Night" (第四夜, "Dai Yon Yoru"); "Fifth Night" (第五夜, "Dai Go Yoru"); "Afterword" (あとがき, "Atogaki"); "Kaisetsu ga wari no Purodyūsā Taidan" (解説がわりのプロデューサー対談)
