= List of Yo-kai Watch (2014 TV series) episodes =

A promotional poster for Yo-kai Watch in Japan.

Yo-kai Watch is a Japanese children's anime series produced by OLM and based on the video game of the same name developed by Level-5. The anime was broadcast from January 8, 2014, to March 30, 2018, on TXN and related stations. An English dub, produced by Dentsu Entertainment USA, started airing on the Disney XD channel in the United States on October 5, 2015, Canada's Teletoon and Disney XD Canada on October 10, 2015, and 9Go! in Australia on December 14, 2015. Episodes are split into multiple parts. In Indonesia, this anime also aired on Indosiar in 2016, and on RTV starting March 18, 2021.

Its first opening theme through episode 36 was "Geragerapō no Uta" (ゲラゲラポーのうた; "The Hahaha Song") performed by King Cream Soda (キング・クリームソーダ, Kingu Kurīmusōda), with lyrics written by m.o.v.e's vocalist motsu. An English version of the song was used for the dub, written by Mark Risley & David H. Steinberg, and performed by Peter Michail & Kathryn Lynn, but was replaced by "Yo-Kai Watch featuring Swampy Marsh" by Jeff "Swampy" Marsh & Dan Povenmire. The ending theme up through episode 24 (episode 35 in the English dub) is "Yōkai Taisō Dai-Ichi" (ようかい体操第一; "Yo-kai Exercise No. 1") performed by Dream5 (Melissa Hutchison and Alicyn Packard perform the English version). Beginning with episode 25 (episode 36 in the English dub), the ending theme changed to "Don-Don-Dooby-Zoo-Bah!" (ダン・ダン ドゥビ・ズバー!, Dan Dan Dubi Zubā!) performed by Dream5 and Bully-taichō (Hutchinson, Packard, & Brent Pendergrass for the English version). Episode 37's opening theme was "Matsuribayashi de Geragerapō" (祭り囃子でゲラゲラポー; "Festival Music Laughter") and episode 38's was "Hatsukoitōge de Geragerapō" (初恋峠でゲラゲラポー; "First Love's Pass Laughter), both by King Cream Soda, and have alternated until they were replaced. Episodes 48 and 49 used a unique ending theme "Geragerapō Sōkyoku" (ゲラゲラポー走曲; "Geragerapō Medley") by Yo-kai King Dream Soda (ようかいキング・ドリームソーダ, Yōkai Kingu Dorīmusōda), both King Cream Soda and Dream5 along with Lucky Ikeda. In episode 51, the ending theme changed to "Idol wa Ooh-Nya-Nya no Ken" (アイドルはウーニャニャの件, Aidoru wa Ūnyanya no Ken; "Idols Are a Matter of Ooh-Nya-Nya") performed by an AKB48 subgroup named NyaKB with Pandanoko. The opening theme changed again in episode 63 to King Cream Soda's "Gerappo Dance Train" (ゲラッポ・ダンストレイン, Gerappo Dansu Torein). The ending theme changed in episode 68 to "Yōkai Taisō Dai-Ni" (ようかい体操第二; "Yo-kai Exercise Number Two") by Dream5.

Both the opening and ending themes were changed in episode 77, to mark the beginning of the "second season." The opening theme became "Jinsei Dramatic" (人生ドラマティック, Jinsei Doramatikku; "The Life Dramatic") by King Cream Soda and the ending theme became "Uchū Dance!" (宇宙ダンス!, Uchū Dansu!; "Space Dance!") by Kotori with Stitchbird (コトリ with ステッチバード, Kotori with Sutetchibādo) (Gabriel Brown, Michelle Creber, & Rebecca Soichet for the English version). In episode 102, the opening theme became "Terukuni Jinja no Kumade" (照國神社の熊手; "Rakes of Terukuni Jinja") by King Cream Soda and the ending theme became "Chikyu-jin" (地球人, Chikyūjin; "Earthling") by Kotori with Stitchbird. In episode 130, the opening theme became "You Got a Otomodachi" by King Cream Soda and the ending theme became "Furusato Japon" (ふるさとジャポン) by the idol group LinQ.

To mark the start of the "third season," the opening theme became "Banzai! Aizenkai!" (ばんざい!愛全開!) by King Cream Soda (the English version is "Cheers! Full of Love!" performed by Brown, Kendall Wooding, and Creber) and ending theme became "Torejā" (トレジャー, "Treasure") by LinQ (Creber for the English version). Starting with episode 179, the opening became "Gold...Nanchatte!" (ゴールド...なんちゃって!) by King Cream Soda, and the ending became "HaloChri Dance" (ハロ・クリダンス Haro・Kuri Dansu) by Youbekkusu Rengō-gun. With episode 202, the opening became "Time Machine wo Choudai" (タイムマシーンをちょうだい "Give Me a Time Machine") by King Cream Soda, and the ending became "Aa Jounetsu no Banbaraya" (ああ情熱のバンバラヤー) by LinQ.

In February 2018, it was announced that the anime would end on March 31, 2018, at 214 episodes and was replaced with Yo-kai Watch Shadowside to continue the storyline that began in Oni-ō no Fukkatsu.

In February 2019, it was announced that a revival of the series, now known as Yo-kai Watch! would air on April 5, 2019, replacing Yo-kai Watch Shadowside as direct sequel.

== Series overview ==
Season	Episodes	Originally released	
Season	Episodes	First released	Last released
1	76	January 5, 2014	June 30, 2015
2	74	July 10, 2015	December 23, 2016
3	64	January 4, 2017	March 31, 2018

== List of episodes ==
=== Season 1 (2014–15) ===
No.	English dub title/Original translated title Original Japanese title	Written by	Original airdate	English airdate
1	"Yo-kai Are Real"; Transliteration: "Yōkai ga Iru!" (Japanese: 妖怪がいる!)	Yōichi Katō	January 5, 2014	October 5, 2015
1	"The Spooky Intersection"; Transliteration: "Kyōfu no Kōsaten" (Japanese: 恐怖の交差点)	Yōichi Katō	January 5, 2014	October 5, 2015
Nathan "Nate" Adams is introduced into the World of the Yo-kai when he frees the Yo-kai self-proclaimed butler Whisper from a capsule machine was sealed in 190 years and receives the Yo-kai Watch, just in time to save his parents' marriage from the unintentional disruption of the Yo-kai Dismarelda with her husband Yo-kai Happierre. Whisper explains more of Yo-kai to Nate just as they find an intersection haunted by the Yo-kai Jibanyan, who used to be a living cat until he got hit by a truck, now wanting to prove himself to his former owner Amy; however, Nate's kind words soon make Jibanyan finally believe in himself, and the two become friends, with Nate receiving Jibanyan's Yo-kai Medal as the symbol of their friendship.
2	"The One in the Water" (The Famous One); Transliteration: "Chōyūmei na Aitsu" (Japanese: 超有名なアイツ)	Yōichi Katō	January 8, 2014	October 6, 2015
2	"Why Did You Say That?"; Transliteration: "Nande Sore Itchau no!?" (Japanese: なんでそれ言っちゃうの!?)	Yōichi Katō	January 8, 2014	October 6, 2015
2	"Katie's Secret" (Fumi-chan's Depression); Transliteration: "Fumi-chan no Yūutsu" (Japanese: フミちゃんの憂鬱)	Yōichi Katō	January 8, 2014	October 6, 2015
Nate tells Whisper that people are talking about a specific Yo-kai, which Whisper says is a kappa; they try to find it, while the Yo-kai Walkappa tries to get their attention. Nate's day at school is disrupted by the Yo-kai Tattletell, who possesses his childhood crush Katie Forester and makes her reveal a personal secret that embarrasses him. Later, when Katie is feeling down and won't say why, Nate uses Tattletell to figure out what she is hiding.
3	"The Rare One"; Transliteration: "Rea na Aitsu" (Japanese: レアなアイツ)	Yōichi Katō	January 22, 2014	October 7, 2015
3	"Yo-kai Manjimutt"; Transliteration: "Yōkai Jinmenken" (Japanese: 妖怪じんめん犬)	Yōichi Katō	January 22, 2014	October 7, 2015
3	"Here Comes Roughraff" (You will be Gurerulin!); Transliteration: "Temē mo Gurerurin!" (Japanese: てめーもグレるりん!)	Yōichi Katō	January 22, 2014	October 7, 2015
3	"Manjimutt Part 2"; Transliteration: "Jinmenken Part2" (Japanese: じんめん犬 Part2)	Yōichi Katō	January 22, 2014	October 7, 2015
Whsiper talks about the Yo-kai Noko, and Nate sees it, but Whisper doesn't. Nate and Whisper meet the man-faced dog Yo-kai Manjimutt, Manjimutt is soon arrested but not bofere he grave his Yo-kai Medal to Nate. Later, when Eddie begins to act like a rebel, Nate and Whisper discover he is being possessed by the Yo-kai Roughraff. While in prison, Manjimutt finds a want-ad for a barber.
4	"Yo-kai Medallium" (Yo-kai Dictionary); Transliteration: "Yōkai Daijiten" (Japanese: 妖怪大辞典)	Natsuko Takahashi	January 29, 2014	October 8, 2015
4	"Yo-kai Hungramps"; Transliteration: "Yōkai Himojii" (Japanese: 妖怪ひも爺)	Natsuko Takahashi	January 29, 2014	October 8, 2015
4	"Yo-kai Wazzat"; Transliteration: "Yōkai Wasurenbō" (Japanese: 妖怪わすれん帽)	Natsuko Takahashi	January 29, 2014	October 8, 2015
4	"Manjimutt: Part 3"; Transliteration: "Jinmenken Part3" (Japanese: じんめん犬 Part3)	Natsuko Takahashi	January 29, 2014	October 8, 2015
While Nate cleans his room before his mother goes mad, Whisper gives him the Yo-kai Medallium to store his Yo-kai Medals. Nate and Whisper discover the Yo-kai Hungramps is at the local convenience store, making people unnaturally hungry. Later, Nate and Whisper discover that the reason many people in class are all forgetting things is because of the Yo-kai Wazzat. Manjimutt's barber shop is ruined because everyone thinks he is a dog groomer.
5	"Manjimutt: Part 4"; Transliteration: "Jinmenken Part4" (Japanese: じんめん犬 Part4)	Yōichi Katō	February 5, 2014	October 9, 2015
5	"Yo-kai Illoo"; Transliteration: "Yōkai Maborōshi" (Japanese: 妖怪まぼ老師)	Yōichi Katō	February 5, 2014	October 9, 2015
5	"Let's Exorcise!"; Transliteration: "Oharai Shiyō!" (Japanese: おはらいしよう!)	Yōichi Katō	February 5, 2014	October 9, 2015
Manjimutt's newest venture, a photographer, is disrupted when his client discovers he is not the one who was supposed to photograph her and is arrested. On Valentine's Day, Nate and Whisper discover that Eddie and Bear are under the spell of the illusion casting Yo-kai Illoo. Later, when Jibanyan moves into Nate's house, Nate must save him and Whisper from being rid by an exorcist who is hired after Nate's parents begin to realize Jibanyan's behavior.
6	"Manjimutt: Part 5"; Transliteration: "Jinmenken Part5" (Japanese: じんめん犬 Part5)	Natsuko Takahashi	February 13, 2014	October 12, 2015
6	"Yo-kai Blazion"; Transliteration: "Yōkai Merameraion" (Japanese: 妖怪メラメライオン)	Natsuko Takahashi	February 13, 2014	October 12, 2015
6	"Yo-kai Negatibuzz"; Transliteration: "Yōkai Negatibūn" (Japanese: 妖怪ネガティブーン)	Natsuko Takahashi	February 13, 2014	October 12, 2015
6	"The Sleepover" (The Forbidden Sleepover); Transliteration: "Kindan no Otomarikai" (Japanese: 禁断のお泊り会)	Natsuko Takahashi	February 13, 2014	October 12, 2015
Manjimutt tries an apprenticeship at a bakery, but cannot overcome his canine urges and is arrested. During a park clean up, Nate and his friends get possessed by the lion Yo-kai Blazion, who makes them unusually fired up about the task. Nate gets a sore tooth and is sent to a dentist who is currently depressed because of the Yo-kai Negatibuzz. Bear and Eddie sleep over at Nate's house, and the three secretly watch a late night TV show, but their plans are later disrupted by the electricity-eating Yo-kai Signibble.
7	"Manjimutt: Part 6"; Transliteration: "Jinmenken Part6" (Japanese: じんめん犬 Part6)	Yōichi Katō	February 26, 2014	October 19, 2015
7	"Here's Komasan!"; Transliteration: "Komasan ga Kita!" (Japanese: コマさんがきた!)	Yōichi Katō	February 26, 2014	October 19, 2015
7	"Yo-kai Nosirs"; Transliteration: "Yōkai MitoMEN" (Japanese: 妖怪認MEN)	Yōichi Katō	February 26, 2014	October 19, 2015
Manjimutt goes into the countryside to make pottery, but his works are not appreciated by the police. The country bumpkin Yo-kai Komasan has just moved into the city, so Nate and Whsiper try to show him the ropes. The Yo-kai trio Nosirs are making an exam in class difficult.
8	"Manjimutt: Part 7"; Transliteration: "Jinmenken Part7" (Japanese: じんめん犬 Part7)	Yuka Yamada	March 5, 2014	October 26, 2015
8	"Yo-kai Fidgephant"; Transliteration: "Yōkai Morezō" (Japanese: 妖怪モレゾウ)	Yuka Yamada	March 5, 2014	October 26, 2015
8	"Yo-kai Hidabat"; Transliteration: "Yōkai Hikikōmori" (Japanese: 妖怪ヒキコウモリ)	Yuka Yamada	March 5, 2014	October 26, 2015
Manjimutt decides to go to Hollywood to become a movie star, but is apprehended before he can leave the country and once again is arrested by the police. All the boys at school become overwhelmed with the urge to urinate, which Nate and Whisper discover is because of the Yo-kai Fidgephant. After Nate and Whisper return home, they find that Jibanyan has locked himself up in Nate's room, and Whisper realizes it must be because Jibanyan is possessed by the Yo-kai Hidabat.
9	"Komasan in the City: Here's Komajiro" (Komasan: The Return); Transliteration: "Komasan ~Saikaihen~" (Japanese: コマさん ～再会編～)	Yōichi Katō	March 12, 2014	November 2, 2015
9	"Yo-kai Cadin"; Transliteration: "Yōkai Semimaru" (Japanese: 妖怪セミまる)	Yōichi Katō	March 12, 2014	November 2, 2015
9	"Robonyan Activate!"; Transliteration: "Robonyan Shidō!" (Japanese: ロボニャン始動!)	Yōichi Katō	March 12, 2014	November 2, 2015
Komasan's younger brother Yo-kai Komajiro comes to the city and finds Komasan. After a failed treasure hunt, Nate and Whisper meet the Yo-kai Cadin, who soon realizes that he will die within a week's time because he was not allowed to reincarnate as a cicada. Later, Nate and his Yo-kai companions meet Robonyan, Jibanyan's robot self from the future.
10	"Komasan in the City: Urban Living" (Komasan: The First Meeting); Transliteration: "Komasan ~Hajimete no Machiawase-hen~" (Japanese: コマさん ～はじめての待ち合わせ編～)	Natsuko Takahashi	March 19, 2014	November 9, 2015
10	"Yo-kai Buhu"; Transliteration: "Yōkai Tohohogisu" (Japanese: 妖怪トホホギス)	Natsuko Takahashi	March 19, 2014	November 9, 2015
10	"The Legend of Shogunyan" (Legend Yo-kai! Bushinyan Has Arrived!); Transliteration: "Rejendo Yōkai! Bushinyan Kenzan!" (Japanese: レジェンド妖怪! ブシニャン見参!)	Natsuko Takahashi	March 19, 2014	November 9, 2015
Komasan soon begins to realize that Komajiro is adapting to city life much faster than he anticipated, even picking up city lingo. After a spate of bad luck, Nate discovers he is being possessed by the Yo-kai Buhu, but she just needs his help to get back on her own feet. After Nate has collected many Yo-kai Medals, the Yo-kai Medallium summons the Legendary Yo-kai Shogunyan, a samurai cat.
11	"Komasan in the City: The Turnstile" (Komasan: The First Ticket); Transliteration: "Komasan ~Hajimete no Kaisatsu-hen~" (Japanese: コマさん ～はじめての改札編～)	Yuka Yamada	March 26, 2014	November 16, 2015
11	"Yo-kai Spenp"; Transliteration: "Yōkai Mudazukai" (Japanese: 妖怪ムダヅカイ)	Yuka Yamada	March 26, 2014	November 16, 2015
11	"Yo-kai Noway"; Transliteration: "Yōkai Murikabe" (Japanese: 妖怪ムリカベ)	Yuka Yamada	March 26, 2014	November 16, 2015
11	"Manjimutt: The Great Dog Escape: Catch & Release" (Attention! That Guy Is Coming Back!); Transliteration: "Yoyaku! Aitsu ga Kaettekuru!" (Japanese: 予告! アイツが帰ってくる!)	Yuka Yamada	March 26, 2014	November 16, 2015
Komasan is stymied by a subway turnstile, until Komajiro realizes that he needs a passcard to get through. Nate, Bear and Eddie head to the mall to buy a video game (comic book) they have been saving up for, but are unable to purchase it when the Yo-kai Spenp makes them spend their money frivolously. Later, the Yo-kai Noway continuously makes Nate deny requests and favors for others at school, Meanwhile, Manjimutt is now in prison on Alcatraz.
12	"Komasan in the City: Ear Warmers" (Komasan: The First Cellphone); Transliteration: "Komasan ~Hajimete no Kētai-hen~" (Japanese: コマさん ～はじめてのケータイ編～)	Yōichi Katō	April 4, 2014	November 28, 2015
12	"Yo-kai Cheeksqueek"; Transliteration: "Yōkai Onarazumono" (Japanese: 妖怪おならず者)	Yōichi Katō	April 4, 2014	November 28, 2015
12	"Manjimutt: The Great Dog Escape: Part 1" (Jinmenken Season 2: The Dog Escape: Episode 1); Transliteration: "Jinmenken Shīzun 2 Inu Dassō Episode1" (Japanese: じんめん犬シーズン2 犬脱走 Episode1)	Yōichi Katō	April 4, 2014	November 28, 2015
Komasan tries to explain the concept of cellphones to Komajiro, but Komajiro already has one and is going to meet his friends. While in class, Nate and Whisper discover the farting Yo-kai Cheeksqueek is up to no good. Manjimutt plans his escape from Alcatraz, but gets waylayed by finding bones.
13	"Komasan in the City: Low Budget Vittles" (Komasan: The First Fast Food); Transliteration: "Komasan ~Hajimete no Fasuto Fūdo-hen~" (Japanese: コマさん ～はじめてのファストフード編～)	Natsuko Takahashi	April 11, 2014	December 28, 2015
13	"Yo-kai Chatalie"; Transliteration: "Yōkai Kuchidake-onna" (Japanese: 妖怪口だけおんな)	Natsuko Takahashi	April 11, 2014	December 28, 2015
13	"Yo-kai Dancers"; Transliteration: "Yōkai Dansāzu" (Japanese: 妖怪ダンサーズ)	Natsuko Takahashi	April 11, 2014	December 28, 2015
13	"Manjimutt: The Great Dog Escape: Episode 2" (Jinmenken Season 2: The Dog Escape: Episode 2); Transliteration: "Jinmenken Shīzun 2 Inu Dassō Episode2" (Japanese: じんめん犬シーズン2 犬脱走 Episode2)	Natsuko Takahashi	April 11, 2014	December 28, 2015
Using human disguises, Komasan takes Komajiro to a fast food restaurant, but while Komasan is overwhelmed by the choices, Komajiro buys his lunch easily. Nate and Whisper discover that Bear and Eddie are possessed by the Yo-kai Chatalie, who makes them brag and boast about themselves. During a physical education class on dancing, Nate dances well because of the dancing seaweed Yo-kai Wiglin, Steppa, and Ryth, but they keep possessing him during the school day. Manjimutt plans to escape with what appears to be a talking teddy bear named Sam.
14	"Komasan in the City: The Magic Floor" (Komasan: The First Tower); Transliteration: "Komasan ~Hajimete no Tawā-hen~" (Japanese: コマさん ～はじめてのタワー編～)	Yuka Yamada	April 18, 2014	December 29, 2015
14	"Yo-kai Dazzabel & Yo-kai Dimmy" (Yo-kai Sharekofujin and Jimmy); Transliteration: "Yōkai Sharekofujin to Yōkai Jimī" (Japanese: 妖怪しゃれこ婦人と妖怪ジミー)	Yuka Yamada	April 18, 2014	December 29, 2015
14	"Manjimutt: The Great Dog Escape: Episode 3" (Jinmenken Season 2: The Dog Escape: Episode 3); Transliteration: "Jinmenken Shīzun 2 Inu Dassō Episode3" (Japanese: じんめん犬シーズン2 犬脱走 Episode3)	Yuka Yamada	April 18, 2014	December 29, 2015
Komasan takes Komajiro to the giant Springdale tower, and is overwhelmed by the height, but Komajiro is unimpressed, at least until Komasan discovers a shooting star, impressing his younger brother once more. Nate's mother is suddenly overcome by the desire to dress gaudily for Parents' Day because of the Yo-kai Dazzabel, and the only way to counter her is with the gloomy and dull Yo-kai Dimmy. Manjimutt leads a team of other inmates on an escape attempt, but all is not as it seems if Manjimuut see the full moon.
15	"Komasan in the City: DJKJ" (Komasan: The First Night Out); Transliteration: "Komasan ~Hajimete no Yoasobi-hen~" (Japanese: コマさん ～はじめての夜遊び編～)	Keiichirō Ōchi	April 25, 2014	December 30, 2015
15	"Yo-kai Sproink"; Transliteration: "Yōkai Nobosetonman" (Japanese: 妖怪のぼせトンマン)	Keiichirō Ōchi	April 25, 2014	December 30, 2015
15	"Yo-kai Babblong"; Transliteration: "Yōkai Nagabana" (Japanese: 妖怪ナガバナ)	Keiichirō Ōchi	April 25, 2014	December 30, 2015
15	"Manjimutt: The Great Dog Escape: Episode 4" (Jinmenken Season 2: The Dog Escape: Episode 4); Transliteration: "Jinmenken Shīzun 2 Inu Dassō Episode4" (Japanese: じんめん犬シーズン2 犬脱走 Episode4)	Keiichirō Ōchi	April 25, 2014	December 30, 2015
Komasan joins Komajiro for what he thinks is a festival, but is instead a night club where Komajiro is a popular regular known as K.J. and he has a human girlfriend. At the local hot spring (sentō), Nate and Whisper discover the Boss Yo-kai Sproink is making the water incredibly hot. Later, the Yo-kai Babblong possesses Nate's homeroom teacher, making class unnecessarily long, and soon possesses Katie. On Alcatraz, Manjimutt finds friendship with an inmate named Charlie, until he is approached by a more imposing inmate.
16	"Yo-kai Peppillon" (Golden Week Is Full of Yo-kai!); Transliteration: "Gōruden Wīku wa Yōkai ga Ippai!" (Japanese: ゴールデンウィークは妖怪がいっぱい!)	Yōichi Katō	May 2, 2014	December 31, 2015
16	"Komasan in the City: My Cool Brother" (Komasan: My Cool Bro); Transliteration: "Komasan ~Ora no Kakkoii Niichan-hen~" (Japanese: コマさん ～オラのカッコいい兄ちゃん編～)	Yōichi Katō	May 2, 2014	December 31, 2015
16	"Manjimutt: The Great Dog Escape: Episode 5" (Jinmenken Season 2: The Dog Escape: Episode 5); Transliteration: "Jinmenken Shīzun 2 Inu Dassō Episode5]" (Japanese: じんめん犬シーズン2 犬脱走 Episode5)	Yōichi Katō	May 2, 2014	December 31, 2015
The three main characters try to enjoy a spring break (Golden Week) trip with Nate's parents, but they become possessed by the Yo-kai Peppillon before they even get out the front door, and later encounter the Yo-kai Drizzle and Mirapo during the trip. Komasan helps Komajiro in a confrontation at the night club when everyone discovers he is from the countryside. Manjimutt discovers the other inmate is an undercover cop who is looking to get Charlie incarcerated further, as well as learning about Charlie being a homicidal maniac, and is pleased he may be able to get out early.
17	"Komasan: Movin On Up Episode 1" (Komasan Season 2: The Rosy Bumpkin Episode 1); Transliteration: "Komasan Shīzun 2 Inakamono wa Bara-iro ni Episode1" (Japanese: コマさんシーズン2 田舎者はバラ色に Episode1)	Natsuko Takahashi	May 9, 2014	January 1, 2016
17	"Yo-kai Cynake"; Transliteration: "Yōkai Sunesunēku" (Japanese: 妖怪すねスネーク)	Natsuko Takahashi	May 9, 2014	January 1, 2016
17	"Yo-kai Rockabelly"; Transliteration: "Yōkai Harao-dori" (Japanese: 妖怪はらおドリ)	Natsuko Takahashi	May 9, 2014	January 1, 2016
17	"Manjimutt: The Great Dog Escape: Episode 6" (Jinmenken Season 2: The Dog Escape: Episode 6); Transliteration: "Jinmenken Shīzun 2 Inu Dassō Episode6" (Japanese: じんめん犬シーズン2 犬脱走 Episode6)	Natsuko Takahashi	May 9, 2014	January 1, 2016
Komasan takes a job at the toy company Dandai as a janitor, and accidentally inspires the president to create a line of various toys and a mascot character that get popular, prompting Komasan's promotion. On Mother's Day, Nate's mother is possessed by the Yo-kai Cynake, who makes her upsetly unappreciative of her gifts. Later, when the wild trend of belly dancing with a strange face on the dancer's stomach that is taking the city by storm occurs in class, Nate and Whisper discover it is because of the Yo-kai Rockabelly. Manjimutt is happy he will be finally freed from Alcatraz, but is surprised when the warden accidentally frees another dog-like inmate instead of him, leaving him to Charlie's wrath.
18	"Kyubi: Operation Heartbreak" (Kyubi's Heart Stealing Operation: The Meeting); Transliteration: "Kyūbi no Kyunkyun Daisakusen Deai-hen" (Japanese: キュウビのキュンキュン大作戦 出会い編)	Yuka Yamada	May 16, 2014	January 6, 2016 (AU); January 11, 2016 (US)
18	"Yo-kai Gargaros" (Oni Time); Transliteration: "Oni Jikan" (Japanese: 鬼時間)	Yuka Yamada	May 16, 2014	January 6, 2016 (AU); January 11, 2016 (US)
18	"Komasan: Movin On Up! Episode 2" (Komasan Season 2: The Rosy Bumpkin Episode 2); Transliteration: "Komasan Shīzun 2 Inakamono wa Bara-iro ni Episode2" (Japanese: コマさんシーズン2 田舎者はバラ色に Episode2)	Yuka Yamada	May 16, 2014	January 6, 2016 (AU); January 11, 2016 (US)
The Yo-kai Kyubi arrives in Springdale to steal one hundred women's hearts through charm, and sets his sights on stealing Katie's heart next, but cannot seem to succeed. When Nate's mother tells him to stay in the house and wait for a delivery while she is out, his act of defying her order sends him and his Yo-kai companions into the Terror (Oni) Time, a dangerous dimension children are sent into if they do not listen to their parents, where the three are pursued by the powerful Oni Yo-kai Gargaros. Komasan's new ideas seem to be stolen by a rival company, leaving the president of Dandai suspicious of who is behind things.
19	"Komasan: Movin On Up! Episode 3" (Komasan Season 2: The Rosy Bumpkin Episode 3); Transliteration: "Komasan Shīzun 2 Inakamono wa Bara-iro ni Episode 3" (Japanese: コマさんシーズン2 田舎者はバラ色に Episode3)	Keiichirō Ōchi	May 23, 2014	January 7, 2016 (AU); January 18, 2016 (US)
19	"Yo-kai Baku"; Transliteration: "Yōkai Baku" (Japanese: 妖怪バク)	Keiichirō Ōchi	May 23, 2014	January 7, 2016 (AU); January 18, 2016 (US)
19	"Kyubi: Operation Amusement Park" (Kyubi's Heart Stealing Operation: The Amusement Park); Transliteration: "Kyuubi no Kyunkyun Daisakusen Yūenchi-hen" (Japanese: キュウビのキュンキュン大作戦 遊園地編)	Keiichirō Ōchi	May 23, 2014	January 7, 2016 (AU); January 18, 2016 (US)
Komasan helps Dandai's president get in touch with his daughter, again, because she is looking for a new dance craze. The fellas discover the Yo-kai Baku has put Nate's entire class to sleep only looking for a particularly tasty dream to eat. Kyubi attempts to steal Katie's heart at the amusement park, but is not prepared for the human world's thrill rides and ends unsuccessfully again.
20	"The Legend of Dandoodle" (Legend Yo-kai! Dandoodle!); Transliteration: "Rejendo Yōkai! Ikemenken!" (Japanese: レジェンド妖怪! イケメン犬!)	Yōichi Katō	May 30, 2014	January 8, 2016 (AU); January 25, 2016 (US)
20	"Komasan: Movin' On Up! Episode 4" (Komasan Season 2: The Rosy Bumpkin Episode 4); Transliteration: "Komasan Shīzun 2 Inakamono wa Bara-iro ni Episode4" (Japanese: コマさんシーズン2 田舎者はバラ色に Episode4)	Yōichi Katō	May 30, 2014	January 8, 2016 (AU); January 25, 2016 (US)
With a new page filled, the new Yo-kai Medallium summons Dandoodle, a Legendary Yo-kai who is irresistible to the ladies. Komasan is left in charge of Dandai while the president takes a vacation, but realizes he is beginning to lose touch with Komajiro.
21	"Yo-kai D'wanna"; Transliteration: "Yōkai Tsuzukanasō" (Japanese: 妖怪つづかな僧)	Yuka Yamada	June 6, 2014	January 11, 2016 (AU); February 22, 2016 (US)
21	"Yo-kai Insomni"; Transliteration: "Yōkai Fūmin" (Japanese: 妖怪フゥミン)	Yuka Yamada	June 6, 2014	January 11, 2016 (AU); February 22, 2016 (US)
21	"Komasan in Love Episode 1" (Komasan Season 3: Love and Poetry and Coffee Cup 1); Transliteration: "Komasan Shīzun 3 Koi to Poemu to Kōhī to Ippaime" (Japanese: コマさんシーズン3 恋とポエムとコーヒーと 1杯目)	Yuka Yamada	June 6, 2014	January 11, 2016 (AU); February 22, 2016 (US)
Nate and Whisper discover Katie is possessed by the Yo-kai D'wanna when she begins to give up on tasks suddenly. Everyone in class seems to be exhausted because the Yo-kai Insomni has decided to make them stay up all night and not fall asleep. Komasan happens to enter a coffee shop and meets the girl of his dreams.
22	"Komasan in Love Episode 2" (Komasan Season 3: Love and Poetry and Coffee Cup 2); Transliteration: "Komasan Shīzun 3 Koi to Poemu to Kōhī to Nihaime" (Japanese: コマさんシーズン3 恋とポエムとコーヒーと 2杯目)	Natsuko Takahashi	June 13, 2014	January 12, 2016 (AU); February 29, 2016 (US)
22	"Yo-kai Duchoo"; Transliteration: "Yōkai Kazekamo" (Japanese: 妖怪かぜカモ)	Natsuko Takahashi	June 13, 2014	January 12, 2016 (AU); February 29, 2016 (US)
22	"Yo-kai Ake & Payn" (Why Does My Shoulder Feel Stiff?); Transliteration: "Kata ga Korutte Donna Kanji?" (Japanese: 肩がこるってどんな感じ?)	Natsuko Takahashi	June 13, 2014	January 12, 2016 (AU); February 29, 2016 (US)
Komajiro gives Komasan the push to get to know the girl from the coffee shop, but is horrified when he learns the girl is being stalked. When Nate realizes he is not as far along in a video game as his friends, he asks the Yo-kai Duchoo to coach him to fool his mother into thinking that he has a cold and has to stay home. At school, Nate discovers that all his friends have sore shoulders because of the Yo-kai duo Ake and Payn.
23	"Komasan in Love Episode 3" (Komasan Season 3: Love and Poetry and Coffee Cup 3); Transliteration: "Komasan Shīzun 3 Koi to Poemu to Kōhī to Sanbaime" (Japanese: コマさんシーズン3 恋とポエムとコーヒーと 3杯目)	Keiichirō Ōchi	June 20, 2014	January 13, 2016 (AU); March 1, 2016 (US)
23	"Yo-kai Grubsnitch"; Transliteration: "Yōkai Tsumamiguinosuke" (Japanese: 妖怪つまみぐいのすけ)	Keiichirō Ōchi	June 20, 2014	January 13, 2016 (AU); March 1, 2016 (US)
23	"Yo-kai B3-NK1"; Transliteration: "Yōkai Karakuri Benkei" (Japanese: 妖怪からくりベンケイ)	Keiichirō Ōchi	June 20, 2014	January 13, 2016 (AU); March 1, 2016 (US)
Komasan tries to save the girl from her threat, but discovers she is simply a manga artist who was talking about her story when her manuscript is sent flying by mistake. Nate's mother prepares a large dinner for the family, but the Yo-kai Grubsnitch makes her eat it without her knowing. The mechanical Yo-kai B3-NK1 breaks the electronics in Nate's house in search for the "Hero's Screw" to make him more powerful.
24	"Komasan in Love Episode 4" (Komasan Season 3: Love and Poetry and Coffee Cup 4); Transliteration: "Komasan Shīzun 3 Koi to Poemu to Kōhī to Yonhaime" (Japanese: コマさんシーズン3 恋とポエムとコーヒーと 4杯目)	Yōichi Katō	June 27, 2014	January 14, 2016 (AU); March 2, 2016 (US)
24	"Yo-kai Tengloom"; Transliteration: "Yōkai Nekuramatengu" (Japanese: 妖怪ネクラマテング)	Yōichi Katō	June 27, 2014	January 14, 2016 (AU); March 2, 2016 (US)
24	"The Real One" (The Real One Appears!); Transliteration: "Honmono Tōjō!" (Japanese: ホンモノ登場!)	Yōichi Katō	June 27, 2014	January 14, 2016 (AU); March 2, 2016 (US)
Komasan learns that the manga artist wants to write a manga on yōkai, and Komasan becomes conflicted if he should help her obtain the realism she wants. Nate and Whisper discover Nate's friends are possessed by the Yo-kai Tengloom when they become gloomy out of nowhere. Whisper praises the real Yo-kai Tengu, who he claims is a close friend, until they find him.
25	"Jibanyan's Secret"; Transliteration: "Jibanyan no Himitsu" (Japanese: ジバニャンの秘密)	Akihiro Hino	July 4, 2014	January 15, 2016 (AU); March 3, 2016 (US)
After Nate and Jibanyan have a fight, Jibanyan runs away from home and is sent back in time by the evil reaper Yo-kai duo Kin and Gin to relive the final days of his life as the cat Rudy with his owner Amy, soon finding out the truth about how he really died.
26	"Yo-kai Espy"; Transliteration: "Yōkai Satori-chan" (Japanese: 妖怪さとりちゃん)	Yuka Yamada	July 11, 2014	January 18, 2016 (AU) March 4, 2016 (US)
26	"Yo-kai Peckpocket"; Transliteration: "Yōkai Yokodori" (Japanese: 妖怪ヨコドリ)	Yuka Yamada	July 11, 2014	January 18, 2016 (AU) March 4, 2016 (US)
26	"Komasan in Love Episode 5" (Komasan Season 3: Love and Poetry and Coffee Cup 5); Transliteration: "Komasan Shīzun 3 Koi to Poemu to Kōhī to Gohaime" (Japanese: コマさんシーズン3 恋とポエムとコーヒーと 5杯目)	Yuka Yamada	July 11, 2014	January 18, 2016 (AU) March 4, 2016 (US)
Katie seems to have gained psychic powers, but it is the result of the Yo-kai Espy. Bear starts to take things from people because he is possessed by the Yo-kai Peckpocket.
27	"The New Yo-kai Watch" (Let's Get the New Yo-kai Watch); Transliteration: "Shingata Yōkai Wotchi o Te ni Irero" (Japanese: 新型妖怪ウォッチを手に入れろ)	Yōichi Katō	July 18, 2014	August 1, 2016
27	"The Unboxing" (Opening the Right Box); Transliteration: "Tadashii Hako no Akekata" (Japanese: 正しい箱の開け方)	Yōichi Katō	July 18, 2014	August 1, 2016
Nate and Whisper travel to the Yo-kai World to track down the Yo-kai Watch Model Zero, and later, they try to figure out how to use the Model Zero with bad luck.
28	"Here Come the Classic Yo-kai" (Come Out Classic Yo-kai); Transliteration: "Detazo Koten Yōkai" (Japanese: 出たぞ古典妖怪！)	Keiichirō Ōchi	July 25, 2014	August 2, 2016
28	"Let's Exorcise (Again!)" (The Exorcist Returns); Transliteration: "Oharai Ritānzu" (Japanese: お祓いリターンズ)	Keiichirō Ōchi	July 25, 2014	August 2, 2016
28	"Are They Really Cool?" (Classic Yo-kai Are Cool?); Transliteration: "Koten Yōkai tte Sugoi no?" (Japanese: 古典妖怪ってすごいの？)	Keiichirō Ōchi	July 25, 2014	August 2, 2016
Nate meets the Classic Yo-kai from 100 years in the past, and must deal with the exorcist again when the Classic Yo-kai disrupt his home life.
29	"Springdale Five-Yo: Episode 1 – The Unwilling Occupant" (The Sun Roars, Zura! Episode One 'The Hostage'); Transliteration: "Taiyō ni Hoeru Zura! Dai-Ichi-Wa "Hitojichi"" (Japanese: 太陽にほえるズラ！ 第一話「人質」)	Yuka Yamada	August 1, 2014	August 3, 2016
29	"Yo-kai Swelton"; Transliteration: "Yōkai Asekkaki" (Japanese: 妖怪あせっか鬼)	Yuka Yamada	August 1, 2014	August 3, 2016
29	"Yo-kai Brokenbella"; Transliteration: "Yōkai Sakasakkasa" (Japanese: 妖怪さかさっ傘)	Yuka Yamada	August 1, 2014	August 3, 2016
Komasan and Whisper begin working as police officers, and must deal with a hostage crisis. Nate meets the sweaty Yo-kai Swelton when the weather gets humid, and later helps the inside-out umbrella Yo-kai Brokenbrella when his umbrella gets turned inside out during a strong storm.
30	"Springdale Five-Yo: Episode 2 – The Ransom" (The Sun Roars, Zura! Episode 2 'The Kidnapping'); Transliteration: "Taiyō ni Hoeru Zura! Dai-Ni-Wa "Yūkai"" (Japanese: 太陽にほえるズラ！ 第二話「誘拐」)	Yōichi Katō	August 8, 2014	August 4, 2016
30	"Yo-kai Pandle"; Transliteration: "Yōkai Buyōjinbō" (Japanese: 妖怪ぶようじん坊)	Yōichi Katō	August 8, 2014	August 4, 2016
30	"Yo-kai So-Sorree"; Transliteration: "Yōkai Ittangomen" (Japanese: 妖怪一旦ゴメン)	Yōichi Katō	August 8, 2014	August 4, 2016
Komasan and Whisper investigate a ransom. When Nate forgets his wallet at home, it is stolen by the Yo-kai Pandle, who bothers people who are careless with their things. Later, Nate is possessed by the Yo-kai So-Sorree, who makes him pull pranks in class and then feign an apology.
31	"Westward Yo!" (Yo-kai Journey to the West); Transliteration: "Yōkai Saiyūki" (Japanese: 妖怪西遊記)	Natsuko Takahashi	August 15, 2014	August 5, 2016
Nate, Whisper, Jibanyan, Komasan, and Kyubi find themselves forced to act out the story of Journey to the West by the movie director Yo-kai Directator.
32	"Springdale Five-Yo: Episode 3 – The Interrogation Room" (The Sun Roars, Zura! Episode 3 'The Interrogation Room'); Transliteration: "Taiyō ni Hoeru Zura! Dai-San-Wa "Torishirabe-shitsu"" (Japanese: 太陽にほえるズラ！ 第三話「取り調べ室」)	Natsuko Takahashi	August 22, 2014	August 8, 2016
32	"Yo-kai Lie-in Heart"; Transliteration: "Yōkai Man'ojishi" (Japanese: 妖怪万尾獅子)	Natsuko Takahashi	August 22, 2014	August 8, 2016
32	"Cool Yo-kai Showdown!"; Transliteration: "Iketeru Yōkai Taiketsu!" (Japanese: イケてる妖怪対決！)	Natsuko Takahashi	August 22, 2014	August 8, 2016
Komasan attempts to question. As summer vacation ends, Nate worries that he has not finished his homework for the break, and discovers that Bear is possessed by the samurai lion Yo-kai Lie-in Heart, who has made him prepared. Later, with school starting up once more, Dandoodle and Kyubi have a battle to see who can make Nate a model.
33	"Springdale Five-Yo Episode 4 – The Stakeout" (The Sun Roars, Zura! Episode 4 'The Stakeout'); Transliteration: "Taiyō ni Hoeru zura! Dai-Yon-Wa "Harikomi"" (Japanese: 太陽にほえるズラ！ 第四話「張り込み」)	Keiichirō Ōchi	August 29, 2014	August 9, 2016
33	"Yo-kai Papa Windbag"; Transliteration: "Yōkai Jigajīsan" (Japanese: 妖怪じがじぃさん)	Keiichirō Ōchi	August 29, 2014	August 9, 2016
33	"Which One Is Real?" (Which is The Real One!?); Transliteration: "Honmono wa Dotchi da!?" (Japanese: ホンモノはどっちだ！？)	Keiichirō Ōchi	August 29, 2014	August 9, 2016
Nate discovers that his friends are possessed by the bragging Yo-kai Papa Windbag. Nate must referee a dispute between Walkappa and the Classic Yo-kai Faux Kappa.
34	"Springdale Five-Yo: Episode 5 – Shake a Tail" (The Sun Roars, Zura! Episode 5 'Tailing'); Transliteration: "Taiyō ni Hoeru zura! Dai-Go-Wa "Bikō"" (Japanese: 太陽にほえるズラ！ 第五話「尾行」)	Yuka Yamada	September 5, 2014	August 10, 2016
34	"Yo-kai Yoodooit"; Transliteration: "Yōkai Hitomakasennin" (Japanese: 妖怪ひとまか仙人)	Yuka Yamada	September 5, 2014	August 10, 2016
34	"Yo-kai Enerfly"; Transliteration: "Yōkai Zekkōchō" (Japanese: 妖怪ぜっこう蝶)	Yuka Yamada	September 5, 2014	August 10, 2016
Nate's mother is possessed by the Yo-kai Yoodooit, who makes her lazy and reliable on Nate to do the chores around the house. Later, Eddie is possessed by the Yo-kai Enerfly, who annoyingly makes him see the good things in life.
35	"Springdale Five-Yo: Episode 6 – Prime Suspect" (The Sun Roars, Zura! Episode 6 'SP'); Transliteration: "Taiyō ni Hoeru zura! Dai-Roku-Wa "SP"" (Japanese: 太陽にほえるズラ！ 第六話「SP」)	Keiichirō Ōchi	September 12, 2014	August 11, 2016
35	"Titanics of the Caribbean" (Yo-kai Titanic); Transliteration: "Yōkai Taitanikku" (Japanese: 妖怪タイタニック)	Keiichirō Ōchi	September 12, 2014	August 11, 2016
35	"Yo-kai Cricky"; Transliteration: "Yōkai Nechigaeru" (Japanese: 妖怪ねちがえる)	Keiichirō Ōchi	September 12, 2014	August 11, 2016
Directator returns and makes Nate take part in a recreation of Titanic, but he makes it a pirate-filled slapstick comedy. Nate discovers that everyone in his class has cricks in their neck, only to discover the Yo-kai Cricky is to blame, but he too is suffering and needs Nate's help.
36	"Springdale Five-Yo: Episode 7 – Imminent Danger Removal" (The Sun Roars, Zura! Episode 7 'Bomb Removal'); Transliteration: "Taiyō ni Hoeru zura! Dai-Nana-Wa "Bakudan Shori"" (Japanese: 太陽にほえるズラ！ 第七話「爆弾処理」)	Natsuko Takahashi	September 19, 2014	August 12, 2016
36	"Sgt. Burly"(Yo-kai Sergeant Bully); Transliteration: "Yōkai Burī-taichō" (Japanese: 妖怪ブリー隊長)	Natsuko Takahashi	September 19, 2014	August 12, 2016
36	"Yo-kai Heheheel"; Transliteration: "Yōkai Warautsubo" (Japanese: 妖怪笑ウツボ)	Natsuko Takahashi	September 19, 2014	August 12, 2016
Whisper gets caught in a never ending exercise routine set out by the Yo-kai Sergeant Burly, but Nate does not know how to stop the enthusiastic Yo-kai. When visiting Bear at the hospital, Eddie cannot stop laughing and Nate discovers it is because he is possessed by the laughter inducing Yo-kai Heheheel.
37	"Fitno-Failure" (The Field Day is Full of Yo-kai!); Transliteration: "Undōkai wa Yōkai ga Ippai!" (Japanese: 運動会は妖怪がいっぱい！)	Yuka Yamada	September 26, 2014	August 27, 2016
37	"Springdale Five-Yo: The Finale" (The Sun Roars, Zura! Finale 'Martyr'); Transliteration: "Taiyō ni Hoeru zura! Saishū-Wa "Junshoku"" (Japanese: 太陽にほえるズラ！ 最終話「殉職」)	Yuka Yamada	September 26, 2014	August 27, 2016
37	"Gourmet School Lunch: Preview" (The School Lunch Gourmet: Preview); Transliteration: "Kyūshoku no Gurume Yokoku" (Japanese: 給食のグルメ 予告)	Yuka Yamada	September 26, 2014	August 27, 2016
Nate's school's field day gets disrupted by a series of Yo-kai possessions, all while he is trying to show Katie how cool he is.
38	"Snack Wars"; Transliteration: "Bokura no Sanbyaku En Sensō" (Japanese: ぼくらの300円戦争)	Yōichi Katō	October 3, 2014	September 3, 2016
38	"Yo-kai Verygoodsir"; Transliteration: "Kanpeki Shitsuji Yōkai Sebasuchan" (Japanese: カンペキ執事妖怪セバスチャン)	Yōichi Katō	October 3, 2014	September 3, 2016
38	"Gourmet School Lunch: Meal 1 Stew"; Transliteration: "Kyūshoku no Gurume Dai-Ichi-Wa "Karē Raisu"" (Japanese: 給食のグルメ 第1話「カレーライス」)	Yōichi Katō	October 3, 2014	September 3, 2016
Nate goes out to the candy store to shop with his limited budget, but he is challenged by Bear and Eddie to find the most original candy they can within their limit. When Whisper comes down with the Yo-kai flu, the butler Yo-kai Verygoodsir takes over his job until he gets better, but Whisper worries he will be replaced when Nate and Jibanyan see how perfect Verygoodsir is in comparison.
39	"Gourmet School Lunch: Meal 2 Pudding!"; Transliteration: "Kyūshoku no Gurume Dai-Ni-Wa "Purin"" (Japanese: 給食のグルメ 第2話「プリン」)	Keiichirō Ōchi	October 10, 2014	September 10, 2016
39	"Yo-kai Failian"; Transliteration: "Yōkai Yū Esu Ō" (Japanese: 妖怪U.S.O.)	Keiichirō Ōchi	October 10, 2014	September 10, 2016
39	"Yo-kai Spoilerina"; Transliteration: "Yōkai Netabarerīna" (Japanese: 妖怪ネタバレリーナ)	Keiichirō Ōchi	October 10, 2014	September 10, 2016
Nate's friends get possessed by the Yo-kai Failian, who makes them tell lies. Nate and his friends's plans to see a movie are threatened by the Legendary Yo-kai Spoilerina, a spoiler-giving dancer.
40	"Yo-kai Top 10"; Transliteration: "Yōkai Besuto Ten" (Japanese: 妖怪ベストテン)	Yuka Yamada	October 17, 2014	September 17, 2016
40	"Yo-kai Count Zapaway"; Transliteration: "Yōkai Rimokonkakushi" (Japanese: 妖怪りもこんかくし)	Yuka Yamada	October 17, 2014	September 17, 2016
40	"Gourmet School Lunch: Meal 3 Cruller!"; Transliteration: "Kyūshoku no Gurume Dai-San-Wa "Agepan"" (Japanese: 給食のグルメ 第3話「揚げパン」)	Yuka Yamada	October 17, 2014	September 17, 2016
Manjimutt and Tattletell hold a count down for the top ten Yo-kai, and Whisper hopes he will win. While trying to watch a soccer game on TV, Nate cannot find the remote control because it has been stolen by the Yo-kai Count Zapaway.
41	"Gourmet School Lunch: Meal 4 Fried Chicken!"; Transliteration: "Kyūshoku no Gurume Dai-Yon-Wa "Karaage"" (Japanese: 給食のグルメ 第4話「唐揚げ」)	Keiichirō Ōchi	October 24, 2014	September 24, 2016
41	"Yo-kai Shmoopie"; Transliteration: "Yōkai Kyuntarō" (Japanese: 妖怪キュン太郎)	Keiichirō Ōchi	October 24, 2014	September 24, 2016
41	"Yo-kai Yoink"; Transliteration: "Yōkai Karipakkun" (Japanese: 妖怪かりパックン)	Keiichirō Ōchi	October 24, 2014	September 24, 2016
The Yo-kai Shmoopie makes Katie all loveydovey, and Nate discovers the only way to solve the possession is with Manjimutt. The Yo-kai Yoink possesses Nate's father, making him absently take things without realizing.
42	"Horror of Dracunyan"; Transliteration: "Gabunyan Hazādo" (Japanese: ガブニャンハザード)	Natsuko Takahashi	October 31, 2014	October 8, 2016
Nate has not got a costume ready for the Halloween Parade, and while Bear, Eddie, and Katie wait for him, he and his Yo-kai companions discover his mother has become something like a vampire. Nate soon discovers that the Yo-kai Dracunyan is to blame, and has turned the whole town into other Dracunyan. Nate gets Bear, Eddie, and Katie, who have not been bitten, to help him stop Dracunyan, telling them about the existence of Yo-kai.
43	"Professor Vacant and the Mysterious Mansion"; Transliteration: "Renkon-kyōju to Fushigi na Yakata" (Japanese: レンコン教授と不思議な館)	Natsuko Takahashi	November 7, 2014	October 8, 2016
Nate and his classmates go into the hills to do a tree planting, but they can only talk about their favorite new anime Professor Vacant. When they find a mystery, they begin to try to solve what has happened just as Professor Vacant would. Meanwhile, Jibanyan and Whisper believe a Legendary Yo-kai is involved and plan to discover it on their own.
44	"Hangin' With Mr. Crabbycat: Lesson 1"; Transliteration: "San-nen Wai-gumi Nyanpachi-sensei Dai-Ichi-Wa" (Japanese: 3年Y組ニャンパチ先生 第一話)	Yōichi Katō	November 14, 2014	October 15, 2016
44	"Yo-kai Mimikin"; Transliteration: "Yōkai Monomanekin" (Japanese: 妖怪モノマネキン)	Yōichi Katō	November 14, 2014	October 15, 2016
44	"Yo-kai Snottle"; Transliteration: "Yōkai Hanahojin" (Japanese: 妖怪ハナホ人)	Yōichi Katō	November 14, 2014	October 15, 2016
Year 3 Class Y's homeroom teacher Mr. Crabbycat tries to whip his students into shape with the help of vice homeroom teacher Mr. Komasan. When Katie rudely impersonates the teacher, Nate and his Yo-kai companions discover she is possessed by the Yo-kai Mimikin. Jibanyan wants to go to a Next Harmeowny handshaking event, but everything happening throughout the day makes his chances of going dwindle, including the appearance of the mysterious Yo-kai Snottle, who makes people pick their nose.
45	"Hangin' With Mr. Crabbycat: Lesson 2"; Transliteration: "San-nen Wai-gumi Nyanpachi-sensei Dai-Ni-Wa" (Japanese: 3年Y組ニャンパチ先生 第二話)	Yuka Yamada	November 21, 2014	October 29, 2016
45	"Every Cold Has Its Thorn(yan)"; Transliteration: "Kaze to Tomo ni Togenyan" (Japanese: 風邪とともにトゲニャン)	Yuka Yamada	November 21, 2014	October 29, 2016
45	"Yo-kai Sandmeh"; Transliteration: "Yōkai Sunao" (Japanese: 妖怪砂夫)	Yuka Yamada	November 21, 2014	October 29, 2016
After some exercise, Jibanyan has come down with a cold and somehow been turned into Thornyan, a cat Yo-Kai with spines that shoot out whenever he sneezes. At Eddie's birthday party, he becomes possessed by the honesty sand Yo-kai Sandmeh.
46	"Hangin' With Mr. CrabbyCat: Lesson 3"; Transliteration: "San-nen Wai-gumi Nyanpachi-sensei Dai-San-Wa" (Japanese: 3年Y組ニャンパチ先生 第三話)	Takamitsu Kōno	November 28, 2014	November 5, 2016
46	"Yo-Kai Supoor Hero"; Transliteration: "Yōkai Okanenaidā" (Japanese: 妖怪お金ナイダー)	Takamitsu Kōno	November 28, 2014	November 5, 2016
46	"Legend of Poofessor"; Transliteration: "Rejendo Yōkai Unchikuma" (Japanese: レジェンド妖怪 うんちく魔)	Takamitsu Kōno	November 28, 2014	November 5, 2016
When Nate suddenly discovers he is out of money when he plans to buy a new issue of his favorite manga, he discovers the Yo-kai Supoor Hero is to blame. Bear, Eddie, and Katie all begin to talk about useless trivia, and Nate discovers they are possessed by the Legendary Yo-kai Poofessor, who is in search for the one true piece of trivia. Note: "Legend of Poofessor" was first shown in English at the end of "Yo-Kai Watch: The Movie Event" on October 15, 2016, in 300 US theaters.
47	"Whisper's Secret Past"; Transliteration: "Yōkai Gunshi Wisubē" (Japanese: 妖怪軍師ウィスベェ)	Akihiro Hino	December 12, 2014	November 12, 2016
Whisper and Jibanyan are sent back in time by Kin and Gin to the Sengoku period, where Whisper helps Shogun Waitington, a man Whisper had helped in the past but that he cannot remember why he regrets his actions.
48	"Hangin' With Mr. Crabbycat: Lesson 4"; Transliteration: "San-nen Wai-gumi Nyanpachi-sensei Dai-Yon-Wa" (Japanese: 3年Y組ニャンパチ先生 第四話)	Yōichi Katō	December 19, 2014	November 19, 2016
48	"The Missing Yo-kai Pad"; Transliteration: "Kieta Yōkai Paddo" (Japanese: 消えた妖怪パッド)	Yōichi Katō	December 19, 2014	November 19, 2016
48	"Yo-Kai Report Cards!"; Transliteration: "Yōkai mo Tsūshinbo!" (Japanese: 妖怪も通信簿！)	Yōichi Katō	December 19, 2014	November 19, 2016
Whisper accidentally flushes the Yo-kai Pad down the toilet, leading Nate and Jibanyan on a search to get it back. Nate is worried about his winter report card, but Verygoodsir comes back to reveal that there is also a report card that the Yo-kai each get.
49	"A Very Yo-Kai Christmas"; Transliteration: "Kurisumasu ni mo Yōkai ga Ippai!" (Japanese: クリスマスにも妖怪がいっぱい！)	Keiichirō Ōchi	December 19, 2014	December 3, 2016
49	"The Koma-Santa Clause"; Transliteration: "Kotoshi no Santa wa Komasanta" (Japanese: 今年のサンタはコマサンタ)	Keiichirō Ōchi	December 19, 2014	December 3, 2016
49	"Yo-Kai Ol' Saint Trick" (Yo-kai Santac Roshi); Transliteration: "Yōkai Santakurōshi" (Japanese: 妖怪サンタク老師)	Keiichirō Ōchi	December 19, 2014	December 3, 2016
Nate goes out to pick up his family's Christmas cake but find that the town is once again overrun with Yo-kai. Komasan and Komajiro get asked to deliver presents for Santa Claus, but are overrun by children's requests. Nate's mother is possessed by the Yo-kai Ol' Saint Trick, who makes Nate answer three questions, or else he will be sucked up into one of his bags.
50	"Hangin' With Mr. Crabbycat: Lesson 5"; Transliteration: "San-nen Wai-gumi Nyanpachi-sensei Dai-Go-Wa" (Japanese: 3年Y組ニャンパチ先生 第五話)	Yōichi Katō	December 26, 2014	December 10, 2016
50	"The Adams House: The House Cleaning War!"; Transliteration: "Amano-ke Ōsōji no Ran!" (Japanese: 天野家 大掃除の乱！)	Yōichi Katō	December 26, 2014	December 10, 2016
50	"Venoct's Revenge 1: The Search"; Transliteration: "Sasurai no Orochi Dai-Ichi-Maku Akai Saikyō Yōkai" (Japanese: さすらいのオロチ 第一幕 赤い最強妖怪)	Yōichi Katō	December 26, 2014	December 10, 2016
While trying to clean up the house, Nate discovers rival armies of Brushido led by Washogun and an unseen leader are vying for control of the cleanup. The powerful Yo-kai Venoct arrives in town seeking a battle with the powerful Boss Yo-kai Rubeus J, but his description leads Nate to think that his opponent is actually Jibanyan.
51	"Venoct's Revenge 2: Enemy Camp"; Transliteration: "Sasurai no Orochi Dai-Ni-Maku Kyōfu no Ajito" (Japanese: さすらいのオロチ 第二幕 恐怖のアジト)	Natsuko Takahashi	January 9, 2015	December 17, 2016
51	"Yo-kai Pandanoko"; Transliteration: "Yōkai Tsuchinoko Panda" (Japanese: 妖怪ツチノコパンダ)	Natsuko Takahashi	January 9, 2015	December 17, 2016
51	"Yo-kai Cutta-nah"; Transliteration: "Yōkai Daraketō" (Japanese: 妖怪ダラケ刀)	Natsuko Takahashi	January 9, 2015	December 17, 2016
Venoct tells Jibanyan a description of Rubeus J's base which sounds like Nate's house and Nate's parents. On New Year's Day, Nate comes across the extremely rare Yo-kai Pandanoko, but it turns out Pandanoko has been waiting for him. Nate's mother suddenly becomes lazy during the New Year festivities because she is possessed by the Yo-kai Cutta-nah.
52	"Venoct's Revenge 3: The Army of Evil"; Transliteration: "Sasurai no Orochi Dai-San-Maku Jigoku no Gundan" (Japanese: さすらいのオロチ 第三幕 地獄の軍団)	Yuka Yamada	January 16, 2015	December 26, 2016
52	"Yo-kai Drizzelda and Ray O'Light"; Transliteration: "Yōkai Ameonna to Hareotoko" (Japanese: 妖怪雨女と晴れ男)	Yuka Yamada	January 16, 2015	December 26, 2016
52	"Yo-kai Jumbelina"; Transliteration: "Yōkai Tsuragawari" (Japanese: 妖怪つらがわり)	Yuka Yamada	January 16, 2015	December 26, 2016
Venoct tells Jibanyan a description of Rubeus J's army which sounds like the students at the school. Nate's sunny day is ruined when he discovers Katie is possessed by the Yo-kai Drizzelda, leading Nate to seek out the Yo-kai Ray O'Light to cheer her up. The Yo-kai Jumbelina appears and mixes up everyone's faces, but she misplaces Nate's, leading the group on a hunt for his original face.
53	"Venoct's Revenge 4: Rubeus J"; Transliteration: "Sasurai no Orochi Saishū-Maku Zetsubō no Shinjitsu" (Japanese: さすらいのオロチ 最終幕 絶望の真実)	Takamitsu Kōno	January 23, 2015	December 27, 2016
53	"Yo-kai Dromp"; Transliteration: "Yōkai Daidarabotchi" (Japanese: 妖怪だいだらぼっち)	Takamitsu Kōno	January 23, 2015	December 27, 2016
Jibanyan is ready to tell Nate that he is Rubeus J, but finds that there is such thing as Rubeus J does. Venoct defeats Rubeus J only to hear about a new villain, the Boss Yo-kai Mighty Dog, whose description sounds like Komasan. Later, Nate and Whisper try to head home to watch a new episode of Professor Vacant but finds he has been trapped in a maze set up by the Yo-kai Dromp.
54	"Old Lady Dream Theater: Act I"; Transliteration: "Yōkai Mukashibanashi ~Kaguya-hime~" (Japanese: 妖怪むかし話 ～かぐや姫～)	Keiichirō Ōchi	January 30, 2015	December 28, 2016
54	"Yo-kai Gutsy bones" Transliteration: "Yōkai Gachadokuro" (Japanese: 妖怪ガシャどくろ)	Keiichirō Ōchi	January 30, 2015	December 28, 2016
54	"Yo-kai Furdinand"; Transliteration: "Yōkai Fusafusan" (Japanese: 妖怪ふさふさん)	Keiichirō Ōchi	January 30, 2015	December 28, 2016
A mysterious granny comes along and tells Nate and Komasan the legend of Princess Kaguya, but it stars Old Man Jibanyan and Princess Whisper Kaguya, who becomes an astronaut. Nate enters a game of chance against the gachapon-controlling giant skeleton Boss Yo-kai Gutsy Bones. Nate finds that his hair is so long and fluffy, as is the hair of his friends, because of the Classic Yo-kai Furdinand.
55	"Old Lady Dream Theater: Act II"; Transliteration: "Yōkai Mukashibanashi ~Momotarō~" (Japanese: 妖怪むかし話 ～桃太郎～)	Yōichi Katō	February 6, 2015	December 29, 2016
55	"For Love or Chocolate"; Transliteration: "Barentain Shin Jidai" (Japanese: バレンタイン新時代)	Yōichi Katō	February 6, 2015	December 29, 2016
The same granny from before tells the story of Momotarō. Later, Nate, Bear, and Eddie hold a contest to see who can get the most chocolates from the girls.
56	"Old Lady Dream Theater: Act III"; Transliteration: "Yōkai Mukashibanashi ~Tsuru no Ongaeshi~" (Japanese: 妖怪むかし話 ～ツルのおんがえし～)	Natsuko Takahashi	February 13, 2015	December 30, 2016
56	"Yo-kai Wantston"; Transliteration: "Yōkai Urayamashirō" (Japanese: 妖怪うらやましろう)	Natsuko Takahashi	February 13, 2015	December 30, 2016
56	"Yo-kai Pupsicle"; Transliteration: "Yōkai Samugari" (Japanese: 妖怪さむガリ)	Natsuko Takahashi	February 13, 2015	December 30, 2016
As before, the granny tells her take on the Crane's Return of a Favor. The jealous Yo-kai Wantston makes Nate jealous of every little thing he sees. Katie keeps chuckling at cold jokes, and Nate discovers it is because of the Yo-kai Pupsicle.
57	"Old Lady Dream Theater: Act IV " Transliteration: "Yōkai Mukashibanashi ~Urashima Tarō~" (Japanese: 妖怪むかし話 ～浦島太郎～)	Yuka Yamada	February 20, 2015	January 21, 2017
57	"Yo-kai Daiz"; Transliteration: "Yōkai Bōbō" (Japanese: 妖怪ボー坊)	Yuka Yamada	February 20, 2015	January 21, 2017
57	"Yo-kai Cap n Crash"; Transliteration: "Yōkai Daikōkai-senchō" (Japanese: 妖怪大後悔船長)	Yuka Yamada	February 20, 2015	January 21, 2017
In the style of the last 3 episodes, the granny tells the tale of Urashima Tarō. During class, the Yo-kai Daiz causes everyone to space out all at once. Lately, whenever Nate makes a decision, the evil Boss Yo-kai Cap n' Crash makes him regret it.
58	"Yo-kai Gimme"; Transliteration: "Yōkai Dorobokkun" (Japanese: 妖怪泥ボックン)	Takamitsu Kōno	February 27, 2015	January 28, 2017
58	"Yo-kai Tublappa"; Transliteration: "Yōkai Akaname" (Japanese: 妖怪あかなめ)	Takamitsu Kōno	February 27, 2015	January 28, 2017
58	"Kaptain Komasan!"; Transliteration: "Ketsusei! Komasan Tankentai!" (Japanese: 結成！コマさん探検隊！)	Takamitsu Kōno	February 27, 2015	January 28, 2017
When Nate loses things left to right, he finds that the Yo-kai Gimme has been stealing them. Later on, the Classic Yo-kai Tublappa gives Nate an uncontrollable urge to lick things. While visiting a museum, Komasan and Komajiro are cast by a reality TV show director to become an exploration team.
59	"Kaptain Komasan and the Mess at Loch Ness"; Transliteration: "Kin'yō Supesharu! Komasan Tankentai! Kodai Kyōryū no Ikinokori ka!? Nesu-Ko no Densetsu ga Kon'ya, Sono Bēru o Nugu! Tettei Sōsaku! "Nesshī" wa Jitsuzai-shita!" (Japanese: 金妖スペシャル！コマさん探検隊！古代恐竜の生き残りか！？ネス湖の伝説が今夜、そのベールを脱ぐ！徹底捜索！『ネッシー』は実在した！)	Keiichirō Ōchi	March 6, 2015	February 4, 2017
59	"Yo-kai Master Oden"; Transliteration: "Yōkai Odenjin" (Japanese: 妖怪おでんじん)	Keiichirō Ōchi	March 6, 2015	February 4, 2017
59	"Yo-kai Suspicioni"; Transliteration: "Yōkai Gishinanki" (Japanese: 妖怪ぎしんあん鬼)	Keiichirō Ōchi	March 6, 2015	February 4, 2017
On the exploration team, Komasan and Komajiro look for the sea creature "Nessie". While Komasan is amazed, Komajiro notices how the encounter is all staged. At home, the Yo-kai Master Oden keeps Nate from having dinner until he hears a truly stinging story. Nate notices how Eddie is suspecting everyone around him, and finds out the Yo-kai Suspicioni is to blame.
60	"Kaptain Komasan and the Kaveman"; Transliteration: "Kin'yō Supesharu! Komasan Tankentai! Kanzen Tōha, Kyōfu no Janguru Amazon Okuchi Sanzen Kiro! Nazo no Genshi Chōjin 'Danota Tsusan'o' wa Jitsuzai-shita!" (Japanese: 金妖スペシャル！コマさん探検隊！完全踏破 恐怖のジャングル・アマゾン奥地3000キロ！謎の原始超人『ダノタ・ツサンオ』は実在した！)	Yōichi Katō	March 13, 2015	February 11, 2017
60	"The Disturbing Life of Toiletta"; Transliteration: "Chikagoro no Toire no Hanako-san" (Japanese: 近頃のトイレの花子さん)	Yōichi Katō	March 13, 2015	February 11, 2017
60	"Yo-kai Copperled"; Transliteration: "Yōkai Shikirunja" (Japanese: 妖怪しきるん蛇)	Yōichi Katō	March 13, 2015	February 11, 2017
Nate hears a legend about Toiletta of the Toilet, and checks it out for himself. Then, the Yo-kai Copperled makes Eddie act bossy to those around him.
61	"Kaptain Komasan and the Alien"; Transliteration: "Kin'yō Supesharu! Komasan Tankentai! Yū Esu Ē Shakunetsu Sabaku no Hate! Gun Himitsu Kichi Eria Go! Dorometeusu Seiun kara no Shisha! 'Gurei Nna-gō Seijin' o Oe!" (Japanese: 金妖スペシャル！コマさん探検隊！USA灼熱砂漠の果て！軍秘密基地エリア51！ドロメテウス星雲からの使者！『グレイ7号星人』を追え！)	Yuka Yamada	March 20, 2015	February 18, 2017
61	"Yo-kai Enduriphant"; Transliteration: "Yōkai Gamanmosu" (Japanese: 妖怪ガマンモス)	Yuka Yamada	March 20, 2015	February 18, 2017
61	"Yo-kai Wydeawake"; Transliteration: "Yōkai TETSUYA" (Japanese: 妖怪TETSUYA)	Yuka Yamada	March 20, 2015	February 18, 2017
While competing on a game show, Nate has the Yo-kai Enduriphant help him with withstanding the challenges. Nate tries to stay up all night with help from the Yo-kai Wydeawake.
62	"Kaptain Komasan and the Merman"; Transliteration: "Kin'yō Supesharu! Komasan Tankentai! Midori no Makyō Amazon no Okuchi e! Densetsu no Hangyojin "Gyoppīara" o Oe!" (Japanese: 金妖スペシャル！コマさん探検隊！緑の魔境・アマゾンの奥地へ！伝説の半魚人『ギョッピアーラ』を追え！)	Natsuko Takahashi	March 27, 2015	February 25, 2017
62	"Burly Blasters"; Transliteration: "Tatakae! Yōkai Wotchi Basutāzu" (Japanese: 戦え！妖怪ウォッチバスターズ！)	Natsuko Takahashi	March 27, 2015	February 25, 2017
62	"Yo-kai Infour"; Transliteration: "Yōkai Yotsume" (Japanese: 妖怪よつめ)	Natsuko Takahashi	March 27, 2015	February 25, 2017
Sergeant Burly attempts to train Nate, Whisper, and Jibanyan to fight Gargaros in the Terror Time, but to no avail. Nate meets the Yo-kai Infour, who can sense a person's name, birthday, favorite food, and fated partner.
63	"Kaptain Komasan and the Buried Treasure"; Transliteration: "Kin'yō Supesharu! Koma-san Tankentai! Shijō Saidai no Rekishi Misuterī! Yukute o Habamu Nazo no Shūdan! Tettei Sōsaku! "Bakufu Maizōkin" ga Ima Sono Zenbō o Arawasu!" (Japanese: 金妖スペシャル！コマさん探検隊！史上最大の歴史ミステリー！行く手を阻む謎の集団！徹底捜索！『幕府埋蔵金』がいま、その全貌を現す！)	Keiichirō Ōchi	April 3, 2015	April 1, 2017
63	"Yo-kai April Fools"; Transliteration: "Yōkai Eipuriru Fūru" (Japanese: 妖怪エイプリルフール)	Keiichirō Ōchi	April 3, 2015	April 1, 2017
63	"Yo-kai Snartle"; Transliteration: "Yōkai Namahage" (Japanese: 妖怪なまはげ)	Keiichirō Ōchi	April 3, 2015	April 1, 2017
Whisper, Jibanyan, Hidabat, Blazion, and Roughraff compete in "Hellish Yo-kai April Fools". Later, Nate helps the Classic Yo-kai Snartle find a way to scare children without breaking the law.
64	"Kaptain Komasan and the Yeti"; Transliteration: "Kin'yō Supesharu! Koma-san Tankentai! Mōi no Burizādo! Himaraya Kanzen Tōha no Hate ni, Densetsu no Yukiotoko 'Yēiti' o Mita!" (Japanese: 金妖スペシャル！コマさん探検隊！猛威のブリザード！ヒマラヤ完全踏破の果てに、伝説の雪男『イエ～イティ』を見た！)	Takamitsu Kōno	April 10, 2015	March 4, 2017
64	"Yo-kai Bruff"; Transliteration: "Yōkai Aniki" (Japanese: 妖怪アニ鬼)	Takamitsu Kōno	April 10, 2015	March 4, 2017
64	"Yo-kai Dummkap"; Transliteration: "Yōkai Bakazukin" (Japanese: 妖怪ばか頭巾)	Takamitsu Kōno	April 10, 2015	March 4, 2017
A new student shows up at school, and the Yo-kai Bruff makes him a very reliable student. Nate and the boys in class find themselves doing stupid things (swinging water buckets, etc) because of the Yo-kai Dummkap.
65	"Kaptain Komasan and the Surprise Ending"; Transliteration: "Kin'yō Supesharu! Koma-san Tankentai Saishūkai Kuru ka Kuru ka to wa Omotteita ga! Yappari Otozureta Shōgeki no Ketsumatsu! 'Yarase-direkutā' Saigo no Hi!" (Japanese: 金妖スペシャル！コマさん探検隊 最終回 来るか来るかとは思っていたが！やっぱり訪れた衝撃の結末！『矢良瀬ディレクター』最後の日！)	Yōichi Katō	April 17, 2015	April 8, 2017
65	"Sour Milk?"; Transliteration: "Densetsu no Gyūnyū Zōkin" (Japanese: 伝説の牛乳ぞうきん)	Yōichi Katō	April 17, 2015	April 8, 2017
The news has revealed the director of Komasan's expedition to be bogus, but he really did have good intentions. While in class, the Yo-kai Cuttincheez makes the smell from a milk cloth unbearable for the classroom.
66	"Gnervous Gnomey"; Transliteration: "Shinkeishitsu na Zashiki-warashi" (Japanese: 神経質なざしきわらし)	Yuka Yamada	April 24, 2015	March 11, 2017
66	"Yo-kai Lafalotta"; Transliteration: "Yōkai Waraenee" (Japanese: 妖怪わらえ姉)	Yuka Yamada	April 24, 2015	March 11, 2017
66	"Dog Days"; Transliteration: "Inu Jikan" (Japanese: 犬時間)	Yuka Yamada	April 24, 2015	March 11, 2017
The Classic Yo-kai Gnomey lives in people's homes and secretly cleans up after them. The Yo-kai Lafalotta teaches Nate how to be funny to impress his classmates. Nate is given a mysterious box and told, "Don't you dare open it!", but when he does, he is turned into a dog.
67	"Gnumerous Gnomey;"; Transliteration: "Miritarī na Zashiki-warashi" (Japanese: ミリタリーなざしきわらし)	Natsuko Takahashi	May 1, 2015	March 18, 2017
67	"Katie's Yo-kai Butler"; Transliteration: "Goshujin-sama wa Fumi-chan" (Japanese: ご主人様はフミちゃん)	Natsuko Takahashi	May 1, 2015	March 18, 2017
A squadron of Gnomey attempt to get a test cancelled in favor of Nate and his friends. Later on, Whisper has a dream where Katie is his master instead of Nate.
68	"Gnarly Gnomey;"; Transliteration: "Donna Toki mo Inochigake no Zashiki-warashi" (Japanese: どんな時も命がけのざしきわらし)	Keiichirō Ōchi	May 8, 2015	March 25, 2017
68	"Yo-kai Negasus;"; Transliteration: "Yōkai Magasasu" (Japanese: 妖怪魔ガサス)	Keiichirō Ōchi	May 8, 2015	March 25, 2017
68	"Pho-Nate"; Transliteration: "Nise Kēta Arawaru!" (Japanese: にせケータあらわる！)	Keiichirō Ōchi	May 8, 2015	March 25, 2017
While the boys are hanging out together, the daredevil Yo-kai Gnomey tries to make sure the playdate is a success. At school, the Yo-kai Negasus makes Katie do bad things, then regret them. Mimikin is now able to look like anyone he meets, including Nate.
69	"Gnew Guy Gnomey"; Transliteration: "Shinjin no Zashiki-warashi" (Japanese: 新人のざしきわらし)	Takamitsu Kōno	May 15, 2015	April 15, 2017
69	"Yo-kai Mynimo"; Transliteration: "Yōkai Ekohiiki" (Japanese: 妖怪えこひい鬼)	Takamitsu Kōno	May 15, 2015	April 15, 2017
69	"Yo-kai Grumples"; Transliteration: "Yōkai Shiwaku-chan" (Japanese: 妖怪しわくちゃん)	Takamitsu Kōno	May 15, 2015	April 15, 2017
At school, the Yo-kai Mynimo possesses Katie making her favored by the teacher, later Nate is possessed as well. The Yo-kai Grumples makes everything in Nate's room crumpled and wrinkled, but after an intense beauty treatment, she changes into Everfore.
70	"Gnew Guy Gnomey: The Exam Episode"; Transliteration: "Shinjin no Zashiki-warashi: Juken-hen" (Japanese: 新人のざしきわらし 受験編)	Yuka Yamada	May 22, 2015	April 22, 2017
70	"Yo-kai Wotchagot"; Transliteration: "Yōkai Urayameshi" (Japanese: 妖怪うらや飯)	Yuka Yamada	May 22, 2015	April 22, 2017
70	"Hidabat's Secret"; Transliteration: "Hikikōmori no Himitsu" (Japanese: ヒキコウモリのヒミツ)	Yuka Yamada	May 22, 2015	April 22, 2017
While at a restaurant, Nate's parents are possessed by the Yo-kai Wotchagot, who makes them eat other people's food. Later, Hidabat reveals that he is the second richest Yo-kai in the world.
71	"Gnew Guy Gnomey: The Love Episode"; Transliteration: "Shinjin no Zashiki-warashi: Ren-ai-hen" (Japanese: 新人のざしきわらし 恋愛編)	Yōichi Katō	May 29, 2015	April 29, 2017
71	"A Yo-kai Holiday!"; Transliteration: "Kyō wa Yōkai Horidē!" (Japanese: きょうは妖怪ホリデー！)	Yōichi Katō	May 29, 2015	April 29, 2017
71	"The High-Fright Zone"; Transliteration: "Kowairaito Zōn ~Shiroi Kyōfu~" (Japanese: こわいライトゾーン ～白い恐怖～)	Yōichi Katō	May 29, 2015	April 29, 2017
Nate faces off against Snottle again, but cannot summon any Yo-kai due to it being a Yo-kai Holiday. In the style of The Twilight Zone, Nate's fear of going to the dentist causes him to have strange hallucinations, only for his cavity to be caused by Count Cavity.
72	"Yo-kai Greesel"; Transliteration: "Yōkai Dokechingu" (Japanese: 妖怪ドケチング)	Natsuko Takahashi	June 5, 2015	May 6, 2017
72	"Yo-kai Bowminos"; Transliteration: "Yōkai Ayamaritaoshi" (Japanese: 妖怪あやまり倒し)	Natsuko Takahashi	June 5, 2015	May 6, 2017
72	"Yo-kai No-Go Cart"; Transliteration: "Yōkai Mayoiguruma" (Japanese: 妖怪迷い車)	Natsuko Takahashi	June 5, 2015	May 6, 2017
The cheapskate Yo-kai Greesel makes Nate's mother cut back on everything. Later at school, Eddie is possessed by Bowminos causing him to apologize profusely. While on a road trip to a cherry harvest, the Yo-kai No-Go Kart makes Nate's father confused as to where he's going.
73	"Yo-kai Irewig"; Transliteration: "Yōkai Mukamukade" (Japanese: 妖怪ムカムカデ)	Takamitsu Kōno	June 12, 2015	May 13, 2017
73	"Yo-kai Mermaidyn"; Transliteration: "Yōkai Ningyo" (Japanese: 妖怪にんぎょ)	Takamitsu Kōno	June 12, 2015	May 13, 2017
73	"Yo-kai Gush"; Transliteration: "Yōkai Tararin" (Japanese: 妖怪たらりん)	Takamitsu Kōno	June 12, 2015	May 13, 2017
Nate's mother is possessed by Irewig, who makes her ticked off at every little thing she sees. While on a fishing outing, Nate is somehow always catching the Classic mermaid Yo-kai Mermaidyn. During art class, Nate's painting is always ruined by just one drop of paint, and he discovers that the Yo-kai Gush is to blame.
74	"Country Folk'll Try Anything Once: The Electronics Store"; Transliteration: "Komasan to Iku ~Hajimete no Kaden Ryōhan-ten~" (Japanese: コマさんといく ～はじめての家電量販店～)	Yōichi Katō	June 19, 2015	May 20, 2017
74	"Make Vroom for Lil' Swirlie"; Transliteration: "Kuro ga Kita!" (Japanese: クロがきた！)	Yōichi Katō	June 19, 2015	May 20, 2017
74	"Robonyan... Type-F!"; Transliteration: "Robonyan Efu-gata Arawaru!" (Japanese: ロボニャンF型あらわる！)	Yōichi Katō	June 19, 2015	May 20, 2017
After hearing that his mother is coming over to visit, Komasan decides he wants to be able to show her around. He starts off by visiting an electronics superstore, only to bring home an automated vacuum cleaner (a la iRobot Roomba). While dealing with Snottle once again, the fellas and Robonyan meet the latter's upgraded form: Robonyan F.
75	"Country Folk'll Try Anything Once: The Ramen Stand"; Transliteration: "Komasan to Iku ~Hajimete no Rāmen-yasan~" (Japanese: コマさんといく ～はじめてのラーメン屋さん～)	Keiichirō Ōchi	June 26, 2015	May 27, 2017
75	"Yo-kai Shrook"; Transliteration: "Yōkai Tōshirozame" (Japanese: 妖怪トーシロザメ)	Keiichirō Ōchi	June 26, 2015	May 27, 2017
75	"Yo-kai Chansin"; Transliteration: "Yōkai Shōbushi" (Japanese: 妖怪しょうブシ)	Keiichirō Ōchi	June 26, 2015	May 27, 2017
Komasan decides to try one of the ramen stands in town. At a street performers' festival, the Yo-kai Shrook makes the performers unable to do what they're known for. Later, the unlucky Yo-kai Chansin causes people to almost, but not quite, win at anything they try.
76	"Country Folk'll Try Anything Once: The Gym"; Transliteration: "Komasan to Iku ~Hajimete no Supōtsu Jimu~" (Japanese: コマさんといく ～はじめてのスポーツジム～)	Yuka Yamada	July 3, 2015	June 3, 2017
76	"Yo-kai Rawry"; Transliteration: "Yōkai Bakuonnarashi" (Japanese: 妖怪爆音ならし)	Yuka Yamada	July 3, 2015	June 3, 2017
76	"Pandle-monium"; Transliteration: "Buyōjin Samā Fesu" (Japanese: ぶようじんサマーフェス)	Yuka Yamada	July 3, 2015	June 3, 2017
After hearing about a local sports gym that his mother wants to go to, Komasan wants to try it out for himself. One of Nate's new neighbors is being obnoxiously loud because of the Yo-kai Rawry. Nate discovers that all of the Pandle in the world are gathered up at his school.

=== Season 2 (2015–16) ===
No.	English dub title/Original translated title Original Japanese title	Written by	Original airdate	English airdate
77	"Usapyon Is Here!"; Transliteration: "Usapyon ga kita!" (Japanese: USAピョンが来た！)	Akihiro Hino	July 10, 2015	July 2, 2018
Hailey Anne Thomas, a space fanatic around Nate's age, purchases a Space Watch (actually a Yo-kai Watch Model U Prototype) from her local anime shop. Using the watch, she meets Usapyon, whom she first thinks is an alien, but is disappointed to learn he's a Merican Yo-kai. Usapyon explains to Hailey Anne his predicament involving his former master, a rocket engineer at NASA (National Space Center in the English Dub).
78	"A New Yo-kai Watch!"; Transliteration: "Atarashii Wotchi!" (Japanese: 新しいウォッチ！)	Yōichi Katō	July 17, 2015	July 9, 2018
78	"Hailey Anne and Usapyon's Bitty RoKit Weekly: The Engine!"; Transliteration: "Inaho to Usapyon no Roketto Chibichibi Kumitatēru 1 ~Enjin-hen~" (Japanese: イナホとUSAピョンのロケットチビチビクミタテール① ～エンジン編～)	Yōichi Katō	July 17, 2015	July 9, 2018
Nate receives the prototype Yo-kai Watch Model U Prototype, but the Merican Yo-kai Cornfused makes him unimpressed with the new features to make Whisper mad util Jibanyan find out. Meanwhile, Hailey Anne and Usapyon start on a weekly-magazine rocket project to help the latter's old master rediscover his dreams.
79	"Country Folk'll Try Anything Once: The Health Spa"; Transliteration: "Komasan to Iku ~Hajimete no Massāji~" (Japanese: コマさんといく ～はじめてのマッサージ～)	Natsuko Takahashi	July 24, 2015	July 16, 2018
79	"The Infamous Beach Story: Oh, It's Roughraff"; Transliteration: "Natsu da, Umi da, Yōkai da! Gurerurin-hen" (Japanese: 夏だ、海だ、妖怪だ！ グレるりん編)	Natsuko Takahashi	July 24, 2015	July 16, 2018
79	"The Infamous Beach Story, Part 2: Yo-kai Swosh"; Transliteration: "Natsu da, Umi da, Yōkai da! Umibōzu-hen" (Japanese: 夏だ、海だ、妖怪だ！ うみぼうず編)	Natsuko Takahashi	July 24, 2015	TBA
Komasan hears about a masseur with the "hands of a god" and decides to go see him. But the masseur is surprised that he can't find Komasan's tense spot. Meanwhile, Nate and his friends try to have fun at the beach, but the day is plagued by the Yo-kai Roughraff and Swosh.
80	"Country Folk'll Try Anything Once: The Pottery Studio"; Transliteration: "Komasan to Iku ~Hajimete no Dōgei Kyōshitsu~" (Japanese: コマさんといく ～はじめての陶芸教室～)	Yōichi Katō	July 31, 2015	July 23, 2018
80	"Hailey Anne and Usapyon's Bitty RoKit Weekly: The Fuel Cell!"; Transliteration: "Inaho to Usapyon no Roketto Chibichibi Kumitatēru 2 ~Nenryōdenchi-hen~" (Japanese: イナホとUSAピョンのロケットチビチビクミタテール② ～燃料電池編～)	Yōichi Katō	July 31, 2015	July 23, 2018
80	"High-Fright Zone: Shadow in the Dark"; Transliteration: "Kowai Raito Zōn ~Yami ni Hisomu Kage~" (Japanese: こわいライトゾーン ～闇に潜む影～)	Yōichi Katō	July 31, 2015	July 23, 2018
After hearing how making pottery is a popular hobby, Komasan decides to try it out for himself. With Nate, Whisper, and the former's parents out shopping, Jibanyan finally has the entire house to himself, but in the style of The Twilight Zone, he is always freaking out over the slightest sound. Note: The US broadcast of this episode censored the scene where USApyon shoots at Hailey Ann with his laser while in "Vader Mode".
81	"Cadin Goes to a Concert"; Transliteration: "Semimaru Raibu ni Iku!" (Japanese: セミまるライブに行く！)	Takamitsu Kōno	August 7, 2015	July 16, 2018 (A); TBA; July 30, 2018 (C)
81	"Rhinoggin and Beetler"; Transliteration: "Mushakabuto to Kuwanobushi" (Japanese: 武者かぶととクワノ武士)	Takamitsu Kōno	August 7, 2015	July 16, 2018 (A); TBA; July 30, 2018 (C)
81	"Yo-kai Swelterrier"; Transliteration: "Yōkai Atsugaruru" (Japanese: 妖怪あつガルル)	Takamitsu Kōno	August 7, 2015	July 16, 2018 (A); TBA; July 30, 2018 (C)
Cadin woke up from his year-long slumber to go see a Next HarMEOWny concert, only to find out it doesn't start for another week. Nate has to settle a dispute between the two bug-like Yo-kai Rhinoggin and Beetler over what kind of bug is more popular among children. At home, the Yo-kai Swelterrier makes the house too hot for the AC to keep up.
82	"Nate's Magnificent Dream"; Transliteration: "Keita no Sōdai na Yume" (Japanese: ケータの壮大な夢)	Keiichirō Ōchi	August 14, 2015	August 2, 2018
82	"Yo-kai Minochi"; Transliteration: "Yōkai Yakimochi" (Japanese: 妖怪やきモチ)	Keiichirō Ōchi	August 14, 2015	August 2, 2018
82	"Yo-kai Pittapat"; Transliteration: "Yōkai Bakezōri" (Japanese: 妖怪化け草履)	Keiichirō Ōchi	August 14, 2015	August 2, 2018
After being hit by Baku's sleep smoke, Nate has an epic space fantasy dream, but he keeps putting himself in minor roles. Later on, Nate believes Katie is jealous over everything he does, but finds out it's because of the Yo-kai Minochi. The Classic Yo-kai Pittapat asks Nate for help in apologizing to a little girl that the former pulled a prank on.
83	"Covert Shopping Mission"; Transliteration: "Kaimono wa Onmitsu Misshon" (Japanese: 買い物は隠密ミッション)	Yōichi Katō	August 21, 2015	August 6, 2018
83	"Hailey Anne and Usapyon's Bitty RoKit Weekly: The Cooling System!"; Transliteration: "Inaho to Usapyon no Roketto Chibichibi Kumitatēru 3 ~Reikiyakusōchi-hen~" (Japanese: イナホとUSAピョンのロケットチビチビクミタテール③ ～冷却装置編～)	Yōichi Katō	August 21, 2015	August 6, 2018
83	"Komasan Cab: Manjimutt"; Transliteration: "Komasan Takushī ~Jinmenken~" (Japanese: コマさんタクシー ～じんめん犬～)	Yōichi Katō	August 21, 2015	August 6, 2018
While grocery shopping with his mother, Nate asks Robonyan to make sure he isn't seen by his friends while still helping her out. A first look is taken at Komasan Taxi, where Komasan and Komajiro discuss characters' controversial actions, aided by fan letters, with that character; they start off with Manjimutt.
84	"Yo-kai Scritchy"; Transliteration: "Yōkai Kayukayu" (Japanese: 妖怪かゆかゆ)	Yuka Yamada	August 28, 2015	TBA; July 30, 2018 (C)
84	"Fidgephant Panic!"; Transliteration: "Morezō Panikku!" (Japanese: モレゾウパニック！)	Yuka Yamada	August 28, 2015	TBA; July 30, 2018 (C)
84	"Jibanyan's Summer Vacation"; Transliteration: "Jibanyan no Natsuyasumi" (Japanese: ジバニャンの夏休み)	Yuka Yamada	August 28, 2015	TBA; July 30, 2018 (C)
One night, Nate is disturbed by the mosquito Yo-kai Scritchy, and Robonyan then appears to reveal Scritchy's role in the future of mosquito-kind, a la The Terminator. While at a public pool, Nate discovers an entire army of Fidgephant disrupting the day off. After he trains on trucks, a more heartfelt side of Jibanyan is revealed as he helps a lost cat find its owner.
85	"Hailey Anne and Usapyon's Bitty RoKit Weekly: The Safety Device!"; Transliteration: "Inaho to Usapyon no Roketto Chibichibi Kumitatēru 4 ~Anzensōchi-hen~" (Japanese: イナホとUSAピョンのロケットチビチビクミタテール④ ～安全装置編～)	Natsuko Takahashi	September 4, 2015	August 13, 2018
85	"Yo-kai Pride Shrimp"; Transliteration: "Yōkai Puraidon" (Japanese: 妖怪プライ丼)	Natsuko Takahashi	September 4, 2015	August 13, 2018
85	"Komasan Cab: Robonyan"; Transliteration: "Komasan Takushī ~Robonyan~" (Japanese: コマさんタクシー ～ロボニャン～)	Natsuko Takahashi	September 4, 2015	August 13, 2018
During class cleanup, the proud Yo-kai Pride Shrimp complicates who does what by making Bear and Eddie argue over who gets to mop the room (they each want to do it).
86	"Yo-kai Frazzel"; Transliteration: "Yōkai Hiraishin" (Japanese: 妖怪ヒライ神)	Takamitsu Kōno	September 11, 2015	August 25, 2018
86	"Lie-in Heart and Cheeksqueek"; Transliteration: "Man'ojishi to Onarazumono" (Japanese: 万尾獅子とおならず者)	Takamitsu Kōno	September 11, 2015	August 25, 2018
86	"Komasan Cab: Poofessor"; Transliteration: "Komasan Takushī ~Unchikuma~" (Japanese: コマさんタクシー ～うんちく魔～)	Takamitsu Kōno	September 11, 2015	August 25, 2018
At home, the Yo-kai Papa Bolt gives Nate's mother a personality like a thunderstorm (booming down on each sly remark); at the same time, the Yo-kai Frazzle is causing Nate to make such sly remarks (causing literal lightning to strike him). Now, the family has to try to enjoy their dinner with not one, not two, but THREE Yo-kai at once. While at the local Hot Springs, Cheeksqueek once again hits Nate with gas.
87	"Yo-kai Timidevil"; Transliteration: "Yōkai Debibiru" (Japanese: 妖怪デビビル)	Keiichirō Ōchi	September 18, 2015	September 1, 2018
87	"Yo-kai Puppiccino"; Transliteration: "Yōkai Otonaburu" (Japanese: 妖怪おとなブル)	Keiichirō Ōchi	September 18, 2015	September 1, 2018
87	"Hailey Anne and Usapyon's Bitty RoKit Weekly: The Main Control"; Transliteration: "Inaho to Usapyon no Roketto Chibichibi Kumitatēru 5 ~Zunō-hen~" (Japanese: イナホとUSAピョンのロケットチビチビクミタテール⑤ ～頭脳編～)	Keiichirō Ōchi	September 18, 2015	September 1, 2018
88	"Hailey Anne and Usapyon's Bitty RoKit Weekly: The Launch!"; Transliteration: "Roketto ga Tobu Hi" (Japanese: ロケットが飛ぶ日)	Akihiro Hino	September 25, 2015	September 8, 2018
88	"Hapyon Detective Agency: Case No. 1: The Food Yo-kai Mystery"; Transliteration: "InaUsa Fushigi Tanteisha CASE1 Donmono Yōkai Renzoku Satsujin Jiken" (Japanese: イナウサ不思議探偵社 CASE1 丼もの妖怪連続殺人事件)	Akihiro Hino	September 25, 2015	September 8, 2018
89	"Hapyon Detective Agency: Case No. 2: Who Licked My Ice Cream!?"; Transliteration: "InaUsa Fushigi Tanteisha CASE2 Sofutokurīmu Hitokajiri Jiken" (Japanese: イナUSA不思議探偵社 CASE2 ソフトクリームひとかじり事件)	Yuka Yamada	October 2, 2015	September 15, 2018
89	"Yo-kai Mistank"; Transliteration: "Yōkai Dassensha" (Japanese: 妖怪だっせんしゃ)	Yuka Yamada	October 2, 2015	September 15, 2018
89	"Yo-kai Slumberhog"; Transliteration: "Yōkai Nebuta" (Japanese: 妖怪寝ブタ)	Yuka Yamada	October 2, 2015	September 15, 2018
90	"Yo-kai Lazy Sundae"; Transliteration: "Yōkai Sandēpapa" (Japanese: 妖怪サンデーパパ)	Natsuko Takahashi	October 9, 2015	September 22, 2018
90	"Yo-kai Flushback"; Transliteration: "Yōkai Omoidasuppon" (Japanese: 妖怪おもいだスッポン)	Natsuko Takahashi	October 9, 2015	September 22, 2018
90	"Komasan Cab: Dracunyan"; Transliteration: "Komasan Takushī ~Gabunyan~" (Japanese: コマさんタクシー ～ガブニャン～)	Natsuko Takahashi	October 9, 2015	September 22, 2018
91	"Let's Sing Together! Yo-kai Red and White Song Battle!"; Transliteration: "Minna de Utaou! Yōkai Kōhaku Uta Gassen!" (Japanese: みんなで歌おう！妖怪紅白歌合戦！)	Yōichi Katō	October 16, 2015	TBA
Nate attends a Song Battle concert hosted by Komasan and Komajiro. Whisper attempts to form music groups so that he can compete.
92	"Hapyon Detective Agency: Case No. 3: Count Zapaway Mystery"; Transliteration: "InaUsa Fushigi Tanteisha CASE3 Rimokon Yōkai Satsujin Jiken" (Japanese: イナウサ不思議探偵社 CASE3 リモコン妖怪殺人事件)	Takamitsu Kōno	October 23, 2015	September 29, 2018
92	"Yo-kai Putasockinit"; Transliteration: "Yōkai Dasokkusu" (Japanese: 妖怪ダソックス)	Takamitsu Kōno	October 23, 2015	September 29, 2018
92	"Yo-kai Rinsin Repete"; Transliteration: "Yōkai Taraimawashi" (Japanese: 妖怪たらいまわし)	Takamitsu Kōno	October 23, 2015	September 29, 2018
93	"Hapyon Detective Agency: Case No. 4: Gloomy Yo-kai Mystery"; Transliteration: "InaUsa Fushigi Tanteisha CASE4 Jimikei Yōkai Renzoku Satsujin Jiken" (Japanese: イナウサ不思議探偵社 CASE4 地味系妖怪連続殺人事件)	Keiichirō Ōchi	October 30, 2015	October 6, 2018 (A); TBA; October 6, 2018 (C)
93	"Momonyan and His Three Attendants"; Transliteration: "Momotaronyan to Sanbiki no Otomo" (Japanese: モモタロニャンと三匹のお供)	Keiichirō Ōchi	October 30, 2015	October 6, 2018 (A); TBA; October 6, 2018 (C)
93	"The Classic Yo-kai Halloween"; Transliteration: "Koten Yōkai Harowin Pātī!" (Japanese: 古典妖怪ハロウィンパーティー！)	Keiichirō Ōchi	October 30, 2015	October 6, 2018 (A); TBA; October 6, 2018 (C)
94	"Hapyon Detective Agency: Case No. 5: The Curious Case of the Serial Nose-Picker"; Transliteration: "InaUsa Fushigi Tanteisha CASE5 Hanahoji Renzoku Satsujin Jiken" (Japanese: イナウサ不思議探偵社 CASE5 はなほじ妖怪連続殺人事件)	Yuka Yamada	November 6, 2015	October 13, 2018
94	"Yo-kai OMGator"; Transliteration: "Yōkai Ottamagētā§" (Japanese: 妖怪オッタマゲーター)	Yuka Yamada	November 6, 2015	October 13, 2018
94	"Shogunyan Chops!"; Transliteration: "Kataimono ga Kiritai Bushinyan" (Japanese: カタいものが斬りたいブシニャン)	Yuka Yamada	November 6, 2015	October 13, 2018
95	"Dog of the North Star: Episode 1"; Transliteration: "Hokuto no Ken Dai-Ichi-Wa" (Japanese: 北斗の犬 第1話)	Takamitsu Kōno	November 13, 2015	TBA; October 20, 2018 (B); TBA
95	"Hapyon Detective Agency: Case No. 6: Assault of the Thorny Yo-kai"; Transliteration: "InaUsa Fushigi Tanteisha CASE6 Togetoge Yōkai Shūgeki Jiken" (Japanese: イナウサ不思議探偵社 CASE6 トゲトゲ妖怪襲撃事件)	Takamitsu Kōno	November 13, 2015	TBA; October 20, 2018 (B); TBA
95	"Yo-kai Rocky Badboya"; Transliteration: "Yōkai Annojō" (Japanese: 妖怪あんのジョー)	Takamitsu Kōno	November 13, 2015	TBA; October 20, 2018 (B); TBA
96	"Dog of the North Star: Episode 2"; Transliteration: "Hokuto no Ken Dai-Ni-Wa" (Japanese: 北斗の犬 第2話)	Natsuko Takahashi	November 20, 2015	TBA; October 27, 2018 (B & C)
96	"Yo-kai Disliking"; Transliteration: "Yōkai Jikoken'ō" (Japanese: 妖怪じこけん王)	Natsuko Takahashi	November 20, 2015	TBA; October 27, 2018 (B & C)
96	"Hapyon Detective Agency vs. Carl San Fantastico: The National Plate"; Transliteration: "InaUsa Fushigi Tanteisha VS Kaitō Kopan Nerawareta Kokuhō-kyū no Sara" (Japanese: イナウサ不思議探偵社VS怪盗コパン ねらわれた国宝級の皿)	Natsuko Takahashi	November 20, 2015	TBA; October 27, 2018 (B & C)
97	"Dog of the North Star: Episode 3"; Transliteration: "Hokuto no Ken Dai-San-Wa" (Japanese: 北斗の犬 第3話)	Keiichirō Ōchi	November 27, 2015	TBA; October 20, 2018 (B); TBD
97	"Mundane Mystery Investigators vs The Phantom Thief: The Red Treasure"; Transliteration: "InaUsa Fushigi Tanteisha VS Kaitō Kopan Nerawareta Aka no Hihō" (Japanese: イナウサ不思議探偵社VS怪盗コパン ねらわれた赤の秘宝)	Keiichirō Ōchi	November 27, 2015	TBA; October 20, 2018 (B); TBD
97	"Yo-kai Lil' Kappa"; Transliteration: "Yōkai Kapā" (Japanese: 妖怪カッパー)	Keiichirō Ōchi	November 27, 2015	TBA; October 20, 2018 (B); TBD
After his fiery mane gets stolen, Hailey Anne and Usapyon must restore Blazion's passion. Meanwhile, Nate and Whisper learn that Walkappa has been taken in by the Yo-kai rapper Lil' Kappa to form a musical group.
98	"Christmas Blackout!; Time for a Yo-kai Watch Upgrade"; Transliteration: "Kurisumasu Daiteiden! Yōkai Wotchi o Kōshin seyo!" (Japanese: クリスマス大停電！妖怪ウォッチを更新せよ！)	Yōichi Katō	December 11, 2015	November 3, 2018
SP1	"Super-Deluxe Edition Yo-kai Watch #1! The Movie's First TV Broadcast!"; Transliteration: "Chōgōkaban Yōkai Wotchi Dai-Ichi-Dan! Eiga Chijōha Hatsu Hōsō!" (Japanese: 超豪華版妖怪ウォッチ第1弾! 映画地上波初放送!)	TBA	December 18, 2015	TBA
A two-and-a-half-hour special featuring Tetsuya Takeda and Nyanpachi Sensei to celebrate the first TV broadcast of Yo-kai Watch: Tanjō no Himitsu da Nyan!.
SP2	"Super-Deluxe Edition Yo-kai Watch #2! Monge, It's a Two-Hour Special, Zura!"; Transliteration: "Chōgōkaban Yōkai Wotchi Dai-Ni-Dan! Mongē Nijikan Supesharu zura!" (Japanese: 超豪華版妖怪ウォッチ第2弾! もんげー2時間スペシャルズラ!)	TBA	December 25, 2015	TBA
A two-hour special broadcast of a Christmas special featuring Komasan as well as the back-to-back broadcasts of episodes 99, 100, and 101.
99	"Dog of the North Star: Episode 4"; Transliteration: "Hokuto no Ken Dai-Yon-Wa" (Japanese: 北斗の犬 第4話)	Yuka Yamada	December 25, 2015	TBA
99	"Hapyon Detective Agency vs. Carl San Fantastico: The Magic Mirror"; Transliteration: "InaUsa Fushigi Tanteisha VS Kaitō Kopan Nerawareta Mashō no Kagami" (Japanese: イナウサ不思議探偵社VS怪盗コパン ねらわれた魔性の鏡)	Yuka Yamada	December 25, 2015	TBA
99	"Yo-kai Statikid"; Transliteration: "Yōkai Seidenki" (Japanese: 妖怪せいでん鬼)	Yuka Yamada	December 25, 2015	TBA
100	"Nate's Secret Past"; Transliteration: "Keita no Shirareru Monogatari" (Japanese: ケータの知られざる物語)	Yōichi Katō	December 25, 2015	November 17, 2018
100	"Whisper's Secret Past"; Transliteration: "Whisper no Shirareru Monogatari" (Japanese: ウィスパーの知られざる物語)	Yōichi Katō	December 25, 2015	November 17, 2018
100	"Jibanyan's Secret Past"; Transliteration: "Jibanyan Tanjō no Himitsu da Nyan!" (Japanese: ジバニャン誕生の秘密だニャン！)	Yōichi Katō	December 25, 2015	November 17, 2018
101	"Dog of the North Star: Episode 5"; Transliteration: "Hokuto no Ken Dai-Go-Wa" (Japanese: 北斗の犬 第5話)	Takamitsu Kōno	December 25, 2015	TBA
101	"Hapyon Detective Agency vs. Carl San Fantastico: The Legendary Robe"; Transliteration: "InaUsa Fushigi Tanteisha VS Kaitō Kopan Nerawareta Densetsu no Koromo" (Japanese: イナウサ不思議探偵社VS怪盗コパン ねらわれた伝説の衣)	Takamitsu Kōno	December 25, 2015	TBA
101	"Yo-kai House Partay"; Transliteration: "Yōkai Iēi" (Japanese: 妖怪家ーイ)	Takamitsu Kōno	December 25, 2015	TBA
102	"The Yo-kai Also Have Otoshidama"; Transliteration: "Yōkai ni mo Otoshidama" (Japanese: 妖怪にもお年玉)	Keiichirō Ōchi	January 8, 2016	December 1, 2018 (A); TBA; December 1, 2018 (C & D)
102	"Dog of the North Star: Episode 6"; Transliteration: "Hokuto no Ken Dai-Roku-Wa" (Japanese: 北斗の犬 第6話)	Keiichirō Ōchi	January 8, 2016	December 1, 2018 (A); TBA; December 1, 2018 (C & D)
102	"Yo-kai Kittylumbus"; Transliteration: "Yōkai Nekoronbusu" (Japanese: 妖怪寝コロンブス)	Keiichirō Ōchi	January 8, 2016	December 1, 2018 (A); TBA; December 1, 2018 (C & D)
102	"The InaUsa Mysterious Detective Agency vs. Phantom Thief Kopin: The Targeted Robes Whiter than Snow"; Transliteration: "InaUsa Fushigi Tanteisha VS Kaitō Kopan Nerawareta Yuki yori Shiroi Koromo" (Japanese: イナウサ不思議探偵社VS怪盗コパン ねらわれた雪より白い衣)	Keiichirō Ōchi	January 8, 2016	December 1, 2018 (A); TBA; December 1, 2018 (C & D)
Nate, Whisper, and Jibanyan get New Year's Otoshidamas. Komasan stars as Komashiro in the penultimate episode of Dog of the North Star. Nate, Whisper, and Jibanyan meet Kittylumbus. Hailey Anne and Usapyon try to find a good replacement for Mochismo's mochi.
103	"Dog of the North Star: Finale"; Transliteration: "Hokuto no Ken Saishūkai" (Japanese: 北斗の犬 最終回)	Yuka Yamada	January 15, 2016	TBA
103	"Multiplying Mudazukai"; Transliteration: "Mudazukai no Hanshoku" (Japanese: ムダヅカイの繁殖)	Yuka Yamada	January 15, 2016	TBA
103	"Yo-kai Throne Whiper"; Transliteration: "Yōkai Kamikakushi" (Japanese: 妖怪紙かくし)	Yuka Yamada	January 15, 2016	TBA
104	"The InaUsa Mysterious Detective Agency vs. Phantom Thief Kopin: The Targeted Golden Armor and Kopin's Identity!"; Transliteration: "InaUsa Fushigi Tanteisha VS Kaitō Kopan Nerawareta Ōgon no Yoroi to Kopan no Shōtai!" (Japanese: イナウサ不思議探偵社VS怪盗コパン ねらわれた黄金の鎧とコパンの正体！)	Natsuko Takahashi	January 22, 2016	December 8, 2018
104	"Yo-kai Nagatha"; Transliteration: "Yōkai Otsubone-sama" (Japanese: 妖怪おつぼね様)	Natsuko Takahashi	January 22, 2016	December 8, 2018
104	"Yo-kai Crook-a-doodle"; Transliteration: "Yōkai Inchikin" (Japanese: 妖怪おつぼね様)	Natsuko Takahashi	January 22, 2016	December 8, 2018
105	"Year 3 Class Y, Mr. Nyanpachi: Koshihikari Academy"; Transliteration: "San-nen Wai-gumi Nyanpachi-sensei Koshihikari Gakuen" (Japanese: 3年Y組ニャンパチ先生 コシヒカリ学園)	Takamitsu Kōno	January 29, 2016	TBA
105	"Evil Year 5 Class 1: Okane Nider Explodes!!"; Transliteration: "Ma no Go-nen Ichi-gumi ~Okanenaidā Daibakuhatsu!!~" (Japanese: 魔の5年1組 ～お金ナイダー 大爆発！！～)	Takamitsu Kōno	January 29, 2016	TBA
105	"Yo-kai Salty Bacon"; Transliteration: "Yōkai Karikaribēkon" (Japanese: 妖怪カリカリベーコン)	Takamitsu Kōno	January 29, 2016	TBA
106	"Year 3 Class Y, Mr. Nyanpachi: Hot-Blooded Flame Academy"; Transliteration: "San-nen Wai-gumi Nyanpachi-sensei Nekketsu Honō Gakuen" (Japanese: 3年Y組ニャンパチ先生 熱血炎学園)	Yuka Yamada	February 5, 2016	TBA
106	"Evil Year 5 Class 1: Unchikuma Goes to the Antarctic!!"; Transliteration: "Ma no Go-nen Ichi-gumi ~Unchikuma Nankyoku ni Shizumu!!~" (Japanese: 魔の5年1組 ～うんちく魔 南極に沈む！！～)	Yuka Yamada	February 5, 2016	TBA
106	"Yo-kai Nummskull"; Transliteration: "Yōkai Ponkotsu" (Japanese: 妖怪ポン骨)	Yuka Yamada	February 5, 2016	TBA
107	"Year 3 Class Y, Mr. Nyanpachi: Century's End Academy"; Transliteration: "San-nen Wai-gumi Nyanpachi-sensei Seikimatsu Gakuen" (Japanese: 3年Y組ニャンパチ先生 世紀末学園)	Keiichirō Ōchi	February 12, 2016	TBA; December 15, 2018 (B & C)
107	"Hailey Anne's Valentine"; Transliteration: "Inaho no Barentain" (Japanese: イナホのバレンタイン)	Keiichirō Ōchi	February 12, 2016	TBA; December 15, 2018 (B & C)
107	"Yo-kai Mr. Blockhead"; Transliteration: "Yōkai Kakusan" (Japanese: 妖怪カクさん)	Keiichirō Ōchi	February 12, 2016	TBA; December 15, 2018 (B & C)
Mr. Crabbycat teaches at Century's End Academy. Inaho makes chocolate for anime Sailor Piers popular villain Bah Guy. Rumors get spread like wildfires because of the Yo-kai Mr. Blockhead.
108	"Year 3 Class Y, Mr. Nyanpachi: Pitter-Patter Academy"; Transliteration: "San-nen Wai-gumi Nyanpachi-sensei Dokidoki Gakuen" (Japanese: 3年Y組ニャンパチ先生 ドキドキ学園)	Natsuko Takahashi	February 19, 2016	TBA
108	"Evil Year 5 Class 1: Gurerurin's Death at Sunset!!"; Transliteration: "Ma no Go-nen Ichi-gumi ~Gurerurin Yūhi ni Shisu!!~" (Japanese: 魔の5年1組 ～グレるりん 夕陽に死す！！～)	Natsuko Takahashi	February 19, 2016	TBA
108	"Yo-kai Chicken Chukket"; Transliteration: "Yōkai Marunagetto" (Japanese: 妖怪まるナゲット)	Natsuko Takahashi	February 19, 2016	TBA
109	"Year 3 Class Y, Mr. Nyanpachi: Meow Meow Academy"; Transliteration: "San-nen Wai-gumi Nyanpachi-sensei Nyan Nyan Gakuen" (Japanese: 3年Y組ニャンパチ先生 ニャンニャン学園)	Takamitsu Kōno	February 26, 2016	TBA
109	"Evil Year 5 Class 1: Sebastian's Great Ship Sinking!!"; Transliteration: "Ma no Go-nen Ichi-gumi ~Sebasuchan Daigōchin!!~" (Japanese: 魔の5年1組 ～セバスチャン 大轟沈！！～)	Takamitsu Kōno	February 26, 2016	TBA
109	"Yo-kai Housekeeper Got It Maid"; Transliteration: "Yōkai Kaseifu Gattenmaiyā" (Japanese: 妖怪家政婦ガッテンマイヤー)	Takamitsu Kōno	February 26, 2016	TBA
110	"Year 3 Class Y, Mr. Nyanpachi: Gyan Gyan Academy"; Transliteration: "San-nen Wai-gumi Nyanpachi-sensei Gyan Gyan Gakuen" (Japanese: 3年Y組ニャンパチ先生 ギャンギャン学園)	Yōichi Katō	March 4, 2016	TBA
110	"The Way Back Is Backpack Rock-Paper-Scissors!"; Transliteration: "Kaerimichi wa Randoseru Janken!" (Japanese: 帰り道はランドセルじゃんけん！)	Yōichi Katō	March 4, 2016	TBA
110	"Evil Year 5 Class 1: Netaballerina Sinks into the Sea of Knowledge!!"; Transliteration: "Ma no Go-nen Ichi-gumi ~Netabaerīna Chishiki no Umi ni Shizumu!!~" (Japanese: 魔の5年1組 ～ネタバレリーナ 知識の海に沈む！！～)	Yōichi Katō	March 4, 2016	TBA
111	"Year 3 Class Y, Mr. Nyanpachi: Slicing Academy"; Transliteration: "San-nen Wai-gumi Nyanpachi-sensei Kirekkire Gakuen" (Japanese: 3年Y組ニャンパチ先生 キレッキレ学園)	Yuka Yamada	March 11, 2016	TBA
111	"Evil Year 5 Class 1: Negativoon and Tohohogisu's Crying Friendship!!"; Transliteration: "Ma no Go-nen Ichi-gumi ~Negatibūn to Tohohogisu Yūjō ni Naku!!~" (Japanese: 魔の5年1組 ～ネガティブーンとトホホギス友情に泣く！！～)	Yuka Yamada	March 11, 2016	TBA
111	"Yo-kai Oh Bah Gah!"; Transliteration: "Yōkai Ōbāgā" (Japanese: 妖怪オーバーガー)	Yuka Yamada	March 11, 2016	TBA
112	"Year 3 Class Y, Mr. Nyanpachi: Disrupting Class Academy"; Transliteration: "San-nen Wai-gumi Nyanpachi-sensei Gakkyūhōkai Gakuen" (Japanese: 3年Y組ニャンパチ先生 学級崩壊学園)	Keiichirō Ōchi	March 18, 2016	TBA
112	"Evil Year 5 Class 1: Gishinanki Shatters in Front of the Iron-Clad Women!!"; Transliteration: "Ma no Go-nen Ichi-gumi ~Gishin'anki Teppeki no Onna-tachi no Mae ni Kudakechiru!!~" (Japanese: 魔の5年1組 ～ぎしんあん鬼 鉄壁の女たちの前に砕け散る！！～)	Keiichirō Ōchi	March 18, 2016	TBA
112	"Yo-kai Nautaloss"; Transliteration: "Yōkai Nanmonaito" (Japanese: 妖怪ナンモナイト)	Keiichirō Ōchi	March 18, 2016	TBA
113	"Yo-Kai's Favorite Hit Music Station"; Transliteration: "Yoru no Dorodoro Hitto Sutēshon" (Japanese: 夜のどろどろヒットステーション)	Yōichi Katō	March 25, 2016	December 22, 2018 (A); TBA
113	"Yo-kai Romance of the Three Kingdoms"; Transliteration: "Yōkai Sangokushi" (Japanese: 妖怪三国志)	Yōichi Katō	March 25, 2016	December 22, 2018 (A); TBA
114	"Evil Year 5 Class 1: Ikemenken Howls in Onigiri Hell!!"; Transliteration: "Ma no Go-nen Ichi-gumi ~Ikemenken, Onigiri Jigoku ni Hoeru!!~" (Japanese: 魔の5年1組 ～イケメン犬、おにぎり地獄に吠える！！～)	Natsuko Takahashi	April 1, 2016	TBA
114	"Yo-kai Slippup"; Transliteration: "Yōkai Kuchisuberashi" (Japanese: 妖怪口すべらし)	Natsuko Takahashi	April 1, 2016	TBA
114	"Yo-kai Romance of the Three Kingdoms II"; Transliteration: "Yōkai Sangokushi II" (Japanese: 妖怪三国志II)	Natsuko Takahashi	April 1, 2016	TBA
114	"Yo-kai Snippity Cricket"; Transliteration: "Yōkai Kirisugirisu" (Japanese: 妖怪キリスギリス)	Natsuko Takahashi	April 1, 2016	TBA
115	"Evil Year 5 Class 1: Hanasakajii Withers!!"; Transliteration: "Ma no Go-nen Ichi-gumi ~Hanasakajii Kareru!!~" (Japanese: 魔の5年1組 ～花さか爺 枯れる！！～)	Takamitsu Kōno	April 8, 2016	TBA
115	"Yo-kai Why Naant"; Transliteration: "Yōkai Nandenaan" (Japanese: 妖怪ナンデナン)	Takamitsu Kōno	April 8, 2016	TBA
115	"Yo-kai Romance of the Three Kingdoms III"; Transliteration: "Yōkai Sangokushi III" (Japanese: 妖怪三国志III)	Takamitsu Kōno	April 8, 2016	TBA
115	"Komasan Taxi: Whisper"; Transliteration: "Komasan Takushī ~Wisupā~" (Japanese: コマさんタクシー ～ウィスパー～)	Takamitsu Kōno	April 8, 2016	TBA
116	"Let's Go To Work: Yo-kai Firefighters"; Transliteration: "Oshigoto Shirīzu "Yōkai Shōbōtai"" (Japanese: お仕事シリーズ『妖怪消防隊』)	Yōichi Katō	April 15, 2016	July 30, 2018 (A); TBA
116	"Yo-kai Repossessor"; Transliteration: "Yōkai Okurairi" (Japanese: 妖怪おくらいり)	Yōichi Katō	April 15, 2016	July 30, 2018 (A); TBA
116	"Yo-kai Romance of the Three Kingdoms IV"; Transliteration: "Yōkai Sangokushi IV" (Japanese: 妖怪三国志IV)	Yōichi Katō	April 15, 2016	July 30, 2018 (A); TBA
116	"Kowailight Zone: Terror, The Window That Wouldn't Close"; Transliteration: "Kowairaito Zōne ~Kyōfu Shimarazu no Mado~" (Japanese: こわいライトゾーン ～恐怖 閉まらずの窓～)	Yōichi Katō	April 15, 2016	July 30, 2018 (A); TBA
117	"Evil Year 5 Class 1: Haraodori Distracts the Namaste!!"; Transliteration: "Ma no Go-nen Ichi-gumi ~Haraodori, Namasute ni Chiru!!~" (Japanese: 魔の5年1組 ～はらおドリ ナマステに散る！！～)	Yuka Yamada	April 22, 2016	TBA
117	"Job Series: Yo-kai Hospital"; Transliteration: "Oshigoto Shirīzu "Yōkai Byōin"" (Japanese: お仕事シリーズ『妖怪病院』)	Yuka Yamada	April 22, 2016	TBA
117	"Yo-kai Hot Air Buffoon"; Transliteration: "Yōkai Ibarūn" (Japanese: 妖怪いばるーん)	Yuka Yamada	April 22, 2016	TBA
117	"Yo-kai Romance of the Three Kingdoms V"; Transliteration: "Yōkai Sangokushi V" (Japanese: 妖怪三国志V)	Yuka Yamada	April 22, 2016	TBA
118	"Evil Year 5 Class 1: Yo-kai Final Battle, The Supreme Commander Appears!!"; Transliteration: "Ma no Go-nen Ichi-gumi ~Yōkai Saishū Kessen, Sōdaishō Arawaru!!~" (Japanese: 魔の5年1組 ～妖怪最終決戦 総大将あらわる！！～)	Takamitsu Kōno	April 29, 2016	TBA
118	"Job Series: Yo-kai Stuntman"; Transliteration: "Oshigoto Shirīzu "Yōkai Sutantoman"" (Japanese: お仕事シリーズ『妖怪スタントマン』)	Takamitsu Kōno	April 29, 2016	TBA
118	"Yo-kai Greengramps"; Transliteration: "Yōkai Ekorojii" (Japanese: 妖怪エコロ爺)	Takamitsu Kōno	April 29, 2016	TBA
118	"Yo-kai Romance of the Three Kingdoms VI"; Transliteration: "Yōkai Sangokushi VI" (Japanese: 妖怪三国志VI)	Takamitsu Kōno	April 29, 2016	TBA
119	"Start Your Engines! The Yo-1 Grand Prix!"; Transliteration: "Kaimaku! Yōwan Guranpuri!" (Japanese: 開幕！妖1グランプリ！)	Takamitsu Kōno	May 6, 2016	December 29, 2018
Nate, Hailey Anne and the Yo-kai compete in the Yo-1 Grand Prix for the gold.
120	"Job Series: Yo-kai Flight Attendant"; Transliteration: "Oshigoto Shirīzu "Yōkai Kyakushitsu Jōmuin"" (Japanese: お仕事シリーズ『妖怪客室乗務員』)	Yōichi Katō	May 13, 2016	TBA
120	"The InaUsa Mysterious Detective Agency: Investigation File 1 'Hanahojin'"; Transliteration: "InaUsa Fushigi Tanteisha Chōsa Fairu 1 "Hanahojin"" (Japanese: イナウサ不思議探偵社 調査ファイル1『ハナホ人』)	Yōichi Katō	May 13, 2016	TBA
120	"Yo-kai Romance of the Three Kingdoms VII"; Transliteration: "Yōkai Sangokushi VII" (Japanese: 妖怪三国志VII)	Yōichi Katō	May 13, 2016	TBA
121	"Let's Go To Work!: Yo-kai Daycare"; Transliteration: "Oshigoto Shirīzu "Yōkai Hoikuen"" (Japanese: お仕事シリーズ『妖怪保育園』)	Natsuko Takahashi	May 20, 2016	November 24, 2018 (A); TBA
121	"The InaUsa Mysterious Detective Agency: Investigation File 2 'Bakurobaa'"; Transliteration: "InaUsa Fushigi Tanteisha Chōsa Fairu 2 "Bakurobaa"" (Japanese: イナウサ不思議探偵社 調査ファイル2『バクロ婆』)	Natsuko Takahashi	May 20, 2016	November 24, 2018 (A); TBA
121	"Yo-kai T-Wrecks"; Transliteration: "Yōkai Dainashī" (Japanese: 妖怪ダイナシー)	Natsuko Takahashi	May 20, 2016	November 24, 2018 (A); TBA
121	"Yo-kai Romance of the Three Kingdoms VIII"; Transliteration: "Yōkai Sangokushi VIII" (Japanese: 妖怪三国志VIII)	Natsuko Takahashi	May 20, 2016	November 24, 2018 (A); TBA
122	"The InaUsa Mysterious Detective Agency: Investigation File 3 'Meramelion'"; Transliteration: "InaUsa Fushigi Tanteisha Chōsa Fairu 3 "Merameraion"" (Japanese: イナウサ不思議探偵社 調査ファイル3『メラメライオン』)	Yuka Yamada	June 3, 2016	TBA
122	"Job Series: Yo-kai Aquarium"; Transliteration: "Oshigoto Shirīzu "Yōkai Suizokukan"" (Japanese: お仕事シリーズ『妖怪水族館』)	Yuka Yamada	June 3, 2016	TBA
122	"Yo-kai Oh Wheel"; Transliteration: "Yōkai Maikkā" (Japanese: 妖怪マイッカー)	Yuka Yamada	June 3, 2016	TBA
122	"Yo-kai Romance of the Three Kingdoms IX"; Transliteration: "Yōkai Sangokushi IX" (Japanese: 妖怪三国志IX)	Yuka Yamada	June 3, 2016	TBA
123	"Job Series: Yo-kai Traffic Cop"; Transliteration: "Oshigoto Shirīzu "Yōkai Omawarisan"" (Japanese: お仕事シリーズ『妖怪おまわりさん』)	Keiichirō Ōchi	June 10, 2016	TBA; December 22, 2018 (B); TBA
123	"Hapyon Detective Agency Case No. 7: Happierre"; Transliteration: "InaUsa Fushigi Tanteisha Chōsa Fairu 4 "Honobōno"" (Japanese: イナウサ不思議探偵社 調査ファイル4『ホノボーノ』)	Keiichirō Ōchi	June 10, 2016	TBA; December 22, 2018 (B); TBA
123	"Yo-kai Humptea Jumptea"; Transliteration: "Yōkai Banjī Kyūsu" (Japanese: 妖怪バンジーきゅうす)	Keiichirō Ōchi	June 10, 2016	TBA; December 22, 2018 (B); TBA
123	"Yo-kai Romance of the Three Kingdoms: Finale"; Transliteration: "Yōkai Sangokushi Saishūkai" (Japanese: 妖怪三国志 最終回)	Keiichirō Ōchi	June 10, 2016	TBA; December 22, 2018 (B); TBA
124	"Let's Go To Work!: Yo-kai Diner"; Transliteration: "Oshigoto Shirīzu "Yōkai Famirī Resutoran"" (Japanese: お仕事シリーズ『妖怪ファミリーレストラン』)	Takamitsu Kōno	June 17, 2016	October 27, 2018 (A); TBA
124	"The InaUsa Mysterious Detective Agency: Case File 5: Gurerurin"; Transliteration: "InaUsa Fushigi Tanteisha Chōsa Fairu 5 "Gurerurin"" (Japanese: イナウサ不思議探偵社 調査ファイル5『グレるりん』)	Takamitsu Kōno	June 17, 2016	October 27, 2018 (A); TBA
124	"Yo-kai Horizontail"; Transliteration: "Yōkai Darisu" (Japanese: 妖怪ダリス)	Takamitsu Kōno	June 17, 2016	October 27, 2018 (A); TBA
Komasan and Komajiro work at a family restaurant. Hailey Anne, Usapyon, Peckpocket and Bakuon-narashi learn how Roughraff became a Yo-kai. Nate, several Yo-kai and other become lazy because of the Yo-kai Horizontail.
125	"The InaUsa Mysterious Detective Agency: Case File 6: Fubukihime"; Transliteration: "InaUsa Fushigi Tanteisha Chōsa Fairu 6 "Fubukihime"" (Japanese: イナウサ不思議探偵社 調査ファイル6『ふぶき姫』)	Yōichi Katō	June 24, 2016	TBA
125	"Android Yamada Episode 1: Launch"; Transliteration: "Andoroido Yamada Dai-ichi-Wa Shutsugeki" (Japanese: アンドロイド山田 第一話 出撃)	Yōichi Katō	June 24, 2016	TBA
125	"Yo-kai Nervous Rex"; Transliteration: "Yōkai Fuankan" (Japanese: 妖怪ふあんかん)	Yōichi Katō	June 24, 2016	TBA
126	"Android Yamada Episode 2: Impatience"; Transliteration: "Andoroido Yamada Dai-Ni-Wa Shōsō" (Japanese: アンドロイド山田 第二話 焦燥)	Natsuko Takahashi	July 1, 2016	TBA
126	"The InaUsa Mysterious Detective Agency: Case File 7: Monomannequin"; Transliteration: "InaUsa Fushigi Tanteisha Chōsa Fairu 7 "Monomanekin"" (Japanese: イナウサ不思議探偵社 調査ファイル7『モノマネキン』)	Natsuko Takahashi	July 1, 2016	TBA
126	"Yo-kai Legsit"; Transliteration: "Yōkai Hijōguchi" (Japanese: 妖怪ひじょうぐち)	Natsuko Takahashi	July 1, 2016	TBA
127	"Android Yamada Episode 3: Hammer"; Transliteration: "Andoroido Yamada Dai-San-Wa Tettsui" (Japanese: アンドロイド山田 第三話 鉄槌)	Keiichirō Ōchi	July 8, 2016	TBA; December 15, 2018 (C)
127	"The InaUsa Mysterious Detective Agency: Case File 8: Netaballerina"; Transliteration: "InaUsa Fushigi Tanteisha Chōsa Fairu 8 "Netabarerīna"" (Japanese: イナウサ不思議探偵社 調査ファイル8『ネタバレリーナ』)	Keiichirō Ōchi	July 8, 2016	TBA; December 15, 2018 (C)
127	"Yo-kai Injurnalist"; Transliteration: "Yōkai Aitatataimuzu" (Japanese: 妖怪アイタタタイムズ)	Keiichirō Ōchi	July 8, 2016	TBA; December 15, 2018 (C)
SP3	"Super-Deluxe Edition Yo-kai Watch: A Summer Treasure Trove of New Information Special, Nyan!"; Transliteration: "Chōgōkaban Yōkai Wotchi Natsu no Otakara Jōhō Daihōshutsu Supesharu da Nyan!" (Japanese: 超豪華版妖怪ウォッチ 夏のお宝情報大放出 スペシャルだニャン！)	TBA	July 15, 2016	TBA
A ninety-minute special featuring the back-to-back broadcasts of episodes 128 and 129, with sneak peeks at the third Yo-kai Watch movie, to celebrate the release of the Yo-kai Watch 3 video games.
128	"Android Yamada Episode 4: Isolated"; Transliteration: "Andoroido Yamada Dai-Yon-Wa Koritsu" (Japanese: アンドロイド山田 第四話 孤立)	Yuka Yamada	July 15, 2016	TBA
128	"The InaUsa Mysterious Detective Agency: Case File 9: Bōbō"; Transliteration: "InaUsa Fushigi Tanteisha Chōsa Fairu 9 "Bōbō"" (Japanese: イナウサ不思議探偵社 調査ファイル9『ボー坊』)	Yuka Yamada	July 15, 2016	TBA
128	"Yo-kai Demandi"; Transliteration: "Yōkai Muchaburikko" (Japanese: 妖怪無茶ぶりっ子)	Yuka Yamada	July 15, 2016	TBA
129	"Android Yamada Episode 5: Conflict"; Transliteration: "Andoroido Yamada Dai-Go-Wa Kattō" (Japanese: アンドロイド山田 第五話 葛藤)	Takamitsu Kōno	July 15, 2016	TBA
129	"The InaUsa Mysterious Detective Agency: Case File 10: Murikabe"; Transliteration: "InaUsa Fushigi Tanteisha Chōsa Fairu 10 "Murikabe"" (Japanese: イナウサ不思議探偵社 調査ファイル10『ムリカベ』)	Takamitsu Kōno	July 15, 2016	TBA
129	"Yo-kai Zest-a-Minute"; Transliteration: "Yōkai Demonēdo" (Japanese: 妖怪デモネード)	Takamitsu Kōno	July 15, 2016	TBA
130	"Tomnyan Appears! Let's Get the Yo-kai Watch Dream!"; Transliteration: "Tomunyan Tōjō! Yōkai Wotchi Dorīmu o Getto seyo!" (Japanese: トムニャン登場！妖怪ウォッチドリームをゲットせよ！)	Yōichi Katō	July 22, 2016	TBA
131	"Android Yamada Episode 6: Regret"; Transliteration: "Andoroido Yamada Dai-Roku-Wa Munen" (Japanese: アンドロイド山田 第六話 無念)	Keiichirō Ōchi	July 29, 2016	TBA
131	"Tomnyan and Jerry"; Transliteration: "Tomunyan to Jerī" (Japanese: トムニャンとジェリー)	Keiichirō Ōchi	July 29, 2016	TBA
131	"Yo-kai Nazotoki"; Transliteration: "Yōkai Nazotoki" (Japanese: 妖怪なぞトキ)	Keiichirō Ōchi	July 29, 2016	TBA
132	"Android Yamada Episode 7: Melancholy"; Transliteration: "Andoroido Yamada Saishū-Wa Aishū" (Japanese: アンドロイド山田 最終話 哀愁)	Yuka Yamada	August 5, 2016	TBA
132	"Inaho Observation Diary"; Transliteration: "Inaho Kansatsu Nikki" (Japanese: イナホ観察日記)	Yuka Yamada	August 5, 2016	TBA
132	"Yo-kai Nikuyaki"; Transliteration: "Yōkai Nikuyaki" (Japanese: 妖怪ニクヤ鬼)	Yuka Yamada	August 5, 2016	TBA
133	"Komarly Hills High School Episode 1: Party"; Transliteration: "Komarī Hiruzu Seishun Hakusho Dai-ichi wa Pātī" (Japanese: コマリーヒルズ青春白書 第1話 パーティー)	Natsuko Takahashi	August 12, 2016	TBA
133	"Hayley's Personal Belongings"; Transliteration: "Inaho no Kangaerū Hito Pāto 1" (Japanese: イナホのカンガエルーひと パート1)	Natsuko Takahashi	August 12, 2016	TBA
133	"Unchikuma and Bakazukin"; Transliteration: "Unchikuma to Bakazukin" (Japanese: うんちく魔とばか頭巾)	Natsuko Takahashi	August 12, 2016	TBA
134	"Komarly Hills High School Episode 2: Sports"; Transliteration: "Komarī Hiruzu Seishun Hakusho Dai-ni wa Supōtsu" (Japanese: コマリーヒルズ青春白書 第2話 スポーツ)	Takamitsu Kōno	August 19, 2016	TBA
134	"Hayley's Personal Ponderings: Part 2"; Transliteration: "Inaho no Kangaerū Hito Pāto 2" (Japanese: イナホのカンガエルーひと パート2)	Takamitsu Kōno	August 19, 2016	TBA
134	"Usapyon Ran Away From Home"; Transliteration: "Usapyon No Iede" (Japanese: USAピョンの家出)	Takamitsu Kōno	August 19, 2016	TBA
134	"Yo-kai Twirly pie" Transliteration: "Yōkai Piyopiyoko" (Japanese: 妖怪ピヨピヨコ)	Takamitsu Kōno	August 19, 2016	TBA
135	"Komarly Hills High School Episode 3: Cruising"; Transliteration: "Komarī Hiruzu Seishun Hakusho Dai-san wa Kurūjingu" (Japanese: コマリーヒルズ青春白書 第3話 クルージング)	Keiichirō Ōchi	August 26, 2016	TBA
135	"The Hero Show is Also Full of Yo-kai!"; Transliteration: "Hīrō Shō Ni Mo Yōkai Ga Ippai" (Japanese: ヒーローショーにも妖怪がいっぱい)	Keiichirō Ōchi	August 26, 2016	TBA
135	"Yo-kai Takorami"; Transliteration: "Yōkai Takourami" (Japanese: 妖怪たこうらみ)	Keiichirō Ōchi	August 26, 2016	TBA
136	"Komarly Hills High School Episode 4: Pajama Party"; Transliteration: "Komarī Hiruzu Seishun Hakusho Dai-yon wa Pajama Pātī" (Japanese: コマリーヒルズ青春白書 第4話 パジャマパーティー)	Yuka Yamada	September 2, 2016	TBA
136	"Tomnyan vs. Floury Japan" (Japanese: トムニャンVS粉ものジャポン)	Yuka Yamada	September 2, 2016	TBA
136	"Yo-kai Kameppa"; Transliteration: "Yōkai Kameppa" (Japanese: 妖怪カメッパ)	Yuka Yamada	September 2, 2016	TBA
137	"Komarly Hills High School Episode 5: Shopping"; Transliteration: "Komarī Hiruzu Seishun Hakusho Dai-go wa Shoppingu" (Japanese: コマリーヒルズ青春白書 第5話 ショッピング)	Yōichi Katō	September 9, 2016	TBA
137	"Yo-kai Kamaitachi"; Transliteration: "Yōkai Kamaitachi" (Japanese: 妖怪かまいたち)	Yōichi Katō	September 9, 2016	TBA
137	"The Scorching White Hot Game"; Transliteration: "Shakunetsu no Atchitchi Geimu" (Japanese: 灼熱のアッチッチゲーム)	Yōichi Katō	September 9, 2016	TBA
138	"Yo-kai Akkerakan"; Transliteration: "Yōkai Akkera Kan" (Japanese: 妖怪あっけら艦)	Takamitsu Kōno	September 16, 2016	TBA
138	"Yo-kai Gachin-kozo"; Transliteration: "Yōkai Gachinkozō" (Japanese: 妖怪 ガチン小僧)	Takamitsu Kōno	September 16, 2016	TBA
138	"Komarly Hills High School Episode 6: Drive"; Transliteration: "Komarī Hiruzu Seishun Hakusho Dai-roku wa Doraibu" (Japanese: コマリーヒルズ青春白書 第6話 ドライブ)	Takamitsu Kōno	September 16, 2016	TBA
139	"Komarly Hills High School Episode 7: Gourmetdate"; Transliteration: "Komarī Hiruzu Seishun Hakusho Dai-nana wa Gurume deito" (Japanese: コマリーヒルズ青春白書 第7話 グルメデート)	Natsuko Takahashi	September 23, 2016	TBA
139	"Inaho's Personal Belongings: Part 3"; Transliteration: "Inaho no Kangaerū Hito Pāto 3" (Japanese: イナホのカンガエルーひと パート3)	Natsuko Takahashi	September 23, 2016	TBA
139	"Yo-kai Ashitagirl"; Transliteration: "Yōkai Ashita Gaaru" (Japanese: 妖怪 あしたガール)	Natsuko Takahashi	September 23, 2016	TBA
140	"Komarly Hills High School Final Episode: Graduation"; Transliteration: "Komarī Hiruzu Seishun Hakusho Saishū wa Sotsugyō" (Japanese: コマリーヒルズ青春白書 最終話 卒業)	Yōichi Katō	September 30, 2016	TBA
140	"Photo Evidence! Mystery Magazine Nu: Fish-Man"; Transliteration: "Gekisha! Fushigi Magajin "Nū" Gyojin Hen" (Japanese: 激写!不思議マガジン『ヌー』魚人編)	Yōichi Katō	September 30, 2016	TBA
140	"Yo-kai Krystal fox" Transliteration: "Yōkai Kon-tan" (Japanese: 妖怪 コンたん)	Yōichi Katō	September 30, 2016	TBA
141	"Photo Evidence! Mystery Magazine Nu: Dinosauroid"; Transliteration: "Gekisha! Fushigi Magajin "Nū" Dinosauroido Hen" (Japanese: 激写!不思議マガジン『ヌー』ディノサウロイド編)	Keiichirō Ōchi	October 7, 2016	TBA
141	"Yo-kai Oreryu"; Transliteration: "Yōkai Oreryū" (Japanese: 妖怪 おれリュウ)	Keiichirō Ōchi	October 7, 2016	TBA
141	"Yo-kai Amanjiru"; Transliteration: "Yōkai Amanjiru" (Japanese: 妖怪 あまん汁)	Keiichirō Ōchi	October 7, 2016	TBA
142	"Yo-kai Kanpe-chan"; Transliteration: "Yōkai Kanpe-chan" (Japanese: 妖怪カンペちゃん)	Yuka Yamada	October 14, 2016	TBA
142	"Photo Evidence! Mystery Magazine Nu: Jersey Devil"; Transliteration: "Gekisha! Fushigi Magajin "Nū" Jājī Debiru Hen" (Japanese: 激写！不思議マガジン「ヌー」ジャージーデビル編)	Yuka Yamada	October 14, 2016	TBA
142	"Yo-kai Tenparunba"; Transliteration: "Yōkai Tenparunba" (Japanese: 妖怪テンパるンバ)	Yuka Yamada	October 14, 2016	TBA
143	"Let's Try Out the Yo-kai Blaster!"; Transliteration: "Otameshi! Yo-kai Burasutā!" (Japanese: お試し！ 妖怪ブラスター！)	Yōichi Katō	October 21, 2016	TBA
143	"Tomnyan's Japan Tour"; Transliteration: "Tomunyan no Japon Tanhō Kendama" (Japanese: トムニャンのジャポン探訪「けん玉」)	Yōichi Katō	October 21, 2016	TBA
143	"Yo-kai Soname"; Transliteration: "Yōkai Sōname" (Japanese: 妖怪総ナメ)	Yōichi Katō	October 21, 2016	TBA
143	"Komasan Taxi:Soname"; Transliteration: "Koma-san Takushī – Sōname –" (Japanese: コマさんタクシー ～総ナメ～)	Yōichi Katō	October 21, 2016	TBA
144	""Photo Evidence! Mystery Magazine Nu: Goatman""; Transliteration: "Gekisha! Fushigi Magajin "Nū" Gōto Man Hen" (Japanese: 激写！不思議マガジン「ヌー」ゴートマン編)	Takamitsu Kōno	October 28, 2016	TBA
144	""An Endangered Species?! Save the Yo-kai Flumpy!""; Transliteration: "Zetsumetsu Sonzen!? Yōkai Bukakkou o Sukue!" (Japanese: 絶滅寸前!? 妖怪ブカッコウを救え！)	Takamitsu Kōno	October 28, 2016	TBA
144	"Yo-kai Hipparidako"; Transliteration: "Yōkai Hippari-dako" (Japanese: 妖怪ひっぱりダコ)	Takamitsu Kōno	October 28, 2016	TBA
145	"Yo-kai Chummer"; Transliteration: "Yōkai Michikusame" (Japanese: 妖怪ミチクサメ)	Yuka Yamada	November 4, 2016	TBA
145	"Photo Evidence! Mystery Magazine Nu: Mothman"; Transliteration: "Gekisha! Fushigi Magajin "Nū" Mosuman Hen" (Japanese: 激写！不思議マガジン「ヌー」モスマン編)	Yuka Yamada	November 4, 2016	TBA
145	"Yo-kai Wakarunner"; Transliteration: "Yōkai waka Ran'nā" (Japanese: 妖怪わかランナー)	Yuka Yamada	November 4, 2016	TBA
146	"Photo Evidence! Mystery Magazine Nu: USApyonder"; Transliteration: "Gekisha! Fushigi Magajin "Nū" Usapyonāda Hen" (Japanese: 激写！不思議マガジン「ヌー」ウサピョナーダ編)	Keiichirō Ōchi	November 11, 2016	TBA
146	"Yo-kai Ben Tover"; Transliteration: "Yōkai Norarikurari" (Japanese: 妖怪のらりくらり)	Keiichirō Ōchi	November 11, 2016	TBA
146	"Yo-kai Flippit"; Transliteration: "Yōkai Makuragaeshi" (Japanese: 妖怪枕返し)	Keiichirō Ōchi	November 11, 2016	TBA
147	"Yo-kai Nyaaminator"; Transliteration: "Yōkai Nyāmineitā" (Japanese: 妖怪ニャーミネーター)	Yōichi Katō	November 18, 2016	TBA
147	"How to Win at Daruma Falls Down?!"; Transliteration: "Daruma-san ga Koronda Kōryaku Hō!?" (Japanese: だるまさんがころんだ攻略法!?)	Yōichi Katō	November 18, 2016	TBA
147	"Tomnyan's Japan Tour Part 2"; Transliteration: "Tomunyan no Japon Tanhō Omochi" (Japanese: トムニャンのジャポン探訪「おもち」)	Yōichi Katō	November 18, 2016	TBA
147	"Yo-kai Grumpus Khan"; Transliteration: "Yōkai Jingisukan" (Japanese: 妖怪ジンギスギスカン)	Yōichi Katō	November 18, 2016	TBA
147	"Yo=kai Nyaaminator Part 2"; Transliteration: "Yōkai Nyāmineitā Pāto 2" (Japanese: 妖怪ニャーミネーター Part2)	Yōichi Katō	November 18, 2016	TBA
147	"Whisper Runs Away"; Transliteration: "Wisupā no Iede" (Japanese: ウィスパーの家出)	Yōichi Katō	November 18, 2016	TBA
148	"Pursuing a Suspicious Hailey!"; Transliteration: "Ayashii Inaho o Oikakero!" (Japanese: あやしいイナホを追いかけろ！)	Natsuko Takahashi	November 25, 2016	TBA
148	"Yo-kai Harmory"; Transliteration: "Yōkai Hāmorī" (Japanese: 妖怪ハーモリー)	Natsuko Takahashi	November 25, 2016	TBA
148	"Yo-kai Hottocake"; Transliteration: "Yōkai Hottokeiki" (Japanese: 妖怪ほっとけーキ)	Natsuko Takahashi	November 25, 2016	TBA
149	"Nate vs. Hailey: Duel Over the One-Time Lottery!"; Transliteration: "Keita vs Inaho Ippatsu kuji no Kettou!" (Japanese: ケータVSイナホ 一発クジの決闘！)	Takamitsu Kōno	December 9, 2016	TBA
149	"Tomnyan's Japan Tour: Part 3"; Transliteration: "Tomunyan no Japon Tanhō Koma" (Japanese: トムニャンのジャポン探訪「コマ」)	Takamitsu Kōno	December 9, 2016	TBA
149	"Yo-kai Chikurima"; Transliteration: "Yōkai Chikurima" (Japanese: 妖怪チクリ魔)	Takamitsu Kōno	December 9, 2016	TBA
149	"Yo-kai Soramimizuku"; Transliteration: "Yōkai Sora mimizuku" (Japanese: 妖怪そらミミズク)	Takamitsu Kōno	December 9, 2016	TBA
SP4	Transliteration: "Eiga Dainidan Chijōha Hatsuhōsō! Nijikanhan Supesharu Zura!" (Japanese: 映画第2弾地上波初放送！2時間半スペシャルズラ！)	TBA	December 16, 2016	TBA
150	"Jibanyan and the Five Presents, Nyan!"; Transliteration: "Jibanyan to Itsutsu no Purezento da Nyan!" (Japanese: ジバニャンと5つのプレゼントだニャン！)	Yōichi Katō	December 23, 2016	TBA
150	"The Questions About Yo-kai Everyone Wants to Know! We're Answerin' Them, Y'all!"; Transliteration: "Minna ga Shiritai Youkai no Gimon! Oratachi ga Kaiketsu Zura! Supesharu" (Japanese: みんなが知りたい妖怪の疑問！オラたちが解決ズラ！スペシャル)	Yōichi Katō	December 23, 2016	TBA

=== Season 3 (2017–18) ===
No.	Title	Written by	Original air date	English air date
151	"Tomnyan's Japon Exploration: First Year"; Transliteration: "Tomunyan Hajimete no Oshōgatsu" (Japanese: トムニャン はじめてのお正月)	Yuka Yamada	January 6, 2017	TBA
151	"Yo-kai Decidevible"; Transliteration: "Yōkai Kimete Maō" (Japanese: 妖怪決めて魔王)	Yuka Yamada	January 6, 2017	TBA
151	"Blizzaria and Komasan"; Transliteration: "Fubukihime to Komasan" (Japanese: ふぶき姫とコマさん)	Yuka Yamada	January 6, 2017	TBA
152	"Komasan and Komajiro's Japanese Whole Country Journey: In Osaka"; Transliteration: "Koma-san koma Jirō no nipponzenkoku mongei tabi in Ōsaka" (Japanese: コマさんコマじろうの日本全国もんげー旅 IN大阪)	Yōichi Katō	January 6, 2017	TBA
152	"Inausa Yo-kai Mystery File 1: Find the Crashed UFO"; Transliteration: "Inausa yōkai misuterī fairu 1 yūfō hen" (Japanese: イナウサ妖怪ミステリーファイル1 UFO編を探せ!)	Yōichi Katō	January 6, 2017	TBA
152	"Trial! Yo-kai Bazooka!"; Transliteration: "Otameshi! Yōkai bazūka!" (Japanese: お試し！ 妖怪バズーカ！)	Yōichi Katō	January 6, 2017	TBA
153	"Komasan and Komajiro's Japanese Whole Country Journey: In Nagoya"; Transliteration: "Koma-san koma Jirō no nipponzenkoku mongei tabi in Nagoya" (Japanese: コマさんコマじろうの日本全国もんげー旅 IN名古屋)	Keiichirō Ōchi	January 13, 2017	TBA
153	"Momonyan's Heavy Metal Oni Extermination!"; Transliteration: "Momotaronyan no Gōtetsu oni taiji!" (Japanese: モモタロニャンの豪鉄鬼退治！)	Keiichirō Ōchi	January 13, 2017	TBA
153	"Fierce Fight! Not Getting Out of Bed Championships!"; Transliteration: "Gekitō! Futon Kara Denai Senshūken!" (Japanese: 激闘！布団から出ない選手権！)	Keiichirō Ōchi	January 13, 2017	TBA
154	"Komasan and Komajiro's Japanese Whole Country Journey: In Hokkaido"; Transliteration: "Koma-san koma Jirō no nipponzenkoku mongei tabi in Hokkaido" (Japanese: コマさんコマじろうの日本全国もんげー旅 IN北海道)	Natsuko Takahashi	January 20, 2017	TBA
154	"Yo-kai Pochit/Push Pup"; Transliteration: "Yōkai Pochi" (Japanese: 妖怪ポチッ)	Natsuko Takahashi	January 20, 2017	TBA
154	"Inausa Yo-kai Mystery File 2: Solve the Crop Circle Mystery!"; Transliteration: "Inausa yōkai misuterī fairu 2 Misuterī Sākuru Hen" (Japanese: イナウサ妖怪ミステリーファイル2 ミステリーサークルの謎を解け!)	Natsuko Takahashi	January 20, 2017	TBA
155	"Komasan and Komajiro's Japanese Whole Country Journey: In Shizuoka"; Transliteration: "Koma-san koma Jirō no nipponzenkoku mongei tabi in Shizuoka" (Japanese: コマさんコマじろうの日本全国もんげー旅 IN静岡)	Takamitsu Kōno	January 27, 2017	TBA
155	"Tomnyan's Japon Exploration: First Setsubun"; Transliteration: "Tomunyan no Japon Tanhō Hajimete no Setsubun" (Japanese: トムニャンのジャポン探訪「はじめての節分」)	Takamitsu Kōno	January 27, 2017	TBA
155	"Yo-kai Love-Torn"; Transliteration: "Yōkai Yaburetā" (Japanese: 妖怪やぶレター)	Takamitsu Kōno	January 27, 2017	TBA
156	"Kuroi Yo-kai Watch ~Guided Scum~ First Person: "Nate""; Transliteration: "Kuroi Yōkai Wotchi Michibikareshi kuzu-tachi Hitorime Keita" (Japanese: 黒い妖怪ウォッチ ～導かれしクズたち～ 一人目『ケータ』)	Yōichi Katō	February 3, 2017	TBA
156	"Komasan and Komajiro's Japanese Whole Country Journey: In Kagawa"; Transliteration: "Koma-san koma Jirō no nipponzenkoku mongei tabi in Kagawa" (Japanese: コマさんコマじろうの日本全国もんげー旅 IN香川)	Yōichi Katō	February 3, 2017	TBA
156	"Yo-kai Princess Speech/Gabby"; Transliteration: "Yōkai Supīchi Hime" (Japanese: 妖怪スピーチ姫)	Yōichi Katō	February 3, 2017	TBA
157	"Komasan and Komajiro's Japanese Whole Country Journey: In Nara"; Transliteration: "Koma-san koma Jirō no nipponzenkoku mongei tabi in Nara" (Japanese: コマさんコマじろうの日本全国もんげー旅 IN奈良)	Yuka Yamada	February 10, 2017	TBA
157	"Inausa Yo-kai Mystery File 3: Solve the Mystery of the Poltergeist!"; Transliteration: "Inausa yōkai misuterī fairu 3 PorutāGaisuto Hen" (Japanese: イナウサ妖怪ミステリーファイル3 ポルターガイスト謎を解け!)	Yuka Yamada	February 10, 2017	TBA
157	"Valentine ♡ Doki Doki Chocolate Party"; Transliteration: "Barentain Dokidoki Choko Pātī" (Japanese: バレンタイン♡ドキドキチョコパーティー)	Yuka Yamada	February 10, 2017	TBA
158	"Kuroi Yo-kai Watch ~Guided Scum~ Second Person "Bear""; Transliteration: "Kuroi Yōkai Wotchi Michibikareshi kuzu-tachi Futarime Kuma" (Japanese: 黒い妖怪ウォッチ ～導かれしクズたち～ 二人目『クマ』)	Keiichirō Ōchi	February 17, 2017	TBA
158	"Komasan & Komajiro's Japanese Whole Country Journey: In Okinawa"; Transliteration: "Koma-san koma Jirō no nipponzenkoku mongei tabi in Okinawa" (Japanese: コマさんコマじろうの日本全国もんげー旅 IN沖縄)	Keiichirō Ōchi	February 17, 2017	TBA
158	"Inausa Yo-kai Mystery File 4: Find the Doppelganger!"; Transliteration: "Inausa yōkai misuterī fairu 4 Dopperugengā Hen" (Japanese: イナウサ妖怪ミステリーファイル4 もう一人の自分ドッペルゲンガーを探せ!)	Keiichirō Ōchi	February 17, 2017	TBA
158	"Yo-kai Achar/Sigh-Durr"; Transliteration: "Yōkai Achā" (Japanese: 妖怪アチャー)	Keiichirō Ōchi	February 17, 2017	TBA
159	"Kuroi Yo-kai Watch ~Guided Scum~ Third Person "Eddie""; Transliteration: "Kuroi Yōkai Wotchi Michibikareshi kuzu-tachi San'ninme Kanchi" (Japanese: 黒い妖怪ウォッチ ～導かれしクズたち～ 三人目『カンチ』)	Takamitsu Kōno	February 24, 2017	TBA
159	"Komasan and Komajiro's Japanese Whole Country Journey: In Iwate"; Transliteration: "Koma-san koma Jirō no nipponzenkoku mongei tabi in Iwate" (Japanese: コマさんコマじろうの日本全国もんげー旅 IN岩手)	Takamitsu Kōno	February 24, 2017	TBA
159	"Hinamatsuri Big Battle! Blizzaria vs Princess Tsubaki/Camellia"; Transliteration: "Hinamatsuri Daibatoru! Fubukihime vs Tsubakihime" (Japanese: ひなまつり大バトル！ ふぶき姫VS椿姫)	Takamitsu Kōno	February 24, 2017	TBA
160	"Kuroi Yo-kai Watch ~Guided Scum! Fourth Person "Katie""; Transliteration: "Kuroi Yōkai Wotchi Michibikareshi kuzu-tachi 4-ninme Fumi-chan" (Japanese: 黒い妖怪ウォッチ ～導かれしクズたち～ 四人目『フミちゃん』)	Natsuko Takahashi	March 3, 2017	TBA
160	"Komasan and Komajiro's Japanese Whole Country Tour: In Fukuoka"; Transliteration: "Koma-san koma Jirō no nipponzenkoku mongei tabi in Fukuoka" (Japanese: コマさんコマじろうの日本全国もんげー旅 IN福岡)	Natsuko Takahashi	March 3, 2017	TBA
160	"Yo-kai Jimanhattan/City-Licker"; Transliteration: "Yōkai Jiman Hattan" (Japanese: 妖怪自慢ハッタン)	Natsuko Takahashi	March 3, 2017	TBA
161	"Kuroi Yo-kai Watch ~Guided Scum~ Fifth Person: "UZAPyon""; Transliteration: "Kuroi Yōkai Wotchi Michibikareshi kuzu-tachi Goninme Uzapyon" (Japanese: 黒い妖怪ウォッチ ～導かれしクズたち～ 五人目『UZAピョン』)	Yōichi Katō	March 10, 2017	TBA
161	"Inausa Yo-kai Mystery File 5: Chase the Fafrotskies Mystery!"; Transliteration: "Inausa yōkai misuterī fairu 5 Fafurotsukīzu" (Japanese: イナウサ妖怪ミステリーファイル5 ファフロツキーズ の謎を追え!)	Yōichi Katō	March 10, 2017	TBA
161	"Yo-kai Gojidatsujii/Misterr Typoo"; Transliteration: "Yōkai Gojidatsujii" (Japanese: 妖怪ゴジダツ爺)	Yōichi Katō	March 10, 2017	TBA
161	"Komasan Taxi ~ Snottle ~"; Transliteration: "Komasan Takushii Hanahojin" (Japanese: コマさんタクシー ～ハナホ人～)	Yōichi Katō	March 10, 2017	TBA
162	"Kuroi Yo-kai Watch ~Guided Scum~ Sixth Person: "Venoct""; Transliteration: "Kuroi Yōkai Wotchi Michibikareshi kuzu-tachi 6 ninme Orochi" (Japanese: 黒い妖怪ウォッチ ～導かれしクズたち～ 六人目『オロチ』)	Yuka Yamada	March 17, 2017	TBA
162	"Komasan and Komajiro's Japanese Whole Country Journey: In Hiroshima"; Transliteration: "Koma-san koma Jirō no nipponzenkoku mongei tabi in Hiroshima" (Japanese: コマさんコマじろうの日本全国もんげー旅 IN広島)	Yuka Yamada	March 17, 2017	TBA
162	"Whisper's Graduation"; Transliteration: "Wisupā no Sotsugyō" (Japanese: ウィスパーの卒業)	Yuka Yamada	March 17, 2017	TBA
163	"Kuroi Yo-kai Watch ~Guided Scum~ Seventh Person: "Shogunyan""; Transliteration: "Kuroi Yōkai Wotchi Michibikareshi kuzu-tachi 7 ninme Bushinyan" (Japanese: 黒い妖怪ウォッチ ～導かれしクズたち～ 七人目『ブシニャン』)	Keiichirō Ōchi	March 24, 2017	TBA
163	"Inausa Yo-kai Mystery File 6: Girl Hero Hailey"; Transliteration: "Inausa yōkai misuterī fairu 6 Nazo no Shoujo Inaho Hen" (Japanese: イナウサ妖怪ミステリーファイル6 謎の少女 未空イナホ未空イナホを調査せよ!)	Keiichirō Ōchi	March 24, 2017	TBA
163	"Yo-kai Okiraccoon/Slackoon"; Transliteration: "Yōkai Okirakūn" (Japanese: 妖怪おきラクーン)	Keiichirō Ōchi	March 24, 2017	TBA
164	"Yo-kai Watch Busters!"; Transliteration: "Yōkai Wotchi Basutāzu!" (Japanese: 妖怪ウォッチバスターズ！)	Yōichi Katō	March 31, 2017	TBA
164	"The Questions About Yo-kai Everyone Wants to Know! We're Answerin Them Y'all:Part 2"; Transliteration: "Minna ga shiritai Youkai no Gimon! Ora tachi ga Kaiketsu Zura! Supesharu Pāto 2" (Japanese: みんなが知りたい妖怪の疑問！オラたちが解決ズラ！スペシャル パート2)	Yōichi Katō	March 31, 2017	TBA
165	"New Semester! Returning Mr. Crabbycat vs GTA!"; Transliteration: "Shingakki! Kaette kita Nyanpachi sensei vs GTA!" (Japanese: 新学期！ 帰ってきたニャンパチ先生 vs GTA！)	Yōichi Katō	April 7, 2017	TBA
165	"Let's Think about Stories with Everyone! New Yo-kai Series Conference"; Transliteration: "Minna de Ohanashi wo kangaeyou! Youkai Shin Shirīzu Kaigi" (Japanese: みんなでお話を考えよう！ 妖怪新シリーズ会議)	Yōichi Katō	April 7, 2017	TBA
165	"Komasan and a First Year"; Transliteration: "Koma-san to ichi nensei" (Japanese: コマさんと1年生)	Yōichi Katō	April 7, 2017	TBA
166	"All of the Oni Stars' Set! ~Exploration Corps~"; Transliteration: "Onisutāzu Zenin Shūgō! Tankentai Hen" (Japanese: オニスターズ全員集合！ ～探検隊編～)	Natsuko Takahashi	April 14, 2017	TBA
166	"Yo-kai Damajor/Goofball"; Transliteration: "Yōkai Damejā" (Japanese: 妖怪ダメジャー)	Natsuko Takahashi	April 14, 2017	TBA
166	"Hailey's Women Association"; Transliteration: "Inaho no Joshikai" (Japanese: イナホの女子会)	Natsuko Takahashi	April 14, 2017	TBA
167	"Yo-kai New Series Conference ~Mission Nyan-possible~"; Transliteration: "Youkai Shin Shirīzu Kaigi Misshon nya Posshiburu" (Japanese: 妖怪新シリーズ会議 ～ミッションニャンポッシブル～)	Yuka Yamada	April 21, 2017	TBA
167	"Yo-kai Snidewinder"; Transliteration: "Yōkai Ādakonda" (Japanese: 妖怪アーダコンダ)	Yuka Yamada	April 21, 2017	TBA
167	"Exclusive Coverage! World Yo-kai Athletics"; Transliteration: "Dokusen chūkei! Sekai yōkai rikujō" (Japanese: 独占中継！世界妖怪陸上)	Yuka Yamada	April 21, 2017	TBA
168	"Komasan and Komajiro's Japanese Whole Country Journey: In Hawaii"; Transliteration: "Koma-san koma Jirō no nipponzenkoku mongei tabi in Hawai" (Japanese: コマさんコマじろうのゴールデンウィークもんげー旅 INハワイ)	Takamitsu Kōno	April 28, 2017	TBA
168	"Hailey's Spring Break is Full of Yo-kai"; Transliteration: "Inaho no GW wa Youkai ga Ippai" (Japanese: イナホのGWは妖怪がいっぱい)	Takamitsu Kōno	April 28, 2017	TBA
168	"Yo-kai Kaeri Tie/Tie-Red"; Transliteration: "Yōkai Kaeritai" (Japanese: 妖怪かえりタイ)	Takamitsu Kōno	April 28, 2017	TBA
169	"All of the Oni Stars' Set! ~Prisoners~"; Transliteration: "Onisutāzu Zenin Shūgō! Shūjin-hen" (Japanese: オニスターズ全員集合！ ～囚人編～)	Yōichi Katō	May 5, 2017	TBA
169	"Yo-kai New Series Conference ~Witchcat☆Maginyan~"; Transliteration: "Youkai Shin Shirīzu Kaigi Majokko Nyan Majo" (Japanese: 妖怪新シリーズ会議 ～魔女っ子☆ニャン魔女～)	Yōichi Katō	May 5, 2017	TBA
169	"Children's Day is Full of Yo-kai too" Transliteration: "Kodomo no Hi mo Youkai ga ippai" (Japanese: こどもの日も妖怪がいっぱい)	Yōichi Katō	May 5, 2017	TBA
170	"All of the Oni Stars' Set! ~Family Version~"; Transliteration: "Onisutāzu Zenin Shūgō! Kazoku Hen" (Japanese: オニスターズ全員集合！ ～家族編～)	Takamitsu Kōno	May 12, 2017	TBA
170	"Yo-kai New Series Conference ~Mr. Crabbycat Division~"; Transliteration: "Youkai Shin Shirīzu Kaigi Nyanpachi Sensei Bukatsu Hen" (Japanese: 妖怪新シリーズ会議 ～ニャンパチ先生 部活編～)	Takamitsu Kōno	May 12, 2017	TBA
170	"Yo-kai Kechirashi/Shedwin"; Transliteration: "Yōkai Kechirashi" (Japanese: 妖怪けちらし)	Takamitsu Kōno	May 12, 2017	TBA
171	"Mr. Crabbycat Returns! ~Robot Research Department~"; Transliteration: "Kaettekita nyanpachi sensei Bukatsu-hen! Robotto kenkyū-bu" (Japanese: 帰ってきたニャンパチ先生 部活編！～ロボット研究部～)	Keiichirō Ōchi	May 19, 2017	TBA
171	"Yo-kai New Series Conference ~There's Something About Koma~"; Transliteration: "Youkai Shin Shirīzu Kaigi komā nikubittake" (Japanese: 妖怪新シリーズ会議 ～コマーに首ったけ～)	Keiichirō Ōchi	May 19, 2017	TBA
171	"Yo-kai Faysoff"; Transliteration: "yōkai nopperabō" (Japanese: 妖怪のっぺら坊)	Keiichirō Ōchi	May 19, 2017	TBA
172	"All of the Oni Stars' Set! ~Ninja Version~"; Transliteration: "Onisutāzu Zenin Shūgō! Ninja Hen" (Japanese: オニスターズ全員集合！ ～忍者編～)	Natsuko Takahashi	May 26, 2017	TBA
172	"Yo-kai Wall Guy/Judgebrick"; Transliteration: "Yōkai Wōru Gai" (Japanese: 妖怪ウォール・ガイ)	Natsuko Takahashi	May 26, 2017	TBA
172	"Yo-kai New Series Conference ~Brave USAPyon's Great Adventure~"; Transliteration: "Youkai Shin Shirīzu Kaigi Yuusha Usapyon No Daibouken" (Japanese: 妖怪新シリーズ会議 ～勇者USAピョンの大冒険～)	Natsuko Takahashi	May 26, 2017	TBA
173	"Mr Crabbycat Returns! ~Sumo Wrestler~"; Transliteration: "Kaettekita nyanpachi sensei Bukatsu-hen! Sumou-bu" (Japanese: 帰ってきたニャンパチ先生 部活編！～相撲部～)	Yuka Yamada	June 2, 2017	TBA
173	"The Rainy Talk Show for the Rainy Season!"; Transliteration: "tsuyu no amenotōku!" (Japanese: 梅雨のアメノトーク！)	Yuka Yamada	June 2, 2017	TBA
173	"Yo-kai Nanskunk/Stinkeye"; Transliteration: "Yōkai nansukanku" (Japanese: 妖怪ナンスカンク)	Yuka Yamada	June 2, 2017	TBA
174	"All of the Oni Stars' Set ~Hospital Version~"; Transliteration: "Onisutāzu Zenin Shūgō! Byoin Hen" (Japanese: オニスターズ全員集合！ ～病院編～)	Yōichi Katō	June 9, 2017	TBA
174	"Yo-kai Morula/Ampifly"; Transliteration: "Yōkai Morura" (Japanese: 妖怪モルラ)	Yōichi Katō	June 9, 2017	TBA
174	"The Last Nyamurai visits Japon!"; Transliteration: "Rasutobushinyan japon ni kenzan!" (Japanese: ラストブシニャン ジャポンに見参！)	Yōichi Katō	June 9, 2017	TBA
175	"Yo-kai New Series Conference ~Whisper's 100th Marriage Proposal~"; Transliteration: "Youkai Shin Shirīzu Kaigi 100 Wisu kaime no Puropōzu" (Japanese: 妖怪新シリーズ会議 ～100うぃす回目のプロポーズ～)	Takamitsu Kōno	June 16, 2017	TBA
175	"Revelation! USAPyon's Secret"; Transliteration: "Abake! Usapyon no Himitsu" (Japanese: 暴け！ USAピョンの秘密)	Takamitsu Kōno	June 16, 2017	TBA
175	"Yo-kai Sutton-kyo/Shrillington"; Transliteration: "Yōkai sutton kyō" (Japanese: 妖怪スットン卿)	Takamitsu Kōno	June 16, 2017	TBA
176	"Mr. Crabbycat Returns! ~Swimming Division~"; Transliteration: "Kaettekita nyanpachi sensei Bukatsu Hen! Suiei Bu" (Japanese: 帰ってきたニャンパチ先生 部活編！ ～水泳部～)	Keiichirō Ōchi	June 23, 2017	TBA
176	"Hailey Becomes a Cupid of Love"; Transliteration: "Inaho Koi no Kyūpitto ni naru" (Japanese: イナホ 恋のキューピットになる)	Keiichirō Ōchi	June 23, 2017	TBA
176	"Yo-kai Gomathree/Percrushionists"; Transliteration: "Yōkai Goma Surī" (Japanese: 妖怪ごまスリー)	Keiichirō Ōchi	June 23, 2017	TBA
177	"All the Oni Stars' Set! ~Construction Site Version~"; Transliteration: "Onisutāzu Zenin Shūgō! Genba Kouji Hen" (Japanese: オニスターズ全員集合！ ～工事現場編～)	Yuka Yamada	June 30, 2017	TBA
177	"Yo-kai Himatsubushi/Time Keeler"; Transliteration: "Yōkai Himatsu-Bushi" (Japanese: 妖怪ひまつ武士)	Yuka Yamada	June 30, 2017	TBA
177	"Yo-kai Life-is-Parfait"; Transliteration: "Youkai Shiranpurin" (Japanese: 妖怪しらんプリン)	Yuka Yamada	June 30, 2017	TBA
177	"Komasan Taxi ~ Jerry ~"; Transliteration: "Komasan Takushī jerī" (Japanese: コマさんタクシー ～ジェリー～)	Yuka Yamada	June 30, 2017	TBA
178	"Mr. Crabbycat Returns! ~Quiz Study Group"; Transliteration: "Kaettekita nyanpachi sensei Bukatsu Hen! Kuizu Kenkyuukai" (Japanese: 帰ってきたニャンパチ先生 部活編！ ～クイズ研究会～)	Takamitsu Kōno	July 7, 2017	TBA
178	"Confrontation! Wish Fufiller Yo-kai Tanzaku!"; Transliteration: "Sōdatsu-sen! Negai ga kanau yōkai tanzaku" (Japanese: 争奪戦！ 願いがかなう妖怪短冊)	Takamitsu Kōno	July 7, 2017	TBA
178	"Yo-kai Tsubuyaki/Treetter"; Transliteration: "Yōkai Tsubuyaki" (Japanese: 妖怪つぶや木)	Takamitsu Kōno	July 7, 2017	TBA
179	"The Great Great Great Adventurers! Busters Treasure!"; Transliteration: "Daidaidaibouken! Basutāzu Torejā!" (Japanese: 大大大冒険！ バスターズトレジャー！)	Yōichi Katō	July 14, 2017	TBA
180	"Busters Treasure Edition #2 Reluctant Keyholes and Delicious Fossils"; Transliteration: "Basutāzutorejā hen No. 2: shibutoi Kagiana to oishī kaseki" (Japanese: バスターズトレジャー編 #2 しぶとい鍵穴とおいしい化石)	Keiichirō Ōchi	July 21, 2017	TBA
180	"I Tried Doing a Yo-Tube View Count Battle"; Transliteration: "You-Chūbu de saisei-sū batoru o shite mita!" (Japanese: 妖チューブで再生数バトルをしてみた！)	Keiichirō Ōchi	July 21, 2017	TBA
180	"Yo-kai D-Stroy"; Transliteration: "Yōkai D-Rekkusu" (Japanese: 妖怪D-レックス)	Keiichirō Ōchi	July 21, 2017	TBA
181	"Busters Treasure Edition #3: The Rope that Connects Lives"; Transliteration: "Basutāzutorejā hen No. 3 Inochi wo Tsunagu Rōpu" (Japanese: バスターズトレジャー編 #3 命をつなぐロープ)	Takamitsu Kōno	July 28, 2017	TBA
181	"Yo-kai Mo-saku/Bumblejack"; Transliteration: "Yōkai Mosaku" (Japanese: 妖怪モ作)	Takamitsu Kōno	July 28, 2017	TBA
181	"The Last Nyamurai's Japon Expedition "Onigiri""; Transliteration: "Rasutobushinyan no japon no arukikata onigiri" (Japanese: ラストブシニャンのジャポンの歩き方 「おにぎり」)	Takamitsu Kōno	July 28, 2017	TBA
182	"Busters Treasure Edition #4: All you can Dig in the Desert!"; Transliteration: "Basutāzutorejā hen No. 4 Sabaku o horihori Horiri-hōdai!" (Japanese: バスターズトレジャー編 #4 砂漠をホリホリ堀り放題！)	Yuka Yamada	August 4, 2017	TBA
182	"Tengu's Fierce Battle"; Transliteration: "tengu-tachi no shiretsunaru tatakai!" (Japanese: 天狗たちの熾烈なる戦い！)	Yuka Yamada	August 4, 2017	TBA
182	"Yo-kai Batan Q/Re-Q-Perate"; Transliteration: "Yōkai Batankyuu" (Japanese: 妖怪ばたんQ)	Yuka Yamada	August 4, 2017	TBA
183	"Busters Treasure Edition #5: Zomboy"; Transliteration: "Basutāzutorejā hen No. 5 Zon bī choppā" (Japanese: バスターズトレジャー編 #5 ゾン・ビー・C（チョッパー）)	Natsuko Takahashi	August 11, 2017	TBA
183	"Yo-kai Bon Odori"; Transliteration: "Yōkai Nobonodori" (Japanese: 妖怪の盆踊り)	Natsuko Takahashi	August 11, 2017	TBA
183	"The Last Nyamurai's Japon Expedition "Soba""; Transliteration: "rasutobushinyan no japon no arukikata soba" (Japanese: ラストブシニャンのジャポンの歩き方 「そば」)	Natsuko Takahashi	August 11, 2017	TBA
184	"Busters Treasure Edition #6: The Overly Big Chain Sword"; Transliteration: "Basutāzutorejā hen No. 6 Deka sugishi chēnsōdo" (Japanese: バスターズトレジャー編 #6 デカすぎしチェーンソード)	Keiichirō Ōchi	August 18, 2017	TBA
184	"Android Yamada's Summer Vacation"; Transliteration: "andoroido Yamada no natsuyasumi" (Japanese: アンドロイド山田の夏休み)	Keiichirō Ōchi	August 18, 2017	TBA
184	"Yo-kai Abura-sumashi/Ooze Zat"; Transliteration: "Yōkai Abura-sumashi" (Japanese: 妖怪油すまし)	Keiichirō Ōchi	August 18, 2017	TBA
185	"Busters Treasure Edition #7: The Weeping Golden Coffin"; Transliteration: "Basutāzutorejā hen No. 7 Susurinaku kogane no hitsugi" (Japanese: バスターズトレジャー編 #7 すすり泣く黄金の棺)	Yōichi Katō	August 25, 2017	TBA
185	"Yo-kai Kurekupatra/Meopatra ~Yo-kai Watch Crystal Treasure~"; Transliteration: "Yōkai kurekurepatora ~ yōkai u~otchikurisutarutorejā ~" (Japanese: 妖怪クレクレパトラ ～妖怪ウォッチクリスタルトレジャー～)	Yōichi Katō	August 25, 2017	TBA
186	"Busters Treasure Edition #8: Nyanses II and the Piano Melody"; Transliteration: "Basutāzutorejā hen No. 8 Neko 2-sei to piano no senritsu" (Japanese: バスターズトレジャー編 #8 ネコ2世とピアノの旋律)	Takamitsu Kōno	September 1, 2017	TBA
186	"Yo-kai Garandu/Urnfulfilled"; Transliteration: "Yōkai garandu" (Japanese: 妖怪ガランドゥ)	Takamitsu Kōno	September 1, 2017	TBA
186	"Venoct vs Venoctbot"; Transliteration: "orochi VS mekaorochi" (Japanese: オロチ VS メカオロチ)	Takamitsu Kōno	September 1, 2017	TBA
186	"The Last Nyamurai's Japon Expedition "Ninja""; Transliteration: "rasutobushinyan no japon no arukikata ninja" (Japanese: ラストブシニャンのジャポンの歩き方 「忍者」)	Takamitsu Kōno	September 1, 2017	TBA
187	"Busters Treasure Edition #9: Zomboy vs Nyanses II!?"; Transliteration: "Basutāzutorejā hen No. 9 Zon bī choppā vs Neko 2-sei" (Japanese: バスターズトレジャー編 #9 ゾン・ビー・C（チョッパー） VS ネコ2世!?)	Yuka Yamada	September 8, 2017	TBA
187	"Yo-kai Gorgeous Ambassador"; Transliteration: "Yōkai Gōjasu taishi" (Japanese: 妖怪ゴージャス大使)	Yuka Yamada	September 8, 2017	TBA
187	"Damona's Incognito☆Pandemonium"; Transliteration: "hyakki hime no oshinobi ☆ hyakkiyakō" (Japanese: 百鬼姫のお忍び☆百鬼夜行)	Yuka Yamada	September 8, 2017	TBA
188	"All Together Oni Stars! ~Snowy Mountain Version~"; Transliteration: "Kaettekita Onisutāzu zeninshūgō! Yukiyama Hen" (Japanese: 帰ってきたオニスターズ全員集合！ ～雪山編～)	Natsuko Takahashi	September 15, 2017	TBA
188	"Yo-kai Kibandoll/Grubbles"; Transliteration: "Yōkai Kibandōru" (Japanese: 妖怪黄ばんドール)	Natsuko Takahashi	September 15, 2017	TBA
188	"A Terrifying Parent-Teacher Conference!"; Transliteration: "Osorubeki Sanshamendan!" (Japanese: おそるべき三者面談！)	Natsuko Takahashi	September 15, 2017	TBA
189	"Busters Treasure Edition #10: Miraculous Treasure-Filled Ruins"; Transliteration: "Basutāzutorejā hen No. 10 Kiseki no otakaradarake iseki" (Japanese: バスターズトレジャー編 #10 奇跡のオタカラダラケ遺跡)	Natsuko Takahashi	September 22, 2017	TBA
189	"Yo-kai Dozilla/Clodzilla"; Transliteration: "Yōkai dojira" (Japanese: 妖怪ドジラ)	Natsuko Takahashi	September 22, 2017	TBA
189	"Yo-kai Brooklin/Roughgraff"; Transliteration: "yōkai burukkurin" (Japanese: 妖怪ブルックりん)	Natsuko Takahashi	September 22, 2017	TBA
190	"Busters Treasure Edition #11: Targeted Nyanses II"; Transliteration: "Basutāzutorejā hen No. 11 nerawareshi Neko Nisei" (Japanese: バスターズトレジャー編 #11 ねらわれしネコ2世)	Keiichirō Ōchi	September 29, 2017	TBA
190	"Hailey's Yo-kai Sports Day"; Transliteration: "Inaho no Youkai Daiundoukai" (Japanese: イナホの妖怪大運動会)	Keiichirō Ōchi	September 29, 2017	TBA
190	"Yo-kai Senpoku-kanpoku/Frogetmenot"; Transliteration: "Yōkai Senpokukanpoku" (Japanese: 妖怪センポクカンポク)	Keiichirō Ōchi	September 29, 2017	TBA
191	"Busters Treasure Edition #12: Chomping Ice Cream Ruins"; Transliteration: "Basutāzutorejā hen No. 12 Morimorisofutokuri iseki" (Japanese: バスターズトレジャー編 #12 モリモリソフトクリ遺跡)	Takamitsu Kōno	October 6, 2017	TBA
191	"Yo-kai Hitoriyogari/Yoganalisten"; Transliteration: "Yōkai Hitoriyogari" (Japanese: 妖怪ひとりよがり)	Takamitsu Kōno	October 6, 2017	TBA
191	"Orochi and a Raccoon"; Transliteration: "orochi to kotanuki" (Japanese: オロチと子狸)	Takamitsu Kōno	October 6, 2017	TBA
192	"Busters Treasure Edition #13: Team Yokodori's Minecart Battle!"; Transliteration: "Basutāzutorejā hen No. 13 Yokodori-dan torokkobatoru!" (Japanese: バスターズトレジャー編 #13 ヨコドリ団 トロッコバトル！)	Yuka Yamada	October 13, 2017	TBA
192	"Yo-kai Yamatobokeru/Fitwit"; Transliteration: "Yōkai Yamato Bokeru" (Japanese: 妖怪ヤマトボケル)	Yuka Yamada	October 13, 2017	TBA
192	"Yo-kai Darumacho"; Transliteration: "Yōkai Darumaccho" (Japanese: 妖怪だるまっちょ)	Yuka Yamada	October 13, 2017	TBA
192	"The Last Nyamurai's Japon Expedition "Sushi""; Transliteration: "rasutobushinyan no japon no arukikata Sushi" (Japanese: ラストブシニャンのジャポンの歩き方 「スシ」)	Yuka Yamada	October 13, 2017	TBA
193	"Busters Treasure Edition #14: Halloween Gulp-gulp Ruins"; Transliteration: "Basutāzutorejā hen No. 14 Harowin gabugabu iseki" (Japanese: バスターズトレジャー編 #14 ハロウィンガブガブ遺跡)	Yōichi Katō	October 20, 2017	TBA
193	"Tomnyan's Trick or Treat, nyan!" Transliteration: "Tomunyan no torikku oa torikkuda myau!" (Japanese: トムニャンのトリック・オア・トリックだミャウ！)	Yōichi Katō	October 20, 2017	TBA
194	"It's Great King Enma's Yo-kai Halloween, nyan!" Transliteration: "Enma-daiō no Yōkai Harōwin da nyan!" (Japanese: エンマ大王の妖怪ハロウィンだニャン！)	TBA	October 27, 2017	TBA
195	"Busters Treasure Edition #15: Indy VS High Tech"; Transliteration: "Basutāzutorejā hen No. 15 Indi vs Haiteku" (Japanese: バスターズトレジャー編 #15 インディVSハイテク)	TBA	November 3, 2017	TBA
195	"The Last Nyamurai's Culture Day"; Transliteration: "rasutobushinyan no Bunka no Hi" (Japanese: ラストブシニャンの文化の日)	TBA	November 3, 2017	TBA
195	"Yo-kai Otohime/Procrastinocchio"; Transliteration: "Yōkai Otohime" (Japanese: 妖怪乙姫)	TBA	November 3, 2017	TBA
196	"Busters Treasure Edition #16: Beautiful Handsome Ruins"; Transliteration: "Basutāzutorejā hen No. 16 Utsukushiki ikemēn iseki" (Japanese: バスターズトレジャー編 #16 美しきイケメーン遺跡)	TBA	November 10, 2017	TBA
196	"Yo-kai Sakinobashi/Princess Pearl"; Transliteration: "Yōkai Sakinobashi" (Japanese: 妖怪さきのばし)	TBA	November 10, 2017	TBA
196	"Yo-kai Narcis II"; Transliteration: "Yōkai Narushisu 2 Sei" (Japanese: 妖怪ナルシス2世)	TBA	November 10, 2017	TBA
197	"Busters Treasure Edition #17: Take Care of the Elderly"; Transliteration: "Basutāzutorejā hen No. 17 Otoshiyori wa taisetsu ni" (Japanese: バスターズトレジャー編 #17 お年寄りはたいせつに)	TBA	November 17, 2017	TBA
197	"Yo-kai Supyo"; Transliteration: "Yōkai Namigappa" (Japanese: 妖怪なみガッパ)	TBA	November 17, 2017	TBA
197	"Yo-kai Yorosan and Kabusan/Armsman and Helmsman"; Transliteration: "Yōkai yoroi-san to kabuto-san" (Japanese: 妖怪ヨロイさんとカブトさん)	TBA	November 17, 2017	TBA
198	"Busters Treasure Edition no 18: River Descent Race in the Rafting Ruins"; Transliteration: "Basutāzutorejā hen No. 18 Ikkāda iseki no kawa kudari rēsu!" (Japanese: バスターズトレジャー編 #18 イッカーダ遺跡の川くだりレース！)	TBA	November 24, 2017	TBA
198	"Yo-Kai Docchikazu/Swaycorn"; Transliteration: "Yōkai Dotchitsukazu" (Japanese: 妖怪どっちつかず)	TBA	November 24, 2017	TBA
198	"Yo-kai Great Battle: Arachnus vs Toadal Dude: Round 1"; Transliteration: "Youkai Daigassen Tsuchigumo vs Ōgama Ikkaisen" (Japanese: 妖怪大合戦 土蜘蛛VS大ガマ 一回戦)	TBA	November 24, 2017	TBA
199	"Busters Treasure Edition #19: Are Bachino Returns!"; Transliteration: "Basutāzutorejā hen No. 19 Are batchīno futatabi!" (Japanese: バスターズトレジャー編 #19 アレ・バッチーノふたたび！)	TBA	December 1, 2017	TBA
199	"Busters Treasure Edition #20: Nyanses II's Secret"; Transliteration: "Basutāzutorejā hen No. 20 neko 2-sei no himitsu" (Japanese: バスターズトレジャー編 #20 ネコ2世の秘密)	TBA	December 1, 2017	TBA
200	"The Great Adventure of the Flying Komasan and the Wishing World!"; Transliteration: "Soratobu koma-san to moshimo sekai no dai bōken zura!" (Japanese: 空飛ぶコマさんともしも世界の大冒険ズラ！)	TBA	December 8, 2017	TBA
200	"Busters Treasure Edition #21: Merry Cursemas Returns!"; Transliteration: "Basutāzutorejā hen No. 21 merīkurushimimasu iseki" (Japanese: バスターズトレジャー編 #21 メリークルシミマス遺跡)	TBA	December 8, 2017	TBA
201	"Yo-kai Squandeer"; Transliteration: "Yōkai Otonakai" (Japanese: 妖怪オトナカイ)	TBA	December 22, 2017	TBA
201	"Yo-kai Jeanne-Ne-Sais-Quoi"; Transliteration: "Yōkai Jankukoshino" (Japanese: 妖怪ジャンクコシノ)	TBA	December 22, 2017	TBA
202	"Happy New Year of the Dog! Komashura!"; Transliteration: "Inudoshi happiinūiyā! Shura koma arawaru!" (Japanese: 戌年ハッピイヌーイヤー！ しゅらコマあらわる！)	TBA	January 5, 2018	TBA
202	"Busters Treasure Edition #22: Happy Dog Ruins"; Transliteration: "Basutāzutorejā hen No. 22 Happiinū iseki" (Japanese: バスターズトレジャー編 #22 ハッピイヌー遺跡)	TBA	January 5, 2018	TBA
202	"Manjimutt's Pet Shop"; Transliteration: "Jin men inu no petto shoppu" (Japanese: じんめん犬のペットショップ)	TBA	January 5, 2018	TBA
203	"Yo-kai Great Battle: Arachnus vs Toadal Dude: Round 2"; Transliteration: "Youkai Daigassen Tsuchigumo vs Ōgama Nikaisen" (Japanese: 妖怪大合戦 土蜘蛛VS大ガマ 二回戦)	TBA	January 12, 2018	TBA
203	"Yo-kai Hurchin"; Transliteration: "Yōkai Chikuchiku uni" (Japanese: 妖怪チクチクウニ)	TBA	January 12, 2018	TBA
203	"Busters Treasure Edition #23: Risky O-X Quiz!"; Transliteration: "Basutāzutorejā hen No. 23 Inochigake no Marubatsu kuizu!" (Japanese: バスターズトレジャー編 #23 命がけの○×クイズ！)	TBA	January 12, 2018	TBA
204	"Busters Treasure Edition #24: Terrifying Word Chains"; Transliteration: "Basutāzutorejā hen No. 24 Kyōfu no shiri tori" (Japanese: バスターズトレジャー編 #24 恐怖のしりとり)	TBA	January 19, 2018	TBA
204	"Yo-kai Demuncher"; Transliteration: "Yōkai Onikui" (Japanese: 妖怪鬼食い)	TBA	January 19, 2018	TBA
204	"Damona's Great Matchmaking Strategy"; Transliteration: "Hyakki hime no o miai dai sakusen" (Japanese: 百鬼姫のお見合い大作戦)	TBA	January 19, 2018	TBA
205	"Yo-kai Drenchetta"; Transliteration: "Yōkai shimeppoīna" (Japanese: 妖怪シメッポイーナ)	TBA	January 26, 2018	TBA
205	"Katie and the Clean-up"; Transliteration: "Fumichan to osōji" (Japanese: フミちゃんとおそうじ)	TBA	January 26, 2018	TBA
205	"Busters Treasure Edition #25: Battle of Silence"; Transliteration: "Basutāzutorejā hen No. 25 chinmoku notatakai" (Japanese: バスターズトレジャー編 #25 沈黙の戦い)	TBA	January 26, 2018	TBA
206	"Busters Treasure Edition #26: The Last Treasure Medal!"; Transliteration: "Basutāzutorejā hen No. 26 Saigo no hihō medaru!" (Japanese: バスターズトレジャー編 #26 最後の秘宝メダル！)	TBA	February 2, 2018	TBA
206	"Yo-kai Blandon"; Transliteration: "Yōkai kagerō" (Japanese: 妖怪カゲロー)	TBA	February 2, 2018	TBA
206	"Yo-kai Eterna"; Transliteration: "yōkai Fujimi Gozen" (Japanese: 妖怪ふじみ御前)	TBA	February 2, 2018	TBA
207	"Busters Treasure Edition #27: Yodelsen's Big Resurrection!"; Transliteration: "Basutāzutorejā hen No. 27 Dai fukkatsu! Yōderusen!" (Japanese: バスターズトレジャー編 #27 大復活！ヨーデルセン！)	TBA	February 9, 2018	TBA
207	"Let's go through Valentine's Day"; Transliteration: "Barentain o surū seyo!" (Japanese: バレンタインをスルーせよ！)	TBA	February 9, 2018	TBA
208	"Busters Treasure Edition #28: The Last Great Great Great Battle!"; Transliteration: "Basutāzutorejā hen No. 28 Saigo no dai dai dai kessen!" (Japanese: バスターズトレジャー編 #28 最後の大大大決戦！)	TBA	February 16, 2018	TBA
208	"Opening! Halitofest!"; Transliteration: "kaimaku! Haraitafesu!" (Japanese: 開幕！ハライタフェス！)	TBA	February 16, 2018	TBA
209	"Yo-kai Slurpent"; Transliteration: "Yōkai Yamatan" (Japanese: 妖怪やまタン)	TBA	February 23, 2018	TBA
209	"Yo-kai Great Battle: Arachnus vs Toadal Dude: Round 3"; Transliteration: "Youkai Daigassen Tsuchigumo vs Ōgama Sankaisen" (Japanese: 妖怪大合戦 土蜘蛛VS大ガマ 三回戦)	TBA	February 23, 2018	TBA
209	"Yo-kai Spewart"; Transliteration: "Yōkai Yotcha" (Japanese: 妖怪ヨッチャ～)	TBA	February 23, 2018	TBA
210	"Yo-kai Comic Genieus"; Transliteration: "Yōkai Riakushon daiō" (Japanese: 妖怪リアクション大王)	TBA	March 2, 2018	TBA
210	"Get Together for Hinamatsuri"; Transliteration: "min'na de nakayoku hina matsuri" (Japanese: みんなで仲良くひなまつり)	TBA	March 2, 2018	TBA
210	"The Piggybank of Fear"; Transliteration: "kyōfu no chokin-bako" (Japanese: 恐怖の貯金箱)	TBA	March 2, 2018	TBA
211	"Busters Treasure Extra Edition: Cindy's Great Great Great Adventure!"; Transliteration: "Basutāzutorejā Bangaihen Shindi no dai dai dai bōken!" (Japanese: バスターズトレジャー番外編 シンディの大大大冒険！)	TBA	March 9, 2018	TBA
211	"A White Day once Every 100 Years"; Transliteration: "100-nen ni ichido no howaitodē" (Japanese: 100年に一度のホワイトデー)	TBA	March 9, 2018	TBA
211	"Yo-kai Herbiboy"; Transliteration: "Yōkai Kusakui Otoko" (Japanese: 妖怪草くいおとこ)	TBA	March 9, 2018	TBA
212	"Yo-kai Great Battle: Arachnus vs Toadal Dude: Fourth Round"; Transliteration: "Youkai Daigassen Tsuchigumo vs Ōgama Yonkaisen" (Japanese: 妖怪大合戦 土蜘蛛VS大ガマ 四回戦)	TBA	March 16, 2018	TBA
212	"Yo-kai Inflammaboy"; Transliteration: "Yōkai Gekikara Bōi" (Japanese: 妖怪激辛ボーイ)	TBA	March 16, 2018	TBA
212	"Komasan Bus"; Transliteration: "Komasan Basu" (Japanese: コマさんバス)	TBA	March 16, 2018	TBA
213	"Komasam and Komajiro's Japanese Whole Country Journey: In Okayama"; Transliteration: "Koma-san koma Jirō no nipponzenkoku mongei tabi in Okayama" (Japanese: コマさんコマじろうの日本全国もんげー旅 IN岡山)	TBA	March 23, 2018	TBA
213	"Yo-kai Sushiyama"; Transliteration: "Yōkai Yamato" (Japanese: 妖怪やまと)	TBA	March 23, 2018	TBA
213	"The Strongest!? Birth of RoboWhisper"; Transliteration: "Saikyou!? Robowisupā Tanjou!" (Japanese: 最強！？ロボウィスパー誕生！)	TBA	March 23, 2018	TBA
214	"Town of Yo-kai"; Transliteration: "Youkai no Iru Machi" (Japanese: 妖怪のいる街)	TBA	March 30, 2018	TBA
One morning, Jibanyan catches the dreadful "Yo-kai Gudenguden Fever", causing his temperature to rise to 367C (692.6F), and other strange effects. As Nate's attempts to cool him down fail, more and more people start forgetting about Jibanyan entirely. Nate must to find a cure before it's too late util he meets Jibanyan's owner Amy for first time. Note: This is the final episode of Yo-kai Watch.

== DVD releases ==
Kadokawa Media Factory (Japan, Region 2 DVD)
Volume		Episodes	Release date
Yo-kai Watch (妖怪ウォッチ)	Volume 1	1–5	May 28, 2014
Yo-kai Watch (妖怪ウォッチ)	Volume 2	6–9	June 25, 2014
Yo-kai Watch (妖怪ウォッチ)	Volume 3	10–13	July 30, 2014
Yo-kai Watch (妖怪ウォッチ)	Volume 4	14–17	January 27, 2016
Yo-kai Watch (妖怪ウォッチ)	Volume 5	18–21	September 24, 2014
Yo-kai Watch (妖怪ウォッチ)	Volume 6	22–25	October 29, 2014
Yo-kai Watch (妖怪ウォッチ)	Volume 7	26–29	November 26, 2014
Yo-kai Watch (妖怪ウォッチ)	Volume 8	30–33	December 19, 2014
Yo-kai Watch (妖怪ウォッチ)	Volume 9	34–37	January 28, 2015
Yo-kai Watch (妖怪ウォッチ)	Volume 10	38–41	February 25, 2015
Yo-kai Watch (妖怪ウォッチ)	Volume 11	42–45	March 25, 2015
Yo-kai Watch (妖怪ウォッチ)	Volume 12	46–49	April 29, 2015
Yo-kai Watch (妖怪ウォッチ)	Volume 13	50–53	May 27, 2015
Yo-kai Watch (妖怪ウォッチ)	Volume 14	54–57	July 24, 2015
Yo-kai Watch (妖怪ウォッチ)	Volume 15	58–62	August 26, 2015
Yo-kai Watch (妖怪ウォッチ)	Volume 16	63–66	September 25, 2015
Yo-kai Watch (妖怪ウォッチ)	Volume 17	67–70	October 28, 2015
Yo-kai Watch (妖怪ウォッチ)	Volume 18	71–74	November 25, 2015
Yo-kai Watch (妖怪ウォッチ)	Volume 19	75–78	December 18, 2015
Yo-kai Watch (妖怪ウォッチ)	Volume 20	79–82	December 18, 2015
Yo-kai Watch (妖怪ウォッチ)	Volume 21	83–86	January 27, 2016
Yo-kai Watch (妖怪ウォッチ)	Volume 22	87–90	February 24, 2016
Yo-kai Watch (妖怪ウォッチ)	Volume 23	91–94	February 24, 2016
Yo-kai Watch 2016 (妖怪ウォッチ 2016)	Volume 1	95–98	April 27, 2016
Yo-kai Watch 2016 (妖怪ウォッチ 2016)	Volume 2	99–102	May 25, 2016
Yo-kai Watch 2016 (妖怪ウォッチ 2016)	Volume 3	103–106	July 27, 2016
Yo-kai Watch 2016 (妖怪ウォッチ 2016)	Volume 4	107–110	August 24, 2016
Yo-kai Watch 2016 (妖怪ウォッチ 2016)	Volume 5	111–113	September 28, 2016
Yo-kai Watch 2016 (妖怪ウォッチ 2016)	Volume 6	114–117	October 26, 2016
Yo-kai Watch 2016 (妖怪ウォッチ 2016)	Volume 7	118–121	November 25, 2016
Yo-kai Watch 2016 (妖怪ウォッチ 2016)	Volume 8	122–125	November 25, 2016
Yo-kai Watch 2016 (妖怪ウォッチ 2016)	Volume 9	126–129	January 25, 2017
Yo-kai Watch 2016 (妖怪ウォッチ 2016)	Volume 10	130–133	February 24, 2017
Yo-kai Watch 2016 (妖怪ウォッチ 2016)	Volume 11	134–137	March 24, 2017
Yo-kai Watch 2016 (妖怪ウォッチ 2016)	Volume 12	138–141	March 24, 2017
Yo-kai Watch 2017 (妖怪ウォッチ 2017)	Volume 1	142–145	April 26, 2017
Yo-kai Watch 2017 (妖怪ウォッチ 2017)	Volume 2	146–149	May 26, 2017
Yo-kai Watch 2017 (妖怪ウォッチ 2017)	Volume 3	150–153	July 26, 2017
Yo-kai Watch 2017 (妖怪ウォッチ 2017)	Volume 4	154–157	July 26, 2017
Yo-kai Watch 2017 (妖怪ウォッチ 2017)	Volume 5	158–161	August 23, 2017
Yo-kai Watch 2017 (妖怪ウォッチ 2017)	Volume 6	162–164	September 27, 2017
Yo-kai Watch 2017 (妖怪ウォッチ 2017)	Volume 7	165–168	October 25, 2017
Yo-kai Watch 2017 (妖怪ウォッチ 2017)	Volume 8	169–172	November 29, 2017
Yo-kai Watch 2017 (妖怪ウォッチ 2017)	Volume 9	173–176	November 29, 2017
Yo-kai Watch 2017 (妖怪ウォッチ 2017)	Volume 10	177–180	January 24, 2018
Yo-kai Watch 2017 (妖怪ウォッチ 2017)	Volume 11	181–184	January 24, 2018
Yo-kai Watch 2017 (妖怪ウォッチ 2017)	Volume 12	185–188	February 23, 2018
Yo-kai Watch 2017 (妖怪ウォッチ 2017)	Volume 13	189–192	February 23, 2018
Yo-kai Watch 2018 (妖怪ウォッチ 2018)	Volume 1	193–196	April 25, 2018
Yo-kai Watch 2018 (妖怪ウォッチ 2018)	Volume 2	197–200	April 25, 2018
Yo-kai Watch 2018 (妖怪ウォッチ 2018)	Volume 3	201–204	May 25, 2018
Yo-kai Watch 2018 (妖怪ウォッチ 2018)	Volume 4	205–208	May 25, 2018
Yo-kai Watch 2018 (妖怪ウォッチ 2018)	Volume 5	209–211	July 25, 2018
Yo-kai Watch 2018 (妖怪ウォッチ 2018)	Volume 6	212–214	July 25, 2018
Yo-kai Watch DVD BOX (妖怪ウォッチ DVD BOX)	Volume 1	1–21	October 29, 2014
Yo-kai Watch DVD BOX (妖怪ウォッチ DVD BOX)	Volume 2	22–41	March 25, 2015
Yo-kai Watch DVD BOX (妖怪ウォッチ DVD BOX)	Volume 3	42–62	September 25, 2015
Yo-kai Watch DVD BOX (妖怪ウォッチ DVD BOX)	Volume 4	63–82	December 18, 2015
Yo-kai Watch DVD BOX (妖怪ウォッチ DVD BOX)	Volume 5	83–102	October 26, 2016
Yo-kai Watch DVD BOX (妖怪ウォッチ DVD BOX)	Volume 6	103–121	November 25, 2016
Yo-kai Watch DVD BOX (妖怪ウォッチ DVD BOX)	Volume 7	122–141	March 24, 2017
Yo-kai Watch DVD BOX (妖怪ウォッチ DVD BOX)	Volume 8	142–161	October 25, 2017

Roadshow Entertainment (Australia, Region 4 DVD)
Volume	Episodes	Release date
Yo-kai Are Real!	1–7	March 2, 2016
Komasan In The City	8-13	June 1, 2016
Movin' On Up!	14-20	February 1, 2017
Complete Series 1		May 1, 2019

NCircle Entertainment (USA, Region 1 DVD)
Volume	Episodes	Release date
Yo-kai Watch: Season 1, Volume 1	1–13	February 26, 2019
Yo-kai Watch: Season 1, Volume 2	14-26	September 3, 2019
