= Space Dance! =

2015 single by Kotori with Stitch Bird

Single by Kotori with Stitch Bird

from the album Yo-kai Watch Music Best - Second Season
- Released: September 16, 2015
- Length: 4:37
- Label: FRAME

Kotori with Stitch Bird singles chronology
"Space Dance!" (2015)	"Earthling" (2016)

Music video
- "Space Dance!" on YouTube

"Space Dance!" (Japanese: 宇宙ダンス!, Hepburn: Uchū Dance!) is the debut single by Kotori with Stitch Bird, a Japanese music group created by Level-5 CEO Akihiro Hino, formed of Dream5 member Kotori Shigemoto, Yulia, and Yuka. Released on September 16, 2015, "Space Dance!" was the 5th ending theme to the 2014 Yo-kai Watch TV-series, succeeding "Yo-kai Exercise No. 2".

== Background and releases ==
"Space Dance!" is the debut single by Kotori with Stitch Bird, a Japanese music group formed to bring new direction to the music of the 2014 TV-series Yo-kai Watch, which "Space Dance!" is the 5th ending theme for. The song was choreographed by Lucky Ikeda, who had previously choreographed multiple other Yo-kai Watch themes, such as "Gera Gera Po" and "Don-Don-Dooby-Zoo-Bah!".

"Space Dance!" started being used as the new ending theme to the Yo-kai Watch TV-series in the first episode of the series' second season, "Usapyon Is Here!" (aired July 10, 2015). The single was released digitally on iTunes on July 11, 2014, and was later released as a CD and DVD on September 16, under the FRAME label. The CD release was bundled with a physical Yo-kai Medal of the character Usapyon, in addition to a QR code, that would give the scanner a digital coin to use in Yo-kai Watch: Wibble Wobble.

The song has also appeared in other pieces of Yo-kai Watch media, including Yo-kai Watch: Enma Daiō to Itsutsu no Monogatari da Nyan!, where it was one of the two ending themes, and Yo-kai Watch Dance: Just Dance Special Version, where it was one of the game's 10 songs.

== Chart performance ==
"Space Dance!" made a total of 12 appearances on the weekly Oricon Singles Chart, where it peaked at number five for the week of September 28, 2015. The song also made one appearance on the Billboard Japan Hot 100 chart at number 58 during the week of October 3, 2015.

== Track listing ==
CD single
No.	Title	Length
1.	"Space Dance!"	4:37
2.	"Flapping -Theme of Stitch Bird-"	4:27
3.	"Space Dance!" (Karaoke)	4:37
4.	"Flapping -Theme of Stitch Bird-" (Karaoke)	4:27

== Charts ==
Chart performance for "Space Dance!"
Chart (2014)	Peak position
Japan (Oricon)	5
Japan Hot 100 (Billboard)	58
