= List of Yo-kai Watch media =

Yo-kai Watch (Japanese: 妖怪ウォッチ, Hepburn: Yōkai Wotchi) is a supernaturalist multimedia franchise created by Level-5. The franchise is mainly known for its series of role-playing video games, which have been released for various different video game platforms. The franchise also includes several spin-off video games, anime and anime films, manga series, soundtracks, and strategy guides, among other media. The franchise's anime series are produced by OLM and the manga series are published by Shogakukan, who have serialized the series in various different magazines.

Yo-kai Watch was developed as a multimedia franchise, as Level-5 CEO Akihiro Hino believed it to be one of the main factors that made an IP long-lasting. Installments in the franchise are usually set in the fictitious region of Springdale and follows Nathan "Nate" Adams, an 11-year-old average 5th grader student who acquires the titular Yo-kai Watch, allowing him to see supernatural entities, named Yo-kai.

== Video games ==
=== Main series ===
Game	Details
Yo-kai Watch Original release dates: JP: July 11, 2013; NA: November 6, 2015; AU: December 5, 2015; EU: April 29, 2016	Release years by system: 2013 – Nintendo 3DS
Yo-kai Watch Original release dates: JP: July 11, 2013; NA: November 6, 2015; AU: December 5, 2015; EU: April 29, 2016	Notes: Published by Nintendo outside of Japan.; Auto-battler role-playing game.
Yo-kai Watch 2 Original release dates: JP: July 10, 2014; NA: September 30, 2016; AU: October 15, 2016; EU: April 7, 2017	Release years by system: 2014 – Nintendo 3DS
Yo-kai Watch 2 Original release dates: JP: July 10, 2014; NA: September 30, 2016; AU: October 15, 2016; EU: April 7, 2017	Notes: Released in three different versions: Bony Spirits, Fleshy Souls, and Psychic Specters.; Published by Nintendo outside of Japan.; Auto-battler role-playing game.
Yo-kai Watch 3 Original release dates: JP: July 16, 2016; PAL: December 7, 2018; NA: February 8, 2019	Release years by system: 2016 – Nintendo 3DS
Yo-kai Watch 3 Original release dates: JP: July 16, 2016; PAL: December 7, 2018; NA: February 8, 2019	Notes: Released in three different versions in Japan: Sushi, Tempura, and Sukiyaki.; Introduces a secondary protagonist, named Hailey Anne.; Takes place in two main settings, Springdale and BBQ, with Nate's sections of the games taking place in BBQ, whereas Hailey Anne's sections take place in Springdale.; Published by Nintendo outside of Japan.; Grid-based tactical role-playing game.
Yo-kai Watch 4 Original release date: JP: June 20, 2019; WW: TBA	Release years by system: 2019 – Nintendo Switch, PlayStation 4
Yo-kai Watch 4 Original release date: JP: June 20, 2019; WW: TBA	Notes: An enhanced version of the game, Yo-kai Watch 4++, was released on December 5, 2019.; Action role-playing game.

=== Spin-offs ===
Game	Details
Yo-kai Taiso Dai-ichi Puzzle da Nyan Original release date: JP: July 18, 2013	Release years by system: 2013 – Android, iOS
Yo-kai Taiso Dai-ichi Puzzle da Nyan Original release date: JP: July 18, 2013	Notes: Released to promote the song "Yōkai Taisō Dai Ichi".
Yo-kai Watch: Tomodachi UkiUkipedia Original release date: JP: January 30, 2014	Release years by system: 2014 – Arcade
Yo-kai Watch: Tomodachi UkiUkipedia Original release date: JP: January 30, 2014	Notes: An arcade game based on the Yo-kai Watch franchise, developed by Bandai as an entry in their Data Carddass series.
Yo-kai Watch Blasters Original release dates: JP: July 11, 2015; WW: September 7, 2018	Release years by system: 2015 – Nintendo 3DS
Yo-kai Watch Blasters Original release dates: JP: July 11, 2015; WW: September 7, 2018	Notes: Released in two different versions: Red Cat Corps and White Dog Squad.; Known in Japan as Yo-kai Watch Busters.; A free expansion to the game, titled Moon Rabbit Crew, was first released on December 12, 2015.; Published by Nintendo outside of Japan.
Yo-kai Watch: Wibble Wobble Original release dates: JP: October 21, 2015; NA/AU: March 24, 2016; EU: March 30, 2017	Release years by system: 2015 – Android, iOS
Yo-kai Watch: Wibble Wobble Original release dates: JP: October 21, 2015; NA/AU: March 24, 2016; EU: March 30, 2017	Notes: Known in Japan as Yo-kai Watch: Puni-puni.; A "match-three" puzzle game, developed by NHN PlayArt Corporation.; The English versions of the game were discontinued on May 31, 2018.
Yo-kai Watch Dance: Just Dance Special Version Original release date: JP: December 5, 2015	Release years by system: 2015 – Wii U
Yo-kai Watch Dance: Just Dance Special Version Original release date: JP: December 5, 2015	Notes: A spin-off installment in the Just Dance series of dance games.; Co-developed with Ubisoft.
Yo-kai Watch Busters: Iron Oni Force Original release date: JP: December 25, 2015	Release years by system: 2015 – Arcade
Yo-kai Watch Busters: Iron Oni Force Original release date: JP: December 25, 2015	Notes: An arcade game released as a tie-in to Yo-kai Watch Blasters.; Developed by Bandai as an entry in their Data Carddass series.
Yo-kai Watch Land Original release dates: NA: January 19, 2016	Release years by system: 2016 – Android, iOS
Yo-kai Watch Land Original release dates: NA: January 19, 2016	Notes: Co-developed with Hasbro.; Discontinued on December 31, 2018.
Yo-kai Sangokushi Original release date: JP: April 2, 2016	Release years by system: 2016 – Nintendo 3DS
Yo-kai Sangokushi Original release date: JP: April 2, 2016	Notes: A crossover with the Romance of the Three Kingdoms video game series.; Developed by Koei Tecmo.
Yo-kai Watch Busters 2: Secret of the Legendary Treasure Bambalaya Original release date: JP: December 16, 2017	Release years by system: 2017 – Nintendo 3DS
Yo-kai Watch Busters 2: Secret of the Legendary Treasure Bambalaya Original release date: JP: December 16, 2017	Notes: Released in two different versions: Sword and Magnum.; The sequel to Yo-kai Watch Blasters.
Yo-kai Daijiten Original release date: JP: 2017	Release years by system: 2017 – Android, iOS
Yo-kai Daijiten Original release date: JP: 2017	Notes: A quiz-based role-playing game.
Yo-kai Sangokushi: Kunitori Wars Original release date: JP: January 11, 2018	Release years by system: 2018 – Android, iOS
Yo-kai Sangokushi: Kunitori Wars Original release date: JP: January 11, 2018	Notes: Co-developed with Koei Tecmo.
Yo-kai Watch: Gerapo Rhythm Original release date: JP: May 10, 2018	Release years by system: 2018 – Android, iOS
Yo-kai Watch: Gerapo Rhythm Original release date: JP: May 10, 2018	Notes: A rhythm game featuring songs from the Yo-kai Watch franchise.
Yo-kai Watch World Original release date: JP: June 27, 2018	Release years by system: 2018 – Android, iOS
Yo-kai Watch World Original release date: JP: June 27, 2018	Notes: An augmented reality game, developed by GungHo Online Entertainment.
Yo-kai Watch: Medal Wars Original release date: JP: July 30, 2019	Release years by system: 2019 – Android, iOS
Yo-kai Watch: Medal Wars Original release date: JP: July 30, 2019	Notes: Developed by Netmarble.; Discontinued on December 3, 2020.
Yo-kai Watch Jam: Yo-kai Academy Y - Yeah-Yeah School Life Original release date: JP: August 13, 2020	Release years by system: 2020 – Nintendo Switch, PlayStation 4
Yo-kai Watch Jam: Yo-kai Academy Y - Yeah-Yeah School Life Original release date: JP: August 13, 2020	Notes: Based on the Yo-kai Watch spin-off anime Yo-kai Watch Jam: Yo-kai Academy Y: Close Encounters of the N Kind.

=== Other ===
Game	Details
Yo-kai Taiso Dai-ichi Puzzle da Nyan DX Original release date: JP: March 17, 2015	Release years by system: 2014 – Android
Yo-kai Taiso Dai-ichi Puzzle da Nyan DX Original release date: JP: March 17, 2015	Notes: A remastered version of Yo-kai Taiso Dai-ichi Puzzle da Nyan, with added content.; Distributed by NTT Docomo, and was only available for a limited amount of time.
Yo-kai Watch 1 for Nintendo Switch Original release date: JP: October 10, 2019	Release years by system: 2019 – Nintendo Switch; 2021 – Android, iOS
Yo-kai Watch 1 for Nintendo Switch Original release date: JP: October 10, 2019	Notes: A remastered version of the first Yo-kai Watch game, with some added content.; Ported to mobile devices as Yo-kai Watch 1 SmaPho on July 10th 2021.

== Television and films ==
=== TV series ===
Title	Original run	Episodes	Studio	Notes
Yo-kai Watch	January 8, 2014 – March 31, 2018	214	OLM, Inc.	Ran for three seasons, and was broadcast on several different networks.
Yo-kai Watch Shadowside	April 13, 2018 – March 29, 2019	49	OLM, Inc.	Ran for one season, and was broadcast via the TX Network. A follow-up of the fourth Yo-kai Watch film, Yo-kai Watch Shadowside: Oni-ō no Fukkatsu.
Yo-kai Watch!	April 5, 2019 – December 20, 2019	36	OLM, Inc., Magic Bus	Ran for one season, and was broadcast via the TX Network; A sequel to the 2014 Yo-kai Watch TV series.
Yo-kai Watch Jam: Yo-kai Academy Y: Close Encounters of the N Kind	December 27, 2019 – April 2, 2021	63	OLM, Inc.	Told from the perspective of Jinpei Jiba, the main protagonist of the Yo-kai Watch Jam the Movie: Yo-kai Academy Y - Can a Cat be a Hero? film. A follow-up of the sixth Yo-kai Watch film, Yo-kai Watch Jam the Movie: Yo-kai Academy Y - Can a Cat be a Hero?
Yo-kai Watch♪	April 9, 2021 – March 31, 2023	98	OLM, Inc., Magic Bus	Distributed by TV Tokyo, and is broadcast across six affiliated networks. A sequel to the 2019 Yo-kai Watch! TV series.

=== Films ===
Title	Initial release date	Production company
Yo-kai Watch: The Movie	December 20, 2014	OLM, Inc.
Notes: Shares elements with the Yo-kai Watch 2.; First released in Western territories on October 15, 2016.
Yo-kai Watch: Enma Daiō to Itsutsu no Monogatari da Nyan!	December 19, 2015	OLM, Inc.
Yo-kai Watch: Soratobu Kujira to Double no Sekai no Daibōken da Nyan!	December 17, 2016	OLM, Inc.
Notes: Split between both animated and live action scenes.
Yo-kai Watch Shadowside: Oni-ō no Fukkatsu	December 16, 2017	OLM, Inc.
Notes: An animated horror comedy, set 30 years after the 2014 Yo-kai Watch, 2019 Yo-kai Watch! and 2021 Yo-kai Watch♪ TV series.
Yo-kai Watch: Forever Friends	December 14, 2018	OLM, Inc.
Notes: Set in Tokyo in the 1960s, set 60 years before the 2014 Yo-kai Watch TV series and follows a new main protagonist named Shin Shimomachi.
Yo-kai Watch Jam the Movie: Yo-Kai Academy Y - Can a Cat be a Hero?	December 13, 2019	OLM, Inc.
Notes: Focuses on a new main protagonist, named Jinpei Jiba.; Released alongside the Yo-kai Watch Jam: Yo-kai Academy Y: Close Encounters of the N Kind TV series.
Yo-kai Watch♪ the Movie: How Nate and I Met Nyan!♪ M-Me Too~♪♪	November 12, 2021	OLM, Inc.
Yo-kai Watch♪: Jibanyan vs. Komasan - The Big Amazing Battle, Nyan	January 13, 2023	OLM, Inc.

== Soundtracks ==
Title	Release date	Length	Label
Yo-kai Watch Original Soundtrack	December 17, 2014	3:38:29	Frame
Notes: Features music from the first two Yo-kai Watch video games.; Composed by Kenichiro Saigo, with a feature from King Cream Soda.; Peaked at 34 on the Oricon Albums Chart.
Completely Preserved Edition! Geragerapo Athletic Meet and Bon Odori	May 20, 2015	33:10	Frame
Notes: Features renditions of various tracks from the Yo-kai Watch anime.; Composed by Tomoki Kikuya, Yoichi Murata, and Goyo Sato.
Yo-kai Watch Theme Song ~ Christmas Version ~	November 18, 2015	41:41	Frame
Notes: Features Christmas renditions of tracks from the original Yo-kai Watch anime series.; Composed by Tomoki Kikuya and Goyo Sato.
Yo-kai Watch Music Best - First Season	January 20, 2016	49:16	Frame
Notes: Features the opening and ending themes to the first season of the original Yo-kai Watch anime.; Includes tracks by King Cream Soda, Dream5, and NyaKB.; Peaked at 20 on the Oricon Albums Chart.
Yo-kai Watch Original Soundtrack Movie	December 21, 2016	43:39	Frame
Notes: Features music from Yo-kai Watch: The Movie.; Composed by Kenichiro Saigo.
Yo-kai Watch Music Best - Second Season	January 25, 2017	43:47	Frame
Notes: Features the opening and ending themes from the second season of the original Yo-kai Watch anime series.; Includes tracks by King Cream Soda, Kotori with Stitchbird, and LinQ.; Peaked at 88 on the Oricon Albums Chart.
Yo-kai Watch Original Soundtrack TV Anime and Game (Yo-kai Watch Busters)	January 25, 2017	59:19	Frame
Notes: Features music from the original Yo-kai Watch anime series and the spin-off Yo-kai Watch Blasters video game.; Composed by Kenichiro Saigo.
Yo-kai Watch Original Soundtrack Game (Yo-kai Watch 3)	March 22, 2017	1:34:17	Frame
Notes: Features music from the Yo-kai Watch 3 video game.; Composed by Kenichiro Saigo.
Yo-kai Gakuen Y - Can a Cat be a Hero? (Original Soundtrack)	January 20, 2021	1:00:04	Universal Sigma
Notes: Features music from the Yo-kai Watch Jam the Movie: Yo-Kai Academy Y - Can a Cat be a Hero? film.; Composed by Kenichiro Saigo.
Yo-kai Gakuen Y ~ Waiwai Gakuen Seikatsu ~ (Original Soundtrack)	January 20, 2021	1:30:00	Universal Sigma
Notes: Features music from the spin-off Yo-kai Watch Jam: Yo-kai Academy Y - Yeah-Yeah School Life video game.; Composed by Kenichiro Saigo.

== Printed media ==
=== Manga ===
Title	Release date / original run	Volumes	Publisher
Yo-kai Watch	December 15, 2012 – April 21, 2023	23	Shogakukan
Notes: Written and illustrated by Noriyuki Konishi.; Serialized in CoroCoro Comic in Japan.; Published by Viz Media in North America, by Kazé in Spain and France, and by Shogakukan Asia in Singapore.; Won the award for best children's manga at both the 38th Kodansha Manga Awards and the 60th Shogakukan Manga Awards.
Yo-kai Watch: Nyanderful Days	December 27, 2013 – July 22, 2016	3	Shogakukan
Notes: Illustrated by Chikako Mori, and serialized in Ciao in Japan.; Published by Panini Comics in Mexico, by Norma Editorial in Spain, and by Elex Media Komputindo in Indonesia.; Follows the love interest of Nathan "Nate" Adams, Katie Forester.
Yo-kai Watch 4-Panel Pun Club	June 18, 2015 – December 5, 2018	5	Shogakukan
Notes: Authored by Santa Haruzaka.
Yo-kai Watch Busters	September 28, 2015	1	Shogakukan
Notes: Illustrated by Atsushi Ohba, and serialized in CoroCoro Comic.; Based on the Yo-kai Watch Blasters spin-off game.
4-koma Yo-kai Watch - Geragera Manga Gekijo	November 28, 2015 – July 27, 2018	3	Shogakukan
Notes: Illustrated by Runba Kokonasu, and serialized in CoroCoro Comic Special.; Published by Elex Media Komputindo in Indonesia.
Komasan 〜A Time for Fireworks and Miracles〜	December 11, 2015	1	Shogakukan
Notes: Illustrated by Sho Shibamoto, and serialized in the Hibana magazine.
Yo-kai Gakuen Y	December 13, 2019 – January 28, 2021	3	Shogakukan
Notes: Written and illustrated by Noriyuki Konishi, and serialized in CoroCoro Comic.; Based on the spin-off anime Yo-kai Watch Jam: Yo-kai Academy Y: Close Encounters of the N Kind.

=== Strategy guides ===
Title	Release date	ISBN	Publisher
Yo-kai Watch Official Strategy Guide	August 30, 2013	9784091065261	Shogakukan
Notes: Contains information on the original Yo-kai Watch video game.; Written by Koichi Toshida, Masami Yamada, and Hiroken Mizuno.
Yo-kai Watch 2: Original / Honke Official Strategy Guide	August 22, 2014	9784091065438	Shogakukan
Notes: Contains information on the Bony Spirits and Fleshy Souls versions of Yo-kai Watch 2.; Written by Koichi Toshida and Masami Yamada.
Yo-kai Watch Card Game Strategy Guidebook	May 28, 2015	9784091065476	Shogakukan
Notes: Contains information on the Yo-kai Watch collectible card game.; Written by Koichi Toshida and Hiroshi Furushiro.
Yo-kai Watch 2: Ganso / Honke / Shinhatsu Official Complete Strategy Guide	January 31, 2015	9784091065506	Shogakukan
Notes: Contains information on all three versions of Yo-kai Watch 2.; Written by Koichi Toshida and Masami Yamada.
Yo-kai Watch Standard Edition Guide	November 6, 2015	9780744016710	Prima Games
Notes: Contains information on the original Yo-kai Watch video game.; Written by Ricka Barba and Michael Owen.
Yo-kai Watch Busters: Akanekodan / Shiroinutai Official Complete Strategy Guide	September 8, 2015	9784091065681	Shogakukan
Notes: Contains information on the Red Cat Corps and White Dog Squad versions of Yo-kai Watch Blasters.; Written by Michihiro Nagaoka, Koichi Toshida, and Masami Yamada.
Yo-kai Watch Busters Official Complete Strategy Guide	February 10, 2016	9784091065780	Shogakukan
Notes: Contains information on both versions of Yo-kai Watch Blasters, and its expansion, Moon Rabbit Crew.; Written by Michihiro Nagaoka and Koichi Toshida.
Yo-kai Sangokushi Official Complete Strategy Guide	June 2, 2016	9784091065841	Shogakukan
Notes: Contains information on Yo-kai Sangokushi.; Written by Michihiro Nagaoka, Koichi Toshida, and Masami Yamada.
Yo-kai Watch: Official Guide	June 28, 2016	9781338054422	Scholastic
Notes: Contains information on the Yo-kai Watch universe.; Written by Meredith Rusu.
Yo-kai Watch 3: Sushi / Tempura Official Complete Strategy Guide	September 17, 2016	9784091065889	Shogakukan
Notes: Contains information on the Sushi and Tempura versions of Yo-kai Watch 3.; Written by Koichi Toshida and Masami Yamada.
Yo-kai Watch: Essential Handbook	June 28, 2016	9781338058314	Scholastic
Notes: Contains information on the Yo-kai Watch series' different Yo-kai.; Written by Meredith Rusu.
Yo-kai Watch 3: Sukiyaki Official Strategy Guide	February 23, 2017	9784091065933	Shogakukan
Notes: Contains information on the Sukiyaki version of Yo-kai Watch 3.; Written by Koichi Tushida and Masami Yamada.
Yo-kai Watch 2: The Definitive Yo-kai-pedia	September 29, 2017	9780744018318	Prima Games
Notes: Contains information on the Psychic Specters version of Yo-kai Watch 2.; Written by Rick Barba.
Yo-kai Watch Busters 2 Official Complete Strategy Guide	February 26, 2018	9784091066138	Shogakukan
Notes: Contains information on both version of Yo-kai Watch Busters 2: Secret of the Legendary Treasure Bambalaya.; Written by Koichi Toshida and Masami Yamada.
Yo-kai Watch World All-Round Guidebook	July 31, 2018	9784091066176	Shogakukan
Notes: Contains information on the Yo-kai Watch World mobile game.
Yo-kai Watch 4 Official Strategy Guide	June 23, 2019	9784091066237	Shogakukan
Notes: Contains information on Yo-kai Watch 4.; Written by Koichi Toshida and Masami Yamada.

=== Other ===
Title	Release date	Media type	Publisher
Activity books	July 22, 2014 – December 7, 2016	Paperback	Shogakukan
Notes: Since 2014, Shogakukan has published a total of 15 activity books on the Yo-kai Watch franchise, which have been authored by various different people.
Yo-kai Watch for Toddlers	September 10, 2014 – August 5, 2015	Paperback	Shogakukan
Notes: A two-part series of Yo-kai Watch children's novels, published by Shogakukan.
Sticker books	December 1, 2014 – December 14, 2018	Paperback	Shogakukan
Notes: A six-part series of Yo-kai Watch sticker albums based primarily on the Yo-kai Watch films.
Yo-kai Watch: All Yo-kai Encyclopedia	March 20, 2015 – November 18, 2016	Paperback	Shogakukan
Notes: A five-part book series of Yo-kai Watch encyclopedias, published by Shogakukan.; Installments one through four were written by Akihiro Hino.
Yo-kai Watch: Jibanyan Tojo no Maki	July 24, 2015	Paperback	Shogakukan
Notes: A children's novel published by Shogakukan.
Yo-kai Watch: Iza Shobu! Businyan Maki	December 3, 2014	Paperback	Shogakukan
Notes: A children's novel published by Shogakukan.
Yo-kai Watch: Pop-up Book	April 22, 2015	Hardcover	Shogakukan
Notes: A Yo-kai Watch pop-up book, published by Shogakukan.
Yo-kai Watch: Once Upon a Time	November 18, 2015 – July 27, 2016	Paperback	Shogakukan
Notes: A two-part series of children's novels illustrated by Miho Asada and published by Shogakukan.
Yo-kai Watch: Turn Over da Nyan	December 2, 2015	Hardcover	Shogakukan
Notes: A children's novel illustrated published by Shogakukan.
Yo-kai Watch: Chapter Book	June 28, 2016 – December 27, 2016	Paperback, ebook	Scholastic
Notes: A two-part series of novels, published by Scholastic.; Written by Kate Howard.
Yo-kai Watch: Reader	June 28, 2016 – December 27, 2016	Paperback, ebook	Scholastic
Notes: A two-part series of children's novels, published by Scholastic.; First installment written by Meredith Rusu, whereas the second was written by Maria Barbo.
Yo-kai Watch: Epic Showdown	August 30, 2016	Paperback	Scholastic
Notes: A children's novel written by Meredith Rusu and published by Scholastic.
