= Gera Gera Po Song =

- Original CD and digital download cover

Single by King Cream Soda

from the album Bye Bye Gera Gera Po
- Language: Japanese
- B-side: "Yo-kai Exercise No. 1"
- Released: April 30, 2014
- Genre: J-pop; hip-hop; min'yō; rock; anison
- Length: 4:10
- Label: Frame
- Composer: Tomoki Kikuya
- Lyricist: Motsu

King Cream Soda singles chronology
"Gera Gera Po Song" (2014)	"Matsuribayashi de Gera Gera Po" / "Hatsukoi Tōge de Gera Gera Po" (2014)

Music video
- "Gera Gera Po Song" on YouTube

"Gera Gera Po Song" (Japanese: ゲラゲラポーのうた, Hepburn: Gera Gera Pō no Uta; lit. 'Hahaha Song') (Note: The title's spelling of the word uta (meaning 'song') is varied. The original 2014 release uses the hiragana form うた, whereas the 2021 re-recording uses the kanji form 唄.) is a song recorded by the Japanese music unit King Cream Soda. Tomoki Kikuya composed it and band member Gerappa (credited as Motsu) wrote the lyrics. King Cream Soda were formed specifically to perform the song, which was created as the opening theme for the anime adaptation of Level-5's multi-media franchise Yo-kai Watch. It was released as their debut CD single on April 30, 2014, by Frame, a joint venture record label owned by Level-5 and Avex Trax. Musically, "Gera Gera Po" is an upbeat track that quickly transitions between both Western and Japanese genres such as rock, hip-hop, pop, min'yō, and enka. The choruses feature repeating use of the rhythmic title phrase, "gera gera po".

Upon release, "Gera Gera Po Song" debuted at number four on the Oricon Singles Chart and number nine on the Billboard Japan Hot 100. It sold over 250,000 copies and was certified gold twice by the Recording Industry Association of Japan. Writers considered the track catchy and analyzed its popularity, particularly among children; some considered the song a social phenomenon. It won the Hot Topic Prize at the 2014 Japan Cable Awards and was named as one of the greatest and most memorable hits of 2014 by Tower Records Japan.

The song's music video was directed by DJ Hiro and features choreography created by Lucky Ikeda. The dance involves performers placing their hands above their stomach in accordance to "gera gera" and pointing their index fingers upwards on "po". Critics considered the choreography easy to learn and a factor to the song's success. King Cream Soda performed the song for various events, festivals, and television appearances, which included two-year consecutive appearances on NHK's New Year's Eve music special, Kōhaku Uta Gassen. The band released several follow-up songs that continued to use the "gera gera po" phrase. They were compiled onto their debut studio album, Bye Bye Gera Gera Po (2015), after which they retired the phrase. Alternate versions and a cover of "Gera Gera Po Song" have appeared in various Yo-kai Watch media.

== Background and release ==
Yo-kai Watch is a Japanese video game franchise developed by Level-5. The company's president and CEO, Akihiro Hino, designed the series to be a long-lasting property, akin to something like Doraemon. Since he believed that multiple forms of media would help in this regard, Level-5 produced various tie-ins alongside the main role-playing video game which released in 2013: a titular manga began serialization in December 2012, and an animated TV series premiered in January 2014.

The music publisher Avex Trax was involved with Yo-kai Watch's development from its early stages. The record label Frame—originally founded by Level-5 and Up-Front Works to release music from the former's Inazuma Eleven franchise—was repurposed as a joint venture with Avex for Yo-kai Watch. The music unit King Cream Soda was formed under Frame specifically to perform "Gera Gera Po Song", the opening theme for the series' anime. The group consists of three members, who use stage names when performing with the group: female vocalist Natsumi Aoi as Maiko, male vocalist Yūichi Ikuzawa as ZZRock, and rapper Mototaka Segawa as Gerappa. Profiles for the members were not released by their agency; officially, their reason for forming was said to be "the work of Yo-kai".

On April 30, 2014, Frame released "Gera Gera Po" as King Cream Soda's debut CD single with four tracks: the titular song, Maiko's cover of the ending theme "Yo-kai Exercise No. 1" originally by Dream5, and their instrumental karaoke versions. The single was preceded by two paid download-exclusive editions. A one-minute version used in the Yo-kai Watch anime was released on January 8, 2014, the same day as the show's premiere in Japan. The full track was released early on April 11, though this release did not contain the B-sides of the single version.

== Composition ==
"Gera Gera Po Song" (original version)
A sample of the first bridge's transition into the chorus. The former features Maiko's folk min'yō vocals. The latter incorporates the repeating phrase "gera gera po" above elements of Western and Japanese music genres.

"Gera Gera Po" was composed and arranged by Tomoki Kikuya, who tried to fuse the different musical expertises of King Cream Soda's three members. According to Sports Hochi's Kojima Kazuaki, the end result is a track within the genres of rock, rap, and min'yō. Writers for CDJournal described "Gera Gera Po" as an up-beat pop tune that blends Japanese and Western styles such as disco-pop, hip-hop, and min'yō. Even within the shorter version used in the anime, the composition quickly transitions between these sounds, going from sections with rap vocals to enka-styled phrases. According to sheet music published by Rittor Music, "Gera Gera Po" alternates between the keys of D and E major, and plays in a 4/4 time signature with an allegro tempo of 120 beats per minute. A score interpretation by Yamaha Music Entertainment notes that the song uses a dance rhythm.

The song's lyrics were written by Gerappa under the name Motsu, which was his stage moniker in a previous band, Move. The chorus features repeating use of the titular phrase "gera gera po", which builds to the song's rhythm. The line is a reference to a voice clip played after punch lines on Kyosen × Maetake Geba Geba 90-fun!, (Note: 巨泉・前武ゲバゲバ90分! (lit. '90 Minutes of Fury with Kyosen and Maetake!')) a popular variety show that ran on Nippon Television from 1969 to 71. According to CDJournal reviewers, King Cream Soda's vocal delivery on the track is comical; Kazuaki for Sports Hochi wrote that the lyrics of Maiko's slower min'yō sections depict "creepy" scenery, such as a tera temple on a gloomy evening.

The 2015 English dub of the anime uses an alternative version of the song that features different lyrics, but retains the original composition. The translated lyrics were written by producers Mark Risley and David H. Steinberg, and performed by Peter Michail and Kathryn Lynn.

== Reception ==
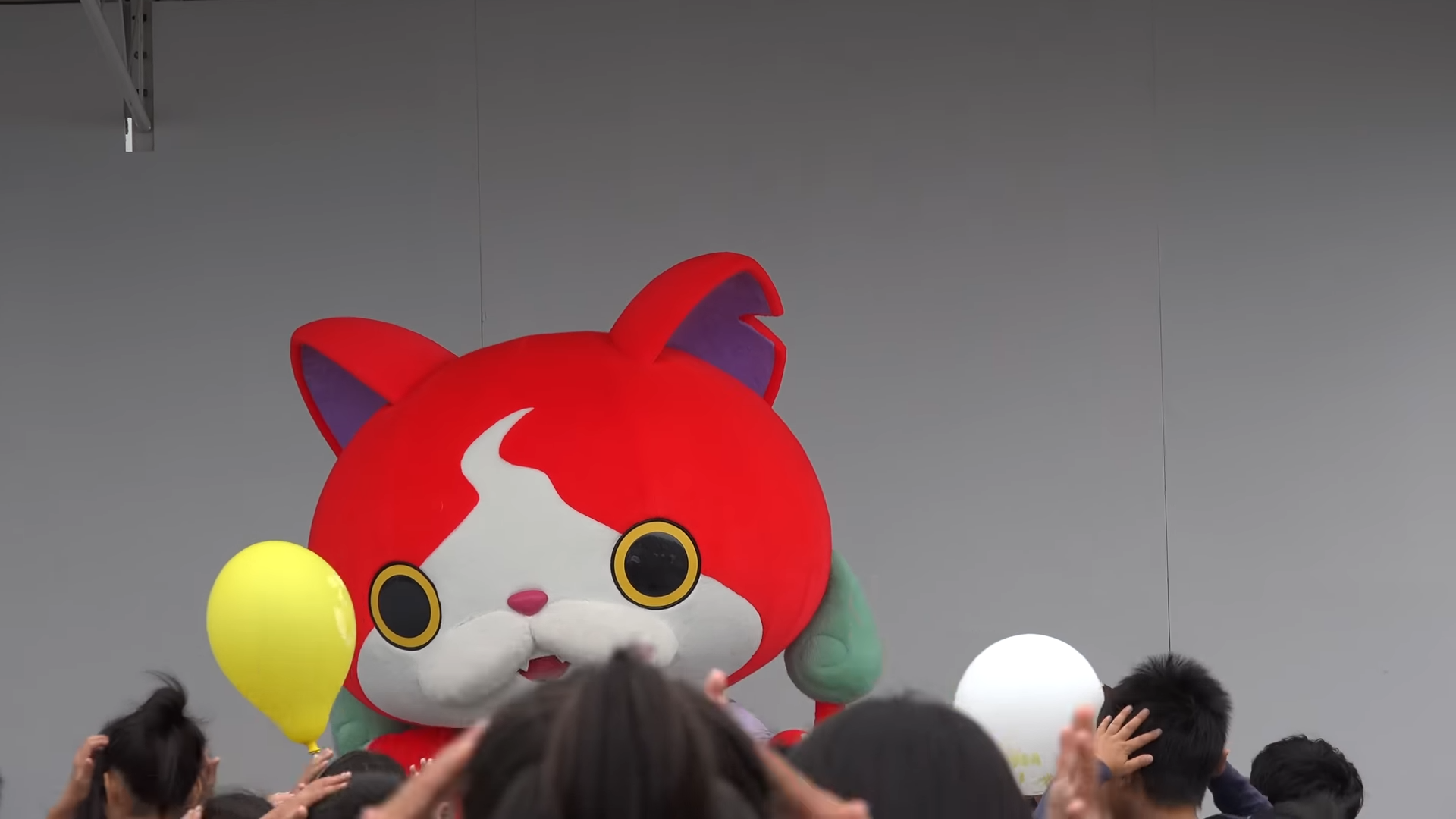
A Jibanyan mascot dancing to "Gera Gera Po" in front of a crowd of children in October 2014

Tower Records Japan listed "Gera Gera Po" as one of the five most successful and memorable tracks of 2014 and writers for CDJournal named it and "Yo-kai Exercise No. 1" among the greatest children's song hits of all time in a 2021 article. As the theme songs to Yo-kai Watch, "Gera Gera Po" and "Yo-kai Exercise No. 1" were joint recipients of the Hot Topic Prize at the 2014 Japan Cable Awards. Brian Ashcraft for The Japan Times described the song as "super catchy"; Crunchyroll News's Brittany Vincent gave the same compliment to the translated lyrics on the English version, which she considered surprisingly high quality. In a column for Real Sound, Fujiko Itabashi opined that the blend of genres such as rap and enka made the song "creepy" on first listen, but thought this unfamiliar composition and the repeating "gera gera po" hook ultimately makes the track addictive.

"Gera Gera Po" sold over 250,000 copies and was widely considered a hit. It was certified gold twice by the Recording Industry Association of Japan: the first for CD sales and the second for paid digital downloads. In the single's release week, it sold 22,310 copies and opened at number four on the Oricon Singles Chart dated May 12, 2014. The single stayed within the top 200 until May 2015 and charted a total of 52 weeks. On the Billboard Japan Hot 100, "Gera Gera Po" reached number 9 on the week dated May 9. It further charted on the anime song and adult contemporary sub-charts at numbers 4 and 64, respectively.

The song was particularly popular with children. A survey conducted by the music television program Music Station in May 2014 found it to be the most liked tune amongst first graders. Summarizing the results, a reporter for TechInsight wrote that the likes of Golden Bomber, Arashi, Kis-My-Ft2, and AKB48 failed to reach the popularity of the Yo-kai Watch anime and video game. Real Sound's Itabashi and the staff of the anime magazine LisAni! considered the song a social phenomenon. Itabashi compared its success to other theme songs of anime aimed towards kids—B.B.Queens's "Odoru Pompokolin" (1990) from Chibi Maruko-chan and Rica Matsumoto's "Pokémon Ieru Kana?" (1997) from Pokémon—in that they all feature a playful song structure and seemingly nonsensical but memorable hook. Siliconera's Sato wrote that it "wouldn't have been strange" for "Gera Gera Po" to replace "Kimigayo" as the national anthem of Japan during the peak of Yo-kai Watch's popularity in 2014, but that this virality had faded by the time of writing in 2017.

== Music video and choreography ==
A short rendition of the song's music video directed by DJ Hiro was released to Avex Trax's YouTube channel on April 3, 2014. The full version was released for digital download on April 11 and included on the CD single's special edition bonus DVD. The choreography was directed by Lucky Ikeda, who also worked on "Yo-kai Exercise No. 1" and would reprise his role for future Yo-kai Watch projects as well. In the "Gera Gera Po" dance, performers cross their arms in front of their chest in conjunction with "gera gera", and then point upwards using both index fingers on "po". An instructional video of the dance featuring Ikeda was released by Takarajimasha and Avex's exercise video sub-label, Avex Dancercize, as the DVD Gera Gera Po no Uta Dance Size DVD Book on December 29, 2012, which included a performance video of "Yo-kai Exercise No. 1" as bonus content.

Sports Hochi's Kazuaki and Ayumi Morimoto at the Aichi University of Education considered the dance easy to learn, which the former called a contributing factor to the song's popularity with children. Megumi Sato for the Otsuma Women's University compared the dance-accompanied popularity of "Gera Gera Po" to "Ebikanics" (2002), a song by the children's music group Keropons. Writing for Oricon, Shōko Wakamatsu believed that Ikeda's choreography was an underlying factor behind the scenes to the success of Yo-kai Watch. Retrospectively in 2024, Jean-Karlo Lemus for Anime News Network considered choreography to be a key part of the franchise and wrote: "For further proof of how integral the dances were to Yōkai Watch, I am forced to revive the 'Gera-Gera-Po' brainworm that's been sleeping in everyone's skulls for the past few years [sic]".

== Live performances ==
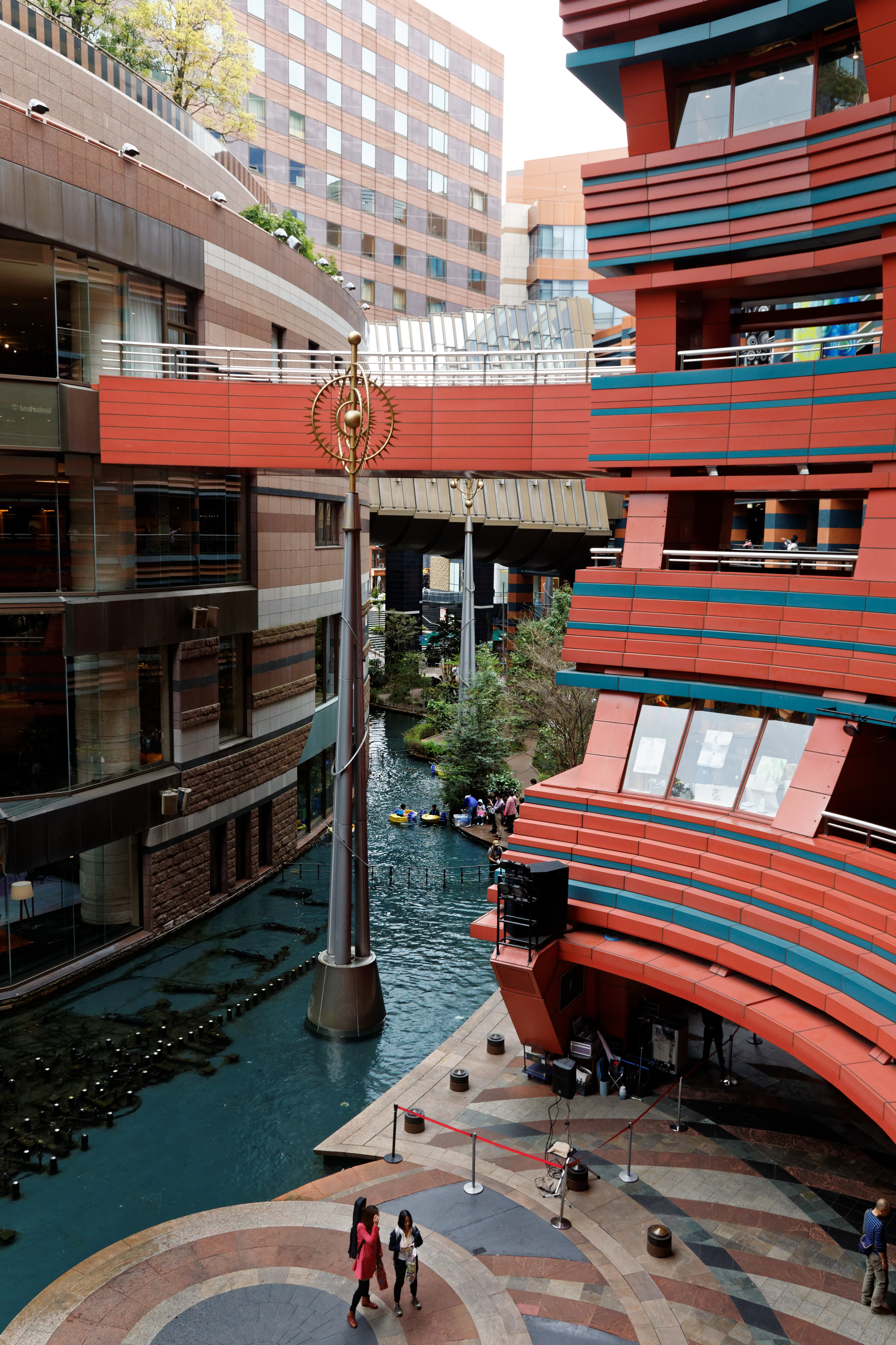
Prior to its release, King Cream Soda performed "Gera Gera Po" at the 2014 Game Fan in Fukuoka festival at Canal City Hakata (stage area pictured 2016).

Ahead of the CD single's release, King Cream Soda performed "Gera Gera Po" in late March 2014 at Canal City Hakata for Game Fan in Fukuoka, a video game-centered festival. Accompanied by a Yo-kai Watch-themed stamp rally, the band represented Level-5 at the event. According to a reporter for Famitsu, King Cream Soda resonated particularly well with the younger audience, who danced and sang along. Upon the single's release, the band gave live performances on music shows such as Music Station. In October 2014, King Cream Soda starred together with Dream5 on the boy band SMAP's titular program, SMAP×SMAP. The formermost performed "Gera Gera Po" together with the members of SMAP, who wore a toy of the DX Yo-kai Watch Type-Zeroshiki, a watch used by the protagonist in the series. A few days after, King Cream Soda sang "Gera Gera Po", "Yo-kai Exercise No. 1", and the follow-up "Matsuribayashi de Gera Gera Po" at a collaborative event between Yo-kai Watch and McDonald's Japan, where they greeted and shook hands with younger fans of the series. They reprised "Gera Gera Po" at the test screening for Yo-kai Watch: The Movie on December 14.

King Cream Soda were invited to appear at the 65th Kōhaku Uta Gassen on New Year's Eve 2014, an annual music special hosted by NHK. They appeared at a special segment, "Arashi Meets Yo-kai Watch", alongside Dream5 and the boy band Arashi; the latter were introduced with Yo-kai Watch-inspired nicknames, such as Shōnyan for Sho Sakurai in reference to Jibanyan. After Dream5 sang "Yo-kai Exercise No. 1" and Arashi their self-titled debut single, the three groups united to perform "Gera Gera Po" and its choreography. King Cream Soda performed their third single "Gerappo Dance Train" and "Gera Gera Po" at the Saitama Super Arena for Animelo Summer Live in August 2015. The band wore golden yellow outfits; to match, members of the audience changed their glow sticks to the same color. On December 25, 2015, King Cream Soda performed "Gera Gera Po" and "Yo-kai Exercise No. 1" with female idol group Momoiro Clover Z for Anime Kōhaku Uta Gassen, an in-person event hosted by Nippon Broadcasting. Six days later on New Year's Eve, the band reprised the song for the 66th NHK Kōhaku Uta Gassen, which marked their second consecutive appearance. They again appeared for a special segment, "Anime Kōhaku", which was dedicated to music from anime. (Note: Despite similar naming and timing, NHK's Anime Kōhaku and Nippon Broadcasting's Anime Kōhaku Uta Gassen are unrelated events.)

== Follow-ups and other versions ==
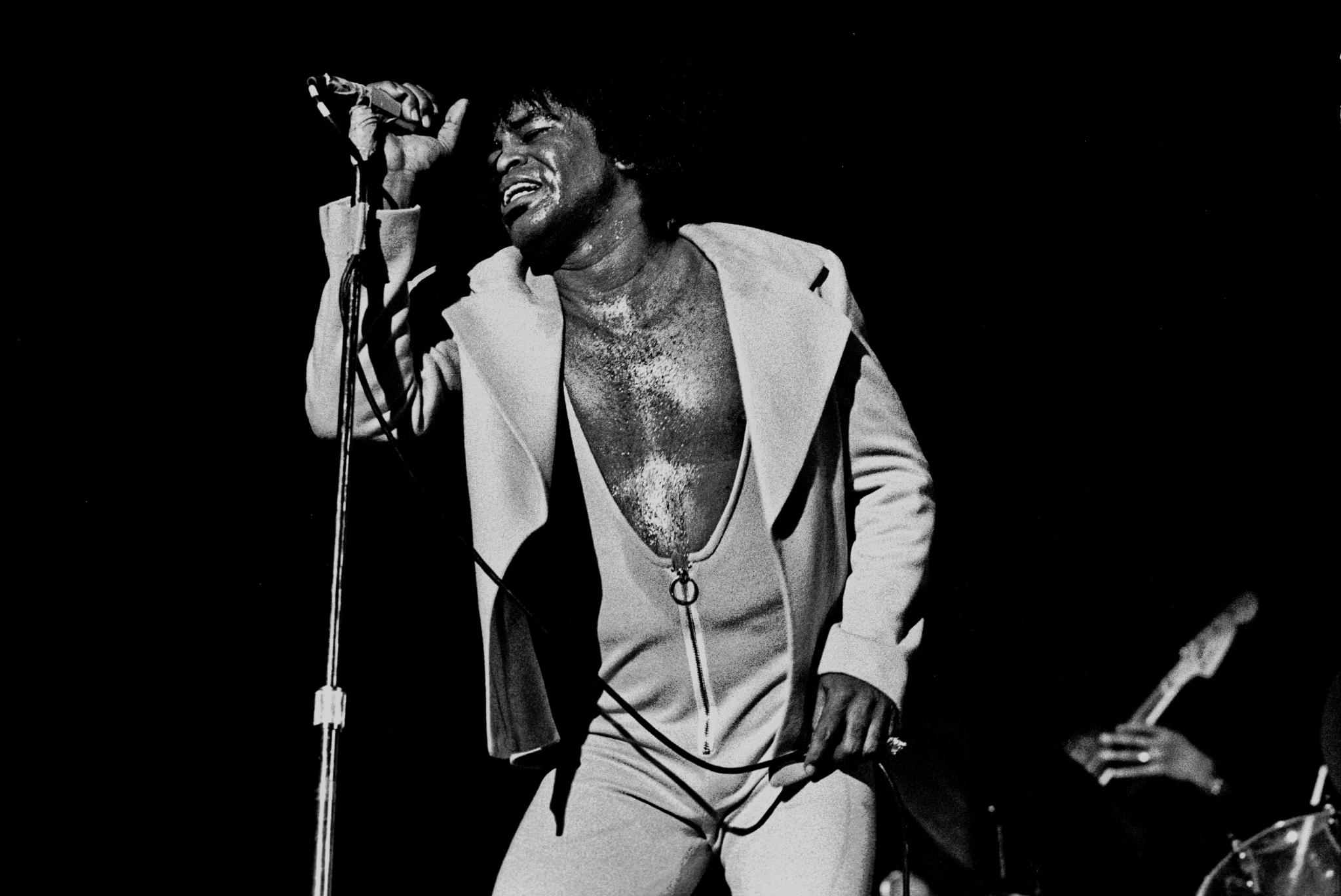
King Cream Soda's third single, "Gerappo Dance Train", alters the title phrase as a reference to "Get Up (I Feel Like Being a) Sex Machine" by James Brown (pictured 1973).

King Cream Soda recorded several follow-ups songs also utilizing the "gera gera po" hook. "Matsuribayashi de Gera Gera Po" (Note: Matsuribayashi de Gera Gera Pō (祭り囃子でゲラゲラポー; lit. 'Gera Gera Po with Festival Music')) and "Hatsukoi Tōge de Gera Gera Po" (Note: Hatsukoi Tōge de Gera Gera Pō (初恋峠でゲラゲラポー; lit. 'Gera Gera Po at the Mountain Peak of First Love')) were used as the respective opening themes to the Bony Spirits and Fleshy Souls versions of the video game Yo-kai Watch 2 (2014). "Matsuribayashi" combines rap sections with Japanese-styled melodies and somber lyrics about love at a summer festival. The lyrics of "Hatsukoi Tōge" are about the uncertainties and joys of first love; musically, it incorporates a funky beat on horn instruments above hip-hop and enka styles. The songs were released together as a double A-sided single on October 29, 2014. "Gera Gera Po Sōkyoku", (Note: Gera Gera Pō Sōkyoku (ゲラゲラポー早曲; lit. 'Gera Gera Po Marathon Song')) a collaboration with Dream5 performed under the name King Yo-kai Dream Soda, was used as the ending theme to Yo-kai Watch: The Movie and released as a download-exclusive on October 29, 2014.

King Cream Soda's third single, "Gerappo Dance Train", (Note: Gerappo Dansu Torein (ゲラッポ・ダンストレイン)) was released on April 29, 2015, and used as the theme song to Yo-kai Watch 2's third version, Psychic Specters. The alternate title phrase "gerappo" is a play on James Brown's pronunciation of "get up" on the 1970 song "Get Up (I Feel Like Being a) Sex Machine". "Gera Gera Po Song" and its follow-up versions were included on King Cream Soda's debut studio album, Bye Bye Gera Gera Po, on July 22, 2015. It served as a farewell to the phrase; their first song after the album, "Jinsei Dramatic", replaced "gera gera po" with a different line, "tan-tokoro-ten, tokoro-ten-ton-tan". "Gera Gera Po Song" was also included on Yo-kai Watch Music Best: First Season on January 20, 2016, a greatest hits album of songs from the anime.

Alternate versions of "Gera Gera Po" have appeared in remix albums. Brass band and bon odori arrangements of the song featured on Kanzen Hozon-ban! Gera Gera Pō na Undō-kai and Bon Odori, (Note: 完全保存版! ゲラゲラポーな運動会&盆踊り (lit. 'Complete Collector's Edition! Gera Gera Po Sports Day and Bon Odori')) released on May 20, 2015, and two instrumental Christmas renditions were included on Yo-kai Watch Theme Songs (Christmas Versions), released on November 18, 2015. "Gera Gera Po" also appeared in the Nintendo 3DS rhythm game Taiko no Tatsujin: Rhythmic Adventure 1 (2014), and in the Wii U-exclusive Just Dance crossover, Yo-kai Watch Dance: Just Dance Special Version (2015). A cover of "Gera Gera Po" by the Japanese rock band HardBirds was used as the opening theme to Yo-kai Watch 4 (2019). A re-recorded version of the song by King Cream Soda, used in the 2021 Yo-kai Watch♪ anime series, was released for download and streaming on April 9, 2021.

== Track listings ==
All music is composed and arranged by Tomoki Kikuya.

"Gera Gera Po Song" — CD single
No.	Title	Lyrics	Length
1.	"Gera Gera Po Song" (ゲラゲラポーのうた, Gera Gera Pō no Uta, lit. 'Hahaha Song')	Motsu	4:10
2.	"Yo-kai Exercise No. 1" (cover of Dream5; ようかい体操第一, Yōkai Taisō Dai-ichi)	Lucky Ikeda; Takashi Takagi	4:05
3.	"Gera Gera Po Song" (original karaoke)		4:10
4.	"Yo-kai Exercise No. 1" (original karaoke)		3:59
Total length:			16:25

"Gera Gera Po Song" — CD single (bonus DVD)

- "Gera Gera Po Song" (music video)
- "Yo-kai Exercise No. 1" (music video)
- "Gera Gera Po Song" (dance short version)

"Gera Gera Po Song" (anime opening version) — digital download

- "Gera Gera Po Song" (anime opening version) — 1:26

Digital download and streaming

- "Gera Gera Po Song" — 4:14

== Personnel and credits ==
King Cream Soda

- Mototaka Segawa/Motsu (as Gerappa) – rap vocals, lyrics
- Natsumi Aoi (as Maiko) – female vocals
- Yūichi Ikuzawa (as ZZRock) – male vocals

Production and other performers

- Tomoki Kikuya – composition, arrangement, guitar
- DJ Hiro – music video direction
- Lucky Ikeda – dance choreography

English version

- Peter Michail – male vocals
- Kathryn Lynn – female vocals
- Mark Risley – lyrics
- David H. Steinberg – lyrics
- Will Anderson – voice direction, mixing

== Charts ==
=== Weekly charts ===
Weekly chart performance for "Gera Gera Po Song"
Chart (2014)	Peak position
Japan Hot 100 (Billboard Japan)	9
Japan Adult Contemporary (Billboard Japan)	64
Japan Hot Animation (Billboard Japan)	4
Japan Singles (Oricon)	4

=== Monthly charts ===
Monthly chart performance for "Gera Gera Po Song"
Chart (2014)	Peak position
Japan Singles (Oricon)	13

=== Year-end charts ===
2014 year-end chart performance for "Gera Gera Po Song"
Chart (2014)	Position
Japan Hot 100 (Billboard Japan)	41
Japan Hot Animation (Billboard Japan)	6
Japan Singles (Oricon)	50

== Certifications ==
Certifications for "Gera Gera Po Song"
Region	Certification	Certified units/sales
Japan (RIAJ) CD single	Gold	156,586 (Note: Japanese CD sales for "Gera Gera Po Song" as of May 2015, compiled by Oricon from the single's chart history. Sales during weeks when the single did not chart are not accounted for.)
Japan (RIAJ) Digital download	Gold	100,000^{*}
^{*} Sales figures based on certification alone.

== Release history ==
Release dates and formats for "Gera Gera Po Song"
Region	Date	Version	Format(s)	Label	Ref.
Japan	January 8, 2014	Anime opening	Digital download	Frame	
Japan	April 11, 2014	Original	Digital download	Frame	
Japan	April 30, 2014	Original	CD single; CD+DVD	Frame	
Japan	November 7, 2014	Original	Rental CD	Frame	
Various	March 10, 2021	Original	Streaming	Frame	
Various	April 9, 2021	Re-recording	Digital download; streaming	Frame	

== Notes ==
Japanese titles and translations
