= Idol wa Ooh-Nya-Nya no Ken =

2015 single by NyaKB

Single by NyaKB

from the album Yo-kai Watch Music Best - First Season
- Language: Japanese
- B-side: "Fukō-chū no Saiwai Shōjo"
- Released: February 8, 2015
- Length: 3:53
- Label: Avex Trax; Frame
- Lyricist: Yasushi Akimoto

Music video
- "Idol wa Ooh-Nya-Nya no Ken" on YouTube

"Idol wa Ooh-Nya-Nya no Ken" (Japanese: アイドルはウーニャニャの件, Hepburn: Aidoru wa Ūnyanya no Ken) is a single by the AKB48 subgroup NyaKB. Released on April 8, 2015, the song was used the as the third ending theme to the 2014 Yo-kai Watch TV-series, succeeding "Don-Don-Dooby-Zoo-Bah!", and preceding "Yo-kai Exercise No. 2", both by Dream5.

== Background ==
"Idol wa Ooh-Nya-Nya no Ken" is the debut single by NyaKB, a Japanese idol group formed of members from the Japanese girl group AKB48, with the intent to make music for the Yo-kai Watch TV-series. NyaKB is based on the fictional group Next Harmeowny (ニャーKB, NyaKB) from the Yo-kai Watch series, which was originally made as a parody of AKB48. The subgroup, along with the song, was first announced at an AKB48 event held at the Tokyo Dome City Hall, in December 2014.

== Release and commercial performance ==
"Idol wa Ooh-Nya-Nya no Ken" first appeared in the Yo-kai Watch TV-series in its 51st episode, broadcast on January 9, 2015. The song was released for digital download on February 8 in Japan, with a CD release later releasing on April 8, after a commemorative event had been held for the song at Toyosu Pit music venue on March 30.

In the first few weeks of the song's CD release, the song had sold over 10,000 units, placing it first on Billboard Japan's Hot Singles Sales list for the week of April 20. The song made a total of twelve appearances on the weekly Oricon Singles Chart, where it peaked on April 20 at number two. The song also made an appearance on the Billboard Japan Hot 100 chart during the week of April 25, also at number two.

== Music video ==
The song's music video was choreographed by Lucky Ikeda, and was uploaded to Avex Trax's YouTube channel on March 23, 2015. The video features the seven members of NyaKB – Haruka Shimazaki, Jurina Matsui, Sakura Miyawaki, Rina Kawaei, Yuria Kizaki, Rena Kato, and Mako Kojima – in both real-life and animated forms. The video depicts the obsession that certain fans have with idol singers.

== Track listing ==
CD single
No.	Title	Length
1.	"Idol wa Ooh-Nya-Nya no Ken"	3:53
2.	"Fukō-chū no Saiwai Shōjo"	4:18
3.	"Idol wa Ooh-Nya-Nya no Ken" (Karaoke)	3:53
4.	"Fukō-chū no Saiwai Shōjo" (Karaoke)	4:19
Total length:		16:23

== Charts ==
Chart performance for "Idol wa Ooh-Nya-Nya no Ken"
Chart (2014)	Peak position
Japan (Oricon)	2
Japan Hot 100 (Billboard)	2

== Release history ==
Release dates and formats for "Idol wa Ooh-Nya-Nya no Ken"
Region	Date	Format	Label	Ref(s).
Japan	February 8, 2015	Digital download	Avex Trax	
Japan	April 8, 2015	CD	Frame	
Japan	April 8, 2015	CD+DVD	Frame	
