= Yo-kai Exercise No. 2 =

2015 single by Dream5

Single by Dream5

from the album Yo-kai Watch Music Best - First Season and the EP Colors
- Released: June 17, 2015
- Genre: J-pop
- Length: 5:00
- Label: FRAME
- Producer: Takashi Takagi

Dream5 singles chronology
"Don-Don-Dooby-Zoo-Bah!" (2014)	"Yo-kai Exercise No. 2" (2015)

Music video
- "Yo-kai Exercise No. 2" on YouTube

"Yo-kai Exercise No. 2" (Japanese: ようかい体操第二, Hepburn: Yōkai Taisō Dai-ni) is the 14th and final single by Japanese co-ed group Dream5. Released as a single on June 17, 2015, "Yo-kai Exercise No. 2" is the fourth Japanese ending theme to the 2014 Yo-kai Watch TV-series, succeeding "Don-Don-Dooby-Zoo-Bah!", also by Dream5, and preceding "Space Dance!" by Kotori with Stitch Bird.

== Background and release ==
"Yo-kai Exercise No. 2" acts as a sequel to Dream5's 12th single, "Yo-kai Exercise No. 1", which was also used as an ending theme to the Yo-kai Watch TV-series. Due to "Yo-kai Exercise No. 1" being "a hit", multiple Dream5 members stated that they felt pressured to make "Yo-kai Exercise No. 2" a good follow-up. The song was choreographed by Lucky Ikeda, who had previously choreographed multiple other songs for the Yo-kai Watch series, such as "Gera Gera Po" and "Don-Don-Dooby-Zoo-Bah!". According to Dream5 member Kotori Shigemoto, Ikeda based the choreography on the song's lyrics.

"Yo-kai Exercise No. 2" was first shown at the Level-5 Vision event on April 7, 2015, where it was performed live by Dream5. The song later debuted in the Yo-kai Watch TV-series as the new ending theme in episode 68, aired May 8, 2015. On the same day, a short version of the song was uploaded to YouTube by Avex Trax. The song was released as a CD and DVD later on June 17, under the FRAME label.

In December 2015, "Yo-kai Exercise No. 2" appeared as one of the 10 songs in Yo-kai Watch Dance: Just Dance Special Version.

== Chart performance ==
"Yo-kai Exercise No. 2" made nine appearances on the weekly Oricon Singles Chart, where it peaked at number 4. The song debuted on the Billboard Japan Hot 100 chart at number 47 for the week of July 4, 2015, before dropping to number 100 and leaving the chart in the following two weeks. "Yo-kai Exercise No. 2" also appeared on the Billboard Japan Hot Animation chart, where it peaked at number 7.

== Personnel ==
Credits adapted from the CD and DVD release of "Yo-kai Exercise No. 2".

- Takashi Takagi – producer
- Dream5 – vocals
- Lucky Ikeda – music video producer, choreography
- Kenichiro Kimura – coordination

== Track listing ==
CD single
No.	Title	Length
1.	"Yo-kai Exercise No. 2"	5:00
2.	"Shirokuro Tsukenai Koi Mo Aru"	1:26
3.	"Yo-kai Exercise No. 2" (Karaoke)	5:00
4.	"Shirokuro Tsukenai Koi Mo Aru" (Karaoke)	1:26

== Charts ==
Chart performance for "Yo-kai Exercise No. 2"
Chart (2015)	Peak position
Japan (Oricon)	4
Japan Hot 100 (Billboard)	47
