= Don-Don-Dooby-Zoo-Bah! =

2014 single by Dream5

Single by Dream5 featuring Sergeant Burly

from the album Yo-kai Watch Music Best - First Season
- B-side: "Summer Rainbow"
- Released: October 29, 2014
- Genre: J-pop
- Length: 4:51
- Label: FRAME
- Producers: Takashi Takagi; Tatsuo Higuchi

Dream5 singles chronology
"Yo-kai Exercise No. 1" (2014)	"Don-Don-Dooby-Zoo-Bah!" (2014)	"Yo-kai Exercise No. 2" (2015)

Music video
- "Don-Don-Dooby-Zoo-Bah!" on YouTube

"Don-Don-Dooby-Zoo-Bah!" (Japanese: ダン・ダン ドゥビ・ズバー!, Hepburn: Dan Dan Dubi Zubā!), also known as "Dan Dan Dubi Zuba!", is the 13th single by Japanese co-ed group Dream5. Released on October 29, 2014, the song was a collaboration with the fictional character Sergeant Burly and was used as the second ending theme to the 2014 Yo-kai Watch TV-series, replacing "Yo-kai Exercise No. 1".

"Don-Don-Dooby-Zoo-Bah!" had a positive commercial response, peaking at number one on the weekly Oricon Singles Chart and being certified gold by the Recording Industry Association of Japan (RIAJ), indicating over 100,000.

== Background and release ==
Dream5 first began working on the Yo-kai Watch series with "Yo-kai Exercise No. 1", which was the group's 12th single. Dream5's next single for the franchise ended up being "Don-Don-Dooby-Zoo-Bah!", which was intended to follow-up "Yo-kai Exercise No. 1". The song's dances was choreographed by Lucky Ikeda, who had choreographed the dances for multiple other Yo-kai Watch songs, most notably "Gera Gera Po".

"Don-Don-Dooby-Zoo-Bah!" first appeared as the credits theme to both versions of Yo-kai Watch 2 in Japan, released July 10, 2014. A day later, the song debuted in the Yo-kai Watch anime series as the new ending theme, replacing "Yo-kai Exercise No. 1". The song was released as a CD later on October 29, under the FRAME label. To promote the release of the CD, Dream5 and people in costumes of Yo-kai Watch characters performed the song live at the Ario Nishiarai shopping center. In December later the same year, "Don-Don-Dooby-Zoo-Bah!" was used as the ending theme to Yo-kai Watch: The Movie.

In 2015, "Don-Don-Dooby-Zoo-Bah!" was included in the rhythm game Yo-kai Watch Dance: Just Dance Special Version, as one of the game's 10 songs.

== Commercial performance ==
"Don-Don-Dooby-Zoo-Bah!" had a positive release in Japan, selling over 60,000 units in its first week of release. A few days later, the song was certified gold by the Recording Industry Association of Japan, indicating over 100,000 sales. The song debuted at first place on the weekly Oricon Singles Chart for the week of November 10, 2014. The same week, the song debuted on the Billboard Japan Hot 100 chart at number 3. In total, the song made twenty-five appearances on the Oricon Singles Chart and four appearances on the Billboard Japan Hot 100 chart.

== Personnel ==
Credits adapted from the CD release of "Don-Don-Dooby-Zoo-Bah!" and Twitter.

- Takashi Takagi – producer
- Tatsuo Higuchi – producer
- Dream5 – Japanese vocals
- Melissa Hutchison – English vocals
- Alicyn Packard – English vocals
- Brent Pendergrass – English vocals
- Kenichiro Kimura – coordination
- Lucky Ikeda – music video producer, choreography

== Track listing ==
CD single
No.	Title	Length
1.	"Don-Don-Dooby-Zoo-Bah!"	4:51
2.	"Summer Rainbow"	3:49
3.	"Don-Don-Dooby-Zoo-Bah!" (Karaoke)	4:51
4.	"Summer Rainbow" (Karaoke)	3:49
Total length:		17:20

== Charts ==
Chart performance for "Don-Don-Dooby-Zoo-Bah!"
Chart (2014)	Peak position
Japan (Oricon)	1
Japan (Billboard)	3

== Certifications ==
Region	Certification	Certified units/sales
Japan (RIAJ)	Gold	100,000^{^}
^{^} Shipments figures based on certification alone.
