= Yo-kai Watch Dance: Just Dance Special Version =

2015 video game

- Official cover art depicting characters from the game performing dances
- Developers: Level-5; Ubisoft (Note: Collaboration between Ubisoft Paris, Ubisoft Reflections, Ubisoft Montpellier, Ubisoft Bucharest, Ubisoft Milan and Ubisoft Pune)
- Publisher: Level-5
- Composer: Kenichiro Saigo
- Series: Just Dance; Yo-kai Watch
- Engine: UbiArt Framework
- Platform: Wii U
- Release: JP: December 5, 2015
- Genre: Dance
- Modes: Single-player, multiplayer

Yo-kai Watch Dance: Just Dance Special Version (Note: Known in Japan as 妖怪ウォッチダンス JUST DANCE(ジャストダンス) スペシャルバージョン) is a 2015 dance video game developed by Level-5 and Ubisoft, and published by Level-5 for the Wii U. The game is a collaboration between Level-5's Yo-kai Watch series and Ubisoft's Just Dance series, therefore being the fourth Japanese installment of the Just Dance series, and sees the players attempting to mimic dances performed by Yo-kai Watch characters in the game. The songs and dances featured in the game are originally from the Yo-kai Watch video games series and anime series.

== Gameplay ==
Like previous Just Dance installments, Yo-kai Watch Dance: Just Dance Special Version sees the players attempting to mimic dances performed by characters on-screen, which is then read by the Wii Remote's motion detection feature. The game is based on Just Dance 2014, with the user interface and features are largely identical to that said game, but it removes online multiplayer functionality ("World Dance Floor") and a few other features present in that game. Just like in Just Dance 2014, the Gamepad can be used to record "Autodance" videos (the effects can't be applied, however) via the camera to display lyrics on the Gamepad, in which the microphone is used to earn Mojo points. Players can also unlock avatars, named Yo-kai Badges, by using Mojo points on the Crank-a-kai, a gashapon-like mechanic, with 10 Mojo points for normal Yo-Kai Badges and 20 Mojo points for legendary Yo-Kai badges, which is carried to the main series as "Gift Machine", starting from Just Dance 2018. Additional avatars can also be unlocked by scanning the QR code on select Yo-Kai Watch merchandise via the camera on the Gamepad.

== Development and release ==
Yo-kai Watch Dance: Just Dance Special Version was primarily developed by Level-5, and was their first Wii U game. Ubisoft also assisted in development. It was based on Just Dance 2014, as in the previous Japanese installment in the Just Dance series, Just Dance Wii U. All of the online features, including the "World Dance Floor", were removed, just like in the previous game.

Yo-kai Watch Dance: Just Dance Special Version was first announced in the August 2015 issue of CoroCoro Comics, and was later corroborated by Nintendo on their official news website. The announcement showcased some of the game's dances and music. Two trailers for the game were later uploaded to YouTube by Level-5 in November later the same year. On the 39th page of the December 2015 issue of CoroCoro Comics, a QR code was featured which, when scanned in the game, would give the player Mojo points as well as a legendary Yo-kai Badge. A playable demo of the game was available at the World Hobby Fair Winter 2016.

Yo-kai Watch Dance: Just Dance Special Version was released on December 5, 2015. The game was bundled with a Yo-kai Medal of Sergeant Burly. A bundle with a white Wii Remote Plus was also released.

== Soundtrack ==
The game featured a total of 10 songs, all of which originated from the Yo-kai Watch franchise.

Song	Artist	Year
"Geragerapō no Uta"	King Cream Soda	2014
"Yōkai Taisō Dai Ichi"	Dream5	2014
"Matsuribayashi de Geragerapō"	King Cream Soda	2014
"Dan Dan Dubi Zubā!"	Dream5	2014
"Gerappo Dance Train"	King Cream Soda	2015
"Idol wa Ooh-Nya-Nya no Ken"	NyaKB	2015
"Yōkai Taisō Dai-Ni"	Dream5	2015
"Jinsei Dramatic"	King Cream Soda	2015
"Uchū Dance!"	Kotori with Stitch Bird	2015

== Reception ==
Reception

Review score
Publication	Score
Famitsu	28/40

Famitsu gave the game a score of 28/40, with each reviewer giving it a 7. Chris Carter, writing for Destructoid, described the game as "[mixing] the wonderful art of Yo-kai with the garish 'humans' from Just Dance".
