= Inazuma Eleven: Victory Road =

2025 video game

- Developer: Level-5
- Publisher: Level-5
- Director: Akihiro Hino
- Programmer: Satoshi Akitomi
- Artist: Takuzō Nagano
- Writer: Akahiro Hino
- Composer: Kenichiro Saigo
- Series: Inazuma Eleven
- Platforms: Nintendo Switch; Nintendo Switch 2; PlayStation 4; PlayStation 5; Windows; Xbox Series X/S
- Release: 13 November 2025
- Genres: Role-playing, sports
- Modes: Single-player, multi-player

Inazuma Eleven: Victory Road (Note: Japanese: イナズマイレブン 英雄たちのヴィクトリーロード, Hepburn: Inazuma Irebun Eiyū-tachi no Vikutorī Rōdo; lit. 'Inazuma Eleven: Victory Road of Heroes') is a 2025 sports role-playing video game developed by Level-5. It was released for Nintendo Switch, Nintendo Switch 2, PlayStation 4, PlayStation 5, Windows and Xbox Series X/S. It is the seventh main installment in the Inazuma Eleven series. As of January 2026, the game had sold over 800,000 copies.

A manga adaptation began serialization in the December 2025 issue of CoroCoro Comic and is currently running in Weekly CoroCoro.

A sequel, titled Inazuma Eleven: Bold Revolution, was announced on 10 September 2026. A release date has yet to be announced.

== Plot ==
=== Synopsis ===
Inazuma Eleven: Victory Road contains two separate narratives: Story Mode and Chronicle Mode

==== Story Mode ====
Story Mode is set 25 years after the events of the original Inazuma Eleven, in a new school called Nagumohara Junior High School (南雲原中学校, Southern Cloud Field; South Cirrus in the English dub), located in Nagasaki, Kyuushuu. The story primarily focuses on Unmei Sasanami (笹波 雲明, Sasanami Unmei; Destin Billows in the English dub), a boy who no longer play soccer due to a congenital heart disease contracted at a young age, which limits his physical abilities and prevents him from partaking in strenuous activities. Initially researching ways for him to continue ways, Unmei grows disheartened with lack of options and chooses instead to avoid soccer entirely, eventually leading him to choose to attend Nagumohara Junior High School, a school that dispanded its soccer club years prior. Witnessing the captain of the baseball team use soccer as a bullying tactic and making a mockery of the sport, Unmei decides to challenge him to a soccer battle (a 5-v-5 game) in order to allow them use of the field for the newly-formed soccer club. Unmei recruits fellow students to form his team, first to fulfil this challenge, then to build a team for the Football Frontier, the inter-school soccer competition. Nagumohara progresses through both the regional and national tournaments, owed to Unmei providing expert tactical analysis and strategy to allow them to outplay all opponents, eventually leading them to the final (this is referred to him traversing the "victory road" to the top of the mountain).

Unmei forms a bond with Endou Haru (円堂 ハル, Endō Haru; Harper Evans in the English dub), a 1st year striker at Raimon Junior High (the reigning champions), and the son of Endou Mamoru (the protagonist of the original Inazuma Eleven trilogy). Haru is described as a "soccer monster" due to his immense talent and overwhelming skill, but finds the game boring and has no passion for it, however a chance meeting with Unmei during a match (where Haru had joined the opposing team temporarily) piques his interest. After suffering an injury that prevents him from ever playing again (later revealed to be deliberately exaggerated), Haru leaves the club to travel the country and learn why people enjoy soccer, eventually leading to spending time in Nagasaki with Unmei and learning of his own background and challenges, which renews Haru's desire to overcome this injury and return to the game.

The final match is between Nagumohara and Raimon, where the player is allowed to choose which team they play for. Regardless of choice, Nagumohara end the first half leading 2-1. During the intermission, Haru returns to Raimon and is instantly subbed in for the second half. Raimon quickly score 2 goals, including Haru showing off his new special technique "Meteor Fire Tornado". With the Nagumohara team deflated and tired, Unmei brings himself in and swaps the positions of all other players on the team, the tactic he devised prior to the match. Upon the restart, Unmei instantly activates his special tactic Tenkuu no Takt (天空のタクト, Sky's Baton; Aether Virtuoso in the English dub) to instruct his players exactly as he needs, leading to them tying the score 3-3. Haru restores the lead by awakening his Keshin and using it to score a 4th goal, obliterating the Nagumohara goal in the process. Nagumohara later tie the game again, giving the player control of their chosen team to play out the remainder match. Regardless of result, the game ends with Unmei and Haru lying on the pitch, celebrating the match and their commitment to meeting at the highest point.

==== Chronicle Mode ====
Chronicle Mode takes place after the events of Inazuma Eleven GO 2: Chrono Stone in the far future where humanity is threatened by hyper-dimensional beings called Mind Eaters. Victorio Arno (ヴィクトリオ・アルノ, Vikutorio Aruno; Victorio Cryptix in the English dub) must travel through the history of the Inazuma Eleven series to gather a team of the strongest Eleven. He is assisted by returning characters Fei Rune and Wandaba (Wonderbot).

== Development ==
A part of the Inazuma Eleven series, it was announced as Inazuma Eleven Ares in 2016 and was set to be released in 2018 for PlayStation 4, Switch, Android, and iOS before being delayed to sometime after May 2019 in December 2018. The game was renamed to Inazuma Eleven: Great Road of Heroes and delayed to 2020 in September 2019. In April 2020, the game was delayed to 2021. It was delayed again to 2023 in April 2021. In July 2022, the title was changed to Inazuma Eleven: Victory Road. In November 2023, the game was announced to have been delayed again to 2024, while a PlayStation 5 version and a March 2024 worldwide beta were announced. In December 2023, a PC version was announced. In September 2024, a planned release in June 2025 was announced. In April 2025, a release date of August 21 (August 22 in Japan) was announced, with versions for Switch 2 and Xbox Series X/S, but the iOS and Android versions were cancelled. The release is digital-only. In July, the game was announced to be delayed yet again, with a release date of November 13.

The game was originally meant to tie into the anime series Inazuma Eleven: Ares that aired in Japan in 2018.

=== Beta testing and audience feedback ===
Level-5 released a beta playable version of Victory Road titled Inazuma Eleven: Victory Road Worldwide Beta Test Demo for the Nintendo Switch on March 18, 2024. Later, on July 18, 2024, the beta was released for the PlayStation 4, 5, and Steam platforms. The demo included a simple story mode, online competition mode and a VS Computer mode. In the Nintendo Switch and PlayStation versions, the online mode required a subscription to Nintendo Switch Online or PlayStation Plus, respectively in order to play. Upon the demo's release, Level-5 opened a survey to allow players of the demo to report bugs and issues related to the game. Furthermore, the beta included a Gallery mode, allowing players to unlock and view concept art of characters in-game.

As of February 2025, the demo was no longer downloadable on the Nintendo eShop and online play was no longer available, but those who have the demo downloaded could still access all offline modes. The demo remained available on other platforms until April 11, 2025, where too it would be delisted. Additionally, with the end of the demo's distribution on all platforms, the offline modes became inaccessible as well, including on Nintendo Switch.

== Reception ==
Reception

Aggregate score
Aggregator	Score
OpenCritic	96% recommend

Review score
Publication	Score
Famitsu	9/10, 9/10, 8/10, 9/10

In Japan, four critics from Famitsu gave the game a total score of 35 out of 40.

== Sequel ==
On 13 January 2026, game director and Level-5 president Akihiro Hino announced during an official live-stream that a sequel to Victory Road has entered production, and that he has begun writing its scenario. On 10 September 2026, the title of the sequel was officially revealed as Inazuma Eleven: Bold Revolution.
