= Takuzō Nagano =

Japanese illustrator (born 1979)

Takuzo Nagano
- 長野 拓造
- Born: June 1, 1979 (age 47); Fukuoka Prefecture, Japan
- Occupations: Video game artist; Character designer; Illustrator
- Years active: 2000s–present
- Employer: Level-5 Inc.
- Known for: Professor Layton series; Inazuma Eleven series; Yo-kai Watch series
- Notable work: Professor Layton; Inazuma Eleven; Yo-kai Watch; Mobile Suit Gundam AGE

Takuzo Nagano (長野 拓造 (Nagano Takuzō), born June 1, 1979) is a Japanese video game artist and character designer best known for his work at Level-5 Inc.. He is recognized as one of the company's principal character designers, having created the distinctive visual identities for several of Level-5's most successful multimedia franchises, including Professor Layton, Inazuma Eleven, and Yo-kai Watch.

== Early life and career ==
Nagano was born on June 1, 1979, in Fukuoka Prefecture, Japan. He studied at Tama Art University before joining Level-5 Inc., a video game development company founded by Akihiro Hino, where he became one of the company's lead character designers and art directors.

== Major works ==
=== Professor Layton series ===
Nagano's character designs for the Professor Layton series helped establish one of Level-5's most internationally successful franchises. His designs for Luke and Professor Layton, including the latter's iconic top hat, were required to be recognizable by form and color palette, particularly at small sizes. His work emphasized clear silhouettes and distinctive features that would translate well to the Nintendo DS's limited resolution.

He served as character designer for multiple entries, including Professor Layton and the Diabolical Box (2009) and Professor Layton and the Azran Legacy (2013). He also contributed original character designs and ending illustrations for the theatrical film Professor Layton and the Eternal Diva (2009) and provided character designs for the anime series Layton Mystery Tanteisha: Katori no Nazotoki File (2018) and the video game Layton's Mystery Journey: Katrielle and the Millionaires' Conspiracy (2017).

The series had sold over 18 million units by March 2023, retaining the title of Level-5's best-selling game franchise.

=== Inazuma Eleven series ===
Nagano created the original character designs for Level-5's soccer-themed RPG franchise Inazuma Eleven, which became phenomenally popular in Japan and Europe. His distinctive art style, characterized by expressive characters with dynamic poses and colorful designs, helped define the visual identity of the franchise across multiple games, anime series, and films.

His work spans numerous installments, including the original series, Inazuma Eleven GO, Inazuma Eleven GO: Chrono Stone, Inazuma Eleven GO Galaxy, Inazuma Eleven: Ares no Tenbin (2018), and Inazuma Eleven: Orion no Kokuin (2018–2019). He also provided original character designs for several theatrical films. In 2024, Nagano returned as original character designer for Inazuma Eleven: Victory Road and its compilation film Inazuma Eleven: The Movie (2025).

=== Yo-kai Watch franchise ===
In 2010, when Level-5 began developing Yo-kai Watch, art director Nagano was tasked by company president Akihiro Hino to design characters and settings. He worked alongside Miho Tanaka to create human characters and hundreds of yo-kai.

Nagano's first drafts drew inspiration from classic yo-kai manga like GeGeGe no Kitarō, but the final direction was adjusted to be more child-friendly, inspired by Doraemon. He focused on recognizable silhouettes and a "timeless" aesthetic blending modern-day settings with traditional yo-kai imagery.

He served as character and yo-kai designer for the entire Yo-kai Watch video game series, including Yo-kai Watch (2013), Yo-kai Watch 2 (2014), Yo-kai Watch 3 (2016), and subsequent entries. He also provided designs for anime series and films, including Yo-kai Watch: The Movie (2014) and the mixed live-action/animated film Yo-kai Watch the Movie 2016. Designs extended to spin-offs such as Yo-kai Watch Shadowside, Yo-kai Gakuen Y, and Yōkai Watch ♪.

=== Mobile Suit Gundam AGE ===
In 2011, Nagano provided original character designs for Mobile Suit Gundam AGE, marking a collaboration between Level-5 and the long-running Gundam franchise. He focused on young-audience-friendly, easily readable characters, with Michinori Chiba adapting his concepts for animation. He continued through the compilation OVA Mobile Suit Gundam AGE: Memory of Eden (2013).

=== Other projects ===
- Danball Senki – Original character designs for the mecha franchise and its sequel Danball Senki W
- Megaton Musashi – Original character designs and animation supervisor (2021–2023)
- Wonder Flick – Boss monster design (2013)
- Fantasy Life – Character design contributions (2012)

== Design philosophy and style ==
Nagano's designs are known for clarity, expressiveness, and cross-media adaptability:

- Clear silhouettes
- Bold color use
- Expressive faces and dynamic poses
- Blend of contemporary and nostalgic aesthetics

== Legacy and impact ==
Nagano shaped the visual identity of multiple Level-5 franchises, making him a key figure in the company's international success. His designs for Professor Layton, Inazuma Eleven, and Yo-kai Watch have been widely adapted across games, anime, and merchandise.

== Personal life ==
Nagano occasionally shares artwork on social media. Work requests should go through Level-5 Inc.

== Filmography ==
=== Video games ===
Year	Title	Role	Platform(s)	Ref.
2007	Professor Layton and the Curious Village	Character Designer	Nintendo DS	
2008	Inazuma Eleven	Original Character Designer	Nintendo DS	
2009	Professor Layton and the Diabolical Box	Character Designer	Nintendo DS	
2009	Professor Layton and the Unwound Future	Character Designer	Nintendo DS	
2009	Inazuma Eleven 2	Original Character Designer	Nintendo DS	
2010	Professor Layton and the Last Specter	Character Designer	Nintendo DS	
2010	Inazuma Eleven 3	Original Character Designer	Nintendo DS	
2011	Danball Senki	Original Character Designer	PlayStation Portable	
2011	Professor Layton and the Miracle Mask	Character Designer	Nintendo 3DS	
2011	Inazuma Eleven GO	Original Character Designer	Nintendo 3DS	
2012	Danball Senki W	Original Character Designer	PlayStation Portable	
2012	Professor Layton vs. Phoenix Wright: Ace Attorney	Character Concept Artist (Layton Series)	Nintendo 3DS	
2012	Fantasy Life	Character Designer	Nintendo 3DS	
2012	Inazuma Eleven GO 2: Chrono Stone	Original Character Designer	Nintendo 3DS	
2013	Professor Layton and the Azran Legacy	Character Designer	Nintendo 3DS	
2013	Wonder Flick	Boss Monster Designer	Multiple	
2013	Inazuma Eleven GO Galaxy	Original Character Designer	Nintendo 3DS	
2013	Yo-kai Watch	Character and Yo-kai Designer	Nintendo 3DS	
2014	Yo-kai Watch 2	Character and Yo-kai Designer	Nintendo 3DS	
2016	Yo-kai Watch 3	Character and Yo-kai Designer	Nintendo 3DS	
2017	Layton's Mystery Journey: Katrielle and the Millionaires' Conspiracy	Character Designer	Nintendo 3DS, Mobile	
2017	Yo-kai Watch Busters 2	Character and Yo-kai Designer	Nintendo 3DS	
2018	Yo-kai Watch 4	Character and Yo-kai Designer	Nintendo Switch	
2019	Yo-kai Watch 4++	Character and Yo-kai Designer	Nintendo Switch, PlayStation 4	
2021	Megaton Musashi	Original Character Designer	Nintendo Switch, PlayStation 4, PlayStation 5	
2024	Inazuma Eleven: Victory Road	Original Character Designer	Nintendo Switch, PlayStation 4, PlayStation 5, PC, Mobile	

=== Anime and films ===
Year	Title	Role	Type	Ref.
2009	Professor Layton and the Eternal Diva	Original Character Design, Ending Illustrations	Theatrical Film	
2010	Inazuma Eleven: Saikyō Gundan Ogre Shūrai	Original Character Design	Theatrical Film	
2011	Danball Senki	Original Character Design	TV Series	
2011-2012	Mobile Suit Gundam AGE	Original Character Design	TV Series (49 eps)	
2011	Inazuma Eleven GO: Kyūkyoku no Kizuna Griffon	Original Character Design	Theatrical Film	
2012	Danball Senki W	Original Character Design	TV Series	
2012	Inazuma Eleven GO vs. Danbōru Senki W	Original Character Design	Theatrical Film	
2013	Mobile Suit Gundam AGE: Memory of Eden	Original Character Design	OVA	
2014	Inazuma Eleven: Chōjigen Dream Match	Original Character Design	Theatrical Film	
2014-2018	Yo-kai Watch	Original Character Design	TV Series (214 eps)	
2014	Yo-kai Watch: The Movie	Original Character Design	Theatrical Film	
2014-2015	Inazuma Eleven GO Galaxy	Original Character Design	TV Series (43 eps)	
2015	Yo-kai Watch: Enma Daioh to Itsutsu no Monogatari da Nyan!	Original Character Design, Original Yokai Design	Theatrical Film	
2016	Yo-kai Watch the Movie 2016	Yo-Kai and Original Character Designs	Theatrical Film (Live-Action/Animation)	
2016-2017	Inazuma Eleven: Outer Code	Original Character Design	ONA (6 eps)	
2017	Yo-kai Watch Shadowside (Movie)	Original Character Design, Yōkai Design	Theatrical Film	
2017-2018	Yo-kai Watch Shadowside (TV)	Original Character Design, Yōkai Design	TV Series (49 eps)	
2018	Inazuma Eleven: Ares no Tenbin	Original Character Design	TV Series (26 eps)	
2018-2019	Inazuma Eleven: Orion no Kokuin	Original Character Design	TV Series (49 eps)	
2018	Layton Mystery Tanteisha: Katori no Nazotoki File	Original Character Design	TV Series	
2019	Yo-kai Gakuen Y: N to no Sōgū	Original Character Design, Original Monster Design	TV Series	
2019	Yo-kai Watch! (TV 3)	Original Character Design, Original Yo-kai Design	TV Series	
2019	Yo-kai Watch! Jam: Yo-kai Gakuen Y - Neko wa Hero ni Nareru ka	Original Youkai & Character Design	Theatrical Film	
2021-2022	Megaton Musashi (Season 1)	Original Character Design	TV Series (13 eps)	
2021-2023	Yōkai Watch ♪ (TV 4)	Original Character Design, Original Yo-kai Design	TV Series	
2022-2023	Megaton Musashi (Season 2)	Original Character Design, Animation Supervisor (LEVEL-5 Character Art Team; eps 18–28)	TV Series (28 eps)	
2025	Inazuma Eleven: The Movie	Original Character Design	Theatrical Film (2-part compilation)	
