= Kotori Shigemoto =

Japanese fashion model, seiyū and child actor (born 1996)

- 重本 ことり
- Born: 5 October 1996 (age 29); Tokushima Prefecture, Japan
- Other names: Kotori (コトリ, ことり); Kocchan (こっちゃん)
- Occupations: Tarento; model; singer; voice actress
- Years active: 2006–2019
- Style: General fashion
- Height: 147.5 cm (4 ft 10.1 in)

Kotori Shigemoto (重本 ことり, Shigemoro Kotori; born 5 October 1996, in Tokushima Prefecture) is a Japanese tarento, fashion model, singer and voice actress. She is a former member and leader of Dream5. She is nicknamed Kotori (ことり). She is currently represented with Gold.

== Filmography ==
=== Variety ===
Year	Title	Network
2008	Tensai TV-kun Max	NHK-E
2010	Suiensaa	NHK-E

=== Radio ===
Year	Title	Network
2013	Kotori Shigemoto to Shizuke Umemoto no Tori Chiku Ume	Rainbow Town FM
2014	Kotori to Hata no Radio	Rainbow Town FM

=== TV dramas ===
Year	Title	Role	Network
2010	Musical 3	Hoshiko	Tokyo MX

=== Films ===
==== Dubbing ====
Year	Title	Role	Ref.
2017	Sing	Rabbit trio member	

=== Anime television ===
Year	Title	Role	Network	Ref.
2015	Yo-kai Watch	Usapyon	TV Tokyo	

=== Anime films ===
Year	Title	Role	Ref.
2015	Yo-kai Watch: Enma Daiō to Itsutsu no Monogatari da Nyan!	Usapyon	
2016	Yo-kai Watch: Soratobu Kujira to Double no Sekai no Daibōken da Nyan!	Usapyon	

=== Video games ===
Year	Title	Role	Ref.
2015	Yo-kai Watch Busters	Usapyon	
2016	Yo-kai Sangokushi	Usapyon	
2016	Yo-kai Watch 3	Usapyon	

=== Advertisements ===
Year	Title
2010	Fukusuke "Candy Legs"
2010	Kracie Foods "Fuwamoko"
2012	Ito-Yokado "Mother's Day"
2012	Ito-Yokado "Father's Day"
2012	Ito-Yokado "Tanabata"
2012	Ito-Yokado "Respect for the Aged Day"
2012	Ito-Yokado "Net de Check"
2012	Ito-Yokado "Labor Thanksgiving Day"
2014	Ito-Yokado "Happy Day"
2015	Yo-kai Watch Busters

=== Magazine serialisations ===
Year	Title
2010	Pichi Lemon
