= Yo-kai Watch: Soratobu Kujira to Double no Sekai no Daibōken da Nyan! =

2016 film by Shinji Ushiro, Takeshi Yokoi

- Poster

Japanese name
- Kanji: 映画 妖怪ウォッチ 空飛ぶクジラとダブル世界の大冒険だニャン!
Transcriptions
- Revised Hepburn: Eiga Yōkai Wotchi Soratobu Kujira to Daburu Sekai no Daibōken da Nyan!
- Directed by: Shigeharu Takahashi; Shinji Ushiro; Takeshi Yokoi (live action)
- Based on: Yo-kai Watch by Level-5
- Starring: Haruka Tomatsu/Ryōka Minamide; Kento Yamazaki; Takumi Saito
- Production company: OLM, Inc.
- Distributed by: Toho
- Release date: December 17, 2016
- Country: Japan
- Language: Japanese
- Box office: ¥3.26 billion ($29.97 million)

Yo-Kai Watch: Soratobu Kujira to Double no Sekai no Daiboken da Nyan!, (Note: Yo-kai Watch: Soratobu Kujira to Double no Sekai no Daibōken da Nyan! (映画 妖怪ウォッチ 空飛ぶクジラとダブル世界の大冒険だニャン!, Eiga Yōkai Wotchi Soratobu Kujira to Daburu Sekai no Daibōken da Nyan!; lit. 'Yo-kai Watch the Movie: The Great Adventure of the Flying Whale and the Double World, Meow!')) also known as Yo-kai Watch the Movie: A Whale of Two Worlds, is a 2016 Japanese animated and live action fantasy adventure film and the third film in the Yo-kai Watch film series, following the 2015 film Yo-kai Watch: Enma Daiō to Itsutsu no Monogatari da Nyan!. It was released in Japan by Toho on December 17, 2016. It was followed by Yo-kai Watch Shadowside: Oni-ō no Fukkatsu, which released on December 16, 2017.

== Plot ==
A giant whale flies over Sakura New Town (Springdale in most English-language releases of the series) and makes a whale noise that engulfs the city in a rainbow light, suddenly turning everything, including Keita "Keta" Amano (Nathan "Nate" Adams in most English-language releases of the series), his family, friends and Yo-kai into live-action. While trying to solve this weird mystery, it is later revealed to be the work of a Yo-kai that Keta decides to call "Koalanyan".

== Cast ==
=== Voice cast ===
- Haruka Tomatsu / Ryōka Minamide as Keita "Keta" Amano (Note: "Nathan "Nate" Adams" in most English-language releases of the series.)
- Tomokazu Seki as Whisper
- Etsuko Kozakura as Jibanyan and Bushinyan (Note: "Shogunyan" in most English-language releases of the series.)
- Yūki Kaji as Hovernyan
- Kotori Shigemoto as USApyon
- Aya Endō as Komasan and Komajiro
- Naoki Bandō as Robonyan F and Ultimate Robonyan
- Yuko Sasamoto as Orochi (Note: "Venoct" in most English-language releases of the series.) and Hikari Orochi (Note: "Illuminoct" in most English-language releases of the series.)
- Ryoko Nagata as Kyubi and Yami Kyubi (Note: "Darkyubi" in most English-language releases of the series.)

=== Live-action cast ===
- Minami Hamabe as Kanami Minami
- Kento Yamazaki as Lord Enma
- Takumi Saito as Nurarihyon
- Emi Takei as Sae Kinoshita
- Yuna Watanabe as Fumika "Fumi-chan" Kodama (Note: "Katie Forester" in most English-language releases of the series.)
- Yū Sawabe as Gorōta "Kuma" Kumashima (Note: "Barnaby "Bear" Bernstein" in most English-language releases of the series.)
- Raza Fukuda as Kanchi Imada (Note: "Edward "Eddie" Archer" in most English-language releases of the series.)
- Yoko Mitsuya as Keita's mother (Note: "Lily Adams" in most English-language releases of the series.)
- Shigeyuki Totsugi as Keita's father (Note: "Aaron Adams" in most English-language releases of the series.)
- Kenichi Endō as Jinmenken (Note: "Manjimutt" in most English-language releases of the series.)
- Kokoa Ishii (now Kokoa Amano) as Inaho Misora (Note: "Hailey Anne Thomas" in most English-language releases of the series.)

== Reception ==
On its opening weekend in Japan, the film was number-one in admissions, with 545,211, and number-two in gross, with ¥608 million (US$5.2 million). By January 11, the film earned ¥2 billion (US$17.43 million) and tops on number-one from the previous number-five.
