= Yo-kai Watch: Enma Daiō to Itsutsu no Monogatari da Nyan! =

2015 Japanese anime film directed by Shinji Ushiro Shigeharu Takahashi

- Poster

Japanese name
- Kanji: 映画 妖怪ウォッチ エンマ大王と5つの物語だニャン!
Transcriptions
- Revised Hepburn: Eiga Yōkai Wotchi Enma Daiō to Itsutsu no Monogatari da Nyan!
- Directed by: Shigeharu Takahashi; Shinji Ushiro
- Based on: Yo-kai Watch by Level-5
- Starring: Haruka Tomatsu; Tomokazu Seki; Etsuko Kozakura; Aoi Yūki; Kotori Shigemoto
- Production company: OLM, Inc.
- Distributed by: Toho
- Release date: December 19, 2015
- Running time: 94 minutes
- Country: Japan
- Language: Japanese

Yo-kai Watch: Enma Daiō to Itsutsu no Monogatari da Nyan! (Note: Yo-kai Watch: Enma Daiō to Itsutsu no Monogatari da Nyan! (映画 妖怪ウォッチ エンマ大王と5つの物語だニャン!, Eiga Yōkai Wotchi Enma Daiō to Itsutsu no Monogatari da Nyan!; lit. Yo-kai Watch the Movie: The Great King Enma and the Five Tales, Meow!)) is a 2015 Japanese animated fantasy adventure film directed by Shigeharu Takahashi and Shinji Ushiro. It is the second film in the Yo-kai Watch film series, following the 2014 film Yo-kai Watch: The Movie. It was released on December 19, 2015. It was followed by Yo-kai Watch: Soratobu Kujira to Double no Sekai no Daibōken da Nyan!, which released on December 17, 2016.

== Plot ==
Nate, Whisper, Jibanyan, Hailey, USApyon, and the many Yo-kai they have encountered embark on five adventures that all end up tied together in the end.

Episode 1: Nate turns into a Yo-kai (エピソード1：妖怪になったケータ, Episōdo 1: Yōkai ni Natta Kēta)
On his way to school, Nate unexpectedly and mysteriously falls into a manhole, dies and becomes the Yo-kai Fuu 2, so he becomes friends with a kid, who's the opposite of him, has trouble with his grades at school, and wishes to become a comic artist.
Episode 2: Jibanyan's Brilliant Strategy (エピソード2：ジバニャンの華麗なる作戦, Episōdo 2: Jibanyan no Kareinaru Sakusen)
Jibanyan, Shogunyan, and Robonyan F-Type are mysteriously flung 8 years into the future, where Jibanyan helps Amy (his former owner before becoming a Yo-kai) at her new job.
Episode 3: Komasan Returns Home (エピソード3：コマさん 家に帰る, Episōdo 3: Komasan Ie ni Kaeru)
Komasan and Komajiro return home and discover that their mother has had a third child named Komasaburō, But much to their shock, Komasaburō is a human infant.
Episode 4: USApyon's Merry Christmas (エピソード4：USAピョンのメリークリスマス, Episōdo 4: USApyon no Merī Kurisumasu)
USApyon is chosen to be Santa Claus this year by the Yo-kai Committee, so he and Hailey go throughout town to hand out gifts, but they come across a boy who does not want one, and instead, he wants his mom cured at the hospital.
Episode 5: Let's Go to the Yo-kai World (エピソード5：妖怪ワールドへ行こう, Episōdo 5: Yōkai Wārudo e Ikō)
Whisper, Jibanyan, USApyon, Komasan, and Hovernyan go to the Yo-kai World to fight Lord Enma, who has suddenly declared that humans and Yo-kai should never be friends. But is it really Lord Enma or the head of the Yo-kai council Zazel? As the journey of Whisper, Jibanyan, USApyon, Hovernyan and Komasan in Yo-kai World continues, they discovered that Zazel has sealed Lord Enma making the citizens of the Yo-kai World believe that Lord Enma got his disease in the human world to archived the promise of Ancient Enma, and now with Nate and Hailey joining the team, they must defeat the power hungry Chairman Zazel and his servants to save the Lord Enma, and Nate and Hailey must use the new Yo-kai Medal the mysterious boy gave Nate in the first episode to defeat him, which turns out to be the Yo-kai Medal of Lord Enma.

== Cast ==
- Haruka Tomatsu as Nathan "Nate" Adams (天野景太 / ケータ, Amano Keita / Keta) and Fuu 2
- Tomokazu Seki as Whisper
- Etsuko Kozakura as Jibanyan and Shogunyan
- Aoi Yūki as Hailey Anne Thomas (未空 イナホ, Misora Inaho)
- Kotori Shigemoto as Usapyon (USAピョン, USApyon)
- Aya Endō as Komasan and Komajiro
- Yūki Kaji as Hovernyan (フユニャン, Fuyunyan)
- Ryōhei Kimura as Lord Enma (エンマ大王, Enma Daiō)
- Takehito Koyasu as Zazel (ぬらりひょん, Nurarihyon)
- Hanamaru Hakata as Aristokat (猫きよ, Nekokiyo)
- Daikichi Hakata as Duke Doggy (犬まろ, Inumaro)
- Yuka Terasaki as Yuto Arima
- Hiroyuki Yoshino as Dethmetal
- Naoki Bandō as Robonyan F
- Masami Nagasawa as Amy
- Tetsuya Takeda as Giant Santa

== Box office ==
Enma Daiō to Itsutsu no Monogatari da Nyan! notably finished ahead of Star Wars: The Force Awakens on its opening weekend in terms of admissions, with 975,000 in its first two days. The Force Awakens grossed higher due to more expensive tickets, but only reached 800,000 tickets sold between December 19 and 20. The film was number-one in admissions again on its second weekend, with 450,000, and grossed ¥513 million (US$4.1 million), making it the fourth highest-grossing domestic film of 2016. The film grossed a total of ¥5.53 billion at the Japanese box office.

Overseas, the film grossed $7,967,212 in South Korea, France, and Spain, $47,502 in the United Arab Emirates, and $5,732 in Thailand.

== Other Releases ==
The film was localized into French on Summer 2019 as well as Latin American Spanish and Brazilian Portuguese on December 7, 2019.
