= Alicyn Packard =

American voice actress

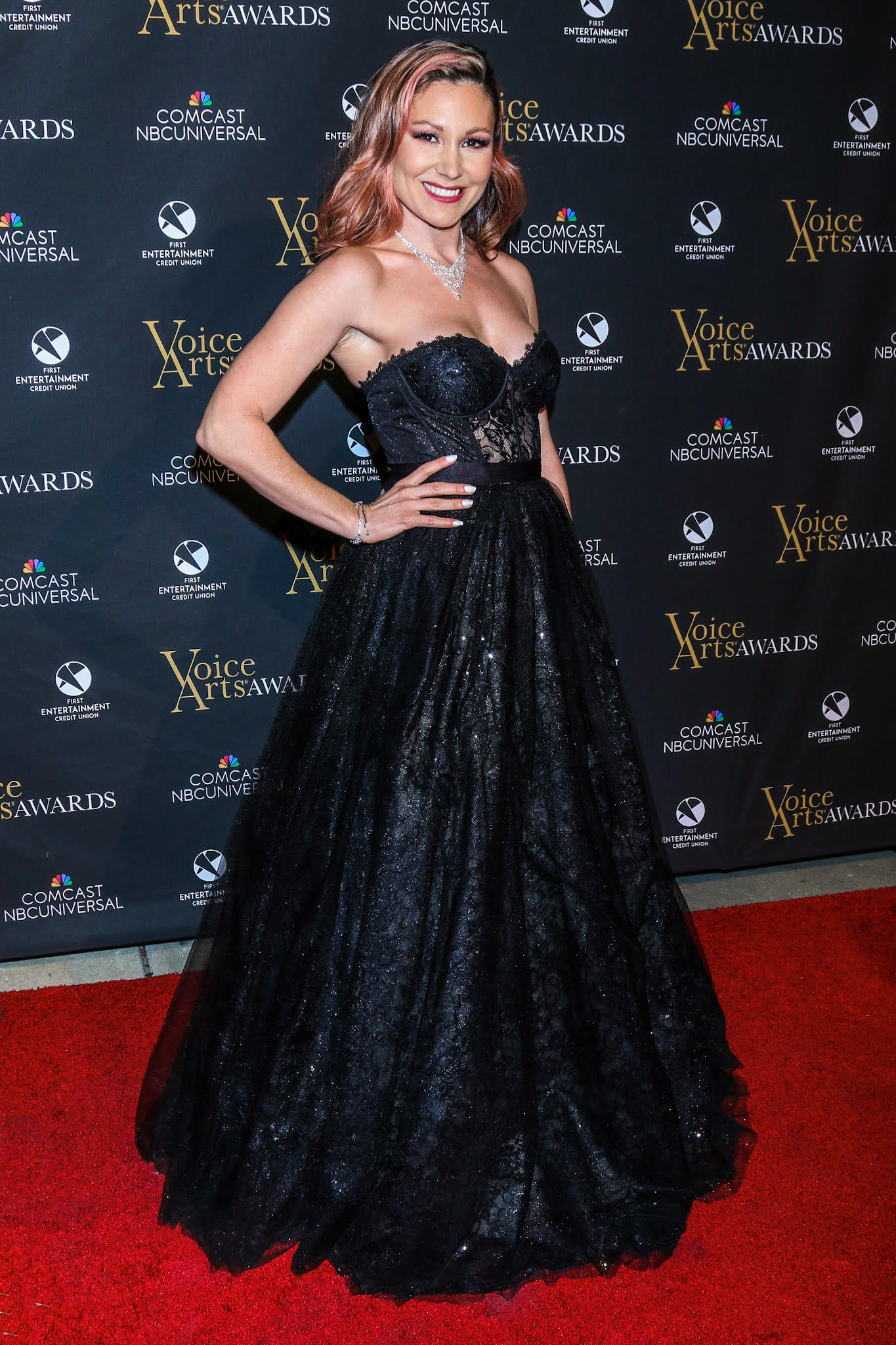
- Packard at the Voice Arts Awards in 2022
- Occupation: Voice actress
- Years active: 1997–present

Alicyn Packard is an American voice actress and retired stand-up comedian nominated for a 2014 Voice Arts Award. As of 2004–05, she provided the voice of Bulb from Disney Channel's Magnet-Tude. She also voices the characters Little Miss Sunshine, Little Miss Naughty, and Little Miss Whoops on the Cartoon Network animated series The Mr. Men Show. She also stars as Cadet Robyn on the Sprout network show Space Racers and as Alma on the Sprout network show The Extraordinary Adventures of Poppy Cat and wrote an episode of the show's second season. She plays Toodles on The Tom and Jerry Show, and Connor and Caitlin on Olivia. She also played Jibanyan on Yo-kai Watch.

Packard is the voice of the female blood elf in the video game World of Warcraft. She has also voiced Pericci in Star Ocean: The First Departure and the characters of Luce Valenci and Altyria Jono in Vandal Hearts: Flames of Judgment.

== Early life ==
Packard was raised in Hanson, Massachusetts, and began her career in nearby Boston. She later attended Emerson College, earning a Bachelor of Arts in Visual Media Arts with a concentration in New Media. At Emerson she was a DJ at WERS, the college's radio station which at the time was the nation's #1 college radio station in the nation (17). At WERS she created the electronic music program Revolutions which she co-hosted with the Grammy-nominated producer Morgan Page.

== Career ==
Packard's work at WERS brought her to the attention of local casting directors and she soon began her voice over career in local radio commercials and promos. She then worked at publisher Prentice-Hall as the voice of their e-learning textbooks. She moved to Los Angeles to complete her degree through Emerson College Los Angeles Program.

== Filmography ==
Animation

Title	Role	Note
Hungry Hungry Hippos	Janine, Little Old Lady	Film
Join the Soup	Broccoli	Film
Chop Kick Panda	Rex/Shiva	Film
Little Angels	Ariel, Dina	Series
An Okay Place to Eat	Little Delilah	Film
The Tom and Jerry Show	Toodles, Madame Beta, Matalyn, Coco, Ralphie, Nanny, Dove	Series
The Extraordinary Adventures of Poppy Cat	Alma (US dub, also co-writer)	Series
Pixie Hollow Games	Zephyr	Film
Olivia	Connor and Caitlin	Series
The Mr. Men Show	Little Miss Naughty, Little Miss Sunshine, Little Miss Whoops	Series
Rugrats	Josh	Series, Episode "The Two Angelicas"
It's Pony	Chris Mulrooney	Series

Anime

Title	Role	Note
Yo-kai Watch	Jibanyan, Lily Adams, Komajiro	Series
Re-Main	Taeko	Series
The Vampire Dies in No Time	Hinaichi	Series

Anime Film

Title	Role	Note
Yo-kai Watch: The Movie	Jibanyan, Buchinyan, Dame Dedtime, Shogunyan, Lily Adams	
Fruits Basket: Prelude	Kyoko's Mother	
Lupin the 3rd vs. Cat's Eye	Hitomi Kisugi	

Live-action

Title	Role	Note
Emotional Sugar Daddy	Sugar Baby	Short film Also writer and producer
Siri's First Day	Woman	Short film Also director, writer and producer
Keep Calm & Twerk On	Rachel	Short film Also director, writer and producer
Let's Ruin It with Babies	Big Bad Wolf Couple Female	Short film
Mammogram	Alicyn, Executive Producer, writer	Short film
World Full of Nothing	Taylor	Feature film
Alondra Smiles	Maggie	Feature film
Transgressions	Anchor (voice)	Short film
Three Card Stud	Audrey	Short film
Sonic Drone Home	Tails (voice)	Short film

Video games

Title	Role	Source
Lightning Returns: Final Fantasy XIII	Additional Voices	
Vandal Hearts: Flames of Judgment	Luca Valenci	
Eat Lead: The Return of Matt Hazard	Additional Voices	
Star Ocean: The First Departure	Perrici	
World of Warcraft: The Burning Crusade	Blood Elf Female	
Prince of Persia: Warrior Within	Additional Voices	
Metal Gear Solid V: The Phantom Pain	Additional Voices	
Marvel vs. Capcom: Infinite	Death	
Star Wars: Squadrons	X-Wing Pilot	
Ratchet & Clank: Rift Apart	Robot Pirates, Chef Tulio, Quantum Pirate, Additional Voices	
Neon White	Neon Red	
Transformers: Beyond Reality	Windblade	
Call of Duty: Modern Warfare II	Rozlin "Roze" Helms	
