= Move (Japanese band) =

Japanese musical group

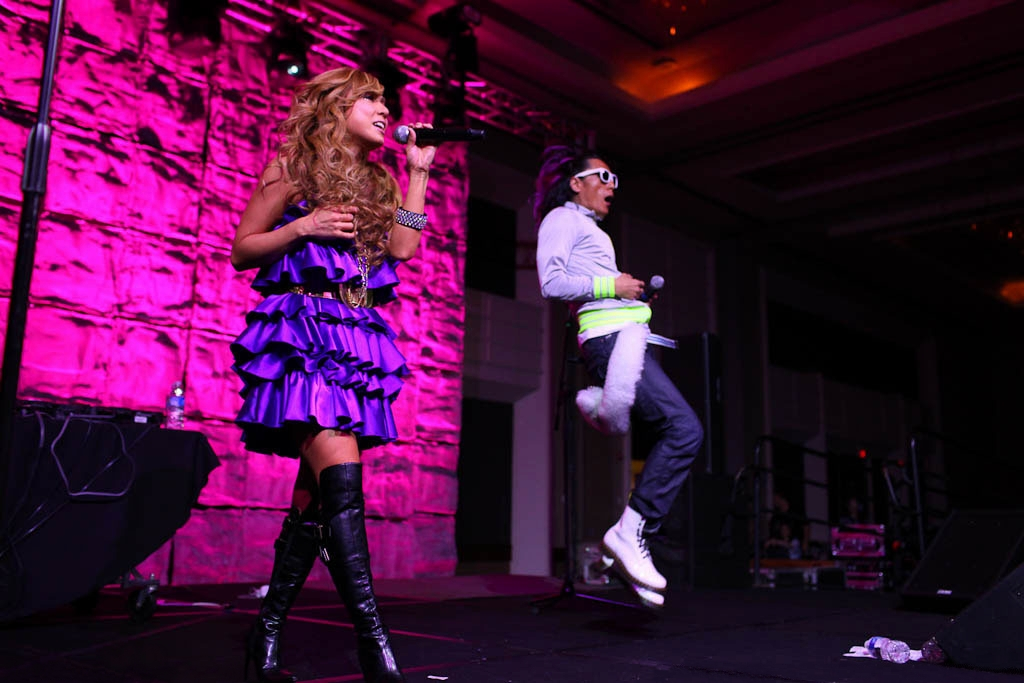
- Move performing at a concert at Anime Central 2009

Background information
- Also known as: M.O.V.E
- Origin: Japan
- Genres: Eurobeat; rock; hip-hop; synthpop; house; techno; trance; breakbeat; R&B; J-pop
- Years active: 1997–2013
- Label: Avex
- Past members: t-kimura (1997–2009) motsu yuri
- Website: www.electropica.com

Move (stylized as M.O.V.E or m.o.v.e, and previously as move) was a Japanese band. The band consisted of producer t-kimura (Takashi Kimura (木村 貴志, Kimura Takashi)), rapper motsu (Mototaka Segawa (瀬川 素公, Segawa Mototaka)) and singer yuri (Yuri Masuda (益田 祐里, Masuda Yuri)). t-kimura left the band in 2009.

== History ==
t-kimura formed the band move and by 1997 they released their first single "Rock It Down", but they achieved fame when their follow-up single, "Around the world" was used in the anime Initial D. In 2005, the band changed their name by adding abbreviation marks between letters and are currently still signed with Avex Group. The same year, the band traveled to the United States and performed at the Anime USA convention in Northern Virginia.

Move is perhaps best known for the unique style with which they blend rock, pop, hip-hop and many electronic genres into their music. Move are also well known for their contribution of opening and closing theme songs for the Initial D series and arcade games and in a scene of 3rd Stage the movie where Takumi is rescuing Natsuki from Miki's Celica. These include "Around the World", "Rage your Dream", "Break In2 the Nite", "Blazin' Beat", "Gamble Rumble", "Strike On", "Dogfight" (which was used as the intro for the fourth season of the anime Initial D), "Blast My Desire", "Nobody Reason" and "Noizy Tribe". The band also made a cameo in one of the Initial D 4th Stage episodes, "The Unmatched GTR!" and "Dogfight", where the band is briefly seen watching the race between God Foot and Keisuke. They also provided the opening theme for the anime series Ikki Tousen with their song "Drivin' Through the Night" as well as the ending theme for the anime Final Fantasy: Unlimited, "Romancing Train", and the ending credits for Koei's Dynasty Warriors 2 video game, "Can't Quit This!!!! Knock'em Out [SH Funk Mix]".

On December 2, 2008, t-kimura stated on Move's official web site that he would focus more on production, and less on performing. On April 10, 2009, Move performed with DJ T-Tashiro during an anime convention, Kamikazecon II, in Houston, Texas; the band announced that t-kimura would no longer perform on-stage.

On December 7, 2012, the band announced on their official website that, after a stint of 15 years, they would disband after their last live performance on March 16, 2013. Their final album, Best Moves, which was initially scheduled to be released on December 19, 2012, but was delayed because of the decision to disband; the album was released on February 29, 2013, and the album was renamed Best Moves ~and move goes on~. The concert "15th Anniversary Concert - Best m.o.v.e" was also postponed and renamed "m.o.v.e - The Last Show - Champagne Fight" for the same reason.

The concert was ultimately held on March 16, 2013, featuring 27 songs mainly from Best Moves ~and move goes on~ performed in front of an audience of 1,500. The show was recorded and then released on DVD on June 5, 2013.

In 2014, Avex released two unreleased songs:'Outsoar The Rainbow and Days. Outsoar The Rainbow, released digitally on May 16, 2014, on iTunes and other Japanese digital stores, was used as the opening for Initial D Final Stage as well as Initial D Arcade Stage 8 Infinity and Days was released on June 22, 2014, on iTunes and other Japanese digital stores and was used during the final episode of Initial D: Final Stage. Both tracks were also released on the compilation Initial D Final Best Collection.

== Discography ==
=== Albums ===
==== Studio albums ====
1. Electrock (June 24, 1998)
2. Worlds of the Mind (January 19, 2000)
3. Operation Overload 7 (February 15, 2001)
4. Synergy (February 27, 2002)
5. Decadance (September 10, 2003)
6. Deep Calm (January 28, 2004)
7. Boulder (January 26, 2005)
8. Grid (January 25, 2006)
9. Humanizer (January 21, 2009)
10. Dream Again (March 3, 2010)
11. Overtakers Spirit (May 25, 2011)
12. XII (March 7, 2012)

==== Other albums ====
1. anim.o.v.e 01 (August 18, 2009)
2. anim.o.v.e 02 (August 25, 2010)
3. anim.o.v.e 03 (September 7, 2011)

==== Remix albums ====
1. Remixers Play Move (March 23, 2000)
2. Super Eurobeat Presents Euro Movement (November 29, 2000)
3. Hyper Techno Mix Revolution I (May 30, 2001)
4. Hyper Techno Mix Revolution II(July 25, 2001)
5. Hyper Techno Mix Revolution III (October 11, 2001)
6. TropicanTrops (August 28, 2002)
7. Fast Forward: Future Breakbeatnix (May 26, 2004)

==== Compilation albums ====
- Move Super Tune: Best Selections (December 4, 2002)
- Rewind: Singles Collection+ (March 24, 2004)
- Move 10th Anniversary Mega Best (October 3, 2007)
- m.o.v.e B-Side Best (February 8, 2012)
- anim.o.v.e Best (February 22, 2012)
- Best moves. 〜and move goes on〜 (February 27, 2013)
- Move Best Complete Album (August 21, 2016)

==== Live albums ====
- Move 10 Years Anniversary Megalopolis Tour 2008 Live CD at Shibuya Club Quattro (March 19, 2008)

=== Singles ===
- "Rock It Down" (October 1, 1997)
- "Around the World" (January 7, 1998)
- "Over Drive" (March 18, 1998)
- "Rage Your Dream" (May 13, 1998)
- "Break in2 the Nite" (November 11, 1998)
- "Platinum" (June 30, 1999)
- "Blazin' Beat" (October 27, 1999)
- "Words of the Mind (Brandnew Journey)" (January 19, 2000)
- "Sweet Vibration" (July 19, 2000)
- "Gamble Rumble" (January 11, 2001)
- "Super Sonic Dance" (June 13, 2001)
- "Fly Me So High" (August 8, 2001)
- "Come Together" (December 19, 2001)
- "Romancing Train" (February 6, 2002)
- "Future Breeze" (June 26, 2002)
- "¡Wake Your Love!" (November 20, 2002)
- "Burning Dance (And Other Japanimation Songs)" (June 25, 2003)
- "Painless Pain" (September 3, 2003)
- "Blast My Desire" (January 7, 2004)
- "Noizy Tribe" ( January 26, 2005 )
- "Freaky Planet" (September 28, 2005)
- "Disco Time" (October 26, 2005)
- "Raimei (Out of Kontrol)" (雷鳴 ～out of kontrol～) (November 23, 2005)
- "Angel Eyes" (December 14, 2005)
- "Systematic Fantasy/Good Day Good Time" (June 20, 2007)
- "Speed Master" feat. 8-Ball (August 22, 2007)
- "Dive into Stream" (July 2, 2008)
- "Dogfight" ( June 28 2009 )
- "Fate Seeker" (January 13, 2010)
- "Overtakers" feat. Ryuichi Kawamura x Sugizo (May 11, 2011)
- "Outsoar The Rainbow" ( May 14, 2014 )
- "Days" ( 2014 )

==== iTunes Music Store US releases ====
- Dogfight — EP
1. "Dogfight (English Version)"
- Freaky Planet/Dogfight - Single
1. "Freaky Planet (English Version)"
2. "Dogfight (English Version)"
- Vagabond/Noizy Tribe/Les Rhythms Digitals Mix - EP
1. "Vagabond (English Version)"
2. "Noizy Tribe (English Version)"
3. "Les Rhythms Digitals Mix"
- The Longest Movie/Cafe Roza Mad Professor Mix - Single
1. "The Longest Movie"
2. "Cafe Roza (For Johnny & Mary) (Mad Professor Mix)"

=== DVD audio ===
- Move Super Tune: Best Selections (January 28, 2004)

=== DVD video ===
- Overdose Pop Star (November 1, 2000)
- Synergy Clips (March 13, 2002)
- Future Breeze+Various Works (June 26, 2002)
- ¡Wake Up Your! DVD (November 20, 2002)
- Painless Pain DVD (September 3, 2003)
- Blast My Desire (January 7, 2004)
- Dogfight (May 26, 2004)
- Move 10th Anniversary Giga Best (October 3, 2007)
- Move 10 Years Anniversary Megalopolis Tour 2008 Live DVD at Shibuya Club Quattro (March 19, 2008)
- m.o.v.e The Last Show ～Champagne Fight～ (June 5, 2013)

=== VHS video ===
- Electrize (October 7, 1998)
- Electrizm (November 1, 2000)
