= Jibanyan =

- Yo-kai Watch character
- Official artwork of Jibanyan
- First appearance: Yo-kai Watch; December 15, 2012
- First game: Yo-kai Watch (2013)
- Based on: Nekomata
- Designed by: Takuzō Nagano; Akihiro Hino
- Portrayed by: Japanese: Etsuko Kozakura; Takaya Kuroda (Shadowside); English; Alicyn Packard; Kira Buckland

In-universe information
- Species: Cat
- Gender: Male
- Family: Amy (former owner)
- Origin: Springdale

Jibanyan (ジバニャン), originally named Akamaru (アカマル) in Japan and known as Rudy in some English-language material, is a fictional cat yōkai from Level-5's multimedia franchise Yo-kai Watch. Designed by Takuzō Nagano, he is a red-and-white cat spirit with a chipped ear, two tails with blue ghost flames, a collar bell, and a yellow haramaki. He first appeared in the Yo-kai Watch manga in CoroCoro Comic in December 2012, before appearing in the first Yo-kai Watch video game in 2013. He later became one of the franchise's central characters and mascot figures, appearing across the anime, films, manga, video games, toys and promotional campaigns.

Scholars have discussed Jibanyan as a modern child-oriented recreation of the folkloric nekomata, focusing on how his design transforms older yōkai imagery into a kawaii mascot form. The character has also been analysed as the main character image of Yo-kai Watch's media-mix strategy, with academic commentary describing Level-5's effort to associate the franchise with Jibanyan in the public imagination.

== Concept and creation ==
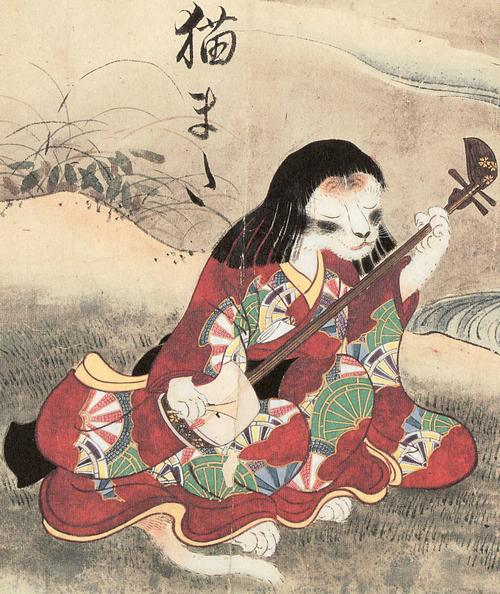
Traditional nekomata imagery, such as Edo-period yōkai illustrations, forms part of the folkloric background later reworked by Jibanyan.

Jibanyan was designed by Level-5 character designer Takuzō Nagano. Nagano based the character on the idea of a cat earthbound spirit with strong resentment. To express that idea, he gave Jibanyan a damaged ear, two tails, and flame-like markings on his face. The character's haramaki was intended to evoke a Shōwa-era feeling, while the final rounded design was chosen so that children of any gender would find him approachable. Nagano later stated that the character's final cuter appearance was influenced by Level-5 designer Miho Tanaka, who also worked on characters such as Komasan.

A 2016 Famitsu report on Nagano's CEDEC+KYUSHU lecture described Level-5's character-development process as a loose exchange between Akihiro Hino and Nagano rather than a rigid specification-driven process. According to the report, Hino would supply a short premise or setting, Nagano would return a visual proposal, and the character's personality and story would be refined through that back-and-forth. Nagano said that he approached those assignments by trying to propose ideas through the drawing itself, while Hino stated that the first rough illustration was important because it helped the character feel alive and suggested later story possibilities.

Jibanyan's backstory of dying after being hit by a truck was based on an incident from Hino's childhood, in which he saw a cat who had died after being struck by a vehicle. During the English localization process, some Level-5 staff considered changing the car-accident element, but Hino rejected the change because he considered it essential to the character's story. In a 2015 interview with Game Informer, Hino called Jibanyan his favorite Yo-kai Watch character.

He is voiced in Japanese by Etsuko Kozakura and by Alicyn Packard and Kira Buckland in English, all of whom adopt an emotional and childlike tone for the character. A 2018 Niconico News poll about Kozakura's roles ranked Jibanyan as the voice role most strongly associated with her.

== Characteristics ==
Jibanyan is depicted as the ghost of a domestic cat who was once owned by a girl named Amy (Note: Called Emi-chan in Japanese-language versions.) After being struck by a truck, he misunderstands his owner's reaction and believes that she was disappointed by how easily he died. He becomes an earthbound spirit and begins fighting trucks at an intersection to prove his strength. In the series, he eventually befriends Nate Adams (Note: known as Keita Amano in Japanese versions and in the Shogakukan Asia English manga distributed in Southeast Asia) and becomes one of the most recurring yōkai associated with him.

The character is commonly associated with chocolate bars, especially the fictional chocobō snack that he enjoys in the anime.

== Appearances ==
=== Main franchise ===
Jibanyan first appeared in the Yo-kai Watch manga in December 2012 prior to his appearance in the first Yo-kai Watch video game in July 2013. He appears throughout the Yo-kai Watch video games, television anime, manga, and theatrical films. In some later works, his forms and variants include Robonyan, a robotic version of Jibanyan from the future; an Anime News Network article described Robonyan's promotion in connection with the Japanese release of Terminator Genisys. In Yo-kai Watch Shadowside: Oni-ō no Fukkatsu, Jibanyan appears in a transformed form and is voiced by Takaya Kuroda.

Jibanyan also appears in the English-language edition of Noriyuki Konishi's Yo-kai Watch manga, published by Viz Media. The character was later made the focus of the English-language Scholastic chapter book The Misadventures of Jibanyan, published in 2016 as part of the Yo-kai Watch book line.

=== Crossovers and other games ===
Jibanyan has appeared in the context of several crossovers and spin-offs. Siliconera reported that he appeared as a mecha-like character in the Little Battlers eXperience series. He appeared with other Level-5 characters in a Japan-only collaboration with Everybody's Golf. Jibanyan and Lord Enma were also included in a Yo-kai Watch Puni Puni collaboration with Monster Strike.

Final Fantasy XIV has held multiple Yo-kai Watch crossover events that included Jibanyan and other yōkai. One such event occurred in 2020, with players able to obtain Yo-kai-themed minions and weapons.

== Merchandise and promotion ==
=== Toys and consumer products ===
Jibanyan has been used extensively in merchandising as a franchise mascot. Hasbro released Yo-kai Watch toys in North America during its partnership with Level-5. In Japan, Bandai released plastic model kits of Jibanyan and Robonyan.

Jibanyan's favourite food, the chocobō snack, is commercialized as a real confectionery product, with press coverage noting that the packaging reproduced the in-series design. Megahouse released a party game based on Jibanyan's chocolate-bar motif.

Jibanyan has appeared in Nintendo-related promotional items. Siliconera reported that GameStop pre-orders for the first Yo-kai Watch game included a Jibanyan pin, and that a limited-edition Nintendo 3DS XL featuring Jibanyan was released in Japan. A Jibanyan Nintendo 3DS theme was later made available through My Nintendo.

=== Public promotions ===
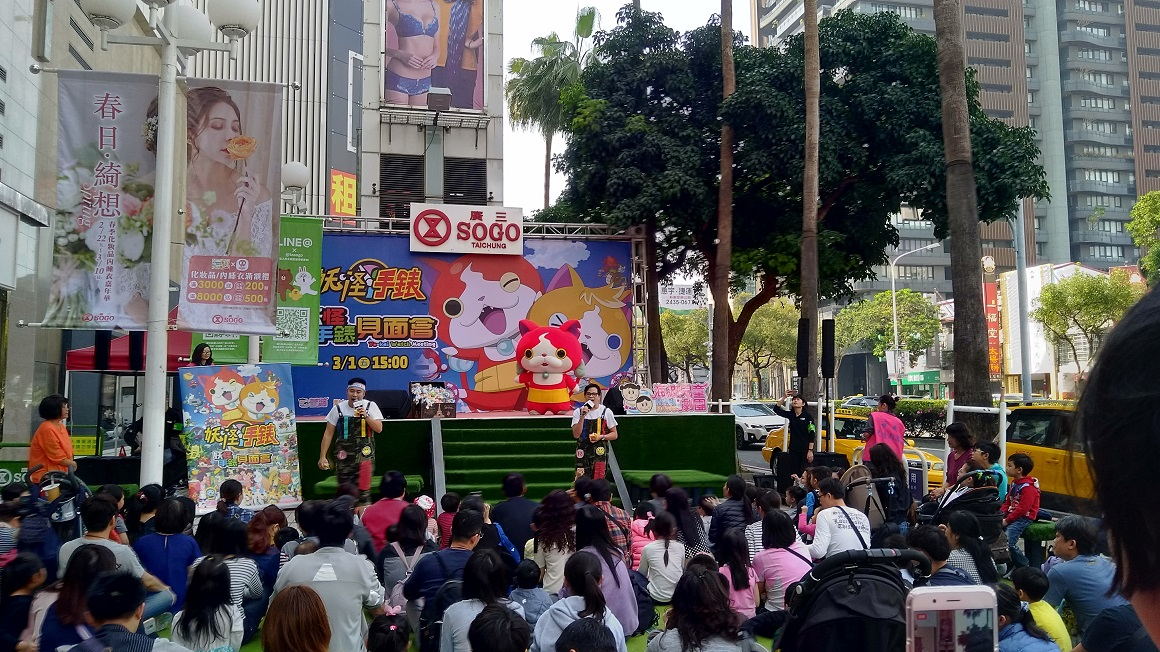
A promotional event featuring a mascot worker dressed in a Jibanyan costume

Jibanyan has been used in public-facing promotional campaigns. In 2014, Anime News Network reported that Jibanyan displaced Pikachu from the central position on the 2014 World Hobby Fair event artwork, reflecting Yo-kai Watch's sudden rise among Japanese children. SoraNews24 similarly framed the character's popularity in Japan as a direct challenge to Pikachu's position as the most visible child-oriented game mascot at the time.

In 2015, Hawaii Tourism Japan appointed Jibanyan as its children's goodwill ambassador. Famitsu reported the appointment and a follow-up visit in which Jibanyan met Hawaii governor David Ige. Siliconera described the campaign as assigning Jibanyan and other Yo-kai Watch characters to the Hawaiian islands, dressing them in tourist clothing and using them to introduce attractions such as hula dancing and volcanic national parks.

Jibanyan was also selected as one of several anime and manga characters used in a Tokyo 2020 Olympic campaign. ICv2 reported that Jibanyan appeared with characters including Goku, Luffy, Naruto, Sailor Moon, Shin-chan, and Astro Boy on official merchandise.

=== Transport and fast-food tie-ins ===
In Japan, Jibanyan and other Yo-kai Watch characters appeared on themed trains. For Yo-kai Watch: The Movie, railway promotions included Seibu Railway, JR West's Osaka Loop Line and other lines; JR Kyushu also ran a tie-in with a themed display at Kumamoto Station. In 2015, The Nikkei reported that Nankai Electric Railway operated a Yo-kai Watch wrapped train.

The character has also appeared in fast-food promotions. Crunchyroll reported a McDonald's Japan campaign involving Yo-kai Watch fry cases, while Hardcore Gamer reported Yo-kai Watch toys coming to McDonald's Happy Meals. Kotaku also covered later McDonald's tie-ins featuring Yo-kai Watch characters in restaurant uniforms.

== Reception and analysis ==
=== Popularity ===
Jibanyan is one of the most popular characters in the Yo-kai Watch franchise. Kotaku writer Brian Ashcraft described him as the franchise's most popular character in a 2015 article about the Yo-kai Watch Shadowside redesigns. Jibanyan consistently ranked among the highest voted characters in reader's polls conducted by media outlets such as Famitsu and Netorabo.

Several reviewers and websites described Jibanyan as cute or appealing. Eurogamer's Cassandra Khaw described him as adorable in a review of Yo-kai Watch. Destructoid's Chris Carter described Jibanyan's design positively while discussing Yo-kai Watch 3, and later praised an Indiana Jones-styled Jibanyan T variant. Darren Nakamura of Destructoid named Jibanyan one of the best new video game characters introduced in 2015. Nintendo Life's Morgan Sleeper praised the conversations players can have with Jibanyan while riding the train in Yo-kai Watch 2: Psychic Specters. GamesRadar+ listed Jibanyan among characters it wanted to see in Super Smash Bros. on Nintendo Switch.

=== Analysis ===
Balgimbayeva devotes a section of her Mutual Images Journal article to "Nekomata / Jibanyan". She explains that the folkloric nekomata is a dangerous cat yōkai identified by a double tail, and analyses Jibanyan as a contemporary child-friendly re-creation of that image. She contrasts the older dangerous cat folklore with Jibanyan's friendly, rounded and comic presentation, arguing that the character belongs to a wider process by which yōkai are remade for children's anime as cute rather than frightening figures. Balgimbayeva notes that Jibanyan's name and speech in Japanese make frequent use of nyan, a cat-like meowing sound. She describes this as an example of nekogo, or fictional cat language, used in anime, manga and games to make animal characters sound familiar and affectionate. Balgimbayeva identifies several design choices that make Jibanyan both recognisably yōkai-like and pet-like: his forked tails, blue onibi or ghost flames, damaged ear, blue collar and haramaki. She also reads his large eyes, oversized head and compact body as part of a kawaii design vocabulary comparable to other Japanese children's characters.

Koichi Noguchi (野口 光一, Noguchi Kōichi) of Nihon University argues that Yo-kai Watch succeeded by updating an older Japanese media-mix model for the 2010s, shifting the centre from film or literature to a game, anime, toy and manga strategy coordinated by Level-5 and Hino. In this analysis, Jibanyan functioned as the franchise's "star" character. Noguchi writes that Level-5 concentrated exposure on Jibanyan in the market and sought to make audiences associate Yo-kai Watch with him, creating a branding strategy in which "Yo-kai Watch = Jibanyan". He also notes that Jibanyan was visually emphasized in several early franchise materials: he was drawn larger than Keita (as Nate is known in Japanese versions) and Whisper in the manga's first installment, appeared alone in colour on the first game cover, stood at the centre of the first film's key visual, and was central in the anime ending dance sequence for "Yōkai Taisō Daiichi".

== See also ==
- Kirby (character)
- List of legendary creatures from Japan
