= Yo-kai Watch: The Movie =

2014 film by Shigeharu Takahashi

- Theatrical release poster

Japanese name
- Kanji: 映画 妖怪ウォッチ 誕生の秘密だニャン!
Transcriptions
- Revised Hepburn: Eiga Yōkai Wotchi Tanjō no Himitsu da Nyan!
- Directed by: Shigeharu Takahashi; Shinji Ushiro
- Screenplay by: Yoichi Kato
- Based on: Yo-kai Watch by Level-5
- Produced by: Kiyofumi Kajiwara; Makoto Wada; Izumi Furusawa; Yukari Hayakawa; Junichi Yanagihara
- Starring: Haruka Tomatsu; Tomokazu Seki; Etsuko Kozakura; Romi Park; Yuki Kaji
- Cinematography: Tatsumi Yukiwaki
- Edited by: Emi Onodera
- Music by: Kenichiro Saigo
- Production company: OLM, Inc.
- Distributed by: Toho
- Release date: December 20, 2014 (Japan)
- Running time: 97 minutes
- Country: Japan
- Language: Japanese
- Box office: $99.5 million

Yo-kai Watch: The Movie, released in Japan under the name Yo-kai Watch: Tanjō no Himitsu da Nyan!, (Note: Yo-kai Watch: Tanjō no Himitsu da Nyan! (映画 妖怪ウォッチ 誕生の秘密だニャン!, Eiga Yōkai Wotchi Tanjō no Himitsu da Nyan!; lit. Yo-kai Watch the Movie: Its the Secret of Birth, Meow!)) is a 2014 Japanese animated supernatural adventure film directed by Shigeharu Takahashi and Shinji Ushiro as part of the Yo-kai Watch franchise. The film was released on December 20, 2014, in Japan. It was followed by Enma Daiō to Itsutsu no Monogatari da Nyan!, released on December 19, 2015.

== Plot ==
The plot is the same as Yo-kai Watch 2, but with a few changes. One night, the evil Yo-kai duo Kin and Gin steal the Yo-kai Watch from Nathan "Nate" Adams to help their master Dame Dedtime prevent humans and Yo-kai from being friends. He then encounters the giant cat Yo-kai Meganyan, who tells him that Yo-kai are real. He and the crew head to Nate's grandmother Lucy Loo Adams, encounter a shadow and chase it, but to no avail. Meganyan returns, asking to pull out the cork in his body—the cork that suppresses his energy. Nate decides not to pull it out, and asks Jibanyan & Whisper to pull it out for him, but they refuse. Nate pulls it out, and he and the crew get covered in pink smoke. He finds help from the flyer cat Yo-kai Hovernyan - and uses a time stone to take Nate, Whisper, and Jibanyan back in time 60 years to when the Yo-kai Watch was first invented by Nate's own grandfather Nathaniel Adams while he was a kid. Dame Dedtime gets word of this and tries a plan to push the human world farther from the Yo-kai world. Together, the two boys battle against Dame Dedtime and her Wicked Yo-kai minions to save the past from her evil plans and recover Nate's Yo-kai Watch.

== Voice cast ==
Character	Japanese voice actor	English voice actor
Nathan "Nate" Adams (Keita "Keta" Amano)	Haruka Tomatsu	Johnny Yong Bosch
Whisper	Tomokazu Seki	Joey D'Auria
Jibanyan	Etsuko Kozakura	Alicyn Packard
Nathaniel Adams (Keizō Amano)	Romi Park	Meyer DeLeeuw
Hovernyan (Fuyunyan)	Yūki Kaji	Johnny Yong Bosch
Darknyan	Yūki Kaji	Brent Pendergrass
Meganyan (Dekanyan)	Yūki Kaji	Johnny Yong Bosch
Buchinyan	Etsuko Kozakura; Tomokazu Seki	Alicyn Packard; Joey D'Auria
Dame Dedtime (Tokio Ubaune)	Kataoka Ainosuke VI	Alicyn Packard
Kin and Gin	Vanilla Yamazaki; Mika Kanai	Melissa Hutchison; Jenn Wong
Lucy Loo Adams (Yukiko "Yukippe" Amano)	Hisako Kyōda (old); Haruka Shimazaki (young)	Jenn Wong
Robonyan	Naoki Bandō	Joey D'Auria
Shogunyan (Bushinyan)	Etsuko Kozakura	Alicyn Packard
Komasan	Aya Endō	Melissa Hutchison
Walkappa (Nogappa)	Masahito Yabe	Melissa Hutchison
Kyubi	Ryoko Nagata	Melissa Hutchison
Tattletell (Bakuroba)	Chie Sato	Melissa Hutchison
Blazion (Melamelion)	Yuko Sasamoto	Brent Pendergrass
Roughraff (Gurerurin)	Naoki Bandō	Brent Pendergrass
Noway (Murikabe)	Toru Nara	Brent Pendergrass
Manjimutt (Jinmenken)	Naoki Bandō	Paul Greenberg
Happierre (Honobono)	Masahito Yabe	Paul Greenberg
Dandoodle (Ikemenken)	Masahito Yabe	Paul Greenberg
Aaron Adams	Tōru Nara	Brent Pendergrass
Lily Adams	Ryoko Nagata	Alicyn Packard
Katie Forester (Fumika "Fumi-chan" Kodama)	Aya Endō	Melissa Hutchison
Edward "Eddie" Archer (Kanchi Imada)	Chie Sato	Brent Pendergrass
Barnaby "Bear" Bernstein (Gorota "Kuma" Kumashima)	Toru Nara	Paul Greenberg
Master Nyada	Ken Shimura	Joey D'Auria
Bronzlow (Do)	Masahito Yabe	Paul Greenberg

== Production ==
=== Music ===
The film's score was written Kenichiro Saigo.

- Opening Theme
  - "Gera Gera Po (Movie Version)" by King Cream Soda (Japan)
  - "Yo-kai Watch" by Basilio Fernando Ferreira (USA)
- Ending Theme
  - "Yo-kai Medley" by Yo-kai King Dream Soda & "Kuwagata to Kabutomushi" by King Cream Soda (Japan & USA)

== Release ==
=== Marketing ===
The film was announced in July 2014 on CoroCoro Comic. The first trailer was released in August and another trailer was released in October. A second film was announced in November. A story tie-in to the film was included in the video game Yo-kai Watch 2: Shinuchi, released on December 13. A manga of the film, illustrated by Noriyuki Konishi, was released in December, reaching the 30th place on the weekly chart with 32,561 copies sold on its first week, and selling 261,145 copies by its fifth week.

=== Home media ===
The Blu-ray and DVD were released on July 8, 2015, with both reaching the number-one place on the animation rankings, with 14,090 and 84,932 copies sold, respectively. By its 13th week, the DVD had sold 128,810 copies.

=== Western release ===
In September 2016, it was revealed via the Fathom Events website that the movie would be screened one time only on October 15, in select cinemas across the United States. Attendees received an exclusive Hovernyan medal at the screening. It was released on Netflix on December 1, 2016, in the United States before leaving the service on March 3, 2021. Its DVD was released on May 19, 2020, nearly four years after its theatrical release. The film was distributed by Wild Bunch in France, 01 Distribution In Italy, Buena Vista International in Turkey, Selecta Vision in Spain and Universal Pictures in some countries. Like the original anime series, in America, the theme song is replaced by a version by Swampy Marsh. Currently, Yo-Kai Watch: The Movie is available to buy or rent on Apple TV and Amazon Prime, with the promotional artwork on the Apple TV store page being the promotional artwork for the Yo-Kai Watch 2 game.

== Reception ==
=== Box office ===
The film set a new record for Toho for advance ticket sales, with 721,422 sold by October 26, reaching 840,000 by late November and more than 1 million by mid-December.

The film was number-one on its opening weekend, with ¥1.629 billion, a record for a Japanese film, previously held by Howl's Moving Castle. reached ¥5 billion by its third weekend, ¥6.54 billion by the fourth weekend and ¥7 billion by the sixth weekend. The film grossed ¥7.8 billion ($73,623,258) at the Japanese box office, where it was the highest-grossing domestic film of 2015.

Overseas, the film grossed ₩1.98 billion ($1.69 million) upon its opening in South Korea, and went on to gross ₩3,888,698,100 ($3,437,804) there. The film also grossed $257,343 in the United States and Canada, and $1,715,393 in France, the United Arab Emirates, and Thailand. The film grossed a total of $99.5 million worldwide.

=== Critical reception ===
Kotaku's Mike Fahey described the movie as keeping the humor of the TV show even in its highest dramatic stakes. Anime News Network reviewer James Beckett liked the humor, but was bothered by the pacing issues. He gave it a B grading.

Rotten Tomatoes gave the film an 80% with average rating of 6.6/10 based on 5 critics reviews.
