= Break Out / Yōkai Taisō Dai Ichi =

2014 single by Dream5

"Break Out" / "Yōkai Taisō Dai Ichi" (Break Out/ようかい体操第一) is the 12th single by the Japanese musical group Dream5, released on 23 April 2014.

"Yōkai Taisō Dai Ichi" ("Youkai Gymnastics Part 1") was an ending theme of the children's anime series Yokai Watch. Due to its unique choreography, the song became very popular among children and achieved viral status on YouTube where the animated video uploaded to the Level 5 official channel has been (as of November 2019) viewed more than 170 million times and spawned multiple dance covers.

The single debuted at number 8 on the Oricon single charts.
