= Dream5 =

Japanese musical group

Background information
- Origin: Japan
- Genre: J-pop
- Years active: 2009–2016
- Label: Avex Trax
- Past members: Kotori Shigemoto; Mikoto Hibi; Akira Takano; Yuuno Oohara; Momona Tamakawa
- Website: avex.jp/dream5/

Dream5 was a Japanese co-ed group. It was formed in 2009 and disbanded in 2016.

== History ==
In March 2009, over 1,500 singers participated in auditions on the Japanese TV show Tensai-TVkun Max to become members of a new group. 13 members reached the final audition, and five were selected to form the group. On November 4, they released their debut single, "I Don't Obey: Bokura no Pride" (I Don't Obey 〜僕らのプライド〜; I Don't Obey: Our Pride).

In March 2016, Momona Tamakawa announced that she would leave the group due to self-esteem issues. On December 26, the group announced they would disband at the end of 2016 and the beginning of 2017.

On March 4, 2019, Shigemoto retired from the entertainment industry.

On August 31, 2021, Ohara launched her official YouTube channel, "Yu-no-Tube". In her first video, she performed the "Yo-kai Exercise No. 1" dance for the first time in five years.

On November 16, 2025, Takano, Ōhara, and Hibi hosted a one-day limited event – Dream5 15th Limited Event 2025 – in Tokyo to commemorate the group's 15th anniversary.

== Members ==
- Akira Takano (Takano Akira) – Dancer
- Kotori Shigemoto (重本 ことり, Shigemoto Kotori) – Main vocalist
- Makoto Hibi (日比 美思, Hibi Makoto) – Main vocalist
- Momona Tamakawa (玉川 桃奈, Tamakawa Momona) – Dancer
- Yūno Ōhara (大原 優乃, Ōhara Yūno) – Dancer

== Discography ==
=== Albums ===
- Run to the Future (2010)
- Days (2011)
- Magokoro to You (2013)
- Dream5 5th Anniversary Single Collection (2015)
- Colors (2016)

=== Singles ===
- "I Don't Obey: Bokura no Pride" (I Don't Obey 〜僕らのプライド〜; I Don't Obey: Our Pride)."
- "Bokura no Natsu!!" (2010)
- "Koi no Dial 6700" (2011)
- "Like & Peace!" (2011)
- "Kirakira Everyday" (2012)
- "I-My-Me-Mine / EZ Do Dance" (2012)
- "Ready Go!!"/"Wake Me Up!" (2012)
- "Shekimeki" (2012)
- "Come On!"/"Doremifa-sorairo" (2013)
- "Hop! Step! Dance" (2013)
- "We are Dreamer" (2013)
- "Break Out / Youkai Taisou Daiichi" (2014)
- "Don-Don-Dooby-Zoo-Bah!" (2014)
- "Yo-kai Exercise No. 2" (2015)
