= Yo-kai Watch (manga) =

Japanese manga series by Noriyki Konishi

- North American English cover art of the series' first volume, showing Whisper (left) and Nathan "Nate" Adams (right)

妖怪ウォッチ (Yōkai Wotchi)
- Genre: Comedy, Fantasy
- Manga
- Written by: Noriyuki Konishi
- Published by: Shogakukan
- English publisher: NA: Viz Media; SEA: Shogakukan Asia
- Magazine: CoroCoro Comic
- Original run: December 15, 2012 – April 21, 2023
- Volumes: 23
- Anime television series
- Directed by: Shinji Ushiro
- Produced by: Yoshikazu Beniya (TV Tokyo), Kiyofumi Kajiwara
- Written by: Yoichi Kato
- Music by: Kenichiro Saigo
- Studio: OLM Team Inoue
- Licensed by: AUS: The Fusion Agency; EU: Viz Media Europe; NA: Dentsu USA (Season 1–2) SDI Media (Season 3); SEA: Medialink
- Original network: TXN (TV Tokyo), BS Japan, AT-X, Kids Station
- English network: AU: 9Go!; CA: Teletoon, Disney XD; IN: Cartoon Network, Toonami, Pogo; MY: Astro Ceria; PH: Cartoon Network, GMA; SEA: Toonami, Cartoon Network, Animax; SG: Okto; UK: Cartoon Network; US: Disney XD; ZA: Cartoon Network
- Original run: January 8, 2014 – March 30, 2018
- Episodes: 214
- Anime television series

Yo-kai Watch Shadowside
- Directed by: Fumiya Hōjō
- Written by: Yōichi Katō
- Music by: Kenichiro Saigo
- Studio: OLM Team Inoue
- Original network: TXN (TV Tokyo, TV Osaka)
- English network: SEA: Animax
- Original run: April 13, 2018 – March 29, 2019
- Episodes: 49
- Anime television series

Yo-kai Watch!
- Directed by: Ryousuke Senbo
- Written by: Yoichi Kato
- Music by: Kenichiro Saigo
- Studio: OLM Team Inoue; Magic Bus
- Original network: TXN (TV Tokyo), BS Japan, AT-X, Kids Station
- Original run: April 5, 2019 – December 20, 2019
- Episodes: 36
- Anime television series

Yo-kai Watch Jam - Yo-kai Academy Y: Close Encounters of the N Kind
- Directed by: Fumiya Hojo
- Written by: Akihiro Hino
- Music by: Kenichiro Saigo
- Studio: OLM Team Inoue
- Original network: TXN (TV Tokyo), BS Japan, AT-X, Kids Station
- English network: SEA: Animax
- Original run: December 27, 2019 – April 2, 2021
- Episodes: 64
- Anime television series

Yo-kai Watch♪
- Studio: OLM Team Inoue
- Original network: TXN (TV Tokyo), BS Japan, AT-X, Kids Station
- Original run: April 9, 2021 – March 31, 2023
- Episodes: 98
- Manga

Yo-kai Watch: Exciting Nyanderful Days
- Written by: Chikako Mori
- Published by: Shogakukan
- English publisher: SG: Shogakukan Asia
- Magazine: Pucchigumi (2014); Ciao (2014–)
- Original run: December 27, 2013 – present
- Volumes: 3
- Manga

4-Panel Yo-kai Watch: Geragera Manga Theater
- Written by: Coconas Rumba
- Published by: Shogakukan
- Magazine: CoroCoro ComicCoroCoro Comic SPECIAL
- Original run: August 30, 2014 – June 30, 2018
- Volumes: 3
- Manga

Yo-kai Watch: 4-Panel Pun-Club
- Written by: Santa Harukaze
- Published by: Shogakukan
- Magazine: CoroCoro Ichiban!
- Original run: April 2015 – present
- Volumes: 3
- Manga

Komasan 〜A Time for Fireworks and Miracles〜
- Written by: Shō Shibamoto
- Published by: Shogakukan
- Magazine: Hibana
- Original run: April 10, 2015 – September 10, 2015
- Volumes: 1
- Manga

Yo-kai Watch Busters
- Written by: Atsushi Ohba
- Published by: Shogakukan
- Magazine: CoroCoro Comic
- Original run: June 2015 – October 2015
- Volumes: 1
- Video games
- Yo-kai Watch (2013); Yo-kai Watch 2 (2014); Yo-kai Watch Blasters (2015); Yo-kai Watch Dance: Just Dance Special Version (2015); Yo-kai Sangokushi (2016); Yo-kai Watch 3 (2016); Yo-kai Watch Busters 2 (2017); Yo-kai Watch 4 (2019); Yo-kai Watch Jam: Yo-kai Academy Y – Yeah-Yeah School Life (2020)
- Anime films
- Yo-kai Watch: The Movie (2014); Yo-kai Watch: Enma Daiō to Itsutsu no Monogatari da Nyan! (2015); Yo-kai Watch: Soratobu Kujira to Double no Sekai no Daibōken da Nyan! (2016); Yo-kai Watch Shadowside: Oni-ō no Fukkatsu (2017); Yo-kai Watch: Forever Friends (2018)

Yo-kai Watch (妖怪ウォッチ, Yōkai Wotchi) is a manga series written and illustrated by Noriyuki Konishi, based on Level-5's franchise with the same name. The series primarily follows Nathan "Nate" Adams (Keita "Keta" Amano in the Japanese and Singapore English versions), who gets the titular Yo-kai Watch, which allows him to see Yo-kai, who are otherwise invisible to the human eye. The series was serialized by Shogakukan in its CoroCoro Comic magazine in Japan from December 2012 to April 2023. Viz Media publishes the series in North America under their Perfect Square imprint, whereas Shogakukan Asia publishes the series in English in Singapore and other Southeast Asian countries.

Multiple other manga series also based on the Yo-kai Watch franchise have been released, such as one focusing on Nate's love interest, Katie Forester (Fumika "Fumi-chan" Kodama in the Japanese and Singapore English versions), one based on the Yo-kai Watch Blasters video game, and one based on the Yo-kai Watch Jam: Yo-kai Academy Y: Encounter with N TV-series.

== Main characters ==
The VIZ translation uses Western character names, while the Singapore English translation uses Japanese character names.

Nathan "Nate" Adams / Keita "Keta" Amano (天野景太 / ケータ, Amano Keita / Keta) – An 11-year-old 5th grader who acquires a Yo-kai Watch while bug hunting in the Mount Wildwood forest. He's portrayed as a relatively average and straightforward character.

Whisper (ウィスパー, Wisupā) – Nate's self-appointed Yo-kai butler, who had been trapped in a gashapon machine for over nine-hundred years before being freed by Nate. In addition to giving Nate the Yo-kai Watch, he also explains the different characteristics and traits of Yo-kai when he and Nate run into them.

Jibanyan (ジバニャン, Jibanyan) – A cat-like Yo-kai, who Nate and Whisper met at an intersection in Nate's residence, Uptown Springdale. Prior to becoming a Yo-kai, Jibanyan was called Rudy (Akamaru) and was the pet cat of a girl named Amy (Emi). One day, Rudy was run over by a truck in the intersection where Jibanyan would later meet Nate and Whisper, causing him to become a Yo-kai.

== Background and release ==
Yo-kai Watch was written and illustrated by Noriyuki Konishi, a Japanese writer from Nagasaki Prefecture, previously known for his work on manga adaptations of series such as AM Driver and Mushiking: King of the Beetles. At the time of the Yo-kai Watch franchise's announcement, the manga, among other media, had already been planned in an attempt to make the franchise long-lasting.

The series first began serialization in CoroCoro Comic, published by Shogakukan, on December 15, 2012, over 5 months before the release of the first Yo-kai Watch video game. The series ended serialization on April 21, 2023.

In April 2015, Viz Media announced that it would start publishing Yo-kai Watch in English under their Perfect Square imprint, starting September later the same year, in conjunction with the release of other Yo-kai Watch media and merchandise. A trailer for the English series was uploaded to the official Yo-kai Watch YouTube channel later on October 5. As a teaser to the series' release, Viz Media distributed samples of the series' first volume through some retailers as a part of Halloween ComicFest 2015.

In North America, the first two volumes of the series were released on November 2, after pre-orders were made available on October 27.

There is a separate English translation in Singapore, published by Shogakukan Asia.

== Volumes ==
Currently the ISBNs reflect the versions released in the US.

No.	Original release date	Original ISBN	English release date	English ISBN
1	June 28, 2013	978-4-09-141655-1	Singapore: July 1, 2015; US: November 3, 2015	978-1-4215-8251-1
2	December 27, 2013	978-4-09-140018-5	Singapore: September 23, 2015; US: November 3, 2015	978-1-4215-8252-8
3	March 25, 2014	978-4-09-141709-1	Singapore: November 27, 2015; US: January 5, 2016	978-1-4215-8273-3
4	July 25, 2014	978-4-09-141793-0	US: March 1, 2016; Singapore: March 25, 2016	978-1-4215-8274-0
5	October 28, 2014	978-4-09-141817-3	US: May 3, 2016; Singapore: June 2016	978-1-4215-8275-7
6	February 27, 2015	978-4-09-141876-0	Singapore: End of September 2016; US: December 6, 2016	978-1-4215-9217-6
7	June 26, 2015	978-4-09-142006-0	US: March 7, 2017; Singapore: April 2017	978-1-4215-9218-3
8	September 28, 2015	978-4-09-142102-9	Singapore: November 2017; US: January 2, 2018	978-1-4215-9691-4
9	February 26, 2016	978-4-09-142119-7	Singapore: May 2018; US: July 3, 2018	978-1-4215-9753-9
10	June 24, 2016	978-4-09-142175-3	January 8, 2019 (US only for this and further volumes)	978-1-4215-9754-6
11	August 5, 2016	978-4-09-159232-3	May 14, 2019	978-1-4215-9755-3
12	April 28, 2017	978-4-09-142389-4	September 12, 2019	978-1-9747-0310-4
13	September 28, 2017	978-4-09-142530-0	January 14, 2020	978-1-9747-0311-1
14	November 28, 2017	978-4-09-142637-6	May 12, 2020	978-1-9747-0312-8
15	May 28, 2018	978-4-09-142710-6	September 8, 2020	978-1-9747-0608-2
16	July 26, 2019	978-4-09-143046-5	January 12, 2021	978-1-9747-1858-0
17	October 28, 2019	978-4-09-143109-7	May 11, 2021	978-1-9747-1881-8
18	July 28, 2020	978-4-09-143209-4	September 14, 2021	978-1-9747-1485-8
19	August 27, 2021	978-4-09-143339-8	August 9, 2022	978-1-9747-3210-4
20	December 27, 2021	978-4-09-143367-1	January 10, 2023	978-1-9747-3424-5
21	April 27, 2022	978-4-09-143390-9	May 9, 2023	978-1-9747-3697-3
22	December 27, 2022	978-4-09-143575-0	January 9, 2024	978-1-9747-4300-1
23	May 26, 2023	978-4-09-143615-3	June 18, 2024	978-1-9747-4571-5

There was a special edition of Volume 1, released with a Yo-kai Medal, in Singapore.

Kazé publishes it in Spain and France.

== Reception and sales ==
Rebecca Silverman of Anime News Network rated the series' first two English volumes a B−, praising the book's "comfortable narrative patterns for kids [and] nice humor", while criticizing its localization for being "highly formulaic". Silverman was also positive towards the series' art, rating it a B and calling it "deceptively simple and very expressive". Silverman also noted that Konishi would frequently illustrate "grotesquely bulging eyeballs", among other "icky imagery", which she felt made it "thrillingly disgusting" for child readers.

The series won the award for Best Children's Manga at both the 38th Kodansha Manga Awards and the 60th Shogakukan Manga Awards.

Throughout 2014, Yo-kai Watch sold over 2.58 million copies in Japan across its different volumes, ranking it as the 20th best-selling manga series on Oricon's Annual Book Ranking that year.
