= Yo-kai Watch 3 =

2016 role-playing video game

- North American cover art
- Developer: Level-5
- Publishers: JP: Level-5; WW: Nintendo
- Director: Ken Motomura
- Producer: Akihiro Hino (Hinozall)
- Designer: Tatsuya Shinkai
- Programmers: Yuji Mori; Tetsuo Mori
- Artists: Takuzo Nagano; Miho Tanaka
- Writers: Akihiro Hino; Keitaro Sato
- Composer: Kenichiro Saigo
- Series: Yo-kai Watch
- Platform: Nintendo 3DS
- Release: JP: July 16, 2016; EU: December 7, 2018; NA: February 8, 2019
- Genres: Role-playing, Tactical role-playing
- Modes: Single-player, multiplayer

Yo-kai Watch 3 is a role-playing video game developed by Level-5 for the Nintendo 3DS and the third installment in the main series of Yo-kai Watch video games. It was initially released in two versions, Sushi and Tempura, in Japan in July 2016. A third version of the game, Sukiyaki, was released in Japan in December 2016, adding new content and enhancements on the original versions. An English version based on Sukiyaki published by Nintendo was released in PAL regions in December 2018 and in North America two months later.

The game follows the interconnected stories of dual protagonists Nathan "Nate" Adams, an 11-year-old boy who recently moved to the fictitious city of BBQ in the Southern United States, and Hailey Anne Thomas, a self-styled otaku "outcast" who opens a detective agency in the upstate city of Springdale and replaces Nate's love interest Katie Forester as the female protagonist. They both possess the Yo-kai Watches Model U Prototypes, allowing them to see, befriend and summon Yo-kai.

The game received generally positive reviews from critics, but was considered a commercial failure outside Japan. It would be, for over seven years, the last game in the series to be released internationally until Yo-Kai Watch 2: Haunted Domain was confirmed to be in development in September, 2026, and planned for an international release.

== Gameplay ==
Yo-kai Watch 3 retains the series' core gameplay elements, combining exploration, puzzle-solving, and turn-based combat. However, it introduces new gameplay mechanics, most notably having a grid-based combat system, the Tactics Board, rather than rotating Yo-kai using a wheel. It also features two distinct regions: Springdale, returning from previous games, and BBQ, an American-inspired town, each with various areas to explore.

=== Minigame ===
In Yo-kai Watch 3, the Zombie Night event takes place in St. Peanutsburg on random nights when a bell rings, causing zombies to rise from their graves and roam the town. The player controls Nate, who wields a hammer to defeat zombies and must reach and ring the Mourning Bell, which ends the curse and wakes the town. Once the bell is rung, players may trigger a second wave of stronger zombies, which offers greater rewards but is more difficult.

== Plot ==
The plot of Yo-kai Watch 3 initially follows the dual protagonists Nathan "Nate" Adams and Hailey Anne Thomas, whose stories eventually intertwine into one narrative. The game's humor leans heavily into parody, often poking fun at pop culture, science fiction, and classic tropes of mystery-solving.

Nate's story follows him as he moves from the city of Springdale to the southern American town of BBQ for his father's job and encounters 'Merican Yo-kai. There, he meets Buck Hazeltine, a boy who can see Yo-kai because of the UFO Stone he wears on his necklace, and they investigate local mysteries as FBY agents Blunder and Folly investigate rumors of a UFO in town.

Hailey's story follows her as she befriends Usapyon and they open the "Hapyon Detective Agency", a detective agency in Springdale, to solve mysteries and requests from Yo-kai and humans.

After their stories converge, it is revealed that the paranormal activities in both BBQ and Springdale are being orchestrated by the Ghoulfather, a powerful Boss Yo-kai styled after classic cinematic mob bosses. The Ghoulfather seeks to use the "UFO Stone" and the power of "Hazeltine Mansion" to rewrite reality into a world he controls. Nate, Hailey, and their combined teams of Yo-kai must travel between dimensions and eventually face the Ghoulfather in a final battle. Upon his defeat, the world is restored to normal and the protagonists' bond solidifies a new era of cooperation between the Yo-kai of Japan and the United States, at the end of the game, Nate's family moves back to Springdale.

== Development ==
Level-5 announced details for Yo-kai Watch 3 at a press conference in April 2015. The developers promised at least three large-scale feature updates would follow the release of the game.

Details for the third version of the game, Sukiyaki, were announced in October 2016. Sukiyaki included a separate multiplayer mode, Blasters T, based on the spinoff game Yo-kai Watch Busters 2: Secret of the Legendary Treasure Bambalaya, the ability to unlock "Deva Yo-kai" by linking all three versions together, and a sidequest based on the third movie, Yo-kai Watch: Soratobu Kujira to Double no Sekai no Daibōken da Nyan!. The Blasters T mode was added to Sushi and Tempura as the first major update, after the release of Sukiyaki.

Version 3.0 of Yo-kai Watch 3 was launched in Spring 2017, adding new quests, locations, dungeons, and Yo-kai. The next major feature update, version 4.0, was launched in Summer 2017.

=== Localization ===
The original Japanese release of Yo-kai Watch 3 involves a culture shift from the Japanese setting of Springdale to the American setting of the United States. The Western release instead frames the shift as a move from a Japanese interpretation of an average American city to a representation of the Southern United States. The cultural contrasts that Nate experiences are changed to highlight the cultural clash between what he is used to in upstate America and the culture of a city in the American South. To make the localization feel more "realistic", the nature of this cultural clash is often played for comedy. For example, an early plot element in the original Japanese release involved Nate not understanding the residents because he does not know English, with minimal straight comedy. In the localized release, he now fails to understand their thick southern drawl, turning into a full-on comedic premise.

According to prerelease coverage and marketing, the localization turned America into the fictitious country of BBQ, with Nate moving to the city of St. Peanutsburg within BBQ. However, in-game dialogue makes it clear that this is not the case and that BBQ is within the same state, as it makes frequent reference to Springdale being "upstate" and Nate and his family having moved across the state rather than overseas.

The International versions of Yo-kai Watch 3 are a modified version of Yo-kai Watch 3: Sukiyaki.

== Marketing ==
The covers for the initial Sushi and Tempura versions were released alongside the announcement that the game would be split into two versions in April 2016. The cover for Sushi features the Koma Knomads, 'Merican Yo-kai based on Komasan and Komajiro; the cover for Tempura has Tomnyan, a 'Merican Yo-kai based on Jibanyan. Sushi & Tempura sold 632,135 copies combined during its release week, less than half the combined first-week sales of Yo-kai Watch 2.

Sushi and Tempura were bundled together as the Sushi/Tempura Busters T [Treasure] Pack (スシ/テンプラ バスターズTパック), released on December 15, 2016, alongside Sukiyaki. Sukiyaki sold 337,979 copies during its release week; the Sushi/Tempura Busters bundle sold 17,709.

== Reception ==
Reception

Aggregate scores
Aggregator	Score
Metacritic	80/100
OpenCritic	81% recommend

Review scores
Publication	Score
Famitsu	37/40
GameSpot	6/10
Nintendo Life	9/10

Yo-kai Watch 3 received "generally favorable" reviews from critics, according to the review aggregation website Metacritic. Yo-kai Watch 3 was positively reviewed in Famitsu, scoring 37/40 for both the Sushi & Tempura versions; the Sukiyaki version received the same score.

In the United States, GameSpot scored the game 6/10, calling it "a fun time" and "a cheerful, wacky playground where Pokémon-like creatures happen to live." Nintendo Life was significantly more enthusiastic, scoring the game at 9/10 and declaring it "a triumphant last hurrah for one of the [3DS] platform's most beloved series." Overall, the game was rated 80/100 on Metacritic.

Despite positive reviews, the game sold less than its two predecessors in Japan, selling 2 million copies overall. The game was also a commercial failure in the United States. In the years since its release, Yo-kai Watch 3 has become one of the 3DS's most expensive games.

== Sequel ==
The fourth game in the main series, Yo-kai Watch 4, was released for the Nintendo Switch in Japan on June 20, 2019. A western release was confirmed at a panel held during the Anime Expo in July 2019, however, in October 2020, Level 5's North American operations shut down, putting into question the chances for the game to be released in North America. However, with Level 5 returning to the international market in February 2023, the status of the localization remains uncertain.
