= Yo-kai Watch =

Japanese multimedia franchise

- Created by: Akihiro Hino
- Original work: Yo-kai Watch (2013) (Note: The game's release was preceded by the 2012 manga series)
- Owner: Level-5
- Years: 2013–present

Print publications
- Book: The Yo-kai Watch Guide (2014)
- Comics: Manga series (2012–2023)

Films and television
- Films: Yo-kai Watch: The Movie (2014); Yo-kai Watch: Enma Daiō to Itsutsu no Monogatari da Nyan! (2015); Yo-kai Watch: Soratobu Kujira to Double no Sekai no Daibōken da Nyan! (2016); Yo-kai Watch Shadowside: Oni-ō no Fukkatsu (2017); Yo-kai Watch: Forever Friends (2018); Yo-kai Watch Jam the Movie: Yo-Kai Academy Y – Can a Cat be a Hero? (2019); Yo-kai Watch♪ the Movie: How Nate and I Met Nyan!♪ M-Me Too~♪♪ (2021); Yo-kai Watch♪: Jibanyan vs. Komasan - The Big Amazing Battle, Nyan (2023)
- Animated series: Yo-kai Watch (2014–2018); Yo-kai Watch Shadowside (2018–2019); Yo-kai Watch! (2019); Yo-kai Watch Jam - Yo-kai Academy Y: Close Encounters of the N Kind (2019–2021); Yo-kai Watch♪ (2021–2023)

Games
- Video games: Video games

Miscellaneous
- Toy: Merchandise

Official website
- Official website

Yo-kai Watch (Note: Japanese: 妖怪ウォッチ, Hepburn: Yōkai Wotchi) (Note: Trademarked in Japan as Youkai Watch and Yokai Watch) is a role-playing video game series and associated media franchise created and developed by Level-5. The first video game in the main series was released for the Nintendo 3DS in 2013. Three main sequels and several spin-offs, on both Nintendo consoles and mobile platforms, have been released, with Nintendo handling international releases until 2019. In December 2019, the franchise expanded to PlayStation with the release of Yo-kai Watch 4++. An associated toy line is produced by Bandai for the Japanese market, while Hasbro formerly sold the toys under license in the Americas and Europe.

Six manga adaptations have also been produced; one, a series that began serialization in Shogakukan's CoroCoro Comic from December 2012 to April 2023, was an award winner. An anime television series produced by OLM, Inc. aired in Japan from January 8, 2014, to March 30, 2018, and was a ratings success, boosting the franchise in popularity, and began airing in North America from September 2015. An animated film, Yo-kai Watch: The Movie, was released on December 20, 2014, with seven more films being produced since then. As of 2022, the game series has sold over 17 million copies worldwide.

While the franchise is popular in Japan and Europe, it failed to meet Level-5's expectations in North America. Nonetheless, the franchise's North American launch was successful, with the original 3DS game selling 400,000 units, backed by the toys and the broadcast of the English dub on Disney XD in the United States. However, interest in the Yo-kai Watch franchise has since steadily declined. The franchise generated $2 billion in retail sales, making it one of the highest grossing media franchises of all time.

On September 9, 2026, a remake of Yo-kai Watch 2, Yo-kai Watch 2: Haunted Domain, was announced during a Nintendo Direct; it is set to be the first new game release in the series since Yo-kai Watch Jam: Yo-kai Academy Y in 2020. It is also set to be the first entry released outside Asia since Yo-kai Watch 3, which was released in Europe in 2018 and in North America in 2019.

== Concept and plot ==
The franchise was first conceived as a Doraemon IP, something that could last over a long period of time. Akihiro Hino, CEO of Level-5, researched extensively what makes a franchise long-lasting, and came up with Yo-kai Watch.

Yo-kai Watch revolves around befriending Yo-kai that are haunting the city, which are based on traditional yōkai, but often with clever twists. If one befriends a Yo-kai, they get their Yo-kai Medal, an object that allows one to summon Yo-kai. With these, they can summon Yo-kai to either fight other Yo-kai, befriend others, or solve everyday tasks.

The basic plot of most media is that the main character, either Nathan "Nate" Adams or Katie Forester, obtains a Yo-kai Watch through Whisper, a butler Yo-kai. They then befriend Jibanyan, a nekomata Yo-kai who haunts an intersection because he thinks his owner from when he was alive named Amy called him lame for getting hit by a truck. During the series's run, other Yo-kai were introduced.

=== Characters ===
In most English-language Yo-kai Watch media, the character names are changed to new names. In the Shogakukan Asia English manga published in Singapore and other Southeast Asian countries, the original Japanese names are used.

Nathan "Nate" Adams / Keita "Keta" Amano (天野景太 / ケータ, Amano Keita / Kēta)
Voiced by: Haruka Tomatsu (Japanese); Johnny Yong Bosch (Season 1-2), Griffin Burns (Season 3), Meyer DeLeeuw (Blasters) (English)
Nathan "Nate" Adams is a 11-year-old fifth-grade student who is average at most things, which bothers him. However, he is active, cheerful and well-liked by his classmates and he has a crush on Katie. While bug hunting in the forest to find a rare bug to impress Katie, he discovers a capsule machine under a sacred tree, from which he frees Whisper and is given the Yo-kai Watch, which allows him to see and befriend Yo-kai and obtaining Yo-kai Medals to summon them into battle against mischievous Yo-kai. In the shōjo manga series, he does not possess a Yo-kai Watch and is unaware of the existence of Yo-kai.
Katie Forester / Fumika "Fumi-chan" Kodama (木霊文花 / フミちゃん, Kodama Fumika / Fumi-chan)
Voiced by: Aya Endō (Japanese); Melissa Hutchison (Season 1-2), Reba Buhr (Season 3) (English)
Katie Forester is a 11-year-old fifth-grade student who is Nate's childhood crush and classmate, she is very popular and highly intelligent, but afraid of failing to meet her mother's standards. She is often admired by her fellow male students, particularly Nate. In contrast to Nate's Yo-kai Watch, Katie's Yo-kai Watch is shaped like a pocket watch with a floral design, which she wears as a pendant around her neck. In the shōnen manga series and the anime (except for a dream Whisper has in episode 67), she does not possess a Yo-kai Watch and is unaware of the presence of Yo-kai. Katie is also featured in the Mini Corners, where Kyubi tries to (unsuccessfully) win over her heart.
Barnaby "Bear" Bernstein / Gorōta "Kuma" Kumashima (熊島五郎太 / クマ, Kumashima Gorōta / Kuma)
Voiced by: Tōru Nara (Japanese); Paul Greenberg (Season 1-2), Tony Azzolino (Season 3) (English)
Barnaby "Bear" Bernstein is Nate's friend and classmate who appears intimidating, but in reality is friendly and sensitive. He has a younger sister named Bearmie who lives in America and has a boyfriend (uncle in English version) named Arnold.
Edward "Eddie" Archer / Kanchi Imada (今田干治 / カンチ, Imada Kanchi)
Voiced by: Chie Satō (Japanese); Brent Pendergrass (Season 1-2), Bryce Papenbrook (Season 3) (English)
Edward "Eddie" Archer is Nate's friend and classmate who often hangs out with Bear and wears headphones. He is the son of wealthy designers, and does not believe in the paranormal and is skilled with technology.
Hailey Anne Thomas / Inaho Misora (未空イナホ, Misora Inaho)
Voiced by: Aoi Yūki (Japanese); Erika Harlacher (English)
Hailey Anne Thomas is a self-proclaimed otaku girl with the same age as Nate in the school who is introduced in Yo-kai Watch 3, shōnen and shōjo manga series and the anime series's second season. Hailey Anne loves science fiction and outer space. After Usapyon tricks her into buying the Yo-kai Watch Model U Prototype, she agrees to help him build a rocket to make his former owner Dr. Hughly's dreams come true. Afterwards, they start a detective agency to investigate Yo-kai "crimes" in the city of Sparkopolis.
Summer Adams / Natsume Amano (天野ナツメ, Amano Natsume)
Voiced by: Mone Kamishiraishi (movie), Aoi Yūki (anime)
Summer Adams is a 13-year-old junior high schooler, Nate and Katie's daughter and Tate's older sister. She nearly drowned in a river when she was young, but was saved by a Yo-kai named Seiryuu. In Yo-kai Watch Shadowside: Oni-ō no Fukkatsu, she is chosen by the Yo-kai Watch Arcane, allowing her to used Yo-kai Keystones to harness the power of summoning Yo-kai and also allows them to transform through either Lightside or Shadowside forms. Alongside Cole and Bruno, she fights against the Oni King Rasen and the Onimaro to protect humans and Yo-kai. In Yo-kai Watch Shadowside, she runs the Yo-kai Detective Agency alongside Cole and Bruno.
Cole / Touma Tsukinami (月浪トウマ, Tsukinami Tōma)
Voiced by: Yudai Chiba (movie), Yoshiaki Hasegawa (anime)
Cole is a 13-year-old junior high schooler who, growing up, he was often alone because his parents were away overseas. As a result, he was often bullied by his peers and over time became antisocial and hateful towards others. In Yo-kai Watch Shadowside: Oni-ō no Fukkatsu, he is cursed by one of Rasen's Onimaro followers and given the Kigan Gear, which he uses to spread evil and malice. Later in the film, he is redeemed by Summer and Bruno and the Kigan Gear transforms into the Yo-kai Watch Ogre, which allows him to transform into four Progenitor Yo-kai and used Sacred Armorys to possession summon Sword Bearer Yo-kai. In Yo-kai Watch Shadowside, he runs the Yo-kai Detective Agency alongside Summer and Bruno.
Bruno / Akinori Arihoshi (有星アキノリ, Arihoshi Akinori)
Voiced by: Mutsumi Tamura
Bruno is a 13-year-old apprentice shaman and the oldest of the Arihoshi siblings, who have used Yo-kai in fortune telling for many generations. Unlike Summer and Cole, he is capable of using spells and incantations. He also possesses the Yo-kai Watch Animas, allowing him to used Celestial Disks to summon Celestial Yo-kai. In Yo-kai Watch Shadowside, he runs the Yo-kai Detective Agency alongside Summer and Cole.
Tate Adams / Keisuke Amano (天野ケースケ, Amano Keisuke)
Voiced by: Haruka Tomatsu
Tate Adams is a 11-year-old fifth-grade student, Nate and Katie's son and Summer's younger brother, He does not believe in supernatural phenomena. In Yo-kai Watch Shadowside: Oni-ō no Fukkatsu, he is cursed by the Onimaro virus and turned into a Kaodeka Oni, but is cured after Rasen is defeated by Cole and the Onimaro virus is eradicated from the city.
Whisper (ウィスパー, Wisupā)
Voiced by: Tomokazu Seki (Japanese); Joey D'Auria (Season 1-2), Michael Sorich (Season 3) (English)
Whisper is a Yo-kai of the Slippery Tribe who becomes Nate's self-appointed butler after he frees him from the capsule he was imprisoned in 190 years and helps him to understand the Yo-kai World and its interactions with the human world. Whisper claims to be very knowledgeable about Yo-kai, but in reality relies heavily on a tablet computer called the Yokai Pad (妖怪パッド, Yōkai Paddo) to look up information. He often dismisses Nate's suspicions that a Yo-kai is involved with mysterious occurrences in his life, only to be proven wrong almost instantly. Following an incident with the Yo-kai Watch Model Zero, Nate can switch between the different Yo-kai Watch models by putting his arm inside Whisper's mouth. In the anime, it is revealed he was a Yo-kai named Nonuttin (Shittakaburi (シッタカブリ; from shittakaburi (知ったかぶり, "know-it-all")) in Japan), whose belches cause people to claim to know all about things when they actually do not. When he was Nonuttin, he worked alongside Ishida Mitsunari (Shogun Waitington in English).
Jibanyan (ジバニャン; from jibakurei (地縛霊, "residual haunting") and nyan (にゃん, "meow"))
Voiced by: Etsuko Kozakura (original series), Takaya Kuroda (Shadowside) (Japanese); Alicyn Packard (Season 1-2) Kira Buckland (Season 3) (English)
Jibanyan is a nekomata Yo-kai of the Charming Tribe who is the ghost of the cat Rudy (Akamaru (アカマル) in Japanese). Rudy was the pet of a teenager named Amy until he died after being hit by a truck while crossing an intersection. He has since become a residual haunting and possesses people to make them cross the street without waiting for the signal so he can try to fight the cars and avenge his death. When Nate believes that Jibanyan is brave for his actions, Jibanyan is surprised and overwhelmed with joy and befriends Nate. He later ends up staying at Nate's house, where he often spends his time eating his favorite chocolate bars or worshipping his favorite idol group, Next HarMEOWny. Jibanyan had assumed that Amy called him lame for dying, but after being sent back in time by the two Yo-kai Kin and Gin of the Wicked Tribe, he learns that she was actually referring to herself and that he had died saving her from being hit by a truck as she crossed the intersection to meet with her friends. Jibanyan can transform into different Yo-kai under certain circumstances. While possessed by Roughraff, Jibanyan becomes the bōsōzoku-inspired Baddinyan, who thinks he is doing bad things but is actually not scary. When he gets a cold, he becomes Thornyan (トゲニャン), who is green and grows cactus-like spikes that shoot out when he sneezes. In Yo-kai Watch 2, he can fuse with Whisper to create Buchinyan (ブチニャン). When Nate receives the Yo-kai Medal of the Legendary Yo-kai Shogunyan, Jibanyan becomes possessed by his legendary spirit and takes on the appearance of a samurai.
Komasan (コマさん; from komainu (狛犬))
Voiced by: Aya Endō (original series), Daisuke Hirakawa (Shadowside) (Japanese); Melissa Hutchison (Season 1-2), Erika Harlacher (Season 3) (English)
Komasan is a lion dog Yo-kai of the Charming Tribe from the countryside who Nate and Whisper meet while he is visiting the city for the first time. He is Komajiro's older brother, but when the shrine he used to guard was knocked down for construction, he tried to adapt to life in the city. However, he is overwhelmed by its sights and sounds and his love for soft serve ice cream. He is featured prominently in the anime series and is one of the main protagonists of Yo-kai Watch Blasters and its sequel Yo-kai Watch Blasters 2. In the anime, his "Mini Corner" segments feature him adapting to life in the city while working in a toy company and falling in love with a manga artist. In Japanese, he tends to use Mongē (もんげー) as an exclamation and ends his sentences with zura (ズラ), while in the English dub, he speaks in a country dialect and often exclaims "Oh my swirls!" when amazed. In Yo-kai Watch: Enma Daiō to Itsutsu no Monogatari da Nyan!, he and Komajiro gain an adoptive human brother named Komasaburo.
In Yo-kai Watch 2, the player can get a special version of Komasan who has a frog-mouth pouch (がまぐちポーチ, gamaguchi pōchi).
Komajiro (コマじろう, Komajirō; -jirō (二郎) is a common name component in Japan traditionally given to the second born son in the family)
Voiced by: Aya Endō (Japanese); Alicyn Packard (Season 1-2), Christine Marie Cabanos (Season 3) (English)
Komajiro is a lion dog Yo-kai who is Komasan's younger brother and also of the Charming Tribe. He is more outgoing and ready to experience the city than Komasan, and has adapted to city life better than him. In Yo-kai Watch: Enma Daiō to Itsutsu no Monogatari da Nyan!, he and Komasan gain an adoptive human brother named Komasaburo.
Usapyon / USApyon (USAピョン; from "USA", usagi (うさぎ, "rabbit"), and pyonpyon (ぴょんぴょん, "bouncing"))
Voiced by: Kotori Shigemoto (Japanese); Katie Leigh (Season 3), Danilo Diniz (Season 3 - Portuguese), Melissa Hutchison (Blasters) (English)
Usapyon is a Merican Yo-kai of the Shady Tribe who introduces Hailey Anne to Yo-kai. Despite wearing a rabbit-shaped astronaut suit with rabbit ears on the helmet, he is not a rabbit. When Hailey Anne pushes him too far, he becomes outraged and activates his "Invader Mode" (ベイダーモード, Beidā Mōdo) to start firing his laser gun everywhere thus Hailey Anne say sorry. In life, he was an otter named Chibi (チビ), who was taken in by rocket scientist Dr. Hughly and poised to be the first small animal to survive going into space, but was killed in a rocket malfunction he accidentally caused. As a Merican Yo-kai, Usapyon wants to make Hughly's dream a reality by making a new rocket powered by Yo-kai Medals, seeking out Hailey's help to build it.

== Media ==
Release timeline
2013	Yo-kai Watch
2013	Yo-kai Taiso Dai-Ichi Puzzle da Nyan
2014	Yo-kai Watch 2: Bony Spirits & Fleshy Souls
2014	Yo-kai Watch 2: Psychic Specters
2014	Yo-kai Watch: Tomodachi UkiUkipedia
2015	Yo-kai Watch Blasters
2015	Yo-kai Watch Dance: Just Dance Special Version
2015	Yo-kai Watch: Wibble Wobble
2015	Yo-kai Watch Busters: Iron Oni Force
2016	Yo-kai Sangokushi
2016	Yo-kai Watch 3: Sushi & Tempura
2016	Yo-kai Watch 3: Sukiyaki
2017	Yo-kai Watch Busters 2: Secret of the Legendary Treasure Bambalaya
2018	Yo-kai Sangokushi: Kunitori Wars
2018	Yo-kai Watch: Gerapo Rhythm
2018	Yo-kai Daijiten
2018	Yo-kai Watch World
2019	Yo-kai Watch 4
2019	Yo-kai Watch: Medal Wars
2019	Yo-kai Watch 4++
2020	Yo-kai Watch Jam - Yo-kai Academy Y: Yeah-Yeah School Life
2021
2022
2023
2024
2025
TBA	Yo-kai Watch 2: Haunted Domain

=== Main series ===
The main video game series are role-playing video games where the player befriends Yo-kai and fights evil Yo-kai that seek to rule the world, with emphasis placed on fighting and befriending Yo-kai. Yo-kai Watch and Yo-kai Watch 2 have a battle system revolving around using the 3DS's touchscreen to rotate amongst the player's Yo-kai. All Yo-kai have powerful moves called Soultimates, with some being offensive and some being supportive. In Yo-kai Watch 3, the battle system was changed to a grid-based movement system, with the added ability to use Dream Link and Yo-kai Blaster against foes during battle.

==== Yo-kai Watch ====
The first video game in the main series, Yo-kai Watch, was announced at the 2011 Tokyo Game Show and first released in Japan on July 11, 2013. It sets the foundation for the rest of the video game franchise, introducing its main mechanics. The game was released in North America on November 6, 2015, and in Europe on April 29, 2016.

==== Yo-kai Watch 2 ====
The second video game in the main series, Yo-kai Watch 2, was released in Japan on July 10, 2014, as two versions: Ganso and Honke. These versions are known in English as Bony Spirits and Fleshy Souls. Yo-kai Watch 2 adds several new areas, such as Kemamoto/Harrisville, and nearly 100 new Yo-kai to befriend, both in the present day and the past. The plot revolves around the protagonist going back in time 60 years to meet their grandfather, who made the predecessor to the Yo-kai Watch, and fighting against the Wicked Yo-kai led by Dame Dedtime, the main antagonist of the second game. A third version, Shinuchi, known in English as Psychic Specters, was released on December 12, 2014 to coincide with the first Yo-kai Watch film, Yo-kai Watch: Tanjō no Himitsu da Nyan!. Psychic Specters features characters and scenarios not included in Bony Spirits and Fleshy Souls.

Bony Spirits and Fleshy Souls were localized in English and released on September 30, 2016, in the United States and on April 7, 2017, in Europe. They received the Oni Evolution update on September 14, 2017, and gained compatibility with save data from Psychic Specters on September 29, 2017.

==== Yo-kai Watch 3 ====
In Japan, Yo-kai Watch 3 was announced alongside Yo-kai Watch Busters in April 2015 and released on July 16, 2016, with two versions: Sushi and Tempura. The game features two protagonists: Nathan "Nate" Adams and Hailey Anne Thomas, each with their own story. Nate's story focuses on him and his family moving from Springdale to the United States, which is called BBQ in the localized version, to the fictional town of St. Peanutsburg, where new American-themed "Merican" (メリケン, Meriken) Yo-kai are found. Hailey Anne's story focuses on her meeting her partner Merican Yo-kai Usapyon and opening a detective agency with him. These two stories converge in the game's latter half as the two team up to face a greater threat called The Ghoulfather, The main antagonist of the third game. A third version, Sukiyaki, was released in Japan on December 16, 2016, combining Sushi and Tempura into one game and adding additional features.

On September 27, 2018, Nintendo of America announced that Yo-kai Watch 3 would receive a localized release outside of Japan. It was released on December 16, 2018, in Europe and on February 8, 2019, in North America. The localized version was based on Sukiyaki, and as such contains the features it added.

==== Yo-kai Watch 4 ====
Yo-kai Watch 4 was released for the Nintendo Switch in Japan on June 20, 2019, featuring a new artstyle and character designs from Yo-kai Watch Shadowside, as well as the original designs. The game includes main characters from previous games as well as the main characters from Yo-kai Watch Shadowside and Yo-kai Watch: Forever Friends.

An enhanced version, Yo-kai Watch 4++, was later released as paid downloadable content and at retail for both the Switch and PlayStation 4 on December 5, 2019.

Level-5 confirmed during the Anime Expo 2019 that an English localization was under consideration, but due to the shutdown of American branch Level-5 Abby, the status of the game's localization is currently unknown.

=== Spin-off video game series ===
==== Blasters ====
A spin-off video game, Yo-kai Watch Busters (妖怪ウォッチバスターズ, Yōkai Wotchi Basutāzu) was first announced in the April 2015 issue of CoroCoro Comic alongside Yo-kai Watch 3, allowing up to four players to cooperate in completing missions and battling boss Yo-kai. The first two versions of the game, Aka Neko-dan (赤猫団; "Red Cat Troupe") and Shiro Inu-tai (白犬隊; "White Dog Corps"), were released on July 11, 2015. A free expansion called Getto-gumi (月兎組; "Moon Rabbit Crew") was released on December 12, 2015, adding characters and settings featured in the second film, Yo-kai Watch: Enma Daiō to Itsutsu no Monogatari da Nyan!.

A sequel, Yo-kai Watch Busters 2: Secret of the Legendary Treasure Bambalaya (妖怪ウォッチバスターズ2秘宝伝説バンバラヤー, Yōkai Wotchi Basutāzu 2 Hihō Densetsu Banbarayā), was released in two versions, (ソード; "Sword") and (マグナム; "Magnum"), on December 16, 2017. They are compatible with save data from the first Busters games as well as the three versions of Yo-kai Watch 3.

The first game was localized in English regions as Yo-kai Watch Blasters and released on September 7, 2018. The games were released under the names Red Cat Corps and White Dog Squad. A free update for both games, Moon Rabbit Crew, was released on September 27, 2018.

Busters 2 has not been localized into English, and most likely will never be because the Nintendo 3DS's production was discontinued.

==== Other associated games ====
The Data Carddass game Yo-kai Watch: Tomodachi UkiUkipedia (妖怪ウォッチ ともだちウキウキペディア) was first location tested in late December 2013, and debuted at the Next Generation World Hobby Fair Winter 2014 before being released in early 2014. The game is similar to Bandai's other Data Carddass games, as the player uses an interface resembling a slot machine to determine the events of a battle between three of the player's Yo-kai and three enemy Yo-kai. Winning the game awards the player with a card that can be used in future Tomodachi UkiUkipedia play.

Yo-kai Sangokushi (妖怪三国志; lit. 'Yo-kai Three Kingdoms') was announced alongside Blasters and Yo-kai Watch 3 in April 2015. Sangokushi was made in collaboration with Koei Tecmo's Romance of the Three Kingdoms series as well as several mobile games.

In August 2015, a collaboration with Ubisoft to release a special version of the Just Dance series was announced, set to feature songs from the anime's soundtrack. Titled Yo-kai Watch Dance: Just Dance Special Version (妖怪ウォッチダンス JUST DANCE(ジャストダンス) スペシャルバージョン, Yōkai Uotchi Dansu: Jasuto Dansu Supesharu Bājon), it was released exclusively in Japan for the Wii U on December 5, 2015.

On June 27, 2018, Level-5 and GungHo Online Entertainment announced in a special live stream the release of Yo-kai Watch World. Before the same-day release of the game, Level-5 teased it online as a "game that will shock the world". Said to compete with Pokémon Go, it featured new gameplay mechanics as well as battle sequences similar to the original 3DS games. The game was only playable in Japan, and service for Yo-kai Watch World was discontinued on December 23, 2022.

==== Console-based spin-offs ====
- Yo-kai Watch Blasters (Nintendo 3DS, 2015) – released worldwide (outside Korea) on September 7, 2018, with Moon Rabbit Crew update released on September 27, 2018
- Yo-kai Watch Dance: Just Dance Special Version (Wii U, 2015) – Exclusive to Japan, developed by Ubisoft as part of the Just Dance series
- Yo-kai Sangokushi (Nintendo 3DS, 2016) – Japan only, Collaboration with Koei Techmo's Romance of the Three Kingdoms series
- Yo-kai Watch Busters 2: Secret of the Legendary Treasure Bambalaya (Nintendo 3DS, 2017) — Japan only
- Yo-kai Watch Jam - Yo-kai Academy Y: Yeah-Yeah School Life (Nintendo Switch, 2020) — Japan only

==== Smartphone apps ====
- Yo-kai Land (iOS, Android, 2015) – Produced by Hasbro
- Yo-kai Taiso Dai-Ichi Puzzle da Nyan (ようかい体操第一 パズルだニャン, Yōkai Taisō Dai-Ichi Pazuru da Nyan; lit. 'Yo-kai Exercise No. 1: Puzzle Meow') (iOS, Android, 2013)
- Yo-kai Watch: Wibble Wobble (妖怪ウォッチ ぷにぷに, Yōkai Wotchi Puni-puni) (iOS, Android, 2015)
- Yo-kai Watch: Gerapo Rhythm (妖怪ウォッチ ゲラポリズム, Yōkai Wotchi Gerapo Rizumu) (iOS, Android, 2018)
- Yo-kai Daijiten (妖怪大辞典; lit. 'Great Yo-kai Dictionary') (iOS, Android, 2018)
- Yo-kai Sangokushi: Kunitori Wars (妖怪三国志 国盗りウォーズ, Yōkai Wocchi Kunitori Wōzu) (iOS, Android, 2018) – Co-produced with Koei Tecmo
- Yo-kai Watch World (妖怪ウォッチワールド, Yōkai Wocchi Wārudo) (iOS, Android, June 27, 2018) – Co-produced by GungHo Online Entertainment inc., with a Google Maps-based engine
- Yo-kai Watch: Medal Wars (妖怪ウォッチ メダルウォーズ, Yōkai Wocchi Medaru Wōzu) (iOS, Android, 2019) – Co-produced with Netmarble

=== Manga and comics ===
Six manga adaptations based on the series have been published by Shogakukan. A series by Noriyuki Konishi began serialization in CoroCoro Comic from December 15, 2012. This series has been licensed by Viz Media under its Perfect Square imprint for its North American releases up to Volume 10, and is now directly from Viz Media as of Volume 11. The manga is licensed in French by Kazé.

A shōjo manga series by Chikako Mori, titled Yo-kai Watch: Exciting Nyanderful Days (妖怪ウォッチ～わくわく☆にゃんだふるデイズ～, Yōkai Wotchi ~Wakuwaku Nyandafuru Deizu~), was serialized in Ciao magazine from December 27, 2013, to 2017. In this series, it was based on the parallel timeline, in which Katie Forester would receive the Yo-kai Watch. This is in contrast to the main timeline, where Nathan "Nate" Adams is the primary.

A yonkoma series by Coconas Rumba, titled 4-Panel Yo-kai Watch: Geragera Manga Theater (4コマ妖怪ウォッチ ゲラゲラマンガ劇場, Yonkoma Yōkai Wotchi Geragera Manga Gekijō), has been serialized in CoroCoro Comic SPECIAL from August 30, 2014, to June 30, 2018.

Another yonkoma series by Santa Harukaze, titled Yo-kai Watch 4-Panel Pun Club (妖怪ウォッチ 4コマだじゃれクラブ, Yōkai Wotchi Yonkoma Dajare Kurabu), began serialization in CoroCoro Ichiban! from April 2015.

A series by Shō Shibamoto, titled Komasan 〜A Time for Fireworks and Miracles〜 (コマさん 〜ハナビとキセキの時間〜, Komasan 〜Hanabi to Kiseki no Jikan〜), began serialization in the seinen manga magazine Hibana on April 10, 2015, and ended on September 10 of that year.

A manga series based on Yo-kai Watch Blasters by Atsushi Ohba began serialization in CoroCoro Comic in June 2015 and ended in October of that year.

A comic book series was announced in January 2017, courtesy of IDW Publishing, and was released in May 2017.

==== Noriyuki Konishi version ====
Loosely based on the main Yo-kai Watch series, a manga series by Noriyuki Konishi started serialization before the release of Yo-kai Watch on the 3DS, and the debut of the original Yo-kai Watch anime. In the series, the art style was different from the current designs, like the early design of the Yo-kai Watch, and also has different character personalities. As the games and anime were released, the manga kept the art style, but the characters also slowly developed over time.

Volume 16 transitioned the manga into the current Yo-kai Watch! timeline, while still keeping the art style of the previous edition.

No.	Original release date	Original ISBN	English release date	English ISBN
1	June 28, 2013	978-4-09-141655-1	November 3, 2015	978-1-4215-8251-1
2	December 27, 2013	978-4-09-140018-5	November 3, 2015	978-1-4215-8252-8
3	March 25, 2014	978-4-09-141709-1	January 5, 2016	978-1-4215-8273-3
4	July 25, 2014	978-4-09-141793-0	March 1, 2016	978-1-4215-8274-0
5	October 28, 2014	978-4-09-141817-3	May 3, 2016	978-1-4215-8275-7
6	February 27, 2015	978-4-09-141876-0	December 6, 2016	978-1-4215-9217-6
7	June 26, 2015	978-4-09-142006-0	March 7, 2017	978-1-4215-9218-3
8	September 28, 2015	978-4-09-142102-9	January 2, 2018	978-1-4215-9691-4
9	February 26, 2016	978-4-09-142119-7	July 3, 2018	978-1-4215-9753-9
10	June 24, 2016	978-4-09-142175-3	January 8, 2019	978-1-4215-9754-6
11	August 5, 2016	978-4-09-159232-3	May 14, 2019	978-1-4215-9755-3
12	April 28, 2017	978-4-09-142389-4	September 12, 2019	978-1-9747-0310-4
13	September 28, 2017	978-4-09-142530-0	January 14, 2020	978-1-9747-0311-1
14	November 28, 2017	978-4-09-142637-6	May 12, 2020	978-1-9747-0312-8
15	May 28, 2018	978-4-09-142710-6	September 8, 2020	978-1-9747-0608-2
16	July 26, 2019	978-4-09-143046-5	January 12, 2021	978-1-9747-1858-0
17	October 28, 2019	978-4-09-143109-7	May 11, 2021	978-1-9747-1881-8
18	July 28, 2020	978-4-09-143209-4	September 14, 2021	978-1-9747-1485-8
19	August 27, 2021	978-4-09-143339-8	August 9, 2022	978-1-9747-3210-4
20	December 27, 2021	978-4-09-143367-1	January 10, 2023	978-1-9747-3424-5
21	April 27, 2022	978-4-09-143390-9	May 9, 2023	978-1-9747-3697-3
22	December 27, 2022	978-4-09-143575-0	January 9, 2024	978-1-9747-4300-1
23	May 26, 2023	978-4-09-143615-3	June 18, 2024	978-1-9747-4571-5

==== Yo-kai Watch: Exciting Nyanderful Days ====
No.	Release date	ISBN
1	December 25, 2014	978-4-09-136714-3
2	October 30, 2015	978-4-09-137888-0
3	July 22, 2016	978-4-09-138609-0

==== Yo-kai Watch: 4-Panel Pun-Club ====
No.	Release date	ISBN
1	June 18, 2015	978-4-09-281232-1
2	January 28, 2016	978-4-09-281233-8
3	November 30, 2016	978-4-09-281234-5
4	December 6, 2017	978-4-09-281237-6

==== Yo-kai Watch Busters ====
No.	Release date	ISBN
1	September 28, 2015	978-4-09-142100-5

==== 4-Panel Yo-kai Watch: Geragera Manga Theater ====
No.	Release date	ISBN
1	October 28, 2015	978-4-09-142105-0
2	November 28, 2016	978-4-09-142233-0
3	July 27, 2018	978-4-09-142794-6

==== Komasan: A Time for Fireworks and Miracles ====
No.	Release date	ISBN
1	December 11, 2015	978-4-09-187427-6
2	December 12, 2016	978-4-09-189330-7

=== Anime ===
An anime television series based on the game, produced by OLM, aired from January 8, 2014, to March 30, 2018, in Japan and began airing on Disney XD on October 5, 2015. It is more comedic in tone, and has several segments per episode, with most focusing on Nathan "Nate" Adams solving problems caused by mischievous Yo-kai. Some episodes have a "Mini-Corner" featuring one of the main Yo-kai. The English theme song is sung by Jeff "Swampy" Marsh, best known as one of the creators of the fellow Disney show Phineas and Ferb. To help promote the series for its sister network, Disney Channel aired a special preview episode on December 18, 2015.

On April 7, 2015, Level-5 unveiled a promotional video for the anime series' second season, which premiered in July 2015. The second season features a new protagonist named Hailey Anne Thomas and her Merican Yo-kai companion Usapyon, as well as new models of the Yo-kai Watch called "Yo-kai Watch Model U" and "Yo-kai Watch Dream". The third season premiered on January 4, 2017, and entered a Blasters Arc in July. In February 2018, a new anime series and follow-up to the Yo-kai Watch Shadowside: Oni-ō no Fukkatsu film called Yo-kai Watch Shadowside started airing after the original anime series ended on March 31, 2018, with its first two episodes broadcast as an hour-long special on April 13, 2018. The series lasted for 49 episodes, ending on March 29, 2019.

A revival series known as Yo-kai Watch! ran from April 5, 2019, to December 20, 2019, in Japan. It is a sequel to the original Yo-kai Watch anime series that introduces new Yo-kai while serving as a sort of prequel to the Yo-kai Watch Shadowside: Oni-ō no Fukkatsu film, as Nate receives "Yo-kai Watch Arcane Model K", which resembles "Yo-kai Watch Arcane" used by Summer Adams and occasionally Tate Adams in Shadowside. While mostly based on the original series, it features elements from Shadowside, such as the Yo-kai Keystones and the Lightside and Shadowside forms.

Yo-kai Watch Jam: Yo-kai Academy Y: Close Encounters of the N Kind ran from December 27, 2019, to April 2, 2021, as a follow-up of the Yo-kai Watch Jam the Movie: Yo-Kai Academy Y – Can a Cat be a Hero? film.

Another revival series, Yo-kai Watch♪, officially known in English as Yo-kai Watch: Reborn started airing on April 9, 2021, to March 31, 2023, it is the sequel to the Yo-kai Watch! anime series and prequel to the Yo-kai Watch Shadowside: Oni-ō no Fukkatsu film which Nate now uses an "enhanced" version of the original Yo-kai Watch model which can recognize all types of Yo-kai Medals.

In the course of the franchise's history, eight Yo-kai Watch movies have been made. The first, Yo-kai Watch: The Movie, was released in Japan on December 20, 2014, The second film, Yo-kai Watch: Enma Daiō to Itsutsu no Monogatari da Nyan!, was released in Japan on December 19, 2015, and the third film, Yo-kai Watch: Soratobu Kujira to Double no Sekai no Daibōken da Nyan!, a live-action animated film, was released in Japan on December 17, 2016 The fourth film, Yo-kai Watch Shadowside: Oni-ō no Fukkatsu, released in Japanese theatres on December 16, 2017. A fifth movie, Yo-kai Watch: Forever Friends, released in Japanese theatres on December 14, 2018. A sixth movie, Yo-kai Watch Jam the Movie: Yo-Kai Academy Y – Can a Cat be a Hero?, was released in Japanese theatres on December 13, 2019. A seventh movie, Yo-kai Watch♪ the Movie: How Nate and I Met Nyan!♪ M-Me Too~♪♪, was released in Japanese theatres on November 12, 2021. It is based on the Yo-kai Watch♪ anime series and features re-edited versions of segments from the original anime series, as well as some original content. An eighth movie, Yo-kai Watch♪: Jibanyan vs. Komasan - The Big Amazing Battle, Nyan, was released in Japan on January 13, 2023, based on the Yo-kai Watch♪ anime series and used as its two-part series finale.

The series is being released on DVD box sets, along with rental DVDs, in Japan by Kadokawa Media Factory. Every episode to date is available for streaming on multiple video on demand services in Japan, such as Hulu and Rakuten Video Showtime.

==== Overseas ====
At the premiere of the Yo-kai Watch film, Level-5's president Akihiro Hino officially announced that the Yo-kai Watch anime would begin broadcast internationally in 2015. He also jokingly requested Etsuko Kozakura and Tomokazu Seki, who voice Jibanyan and Whisper respectively, to "study English".

==== In North America ====
Dentsu Entertainment USA announced in April 2014 that they were seeking broadcast and merchandising partners in North America for the anime. The anime began broadcast as a 26-episode season on Disney XD on October 5, 2015, with the official Yo-kai Watch YouTube channel posting episodes a month later. Since the show had performed well, a second season (no relation to the Japanese second season) with an additional 50 episodes was broadcast on August 1, 2016. The third season premiered on July 2, 2018, on Disney XD in the United States, and ended on December 29, 2018. In March 2019, Disney XD removed the Yo-kai Watch anime from its lineup due to declining ratings; but eventually returned to the network in a weekend-only timeslot in January 2020, re-taking the place of a previous replacement, Inazuma Eleven: Ares, before airing for the last time on August 16 of that year, once again due to poor ratings. The first season's first volume was released on DVD by NCircle Entertainment on February 26, 2019, and one version of that set comes with a free comic book. The first season's second volume was released on September 3, 2019.

The first movie was also brought over, as a special screening one day screening, on October 15, 2016. This was only in the US, via Fathom Events. Those who attended got a Hovernyan medal. Outside of the US, the first season and the movie used to be available to stream on Netflix, but as of now, it is no longer available to stream.

The English version of the anime dub used a cast from Sprite Animation Studios for the first two seasons, but they were replaced in the third season with actors from SDI Media due to budget costs and low ratings on Disney XD.

MarVista Entertainment has licensed the series in Latin America, and it also localized the second movie despite never airing in the U.S., so the movie was dubbed based on the Japanese version (which also kept the promotional ending of the third Yo-kai watch movie despite never being dubbed afterwards).

==== In Europe and Africa ====
Viz Media Europe has licensed the series in Europe, Russia, and Africa. They premiered the anime in the UK and Ireland on Cartoon Network on April 23, 2016. In France it showed on three different stations: Boing in April, 2016, Gulli in September, 2016, and Cartoon Network France in March, 2017. Other countries it aired in are Germany and Austria (Nickelodeon), Italy, Spain and Africa on Boing, Belgium and the Netherlands on Nickelodeon, and Israel on Noga. Cartoon Network also has it airing on their Portugal, Turkey, Poland and the Nordic, Central and Eastern Europe feeds, starting in Spring 2016.

Viz has also hired Bulldog Licensing and German brand-management company m4e to represent the brand in the UK and German-speaking territories, respectively.

==== Asia ====
An alternative English dub began airing on Cartoon Network Asia and Toonami Asia in Asian countries from June 27, 2015. The alternative English dub uses the original Japanese names.

Shogakukan Asia also licensed the manga series in the Philippines. Similarly, for a few years, GMA Network also made a Tagalog dub of the original anime.

In Indonesia, this anime also aired on Indosiar in 2016, and on RTV starting March 18, 2021.

For Yo-kai Watch Shadowside, a subbed version aired in the Southeast Asia area, in 2019 via Animax Asia.

==== In Australia and New Zealand ====
The Fusion Agency acquired the licensing and merchandising rights for the series in Australia and New Zealand. It aired in Australia on 9Go! on December 14, 2015.

=== Music ===
The music for the games and anime series is composed by Level-5 employee Kenichiro Saigo. The following themes are used in both the video games and anime series. In the original anime, all opening themes are performed by King Cream Soda, with lyrics by m.o.v.e vocalist Motsu. The anime themes are also dubbed into English for its North American broadcast.

Recent seasons of the anime have had opening and ending themes performed by Japanese YouTubers such as Soraru, Rinu, and Strawberry Prince.

== Merchandise ==
Various toys, such as the eponymous Yo-kai Watch and Yo-kai Medals, have been produced based on the series, receiving high commercial success. Hasbro released a toy line based on the series worldwide in December 2015. In July 2016, Square Enix's MMORPG Final Fantasy XIV: A Realm Reborn held a special crossover event lasting until October which allowed players to gather Medals from existing in-game battles and exchange them for minions modeled after the franchise's titular Yo-kai as well as weapons inspired by them. In January 2018, McDonald's began offering Yo-kai Watch toys in US Happy Meals, alongside the much more popular Shopkins.

== Reception ==
The original Yo-kai Watch game received a score of 36/40 from Famitsu, with its sequel Yo-kai Watch 2 also scoring 36/40. Yo-kai Watch 2 won the Grand Prize in the Japan Game Awards. It also won 3 other awards: The Best Sales Award, and two Excellence Awards (for the 2nd game and its third version). In 2014, Yo-kai Watch's manga in CoroCoro Comic won the 38th Kodansha Manga Award in the Best Children's Manga category. In the following year, it also was awarded the Best Children's manga at the 60th Shogakukan Manga Awards.

Series mascot Jibanyan was at the center of artwork for the 2014 holding of the World Hobby Fair, was chosen as the kids goodwill ambassador of the Hawaii Tourism Board in Japan in 2015, and was one of the 8 "Olympics Ambassadors" for the 2020 Summer Olympics.

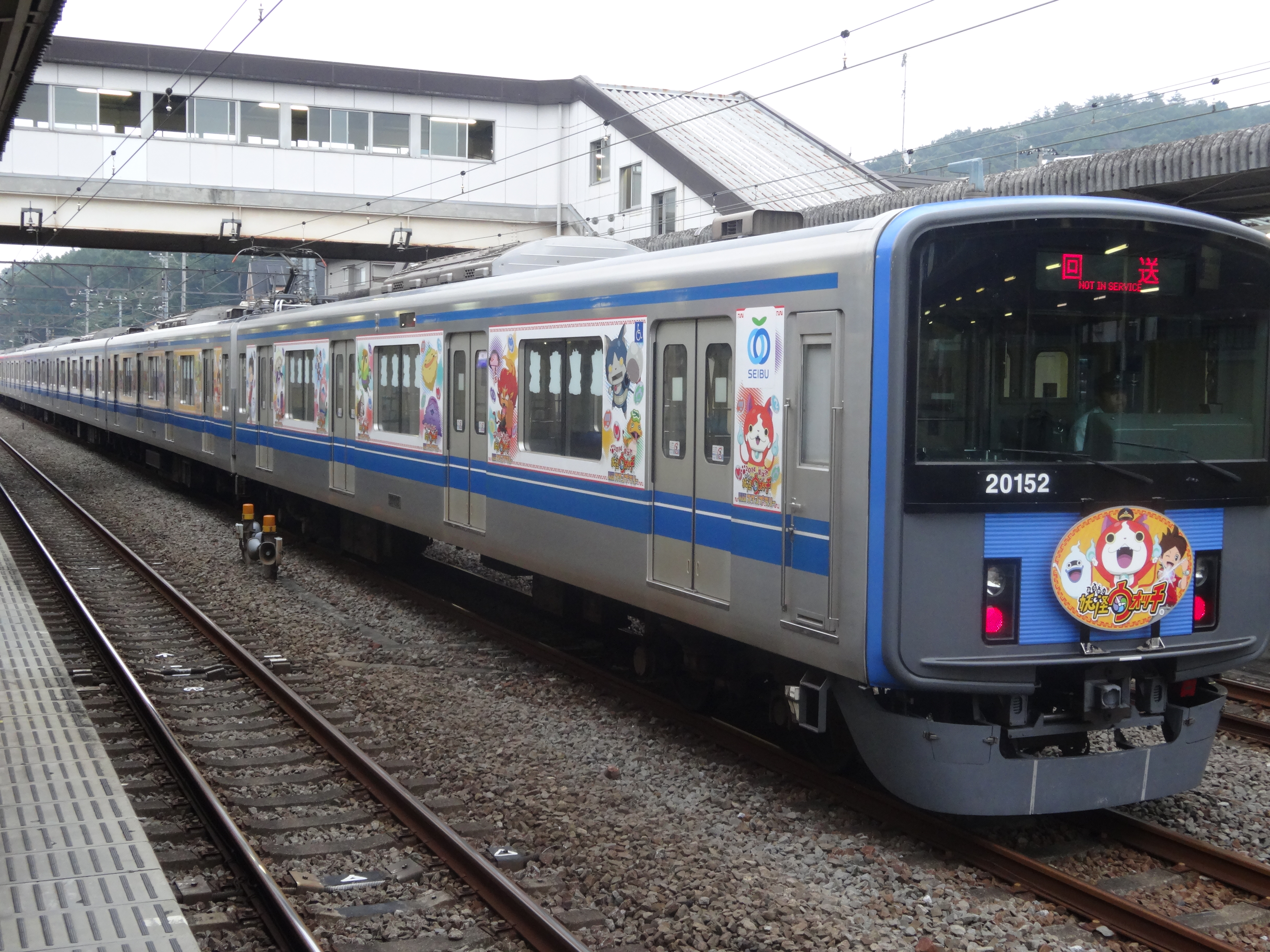
Seibu Series train: Yo-Kai Watch

When the anime first aired, in 2014, the franchise became popular in Japan. By February, the first game, which originally sold only 53,654 copies, was at over 500,000 shipped and the anime was surpassing Pokémon in the TV rankings; being compared to it and being dubbed the "Pokémon Killer". By the second game's release, the first game had sold 1,195,287 copies and the second game surpassed that at release at 1,316,707 copies. The third version also impressed, at 1,244,171 units.

Even the president of Level-5, Akihiro Hino, was surprised by Yo-kai Watch's popularity. "While I did believe that it would get its break, honestly, to have it come this far, where the children of Japan would get so hopped-up on Yo-kai, to the point where all the goods would sell out, is something I didn't expect." They were the second most popular characters in Japan, in a survey by Video Research Ltd. Explanations for its popularity ranged from catchy songs and dances, to being something parents and kids could enjoy together, to "weird adults" not being interested in it. Hino himself said that it was the relatable characters and situations relatable to modern kids that made it popular.

This also translated into toy sales, racking in 55.2 billion yen for Namco Bandai. Yo-kai Watch toys were frequently out of stock; people having to wait in lotteries to get a Yo-kai Watch and search hard for medals. Other merchandise had to wait longer because of the long licensing wait times. This demand made it the second highest product in Nikkei Trendy that year.

It was a top seller in many other areas as well: The Yo-kai Watch Guide was the number one book in 2014, its first theme song, Geragerapo no Uta, was the number 50 song on the Oricon Singles Chart, and the movie had the highest opening of any Japanese film since 2000. Yo-kai Watch even had a special segment on Kohaku Uta Gassen, Japan's most viewed music program.

Marc Steinberg, writing in Animation: An Interdisciplinary Journal, analyses Yo-kai Watch as an effective media mix that mobilized children toward collection-based consumption through anime, games, watches and medals.

=== Decline ===
By 2015, sales had started to fall to numbers ranging from around a quarter to 1/8 of what they were the previous year. Prices were cut and there was less visible excitement among children. By the time the third games were released, in 2016, it was on a downward slope with the game launching with about half of what the second games did, with 632,135 units and the third version of the game launched with half of what the first versions sold with 337,979 units. The toy sales were 10.4 billion yen in 2016 and estimated to be at 6.3 billion yen in 2017. This was largely due to hype building for two games that were coming from Nintendo's Pokémon franchise, the Pokémon Go smartphone app and Pokémon Sun and Moon for the 3DS.

In addition to the wake of Pokémon's renewed popularity, analysts had a few other theories on why Yo-kai Watch was falling. Ken Hōri of The Business Journal and Ollie Barder of Forbes thought it was mainly distribution issues; products that were ordered from the summer vacation were over stocked, because of the six-month waiting period for copyright approvals. Another reason he had was that the toys had incompatible medals with later watches, leading to a loss of interest. Barder and Sato of Siliconera also mentioned oversaturation, with it being Sato's main focus.

Unlike in its native Japan where it experienced a short period of great popularity, Yo-kai Watch had an overall underwhelming performance in the United States. Although it got off to a promising start in that region, with the original game selling at least 400,000 units there as of 2016, the sequel, Yo-kai Watch 2, sold less than 200,000 copies in comparison. Meanwhile, Disney XD's English broadcast of the anime series has estimated only 100,000-300,000 viewers per episode, and was removed from the network's schedule in 2017. Despite the franchise's unsatisfactory Western response, it maintains a cult following with attempts to revive the franchise such as #SaveYoKaiWatch which trended on Twitter. The franchise is also popular in Europe, with the original game's sales out pacing the Japanese release as of October 2016.

== See also ==
- GeGeGe no Kitarō, a Japanese manga series with several Yo-kai Watch crossovers, including Yo-kai Watch Shadowside: Oni-ō no Fukkatsu and Natsuhiko Kyogoku's novel series USO Makoto Yōkai Hyaku Monogatari.
- Metalions, a South Korean 3D animated series in which characters use wrist summoning devices called Infinity Watches that summon Metalions and with Archean Stones can temporarily upgrade and combine them
- Power Battle Watch Car (aka Wrist Racers), a South Korean 3D animated series in which characters use WatchCars, AI cars that are controlled via wristwatches, in WatchCar Battle League competitions
