= Yo-kai Watch 4 =

2019 role-playing video game

- Developer: Level-5
- Publisher: Level-5
- Director: Ken Motomura
- Producer: Akihiro Hino
- Writer: Akihiro Hino
- Composer: Kenichiro Saigo
- Series: Yo-kai Watch
- Platforms: Nintendo Switch; PlayStation 4
- Release: Nintendo Switch: JP: June 20, 2019; CN: August 2, 2023; PlayStation 4: JP: December 5, 2019
- Genre: Action role-playing
- Modes: Single-player, multiplayer

Yo-kai Watch 4 (Note: Japanese: 妖怪ウォッチ4: ぼくらは同じ空を見上げている, Hepburn: Yōkai Wotchi Fō: Bokura wa Onaji Sora o Miagete Iru; lit. 'Yo-kai Watch 4: We're Looking Up at the Same Sky') is an action role-playing video game developed and published by Level-5 for the Nintendo Switch. It is the fourth installment in the main series of Yo-kai Watch video games. Unlike the preceding Yo-kai Watch 3, this was initially released only as a single version in Japan in June 2019. An enhanced version titled Yo-kai Watch 4++ (Note: 妖怪ウォッチ4++, Yōkai Wotchi Fō Pura Pura) was released for the Switch and PlayStation 4 in Japan in December 2019.

As with the other games in the series, the protagonist possesses the eponymous Yo-kai Watch, a device that allows them to see, befriend, and summon creatures called Yo-kai. Yo-kai Watch 4 is set in three distinct time periods. Characters from the first three main video games, including Keita "Keta" Amano and Fumika "Fumi-chan" Kodama, are in one time period. Another time period is set 30 years after the first three main video games, using characters from Yo-kai Watch Shadowside: Oni-ō no Fukkatsu and Yo-kai Watch Shadowside, including Natsume Amano, the daughter of Keita and Fumika. The final time period is set in the 1960s, approximately 60 years prior to the first three main video games, with characters from Yo-kai Watch: Forever Friends, including Shin Shimomachi.

== Gameplay ==
The game takes place in three separate worlds of future, present and past, each associated with one of the main characters: Natsume (30 years after the first three main games video), Keta (contemporaneous with the first three main video games), and Shin (60 years prior to the first three main video games).

Yo-kai Watch 4 introduced a new free-roaming 3D overworld movement system that is more akin to standard 3D RPG games, unlike the previous games that were from a top-down perspective. The game also implemented a new battle system where similar to other action role-playing games, players can directly control playable characters to battle enemies unlike where the previous games sent only befriended Yo-kai into battle. An active party can be formed with up to one human and three Yo-kai characters, and players may switch freely between human and Yo-kai characters during battle. Yo-kai characters in the party that are not controlled by the player will behave differently in battle depending on their personality, a system similar to previous Yo-kai Watch games. In addition, human characters absorb the element "Yo-ki" during the battle for redistribution, either to attack enemy Yo-kai, or to heal party members. Four characters from the Yo-kai Watch Shadowside anime series also appear in the game: Natsume Amano, her younger brother Keisuke Amano, Touma Tsukinami and Akinori Arihoshi. Gameplay footage was released at Tokyo Game Show 2018. Compared to the prior games in the series, which were all released for Nintendo 3DS, Yo-kai Watch 4 uses 3D rendering for both overworld exploration in Sakura New Town and battle scenes. To aid navigation, a Naviwoof (taking the appearance of a ghostly dog) will lead players to their destination.

== Development ==
Level-5 announced in April 2018 that Yo-kai Watch 4 was under development for Nintendo Switch, with a planned Japanese release in 2018. Although the game was initially scheduled for release in winter 2018, the release date slipped to spring 2019 for quality issues before being released in Japan on June 20, 2019.

=== Localization ===
During the Anime Expo in July 2019, Level-5 abby replied to a Q&A about a future Western release of Yo-kai Watch 4 and showed the Japanese trailer with English subtitles. Because the game's plot refers to concepts and details that were introduced in the Shadowside and Forever Friends films, which have not yet been given official English-language releases, the marketing company expressed an interest in localizing those films as well. However, as of October 2020, a combination of flagging sales for the series and Level-5's decision to shutter their North American operations, including Level-5 Abby, has led many commentators and journalists to bring in doubt of the possibility of a localization ever happening.

=== Yo-kai Watch 4++ ===
Level-5 announced that certain Yo-kai, a new map, and a multiplayer mode would be made available via downloadable unlocks by August 2019. Some of the downloadable content would require an additional purchase, while others were available as pre-sale bonuses for related items, such as tickets for the upcoming Eiga Yo-kai Gakuen Y: Neko wa Hero ni Nareru ka. The August 9 update 1.30 included sumo battles and a new yo-kai, Yamakasa.

An enhanced version named Yo-kai Watch 4++ was released for both Nintendo Switch and Sony PlayStation 4 on December 5, 2019, in Japan. 4++ includes new features and additions such as a new map and enemies, as well as a multiplayer mode, "Purapura Blasters". The content included in 4++ was also available for existing owners of the original game as a paid download. The release marked the first time a Yo-kai Watch game was released on another platform, the PlayStation 4. The release also added language options for traditional and simplified Chinese.

== Sales ==
Although it was the best-selling game in Japan during its initial week of release, Yo-kai Watch 4 had the worst sales in the series to date; with 150,721 copies sold between June 17 and June 23, 2019. During its second week, it was displaced by the debuts of Super Mario Maker 2 and Power Pros, selling an additional 40,376 copies for third place. It remained in third place the following week, with 19,407 copies sold. It sold 291,878 copies in Japan in the year 2019.

The 4++ rerelease of the game did even worse, selling only 10,333 copies in its first week at retail on Nintendo Switch alone, missing the Top 10 of that week's sales charts, and the PlayStation 4 version not even placing in the Top 30. The Nintendo Switch version remained in the Top 30 of weekly Japanese sales for only seven weeks, having sold a total of 60,890 copies by its exit.

== Reception ==
Reception

Review score
| Publication | Score |
|---|---|
| Famitsu | 37/40 |

Yo-kai Watch 4 was positively reviewed in Famitsu, scoring 37/40. The follow-up 4++ received a similarly positive score of 36/40 in Famitsu.
