= Yo-kai Watch! (2019 TV series) =

Japanese anime television show

- Key visual of the 2019 series

妖怪ウォッチ! (Yōkai Wotchi!)
- Genre: Action, supernatural, comedy
- Anime television series
- Directed by: Ryousuke Senbo
- Written by: Yoichi Kato
- Music by: Kenichiro Saigo
- Studio: OLM Team Inoue; Magic Bus
- Original network: TXN (TV Tokyo)
- English network: SEA: Animax Asia
- Original run: April 5, 2019 – December 20, 2019
- Episodes: 36

Yo-kai Watch! (妖怪ウォッチ！, Yōkai Wotchi!) is a 2019 animated television series. It is a reboot of the original Yo-kai Watch anime series co-produced by OLM and Magic Bus. It premiered on TXN on April 5, 2019. This is the third series based on Level 5's Yo-kai Watch franchise, the successor to Yo-kai Watch Shadowside anime series and the sequel to the original anime series.

It was announced on November 15, 2019, that Yo-kai Watch! would end on December 20, 2019. It was replaced with the anime series Yo-kai Watch Jam - Yo-kai Academy Y: Close Encounters of the N Kind on December 27 to continue the story of the most recent film, Yo-kai Watch Jam the Movie: Yo-kai Academy Y - Can a Cat Become A Hero?.

The series premiered on Animax Asia on April 24, 2019.

== Plot ==
The series is set after the events of the original anime series and before the events of the fourth film, with Wazzat wiping Nathan "Nate" Adams's memories clean. Whisper and Jibanyan removes him to restorer Nate's memories. New changes include Nate owning a Yo-kai Watch Arcane Model K and the use of Yo-kai Keystones. The show also retains its gag comedy and humor from the original series. The new series, which is more comedy focused than the original, introduces a new form of Yo-Kai, Onechanside. Yo-kai are summoned by inserting a Yo-Kai Keystone into the Yo-Kai Watch Arcane Model K and turning it leftwards while Onechanside Yo-kai are summoned by turning it rightwards.

== Anime ==
The opening theme is Kera Kera Ho Song (ケラケラホーのうた, Kerakerahou no uta) by Hiroki Maekawa, and the ending theme is Yo-kai Exercise No.1 ~Continue~ (ようかい体操第一 ～つづき～, Yōkai Taisō Daiichi -Tsuzuki-) by Kaede☆ which is the remix of the first ending of the original anime series.

No.	Title	Original release date
1	"Way Too Average Life"; Transliteration: "Futsū Sugiru Jinsei" (Japanese: フツーすぎる人生)	April 5, 2019
1	"Not-Average Life"; Transliteration: "Futsū Janai Jinsei" (Japanese: フツーじゃない人生)	April 5, 2019
1	"4-Komasan Urban Trap"; Transliteration: "Yon-Komasan "Tokai no Wana"" (Japanese: 4コマさん「都会の罠」)	April 5, 2019
2	"Yo-kai Bloominoko"; Transliteration: "Youkai Fukuryuu" (Japanese: 妖怪フクリュウ)	April 12, 2019
2	"Yo-kai Snobetty"; Transliteration: "Youkai Rii-fujin" (Japanese: 妖怪リー夫人)	April 12, 2019
2	"Geezer Wig Club: Lesson 1"; Transliteration: "Ossan-zura-bu Ressun 1" (Japanese: おっさんヅラ部 Lesson 1)	April 12, 2019
2	"4-Komasan: Stray Cat"; Transliteration: "Yon-Komasan "Suteneko-san"" (Japanese: 4コマさん「捨て猫さん」)	April 12, 2019
2	"The Journey Across Japan Searching for Komami! Harajuku"; Transliteration: "Nippon zenkoku koma mi sagashi no tabi! Harajuku-hen" (Japanese: ニッポン全国 コマみ探しの旅！原宿編)	April 12, 2019
3	"The Nyalking Dead: Yo-kai in Extreme Conditions Episode 1"; Transliteration: "Nyākingudeddo ~ kyokugen jōtai no Yōkai-tachi ~ episōdo 1" (Japanese: ニャーキングデッド ～極限状態の妖怪たち～ エピソード1)	April 19, 2019
3	"Yo-kai Shakey"; Transliteration: "Yōkai tenohira-gaeshi" (Japanese: 妖怪てのひらがえし)	April 19, 2019
3	"Geezer Wig Club: Lesson 2"; Transliteration: "Ossan-zura-bu Ressun 2" (Japanese: おっさんヅラ部 Lesson 2)	April 19, 2019
3	"4-Komasan: Shopping"; Transliteration: "4 Koma-san "o kaimono"" (Japanese: 4コマさん「お買い物」)	April 19, 2019
3	"The Journey Across Japan: Searching for Komami! Chinatown"; Transliteration: "Nippon zenkoku koma mi sagashi no tabi! Chūkamachi-hen" (Japanese: ニッポン全国 コマみ探しの旅！ 中華街編)	April 19, 2019
4	"Modern Money Snider"; Transliteration: "Gendai no okane naidā" (Japanese: 現代のお金ナイダー)	April 26, 2019
4	"Geezer Wig Club: Lesson 3"; Transliteration: "Lesson 3 Ossan-zura-bu Ressun 3" (Japanese: おっさんヅラ部 Lesson3)	April 26, 2019
4	"The Nya-king Dead: Yo-kai in Extreme Conditions Episode 2"; Transliteration: "Nyākingudeddo ~ kyokugen jōtai no Yōkai-tachi ~ episōdo 2" (Japanese: ニャーキングデッド ～極限状態の妖怪たち～ エピソード2)	April 26, 2019
4	"4 Komasan: Rattle"; Transliteration: "4 Koma-san "garagara"" (Japanese: 4コマさん「ガラガラ」)	April 26, 2019
4	"Yo-kai Watch Romance of the Three Kingdoms: The Fair"; Transliteration: "Yōkai Sangokushi sonoichi" (Japanese: 妖怪三国志 其ノ壱)	April 26, 2019
5	"Yo-kai Casanono"; Transliteration: "Youkai Motenusu" (Japanese: 妖怪モテヌス)	May 3, 2019
5	"The Nya-king Dead: Yo-kai in Extreme Conditions Episode 3"; Transliteration: "Nyākingudeddo ~ kyokugen jōtai no Yōkai-tachi ~ episōdo 3" (Japanese: ニャーキングデッド ～極限状態の妖怪たち～ エピソード3)	May 3, 2019
5	"4 Komasan: Carp Streamers"; Transliteration: "4 Koma-san "koinobori"" (Japanese: 4コマさん「鯉のぼり」)	May 3, 2019
5	"The Journey Across Japan: Searching for Komami! Ryogoku"; Transliteration: "Nippon zenkoku koma mi sagashi no tabi! Ryōgoku-hen" (Japanese: ニッポン全国 コマみ探しの旅！ 両国編)	May 3, 2019
6	"Yo-kai Siro"; Transliteration: "Yōkai Todorokijishi" (Japanese: 妖怪とどろき獅子)	May 10, 2019
6	"The Nya-king Dead: Yo-kai in Extreme Conditions Final Episode"; Transliteration: "Nyākingudeddo ~ kyokugen jōtaino Yōkai-tachi ~ episōdofainaru" (Japanese: ニャーキングデッド ～極限状態の妖怪たち～ エピソードファイナル)	May 10, 2019
6	"4 Komasan: Fashionable Sweets"; Transliteration: "4 Koma-san "oshare suītsu"" (Japanese: 4コマさん「おしゃれスイーツ」)	May 10, 2019
6	"The Journey Across Japan: Searching for Komami! Fujisan"; Transliteration: "Nippon zenkoku koma mi sagashi no tabi! Fujisan-hen" (Japanese: ニッポン全国 コマみ探しの旅！ 富士山編)	May 10, 2019
7	"Yo-kai Signiton"; Transliteration: "Yōkai Denjin" (Japanese: 妖怪でんじん)	May 17, 2019
7	"Full of Idols! Jibanyan's Performing Arts Office! Episode 1"; Transliteration: "Aidoru-ippai! Jibanyan geinō jimusho! Dai 1-wa" (Japanese: アイドルいっぱい！ジバニャン芸能事務所！ 第1話)	May 17, 2019
7	"4-Komasan: The Lost Things"; Transliteration: "4 Koma-san "otoshimono"" (Japanese: 4コマさん「おとしもの」)	May 17, 2019
7	"Yo-kai Martial Arts Association: Goku Orochi"; Transliteration: "Yōma ichi budō-kai "goku orochi"" (Japanese: 妖魔一武道会『極オロチ』)	May 17, 2019
8	"Yo-kai Stircrazy Stu"; Transliteration: "Yōkai Gyūjiru" (Japanese: 妖怪ギュウ汁)	May 24, 2019
8	"That Yo-kai is So Gnoisy"; Transliteration: "Ano Yōkai wa ima ~ Zashiki-warashi ~" (Japanese: あの妖怪は今 ～ざしきわらし～)	May 24, 2019
8	"4-Komasan: Automatic Door"; Transliteration: "4 Koma-san "jidō doa"" (Japanese: 4コマさん「自動ドア」)	May 24, 2019
8	"Full of Idols! Jibanyan's Performing Arts Office! Episode 2"; Transliteration: "Aidoru-ippai! Jibanyan geinō jimusho! Dai 2 wa" (Japanese: アイドルいっぱい！ジバニャン芸能事務所！ 第2話)	May 24, 2019
8	"Yo-kai Watch Romance of the Three Kingdoms"; Transliteration: "Yo-kai Sangokushi Sono Ni" (Japanese: 妖怪三国志 其ノ弐)	May 24, 2019
9	"Yo-Kai N'More"; Transliteration: "Yōkai Yametaishi" (Japanese: 妖怪やめたい師)	May 31, 2019
9	"Don't Stop the Farts!"; Transliteration: "Onara wo Tomeru na!" (Japanese: オナラを止めるな！)	May 31, 2019
9	"4-Komasan: Name"; Transliteration: "4-Komasan "Namae"" (Japanese: 4コマさん「名前」)	May 31, 2019
9	"Full of Idols! Jibanyan's Performing Arts Office! Episode 3"; Transliteration: "Aidoru ippai! Jibanyan geinō jimusho! Dai 3 wa" (Japanese: アイドルいっぱい！ ジバニャン芸能事務所！ 第3話)	May 31, 2019
9	"The Journey Across Japan Searching for Komami! Furano"; Transliteration: "Nippon zenkoku Komami Sagashi no Tabi! Furano-hen" (Japanese: ニッポン全国 コマみ探しの旅！ 富良野編)	May 31, 2019
10	"Yo-kai Liarbird"; Transliteration: "Youkai Shiragirisuzume" (Japanese: 妖怪シラ切りスズメ)	June 7, 2019
10	"Jibanyan and the Cherry Tree"; Transliteration: "Jibanyan to Sakura no Ki" (Japanese: ジバニャンと桜の木)	June 7, 2019
10	"4-Komasan: Say Cheese, Zura"; Transliteration: "4-Komasan "Hai, Chīzu zura"" (Japanese: 4コマさん「はい、チーズズラ」)	June 7, 2019
10	"Full of Idols! Jibanyan's Performing Arts Office! Final Episode"; Transliteration: "Aidoru ippai! Jibanyan geinō jimusho! Saishuukai" (Japanese: アイドルいっぱい！ ジバニャン芸能事務所！ 最終回)	June 7, 2019
10	"The Journey Across Japan Searching for Komami! Nikko"; Transliteration: "Nippon zenkoku Komami Sagashi no Tabi! Nikkou-hen" (Japanese: ニッポン全国 コマみ探しの旅！ 日光編)	June 7, 2019
11	"Yo-kai Compunzer"; Transliteration: "Yōkai Osuberi-sama" (Japanese: 妖怪おすべり様)	June 14, 2019
11	"Doctor F #1"; Transliteration: "Dokutaa F #1" (Japanese: ドクターF #1)	June 14, 2019
11	"4-Komasan: Bus"; Transliteration: "4-Komasan "Basu"" (Japanese: 4コマさん「バス」)	June 14, 2019
11	"The Journey Across Japan Searching for Komami! Mount Osore"; Transliteration: "Nippon zenkoku Komami Sagashi no Tabi! Osorezan-hen" (Japanese: ニッポン全国 コマみ探しの旅！ 恐山編)	June 14, 2019
12	"Yo-kai Shirokuma"; Transliteration: "Youkai Shirokuma" (Japanese: 妖怪しろく魔)	June 21, 2019
12	"Magical Girl Katie"; Transliteration: "Majokko Fumi-chan" (Japanese: 魔女っ子フミちゃん)	June 21, 2019
12	"4-Komasan: Plastic Umbrella"; Transliteration: "4-Komasan "Binīru Kasa"" (Japanese: 4コマさん「ビニール傘」)	June 21, 2019
12	"Doctor F #2"; Transliteration: "Dokutaa F #2" (Japanese: ドクターF #2)	June 21, 2019
12	"The Great Journey Across Japan Searching for Komami! Iga"; Transliteration: "Nippon zenkoku Komami Sagashi no Tabi! Iga-hen" (Japanese: ニッポン全国 コマみ探しの旅！ 伊賀編)	June 21, 2019
13	"Yo-kai Bananose"; Transliteration: "Youkai Nagabanana" (Japanese: 妖怪ナガバナナ)	June 28, 2019
13	"That Yo-kai is Now... Dandoodle"; Transliteration: "Ano youkai wa ima ~Ikemen ken~" (Japanese: あの妖怪は今 〜イケメン犬〜)	June 28, 2019
13	"4-Komasan: Massage Chair"; Transliteration: "4-Komasan "Massāji Chea"" (Japanese: 4コマさん「マッサージチェア」)	June 28, 2019
13	"Doctor F #3"; Transliteration: "Dokutaa F #3" (Japanese: ドクターF #3)	June 28, 2019
13	"Yo-kai of the Three Kingdoms: Part Three"; Transliteration: "Youkai Sankokushi Sono San" (Japanese: 妖怪三国志 其ノ参)	June 28, 2019
14	"Yo-kai Punkupine"; Transliteration: "Youkai Harī" (Japanese: 妖怪ハリー)	July 5, 2019
14	"Doctor F: Finale"; Transliteration: "Dokutaa F Fainaru" (Japanese: ドクターF ファイナル)	July 5, 2019
14	"4-Komasan: Looking for Things"; Transliteration: "4-Komasan "Sagashimono"" (Japanese: 4コマさん「さがしもの」)	July 5, 2019
14	"The Journey Across Japan Searching For Komami! Kyoto"; Transliteration: "Nippon zenkoku Komami Sagashi no Tabi! Kyotō-hen" (Japanese: ニッポン全国 コマみ探しの旅！ 京都編)	July 5, 2019
15	"Yo-kai Ballin"; Transliteration: "Youkai Tamanokoshi" (Japanese: 妖怪たまのこし)	July 12, 2019
15	"Section Chef Kousaku Jiba"; Transliteration: "Kachō Jiba kousaku" (Japanese: 課長ジバ耕作)	July 12, 2019
15	"4-Komasan Elevator"; Transliteration: "4-Komasan "Erebeitā"" (Japanese: 4コマさん「エレベーター」)	July 12, 2019
15	"No.1 in the Yo-kai Word Tournament: Rinne"; Transliteration: "Youma Ichi Budoukai "Rinne"" (Japanese: 妖魔一武道会『輪廻』)	July 12, 2019
16	"Yo-kai Snailspace"; Transliteration: "Youkai Maimaipeisu" (Japanese: 妖怪マイマイペース)	July 19, 2019
16	"Blizzaria's Summer Vacation"; Transliteration: "Fubukihime no Natsuyasumi" (Japanese: ふぶき姫のなつやすみ)	July 19, 2019
16	"4-Komasan Natto"; Transliteration: "4-Komasan "Nattou"" (Japanese: 4コマさん「納豆」)	July 19, 2019
16	"NEET Kousaku Jiba"; Transliteration: "Nīto Jiba Kousaku" (Japanese: ニートジバ耕作)	July 19, 2019
17	"Yo-kai Chippa"; Transliteration: "Youkai Rakutendō" (Japanese: 妖怪らくてん童)	July 26, 2019
17	"Summer Three-Game Match! Stag Beetle vs Rhinoceros Beetle"; Transliteration: "Natsu no Sanbonshōbu! Kabuto vs Kuwagata!" (Japanese: 夏の三本勝負！ カブトVSクワガタ！)	July 26, 2019
17	"4-Komasan Vending Machine"; Transliteration: "4-Komasan "Jidō hanbaiki"" (Japanese: 4コマさん「自動販売機」)	July 26, 2019
17	"President Jiba Kousaku"; Transliteration: "Shachō Jiba Kousaku" (Japanese: 社長ジバ耕作)	July 26, 2019
17	"Yo-kai of the Three Kingdoms: Part Four"; Transliteration: "Youkai Sankokushi Sono Yon" (Japanese: 妖怪三国志 其ノ四)	July 26, 2019
18	"Yo-kai Too-Much-To-Take"; Transliteration: "Yōkai Jigoku Mimizuku" (Japanese: 妖怪じごくミミズク)	August 2, 2019
18	"The Journey Across Japan Searching for Komami! Shōnan"; Transliteration: "Nippon zenkoku koma mi sagashi no tabi! Shōnan-hen" (Japanese: ニッポン全国 コマみ探しの旅！ 湘南編)	August 2, 2019
18	"Ba-Dump! Summer Camp Full of Yo-kai"; Transliteration: "Dokitsu! Yōkai darake no samā kyanpu" (Japanese: ドキッ！ 妖怪だらけのサマーキャンプ)	August 2, 2019
18	"4-Komasan Observation Diary"; Transliteration: "4-Komasan `kansatsu nikki'" (Japanese: 4コマさん「観察日記」)	August 2, 2019
19	"Geezer Wig Club: Lesson 4"; Transliteration: "Ossan-zura-bu Ressun Fo" (Japanese: 激情編 おっさんヅラ部)	August 9, 2019
19	"Yo-kai Machonyan"; Transliteration: "Yōkai Masukudonyān" (Japanese: 妖怪マスクドニャーン)	August 9, 2019
19	"That Yo-kai is Now... Spoilerina"; Transliteration: "Ano Yōkai wa ima ~Netabarerīna~" (Japanese: あの妖怪は今 ～ネタバレリーナ～)	August 9, 2019
19	"4-Komasan: Life Preserver"; Transliteration: "4-Komasan `uki wa'" (Japanese: 4コマさん「浮き輪」)	August 9, 2019
19	"The Journey Across Japan Searching for Komami! Miyako Island"; Transliteration: "Nippon zenkoku koma mi sagashi no tabi! Miyakojima-hen" (Japanese: ニッポン全国 コマみ探しの旅！ 宮古島編)	August 9, 2019
20	"The Enma Royal Family's Secret Treasure! The Coveted Black Dianyan!"; Transliteration: "Enma ōke no hihō! Nerawareta burakku daiya nyan!" (Japanese: エンマ王家の秘宝！狙われたブラックダイヤニャン！)	August 16, 2019
21	"Yo-kai Flengu"; Transliteration: "Yōkai Homura Tengu" (Japanese: 妖怪ほむら天狗)	August 23, 2019
21	"No.1 in the Yo-kai World Tournament: Black Dianyan"; Transliteration: "Yōma ichi budōkai "Burakku Daiya Nyan"" (Japanese: 妖魔一武道会『ブラックダイヤニャン』)	August 23, 2019
21	"Amy's Rudy"; Transliteration: "Emichan no akamaru" (Japanese: エミちゃんのアカマル)	August 23, 2019
21	"4-Komasan: PC"; Transliteration: "4-Komasan `Pasokon'" (Japanese: 4コマさん「パソコン」)	August 23, 2019
21	"Operation Noko Capture!"; Transliteration: "Tsuchinoko hokaku dai sakusen!" (Japanese: ツチノコ捕獲大作戦！)	August 23, 2019
22	"Yo-kai Cutter-nah-nah"; Transliteration: "Yōkai Zanbara Katana" (Japanese: 妖怪ザンバラ刀)	August 30, 2019
22	"Homework Impossible"; Transliteration: "Shukudai inposshiburu" (Japanese: 宿題インポッシブル)	August 30, 2019
22	"4-Komasan: Penguin"; Transliteration: "4-Komasan `Pengin'" (Japanese: 4コマさん「ペンギン」)	August 30, 2019
22	"Operation Noko Capture! 2"; Transliteration: "Tsuchinoko hokaku dai sakusen! 2" (Japanese: ツチノコ捕獲大作戦！2)	August 30, 2019
22	"Yo-kai of the Three Kingdoms: Part Five"; Transliteration: "Yōkai Sangokushi no go" (Japanese: 妖怪三国志 其ノ伍)	August 30, 2019
23	"Yo-kai Unbearaboy"; Transliteration: "Yōkai baddo bōya" (Japanese: 妖怪バッド坊や)	September 6, 2019
23	"High and Yo Prologue: Saitei High School"; Transliteration: "HIGH & PROLOGUE sai tei kōkō" (Japanese: HIGH&妖 PROLOGUE 最帝高校)	September 6, 2019
23	"4-Komasan: Toothpaste"; Transliteration: "4-Komasan `Hamigaki'" (Japanese: 4コマさん「歯みがき」)	September 6, 2019
23	"The Journey Across Japan Searching for Komami! Aomori"; Transliteration: "Nippon zenkoku koma mi sagashi no tabi! Aomori-hen" (Japanese: ニッポン全国 コマみ探しの旅！ 青森編)	September 6, 2019
24	"Yo-kai Flash T. Cash"; Transliteration: "Yōkai Burujowa G" (Japanese: 妖怪ブルジョワG)	September 13, 2019
24	"High and Yo Episode 2: Sweet Association"; Transliteration: "HIGH & EPISODE 2 amai mon rengōkai" (Japanese: HIGH&妖 EPISODE2 甘いもん連合会)	September 13, 2019
24	"4-Komasan: Map"; Transliteration: "4-Komasan `Chizu'" (Japanese: 4コマさん「地図」)	September 13, 2019
24	"The Journey Across Japan Searching for Komami! Toyosu"; Transliteration: "Nippon zenkoku koma mi sagashi no tabi! Toyosu-hen" (Japanese: ニッポン全国 コマみ探しの旅！ 豊洲編)	September 13, 2019
25	"Yo-kai Fishpicable"; Transliteration: "Yōkai Kiraigyo" (Japanese: 妖怪キライギョ)	September 20, 2019
25	"High & Yo Episode 3: Koma Miya Brothers"; Transliteration: "HIGH & EPISODE 3 koma miya kyōdai" (Japanese: HIGH & 妖 EPISODE3 コマ宮兄弟)	September 20, 2019
25	"4-Komasan:"; Transliteration: "4-Komasan `Manpokei'" (Japanese: 4コマさん「万歩計」)	September 20, 2019
25	"The Journey Across Japan Searching for Komami! Nagasaki"; Transliteration: "Nippon zenkoku koma mi sagashi no tabi! Nagasaki-hen" (Japanese: ニッポン全国 コマみ探しの旅！ 長崎編)	September 20, 2019
26	"Yo-kai Mermother"; Transliteration: "Yōkai Izanami" (Japanese: 妖怪イザナミ)	September 27, 2019
26	"No.1 in the Yo-kai World Tournament: Jashin Kachi Kachi"; Transliteration: "Yōma ichi budōkai "jashin kachikachi"" (Japanese: 妖魔一武道会『邪神カチカチ』)	September 27, 2019
26	"High and Yo Episode 4: Whisper Family"; Transliteration: "HIGH & EPISODE 4 Uisupā ikka" (Japanese: HIGH & 妖 EPISODE4 ウイスパー一家)	September 27, 2019
26	"4-Komasan: Koromogae"; Transliteration: "4-Komasan `Koromogae'" (Japanese: 4コマさん「ころもがえ」)	September 27, 2019
27	"Yo-kai Devourer"; Transliteration: "Yōkai Inochitori" (Japanese: 妖怪いのちとり)	October 4, 2019
27	"The Journey Across Japan Searching for Komami! Ehime"; Transliteration: "Nippon zenkoku koma mi sagashi no tabi! Ehime-hen" (Japanese: ニッポン全国 コマみ探しの旅！ 愛媛編)	October 4, 2019
27	"High and Yo Episode 5: Robo Animals"; Transliteration: "HIGH & EPISODE 5 robo animaruzu" (Japanese: HIGH & 妖 EPISODE5 ロボアニマルズ)	October 4, 2019
27	"4-Komasan: Buffet"; Transliteration: "4-Komasan `Baikingu'" (Japanese: 4コマさん「バイキング」)	October 4, 2019
28	"yo-kai Sorrypus"; Transliteration: "Yōkai Gomendako" (Japanese: 妖怪ゴメンダコ)	October 11, 2019
28	"Yo-kai of the Three Kingdoms: Part Six"; Transliteration: "Yōkai Sangokushi no roku" (Japanese: 妖怪三国志 其ノ六)	October 11, 2019
28	"High and Yo Episode 6: Red Boys"; Transliteration: "HIGH & EPISODE 6 aka n bōizu" (Japanese: HIGH & 妖 EPISODE6 赤んBOYS)	October 11, 2019
28	"4-Komasan: Capsule Machine"; Transliteration: "4-Komasan `Gasha'" (Japanese: 4コマさん「ガシャ」)	October 11, 2019
29	"Yo-kai Smogling"; Transliteration: "Yōkai Koenra" (Japanese: 妖怪こえんら)	October 18, 2019
29	"High and Yo: Final War"; Transliteration: "HIGH & FINAL WAR" (Japanese: HIGH & 妖 FINAL WAR)	October 18, 2019
29	"4-Komasan: Replacement"; Transliteration: "4-Komasan `Irekawari'" (Japanese: 4コマさん「いれかわり」)	October 18, 2019
29	"The Journey Across Japan Searching for Komami! Shirakawa Village"; Transliteration: "Nippon zenkoku koma mi sagashi no tabi! Shirakawagō-hen" (Japanese: ニッポン全国 コマみ探しの旅！ 白川郷編)	October 18, 2019
30	"Yo-kai Urnaconda"; Transliteration: "Yōkai Orochi no tsubo" (Japanese: 妖怪大蛇のツボ)	October 25, 2019
30	"Protect Endangered Yo-kai! File 1"; Transliteration: "Mamore! Zetsumetsu kigu Yōkai! FILE 1" (Japanese: まもれ！ 絶滅危惧妖怪！ FILE 1)	October 25, 2019
30	"4-Komasan: Toilet"; Transliteration: "4-Komasan `Toire'" (Japanese: 4コマさん「トイレ」)	October 25, 2019
30	"The Journey Across Japan Searching for Komami! Our House"; Transliteration: "Nippon zenkoku koma mi sagashi no tabi! Oratachi no o uchi hen" (Japanese: ニッポン全国 コマみ探しの旅！ オラたちのおうち編)	October 25, 2019
31	"Yo-kai Hairum Scarum"; Transliteration: "Yōkai o toroshi" (Japanese: 妖怪おとろし)	November 1, 2019
31	"No.1 in the Yo-kai World Tournament: Koma Kaachan"; Transliteration: "Yōma ichi budōkai "Komakāchan"" (Japanese: 妖魔一武道会『コマ母ちゃん』)	November 1, 2019
31	"Protect Endangered Yo-kai! File 2"; Transliteration: "Mamore! Zetsumetsu kigu yōkai! FILE 2" (Japanese: まもれ！ 絶滅危惧妖怪！ FILE 2)	November 1, 2019
31	"4-Komasan: Halloween"; Transliteration: "4-Komasan `Harōin'" (Japanese: 4コマさん「ハロウィン」)	November 1, 2019
32	"Yo-kai Pookivil"; Transliteration: "Yōkai Ura Kyunta" (Japanese: 妖怪裏キュン太)	November 8, 2019
32	"The Journey Across Japan Searching for Komami! Conclusion"; Transliteration: "Nippon Zenkoku Koma mi Sagashi no Tabi! Kanketsu-hen" (Japanese: ニッポン全国 コマみ探しの旅！ 完結編)	November 8, 2019
32	"Protect Endangered Yo-kai! File 3"; Transliteration: "Mamore! Zetsumetsu Kigu Yōkai! FILE 3" (Japanese: まもれ！ 絶滅危惧妖怪！ FILE 3)	November 8, 2019
32	"4-Komasan: Today's Recommendation"; Transliteration: "4-Komasan `Honjitsu no Osusume'" (Japanese: 4コマさん「本日のオススメ」)	November 8, 2019
33	"Yo-kai Wobblewok"; Transliteration: "Yōkai Dondoro" (Japanese: 妖怪どんどろ)	November 15, 2019
33	"USAPyon's Onechanside Fever!"; Transliteration: "USA Pyon no Wan Chan Saido Fībā!" (Japanese: USAピョンのワンチャンサイドフィーバー！)	November 15, 2019
33	"4-Komasan: Zura"; Transliteration: "4-Komasan `Zura'" (Japanese: 4コマさん「ズラ」)	November 15, 2019
33	"Yokai of the Three Kingdoms: Part Seven"; Transliteration: "Yōkai Sangokushi no Nana" (Japanese: 妖怪三国志 其ノ七)	November 15, 2019
34	"Yo-kai Abodabat"; Transliteration: "Yōkai Toji Koumori" (Japanese: 妖怪トジコウモリ)	November 29, 2019
34	"Komami-ssion Impossible! Part 1"; Transliteration: "Koma Misshon Inposshiburu! Zenpen" (Japanese: コマみッション・インポッシブル！ 前編)	November 29, 2019
34	"One Evening Left for Mr. Crabbycat"; Transliteration: "Ichiya Kagiri no Nyanpachi Sensei" (Japanese: 一夜限りのニャンパチ先生)	November 29, 2019
34	"4-Komadan: Beanstalk"; Transliteration: "4-Komasan `Mame no Ki'" (Japanese: 4コマさん「豆の木」)	November 29, 2019
35	"Yo-kai Ghostess"; Transliteration: "Yōkai Itareri Tsuku Seri" (Japanese: 妖怪いたれりつくせり)	December 13, 2019
35	"Whisper, Becoming a Classic Yo-kai"; Transliteration: "Wisupā Koten Yōkai ni Naru no Maki" (Japanese: ウィスパー 古典妖怪になるの巻)	December 13, 2019
35	"4-Komasan: Present"; Transliteration: "4-Komasan `Purezento'" (Japanese: 4コマさん「プレゼント」)	December 13, 2019
35	"Komami-ssion Impossible: Part 2"; Transliteration: "Koma Misshon Inposshiburu! Kōhen" (Japanese: コマみッション・インポッシブル！ 後編)	December 13, 2019
36	"Jibanyan is Santa Claus"; Transliteration: "Jibanyan ga Santa Kurōsu" (Japanese: ジバニャンがサンタクロース)	December 20, 2019
36	"No.1 in the Yo-kai World Tournament: Lord Enma"; Transliteration: "Yōma Ichi Budōkai "Enma Daiō"" (Japanese: 妖魔一武道会『エンマ大王』)	December 20, 2019
36	"4-Komadan: Panel Shortage"; Transliteration: "4-Komasan `Koma Fusoku'" (Japanese: 4コマさん「コマ不足」)	December 20, 2019
36	"10004-Panel Komasan: Spectacular"; Transliteration: "10004 Komasan "Chōdaisaku"" (Japanese: 10004コマさん「超大作」)	December 20, 2019
Note: This is the final episode of Yo-kai Watch!.
