= Yo-kai Watch Jam: Yo-kai Academy Y =

2020 video game

- Promotional art depicting the game's main characters and the Y Academy
- Developer: Level-5
- Publisher: Level-5
- Composers: Kenichiro Saigo; Tomohito Nishiura
- Series: Yo-kai Watch
- Platforms: Nintendo Switch; PlayStation 4
- Release: Nintendo Switch: JP: August 13, 2020; PlayStation 4: JP: October 29, 2020
- Genre: Role-playing
- Modes: Single-player, multiplayer

Yo-kai Watch Jam - Yo-kai Academy Y: Yeah-Yeah School Life, (Note: Japanese: 妖怪学園Y ～ワイワイ学園生活～ - 妖怪ウォッチ シリーズ) also known as Y School Heroes: Bustlin' School Life, is a 2020 role-playing game developed and published by Level-5 for the Nintendo Switch and PlayStation 4. A spin-off installment in the Yo-kai Watch series, Yo-kai Watch Jam: Yo-kai Academy Y focuses on Jinpei Jiba, a student at the fictitious Y Academy, who investigates mysteries occurring in the academy and surrounding areas. He is also joined by his friends, who are among the playable characters.

Yo-kai Watch Jam: Yo-kai Academy Y was received positively by critics, who praised the game's combat system, environment, and school life mode, due to its routine feeling and open world-like style.

== Gameplay ==
A typical battle in the game

Yo-kai Watch Jam: Yo-kai Academy Y is a role-playing game that focuses on Jinpei Jiba as he attends Y Academy, an elite boarding school and the main setting of the Yo-kai Watch Jam: Yo-kai Academy Y anime series. Yo-kai Watch Jam: Yo-kai Academy Y's main gameplay occurs during "school life", which takes place during the day at Y Academy as the player attempts to raise their popularity by receiving "Likes", which can be obtained through solving fellow students' quests. During school life, players can also befriend other students and join clubs.

Yo-kai Watch Jam: Yo-kai Academy Y has a combat system that is drastically different from the core three mainline Yo-kai Watch games, with battles happening in real-time. During battles, players can transform into the Yo-kai Heroes, which makes the players stronger.

== Development and release ==
Yo-kai Academy Y was developed and published by Level-5, who had developed and published other Yo-kai Watch games. The game is based on the Yo-kai Watch Jam: Yo-kai Academy Y: Close Encounters of the N Kind anime series, whose first season was ongoing at the time of the game's release. Development of Yo-kai Watch Jam: Yo-kai Academy Y was prioritized over Inazuma Eleven: Victory Road, due to Level-5 wanting Victory Road to be "a hit".

The game was first revealed by Level-5 CEO Akihiro Hino on Twitter in December 2019, and was officially announced in the March 2020 issue of CoroCoro Comic. Further details were unveiled in the lead-up to the game's release. A demo for the game was released on the Nintendo eShop on August 3, 2020.

Yo-kai Academy Y was released on August 13, 2020, on the Nintendo Switch, and on the PlayStation 4 on October 29. The game was released physically on December 17.

== Reception and sales ==
Reception

Review score
| Publication | Score |
|---|---|
| Famitsu | 35/40 |

Yo-kai Academy Y received generally favorable reviews from critics, who praised the game's combat and school mode. Akiru Miyashita, writing for 4Gamer.net, stated that Yo-kai Academy Y was his favorite entry in the Yo-kai Watch series, due to the game's open world-like environment and combat system, which he opined had a "good tempo".

The game's school environment was received positively by critics. Namco Kushida of Famitsu described it as a "miniature garden", writing that she could "not help but patrol every corner". Totsuka expressed that going to and from school felt routine. Miyashita also enjoyed the routine feeling of school life, calling it "comfortable".

The combat system was also received positively. Keiichi Totsuka of Famitsu wrote that the combat system was accessible to newcomers of the Yo-kai Watch series, comparing the system to that of the Yo-kai Watch Blasters series. Gigolo Ashida of Famitsu appreciated the Yo-kai Hero mechanic, due to it being a "good accent". Amemiya, also of Famitsu, criticized how the game uses a chibi art style during battles, as he felt it makes it harder to see what's happening.

Yo-kai Academy Y sold over 3,000 copies on the Nintendo Switch in its first three days of release, making it the 25th best-selling video game in the week of August 10. In late December 2020, Yo-kai Academy Y was announced to have sold over 42,000 copies on the Nintendo Switch.
