= Yo-kai Watch Shadowside =

2018 anime show

- 妖怪ウォッチ シャドウサイド
- Genre: Action, supernatural
- Created by: Level-5
- Written by: Yōichi Katō
- Directed by: Fumiya Hōjō
- Music by: Kenichiro Saigo
- Country of origin: Japan
- Original language: Japanese
- No. of episodes: 49

Production
- Animator: OLM Team Inoue
- Production companies: TV Tokyo; Dentsu; OLM

Original release
- Network: TXN (TV Tokyo)
- Release: April 13, 2018 – March 29, 2019

Yo-kai Watch Shadowside (Japanese: 妖怪ウォッチ シャドウサイド, Hepburn: Yōkai Wotchi Shadōsaido) is a supernatural anime series produced by OLM. It is the follow-up to the 2017 film Yo-kai Watch Shadowside: Oni-ō no Fukkatsu and the successor to the original Yo-kai Watch anime series, originally based on the games created by Level-5. Yōichi Katō returned to officially direct and write the anime alongside new staff. It aired on all TXN Stations in Japan from April 13, 2018, to March 29, 2019. It was replaced by the 2019 Yo-kai Watch! anime series as direct sequel in its timeslot.

Just like the movie before it, the anime series takes a darker and more mature approach to the franchise, focusing on story-driven drama and conflict, unlike the original series' comedic and segmented approach.

== Plot ==
Taking place after the events of the fourth film, the series centers on Keisuke Amano, Natsume Amano's younger brother who doesn't believe in supernatural phenomena. But as he notices his sister frequently comes back home late, he decides to stalk her, only to find out she is running a Yo-kai Detective Agency with her friends Touma and Akinori to investigate supernatural phenomena. With their secret revealed to him, Summer decides to let him tag along in her activities as they investigate Yo-kai phenomena and take on evil Yo-kai to maintain the city's peace.

Meanwhile, Shutendoji, the one who had planned the Onimaro invasion, as seen in the fourth film's epilogue, along with his Yo-kai bodyguard Douketsu, search for the "Princess" in their human disguises while observing the Yo-kai Detective Agency.

== Production ==
Before the reveal of Shadowside, the original anime saw a decline back in 2017 due to staggeringly low sales of later games in the main series and falling ratings for the first anime. The series was conceived after the production of the film, and was officially revealed in the March 2018 issue of Coro Coro Comic as the film serves as a prequel to the anime and the original anime series following the reported drop of interest to the IP. The anime, like the film that preceded it, follows a much darker route in order to gain interest from older viewers. Alongside the returning characters, two new Yo-kai designs have been revealed. Alongside the new designs, the characters of the film have different voice actors as well. The official promo video was shown in Anime Japan 2018, which details the series's plot.

== Cast ==
- ケースケ - 戸松遥
- ナツメ - 悠木碧
- トウマ - 長谷川芳明
- アキノリ - 田村睦心
- ウィスパー - 関智一
- ジバニャン - 黒田崇矢
- ミッチー - 小野坂昌也

== Media ==
=== Anime ===
The anime officially premiered on all TXN stations in Japan, including TV Tokyo and TV Osaka on April 13, 2018, replacing the original Yo-kai Watch anime series in its timeslot, with the first and second episode premiering on the same day as a one-hour special. The first opening theme is titled "Toki o Matou" (時を待とう, Toki o matou; "Waiting for the Time") by Hard Birds while the first ending theme is titled "Funky Boogie Buba" (ファンキー・ブギブバー, Fankī Bugi Bubā) by King Cream Soda. The opening and ending themes were changed on October 5, 2018, to "Susume Shounen! Hyui Hyu" (進め少年!ヒューイヒュー, Susume Shounen! Hyui Hyu; "Go Young Boy! Hyui Hyu") by Hard Birds and "Oyasumi Sanka" "Holiday Hymn" (お休み賛歌) by King Cream Soda.

Episode list
| No. | Title | Original release date |
|---|---|---|
| 1 | "Phantom Gangleader" "Bōrei banchō" (亡霊番長) | April 13, 2018 |
| 2 | "The Bicycle Ridden by the Dead" "Shisha no noru jitensha" (死者の乗る自転車) | April 13, 2018 |
| 3 | "Redhead the Plunder Demon" "Ryakudatsuma reddoheddo" (略奪魔 レッドヘッド) | April 20, 2018 |
| 4 | "A Wasteful Man" "Mottanai-otoko" (もったいない男) | April 27, 2018 |
| 5 | "Mannequin in Love" "Koisuru Jindaimokei" (恋する人体模型) | May 4, 2018 |
| 6 | "Laughing Dogman" "Warau Dogguman" (わらうドッグマン) | May 11, 2018 |
| 7 | "Kaosake-onna" "Kaosake on'na" (顔さけ女) | May 18, 2018 |
| 8 | "Al's Rebellion" "Ō no hanran" (オーの反乱) | May 25, 2018 |
| 9 | "It's Called the Man-eating Tuna" "Hito-gui maguro to yobarete" (人食いマグロと呼ばれて) | June 1, 2018 |
| 10 | "The Dreadful Joker the Ripper" "Senritsu no kirisaki jōkā" (戦慄の切裂きジョーカー) | June 8, 2018 |
| 11 | "I am a Cat Yo-kai" "Ore-sama wa neko yōkaidearu" (オレさまはネコ妖怪である) | June 15, 2018 |
| 12 | "Touma Captured" "Toraware no Tōma" (捕らわれのトウマ) | June 22, 2018 |
| 13 | "The Mystery of Prayer Mountain" "Inori yama no kaiki" (祈り山の怪奇) | June 29, 2018 |
| 14 | "Fudou Myouou, Evil and Heavenly" "Fudōmyōō yokoshima to ten" (不動明王邪と天) | July 6, 2018 |
| 15 | "A Beautiful Girl you only see every One Hundred Thousand Years" "Jū man-nen ni hitori no bishōjo" (十万年にひとりの美少女) | July 13, 2018 |
| 16 | "Dangerous Sea Bathing" "Abunai Kaisuiyoku" (危ない海水浴) | July 20, 2018 |
| 17 | "The Cursed Fox and Table Turning" "Tatari Kitsune to Kokkuri-san" (たたり狐とコックリさん) | July 27, 2018 |
| 18 | "Face Thief" "Kao Dorobou" (顔どろぼう) | August 3, 2018 |
| 19 | "The Counterattack's Cicada Finale" "Gyakushū no Semi Fainaru" (逆襲の蝉ファイナル) | August 10, 2018 |
| 20 | "The Illusionary Screen 0" "Maboroshi no Zero-ban Sukurīn" (幻の0番スクリーン) | August 17, 2018 |
| 21 | "Resurrection! Kenbumajin Suzaku" "Fukkatsu! Kenbumajin Suzaku" (復活！剣武魔神朱雀) | August 24, 2018 |
| 22 | "Touma and the Piece of the Oni King" "Tōma to Oniō no Kakera" (トウマと鬼王のかけら) | August 31, 2018 |
| 23 | "Doctor C's Dark Medical Records" "Dokutā C no yami karute" (ドクターCの闇カルテ) | September 7, 2018 |
| 24 | "Dreaming Flower Poncho" "Yumemiru Hana Poncho" (夢見るハナぽんちょ) | September 14, 2018 |
| 25 | "Farewell Micchy" "Saraba Micchii" (さらば、ミッチー) | September 21, 2018 |
| 26 | "The Demonic Swallow-Whole Toilet" "Akuma no marunomi toire" (悪魔の丸呑みトイレ) | September 28, 2018 |
| 27 | "Wandering Komajiro" "Samayoeru Komajirou" (さまよえるコマじろう) | October 5, 2018 |
| 28 | "The Cursed AI Assistant" "Noroi no AI Ashisutanto" (呪いのAIアシスタント) | October 12, 2018 |
| 29 | "The Bloody Clover of Tragedy" "Higeki no buraddikurōbā" (悲劇のブラッディクローバー) | October 19, 2018 |
| 30 | "Ayame Disappears" "Ayame chiru" (アヤメ散る) | October 26, 2018 |
| 31 | "A Fierce Fight! Suzaku vs. Genbu" "Kettō! Suzaku VS Genbu" (決闘！朱雀 VS 玄武) | November 2, 2018 |
| 32 | "The Life-Eating Jorougumo" "Inochi o kurau jorōgumo" (命を喰らう女郎蜘蛛) | November 9, 2018 |
| 33 | "Hasty Satan Claus" "Awatenbō no Satan Kurōsu" (慌てん坊のサタンクロース) | November 16, 2018 |
| 34 | "The Yo-kai-only Yo-kai Detective Team" "Yōkai dake no Yōkai Tantei-dan" (妖怪だけの妖怪探偵団) | November 30, 2018 |
| 35 | "The Weeping Ballet Shoes" "Susurinaku Baree Shūzu" (すすり泣くバレエシューズ) | December 14, 2018 |
| 36 | "Shadowside Christmas" "Shadousaido Kurisumasu" (シャドウサイドクリスマス) | December 21, 2018 |
| 37 | "The Princess is in That Place" "Hime wa son'nani aru" (姫はそこにいる) | December 28, 2018 |
| 38 | "The Awaited Person Will Come" "Machibito, Kitaru" (待ち人、来たる) | January 11, 2019 |
| 39 | "The Horse Man of the Candy Shop" "Dagashi-ya no Uma-otoko" (駄菓子屋のウマ男) | January 18, 2019 |
| 40 | "Looking back, Dark Knight" "Furikaereba Ankoku-kishi" (振り返れば暗黒騎士) | January 25, 2019 |
| 41 | "The Alluring Bunny Trap" "Miwaku no Banī Torappu" (魅惑のバニートラップ) | February 1, 2019 |
| 42 | "Bitter Valentine's Day" "Urami no Barentain" (怨みのバレンタイン) | February 8, 2019 |
| 43 | "Douketsu, Parting with the Blaze" "Dōketsu, Honō no Ketsubestu" (洞潔、炎の決別) | February 15, 2019 |
| 44 | "Enma and the Lost Castle" "Enma to Ushinawareta Shiro" (エンマと失われた城) | February 22, 2019 |
| 45 | "Byakko's Trial! Touma vs. Haruya" "Byakko no Shiren! Touma vs. Haruya" (白虎の試練!トウマVSハルヤ) | March 1, 2019 |
| 46 | "Kaira Fallen into Darkness" "Yami ni Ochita Kaira" (闇に堕ちたカイラ) | March 8, 2019 |
| 47 | "Bonds Back to Back" "Senaka, Awase no Kizuna" (背中合わせの絆) | March 15, 2019 |
| 48 | "Truth about Spirit" "Supiritto no Shinjitsu" (スピリットの真実) | March 22, 2019 |
| 49 | "The Tale and the End of It" "Shinwa Sono Hate ni" (神話 その果てに) | March 29, 2019 |
Note: This is the final episode of Yo-kai Watch Shadowside.

=== Video game ===
Yo-kai Watch 4 was developed and published by Level-5 and it has been released on the Nintendo Switch on 20 June 2019 in Japan. The game is set on an alternative timeline to the anime, as several events that occur in the anime occur differently in the games.
