= Yo-kai Watch: Wibble Wobble =

2015 video game

- Official artwork
- Developer: NHN PlayArt Corporation
- Publisher: Level-5
- Series: Yo-kai Watch
- Platforms: iOS; Android
- Release: JP: October 21, 2015; NA/AU: March 24, 2016; EU: March 30, 2017
- Genre: Puzzle
- Mode: Single-player

Yo-kai Watch: Wibble Wobble (Note: Released in Japan as Yōkai Wotchi Puni-puni (Japanese: 妖怪ウォッチ ぷにぷに)) is a mobile puzzle spin-off title to the Yo-kai Watch video game series. It was released in Japan on October 21, 2015, and then was released worldwide in March 2016 and 2017. As announced on April 2, 2018, the international versions of the game were permanently shut down on May 31, 2018.

== Gameplay ==
A screenshot of the player fighting Komasan (left) and Komajiro (right) on the first special stage of the game.

Yo-kai Watch: Wibble Wobble is a puzzle game and sees the player matching 2 or more matching Wib Wobs (Yo-kai) to make bigger Wib Wobs, which, when popped (clicked), deal damage, with the damage depending on the size of the Wib Wob. Every Yo-kai has a Soultimate meter that increases every time a Wib Wob of that Yo-kai is popped. When the Soultimate meter is full, the Yo-kai can perform a "Soultimate move", which will aid the player in battle in some way.

The game would also often hold events that would feature unique characters, locations, and or items.

== Development ==
The Japanese release of the game was first announced on April 7, 2015 at a product presentation held at the Tokyo Dome City Hall. The game was later delayed from summer 2015 to October 2015. The English release of the game was first announced later on March 11, 2016, by the game's publisher, Level-5, via a trailer on the official Yo-kai Watch YouTube channel.

== Reception ==
Reception

Aggregate score
Aggregator	Score
Metacritic	83/100 (Note: Based on 6 reviews.)

Review scores
Publication	Score
Gamezebo	4/5
TouchArcade	4.5/5

Yo-kai Watch: Wibble Wobble received "generally favorable" reviews from critics, receiving a 61/100 score on review aggregator Metacritic.

In a review for TouchArcade, Chris Carter criticized the game's story, difficulty, and the Spirit feature, a feature that makes the player need to wait before they play levels (which can be bypassed by spending in-game money), however, he praised how the game "captures the essence" of the original TV-show and how the game rewards skill. Gamezebo's Rob Rich praised how the game's characters were "adorable", the amount of Yo-kai to unlock, and how progression "never stops", but criticized the gameplay for being confusing and also noted that the game's difficulty increases early in the game, making grinding necessary.

=== Sales ===
On March 11, 2016, the Japanese release of the game, Yo-kai Watch: Puni Puni, was the 28th top-grossing app for iOS in Japan. In December 2016, the English releases of the game surpassed 1 million downloads. On March 22, 2017, the game had achieved over 10 million downloads worldwide. As of January 2019, the Japanese release of Wibble Wobble had surpassed 14 million downloads since its launch in October 2015.
