= Yo-kai Watch Blasters =

- North American cover art for Red Cat Corps
- Developer: Level-5
- Publishers: JP: Level-5; WW: Nintendo
- Director: Ken Motomura
- Producer: Akihiro Hino
- Programmers: Yuji Mori; Tetsuo Mori
- Artists: Takuzo Nagano; Miho Tanaka; Nobuyuki Yanai
- Writers: Kohei Azuma; Akihiro Hino; Yoichi Kato
- Composer: Kenichiro Saigo
- Series: Yo-kai Watch
- Platform: Nintendo 3DS
- Release: JP: July 11, 2015; WW: September 7, 2018
- Genre: Action role-playing
- Modes: Single-player, multiplayer

Yo-kai Watch Blasters (Note: Known in Japan as Yo-kai Watch Busters (Japanese: 妖怪ウォッチバスターズ, Hepburn: Yōkai Wotchi Basutāzu)) is a role-playing video game developed and published by Level-5 for the Nintendo 3DS. Blasters was originally released in two versions, named Red Cat Corps (Note: Known in Japan as Yo-kai Watch Busters Akaneko-dan (Japanese: 妖(よう)怪(かい)ウォッチバスターズ 赤(あか)猫(ねこ)団(だん), Hepburn: Yōkai Wotchi Basutāzu Akaneko-dan, lit. Yokai Watch Busters Red Cat Squad)) and White Dog Squad. (Note: Known in Japan as Yo-kai Watch Busters Shiroinu-tai (Japanese: 妖(よう)怪(かい)ウォッチバスターズ 白(しろ)犬(いぬ)隊(たい), Hepburn: Yōkai Wotchi Basutāzu Shiroinu-tai, lit. Yokai Watch Busters White Dog Team)) The game is a spin-off based on the Blasters mini-game in the main series game Yo-kai Watch 2, and was released in Japan in July 2015 and worldwide by Nintendo in September 2018. Human characters are noticeably absent from gameplay, and players control Yo-kai in a beat 'em up action style instead.

The story follows Jibanyan and his Blasters Team in stopping Yo-kai shenanigans. Players tackle various missions and bosses and befriend new Yo-kai in the process. The game spoofs the Ghostbusters franchise, and is named "Busters" in the Japanese and Korean releases. However, due to copyright and licensing issues, the International releases were renamed, and most of the overt references to Ghostbusters were removed (including notable spoofs of the Ectomobile and Stay Puft Marshmallow Man, among others).

== Gameplay ==
In Yo-kai Watch Blasters, the player plays as Yo-kai; there are only four medal slots in Blasters, in contrast to the six slots in the main series games. The game has four types of missions: Story, Patrol, Boss Rush (Big Boss in English versions), and True Challenge Missions. In all missions, players collect Oni Orbs, an in-game currency that has many uses, including leveling up Yo-kai, buying items, making and upgrading equipment, and using the Oni Crank-a-kai. The Crank-a-kai allows the player to spend coin items to have a chance at getting rare items and Yo-kai.

In Story Missions, the player progresses through the story to become the best Blaster possible. There are two types of Story Missions: Main Missions and Sub Missions. As the name suggests, Main Missions are essential to completing the story. Sub Missions are generally optional, though some are essential to progress in the main story.

In Patrol Missions, the player explores different towns of their choice to befriend Yo-kai and clear small missions called Mini Missions, which reward Oni Orbs.

In Big Boss Missions, the player can re-fight bosses previously defeated in Story Missions. Each Big Boss Mission has a selectable difficulty level: Normal, Super, and Ultra mode. Ultra Big Bosses require the use of an item called "Ultra Orb" specific to each boss to be challenged. The requirements to get Ultra Orbs vary between bosses. Additionally, eight bosses have an additional Challenge Mode, where the objective is to beat a set amount of them with increasing difficulty as fast as possible.

Each mission has a distinct set of objectives. These may include collecting items, battling Yo-kai, etc. If all Yo-kai faint, or the timer runs out, the mission is failed.

=== Roles ===
Each playable Yo-kai has one of four roles: Fighter, Tank, Healer, and Ranger. Fighters specialize in dealing damage to foes to defeat them. Tanks protect the team with defensive techniques and support them using negative Inspirit effects. Healers' main purpose is to heal the team to help them stay alive. Rangers use different techniques to support allies by debuffing foes and dealing damage.

=== Moves ===
Each Yo-kai has access to one normal attack and three to four Technique attacks. Some of these are restricted to certain roles or Yo-kai. Additionally, each Yo-kai has a special, powerful move called a Soultimate, which is only performable after the Soul Meter is charged by using attacks. Some Soultimate Moves take longer to charge than others for the same attack.

=== Stats and equipment ===
Similarly to mainline games, in Yo-kai Watch Blasters each Yo-kai has 5 stats: HP, strength, spirit, defense and speed. HP determines how much damage a Yo-kai can take. Speed determines how fast the Yo-kai moves on the field: at a Fast, Normal or Slow speed. Strength affects how powerful a Yo-kai's physical attacks are, and Defense affects the amount of damage that a Yo-kai takes from attacks. The player can give equipment to Yo-kai to increase their stats.

Equipment sometimes has additional benefits, such as increased critical hit chance or resistance to elemental attacks. Players are able to create or strengthen equipment, which usually requires materials and Oni Orbs, and occasionally Yo-kai Souls. Players can also gain equipment by scanning special QR codes, or as treasure drops after clearing a mission.

Players can perform Soulcery to turn Yo-kai into an equippable items called Souls that grant certain benefits. Souls can be leveled up by being fused with other Souls or turned into rare Soul Gems by fusing two specific Souls together.

== Plot ==
The game shows an opening cutscene of Jibanyan, Sandmeh, Hidabat, and Noway fighting Gargaros. They seem to be putting up a valiant fight, until they end running from Gagaros. Then, The Yo-Kai Sergeant Burly sees this and comes over to their house to teach them how to be the true Blasters as possible.

== Release ==
The spin-offs' commercial success in Japan led to a free expansion, Moon Rabbit Crew, (Note: Known in Japan as Yo-kai Watch Busters Getto-gumi (Japanese: 妖(よう)怪(かい)ウォッチバスターズ 月(げっ)兎(と)組(ぐみ), Hepburn: Yōkai Wotchi Basutāzu Getto-gumi, lit. Yokai Watch Busters Moon Rabbit Group)) which released in Japan in December 2015 and worldwide in September 2018.

In addition, a Japanese-exclusive arcade version, Iron Oni Army, (Note: Known in Japan as Yo-kai Watch Busters Tekki-gun (Japanese: 妖(よう)怪(かい)ウォッチバスターズ 鉄(てっ)鬼(き)軍(ぐん), Hepburn: Yōkai Wotchi Basutāzu Tekki-gun, lit. Yokai Watch Busters Iron Oni Army)) was released in December 2015.

== Reception ==
Reception

Aggregate scores
Aggregator	Score
Metacritic	67/100 (both versions)
OpenCritic	20% recommend (Note: Based on 15 reviews)

Review scores
Publication	Score
Destructoid	6/10 (Red Cat Corps)
Electronic Gaming Monthly	3/5
Nintendo Life	8/10
Nintendo World Report	9/10

Both versions of Yo-kai Watch Blasters received mixed or average reviews, according to the review aggregator Metacritic.

== Sequel ==
A sequel, Yo-kai Watch Busters 2: Secret of the Legendary Treasure Bambalaya, (Note: Japanese: 妖怪ウォッチバスターズ2秘宝伝説バンバラヤー, Hepburn: Yōkai Wotchi Basutāzu 2 Hihō Densetsu Banbarayā) was also released in two versions, Sword (Note: Japanese: ソード) and Magnum, (Note: Japanese: マグナム) on December 16, 2017. The sequel games are linkable with the Blasters games as well as the three versions of Yo-kai Watch 3 released in Japan.

Busters 2 has not been localized into English yet as not only did Level 5's North American operations officially shut down in October 2020, the production of the Nintendo 3DS family of consoles also ended in September 2020.
