= Yo-kai Watch Shadowside: Oni-ō no Fukkatsu =

2017 film by Shinji Ushiro

- Theatrical release poster

Japanese name
- Kanji: 映画 妖怪ウォッチ シャドウサイド 鬼王の復活
Transcriptions
- Revised Hepburn: Eiga Yōkai Wotchi Shadōsaido Oniō no Fukkatsu
- Directed by: Shinji Ushiro
- Screenplay by: Yoichi Kato; Akihiro Hino (supervisor)
- Based on: Yo-kai Watch by Level-5 GeGeGe no Kitarō by Shigeru Mizuki
- Music by: Kenichirō Saigō
- Production company: OLM, Inc.
- Distributed by: Toho
- Release date: December 16, 2017
- Running time: 94 minutes
- Country: Japan
- Language: Japanese
- Box office: ¥2.04 billion

Yo-kai Watch Shadowside Oni-o no Fukkatsu (Note: Yo-kai Watch Shadowside: Oni-ō no Fukkatsu (映画 妖怪ウォッチ シャドウサイド 鬼王の復活, Eiga Yōkai Wotchi Shadōsaido Oniō no Fukkatsu; lit. Yo-kai Watch Shadowside the Movie: Resurrection of the Demon King)) is a 2017 supernatural anime film produced by OLM, Inc. and distributed by Toho. It is the fourth film in the Yo-kai Watch film series, following the 2016 film Yo-kai Watch: Soratobu Kujira to Double no Sekai no Daibōken da Nyan!, and features characters from Shigeru Mizuki's GeGeGe no Kitarō manga. (Note: Characters from both franchises also co-appeared in the novel series USO Makoto Yōkai Hyaku Monogatari.) It is directed by Shinji Ushiro and written by Yoichi Kato, with Level-5 president Akihiro Hino overseeing the production and script. It was released on Japanese theaters on December 16, 2017, and on DVD on July 4, 2018.

The movie takes place 30 years after the events of the original Yo-kai Watch anime series. The original series' main protagonist Keita "Keta" Amano (known as Nathan "Nate" Adams in English) was a wielder of the Yo-kai Watch, with which he befriended Yo-kai and fulfilled many great deeds. However, after he grew up and married his childhood friend and crush Fumika "Fumi-chan" Kodama (known as Katie Forester in English), he lost his ability to see Yo-kai. The Yo-kai Watch was cast away into oblivion, as its existence threatened to disturb the balance between the human world and the Yo-kai World, with its story becoming but a legend. Many years later, a comet heralds the arrival of a new threat as an epidemic Yo-kai virus known as Onimaro spreads and causes chaos throughout the city, infecting people with malevolent intentions and turning them into Kaodeka Oni. With the end near, only the ones chosen by a new Yo-kai Watch can save both humans and Yo-kai from certain destruction and rekindle the bonds between them.

== Plot ==
A boy once befriended Yo-kai through the Yo-kai Watch, but after growing up and becoming an adult, he lost the ability to see them and the Yo-kai Watch was cast away into oblivion. Thirty years later, Touma Tsukinami awakens to find that his parents are not home from work again, while a news report comments on an unusual comet. Meanwhile, Natsume Amano, remembering how she was once saved after drowning in a river, stops to save a child from drowning while nearby adults act strangely. On his way to school, Akinori Arihoshi sees the comet in the sky. His grandmother, Mitsue Arihoshi, confirms that it is a sign of an Onimaro invasion, and they seek the Yo-kai Watch Elda to battle them.

In the Yo-kai World, Jao Kaira is outraged that he is not recognised as ruler after deposing his old rival Enma Daio. Touma is scouted by a trio of Onimaro who possess him and allow him to defeat a trio of thugs. The Onimaro trio offer him power to make the world stop ignoring him; he agrees and they summon the Onimaro Leader, who possesses Touma. Mitsue explains how the Onimaro feast on humanity's impulses, driving their victims into a frenzy and killing them. The Onimaro gift Touma the Kigan Gear, a wrist device that allows him to control Onimaro, who begin possessing humans and mutating them into Kaodeka Oni as Nurarihyon frees Enma.

Natsume's friend Saki warns her that she could have died, but Natsume brushes it off, attributing her survival to a key-shaped charm. Natsume finds the Yo-kai butler Whisper testing candidates for the Yo-kai Watch Elda, and he instructs her on how to use it. Mitsumata Nozuchi is summoned and pursues her, but Natsume receives a Yo-kai Ark, a device for summoning Yo-kai, from Akinori and summons Himoji, who defeats him. Natsume dismisses the group and returns home to find that her mother and younger brother have become Kaodeka Oni and summons Mitsumata Nozuchi, now calling himself Micchy. He petrifies them, and Natsume agrees to help after recognizing the threat the Onimaro pose.

As Natsume befriends Jibanyan, Kaira intercepts Enma and Nurarihyon, believing that he can use the Raimeiken, a Yoseiken sword belonging to Fudo Myoo, to control the Onio Rasen. However, Enma defeats Kaira and convinces him to help them. Natsume and her companions confront Touma, who the Onimaro trio have become worried about as the Kigan Gear causes him pain. As the pain intensifies, Touma flees and the Onimaro Leader decides to kill him for his inability to lead, as well as the Onimaro trio after they intervene; however, Micchy forces him to flee.

The group enlist the help of Kitaro to save Touma, revealing to Touma that people did care about him. The Kigan Gear becomes the Yo-kai Watch Ogre, which Touma uses to separate the Onimaro from their victims. However, Rasen absorbs the Onimaro and attacks the city. Enma summons the Raimeiken and he and Touma manage to convince Fudo Myoo to help them. Rasen throws Natsume into the sea, but her charm is revealed to be a Yo-kai Ark and she is rescued by Seiryuu, the Yo-kai who had saved her from drowning. Seiryuu and his Yo-kai friends summoned by Natsume break Rasen's armor and, with help from Enma and Kaira, who fuse to become Yami Enma, Touma beheads Rasen with the Raimeiken, saving Natsume. Touma dies after being impaled by a crystal, but the Onimaro trio, having come to care for him, sacrifice themselves to revive him.

The Yo-kai return home and Enma declares Kaira as his official successor. The children return to their families and Natsume's father is revealed to be Keita "Keta" Amano. Elsewhere, Shutendoji is revealed to have been responsible for the Onimaro arriving early, having planned to use the chaos to locate the "Princess".

== Characters ==
=== Returning cast ===
Character	Voice actor
Jibanyan	Takaya Kuroda
Whisper	Tomokazu Seki
Komasan	Daisuke Hirakawa
Lord Enma	Ryōhei Kimura
Zazel	Takehito Koyasu

=== New characters ===
- Mone Kamishiraishi as Natsume Amano (天野ナツメ, Amano Natsume) (Note: Summer Adams in many English releases of Yo-kai Watch). An 13-year-old junior high schooler and Keta and Fumi-chan's daughter. When she was young, she nearly drowned in a river before being saved by a mysterious figure. She is chosen by the new Yo-kai Watch, the Yo-kai Watch Elda, allowing her to use Yo-kai Arks to summon Yo-kai and transform them into their Lightside or Shadowside forms, and protect both humans and Yo-kai from the Oni King Rasen and the Onimaro.
- Yudai Chiba as Touma Tsukinami (月浪トウマ, Tsukinami Tōuma) (Note: Cole in many English releases of Yo-kai Watch). An 13-year-old junior high schooler who has become isolated since his parents are often away at work. As a result, he is often bullied and harbors hatred towards people, never wanting to mingle with them, which only makes him feel alone and ignored. He forms a bargain with Oni King Rasen's Onimaro followers and becomes an agent of the Onimaro, wielding the Kigan Gear to spread evil and malice. Later in the film, he is redeemed by Natsume and Akinori and the Kigan Gear transforms into the Yo-kai Watch Ogre, allowing him to transform into four Genma Yo-kai, as well as use Yoseiken to possession summon and transform into Kenbumajin Yo-kai to fight against Rasen.
- Mutsumi Tamura as Akinori Arihoshi (有星アキノリ, Arihoshi Akinori) (Note: Bruno in many English releases of Yo-kai Watch). An 13-year-old shaman in training and the oldest of the Arihoshi family, who has used Yo-kai in their fortune telling for many generations. He is capable of using magic and uses spells and incantations to fight Yo-kai.
- Ako Mayama as Mitsue Arihoshi (有星みつえ, Arihoshi Mitsue), Akinori's grandmother.
- Masako Nozawa as Kitaro (鬼太郎, Kitarō), a Yo-kai kid who is the last remaining member of the Ghost Tribe. He lives with his father, Medama-Oyaji (目玉おやじ) (voiced by Bin Shimada) and looks after humans while acting as a mediator between them and Yo-kai. He becomes involved with the Onimaro invasion and the arrival of the Oni King Rasen, assisting Natsume and Touma in stopping him.
- Akio Ōtsuka as Nezumi Otoko (ねずみ男), a rodent-like human and Yo-kai hybrid and Kitaro's friend, though he sometimes backstabs him and his friends through his vile schemes.
- Yuko Minaguchi as Neko-Musume (ねこ娘), a human-like Yo-kai who is close friends with Kitaro and transforms into a monstrous catgirl when angry. She harbors a crush on Kitaro and despises Nezumi Otoko.
- Other members of the Kitarō Family include Nurikabe (ぬりかべ, Nurikabe); Konaki-Jijii (子泣きじじい, Konaki-Jijii) (voiced by Kōzō Shioya), Sunakake-Babaa (砂かけばばあ, Sunakake-Babaa) (voiced by Hiroko Emori), and Ittan-Momen (一反もめん, Ittan-Momen).
- Jun Fukuyama as Lord Ananta (蛇王カイラ, Jaō Kaira), a humanoid Yo-kai and longtime rival of Lord Enma, who wishes to become the new king of the Yo-kai World. Initially serving an antagonistic role, he comes to help the protagonists fight Rasen and the Onimaro after being defeated by Lord Enma.
- Unshō Ishizuka as Oni King Rasen (鬼王・羅仙, Oniō Rasen), a powerful evil Yo-kai who feeds upon human "malice" and can harness humans and Yo-kai's "inner darkness" to control them. He has continually antagonized humanity, and his Onimaro followers seek to resurrect him in the present.
- Yoshimitsu Shimoyama as the Onimaro Leader (鬼まろリーダー, Onimaro Rīdā), the Onimaro leading the preparations for Oni King Rasen's awakening and in charge of selecting human heralds.

== Production ==
First announced on the screening of Yo-kai Watch: Soratobu Kujira to Double no Sekai no Daibōken da Nyan! greeting event on December 4, 2016. The film was first revealed in the July Issue of Shogakukan's CoroCoro Comic magazine, which also revealed the new Lightside and Shadowside forms of the Yo-kai featured in the film. The film's official plot and characters were revealed in the official movie website alongside the staff working on the movie. Akihiro Hino stated the movie is a "completely new horror comedy" that would be scarier in tone compared to the previous films, but still have humor. As well, the new characters would have darker backstories and Yo-kai would have Lightside and Shadowside forms. Level-5 later announced in September that the film would be a crossover with the manga series GeGeGe no Kitarō, with veteran voice actor Masako Nozawa reprising her role as Kitaro.

In later announcements for the film, the voice actors for the two main characters were revealed, with Yudai Chiba voicing Touma and Mone Kamishiraishi voicing Natsume. In October 27, the main movie website was updated, revealing more voice actors who would reprise their roles in the film. However, Takaya Kuroda and Daisuke Hirakawa were revealed to be the new voices of Jibanyan and Komasan, replacing Etsuko Kozakura and Aya Endō respectively. The voice actors for Medama-Oyaji, Neko-Musume and Nezumi Otoko were also revealed, and a second promotional video was released.

== Music ==
Series composer Kenichirō Saigō wrote the film's score for its original release. The film's ending themes are titled Yuki no Hi no Saikai (雪の日の再会; "Snowy Day Reunion") by Kota Okamoto and Yōkai Taisō Dai-ichi GeGeGe no Kitaro ver. (ようかい体操第一 ゲゲゲの鬼太郎Ver., Yōkai taisō dai ichi gegege no kitarō Ver.; "Yo-kai Exercise No.1 GeGeGe no Kitaro ver.") by King Cream Soda.

== Release ==
The film was released in Japan on December 16, 2017, and on DVD on July 4, 2018. Early pre-orders of movie tickets allowed viewers to obtain an Lord Acala Amulet Card, which can be scanned through the Nintendo 3DS to obtain the character in Yokai Watch Busters 2.

== Reception ==
The film earned 399 million yen in its first week, debuting 2nd in the Japanese box office behind Star Wars: The Last Jedi. It stayed in the 2nd spot within the 2nd and 3rd week, before falling to 5th place. Within the span of 8 weeks, it earned more than ¥1,863,413,400.

== Sequel ==
Though no new films were announced in the film's post-credits scene, it is followed by the anime series Yo-kai Watch Shadowside, which premiered on April 13, 2018. Yo-kai Watch: Forever Friends, a film serving as a prequel to the original anime series, was released in Japanese theaters on December 14, 2018.
