= Yo-kai Watch Busters 2: Secret of the Legendary Treasure Bambalaya =

2017 role-playing video game

- Official cover art depicting some of the game's main characters
- Developer: Digital Works Entertainment
- Publisher: Level-5
- Series: Yo-kai Watch
- Platform: Nintendo 3DS
- Release: JP: December 16, 2017
- Genre: Role-playing
- Modes: Single-player, multiplayer

Yo-kai Watch Busters 2: Secret of the Legendary Treasure Bambalaya (Note: Japanese: 妖怪ウォッチバスターズ2 秘宝伝説バンバラヤー Hepburn: Yōkai Wotchi Basutāzu 2 Hihō Densetsu Banbarayā) is a 2017 role-playing video game developed and published by Level-5 for the Nintendo 3DS, released exclusively in Japan. A sequel to 2015's Yo-kai Watch Blasters, the game was released as two different versions: Sword and Magnum. Busters 2 sees the player controlling a team of up to four Yo-kai, who explore the fictitious Karakuri Island in search of treasure.

Busters 2 was received positively by critics; Famitsu stated that the game rewarded "hard work" and 4Gamer.net felt that the game was better than mainline Yo-kai Watch entries, due to Busters 2 being "easier to manage". Busters 2 also received positive sales, being reported to have sold over 465 thousand copies in the first month of its release.

== Gameplay ==
The player fighting against one of the game's Big Bosses as Jibanyan T

Busters 2 is a role-playing game that sees players controlling a team of up to 4 Yo-kai who explore the Karakuri Island in search of treasure. While exploring, players will come across enemy Yo-kai, who they must defeat using their own Yo-kai. After defeating an enemy Yo-kai, the player may get a chance to befriend it, meaning that a player can put the befriended Yo-kai on their team. To befriend a Yo-kai, players must successfully perform a minigame. The game includes over 750 Yo-kai, some of which debuted in Busters 2. The game is divided into chapters, with each chapter typically ending in the player fighting a "Big Boss". Each Big Boss utilizes a unique attack method. After clearing a chapter, the Karakuri Island expands with new areas.

Randomly during exploration, the words "Bambalaya!" are shout, which is followed by a random effect. A returning element from previous Yo-kai Watch games is the Crank-a-Kai, a gashapon machine where players can befriend Yo-kai and receive items by inserting and cranking digital coins.

== Development and release ==
Busters 2 was developed and published by the Japanese company Level-5, who had also developed and published all other installments in the Yo-kai Watch series.

Busters 2 was first announced by Level-5 in the August 2017 issue of CoroCoro Comics. Level-5 later announced further details in the September issue of CoroCoro and showcased the game's gameplay later the same month in a Japanese Nintendo Direct. A trailer for the game was later uploaded to Level-5's official YouTube channel, which showcased further gameplay and some of the Yo-kai that would be debuting in the game.

The game was scheduled for release on December 7, 2017; however, it was delayed to December 16. Each of the game's versions included a physical Yo-kai Medal. To promote the game's release, Level-5 held an event in the Japanese version of Yo-kai Watch: Wibble Wobble, which included a world themed around Busters 2. The game's initial release featured numerous bugs, which caused Level-5 to release multiple patches.

== Reception and sales ==
Reception

Review score
Publication	Score
Famitsu	34/40

Busters 2 was received well from critics, being rated 34/40 by Famitsu. Akiru Miyashita, writing for 4Gamer.net, was positive towards the game and recommended the game to players who wanted to be rewarded for "hard work". Miyashita stated that he enjoyed the Busters series more than the traditional Yo-kai Watch series, due to the Busters series being easier to manage.

Famitsu called the act of befriending Yo-kai in the game "fun and satisfying", and described the game's balancing of its mechanics as "exquisite". Multiple Famitsu reviewers were positive towards the "Bambalaya!" mechanic; Honma Urara called it a "good stimulus" and Gigolo Ashida described it as "unique". Ranbu Yoshida was more mixed towards the mechanic, stating that some players wouldn't enjoy its "extremes".

Busters 2 sold over 208 thousand copies in its first week of release, making it the best-selling video game in the week of December 11. In January 2018, Busters 2 was reported to have sold over 465 thousand copies across its two versions.
