= Takaya Kuroda =

Japanese actor

- 黒田 崇矢
- Born: Tokyo, Japan
- Education: Tamagawa University
- Occupations: Actor; voice actor
- Years active: 1984–present
- Agent: Axlone

Takaya Kuroda (黒田崇矢, Kuroda Takaya) is a Japanese actor and voice actor from Tokyo, Japan. He is affiliated with Axlone, and was formerly with Mausu Promotion and 81 Produce.

He is best known for his bass voice, which has usually seen him cast in villainous roles such as the voice of Yaiba in GoGo Sentai Boukenger. He is best known to western audiences for voicing Kazuma Kiryu, the protagonist of the Yakuza series. Because of his vocal resemblance to the late Hirotaka Suzuoki, he was chosen to replace Suzuoki as the voice of Starscream in Transformers: Cybertron as Suzuoki's health deteriorated. Kuroda is also the lead singer of the rock band Takaya Kuroda & Goodfellas.

== Early Life ==
Kuroda spent part of his childhood in Brazil. He holds a degree from Tamagawa University.

Kuroda began practicing karate in elementary school. At the time, it was falsely believed that one must not drink water while exercising, and most instructors lacked proper knowledge about hydration. Due to the harsh training that he endured, Kuroda damaged his spine severely. As a result, he developed several conditions including spondylolysis, spondylolisthesis, disc herniation, and injuries to both his cervical and lumbar vertebrae. At the age of 16, he had difficulty walking, and doctors told him that he would be completely unable to walk by the age of 30. He was offered the option of undergoing surgery, but if the operation failed, he could become paralyzed from the waist down and spend the rest of his life in a wheelchair. Kuroda declined the surgery and resolved to defy the doctors' predictions. He then made up his mind: "Rather than undergo a risky all-or-nothing operation, I'll keep walking until I'm over 30, right up until the day I die. I'll overcome this condition myself."

== Career ==
As an Actor

In 1984, he enrolled in a training program at Bungakuza, a theatrical company. He worked as a television, film, and stage actor under the name 黒田隆哉 (Takaya Kuroda). At the time, he believed his condition would improve, and intended to leave the theater company and return to martial arts once he had recovered. Defying his doctors' predictions, he continued working as an actor until around his mid-30s.

After around 20 years in the profession, he had grown to love acting. However, his physical condition continued to deteriorate, eventually making it difficult for him to even stand up. Since painkillers had stopped working, Kuroda would take nerve-block injections to numb the affected nerves and wore a back brace while filming. Although he would have liked to continue acting, he eventually realized that he could no longer inconvenience the people around him, and decided to quit.

As a Voice Actor

After stepping away from acting, an acquaintance approached him and suggested voice acting as a less stressful alternative. From then on, he began working in various voice-related fields, including anime, video games, dubbing, and narration. Around this time, he changed his stage name to his current name, 黒田崇矢 (Takaya Kuroda).

== Filmography ==
=== Animation ===
List of voice performances in animation
Year	Title	Role	Notes	Source
1999	Weekly Storyland ja:週刊ストーリーランド	Alex		
2001	One Piece	Bogard		
2002	Dragon Drive	Agent S		
2003	Cromartie High School	Masked Takenouchi		
2003	Wolf's Rain	Darcia		
2003	R.O.D the TV	Sonny Wong		
2004	Battle B-Daman	Saori 三十郎		
2004	Mars Daybreak	Ligardi リガルディ		
2004	Sgt. Frog	Space Police K 宇宙警視K		
2004	Madlax	Sergeant		
2004	Monster	Murderer		
2004	Burst Angel	Mafia boss, Hiroki Machikata		
2004	Bleach	Baura	Sawadori's doll, anime original character	
2005	Jinki:Extend	J. Harn		
2005	Starship Operators	Lee Young Sook		
2005	Transformers: Cybertron	Starscream		
2005	Kaiketsu Zorori	Dr. Dragon ドラゴン博士		
2005	Trinity Blood	Peter Van der Werf, Biedel ビーデル		
2005	Petopeto-san	Kakuda Police Department Manager 角田巡査部長		
2005	Angel Heart	Timpira, Yakuza チンピラ／ヤクザ		
2005	Akagi	Kawashima		
2005	Black Cat	David Pepper		
2005	Mai Otome	Teens		
2005	Blood+	Rodgers		
2005	Fafner of the Azure Right of Left	Operator		
2006	Bakegyamon	Gig		
2006–2015	Gintama series	Yagyuu Koshinori		
2006	Nana	Yamagishi		
2006–2011	Ring ni Kakero 1 series	Don Giuliano		
2006	Black Lagoon	Spieleberger		
2006	Black Jack 21	Genbu		
2006	The Third	Travel Leader		
2006	Jyu-Oh-Sei	Gesso ジェッソ		
2006	Otogi-Jūshi Akazukin	Basterai		
2006	Chocotto Sister	Master		
2006	Black Blood Brothers	August Walker		
2006	Galaxy Angel San ja:ギャラクシーエンジェる～ん	Instructor Sakae サカエ教官		
2006	Red Garden	Claire 's father クレアの父		
2006	Ghost Slayers Ayashi	Nobori's father		
2007	Rocket Girls	Kazuya Kinoshita		
2007	Mai Otome Zwei	Major	OVA ep. 2	
2007–2011	Shakugan no Shana series	Sabrac	Starting from II	
2008	Noramimi ja:のらみみ	Andrew		
2008	Kure-nai	Renjō Kuhōin		
2008	Allison and Lilia	Wayne		
2008	The Tower of Druaga: The Aegis of Uruk	Dark Knight		
2008	Himitsu – Top Secret	Akira Yoshino 吉野晃		
2008	Golgo 13	Ted テッド		
2008–2017	Natsume's Book of Friends	Misuzu		
2008	Blade of the Immortal	Tsuchiyoshiro 土持仁三郎		
2008	Magician's Academy	Izumo, Galactica Elefanger イズモ／ギャラクティカ・エレファンガー		
2009	The Girl Who Leapt Through Space	Soldier Ul		
2009	Viper's Creed	Saiki		
2009	Hajime no Ippo	Arnie Gregory		
2009	Phantom: Requiem for the Phantom	Randy Weber ランディー・ウェーバー		
2009	Arad Senki ~ Slap-up Party ~	Jeda		
2009	Ristorante Paradiso	Vito ヴィート		
2009	Element Hunters	Commander Coff コフ司令官		
2009	Aika Zero	Captain	OVA	
2009–2019	Fairy Tail	Capricorn, Arcadius, Zirconis		
2010	Durarara!!	Simon Brezhnev	Also X2 in 2015–16	
2010	Dance in the Vampire Bund	Alfonso Borziani アルフォンソ・ボルジアーニ		
2010	Beyblade: Metal Masters	Russian DJ ロシアDJ		
2010	Rainbow: Nisha Rokubou no Shichinin	Tadayoshi Toyama		
2010	The Betrayal Knows My Name	Cadenza		
2010	Highschool of the Dead	Yoshioka		
2010–2011	Gokujō!! Mecha Mote Iinchō	Ricky		
2010–2011	Tono to Issho series	Oda Nobunaga	2 seasons	
2010	And Yet the Town Moves	Yuji Sanada		
2011	Dream Eater Merry	Lestion		
2011	Spelunker	Physical education teacher	OVA (general)	
2011	Bakugan Battle Brawlers: Gundalian Invaders	Dharak		
2011	Digimon Fusion	Neo Vandemon ネオヴァンデモン		
2011	Hyouge Mono	Yasuke		
2011	Nura: Rise of the Yokai Clan: Demon Capital	Kidomaru		
2011–2012	Horizon on the Middle of Nowhere	Kiyonari Ulquiaga	2 seasons	
2012	The Knight in the Area	Kengo Shiroyukiuchi 城之内健吾		
2012	Ozuma	General Danga ダンガ将軍		
2012	Eureka Seven AO	Truth (sergeant guerrilla) トゥルース（ゲリラ軍曹）		
2012	Chōsoku Henkei Gyrozetter	Goat ゴート		
2012	Btooom!	Masashi Miyamoto		
2012	Ixion Saga DT	The elder brother 長兄		
2012	Yu-Gi-Oh! Zexal II	Fumaro 風魔		
2013	Cuticle Detective Inaba	Kaoru Shiroshima 城島薫		
2013	Hunter × Hunter	Razor		
2013	Valvrave the Liberator	Ryuuji Sashinami 指南リュージ		
2013	Honorable style! It is! Kanetsugu and Keiji ja: 義風堂々!! 兼続と慶次	Damnion Micho 乱裁道宗		
2013	Gundam Build Fighters	Greco Logan		
2014	Toaru Hikūshi e no Koiuta	Juan Rodrigo Bandereas		
2014	World Conquest Zvezda Plot	Mysterious man / Governor Tinto Kyoshiro 謎の男／都知事地紋京志郎		
2014	Inari, Konkon, Koi Iroha	Susanoo-no-Mikoto 須佐之男		
2014	Dragonar Academy	Mordred モルドレッド		
2014	Nobunaga Concerto	Masanaga Hisahide		
2014	Invaders of the Rokujyōma!?	Aniki アニキ		
2014	Idea Diva ja:みならいディーバ	Swallon スワロン		
2014	Gonna be the Twin-Tail!!	Turtle Guildy		
2014	Naruto: Shippuden	Kinkaku		
2015	Miritari!	Ossan		
2015	Comical Psychosomatic Medicine	Various characters	ONA	
2015	Show By Rock series	Dagger Morse ダガー・モールス	2 seasons (Season 2 Eps. 1, 5 – )	
2015	Duel Masters Versus Revolution	Gachi Robo ガチロボ		
2015	Triage X	Masamune Mochizuki		
2015	Yamada-kun and the Seven Witches	Black-haired Yankee, Kuroda-kun		
2015	Ninja Slayer From Animation	Fumatoni / Sonic Boom フマトニ／ソニックブーム	ONA	
2015	Suzakinishi the Animation	Tsumi-kun つみくん		
2015	The Kindaichi Case Files R	Investigation Division Section Manager 捜査一課課長	season 2	
2016	Sekkō Boys	Hanzō Horibe		
2016	Future Card Buddyfight Triple D	Abygale アビゲール		
2016	Joker Game	Colonel Tetsutoshi Tendo 風戸哲正中佐		
2016	91 Days	Nick ニック		
2016	Poco's Udon World	Gamigao Hamada 浜田吾郎／ガオガオちゃん		
2017	Future Card Buddyfight X	Awakened Black Death Dragon, Abygale 覚醒の黒死竜アビゲール		
2017	Puri-Puri Chiichan	Chiichan's Father ちぃちゃんパパ	Ep. 12, 20	
	Shukan Storyland	Alex アレックス		
2017	Altair: A Record of Battles	Büyük Pasha		
2017	Inuyashiki	Samejima	Episode 4	
2018	Sword Gai	Grimms	ONA	
2018	Uchi no Maid ga Uzasugiru!	Kumagoro 熊五郎 (Yonaoshi Guild character)	Episode 2	
2018–2019	Yo-kai Watch Shadowside	Jibanyan		
2019	Sarazanmai	Otter		
2019	After School Dice Club	Takeru Kinjō		
2019–2021	Welcome to Demon School! Iruma-kun series	Sullivan		
2020	A Destructive God Sits Next to Me	Gorio		
2020	Boruto: Naruto Next Generations	Kedama		
2020	Sleepy Princess in the Demon Castle	Flame Poison Dragon		
2020–present	Jujutsu Kaisen	Masamichi Yaga		
2020	Hypnosis Mic: Division Rap Battle	Rei Amayado		
2021	Ex-Arm	Throughhand		
2021	The Quintessential Quintuplets ∬	Maruo Nakano		
2021–2023	Umamusume: Pretty Derby	Kuronuma	2 seasons	
2021	Farewell, My Dear Cramer	Eiken Asuka		
2021	Odd Taxi	Kuroda		
2021	Tesla Note	Elmo		
2022	Salaryman's Club	Yasuomi Ōno		
2022	Cap Kakumei Bottleman DX	Suezō Hocari		
2022	VazzRock the Animation	Yūshō Tōi		
2023	Hypnosis Mic: Division Rap Battle: Rhyme Anima+	Rei Ayamado	Season 2	
2024	Code Geass: Rozé of the Recapture	Kensei Kuroto	OVA	
2025	Headhunted to Another World	Talius		
2025	Hell Teacher: Jigoku Sensei Nube	Hatamonba		
2026	Roll Over and Die	Gadhio Lathcutt		
2026	Mistress Kanan Is Devilishly Easy	Beelzebub		
2026	Daemons of the Shadow Realm	Misasagi		

=== Film ===
List of voice performances in films
Year	Title	Role	Notes	Source
2007	Detective Conan: Jolly Roger in the Deep Azure	Shietsu Tayama		
2007	Vexille	Zack		
2007	Appleseed Ex Machina	Arges		
2013	Detective Conan: Private Eye in the Distant Sea	The Spy X		
2014	Mirror Island of Parol ja:パロルのみらい島	Eagle ワシ		
2014	Spochan-Anime The Movie :Youkai Spochan Battle ja:スポチャン対決！妖怪大決戦	Makai Yamamoto Goro Zaimon gate 魔妖怪 山本五郎左衛門		
2016	Crayon Shin-chan: Fast Asleep! Dreaming World Big Assault!	President of Shares 紛剃社長		
2017	Yo-kai Watch Shadowside: Oni-ō no Fukkatsu	Jibanyan		
2018	Natsume's Book of Friends the Movie: Tied to the Temporal World	Misuzu		
2019	The Legend of the Galactic Heroes: Die Neue These Seiran	Dawson		
2021	Natsume's Book of Friends: The Waking Rock and the Strange Visitor	Misuzu		
2021	The Journey	Abraha		
2021	Jujutsu Kaisen 0	Masamichi Yaga		
2022	The Quintessential Quintuplets Movie	Maruo Nakano		

=== Video games ===
List of voice performances in video games
Year	Title	Role	Source
2000	The King of Fighters 2000	Lin, Ron	
2001	The King of Fighters 2001	Lin, Ron	
2003–2004	Tales of Symphonia	Botta, Shadow	
2003	Kamen Rider: Genealogy of Justice 仮面ライダー 正義の系譜	Nobuhiko Akizuki (Shadow Moon) / General Black 秋月信彦（シャドームーン）／ブラック将軍	
2004–2014	Sengoku Musou series	Hattori Hanzo	
2004	Gakuen Prince ~ Declaration of Conquest of the Gakuen ~ 学園Prince～学園征服宣言～	Seto Suneharu 瀬戸宗晴	
2004	Magna Carta series	Orha Duren	
2004	Lupin the 3rd: Columbus' heritage stains with vermillion ja:ルパン三世 コロンブスの遺産は朱に染まる	Gomer ゴマー	
2005	Romancing SaGa: Minstrel Song	Flame Tyrant	
2005	Jingai Makyō	Shintaku 神鷹	
2005	Fatal Frame III: The Tormented	Aso Yuu 麻生優雨	
2005	Yoshinori Yoshinaga ja:義経紀	Saburo Ise 伊勢三郎	
2005	Yakuza	Kazuma Kiryu	
2006	AV King; AVキング (Note: Credited as Taka Kurose)	Champion · Hawk チャンピオン・鷹	
2006	Messiah ja:メサイア	Glitter 煌	
2006	Super Robot Taisen XO スーパーロボット大戦XO	Voeto Nicolaus ヴォート・ニコラウス	
2006	Yakuza 2	Kazuma Kiryu	
2007–2008	Warriors Orochi series	Hattori Hanzo	
2007	Bullet Butlers	Race レイス	
2007	I started maid ★ ~ I will take care of my husband ~ ja:メイド★はじめました 〜ご主人様のお世話いたします〜	Kentaro Kanno 苅野健太郎	
2008	Ryū ga Gotoku Kenzan!	Kazumanosuke Kiryu, Miyamoto Musashi	
2008	Messiah ~ Paranoia · Paradox ~ メサイア ～パラノイア・パラドックス～	Shimajima Kira 蓜島煌	
2008	Volume 7	Tsuji Tadashiro 辻占千道	
2009	The King of Fighters 2002: Unlimited Match	Lin, Ron	
2009	Yakuza 3	Kazuma Kiryu	
2009	Memoria	Fonzel-Klaus フォンゼル＝クラウス	
2010	Yakuza 4	Kazuma Kiryu	
2010	Durarara!! 3way standoff	Simon Brezhnev	
2011	Muv-Luv Alternative Chronicles	Gerhard von Ralerstein	
2011	Yakuza: Dead Souls	Kazuma Kiryu	
2011	Hakuisei Renai Shoukougun	Toshiyuki Otsuka 大塚俊幸	
2011	Battlefield 3	Henry Blackburn	
2011	Marvel vs. Capcom 3	Nathan Spencer	
2011	Nura: Rise of the Yokai Clan games	Kids Round 鬼童丸	
2011	Everybody's Golf 6	Kazuma Kiryu	
2012	Maji de Watashi ni Koi Shinasai! S	Hume Hellsing ヒューム・ヘルシング	
2012	Hakuisei Renai Shoukougun RE: Therapy	Toshiyuki Otsuka 大塚俊幸	
2012	Witch's Garden ja:ウィッチズガーデン	Araki Muneko Goro 荒木宗右衛門悟朗	
2012	Aete Mushi Suru Kimi to no Mirai ~Relay Broadcast~ あえて無視するキミとの未来 ～Relay broadcast～	Tachibana Akira 橘薫	
2012	Yakuza 5	Kazuma Kiryu	
2013	Horizon in the Middle of Nowhere games	Kiyonari Urquiaga キヨナリ・ウルキアガ	
2013	Chōsoku Henkei Gyrozetter	Dr. Goth ゴート博士	
2013	Etrian Odyssey Untold: The Millennium Girl	Gun Liu ガンリュー	
2013	Negai no Kakera to Hakugin no Agreement ja:願いの欠片と白銀の契約者	Jay (Jack · F · Mune Mori) ジェイ（ジャック・F・ムネモリ）	
2013	Shirahana no Ori ~Hiiro no Kakera 4~ Shiki no Uta ja:白華の檻 ～緋色の欠片4～ 四季の詩	Huge earth front 胡土前	
2013	Starry ☆ Sky ~ After Winter ~ Portable	Shojiro Shirani 不知火宗次郎	
2013	Boyfriend (Kari)	Keiji Ito 東麻慶史	
2014	Ryū ga Gotoku Ishin!	Sakamoto Ryōma / Saitō Hajime 坂本龍馬／斎藤一	
2014	Satomi Hakkenden series ja:里見八犬伝 八珠之記	Lawyer 丶大法師	
2015	Otoko Yuukaku 男遊郭	Iroha いろは	
2015	Raicho	Mengchi 孟獲	
2015	Natsuiro High School: Seishun Hakusho	High School chairman	
2015	JoJo's Bizarre Adventure: Eyes of Heaven	Risotto Nero	
2015	Sweet Column ~ Occasional clown in the morning ~	Ghat ガート	
2015	Zettai Meikyuu Himitsu no Oyayubi-hime 絶対迷宮 秘密のおやゆび姫	A naked king 裸の王様	
2015	Ayakashi Gohan! Oomori あやかしごはん～おおもりっ！～	Guren 紅蓮	
2015	Project X Zone 2: Brave New World	Kazuma Kiryu	
2015	Fallout 4	Hancock	
2015	Fate/Grand Order	Fergus mac Róich, Ivan the Terrible	
2015	Tom Clancy's Rainbow Six Siege	Warden	
2016	Yakuza Kiwami	Kazuma Kiryu	
2016	SA 7: Silent Ability Seven	Tatsumi Tadashi 有働巽	
2016	Blackish House Side A	Shigeta Onda 與田重虎	
2016	Yakuza 6: The Song of Life	Kazuma Kiryu	
2017	Nambaca (Phase 2) ナンバカ（第2期）	Goku Goku 悟空猿鬼	
2017	Fist of the North Star: Lost Paradise	Kenshiro	
2017	Yakuza Kiwami 2	Kazuma Kiryu	
2018	Shin Megami Tensei: Strange Journey Redux	Morax	
2019	Yo-kai Watch 4	Jibanyan	
2019	The Seven Deadly Sins: Grand Cross	Tyr	
2019	Pokémon Masters EX	Sawyer	
2019	Dragon Quest XI S: Echoes of an Elusive Age	Mordegon, Puff-Puff Girl	
2020	Yakuza: Like a Dragon	Kazuma Kiryu	
2021	The King of Fighters All Star	Lin	
2021	Lord of Heroes	Walther Bernhard	
2021	Bravely Default II	Bernard Alphard	
2021	The Legend of Heroes: Trails Through Daybreak	Ellroy Harwood	
2021	Samurai Warriors 5	Hattori Hanzō	
2022	The Legend of Heroes: Trails Through Daybreak II	Ellroy Harwood	
2022	Star Ocean: The Divine Force	JJ	
2022	Samurai Maiden	Oda Nobunaga	
2023	Like a Dragon: Ishin!	Sakamoto Ryōma / Saitō Hajime 坂本龍馬／斎藤一	
2023	Like a Dragon Gaiden: The Man Who Erased His Name	Kazuma Kiryu	
2024	Like a Dragon: Infinite Wealth	Kazuma Kiryu	
2024	The Legend of Heroes: Trails Beyond the Horizon	Ellroy Harwood	
2025	Like a Dragon: Pirate Yakuza in Hawaii	Kazuma Kiryu	
2025	Rusty Rabbit	Stamp	
2025	Yakuza 0 Director's Cut	Kazuma Kiryu	
2025	Promise Mascot Agency	Michi	
2025	Riichi City	Harada Katsumi	
2025	Mahjong Soul	Hokuraku	
2026	Yakuza Kiwami 3 & Dark Ties	Kazuma Kiryu	
2027	Stranger Than Heaven	Takeo Godai	

=== Drama CDs ===
List of voice performances in drama CDs
Year	Title	Role	Notes	Source
2006	GetBackers	Deep mountains phantom circumference 深山幻周	Drama CD	
	The Girl Who Leapt Through Space	Soldier Ul		

=== Live action ===
List of voice performances in live action series
Year	Title	Role	Notes	Source
2004	Tokusou Sentai Dekaranger	Dradian Goldom ドラド星人ゴルドム	Ep. 24	
2006	GoGo Sentai Boukenger	Yaiba of Darkness 闇のヤイバ	Eps. 3, 5, 9, 12, 14, 17, 22, 25, 32, 35, 38, 40–42, 44, 46	
2006	GoGo Sentai Boukenger the Movie: The Greatest Precious	Yaiba of Darkness 闇のヤイバ	Movie	
2007	Kamen Rider Den-O	Owl Imagin, Albino Leo Imagin オウルイマジン アルビノイマジンレオ	Ep. 13–14 (Owl Imagin), 44–46 (Albino Leo Imagin)	
2009	Kamen Rider Decade	Dogga ドッガ	Ep. 4–5	
2011	Kaizoku Sentai Gokaiger	Barbaric Officer Chirakashizky 保蛮官チラカシズキー	Ep. 35	
2012	Unofficial Sentai Akibaranger	Monzen-Nakachō Hashibirokou 門前仲町ハシビロコウ	Ep. 4	
2013	Zyuden Sentai Kyoryuger	Debo Hoenukky デーボ・ホネヌッキー	Ep. 11	
2016	Drive Saga Kamen Rider Mach/Kamen Rider Heart	Roidmude 5886 ロイミュード5886	OV	
2017	Uchu Sentai Kyuranger	Eridron エリードロン	Eps. 1–5	
2019	Ultraman Taiga	Alien Magma マグマ星人	Ep. 1	
2021	Mashin Sentai Kiramager	Shadon シャドン	Ep. 39	

== Dubbing roles ==
List of Japanese dubbing performances in films and series
Year	Title	Role	Notes	Source
2008	Thomas and Friends	Cranky	Season 9-present	
2015	Outlander	Dougal MacKenzie	Voice dub for Graham McTavish	
2017	Thomas & Friends: The Great Race	Cranky		
2018	Jurassic World: Fallen Kingdom	Ken Wheatley	Voice dub for Ted Levine	
2020	Dolittle	Kevin		
2021	Doom Patrol	Cliff Steele	Voice dub for Brendan Fraser	
2021	Bad Cat	Shero		
