= List of Witch Hat Atelier characters =

A selection of characters from the series; from left to right: Coco, Qifrey, Brushbuddy, Agott, Tetia, Richeh, Olruggio, Tartah, Euini, Nolnoa, and Alaira

The Japanese manga series Witch Hat Atelier features an extensive cast of characters created by Kamome Shirahama. The series takes place in a fictional, fantasy world where magic was commonplace until its misuse led to incountable crisis, wars and catastrophes, leading to the knowledge of how to perform it become restricted to only a few individuals who keep it a secret from the rest of the population. Certain magical practices are forbidden even amongst them due to the possible dangers it can cause.

== Qifrey's Atelier ==
Qifrey's atelier is located on a remote area where he teaches child witches who are considered outcasts because they did not—or refused to—fit into the rigid structures of the old established schools, assisted by his childhood friend Olruggio. They are later joined by main character Coco after she learned the witches' secret and was also taken in as his apprentice.

=== Coco ===
Voiced by: Rena Motomura (Japanese); Anjali Kunapaneni (English)

Coco (ココ, Koko) is a bright, blondish-green haired, optimistic young girl and dressmaker's daughter who dreams of becoming a witch, and sees her wish fulfilled at the horrid cost of her mother getting turned to stone. Subsequently, she is taken in by Qifrey and instead of having her memory erased, she is allowed to learn the ways of rune magic because of her connection to the Brimmed Caps, which gains her a dubious reputation in the magic community. While initially clumsy and naive, she is very enthusiastic about learning all she can about magic, and with her background as an outsider she is able to conceive highly creative ways of using her new-found knowledge.

=== Qifrey ===
Voiced by: Natsuki Hanae (Japanese); Joshua Waters (English)

Qifrey (キーフリー, Kīfurī) is a patient and caring witch mentor with white hair who specializes in water magic. While it is partly out of kindness that he takes Coco in, he has also taken note of the Brimmed Caps' attention on her. He is searching for the Brimmed Caps as he holds a personal grudge against them ever since his childhood, where they used him in a ritual that made him the host of a Silverwood Tree, which took away his right eye (which he now keeps covered by his hair) and the memory of his former life. As a result of their attempts to prevent him from tracking his tormentors, he distanced himself from the Great Hall, returning only for necessities. In his pursuit for vengeance, Qifrey is ruthless enough to employ memory erasing magic to prevent anyone from finding out his intentions, but still cares for his students and tries his best to teach and guide them.

=== Agott Arklaum ===
Voiced by: Hibiku Yamamura (Japanese); Madeleine Morris (English)

Agott Arklaum (アガット・アークロム, Agatto Ākuromu) is a black-haired girl from the renowned Arklaum family, one of the houses who established the vow to keep the magic arts a secret to the general populace. Agott was cast out during her test for apprenticeship when malicious rumors surfaced that the magic she was to present at her trial was plagiarized. Upon becoming Qifrey's student, she became a bitter loner, obsessed with perfecting her magic skills under her own power, and distanced herself from the other apprentices. Upon first meeting Coco, Agott initially hates her with a passion, and out of desperation to make her leave the atelier, she spurns and treats her harshly because Coco was not born a witch. Agott eventually sends her off to a dangerous test to prove Coco's worth, despite knowing Coco had no practical experience with magic. However, as the story progresses, Agott eventually becomes Coco's precious friend and begins to treat her as an equal thanks to the latter's sincerity and magical imagination.

=== Tetia ===
Voiced by: Kurumi Haruki (Japanese); Sarah Wiedenheft (English)

Tetia (テティア) is a bright, bubbly and upbeat girl with pink curly hair in pigtails. She loves thanking other people and spreading happiness. She wants her magic to also make others happy, desperately wanting to create useful spells so she can be remembered in history. So far it is unknown why she became Qifrey's apprentice, as his other students also had special circumstances that led them to study outside the Great Hall.

=== Richeh ===
Voiced by: Hika Tsukishiro (Japanese); Nerida Bronwen (English)

Richehlette (リチェリット, Richeritto), more commonly known as Richeh (リチェ, Riche) for short, is an aloof, distant-looking young girl with long sky blue hair and a stubborn personality. She specializes in drawing very small rune circles and likes drawing original magic. She became withdrawn when her beloved older brother, Riliphin (the only person who appreciated her creative use of magic), became distant from her, refusing to learn new magic or submit to authority. However, during a placement test where she and her friends were ambushed by the Brimmed Caps who turned Euini into a wolf due to Richeh's lack of knowledge in magic, she realized the importance of learning new magic.

=== Olruggio ===
Voiced by: Yuichi Nakamura (Japanese); Reagan Murdock (English)

Olruggio (オルーギオ, Orūgio) is a black haired witch living as a Watchful Eye (a supervisor) for the Great Hall at Qifrey's atelier. He and Qifrey are close childhood friends, although this does not stop Qifrey from erasing his memory when Olruggio gets suspicious of Qifrey's returning obsession with the Brimmed Caps. Olruggio is often seen with eyebags and a tired expression. Despite his gruff demeanor, he is actually a caring soul, and the magical items he creates are commonly meant to increase the comfort of their users. He specializes in magic creating fire, light and heat. He is from Ghodrey, City of Magic in the north where he was well accomplished and regarded as a talented witch. Among his inventions are the glowstone path, snugstone, searneedle wand, and phantasmal fireball sphere.

=== Brushbuddy ===
Voiced by: Misaki Kuno (Japanese); Bryn Apprill (English)

Brushbuddy (フデムシ, Fudemushi; lit. 'Brushbug') is a white fluffy caterpillar-like creature who attaches itself to Coco during her test for apprenticeship (mainly due to his species' love for the smell of magical inks) and henceforth resides at Qifrey's atelier as a pet. It is frequently hinted that he has an intelligence and persona as complex as a human's. Brushbuddy attempts to write a journal based on Coco and the others' behavior at the Atelier, but with little success.

== Brimmed Caps ==
The Brimmed Caps (つばあり帽, Tsuba ari-bō) are a coven of rogue witches who reject the rules of the Day of the Pact and use Forbidden Magic like offensive magic and body changing magic, along with the forbidden act of making spell tattoos on their own bodies, or the bodies of others. Their name comes from their hats which have long brims or other ornaments to cover their faces, as opposed to the Pointed Caps, whose cap-brims are pinned up. Some members like Iguin and Sasaran express an interest in having Coco become a practitioner of forbidden magic, claiming her to be a "child of hope". Their exact structure and motivations are mostly unknown, but it seems that they organize into big groups and then divide into smaller groups to conduct their plans. There are some Brimmed Caps with the likes of Ininia, Restys and Custas are not shown to have an alliance with Iguin and their faction until much later.

=== Iguin ===
Voiced by: Mitsuki Saiga (Japanese); Erin Lundquist (English)

Iguin (イグイーン, Iguīn) is a high-ranking member—and possibly the leader—of the Brimmed Caps, who characteristically wears a cone hat with a face mask shaped like an eye. Iguin is the one who gave Coco the spellbook which ultimately became responsible for turning her mother into stone. Since then, they accompany her growth as a witch, claiming she has a yet undisclosed role in the organization's plans.

=== Custas ===
Voiced by: Toshiki Kumagai (Japanese); Zeno Robinson (English)

Custas (クスタス, Kusutasu) is a young minstrel who had his legs permanently disabled in an accident that Coco and Agott rescued him from. He has come to befriend Tartah, and wished to learn all he can about apothecary from him in order to restore his legs. However, Ininia tells him a partial truth about the true nature of witches' magic, making him join the Brimmed Caps, become one of Restys' apprentices, and turning on Coco and Tartah. However, he is later betrayed when his leg prosthetics are revealed to be sprouts of a parasitic Silverwood Tree which threatens to consume him until Dagda sacrifices himself by letting himself die from his injuries, the stress of which causing Custas' infection to recede.

=== Sasaran ===
Voiced by: Ryūsei Nakao (Japanese); Kellen Goff (English)

Sasaran (ササラン) is a Brimmed Cap who experimented with transformation magic which failed, giving him a feline appearance. In order to hide this, and to intimidate his victims, he has taken to remote-control an empty cloak and hat to impersonate his presence, leading to his nickname "Empty Cloak Witch".

=== Ininia ===
Ininia (イニニア) is an adolescent Brimmed Cap disguised as a regular witch, and Restys' apprentice. Just like Custas and Qifrey, she also has Silverwood Tree sprouts implanted into her body. She is deeply loyal to her master and believes that the Pointed Hat Witches are wrong to restrict access to forbidden magic, including healing spells.

=== Restys ===
Restys (レスティス, Resutisu) is a Brimmed Cap witch who converses with their apprentice Ininia through her staff. They later appear in person before Coco and invite her to be their apprentice, but are rejected. Eventually, Custas was presented with his brimmed cap and became Restys's apprentice.

=== Patchwork hat Brimmed Cap ===
A cheerful and seemingly aloof Brimmed Cap with a patchwork hat, who infiltrated the citizens at the festival. His name is unknown.

== The Great Hall of Witches ==
The Great Hall of Witches (魔法使いの大講堂, Mahōtsukai no Dai Kōdō) is the institution in Coco's world which governs the use of magic, its spreading (by regulating the enlistment and advancement of apprentices) and the maintenance of its secrecy. The Great Hall is located in an underwater city, which can only be reached by a certain stairwell descending into the depths of the earth, as well as special magic. This community is financed by the Five Kingdoms of the Zozah Peninsula, in exchange for freely offering their services to the people, while keeping a neutral standing in their politics.

=== Alaira ===
Voiced by: Kotono Mitsuishi (Japanese); Cassie Ewulu (English)

Alaira (アライラ, Araira) is a dark-skinned senior witch and one of Qifrey's best friends, even after he left the Great Hall to strike out on his own. Her magic item is a Stretcher Skiff, a levitating cloth that she uses to carry injured people, made from the repurposed underside of her cloak.

=== Beldaruit ===
Beldaruit (ベルダルート, Berudarūto), known by the title "Wise in Teachings", is a high mage and member of the Three Wise Ones, the Great Hall's ruling council. Suffering from brittle bones, he utilizes a walking chair for locomotion, and likes to cloak his presence with illusions. His playful and seemingly scatter-brained personality hide a sharp intellect. He was once Qifrey's teacher and thus knows about his faults, and has offered to teach Coco to keep her out of her tutor's plotting against the Brimmed Caps.

=== Lagrah ===
Lagrah (ラグラ, Ragura) is the new Wise in Friendships, the High Council's diplomat and successor of the previous sage Engendale after the latter's disgrace.

=== Sinocia ===
Sinocia (シノーシア, Shinōshia) is a friendly and caring doctor who specializes in treating witches. She works at the Healing Spire within the Great Hall.

=== Ermile ===
Ermile (エルマイル, Erumairu) is one of the outsiders working as a doctor within the Healing Spire together with Sinocia and the other doctors employed there. She is tall and strong, with short blonde hair and light green earrings.

=== Kukrow ===
Voiced by: Hiroshi Yanaka (Japanese); Barry Yandell (English)

Kukrow (クックロウ, Kukkurō) is a disparaging, irresponsible sorcerer and Euini's former mentor.

=== Riliphin ===
Voiced by: Mariya Ise (Japanese); Ciarán Strange (English)

Riliphin (リリフィン, Ririfin) is Richeh's older brother and Beldaruit's current assistant. Kept apart from his sister by his abusive former teacher, he eventually reunites with her during the curtain leech crisis.

=== Adina Arklaum ===
Voiced by: N/A (Japanese); Colleen Clinkenbeard (English)

Adina Arklaum (アディナ・アークロム, Adina Ākuromu) is Agott's mother and Chief Librarian in the Tower of Tomes, the Great Hall's main magical library.

=== Atwert ===
Atwert (アトワート, Atowāto) is Galga's lover, who later takes him in as his apprentice after Galga has had his memories erased.

=== Hiehart ===
Hiehart (ハイハート, Haihāto) is a dark-skinned male witch who idolizes Olruggio. He is loud, expressive, and has a strong personality. He is Jujy's master.

=== Jujy ===
Jujy (ジュジー, Jujī) is a dark-skinned apprentice witch training under Hiehart. She has light grey eyes and curly black hair.

=== Loroga Roenton ===
Loroga Roenton (ロロガ・ロエントン, Roroga Roenton) is a young witch apprentice and a former peer of Agott who is deeply jealous of her talents.

=== The Knights Moralis ===
Also known as the Order of Moral Spellcasting, the Knights Moralis (魔警騎士団, Makei Kishi-dan) is a subsidiary agency to the Great Hall—specifically, its law enforcement branch. Its members are assigned to track any abuse of magic and bring the perpetrators to justice.

==== Vinanna ====
Vinanna (ヴィナンナ) is the current Wise in Principles. Founder and captain of the Knights Moralis. She is responsible for adjudicating transgressions of magic law. Vinanna wears the same uniform as the Knights Morails, but with an extra pair of wings on her hat.

==== Luluci ====
Voiced by: Yui Ishikawa (Japanese); Natalie Van Sistine (English)

Luluci (ルルシィ, Rurushyi) is a leading member of the Knights Moralis, who is quietly stern but—contrary to some of her colleagues—moderate-minded and empathic. When she was young, Luluci and her best friend Eryenne were victims of a sexual assault by a local lord, which was brushed off by her master, who was friends with the offender and was later arrested for it by the Great Hall, prompting her to join the Knights. The sight of others getting similarly harassed is the only thing which can break down her usually serene facade. After Easthies' self-inflicted disgrace and arrest, Vinanna offers Luluci his position, which she refuses, feeling not worthy of it.

==== Easthies ====
Voiced by: Junichi Suwabe (Japanese); Sean Letourneau (English)

Easthies (イースヒース, Īsuhīsu) is the stern, dispassionate, by-the-book field deputy captain of the Knight Moralis, and Vinanna's former apprentice. During the Curtain Leech crisis, he indiscriminately attacks his fellow witches, including Vinanna, when they attempt to use forbidden magic on the leech despite the fact that this would be the only way to defeat it, which leads to his arrest.

==== Utowin ====
Voiced by: Jun Kasama (Japanese); Gary Furlong (English)

Utowin (ウトウィン) is a brash, easy-going member of the Knights Moralis whose attitude masks a lingering feeling of self-deprecation. He is from Ghodrey, City of Magic in the north, like Olruggio.

==== Galga ====
Voiced by: Hiroki Yasumoto (Japanese); Major Attaway (English)

Galga (ガルガ, Garuga) is a member of the Knights Moralis, and Atwert's lover. Appearing aloof, he is really a quiet and simple man. He had his mind wiped permanently by Ininia and was about to be exiled by the Wise Ones to a solitary island called Adanlee, whereupon Atwert takes him in as his apprentice to care for him.

==== Ekoh and Etlan ====
Ekoh (エコー, Ekō) and Etlan (エトラン, Etoran) are twin juvenile Knight apprentices who have yet to take their profession seriously. Ekoh is the more dominant and impulsive twin, while Etlan, the older brother, is more serious.

== Ezrest ==
Ezrest (エズレスト, Ezuresuto) is the largest city in all of the Zozah Peninsula and its de facto capital.

=== King Deanreldy Ezrest ===
King Deanreldy Ezrest (ディンレルディ・エズレスト, Dinrerudi Ezuresuto) is the head of the royal family and the sovereign ruler of the Zozah Peninsula who wishes to learn magic to improve his people's lives, despite not knowing its secret.

=== Prince Eoleo Ezrest ===
Prince Eoleo Ezrest (エオウレオウ・エズレスト, Eōreō Ezuresuto) is the king's young son and heir to the throne, who adores magic but, due to his social rank, is forbidden from getting into closer contact with it. He keeps a black Brushbuddy as a pet and develops a strong liking for Tetia.

=== Queen Zayamaia Ezrest ===
Queen Zayamaia Ezrest (ザヤマイア・エズレスト, Zayamaia Ezuresuto) is the matriarch of the Ezrest royal family and the loving wife of King Deanreldy.

== Balanan Islands ==
The Balanan Islands, also known as the Pillars at World's End, are a group of rocky islands at the edge of the Sea of Waddaph. The islands are the nesting grounds of a population of dragons that are generally friendly towards humans. Some dragons bond with humans, allowing them to ride them. Hence, the islands are also known as the Dragon-Rider Islands.

=== Renelayne ===
Renelayne (レネレイン, Renerein) is a dark-skinned woman from the Dragon-Rider Islands. She acts as a ferrywoman between the islands and the mainland. She rescued Qifrey and Olruggio after they were harassed by the dragon population following an inquisitive visit to the island.

=== Gwing Balanan ===
Gwing Balanan (グウィン・バラナン, Gūin Baranan) is the current political leader of the Dragon-Rider Islands. Although he is shy around strangers, he must call on Qifrey, Hiehart, and their students when he discovers that the number of migrating dragons has decreased every year.

== Other characters ==
=== Coco's Mother ===
Voiced by: Mayumi Sako (Japanese); Stephanie Young (English)

Coco's mother: She is a dedicated tailor who raised Coco by herself after the death of her husband. She is petrified because of the effects of an unknown, forbidden magic.

=== Nolnoa ===
Voiced by: Yoshito Yasuhara (Japanese); Kent Williams (English)

Nolnoa (ノルノア, Norunoa) is an elderly maker of magical stationery (pens and inks) residing in the town of Kalhn.

=== Tartah ===
Voiced by: Mutsumi Tamura (Japanese); Emily Neves (English)

Tartah (タータ, Tāta) is Nolnoa's grandson and assistant in the shop. He suffers from silverwash, a rare sight condition which makes him effectively colorblind and thus initially unable to use magic because certain effects rely on ink tinctures differentiated by their color. After Coco helps him by teaching him magic with which to circumvent his disability, he grows close to her and creates a custom-made pen for her.

=== Euini ===
Voiced by: Hiiro Ishibashi (Japanese); Justin Briner (English)

Euini (ユイニィ, Yuinyi) is a nervous young witch apprentice, and originally Kukrow's student. During an advancement test in which some of Qifrey's students were also participating, he is kidnapped by the Brimmed Caps, who etch a magical sigil into his skin, permanently turning him into a scaled wolf. However, with the help of Coco, Agott and Richeh, he receives a talisman which reverses the transformation while worn. Because his tattoo makes him eligible for mind erasure by the Knights Moralis—despite his victimization—he has gone underground with Alaira, who has become his new tutor. He has also formed a bond with Richeh, which has become her primary motivation to expand her studies in order to help him.

=== Dagda ===
Voiced by: Katsuyuki Konishi (Japanese); Alex Hom (English)

Dagda (ダグダ, Daguda) is a wandering minstrel and Custas' foster father. He originally died, but was bestowed with a Time Reversal Tattoo which reset his life and memories. After seeing Custas being consumed by a parasitic tree, and after asking Luluci to take him in as her apprentice, he sacrifices himself by letting his injuries kill again, the stress to Custas causing his infection to recede.

=== Richeh's master ===
Voiced by: Yōji Ueda (Japanese); Michael Johnson (English)

Richeh's former master is a strict and domineering mage, who disregards Richeh's individuality.

=== Engendale ===
Engendale (エンゲンディル, Engendiru) is an elderly male witch and the former Wise in Friendships who was apprehended by the Knights Moralis for his illicit use of magic for personal profit. Instead of having his memory erased, he was imprisoned by the Great Hall. He frees himself by using a fellow prisoner as bait for a monstrous Curtain Leech, which then attacks the assembled witches at a national festival. After trying to kill Qifrey and Coco when they discover his escape, thereby striking Coco with a scar on her cheek, he is overwhelmed and apprehended by Qifrey.
