= Sword Gai =

Japanese manga and anime series

- First tankōbon volume cover

ソードガイ (Sōdo Gai)
- Genre: Dark fantasy
- Manga
- Written by: Toshiki Inoue
- Illustrated by: Keita Amemiya (characters); Wosamu Kine (scenario)
- Published by: Hero's Inc.
- Magazine: Monthly Hero's
- Original run: November 1, 2012 – June 1, 2019
- Volumes: 13
- Series titles
- 1. Sword Gai (2012–15, 6 volumes); 2. Sword Gai Evolve (2015–19, 7 volumes)
- Original net animation

Sword Gai: The Animation
- Directed by: Takahiro Ikezoe (chief); Tomohito Naka
- Written by: Toshiki Inoue
- Music by: Kotaro Nakagawa
- Studio: LandQ Studios
- Licensed by: Netflix (streaming); Sentai Filmworks (home video)
- Released: March 23, 2018 (1–12); July 30, 2018 (13–24)
- Runtime: 22 minutes
- Episodes: 24
- icon

Sword Gai (Japanese: ソードガイ, Hepburn: Sōdo Gai) is a Japanese manga series written by Toshiki Inoue with original character design by Keita Amemiya and scenario by Wosamu Kine. The first twelve episodes ("Part I") of an anime adaptation titled Sword Gai: The Animation were released on Netflix worldwide on March 23, 2018. Part II was released on July 30, 2018.

== Plot ==
Gai is a young man who is an apprentice to the blacksmith Amon, who found him as a newborn with the legendary katana Shiryū, revealed to be one of many cursed weapons found worldwide that turn their wielder, who is known as a Chrysalis, into a thrall who embodies their murderous impulses. On the night Amon found Gai, the katana had sent one of its keepers on one such murderous spree with it, during which he confronted Gai’s parents. After killing Gai’s father, Gai’s mother, who was pregnant with him, used Shiryū to kill the attacker and committed suicide rather than be consumed herself by the weapon’s bloodlust. After Gai loses his right arm when a ceremony to subdue Shiryū goes wrong, Amon forges it into a prosthetic limb for Gai. What makes matters worse is a Chrysalis will gradually lose their humanity until finally transforming into armored monsters called Busoma, making them that much harder to stop. Becoming a Chrysalis with the ability to fuse with his weapon, Gai attempts to retain his humanity while fighting the Busoma, whose drive to seek combat threatens to exterminate humanity.

== Characters ==
Gai Ogata (緒方 凱)
Voiced by: Yūto Uemura (Japanese); Khoi Dao (English)
User of Demonic Sword Shiryū. When he was born, his mother committed suicide to avoid being consumed by Shiryū's bloodlust. Soon after, Amon found and adopted him, taking him in as his apprentice. After losing his right arm in a failed ceremony meant to subdue Shiryū, he gains the ability to fuse with it after Amon forges it into a prosthetic limb to replace his arm.
Seiya Ichijō (一条晴也)
Voiced by: Yuichiro Umehara (Japanese); Billy Kametz (English)
User of Chakram.
Sayaka Ogata (緒方 さやか)
Voiced by: Yuka Aisaka (Japanese); Kayli Mills (English)
Amon's daughter.
Amon Ogata (緒方 亜門)
Voiced by: Jouji Nakata (Japanese); Taylor Henry (English)
Gai's adoptive father, who adopted him during infancy and took him in as his apprentice following his mother's death.
Kigetsu
Voiced by: Masaharu Sato (Japanese); John DeMita (English)
Naoki Miki (三木 直樹)
Voiced by: Tomokazu Sugita (Japanese); Greg Chun (English)
User of Fallgon Sword.
Marcus Lithos (マーカス・リートス)
Voiced by: Hiro Shimono (Japanese); Zach Aguilar (English)
User of Azoth Sword.
Mina Haraya
Voiced by: Yu Shimamura (Japanese); Mela Lee (English)
Takuma Miura (三浦 琢磨)
Voiced by: Toshihiko Seki (Japanese); Patrick Seitz (English)
Former administrator of the Shoshidai, User of Zsoltgewinn.
Kyōka Kagami (鏡 京香)
Voiced by: Rina Satou (Japanese); Erica Lindbeck (English)
Current administrator of the Shoshidai.
Midoriko
Voiced by: Ayane Sakura (Japanese); Faye Mata (English)
An Underground Idol and User of Flanberge Sword.
Yasuko Tanaka
Voiced by: Urara Takano (Japanese); Jessica Gee (English)
User of Gallon's Hammer.
Issei Ariga
Voiced by: Kohei Murakami (Japanese); Steve Staley (English)
User of Nebestigma.
Arnys
Voiced by: Michiko Neya (Japanese); Michelle Ruff (English)
Shin Matoba
Voiced by: Nobunaga Shimazaki (Japanese); Griffin Burns (English)
Kazuma Matoba
Voiced by: Takaya Hahi (Japanese); Richard Epcar (English)
Rie Matoba
Voiced by: Maria Naganawa (Japanese); Xanthe Huynh (English)
Kuromaru
Voiced by: Ayumu Murase (Japanese); Laura Stahl (English)
Kagatsuka
Voiced by: Junichi Yanagita (Japanese); Jordan Reynolds (English)
Himiko
Voiced by: Maaya Uchida (Japanese); Lauren Landa (English)
Leader of the Gabi.
Kazumo
Voiced by: Kazuyuki Okitsu (Japanese); Xander Mobus (English)
Grimms (グリムス)
Voiced by: Takaya Kuroda (Japanese); Chris Tergliafera (English)
Hakim
Voiced by: Kousuke Toriumi (Japanese); Chris Hackney (English)
Tatsumi
Voiced by: Kenji Hamada (Japanese); Austin Lee Matthews (English)
Kiyomi
Voiced by: Hitomi Harada (Japanese); Cristina Vee (English)
Kei
Voiced by: Sumi Shimamoto (Japanese); Philece Sampler (English)

== Media ==
=== Manga ===
Written by Toshiki Inoue and illustrated by Keita Amemiya (characters) and Wosamu Kine (scenario), Sword Gai started in Hero's Inc.'s seinen manga magazine Monthly Hero's from November 1, 2012, to September 1, 2015. Shogakukan Creative collected its chapters in six tankōbon volumes, released from June 5, 2013, to November 5, 2015.

A direct sequel by the same author, titled Sword Gai Evolve (ソードガイ エヴォルヴ, Sōdo Gai Evolve), was serialized in the same magazine from October 31, 2015, to June 1, 2019. Its chapters were collected in seven tankōbon volumes, released from May 22, 2016, to August 5, 2019.

=== Anime ===
An anime adaptation originally developed by DLE and Fields was scheduled to air in April 2016, but it was delayed indefinitely until Netflix streamed the series worldwide on March 23, 2018. Tomohito Naka directed the series while Takahiro Ikezoe served as the chief director, Inoue himself handled series composition and wrote the episode scripts, Atsuko Nakajima designed the characters, Toshiki Kameyama was the sound designer, and Kotaro Nakagawa composed the music. Sword Gai: The Animation was animated by LandQ Studios. The opening theme song is "Sadame Goto" (サダメゴト, What is Predestined) by Yūto Uemura. Sentai Filmworks will release the series on home video.

==== Episodes ====
===== Season 1 =====
No.	Title	Original release date
1	"Episode 1"	March 23, 2018
Shoshidai, an organization tasked with collecting cursed weaponry, dispatches two of its agents to retrieve the legendary Demon Sword Zsoltgewinn.
2	"Episode 2"	March 23, 2018
An abandoned baby boy is adopted and named Gai by swordsmith Amon. He becomes an apprentice, later losing his arm in a ritual gone horribly wrong.
3	"Episode 3"	March 23, 2018
After acquiring the Azoth Sword, Miki is ambushed by Marcus and Miura. Amon forges a prosthetic arm out of the sword Shiryu to replace Gai's lost limb.
4	"Episode 4"	March 23, 2018
With his soul possessed by a demonic spear, Tatsumi transforms into a monstrous entity called a Busoma. Miki takes Marcus to Shoshidai headquarters.
5	"Episode 5"	March 23, 2018
The Shoshidai reawaken their most powerful Chrysalis, Seiya Ichijo. After Gai's powers partially awaken, his mind reverts to that of an infant.
6	"Episode 6"	March 23, 2018
Ichijo attempts to test Gai's potential as a Chrysalis but is interrupted by a member of the Gabi, a group that has long fought Busoma.
7	"Episode 7"	March 23, 2018
With Gai in tow, Ichijo heads to Shoshidai headquarters before stopping to meet his lover, Kei. A mysterious sword appears before gamer Midoriko.
8	"Episode 8"	March 23, 2018
A wealthy widow hires a search vessel to find the lost treasure of pirate Throlla, who reportedly also kept a mythical weapon known as Gallon's Hammer.
9	"Episode 9"	March 23, 2018
Miki and Marcus are sent on a covert mission by the Shoshidai to infiltrate and retrieve an ancient weapon of the fairy world: the legendary Halberd.
10	"Episode 10"	March 23, 2018
A depressed Sayaka questions Amon about Gai's motives. Meanwhile, Ichijo reveals to Gai how he came to harness the power of the Chakram.
11	"Episode 11"	March 23, 2018
After Gai is safely brought to Shoshidai headquarters, Ichijo is ordered by Kagami to cold sleep due to his rapidly progressing change into a Busoma.
12	"Episode 12"	March 23, 2018
Shoshidai's new weapons are no match against the demonic powers of Zsoltgewinn, pitting Ichijo and Gai against Miura in a fierce battle.

===== Season 2 =====
No.	Title	Original release date
13	"Episode 1"	July 30, 2018
With the long-fought battle against Miura's Zsoltgewinn coming to a dramatic end, Gai must now fulfill a promise he made with Ichijo.
14	"Episode 2"	July 30, 2018
Although content with his missions for Shoshidai and relationship with his girlfriend, Marcus senses something is not right after his date with Aya.
15	"Episode 3"	July 30, 2018
With a Busoma running rampant outside Shoshidai headquarters, Kagami reawakens three Chyrsalises from cold sleep to neutralize the hostile threat.
16	"Episode 4"	July 30, 2018
Himiko, leader of the Gabi, locates the Busoma responsible for her comrade Soin's death. Kagami is ordered to stand down against Marcus' Azoth.
17	"Episode 5"	July 30, 2018
Under the care of the Gabi, Gai dedicates himself to meditation and receives a new prosthetic arm. A bullied kid seeks help from an unlikely source.
18	"Episode 6"	July 30, 2018
Shin undergoes a risky procedure to rid his body of the core alma. Kuromaru takes a liking to Gai after Gai rescues him from attack.
19	"Episode 7"	July 30, 2018
Shoshidai sends three Chrysalises to kill Miura's Zsoltgewinn, but Kyoka begs them to use their prototype vaccine on her father to save him instead.
20	"Episode 8"	July 30, 2018
The true reason for the Shosidai-sponsored hospitalization of Rie and the others is revealed. Shin and Ogata ask Kuromaru to take them to meet Gai.
21	"Episode 9"	July 30, 2018
Shin makes a grim discovery at the hospital where Rie resides. Meanwhile, both Yasuko and Arnys pay a visit to Isse who has left the Shoshidai.
22	"Episode 10"	July 30, 2018
With his resentment towards Gai intensifying, Shin resolves to devote himself to combating the Busoma as a Chyrsalis.
23	"Episode 11"	July 30, 2018
Gai's awakening unleashes chaos into the world. Busoma Zsoltegewinn in Miura's human form appears before Arnon and Kigetsu.
24	"Episode 12"	July 30, 2018
With the all-powerful Grimms looking on, Gai and Shin face-off in a ferocious battle, wielding their respective Shiryus against one another.
