= LandQ Studios =

Japanese animation studio

LandQ Studios Co., Ltd.
- Native name: 株式会社ランドック・スタジオ
- Romanized name: Kabushiki-gaisha Randokku Sutajio
- Type: Private KK
- Industry: Anime
- Founded: July 2009; 17 years ago
- Founder: Shinji Suzuki
- Headquarters: Yayoicho, Nakano, Tokyo, Japan
- Number of employees: 54
- Website: landq.co.jp

LandQ Studios Co., Ltd. (Japanese: 株式会社ランドック・スタジオ, Hepburn: Kabushiki-gaisha Randokku Sutajio) is a Japanese animation studio that was founded in July 2009 by former Gonzo producer Shinji Suzuki, based in Nakano, Tokyo.

== Works ==
=== Television series ===
Title	Director(s)	First run Start date	First run End date	Eps	Note(s)	Ref(s)
Leiji Matsumoto's Ozma	Ryosuke Takahashi	March 16, 2012	April 21, 2012	6	Based on an original story created by Leiji Matsumoto; Co-produced by Gonzo	
Chiuran ½	Fumie Moroi	January 9, 2017	March 28, 2017	12	Based on the manga series of the same name written by Shinji Uemura and illustrated by Eiji Hashimoto	
Bem	Yoshinori Oda	July 14, 2019	October 13, 2019	12	Original work Part of the Humanoid Monster Bem franchise by ADK Emotions	
Sylvanian Families: Freya's Happy Diary	Shimmei Kawahara	October 7, 2022	December 29, 2022	12	Based on the Sylvanian Families toyline by Epoch	
Sylvanian Families: Freya's Go for Dream	Shimmei Kawahara	July 6, 2023	October 5, 2023	13	Sequel to Sylvanian Families: Freya's Happy Diary	
Sylvanian Families: Freya's Piece of Secret	Shimmei Kawahara	November 21, 2024	December 26, 2024	6	Sequel to Sylvanian Families: Freya's Go for Dream	
Betrothed to My Sister's Ex	Takayuki Kitagawa	July 5, 2025	September 20, 2025	12	Based on the light novel series of the same name written by Tobirano and illustrated by Mai Murasaki	
Sylvanian Families: Freya's Happy Days	Shimmei Kawahara	October 2, 2025	TBA	12	Sequel to Sylvanian Families: Freya's Go for Dream	

=== Films ===
Title	Director(s)	Release	Note(s)	Ref(s)
Tokyo 7th Sisters: Bokura wa Aozora ni Naru	Takayuki Kitagawa	February 26, 2021	Based on the video game Tokyo 7th Sisters by Donuts; General production by Toei Animation	

=== Original net animation ===
Title	Director(s)	Release	Eps	Note(s)	Ref(s)
Sword Gai: The Animation	Takahiro Ikzoe (chief); Tomohito Naka	March 23, 2018	12	Based on the manga series Sword Gai by Toshiki Inoue	
Sword Gai: The Animation (part 2)	Takahiro Ikzoe (chief); Tomohito Naka	July 30, 2018	12	Part two of Sword Gai: The Animation	

=== Original video animation ===
Title	Director(s)	Release	Note(s)	Ref(s)
Azure Striker Gunvolt	Yoshinori Odaka	February 9, 2017	Based on the video game of the same name by Inti Creates	
