= Betrothed to My Sister's Ex =

Japanese light novel series

- First light novel volume cover

ずたぼろ令嬢は姉の元婚約者に溺愛される (Zutaboro Reijō wa Ane no Moto Konyakusha ni Dekiai Sareru)
- Genre: Romance
- Novel series
- Written by: Tobirano
- Published by: Shōsetsuka ni Narō
- Original run: October 23, 2019 – present
- Light novel
- Written by: Tobirano
- Illustrated by: Mai Murasaki
- Published by: Futabasha
- English publisher: NA: Seven Seas Entertainment
- Imprint: M Novels f
- Original run: April 15, 2020 – present
- Volumes: 10
- Manga
- Written by: Tobirano
- Illustrated by: Chikage Nakakura
- Published by: Futabasha
- English publisher: NA: Pocket Comics (digital); Seven Seas Entertainment
- Imprint: Monster Comics
- Magazine: Gaugau Monster
- Original run: July 24, 2020 – present
- Volumes: 10
- Anime television series
- Directed by: Takayuki Kitagawa
- Written by: Kenta Ihara
- Music by: Kujira Yumemi
- Studio: LandQ Studios
- Licensed by: Crunchyroll: SEA: Tropics Entertainment
- Original network: MBS, TBS, CBC, BS-TBS
- Original run: July 5, 2025 – September 20, 2025
- Episodes: 12

Betrothed to My Sister's Ex (ずたぼろ令嬢は姉の元婚約者に溺愛される, Zutaboro Reijō wa Ane no Moto Konyakusha ni Dekiai Sareru; lit. 'Loved by Her Sister's Former Fiancé') is a Japanese light novel series written by Tobirano and illustrated by Mai Murasaki. It began serialization online in October 2019 on the user-generated novel publishing website Shōsetsuka ni Narō. It was later acquired by Futabasha, who have published ten volumes since April 2020 under their M Novels f imprint. A manga adaptation with art by Chikage Nakakura has been serialized online via Futabasha's Gaugau Monster website since July 2020 and has been collected in ten tankōbon volumes. An anime television series adaptation produced by LandQ Studios aired from July to September 2025.

== Premise ==
Marie was abused and taken advantage of her entire life by her parents, resulting in her lack of self-esteem. On her birthday, her parents present her sister Anastasia as the star of the evening; leading her to stay in the garden to avoid attention. This leads to her meeting duke Kyros, who falls in love with Marie due to her sweet personality. However, because of the misunderstanding caused by her parents, Marie's name gets mixed up with her sister's when Kyros sends his marriage proposal. Anastasia goes missing and is presumed dead when heading to Kyros's home; resulting in Marie being sent to comfort him. Kyros realizes his mistake with the sisters names, but Marie cannot understand it herself; resulting in a very long struggle to break her out of her mindset.

== Characters ==
Marie Shaderan (マリー, Marī)
Voiced by: Rena Motomura
The heroine, who lived through hardships similar to that of Cinderella. Having spent her life being called ugly and stupid, Marie struggles to understand that Anastasia was never whom Kyros wished to marry; despite him explaining to her outright that he simply got their names crossed. She is meek around others and tries to conform to what she thinks is appropriate, which only makes things worse for her; everyone at Kyros's estate cannot figure out what she likes in order to help her adjust better. However, as she spends more time free of her parents' abuse, Marie begins to discover how much she enjoys being free to choose.
She had been running her family's estate due to her father being too incompetent to fulfill his duties. All the abuse she suffered was to keep Marie from feeling capable of leaving.
Kyros Granado (キュロス グラナド, Kyurosu Gurando)
Voiced by: Daiki Hamano
The duke whom fell in love with Marie. He was born to his father's foreign mistress Liu-Liu, while the official duchess never bore a son. With the untimely demise of his father, along with Kyros's own accomplishments on the battlefield, he became the next duke without any backlash. He's loathed noble women who only ever wanted to marry him for status, which is why he was so drawn to Marie; she didn't care about status and had a caring heart. Even though he repeatedly explains to Marie that he got their names mixed up, Kyros is left frustrated with her being unable to accept that she is not a replacement for her sister. This comedically leads to him showering her in unnecessary gifts and learning Marie has no clue as to how to choose what she likes on her own.
Kyros ultimately decides to bring the abuse Marie has suffered to the public eye, believing it will also help save her homeland from her father's incompetence.
Anastasia Shaderan (アナスタジア, Anasutajia)
Voiced by: Minami Tanaka
Marie's older sister. She was close to Marie as a child, but her parents forced them apart in order begin conditioning Marie into being their slave; while pampering Anastasia to make her ignore what was going on. Anastasia noticed the horrible things, but because she took Marie's word that she was fine, she tried to ignore it for years. Once the engagement to Kyros arrived, Anastasia could tell from the dress sent as a gift that he had gotten her and Marie's names mixed up. She used the carriage ride to run away and hide out as a boy, getting a job as an apprentice tailor.
Luifon (ルイフォン, Ruifon)
Voiced by: Ryōhei Kimura
Mio (ミオ)
Voiced by: Yoko Hikasa
Head maid of Kyros's household. She is polite and very no-nonsense, but looks after Marie with kindness; seeing she has such poor self-esteem that she has to constant direct her into not overreacting. Within the early days of her serving Marie, Mio fires two maids sent by to be the ladies-in-waiting; they had been exacerbating Marie's confidence issues in a long term plot to become Kyros's mistresses. Mio often investigates or goes undercover to find information for Kyros, leading to her leaving the estate to learn more about Marie's background.
Liu-Liu (リュー・リュー, Ryū Ryū)
Voiced by: Sayaka Ohara
Kyros's mother and the mistress of his late father. She is on bad terms with the duchess, due to their husband dying before the duchess could conceive an heir; while Liu-Liu had Kyros. While she is fluent in both her native and the local language, she has trouble writing and reading the latter. Liu-Liu likes Marie and makes the effort, along with Kyros and Mio, to help her get past her self-doubts. When Marie explained she did most of the talking and paperwork for her father, Liu-Liu realized that the entire reason that her parents didn't want her to go was because they couldn't do the work themselves.
Liu-Liu can often be found in the library, where she bonds with Marie over their love of literature.
Toppo (トッポ)
Voiced by: Tetsuya Kakihara
The chef of Kyros' household. He is a large and very emotional man who tends to cry frequently and is easily moved by praise of his cooking. He tends to cook in excessive amounts, due to having a larger eating capacity.
Thomas (トマス, Tomasu)
Voiced by: Tatsuyuki Kobayashi
Tunica (チュニカ, Chunika)
Voiced by: Yūka Aisaka

== Media ==
=== Light novel ===
Written by Tobirano, Betrothed to My Sister's Ex began serialization on the user-generated novel publishing website Shōsetsuka ni Narō on October 23, 2019. It was later acquired by Futabasha who began publishing the series with illustrations by Mai Murasaki under their M Novels f light novel imprint on April 15, 2020. Ten volumes (including eight volumes published digital-only) have been released as of May 2026.

In April 2025, Seven Seas Entertainment announced that they had licensed the series for English publication beginning in January 2026.

No.	Original release date	Original ISBN	English release date	English ISBN
1	April 15, 2020	978-4-575-24267-6	December 11, 2025 (digital); January 20, 2026 (print)	979-8-89561-749-6
2	September 15, 2020	978-4-575-24324-6	April 2, 2026 (digital); May 5, 2026 (print)	979-8-89561-750-2
3	February 10, 2022 (ebook)	—	July 23, 2026 (digital); September 8, 2026 (print)	979-8-89561-751-9
4	August 7, 2022 (ebook)	—	January 12, 2027 (print)	979-8-89765-576-2
5	February 10, 2023 (ebook)	—	—	—
6	August 10, 2023 (ebook)	—	—	—
7	May 10, 2024 (ebook)	—	—	—
8	January 10, 2025 (ebook)	—	—	—
9	August 8, 2025 (ebook)	—	—	—
10	May 7, 2026 (ebook)	—	—	—

=== Manga ===
A manga adaptation illustrated by Chikage Nakakura began serialization on Futabasha's Gaugau Monster website on July 24, 2020. The manga's chapters have been collected into eleven tankōbon volumes as of July 2026. The manga adaptation is published digitally in English on Comico's Pocket Comics website. In April 2025, Seven Seas Entertainment announced that they had also licensed the manga adaptation for English publication beginning in January 2026.

No.	Original release date	Original ISBN	English release date	English ISBN
1	January 15, 2021	978-4-575-41197-3	January 20, 2026	979-8-89561-752-6
2	July 15, 2021	978-4-575-41276-5	May 12, 2026	979-8-89561-753-3
3	January 14, 2022	978-4-575-41353-3	July 21, 2026	979-8-89561-754-0
4	July 8, 2022	978-4-575-41454-7	October 20, 2026	979-8-89561-755-7
5	February 10, 2023	978-4-575-41566-7	—	—
6	August 10, 2023	978-4-575-41704-3	—	—
7	April 10, 2024	978-4-575-41858-3	—	—
8	December 25, 2024	978-4-575-42044-9	—	—
9	June 25, 2025	978-4-575-42176-7	—	—
10	December 25, 2025	978-4-575-42309-9	—	—
11	July 10, 2026	978-4-575-42458-4	—	—

=== Anime ===
An anime television series adaptation was announced on July 29, 2024. It is produced by LandQ Studios and directed by Takayuki Kitagawa, with series composition and episode screenplays handled by Kenta Ihara, characters designed by Akiko Satō, and music composed by Kujira Yumemi. The series aired from July 5 to September 20, 2025, on the Animeism programming block on MBS, TBS, CBC and BS-TBS. (Note: MBS, TBS and CBC lists the series premiere on July 4, 2025, at 25:53, which is effectively July 5 at 1:53 a.m. JST.) The opening theme song is "Gesshoku" (月蝕; Lunar Eclipse), performed by Krage, while the ending theme song is "Marie" (マリー, Marī), performed by Myuk. Crunchyroll is streaming the series. Tropics Entertainment licensed the series in Southeast Asia for streaming on the Tropics Anime Asia YouTube channel.

==== Episodes ====
No.	Title	Directed by	Storyboarded by	Original release date
1	"I Could Never Replace My Sister"; Transliteration: "Ō Ane-sama no Kawarida Nante Zettai Muridesu" (Japanese: お姉様の代わりだなんて絶対無理です)	Takayuki Kitagawa	Takayuki Kitagawa	July 5, 2025
Marie is the daughter of Baron Shaderan and lives in the shadow of her older sister Anastasia who is treated like a princess. Their estate is poor and it is often left to Marie to handle her father's paperwork. Marie's birthday is overlooked in favour of a party for Anastasia so she can find a husband. The only one to show concern for Marie is Anastasia herself. Crying in the garden Marie meets Lord Kyros who is surprised Marie has studied his Ipsandros culture. Later, Kyros sends a letter asking to marry Anastasia, disappointing her as Kyros has a reputation of hating women. Marie is surprised Anastasia has actually spent years learning to make clothes and dreams of opening a shop in the capital. On the way to Kyros' estate Anastasia's carriage gets into an accident and her body is never found. Having already sold Kyros' betrothal gifts Shaderan insists Marie seduce Kyros instead. At Kyros' estate head maid Mio is shocked to see Marie alive and it transpires Kyros thought Marie was Anastasia, and it was Marie he actually wanted to marry. Marie realises she has somehow become Kyros' fiancée. Kyros' mother Liu-Liu diagnoses Marie as lacking confidence and decides to help her find some before the wedding. Marie suddenly claims she can't marry him.
2	"Marie, I Want to Marry You"; Transliteration: "Ore wa Marī o Metoritai" (Japanese: 俺はマリーを娶りたい)	Masahito Otani (Tomason) & Takayuki Kitagawa	Takayuki Kitagawa	July 12, 2025
Kyros blames Shaderan for making Anastasia the centre of attention at Marie's birthday, leading to him mixing up their identities. It is explained his father Duke Granado had two wives, Duchess Laura who only gave birth to daughters, and Liu-Liu his Ipsandros mistress who gave birth to Kyros. When the Duke chose Kyros as heir, Laura killed herself. Liu-Liu chose to raise Kyros by herself and over the years he developed a dislike for noble ladies who only wanted to marry him for his title. Seeking a loveless marriage of convenience Kyros sought out the daughter of a poor noble and was surprised to meet Marie. Having made an appalling first impression, Mio demands Kyros fix it. He tries to apologise, but Marie can only believe Kyros sees her as a substitute for Anastasia, despite him clearly explaining mixing up their names in his letter. Marie agrees to the betrothal but asks if she can return home to receive instructions from Shaderan, having failed to seduce Kyros into bed like he ordered. Infuriated at Shaderan's outrageous behaviour Kyros forbids Marie from going for her own safety. The next morning Marie realises she has no chores to do, and in fact has personal maids Hannah and Ilza to care for her.
3	"A Life I Saw in a Dream, and a Dream-like Life"; Transliteration: "Yumemiteita Kurashi to, Yume no Yōna Kurashi" (Japanese: 夢みていた暮らしと、夢のような暮らし)	Masakazu Sunagawa	Masakazu Sunagawa	July 19, 2025
Marie is excited Hannah and Ilza came from the royal palace and might have interesting stories, but something about them reminds her of her parents, scaring her. She is given a manor house in the castle grounds and learns Kyros hires servants from multiple nations despite the kingdoms distrust of foreigners. Hannah and Ilza continue to make her worry about doing anything wrong. Kyros is annoyed his duties keep him away for days. Marie enjoys talking with the gardener Johan about his vegetable garden, but Hannah and Ilza's rude comments make Marie fear she has insulted Johan and disappointed Kyros. Kyros returns late that night and invites Marie to share his midnight snack, though head chef Toppo also seems disapproving. It turns out he is upset Marie leaves meals half uneaten as though she dislikes his food, when really Marie is unused to large meals and cannot eat it all. Kyros clears up the misunderstanding and asks if anything else makes her uncomfortable. Scared of Hannah and Ilza she claims to be happy. Kyros shows her a tea making ceremony from Ipsandros. Waiting for the tea they play a word game Marie used to play with Anastasia and Marie finds herself having fun until they accidentally embarrass themselves in front of Mio and ruin the tea.
4	"I've Found the Things I Like"; Transliteration: "Sukina Mono to Sukina Koto, Mitsukarimashita" (Japanese: 好きなものと好きなこと、見つかりました)	Kenichi Yatagai	Takayuki Kitagawa	July 26, 2025
Mio advises Kyros that showering Marie with gifts might be making her feel worse. Kyros must leave again on business, so he asks Mio to ensure Marie is comfortable. Mio chooses to misinterpret this as permission to get rid of anything that upsets Marie. Marie's parents send her a box of her belongings, most of them destroyed, which Hannah and Ilza ensure Marie sees. Now with evidence of their bullying Mio punishes them both. Marie manages to repurpose the clothes her mother ruined into gardening clothes, allowing her to spend time gardening with Johan. Mio decides to send Hannah and Ilza back to their former employer, third prince Luiphon. Outraged, they viciously insult Marie and reveal Luiphon sent them to Kyros to become his concubines after he grew bored with Marie. Disgusted, Kyros throws them off his lands and reassures Marie he could never be bored of her. They almost kiss but Mio interrupts to remind Kyros he is late for his trip. In Kyros' absence Marie receives a confusing invitation from Luiphon to attend a city-wide festival for her engagement at the Royal Knight's stronghold. Mio assures her Luiphon is not cruel, just childish. Despite Mio guarding her against potential pranks Luiphon still manages to get to Marie on her own and explain he and Kyros have been friends since childhood.
5	"The Prince and the Pitch-Black Warrior"; Transliteration: "Ōji-sama to Shikkoku no Senshi" (Japanese: 王子様と漆黒の戦士)	Masakazu Sunagawa	Masakazu Sunagawa	August 2, 2025
Luiphon invites Marie to watch the swordsmanship competition. An anonymous dark warrior performs well in the competition. Luiphon is surprised Marie doesn't find martial ability particularly impressive but she is fascinated by the dark warrior's compassion. Mio reveals the dark warrior is Kyros, embarrassing her and amusing Luiphon. Kyros is upset Luiphon manipulated events so Marie would see him fighting. Luiphon claims he was simply trying to prove they would make incompatible marriage partners. Both lose their tempers and decide to duel in the arena. Marie apologises to Kyros as Luiphon was right; she simply obeyed her father and agreed to marry Kyros as her sister's replacement. Kyros explains he will duel him anyway to force Luiphon to apologise for upsetting her. After a short duel Kyros defeats Luiphon. Kyros invites Marie into the arena and announces their engagement to the kingdom. Marie is nervous of being judged unworthy until she sees the audience cheering for her. Afterwards, Marie feels much closer to Kyros. Luiphon accepts Marie makes Kyros happy. Marie returns to the castle, but before leaving she impulsively kisses the shocked Kyros on the cheek. Kyros receives a letter from Marie's parents, casting doubt on whether Marie is their real daughter.
6	"Am I Enough As I Am?"; Transliteration: "Watashi wa Watashide Yoi Nodeshō ka……？" (Japanese: わたしはわたしで良いのでしょうか……？)	Shigeru Kimiya	Moe Katō	August 9, 2025
A month later Marie is much happier and employs Wolfgang and his granddaughter Caecile as butler and maid. Kyros returns after his long trip. Feeling anxious Marie helps Liu-Liu write invitations for her betrothal ceremony. Liu-Liu is surprised Marie learned languages from her grandmother and Shaderan's immigrant employees. It becomes clear Marie did the work managing Shaderan's lands, since Shaderan was too arrogant to learn the languages of his business associates. Mio's investigation confirms Marie is biological daughter of Shaderan and his wife Elvira, making their behaviour toward her even stranger. A letter arrives demanding Marie return home as Shaderan is dying. Kyros hides the letter in case Marie tries to visit him. After seeing Marie working with Liu-Liu Kyros realises he has been trying to hide Marie in his mansion when she deserves freedom. He shows her the letter but Marie instantly spots the handwriting is Shaderan's despite supposedly being on his deathbed. Marie has realised her parents abused her to keep her obedient and only value her for managing their business affairs. Kyros realises due to his long absence Marie has grown comfortable with the servants while remaining nervous around him. Mio travels with guard Thomas to investigate a letter supposedly sent to Marie by her six year old brother Cedric, claiming Anastasia miraculously reappeared.
7	"You're So Close, I Think You May Make Me Dizzy"; Transliteration: "Chikasugite, Memai ga Shisō desu" (Japanese: 近すぎて、目眩がしそうです)	Kenichi Yatagai, Akesada Kanikubo & Ryūhei Aoyagi	Takayuki Kitagawa	August 16, 2025
Given the circumstances of Anastasia's disappearance Mio has doubts about Cedric's letter. Trying to become closer to Marie Kyros dresses as a butler, only to earn Caecile's wrath when he tries to help Marie change clothes. Luiphon invites them both to the city for a surprise so Kyros asks Marie to make it their first date. Mio and Thomas find that around the time Anastasia disappeared one of Marie's classmates named Karina Burton also left for a job in the royal capital. Posing as Karina Mio visits Shaderan's mansion. Despite Shaderan's lies she learns Marie didn't even have a room in the main house, just a blanket in a storeroom. Mio overhears Elvira talking to Anastasia but Shaderan invents an excuse to make them leave. Mio breaks back into the mansion and discovers "Anastasia" is a life-size doll seemingly made with Anastasia's hair and the dress she wore the day she disappeared. From this she deduces the only witness, the driver of Anastasia's carriage, lied about what happened. During their date Marie thinks she hears Anastasia's voice but is distracted by a bully trying to ask her on a date. Kyros scares him away but realises Marie had no idea what the man wanted; since Shaderan trained her all her life to believe she was undesirable. Nearby, a boy watches them from an alley.
8	"A Gift More Lovely Than Jewels"; Transliteration: "Hōseki Yori Sutekina Okurimono" (Japanese: 宝石より素敵な贈り物)	Chie Yamashiro	Chie Yamashiro	August 23, 2025 (Note: This episode aired at 1:58 a.m. JST, 5 minutes after the original air time.)
Kyros and Marie meet Luiphon at a royal jewellery shop. Marie becomes enchanted by emerald offcuts; tiny fragments left behind after carving larger emeralds, so she buys several. For their betrothal Luiphon offers to sell them a rare red diamond, the largest in the world, since the royal family is secretly struggling for cash. Kyros agrees, since he had been looking for a red gem for Marie's engagement ring to match her hair. Marie presents Kyros with a hair ribbon, explaining her intention to embroider them with the offcuts to match his eyes. Marie spots the boy from the alley and is inexplicably reminded of Anastasia, sending her catatonic as she remembers she is only happy because she stole Anastasia's fiancé. Asleep, Marie remembers Anastasia reading their favourite book, The Raggedy Red Cat, in which a red cat must learn not to think of itself as trash, otherwise people will treat it like trash. She awakens in the castle with Kyros caring for her and misses her sister. She also realises her parents didn't start neglecting her until her Grandmother Sasha died. Tired of being afraid she confesses her love to Kyros and kisses him. Mio returns with Anastasia's carriage driver Jacob under arrest, shocking Marie when Kyros accuses him of Anastasia's murder.
9	"In Pursuit of Anastasia's Spirit"; Transliteration: "Anasutajia no Tamashī o tte" (Japanese: アナスタジアの魂を追って)	Takayuki Kitagawa & Masakazu Sunagawa	Royden B	August 30, 2025 (Note: This episode aired at 2:58 a.m. JST, 1 hour and 5 minutes after the original air time.)
Jacob admits he tried to molest Anastasia but she stabbed him, accidentally cutting off most of her hair then falling in the river that flows to the capital. To cover up his crime he fabricated a bandit attack and sold Anastasia's clothes and hair back to Elvira. Kyros apologises to Marie, having believed Anastasia was as abusive as her parents and deserved to die. A week later Marie finishes Kyros' new hair tie. Liu Liu restores Marie's damaged copy of The Raggedy Red Cat. Kyros presents a book of famous nobles which includes Marie's grandmother Sasha. Liu Liu reveals during a time of female oppression Sasha entered the military and eventually led a social revolution for women's rights. From Marie's description of the work Shaderan forced her to do Kyros deduces Shaderan can speak Flarian, the traditional language of the nobility, but he can't read or write it, unlike Marie. To test this he sends Shaderan a Ducal Summons in Flarian to see if he responds. Luiphon visits with Marie's engagement ring. Kyros is amazed Luiphon convinced the world famous jewelled button maker Smith Norman to come out of retirement to make the ring, though Luiphon claims it was easy as Normal recently took on a clothes-making apprentice, a street orphan. Marie has a sudden revelation of Anastasia's disappearance, the river that flows to the capital, a familiar looking boy on the streets of the capital and Anastasia's dream of making clothes.
10	"Please Call Off the Betrothal"; Transliteration: "Konyaku o Haki Shite Kudasai" (Japanese: 婚約を破棄してください)	Minoru Ueda	Minoru Ueda	September 6, 2025
Marie is certain Norman's apprentice Arthur might be Anastasia. Shaderan does not respond to the Ducal Summons so Kyros sends a carriage to fetch Shaderan by force. Kyros also summons Norman and Arthur to the mansion and discovers three years ago Norman suffered an accident to his eyes, limiting his vision. Arthur does not attend, claiming to be ill. Norman reveals Arthur always refused to discuss his past, except to claim he was "a raggedy red cat". Now certain Anastasia is alive, Marie convinces herself she is disgusting for finding happiness with Kyros when she thought Anastasia was dead. Against Kyros' objections she dissolves their engagement so he can marry Anastasia while she returns to Shaderan's house where she belongs. In the carriage Mio openly criticises Kyros for letting her go instead by fighting to make her stay. Marie realises she was a coward by refusing to accept Kyros love out of fear of losing him. She begs Mio to take her back, and Mio amusingly reveals they haven't left yet, she was just circling the gardens until Marie came to her senses. After an emotional reunion with Kyros, Marie reaffirms their engagement. Later Marie is attacked in the garden by a boy demanding directions to Marie's bedroom. The boy is easily apprehended by Kyros, revealing it is Anastasia.
11	"The Empty Princess Lives"; Transliteration: "Karappo Hime wa Ikiteiru" (Japanese: カラッポ姫は生きている)	Chie Yamashiro	Chie Yamashiro	September 13, 2025
Anastasia is surprised Marie is in love with Kyros, having heard Kyros was forcing her into marriage. Anastasia recalls after Sasha died of a secret terminal illness Elvira blamed Marie for catching a fever and passing it to Sasha and Anastasia was too scared to tell anyone it was terminal illness. Shaderan forced Marie to take over Sasha's work, abusing her to keep her obedient. When Anastasia was attacked by Jacob she dropped a rock into the river, making him think she jumped, and then ran all the way to the city. She met Norman and due to his eyesight convinced him she was Arthur. She eventually discovered Marie's circumstances when Luiphon brought in the red diamond, so she made her way to Kyros' mansion. At first she thought Kyros was an unscrupulous liar, but having met him she changes her opinion to hopeless pervert. She eventually accepts his love is genuine. Marie reveals something she figured out. Shaderan's inability to use Flarian, the noble language, is proof that every single document he made Sasha and Marie sign was an act of fraud, enough to charge him with abandoning his duties as Lord of his territory. Kyros leaves the decision to her what happens next and Marie decides to wait until after she has spoken to Shaderan, and hopefully scared him to death.
12	"It's Time to Settle This"; Transliteration: "Kecchaku no Jikandesu" (Japanese: 決着の時間です)	Takayuki Kitagawa	Takayuki Kitagawa	September 20, 2025
Kyros, Marie, Luiphon and Anastasia disguised as a boy, formally accuse Shaderan with abandoning his duties. Marie offers to let Shaderan keep the noble title and the house, but only if he apologises. Shaderan breaks down and claims he could never meet Sasha's expectations because she always treated him like a disappointment. Elvira continues to blame Marie and her cursed red hair, but Anastasia reveals herself, causing a scuffle that reveals Elvira's blonde hair was a wig hiding her red hair. Marie realises Elvira believes the old tales of red hair bringing misfortune, causing her to be jealous of while also worshipping Anastasia while hating Marie. Marie and Anastasia both reject the superstition, making Elvira cry. Kyros seizes Shaderan's lands and sends Cedric to school in the capital to learn how to be the next lord. Kyros also sends Shaderan to the same school to learn foreign languages with the promise if he graduates properly he can be Cedric's butler. Elvira remains in the mansion alone with her misery. Anastasia returns to working for Norman, as herself this time. Marie and Kyros hold their betrothal ceremony. Luiphon seems to take a genuine interest in Anastasia as he has never met a woman like her before. The night ends with a grand fireworks display as Marie and Kyros look forward to their future.

== See also ==
- Within the Villainess, another light novel series by the same illustrator
- I'm the Villainess, So I'm Taming the Final Boss, another light novel series by the same illustrator
