= Maebashi Witches =

Japanese anime television series

- Key visual

前橋ウィッチーズ (Maebashi Uitchīzu)
- Genre: Coming-of-age, Magical girl
- Created by: Sunrise
- Anime television series
- Directed by: Junichi Yamamoto
- Produced by: Shingo Ishizuka
- Written by: Erika Yoshida
- Music by: Yuri Habuka
- Studio: Sunrise
- Licensed by: Crunchyroll
- Original network: Tokyo MX, BS11, GTV, SUN, KBS Kyoto, TVA, HTB, SBS, RKB, EBC, YTS, UX, HAB, AAB, NCC, AT-X
- Original run: April 6, 2025 – June 22, 2025
- Episodes: 12
- icon

Maebashi Witches (前橋ウィッチーズ, Maebashi Witchīzu) is an original Japanese anime television series produced by Sunrise. It is directed by Junichi Yamamoto and written by Erika Yoshida, featuring original character designs by Yu Inami, animation character designs by Nozomi Tachibana, and music by Yuri Habuka. The series aired from April 6 to June 22, 2025, on Tokyo MX and other networks.

== Plot ==
The series follows Yuina Akagi, a cheerful girl from Maebashi, Gunma Prefecture who likes to take pictures. One day, a mysterious frog-like creature named Keroppe appears before her, inviting her to be a witch. Yuina initially hesitated, but slowly accepts when she is told that becoming a witch means she could be granted a wish. She meets four other girls – Azu Niisato, Kyōka Kitahara, Choco Mitsumata, and Mai Kamiizumi – who were also recruited by Keroppe. Together, the five girls manage a mysterious flower shop where they help out people with their problems. However, as their activities continue, the girls realize that everything is not what it seems with being a witch.

== Characters ==
Yuina Akagi (赤城 ユイナ, Akagi Yuina)
Voiced by: Sakura Kasuga
Yuina is a first year high school student who is interested in photography, a hobby inspired by her late grandfather. She always brings around an instant camera and likes taking pictures.
Azu Niisato (新里 アズ, Niisato Azu)
Voiced by: Hinano Sakikawa
Azu is a girl interested in fashion and cosmetics. She does not have a good impression of Yuina when they first met. Azu is later revealed to be conscious about her weight and uses magic to have a thin body.
Kyōka Kitahara (北原 キョウカ, Kitahara Kyōka)
Voiced by: Rena Motomura
Kyōka is a girl from a wealthy family who is a fan of the VTuber Mogutan. She stops liking Mogutan after finding out his true nature. After finding out about Choco's family circumstances, Kyōka aims to run for mayor of Maebashi to make it a better place.
Choco Mitsumata (三俣 チョコ, Mitsumata Choko)
Voiced by: Haruka Minami
Choco is a cheerful girl who gets along with Yuina well. Much to the chagrin of others, she is fond of giving them strange nicknames. Her father died when she was young, leaving her with her mother and younger siblings. Her real name is Chiyoko Mitsumata (三俣 知代子, Mitsumata Chiyoko).
Mai Kamiizumi (上泉 マイ, Kamiizumi Mai)
Voiced by: Honami Momose
Mai is a realist girl who has a large social media following, having over 120,000 followers.
Keroppe (ケロッペ)
Voiced by: Tomokazu Sugita
Keroppe is a frog-like creature who recruits the five girls with the aim of turning them into witches.
Eiko Zen (膳栄子, Zen Eiko)
Voiced by: Yū Serizawa
Rinko Mitsuba (三葉凛子, Mistuba Rinko)
Voiced by: Nao Tōyama
Yua Hosaka (保坂優愛, Hosaka Yua)
Voiced by: Akari Kitō

== Media ==
=== Episodes ===
No.	Title	Directed by	Storyboarded by	Original release date
1	"What's Wrong with the Status Quo?!"; Transliteration: "Genjōiji de Nani ga Warui!!" (Japanese: 現状維持で何が悪いっ！！)	Kohei Kuratomi	Junichi Yamamoto	April 6, 2025
2	"You're As Cheap and Flimsy As Your Clothes"; Transliteration: "Fuku mo Anta mo Perappera" (Japanese: 服もアンタもペラッペラ)	Takahiro Hirata	Junichi Yamamoto	April 13, 2025
3	"The Word "Lazy", Pronounced as "Being Yourself""; Transliteration: "Taiman to Kaite, Arinomama to Yomu" (Japanese: 怠慢と書いて、ありのままと読む)	Ayaka Tsujihashi	Mitsuko Kase	April 20, 2025
4	"Go for a 70 Over a 100"; Transliteration: "100-Ten Yori mo 70-Ten" (Japanese: 100点よりも70点)	Harume Kosaka	Romanov Higa	April 27, 2025
5	"Is That 70% of 100%?"; Transliteration: "Sore 100-Pāsento no 70-Pāsento?" (Japanese: それ100%の70%?)	Kohei Kuratomi	Kohei Kuratomi	May 4, 2025
6	"Choco's Big Round Chocolate Cake"; Transliteration: "Choko no Manmaru Chokokēki" (Japanese: チョコのまんまるチョコケーキ)	Wakiko Kume	Takeshi Furuta	May 11, 2025
7	"When Things Suck, It Sucks to Admit That They Suck"; Transliteration: "Shindoi Toki Shindo Itte Iu no Shindoi" (Japanese: しんどい時しんどいって言うのしんどい)	Takahiro Hirata	Romanov Higa	May 18, 2025
8	"Kyoka-chan, You Sure Are Dumb"; Transliteration: "Kyōka-chan tte Baka Nanda ne" (Japanese: キョウカちゃんって馬鹿なんだね)	Harume Kosaka	Mitsuko Kase	May 25, 2025
9	"The Maebashi Witches Are Far Evermore"; Transliteration: "Maebashi Uitchīzu wa Eien Fumetsu" (Japanese: 前橋ウィッチーズは永遠不滅)	Ayaka Tsujihashi	Romanov Higa	June 1, 2025
10	"I'll Never Forget Today, Even If I Forget"; Transliteration: "Kyō no Koto, Wasurete mo Wasurenai yo" (Japanese: 今日のこと、忘れても忘れないよ)	Wakiko Kume	Tetsuo Hirakawa	June 8, 2025
11	"Have We Met Before?"; Transliteration: "...Dochira Samadesuka?" (Japanese: ...どちら様ですか？)	Mitsuko Kase	Romanov Higa	June 15, 2025
12	"I Think I'm Done Being a Witch"; Transliteration: "Majo wa Mō ī Kanatte" (Japanese: 魔女はもういいかなって)	Junichi Yamamoto	Junichi Yamamoto	June 22, 2025

=== Theme songs ===
The opening theme song is "Sugosugi Maebashi Witches!" (スゴすぎ前橋ウィッチーズ！, Sugosugi Maebashi Witchīzu; Super Amazing Maebashi Witches!), while the ending theme song is "Sorezore no Door" (それぞれのドア, Sorezore no Doa; Each Door), both performed by the five main characters collectively known as the Maebashi Witches. Crunchyroll streamed the series.

=== Compilation film ===
A compilation film titled Maebashi Witches Emoemories: Blooming Witches was released on October 23, 2026.

== Reception ==
The anime adaptation was well-received. Cy Catwell of Anime Feminist reviewed the first episode, noted they had always been a fan of magical girls and were drawn to the series because it centers on "magical girl singers", adding that the series has a "path to witchdom... lined with trials", and said it charmed her "pretty instantly", along with its "tasty feminist tidbits", with magic shown as a "vehicle to personal freedom" rather than something which harms young women, but said that the manifestation of their magic in them singing the weakest part of the episode. She also compared the series to Puella Magi Madoka Magica and Wonder Egg Priority and called it a coming-of-age story which is grounded within reality, with teen girls given an opportunity to "be themselves."
