= Promise Mascot Agency =

2025 video game

- Developer: Kaizen Game Works
- Publisher: Kaizen Game Works
- Director: Oli Clarke Smith
- Designers: Oli Clarke Smith; Phil Crabtree
- Programmer: Phil Crabtree
- Artist: Rachel Noy
- Writers: Oli Clarke Smith; Rachel Noy
- Composers: Peter McCaughan; Ryo Koike
- Engine: Unreal Engine
- Platforms: Windows; PlayStation 5; Xbox Series X/S; Nintendo Switch
- Release: April 10, 2025
- Genres: Adventure, management
- Mode: Single-player

Promise Mascot Agency is an open-world adventure and management game developed and published by Kaizen Game Works. In the game, the player manages a mascot agency, recruits mascots, and sends them on jobs while solving the mystery of their exile to rural Japan.

== Gameplay ==
The player takes on the role of Michi "The Janitor", a yakuza fixer who owes a big debt after a job goes wrong. Michi agrees to move to Kyushu in rural Japan, where he must revive a mascot agency and restore the community, all before an anti-yakuza curse kills him.

In doing so, the player is tasked with completing jobs around the open world and recruiting mascots.

== Development ==
United Kingdom-based studio Kaizen previously developed Paradise Killer. Japanese artist and video game director Ikumi Nakamura produced an art bible and designed mascots for the title. In an interview, game director Oli Clarke Smith stated the game's concept came from "Rachel (our Art Director) wanted to make a management game about mascots. Her original idea was a 2D Kairosoft-like, but Phil (our Tech Director) and I wanted to create something bigger." The game then evolved into an open-world RPG management game. Takaya Kuroda, the voice of Kazuma Kiryu in the Yakuza / Like a Dragon series voices Michi.

Kaizen released the "Prepare to Grind" update for the game in August 2025. The update included time trials, new difficulty modes, and a grinding ability upgrade for the player's truck. The developer stated that no further updates were currently planned for the title.

== Release and Reception ==
Reception

Aggregate scores
Aggregator	Score
Metacritic	(PC) 77/100 (PS5) 85/100 (XSXS) 75/100
OpenCritic	83% recommend (Note: Based on 47 reviews)

Review scores
Publication	Score
PC Gamer (US)	94/100
Slant Magazine	6/10

Upon release, the game received generally favorable reviews, according to review aggregator website Metacritic. OpenCritic determined that 83% of critics recommended the game.

Maddi Chilton, writing for PC Gamer, awarded the title 94/100, praising the game's absurdity and the construction of its gameplay systems. In a more mixed review, Slant Magazine awarded the game 6/10, criticizing driving mechanics and its sense of aimlessness.

The game was nominated for Best Indie Game - Self Published at the Golden Joystick Awards 2025.
