= Chiruran: Shinsengumi Requiem =

Japanese manga series

- First tankōbon volume cover

ちるらん 新撰組鎮魂歌 (Chiruran: Shinsengumi Chinkon-ka)
- Genre: Action; Drama; Historical
- Manga
- Written by: Shinya Umemura
- Illustrated by: Eiji Hashimoto
- Published by: Coamix
- English publisher: Mangamo (digital): NA: Titan Comics; SEA: M&C!
- Magazine: Monthly Comic Zenon
- Original run: October 25, 2010 – April 25, 2023
- Volumes: 36
- Manga

Chiruran Nibun no Ichi
- Written by: Shinya Umemura
- Illustrated by: Eiji Hashimoto
- Published by: Coamix
- Magazine: Monthly Comic Zenon
- Original run: May 25, 2016 – present
- Anime television series
- Directed by: Fumie Moroi
- Studio: LandQ Studios
- Licensed by: Crunchyroll
- Original network: Tokyo MX, KBS Kyoto, Sun TV
- Original run: January 9, 2017 – March 28, 2017
- Episodes: 12
- Television drama
- Directed by: Kazutaka Watanabe
- Produced by: Akira Morii
- Written by: Masaaki Sakai
- Music by: Yoshiaki Dewa
- Studio: The Seven
- Licensed by: U-Next; HBO Max (worldwide)
- Original network: TBS
- Original run: March 26, 2026 – June 27, 2026
- Episodes: 8

Chiruran: Shinsengumi Requiem (Japanese: ちるらん 新撰組鎮魂歌, Hepburn: Chiruran: Shinsengumi Chinkon-ka), also known as The Shinsengumi, is a Japanese manga series written by Shinya Umemura and illustrated by Eiji Hashimoto. It was serialized in Coamix's Monthly Comic Zenon from October 2010 to April 2023, with its chapters collected in 36 tankōbon volumes.

== Plot ==
Explores the life of Hijikata Toshizo as he goes from a violent street brawler to joining the Shinsengumi.

== Media ==
=== Manga ===
Written by Shinya Umemura and illustrated by Eiji Hashimoto, Chiruran: Shinsengumi Requiem started in Coamix's Monthly Comic Zenon on October 25, 2010. the manga finished serialization in the magazine on April 25, 2023. Coamix collected its chapters in thirty-six tankōbon volumes, released from April 20, 2011, to July 20, 2023.

The manga is licensed digitally in English by Mangamo under the title The Shinsengumi, in Southeast Asia licensed by M&C!; in France by Mangetsu, and in North America by Titan Comics.

A comedy spin-off manga, titled Chiruran Nibun no Ichi (Chiruran ½), began serialization in the same Comic Zenon magazine on May 25, 2016.

=== Volumes ===
No.	Release date	ISBN
1	April 20, 2011	978-4-19980-012-2
2	October 20, 2011	978-4-19980-042-9
3	February 20, 2012	978-4-19980-063-4
4	July 20, 2012	978-4-19980-096-2
5	December 20, 2012	978-4-19980-125-9
6	April 20, 2013	978-4-19980-142-6
7	August 20, 2013	978-4-19980-161-7
8	January 20, 2014	978-4-19980-188-4
9	May 20, 2014	978-4-19980-208-9
10	September 20, 2014	978-4-19980-234-8
11	January 20, 2015	978-4-19980-251-5
12	May 20, 2015	978-4-19980-267-6
13	September 19, 2015	978-4-19980-293-5
14	January 20, 2016	978-4-19980-324-6
15	May 20, 2016	978-4-19980-345-1
16	September 20, 2016	978-4-19980-368-0
17	December 20, 2016	978-4-19980-382-6
18	May 20, 2017	978-4-19980-411-3
19	September 20, 2017	978-4-19980-444-1
20	September 20, 2014	978-4-19980-470-0
21	May 19, 2018	978-4-19980-496-0
22	September 20, 2018	978-4-19980-522-6
23	January 19, 2019	978-4-19980-548-6
24	May 20, 2019	978-4-19980-569-1
25	September 20, 2019	978-4-19980-592-9
26	January 20, 2020	978-4-19980-615-5
27	May 20, 2020	978-4-86720-149-7
28	September 19, 2020	978-4-86720-167-1
29	January 20, 2021	978-4-86720-194-7
30	May 20, 2021	978-4-86720-238-8
31	September 18, 2021	978-4-86720-269-2
32	January 20, 2022	978-4-86720-293-7
33	May 20, 2022	978-4-86720-377-4
34	September 20, 2022	978-4-86720-414-6
35	March 20, 2023	978-4-86720-460-3
36	July 20, 2023	978-4-86720-528-0

=== Anime ===
An anime television series adaptation based on the Chiruran Nibun no Ichi comedy spinoff manga was announced in September 2016. The series is produced by LandQ Studios and directed by Fumie Moroi; and aired from January 9, 2017, to March 28, 2017, on Tokyo MX, it ran for 12 episodes. Crunchyroll added the series for streaming as it aired in Japan.

=== Stage play ===
A stage play adaptation of the manga was announced by Coamix in February 2017. It ran April 7–10, 2017, at Osaka's Morinomiya Piloti Hall and April 20–30 at Tokyo's Galaxy Theater. The play was directed by Shunichi Okamura.

A stage play adaptation produced by the all-female O'Clock Kumamoto Revue, and written by Umemura, is set to premiere in Q3 2027.

=== Drama CD ===
On September 27, 2017, a drama CD was released by Frontier Works.

=== Drama ===
A live-action television drama adaptation was announced on October 3, 2025. Directed by Kazutaka Watanabe and written by Masaaki Sakai with music composed by Yoshiaki Dewa, it premiered March 26 and 27, 2026 on TBS as a two-episode special, and later on the U-Next service as a series. The series will be streamed worldwide on HBO Max on May 9 of the same year. Its official name, as announced on the official X, is Song of the Samurai.

== Reception ==
By March 2023, the manga had over 3 million copies in circulation.

== See also ==
- Record of Ragnarok, another manga series written by Shinya Umemura
