= Ozuma =

Japanese anime television series

- Leiji Matsumoto's Ozma
- Cover of the DVD Box by Pony Canyon.

松本零士「オズマ」 (Matsumoto Reiji "Ozuma")
- Genre: Post-apocalyptic fiction; Science fiction
- Created by: Based on Chōheiki Ozuma; 1980 pilot script by Leiji Matsumoto
- Anime television series
- Directed by: Takahiro Ikezoe; Ryosuke Takahashi
- Written by: Junki Takegami
- Music by: Kousuke Yamashita
- Studio: LandQ Studios; Gonzo
- Original network: WOWOW
- Original run: 16 March 2012 – 21 April 2012
- Episodes: 6

Leiji Matsumoto's Ozma (松本零士「オズマ」, Matsumoto Reiji "Ozuma"; stylized as OZMA) is a 2012 Japanese anime television series. It was based on a 1980 unused script by Leiji Matsumoto. It was the final anime that Matsumoto had involvement with before his death in February 2023.

== Plot ==
The story is set on Earth in the future when abnormal activity on the sun devastates Earth's atmosphere and covers the entire planet in a sea of sand. Sam pursues Ozma, an enemy of his brother. One day, Sam encounters Maya, who is being chased by the Theseus army.

== Characters ==
=== Main characters ===
Sam Coyne (サム・コイン, Samu Koin)
Voiced by: Tetsuya Kakihara
Sam is the protagonist of Ozma. After his brother was taken, he joined the Baldanos' Crew. He often brings about trouble, for which the crew makes fun of him. Sam saved Maya, who was pursued by the Theseus Army. He is confident and often does not think twice about taking risks. Sam is willing to do anything to assist someone who need anything.
Maya (マヤ)
Voiced by: Rie Tanaka
Maya is a mysterious girl being chased by the Theseus Army. She is saved by Sam Coyne and brought aboard the Bardanos. She is one of the original "Ideal Children". The Ideal Children serve as the basis of the Theseus' cloning operation. Over time, the quality of the clones produced by the Theseus has dropped, and the Theseus want to use Maya to counteract this degradation in quality.
Mimay (ミメイ, Mimei)
Voiced by: Ayumi Fujimura
Mimay is Sam Coin's childhood friend and a crew member of the Bardanos. She holds feelings for him, which he is oblivious of.
Bainas (バイナス, Bainasu)
Voiced by: Atsuko Tanaka
Bainas is the captain of the Bardanos.
Gido Gaira (ギド・ガイラー, Gido Gairā)
Voiced by: Shō Hayami
Gido is a commander for Theseus and a direct subordinate of Danga. At the request of Danga, he pursues Maya after she escapes from the IC. Gido typically wears a mask to hide his true face until he is revealed to be Dick Coin, Sam's older brother.
Dick Coyne (デック・コイン, Dikku Koin)
Voiced by: Shō Hayami
Dick is Sam's older brother who went missing while pursuing Ozma. Upon his disappearance, his body was taken over by Gido. However, he temporarily regained control of his consciousness from him and used the Monoceros.

== Episode list ==
No.	Title	Original release date
1	"The Sand Whale" "Suna no Kujira" (砂のクジラ)	March 16, 2012
While Sam is searching for an Ozma, he spots a woman being chased by the Theseus Army. When an Ozma appears and causes the military to turn back, Sam rescues the woman, who introduces herself as Maya. Sam takes Maya back to the ship he lives on to let her eat, but the Theseus Army catches up and corners the ship, demanding Maya. The captain decides to protect Maya, and the military opens fire. The ship escapes by diving into the desert sand, much to the surprise of the Theseus commander.
2	"Diving Limit" "Senkō Genkai" (潜航限界)	March 23, 2012
The Sand Pirates have escaped with Maya, and Theseus is in hot pursuit. The pirates dive under the sand, but are locked down by sand anchors. The pressure and temperature in the ship are rising, and time is running out.
3	"A Thousand Years of Doubt" "Chitose no Mayoi" (千年の迷い)	March 30, 2012
Maya, fearing that she will bring the unwanted attention of the Theseus upon the Natura, flees from the Bardanos. Maya is being pursued by the Theseus because she is one of the "Ideal Children", or individuals with the "greatest DNA". The Ideal Children are critically important to the Theseus cloning program which is used to produce Theseus soldiers. The Theseus have used the same genetic base for generations, which has led to a degradation in the quality of the clones produced. Ultimately, Maya is captured by Gido and is placed under armed guard on his ship.
4	"To the End of the Earth" "Chi no Hate made" (地の果てまで)	April 7, 2012
As Gido escapes with Maya, Sam sets off in pursuit with Mimay in tow, but their bike is not a match for the Theseus sand cruiser and Gido escapes. They must return to underground with the Bardanos to catch back.
5	"The Masked Man" "Kamen no Otoko" (仮面の男)	April 14, 2012
The Bardanos finds itself in Ozma's nest, a strange cave filled with fresh water and life. Bainas shoots Gido's mask, who is revealed to be Sam's brother.
6	"The Day of a New Life" "Shinsei no Hi" (新生の日)	April 21, 2012
As Ozma's nature is revealed, it is time for Maya to make her choice: begin a new era with the life inside the zone or allow humanity to remain in control of a dying planet.
