= Rena Motomura =

Japanese voice actress

- 本村 玲奈
- Born: 10 October
- Education: Kyoto University of the Arts
- Occupation: Voice actress
- Years active: 2021–present
- Employer: Across Entertainment
- Notable work: Maebashi Witches as Kyoka Kitahara; Betrothed to My Sister's Ex as Marie; Playing Death Games to Put Food on the Table as Aoi; Witch Hat Atelier as Coco

Rena Motomura (Japanese: 本村 玲奈, Hepburn: Motomura Rena; born 10 October) is a Japanese voice actress from Osaka Prefecture, affiliated with Across Entertainment. Her starring roles include Kyoka Kitahara in Maebashi Witches, Marie in Betrothed to My Sister's Ex, Aoi in Playing Death Games to Put Food on the Table, and Coco in Witch Hat Atelier.

== Early life and education ==
Rena Motomura, a native of Osaka Prefecture, was born on 10 October. She became interested in acting after reading the acting manga Suki Desu Suzuki-kun!!, and in a voice acting career after seeing Natsuki Hanae's performance as Ken Kaneki in the Tokyo Ghoul anime during high school.

With her parents opposing her voice acting ambitions, she decided to join the drama club, and she was a Screenplay Award winner at the Osaka Prefectural Theatre Research Conference and an Osaka Prefecture representative at the Kinki High School General Cultural Festival. Although her parents were still opposed, they reconsidered after she won the Atereko Kōshien contest, where Hanae happened to be the judge, and was hired by Across. She was educated at the Kyoto University of the Arts Department of Performing Arts.

== Career ==
Motomura made her voice acting debut as Kanemoto in the 2021 film Fortune Favors Lady Nikuko while still a university student. She had previously auditioned for the role of Maria before being beat out by Izumi Ishii. In September 2024, it was announced she would star as Kyoka Kitahara in Maebashi Witches. In 2025, she voiced her first lead role as Marie in the Betrothed to My Sister's Ex anime; she recalled in an Animate Times interview that while auditioning, she found one line "very difficult to say" and had to repeat it 100 times every day. She starred as Aoi in the 2026 anime adaptation of Playing Death Games to Put Food on the Table, and is starring as Coco in Witch Hat Atelier.

On 5 July 2025, she announced that she would take a brief hiatus from singing due to a pharyngitis diagnosis.

Motomura has a younger brother. Her hobbies include drawing and screenwriting. Her special skills include five years of experience in classical ballet, as well as three years of kyokushin experience.

== Filmography ==
=== Television animation ===
Year	Title	Role	Ref
2025	Maebashi Witches	Kyoka Kitahara	
2025	Betrothed to My Sister's Ex	Marie	
2026	Playing Death Games to Put Food on the Table	Aoi	
2026	Witch Hat Atelier	Coco	

=== Animated film ===
Year	Title	Role	Ref
2021	Fortune Favors Lady Nikuko	Kanemoto	

=== Video games ===
Year	Title	Role	Ref
2026	Shinigami Hime to Ishokan no Kaibutsu	Mono	
