= Doctor Hauzer =

1994 video game

- Developer: Riverhillsoft
- Publisher: Panasonic
- Director: Kenichiro Hayashi
- Producer: Kazuhiro Okazaki
- Designers: Toshiaki Kawasaki; Kotaro Mitoma
- Programmers: Akihiro Hino; Masahiro Noda
- Composer: Ken Inaoka (sound effects)
- Platform: 3DO Interactive Multiplayer
- Release: JP: April 29, 1994
- Genres: Adventure, survival horror
- Mode: Single-player

Doctor Hauzer (Note: Japanese: ドクターハウザー, Hepburn: Dokutā Hauzā) is a 1994 survival horror-adventure video game developed by Riverhillsoft and published in Japan by Panasonic for the 3DO Interactive Multiplayer. The player takes on the role of Adams Adler, a newspaper reporter investigating a mansion for clues to the whereabouts of the eponymous Hauzer, a famed archeologist who has mysteriously disappeared. The game tasks the player with navigating the large mansion by collecting useful items, solving various puzzles, and avoiding deadly traps.

Doctor Hauzer has stark graphical and gameplay similarities with early titles in the Infogrames survival horror series Alone in the Dark, which feature 3D polygonal characters and objects set against fixed, pre-rendered backgrounds. However, Doctor Hauzer is the first of this genre to include fully 3D environments that the player can explore while freely swapping between third-person, first-person, and top-down perspectives. These characteristics were carried over into Riverhillsoft's next game, OverBlood.

In spite of the game's single region-exclusivity, Doctor Hauzer has been reviewed by several publications outside Japan and has been met with an overall average critical reception. It has enjoyed positive commentary for its sound design and achievement of 3D graphics on a home console. The game garnered mostly favorable opinions regarding its gameplay and the player's ability to change camera views, though reviewers widely disapproved of its short length and slow frame rate. Like Alone in the Dark, Doctor Hauzer has been viewed by some sources as a notable step in the early evolution of the survival horror genre. The game has never been officially released outside Japan, although fan translations exist.

== Gameplay ==
Adams Adler investigates a room with the default third-person perspective. The fully-rendered 3D environments allow for first-person and top-down views as well.

Doctor Hauzer is a survival horror-adventure game in which the objective is to explore a large mansion in search of clues leading to the missing, titular character. All the game's environments and their elements are fully rendered in 3D with the default viewpoint being a third-person perspective at fixed camera angles that adjust according to the player's position in a room. Every self-contained room is separated by the others with a door, staircase, or similar pathway that acts as a loading screen between them.

The game utilizes tank controls, whereby pushing up or down on the controller's directional pad moves the player character forward or backward relative to the direction he faces and pushing left or right rotates him. Additional controller inputs let the player run while moving, leap forward, investigate the scenery, push or pull heavy objects like furniture, pick up important items, and access an inventory of collected items. This inventory consists of a notebook for saving the player's progress, a map, keys for unlocking doors, and items for solving various puzzles necessary to advance through the house. Some items can be combined by selecting them one after the other, such as a candelabra and lighter that will illuminate a dark passage.

Other items for working out puzzles include weapons like a knife and a gun. However, the mansion in Doctor Hauzer features no combat or enemies and instead relies upon numerous traps and obstacles that can cause the player an instant game over. These include floor pits in numerous areas, a room filled with swinging blades on pendulums, and a hallway containing a large, rolling boulder. The player can freely switch to first-person and top-down (overhead) camera perspectives at any time. These views have situational advantages over one another. For example, the first-person mode is useful for investigating objects and puzzle clues up close, while the overhead mode is better for surveying room layouts and jumping over floor gaps.

== Plot ==
The backstory of Doctor Hauzer is explained during the game's prologue, expounded through its protagonist. Set in 1952, it follows Adams Adler, a young reporter for the Boston Science Monitor newspaper. Adler has built his decade-long career around covering stories about Dr. Hauzer, an eccentric archeologist for Boston University, world-famous for his scientific discoveries. Hauzer suddenly vanishes from the public eye and Adler tracks his last known location to a secluded, oceanside mansion. Adler quickly learns that the house is riddled with perilous traps, locked doors, and secret passageways. Also strewn throughout the mansion are journal entries detailing recent events. Having the home built over the excavation site, Hauzer and his two assistants unearthed a stone lithograph relating to the cherubim, biblical beings tasked by God with protecting the Garden of Eden. Hauzer's devoted wife, who accompanied him, eventually died from illness while he was preoccupied with his work. Hauzer's obsession with the cryptic tablet steadily grew, leading to his belief that if he was able to decipher its meaning and communicate with the cherubim, they would lead him into paradise where he could partake from the tree of life and gain immortality. Hauzer's increasing insanity caused him to sacrifice his assistants in the name of the cherubim and his final diary entry implies that members of law enforcement and university faculty would also potentially fall victim to his paranoia.

Adler makes his way through the property and has a brief encounter with the ghostly figure of Dr. Hauzer, then eventually comes across and pockets a photograph of Hauzer's wife. He descends deeper into the excavation area, his journey culminating in a minecart ride to the location of the lithograph. There Adler again meets Hauzer's spirit, which then merges with the stone artifact to become a large, humanoid face. Hauzer states that he has achieved the divinity he sought through the cherubim and now only wishes to reunite with his deceased wife. Angered by Adler's presence, the spirit becomes malevolent and begins emitting an endless barrage of fireballs at the journalist in an attempt to kill him. Adler desperately makes his way forward and tosses the photograph of Hauzer's wife at the entity, causing a large explosion. The dig site becomes unstable and Adler narrowly escapes on the minecart as the mansion and its surrounding foundation fall into the abyss below. During the game's epilogue, Adler states he wishes not to publish his findings for fear the public would dismiss them as fiction and admits he himself was in disbelief that the events actually occurred.

== Development ==
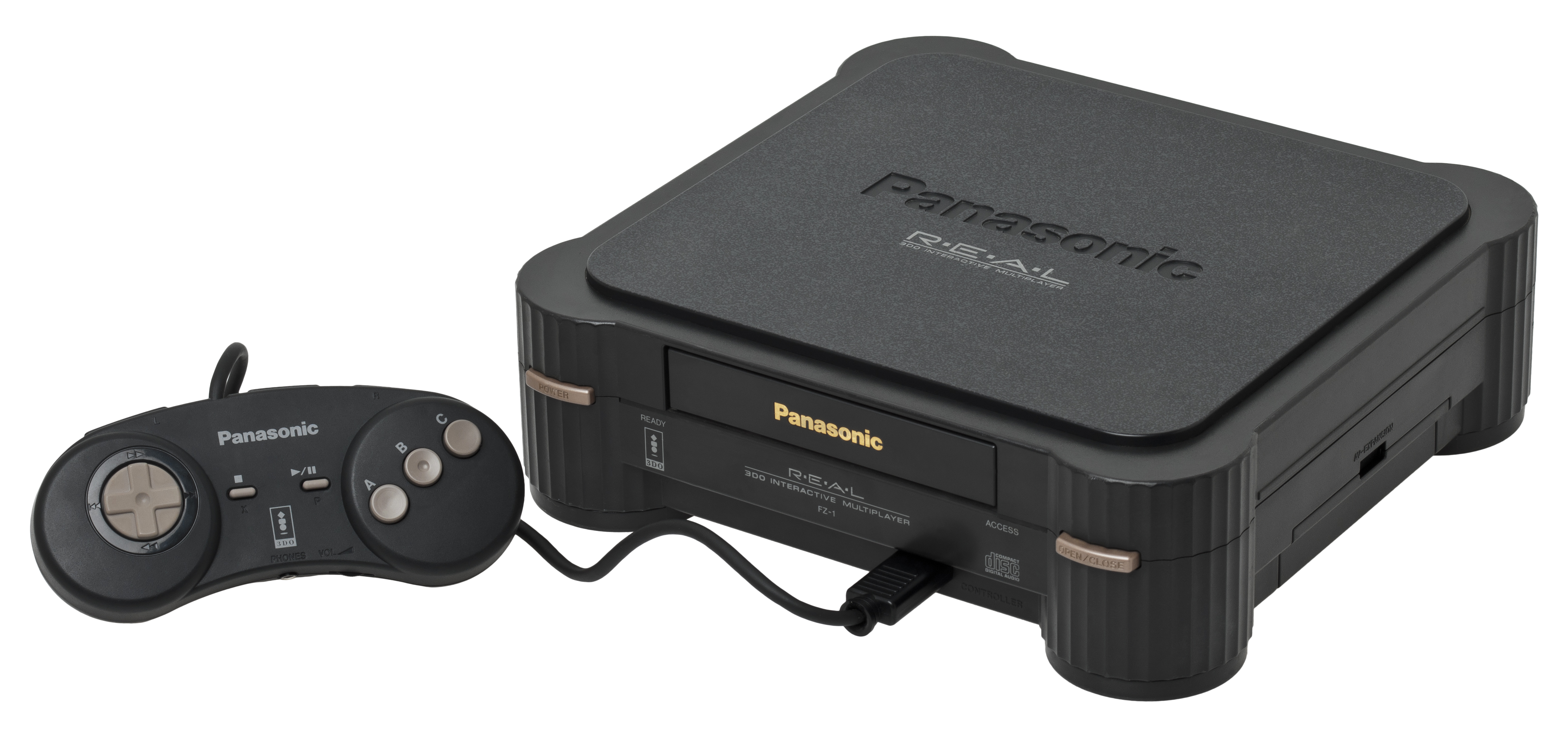
Doctor Hauzer was developed for the 3DO Interactive Multiplayer.

Doctor Hauzer was developed by a small team at Riverhillsoft, a Japanese company better known for its J.B. Harold Murder Club series of murder mystery adventure games. Only a few staff members are known and are merely listed in the game's opening cinematic. Doctor Hauzer was directed by Kenichiro Hayashi and produced by Kazuhiro Okazaki. Toshiaki Kawasaki and Kotaro Mitoma were the game's computer graphics and polygon designers respectively. A music composer for Doctor Hauzer is not credited, though Ken Inaoka is listed as having created its sound effects. The game was programmed by Akihiro Hino and Masahiro Noda. This is one of the earliest works for Hino, who went on to head the developer Level-5.

Reflecting on the start of his career, Hino explained that as he joined Riverhillsoft the video game market was stepping up its advancement from 2D to 3D graphics, particularly in the United States. The young designer, wanting to make a name for himself at the company, intensely researched the budding technology and experimented on higher-end personal computers capable of producing 3D programs at the time. Hino felt that with the release of the 3DO Interactive Multiplayer the era of 3D gaming had officially begun and Doctor Hauzer was subsequently developed for the platform. The game became the first fully 3D survival horror game. It is often recognized for its narrative, graphical, and gameplay similarities to the Infogrames series Alone in the Dark, though the two differ in certain ways. Whereas Alone in the Dark focuses more on horror and earlier titles feature 3D polygonal characters and objects set against pre-rendered backgrounds, Doctor Hauzer centers more on adventure and has texture-mapped, polygonal environments that can be explored with multiple camera perspectives.

== Reception ==
Reception

Review scores
Publication	Score
Consoles +	88%
Computer and Video Games	32%
Edge	7/10
Famitsu	7/10, 8/10, 9/10, 5/10
GameFan	268/300
GamesMaster	66/100
Génération 4	80%
Next Generation	3/5
PC Gamer (US)	68/100

Upon its release in Japan, Doctor Hauzer was evaluated by the staff of Weekly Famitsu alongside many other 3DO titles that immediately followed the console's launch in the region the month prior. Three of the magazine's four contributors included the game as a top recommendation for new 3DO owners. Though Doctor Hauzer was never officially localized outside of Japan, it has earned critical commentary from several English and French language media outlets and accrued an overall average reception. The game has been universally compared to the successful Alone in the Dark series, so much so that members of the press often referred to it as being directly inspired by or a clone of those games. Next Generation viewed Doctor Hauzer as largely derivative of Alone in the Dark, but admitted to not finding it as atmospheric, challenging, or detailed. However, the magazine ultimately recommended the game and that it was still "worth a look." Edge repeated this comment, considering Doctor Hauzer "polished and slick" and stating it was not a bad thing it had "more than a passing resemblance" to the "groundbreaking" Alone in the Dark. Mark Patterson of Computer and Video Games was much more negative, recounting all aspects of Riverhillsoft's effort as blatant plagiarism of Alone in the Dark and proclaiming Doctor Hauzer as "a miserable copy." Alternatively, GameFan editor-in-chief Dave Halverson suggested that its presentation coupled with its user control allowed for an interactive, cinematic experience favoring Out of this World.

The use of fully rendered 3D graphics in Doctor Hauzer has been met with general praise. While Famitsu felt the visual offerings on the 3DO were inferior to competing hardware in 1994, the staff recognized that the polygonal graphics and multiple camera perspectives in Doctor Hauzer helped to distinguish it. Halverson hailed the game's aesthetic as a revolutionary prelude to the real-time graphical capabilities of the fifth-generation video game consoles, witnessed primarily in PC games at the time. Halverson, along with other GameFan staff, applauded the game's 3D models and virtual environments as "brilliant," "awesome", "outstanding," and "a breakthrough effort for a home console." Edge labeled the graphics "fantastic" and was impressed that the game world was constructed entirely using "superbly detailed texture-mapped polygons" that allowed for more camera viewpoints and an improvement over the look of Alone in the Dark. Retro Gamer reflected on Doctor Hauzer as "much more" than an Alone in the Dark clone, citing that it likely demonstrated the 3D graphical prowess of the 3DO better than any other release for the console. Patterson adversely denoted "a few bits of texture mapping" as its only technical advantage over that franchise, and surmised, "Even when there's nothing moving the game isn't that good to look at." The game's audio was also a high point for reviewers. Edge felt the music outdid its visual presentation, declaring, "From the familiar-sounding intro tune to the actual ingame score, Doctor Hauzer is a musical delight." Halverson described the soundtrack as "excellent, setting the spooky mood perfectly." Tom Massey of Eurogamer asserted Doctor Hauzer as "one of the 3DO's more intriguing exclusives" because of its originality and sound design.

Opinions regarding the core adventure gameplay of Doctor Hauzer have been somewhat varied but mostly favorable. Edge found a linear structure to solving puzzles that range from simple to very obscure and allow the player to steadily traverse the game's mansion setting. The magazine later characterized the puzzles as more complex yet less rewarding than those in Alone in the Dark, while Retro Gamer assessed its puzzles as lacking "the subtle genius" of Resident Evil in the wake of the latter's release. The gameplay polarized two of Famitsu's reviewers; while one was thrilled by exploration and discovery within the mansion, the other was largely put off by the instant deaths associated with some of its unforeseen traps. Next Generation, Edge, and Halverson all positively noted the player's ability to swap camera modes in Doctor Hauzer as helpful or even essential in completing the game. Patterson contrarily saw no value in changing to the first-person perspective and only recognized the top-down view as useful for checking a room's contents, also concluding that there were too few obstacles or action to qualify it as either an adventure or an arcade game. The game's short length and slow frame rate have been largely criticized. Edge declared that working out puzzles and advancing in Doctor Hauzer does not last long enough and that having a larger house to explore or more characters with which to interact would make the game "an essential purchase." The publication partially blamed the playing time on the ease of saving one's progress, but admitted that starting the game over upon dying would be an even greater drawback. Halverson considered the short playtime the game's sole weakness, but that this was remedied through its replay value. Patterson condemned Doctor Hauzer for having "incredibly sluggish" movement which "slaughters the gameplay." Edge specified its lack of speed a major fault as well, but justified it as a result of its "graphical splendor" and that it did not detract much from the experience due to its lack of combat, few instances of having to run away, and leisurely pace for solving puzzles. Massey mentioned in 2015 that the game was likely to be deemed slow by more modern game standards.

== Legacy ==
Riverhillsoft's next release following Doctor Hauzer was a horror game for the PlayStation titled OverBlood. Like Doctor Hauzer, this game was completely rendered in 3D and featured the same choice of first-person, third-person, and top-down camera perspectives. A few publications have viewed the flat, shaded polygons in Doctor Hauzer as an early example of cel shading, a computer graphics technique found more prominently in the decade following its release. A 2014 article by Lucas Sullivan of GamesRadar+ called Doctor Hauzer a "prototype for the cel-shading aesthetic" and that it merely lacked the thick, black outlines attributed to this style. A 2016 issue of PC Gamer claimed, "If Jet Set Radio marked the hot, explosive puberty of cel-shaded graphics, then this 3DO game was its slithering birth."

Some sources have treated Doctor Hauzer as a notable step in the evolution of survival horror leading up to the landmark 1996 debut of Resident Evil by Capcom, which popularized and helped better define the genre. Allistair Pinsof of Destructoid mentioned Doctor Hauzer as a "little-known pioneer of survival horror." The Escapist contributor Liz Finnegan wrote that, alongside contemporaries like Alone in the Dark, Clock Tower, and D, Doctor Hauzer helped establish many of the tropes and gameplay elements that paved the way for Resident Evil. Video game historian Carl Therrien of the Université de Montréal wrote that both Doctor Hauzer and Alone in the Dark "influenced the look and pacing of Resident Evil to a great extent." In a 2013 Famitsu magazine interview, Silent Hill and Siren creator Keiichiro Toyama credited Doctor Hauzer for sparking his interest in developing horror games.

Although Doctor Hauzer was not officially released outside Japan, fan translations exist.
