= Mobile Suit Gundam AGE (video game) =

2012 video game

- Cover art for both versions of the game
- Developer: Level-5
- Publisher: Namco Bandai Games
- Writer: Akihiro Hino
- Composer: Kei Yoshikawa
- Platform: PlayStation Portable
- Release: JP: August 30, 2012
- Genres: Action role-playing game, hack and slash, Mecha; Military Science Fiction
- Modes: Single-player, multiplayer

Mobile Suit Gundam AGE (機動戦士ガンダムAGE, Kidō Senshi Gandamu Eiji) is a mecha action role-playing game developed by Level-5 and published by Namco Bandai Games. Considered as an adaptation of the anime of the same name, the game is divided into two versions: Universe Accel and Cosmic Drive, with each version having differences in the additional content. Both games were released on August 30, 2012.

== Gameplay ==
Gameplay of Mobile Suit Gundam AGE follows the same vein as Level-5 previous mecha role-playing game Danball Senki. The story mode largely follows events from the original anime series, however, it is also possible to proceed through the story differently than from the series. A number of original Wears are featured in the game. Apart from the story mode, various "cross-play" missions can be cleared by up to three players.

== Story ==
The story of the game follows the events of the Mobile Suit Gundam AGE anime series, whose storyline is divided into three arcs, each revolving around a different protagonist during the events of the "One Hundred Year War", a long conflict between the "Earth Sphere" (formed by the Earth and its space colonies) and the nation of "Vagan" (composed of several colonies based on Mars) which started on A.G. 101. The first arc's main character is Flit Asuno, who develops the Gundam AGE-1 based on the AGE Device he received from his mother. The AGE Device is part of the "AGE System" which makes use of the combat data gathered during battle to create new weapons for the Gundam, and eventually, new Gundams for the other protagonists to pilot. The second arc's main character is Asemu Asuno who is Flit's son, piloting the Gundam AGE-2 and the third and final arc's main character is Kio Asuno, who is Asemu's son and Flit's grandson piloting the Gundam AGE-3 and its successor unit, the Gundam AGE-FX.

== Version differences ==
Although both versions contain the same game, both Universe Accel and Cosmic Drive have exclusive content that is not accessible from within the other. Universe Accel contains guest mobile suits from the Universal Century series, including Mobile Suit Gundam, Mobile Suit Zeta Gundam, Mobile Suit Gundam ZZ, Mobile Suit Gundam: Char's Counterattack and Mobile Suit Gundam Unicorn. Cosmic Drive includes guest mobile suits from the Cosmic Era and Anno Domini timelines, including Mobile Suit Gundam SEED, Mobile Suit Gundam SEED Destiny and Mobile Suit Gundam 00.

== Development ==
Development of the game began when Akihiro Hino and Level-5 were first hired by Sunrise to develop a Gundam video game. Interested with working for the Gundam franchise, Hino wrote a plot summary for an anime which Bandai eventually saw and decided to create an anime based on it. During the anime's airing, the game was announced and was released on August 30, 2012, in Japan.
