= Snack World =

Japanese multimedia franchise

スナックワールド (Sunakku Wārudo)
- Genre: Fantasy
- Manga
- Written by: Fujiminosuke Yorozuya
- Published by: Shogakukan
- Imprint: Tentōmushi CoroCoro Comic
- Magazine: CoroCoro Comic
- Original run: December 2016 – August 2018
- Volumes: 3
- Manga
- Written by: sho.t
- Published by: Shogakukan
- Imprint: Sunday Webry SSC
- Magazine: Sunday Webry; Shōnen Sunday S
- Original run: July 2017 – April 2018
- Volumes: 2
- Anime television series
- Directed by: Takeshi Mori
- Written by: Akihiro Hino
- Music by: Rei Kondoh
- Studio: OLM
- Original network: TV Tokyo
- English network: AU: Cartoon Network
- Original run: April 13, 2017 – April 19, 2018
- Episodes: 50
- Video game

The Snack World: Trejarers
- Developer: Level-5
- Publisher: Level-5
- Directed by: Akihiro Hino
- Music by: Rei Kondoh
- Genre: Roguelike RPG
- Platform: Nintendo 3DS
- Released: JP: August 10, 2017
- Video game

Snack World: The Dungeon Crawl – Gold
- Developer: Level-5 h.a.n.d.
- Publisher: Level-5
- Directed by: Akihiro Hino
- Music by: Rei Kondoh
- Genre: Roguelike RPG
- Platform: Nintendo Switch
- Released: JP: April 12, 2018; WW: February 14, 2020

Snack World (Japanese: スナックワールド, Hepburn: Sunakku Wārudo) is a Japanese multimedia franchise created and developed by Level-5. It consists of video games, manga adaptations, a CGI anime series, and a toy line by Takara Tomy.

== Overview ==
Snack World is a multimedia franchise created by Level-5, following Fantasy Life, Inazuma Eleven, Little Battlers eXperience, Professor Layton, and Yo-kai Watch. The franchise is a "hyper casual fantasy" that is set in Snack World, a traditional fantasy world combined with convenience stores, smartphones, and other elements of the modern world. It revolves around the adventures of Chup, a wandering hero with a strong sense of justice, who is determined to get revenge against Large-Scale Leisure Facilities after it destroyed his village in response to the villagers refusing to allow eviction of the village by the former. Madly in love with King Papaya's (Note: Known as "Ōsama" (王様, lit. "King") in the Japanese version) daughter, Princess Melonia, (Note: Known as "Merōra-hime" (メローラ姫, lit. "Princess Melora") in the Japanese version) he fulfills her selfish wishes by going on quests, accompanied by an inelegant witch, Mayonna; (Note: Known as "Mayone" (マヨネ) in the Japanese version) a muscular warrior, Béarnaise; (Note: Known as "Peperon" (ペペロン) in the Japanese version) a goblin-like creature, Gobson. And a female pig-nosed dragon, Pigsy. (Note: Known as "Butako" (ブタ子) in the Japanese version)

== Media ==
=== Video games ===
Snack World: Trejarers (スナックワールド トレジャラーズ Sunakku Wārudo Torejarāzu) was released on the Nintendo 3DS on August 10, 2017, in Japan. An expanded port for the Nintendo Switch was launched in the country on April 12, 2018 Versions for iOS and Android devices were announced alongside the franchise's reveal, but have yet to be released. In South Korea, a MMORPG called Snack World Versus (스낵월드 버서스 Seunaeg Woldeu Beoseoseu) was released for smartphones on November 23, 2018.

On November 20, 2019, it was announced that the enhanced version of Trejarers would be released outside of Japan as Snack World: The Dungeon Crawl – Gold on February 14, 2020.

=== Manga ===
Written and illustrated by Fujiminosuke Yorozuya, a manga adaptation of Snack World was serialized in Shogakukan's CoroCoro Comic manga magazine between December 2016 and August 2018. Another manga adaptation, written and illustrated by sho.t, debuted on Shōnen Sunday's Webry website under the title TV Animation: The Snack World (TV Animation スナックワールド) on April 28, 2017. It eventually began serialization in the July issue of Shogakukan's Shōnen Sunday Super manga magazine, where it ran until the magazine's April 2018 issue.

=== Anime ===
Level-5 unveiled a CGI pilot film of the anime series during their "Level-5 Vision 2015 -The Beginning-" presentation on April 7, 2015, which showcased the overall premise and the main characters. The company later streamed an English dub of the pilot film on YouTube the following day.

The regular series later premiered on TV Tokyo and its affiliates between April 13, 2017, and April 19, 2018, in Japan. Level-5 president and CEO Akihiro Hino served as chief director and also handled the series composition, Takeshi Mori served as director, while Rei Kondoh composed the music. Dentsu, OLM, and TV Tokyo served as producers, while OLM Digital provided the animation production.

The first three English dubbed episodes were screened at Anime Expo 2019. The series debuted on Cartoon Network channels in Australia and Southeast Asia in the fall of 2019. Crunchyroll began streaming the English dub in select Western countries on February 14, 2020.

=== Merchandise ===
The toy line by Takara Tomy consists of a series of "Jara" (ジャラ) and "Snacks" (スナック) that are embedded with NFC chips, which are sold in "TreJara Boxes" (トレジャラボックス). Jara are key chain weapon replicas, while Snacks are monster summon tokens. Both can interact with Snack World: Trejarers by placing them at the lower screen of the 3DS system, which grants players the same item or monsters in-game. Both can also be used in the Fairypon, a handheld device that allows users to hear special effects and play small games.

Asmodee signed on to handle the European distribution of the toy line, along with other merchandise, which was set to launch in Fall 2018, but has not come up since its original announcement.

== Reception ==
During its first week, Snack World: Trejarers ranked #2 and sold 97,534 units. In 2017, Level-5 abby stated that the toy line had "already trad[ed] at 500% above forecast", with the anime being one of the highest-rated kids series on TV Tokyo.
