= Yo-kai Sangokushi =

2016 role-playing video game

- Official artwork for the game depicting some of its characters
- Developer: Koei Tecmo
- Publisher: Level-5
- Producers: Yoichi Erikawa; Hisashi Koinuma
- Series: Yo-kai Watch, Romance of the Three Kingdoms
- Platform: Nintendo 3DS
- Release: JP: April 2, 2016
- Genre: Tactical role-playing
- Modes: Single-player, multiplayer

Yo-kai Sangokushi (Note: Japanese: 妖怪三国志 Hepburn: Yōkai Sangokushi) is a turn-based tactical role-playing game developed by Koei Tecmo and published by Level-5 for the Nintendo 3DS in 2016 exclusively in Japan. The game is a collaboration between Koei Tecmo's video game series Romance of the Three Kingdoms and Level-5's multi-media franchise Yo-kai Watch and sees the player controlling military commanders who aim to unify the world. In the game's plot, several characters from Yo-kai Watch are transported into a book titled Yo-kai Sangokushi, where they become military leaders and must find eight jewels to return to their world. A sequel, Yo-kai Sangokushi: Kunitori Wars, was released for mobile devices in 2018.

== Plot ==
While exploring the library of the Springdale Elementary School, Jibanyan, Komasan, and Usapyon find a book titled Yo-kai Sangokushi, which they are teleported into. During the beginning of the game, the player chooses either Jibanyan, Komasan, or Usapyon, and the plot of the game centers around the Yo-kai the player picked. Inside the book, the three Yo-kai are separated and turned into military leaders. They later find out that they need to find eight jewels to return to the real world, which becomes the focus of the game.

== Gameplay ==

The battles in Yo-kai Sangokushi takes place on two screens. On the top screen, the battle is held, and on the bottom screen, the player controls what attacks or actions the playable characters will perform.

Yo-kai Sangokushi sees the player battling enemies in multiple different areas in a turn-based format. The player navigates areas in-battle by moving the characters through squared tiles, however, characters have a limited amount of tiles they can travel during their turn. The player controls a team of up to six Yo-kai during one battle, with the Yo-kai being dependent on the player's team.

During battles, Yo-kai have 6 different actions they can perform: attack (which only be performed when close to an enemy), inspirit (which will affect another Yo-kai, which can be positive or negative depending on if the inspirited is a teammate or not), end turn (which will end the Yo-kai's turn), item (which will allow the player to use an item on the playing Yo-kai), and an elemental attack option (which will make the playing Yo-kai use an elemental attack on enemies). Each Yo-kai also has a unique "Soultimate", a more powerful move that, depending on the user, can either be offensive or give positive effects to teammates. Unlike other moves, the Soultimate can only be performed once a Yo-kai's "soul gage" is full, which is increased when a Yo-kai attacks an enemy. All performable actions can vary on the Yo-kai, with each Yo-kai having a unique set of attacks. When two enemies of the same team have a Yo-kai of the other team in between them, a more powerful attack can be performed on the middle Yo-kai. When a Yo-kai attacks an enemy, a "warlord attachment battle" minigame may occur in which the player must press the A button at the same time they collide with their enemy. Enemies, who are controlled by the AI, have the same general actions as playable characters.

Alike traditional Yo-kai Watch games, the player has a chance to "befriend" (recruit) battled Yo-kai after battles. Yo-kai are divided into different tribes. The Crank-a-kai, a gacha-like mechanic where the player inserts coins to receive Yo-kai or items, returns from previous Yo-kai Watch entries.

Yo-kai Sangokushi is divided into chapters, with each chapter typically ending with a boss battle.

== Development and release ==
Yo-kai Sangokushi was supposedly developed by a team of fans of the Yo-kai Watch series. Prior to when the development of Yo-kai Sangokushi began, Akihiro Hino, the CEO of Level-5, and Yoichi Erikawa, the founder of Koei Tecmo, had a "close relationship as game creators" and had talked about working together at some point. At an unknown time, Erikawa had sent a letter to Hino praising the Yo-kai Watch series and its ability to expand into multimedia. Hino, who had learned Japanese history through Romance of the Three Kingdoms and Nobunaga's Ambition, respected Erikasawa, and called him his history teacher. Due to the two's respect for each other, the collaboration was "realized." During development, over 400 Yo-kai had to be turned into military commanders, something Hino described as "a really difficult problem."

Yo-kai Sangokushi was first announced by Level-5 on April 7, 2015, through a presentation held at the Tokyo Dome City Hall. The announcement was in commemoration of the 30th anniversary of the Romance of the Three Kingdoms series. A playable demo of the game was available during the World Hobby Fair Winter 2016. On January 14, 2016, CoroCoro Comics, the serializers of the Yo-kai Watch manga, published an announcement for the game on YouTube. A debut trailer for the game was published by Level-5 on February 14, 2016.

For a limited time in 2016, Lawson HMV Entertainment released an official pencil board featuring the main characters from Yo-kai Sangokushi. A 12-page volume focused on Yo-kai Sangokushi was included in the April 14, 2016, issue of Famitsu (which released on March 31, 2016) to commemorate the game's release. The volume included an interview with Hino and Erikawa. A limited-time event was held in Yo-kai Watch: Wibble Wobble in Japan to promote Yo-kai Sangokushi's release. The event saw players picking one out of three teams and attempting to collect jewels for their chosen team, with the team with the most jewels winning. The event was held from April 16, 2016, to April 28, 2016.

On March 16, 2016, pre-orders for the game were made available. Yo-kai Sangokushi released in Japan on April 2, 2016. The retail version of the game included a physical Yo-kai Medal of Komasan Sun Ce. A figure strap of Komasan Sun Ce was also included in first-print copies of the game. If the player had downloaded the game digitally, they would receive the character Buchinyan Cho Un.

=== Soundtrack ===
The game's ending theme, "Bling Bling Great Whirlwind" (ブリンブリン大旋風), was composed by Maiko, Gerapper, and ZZROCK of King Cream Soda. The song is an uptempo version of the main theme from Romance of the Three Kingdoms mixed with rap. The "bling"s in the title is hip-hop slang for glaring, which Gerapper, the namer of the song, stated was used due to "the glare of the warlord's way" in the Romance of the Three Kingdoms series.

== Reception and sales ==
Reception

Review score
| Publication | Score |
|---|---|
| Famitsu | 35/40 |

Famitsu gave Yo-kai Sangokushi a score of 35 out of 40. In February 2016, Chris Carter, writing for Destructoid, called the collaboration "rad" and described its plot as "wacky." Later in March the same year, Carter, again writing for Destructoid, called the game "adorable" and said that it "looks amazing." Akiru Miyashita of 4Gamer.net called Yo-kai Sangokushi "interesting". Shinichi Yamoto, also writing for 4Gamer.net, described the game's ending theme as "combin[ing] the energy of Yo-kai Watch with the history of the [Romance of the Three Kingdoms series.]"

In May 2016, Yo-kai Sangokushi was the fifth best-selling video game, having sold over 498,000 copies. Yo-kai Sangokushi, as well as other games, helped increase play activity from younger Nintendo 3DS players.

== Sequel ==
Another game set in the same universe as Yo-kai Sangokushi, titled Yo-kai Sangokushi: Kunitori Wars, was released for mobile devices in January 2018. The game takes place in China, and features 3 different groups of players who all fight each other in a free-for-all. The sequel has the same general gameplay as Yo-kai Sangokushi, but was free-to-play and included microtransactions.
