= Yo-kai Watch 2 =

2014 role-playing video games

Yo-kai Watch 2: Bony Spirits; Yo-kai Watch 2: Fleshy Souls; Yo-kai Watch 2: Psychic Specters
- North American packaging artwork for Bony Spirits. The top right says an exclusive medal is included, which is used for the Yo-kai Watch Model Zero toy.
- Developer: Level-5
- Publishers: JP: Level-5; WW: Nintendo
- Director: Ken Motomura
- Producer: Akihiro Hino
- Designer: Tatsuya Shinkai
- Programmers: Yuji Mori; Tetsuo Mori
- Artists: Takuzo Nagano; Miho Tanaka; Nobuyuki Yanai
- Writers: Kohei Azuma; Akihiro Hino; Yoichi Kato
- Composer: Kenichiro Saigo
- Series: Yo-kai Watch
- Platform: Nintendo 3DS
- Release: July 10, 2014: Bony Spirits & Fleshy Souls; JP: July 10, 2014; NA: September 30, 2016; AU: October 15, 2016; EU: April 7, 2017 Psychic Specters; JP: December 13, 2014; NA/EU: September 29, 2017; AU: November 2017
- Genres: Role-playing, Auto battler
- Modes: Single-player, multiplayer

Yo-kai Watch 2: Bony Spirits (Note: Japanese: 妖怪ウォッチ2元祖, Hepburn: Yōkai Wotchi Tsū Ganso) and Yo-kai Watch 2: Fleshy Souls (Note: Japanese: 妖怪ウォッチ2本家, Hepburn: Yōkai Wotchi Tsū Honke) are a pair of 2014 role-playing video games developed and published by Level-5 for the Nintendo 3DS. The games are a sequel to 2013's Yo-kai Watch, and were released in July 2014 in Japan, in North America and Australia in late 2016, and Europe in 2017. Much like their predecessor, the games put players in an open world, befriending and battling various Yo-kai, which are ghosts and apparitions originating in Japanese folklore, that cause mischief in daily life. In the beginning of the story, the memories of the protagonists Nathan "Nate" Adams and Katie Forester are erased when their Yo-kai Watches is stolen by two evil Yo-kai, leaving them with no recollection of their past adventures. However, they soon stumble across their Yo-kai butler Whisper and Yo-kai cat Jibanyan once again, reviving their memories and resuming their adventures.

Developed in the wake of the first game's rising popularity, Yo-kai Watch 2 became one of the most highly anticipated releases in Japan in 2014. The games were released to positive critical reception and an overwhelmingly successful commercial response, becoming two of the best-selling games on the Nintendo 3DS, boosted by the established popularity of the Yo-kai Watch anime series and various merchandising efforts. By February 2015, the games had sold 3.1 million copies. A third version of the game, Yo-kai Watch 2: Psychic Specters (Note: Japanese: 妖怪ウォッチ2真打, Hepburn: Yōkai Wotchi Tsū Shin'uchi), was released in Japan in December 2014, which added content not present in original versions of the game. By June 2015, the third version had sold over 2.6 million copies.

On September 9, 2026, a remake of the game titled Yo-kai Watch 2: Haunted Domain (Note: 妖怪ウォッチ2覇道, Yōkai Wotchi Tsū Hadō) was announced to be in development.

== Gameplay ==
The battle system in Yo-kai Watch 2 is almost identical to the first game, but with the new "M Skill" and "Poking" abilities.

Much like its predecessor, Yo-kai Watch 2 is an open world role-playing video game, where the player controls player character Nathan Adams or Katie Forester. Players navigate around the open world, using the Nintendo 3DS' touchscreen to find and befriend various Yo-kai scattered across the overworld. Players can give enemy Yo-kai a food item that they like before or during battle to have a chance at befriending them after winning the battle. After the battle, any of the enemy Yo-kai may approach the player character and give them its Yo-kai Medal, allowing it to be used in the player's team. A new feature in battles is using the Yo-kai Watch Model Zero to use "G Soultimate" moves, which are more powerful Soultimate moves that consume the Soul meters of all adjacent Yo-kai. The Model Zero also allows the use of “Poking”, which uses the touch screen to find a particular sweetspot on an enemy Yo-kai to increase the likelihood of befriending it. Other sweetspots can be poked to gain extra damage, money, or experience. Yo-kai can also be acquired through the Crank-a-kai by collecting in-game coins or using Play Coins. Certain Yo-kai are necessary for completing the game's main quest, and some Yo-kai can be acquired through various subquests. Some Yo-kai can evolve into more powerful versions of themselves if they reach a certain level or combine with a particular item or Yo-kai. The Yo-kai are divided amongst eight different classes called “Tribes”, each with their own strengths and weaknesses. There are also Legendary Yo-kai that can only be obtained by collecting a particular set of Yo-kai listed in the Yo-kai Medallium, a compendium of the different Yo-kai the player has encountered or befriended. When the player encounters a Yo-kai, they battle it using six previously befriended Yo-kai. The touchscreen is used during battles to rotate the player's Yo-kai in battle, clear up status effects on the player's Yo-kai, or charge up the Yo-kai's Soultimate abilities. While the original Yo-kai Watch featured nearly 250 Yo-kai, Yo-kai Watch 2 features nearly 450, including several that were featured as bosses in the original game.

== Synopsis ==
=== Plot ===
While the protagonist is sleeping, two evil Yo-kai steal the Yo-kai Watch and erase their memories of Yo-kai. The next morning, their parents argue over two donut brands: Spirit and Soul Doughnuts. The protagonist went to the Memory Shop, where they re-obtain the Yo-kai Watch and their memories, and reunites with Whisper and Jibanyan. A few days later, the protagonist goes to Springdale Elementary and discovers the Gashadokuro Yo-kai Gutsy Bones there, whom they defeat. The next day, the protagonist encounters a large cat Yo-kai Meganyan who hypnotizes them into traveling to Harrisville, where their grandmother lives. There, they encounter a dispute between two Yo-kai factions: the Bony Spirits and the Fleshy Souls. The following day, they encounter the large Yo-kai Meganyan again, who turns out to be Hovernyan, a cat flyer Yo-kai from 60 years ago who grew drastically after absorbing soul energy over time. Hovernyan tells them that their grandfather needs their help and transports them 60 years in the past using the Time Stone. Upon arriving in the past, they encounter Wicked Yo-kai as well as their grandfather's younger self. After attempting to meet with him, they come across plans he made for building the Yo-kai Watch, and it is revealed he was its creator. As the protagonist searches for pieces to build the Yo-kai Watch Model Zero, they also find and free five Classic Yo-kai who were close to their grandparent. The protagonist later meets the evil Yo-kai duo who stole their Yo-kai Watch and memories: Kin and Gin, Wicked Yo-kai with time-manipulating abilities. After defeating Kin and Gin with help from the Classic Yo-kai, their grandfather accepts them as his "sidekick". Upon returning to the present, Jibanyan runs away following an argument with the protagonist. He encounters Kin and Gin, who make him relive his previous life as a cat named Rudy, who died after sacrificing himself to save his owner Amy from getting hit by a truck. Kin and Gin attempt to convince Jibanyan to let Amy die in his place, but he refuses and is returned to the present. Hovernyan reappears and asks the protagonist to return to the past, where a large battle is occurring between the Bony Spirits and Fleshy Souls, who have been at war for centuries. The protagonist goes to the battlefield in hopes of ceasing the conflict and ends up fighting on behalf of one of the factions. Upon defeating the general of the opposing side, they are told that the war began over an argument about donut fillings. The protagonist's grandfather arrives and reveals that many of the Yo-kai on the battlefield are actually Wicked Yo-kai in disguise. Kin and Gin arrive, followed by their master, Dame Dedtime, who is the boss of the Wicked Yo-kai. Dedtime sends her servant Unfairy to attack the group, but Yo-kai generals Arachnus and Toadal Dude stop him. The protagonist learns of a Yo-kai named Master Nyada, who has the power to fight the Wicked Yo-kai. After finding him and completing his trials, Nyada gives them a hose which they use to defeat Unfairy for good, after which Arachnus and Toadal Dude call a truce. However, Wicked Yo-kai swarm Springdale as Dedtime begins remaking the future in her image and sends the protagonist to a bad future where Springdale is overrun by Wicked Yo-kai. The protagonist finds a way to return to the past and destroys the machines producing the Dedcloud, subsequently storming Dedtime's base as their grandfather and Hovernyan hold off Kin and Gin. The protagonist tries to take down Dedtime, but she is seemingly immortal as a result of Kin and Gin rewinding time. However, Hovernyan helps the player’s grandfather use the Yo-kai Watch Model Zero and subsequently summons his Classic Yo-kai friends, who help them defeat Kin and Gin. The protagonist battles Dedtime again and is able to defeat her. Enraged by her loss, she transforms into a more powerful form, Dame Demona, but the protagonist, his grandfather and crew defeat her, returning the past and present to normal. Afterwards, the protagonist's grandfather promises to finish the Yo-kai Watch and thanks them for everything they have done. The protagonist, Whisper, and Jibanyan then return to their own time.

== Development ==
The games were developed in the wake of the booming popularity of the Yo-kai Watch franchise in Japan. Sequels to the original Yo-kai Watch game were planned from the very beginning, including the plan to split the sequel into two versions, Ganso and Honke. The decision to create two different versions of the game came about as a marketing strategy to appeal to children, and a response to the development team finding that many children and their parents were playing and sharing one copy of the game with each other, thus, two copies of a game would be a plausible resolution.

When planning the first Yo-kai Watch, I already thought to release the sequel as 2 different versions. Children like having things that other people don't have, so from a marketing perspective, having 2 versions is a good idea. Also, a lot of people play Yo-kai Watch with their parents. Where people would have some hesitation about getting 2 copies of the same game, if you have different versions, it is a lot easier to buy both.

— Level-5 CEO Akihiro Hino, interview with Weekly Famitsu

== Marketing ==
A screenshot from the commercial for Yo-kai Watch 2, depicting a crowd of people performing Yo-kai Exercise No. 1. An image of Jibanyan's face appears overhead.

The Yo-kai Watch 2 games were originally revealed in an April 2014 issue of the Japanese manga magazine CoroCoro Comic. The announcement notably came shortly before Level-5 announced that the original Yo-kai Watch had surpassed a milestone of 1 million units shipped. The game's premise and release date, along with improvements upon the original Yo-kai Watch, were detailed in the game's original announcement, which also stated that both the Ganso and Honke versions of Yo-kai Watch 2 would feature Jibanyan Yo-kai Medal toys exclusive to each game, each unlocking a unique Soultimate move for the Jibanyan the player befriends in the game. The games were released on July 10, 2014, both as a physical copy and as a digital download on the Nintendo eShop. A version of the Nintendo 3DS XL, featuring the series' mascot character Jibanyan pictured on the front and the back of the console, was also released concurrently. However, it did not come bundled with either of the Yo-kai Watch games and was sold separately. The limited edition of the console instead came bundled with the six AR cards and a data card featuring the Golnyan Yo-kai, which can be read by the 3DS and used in-game for Yo-kai Watch 2. Unlike the original game, a demo was not released on the Nintendo eShop prior to the games' release, however, an exclusive Nintendo Direct presentation was broadcast on June 4, 2014, highlighting the many new features of the games.

By the time Yo-kai Watch 2 was released, the anime series, airing on the TX Network and TV Tokyo and originally created to promote the first Yo-kai Watch game, had aired over 25 episodes and had become a major contributor to the franchise's growing popularity and sales. The television commercial created to advertise Yo-kai Watch 2 capitalised on the success of the anime series by staging a crowd performing the dance to "Yo-kai Exercise No. 1" by Dream5, the ending theme song for the television series. Under a thousand people were gathered in a shopping mall decorated with Yo-kai Watch banners and imagery to film three commercials that aired during the month of the games' release in Japan. After the successes of Ganso and Honke, an additional third version of the game, Yo-kai Watch 2: Shinuchi, was unveiled by Level-5 in October 2014, once again in an issue of the CoroCoro Comic magazine. Physical releases of the game included a Buchinyan Yo-kai Medal toy, which could be read as a QR code by the Nintendo 3DS system for use in-game. Digital download versions of the game include an additional "Machonyan" Yo-kai. The game's December 2014 release coincided with the theatrical release of Yo-kai Watch: Tanjō no Himitsu da Nyan!, a film based on Yo-kai Watch 2.

Ganso and Honke were localized in English and released on September 30, 2016, in the United States as Bony Spirits and Fleshy Souls, respectively; Bony Spirits and Fleshy Souls subsequently were released in Australia on October 15, 2016 and in Europe on April 7, 2017. Shin'uchi was localized in English as Psychic Specters and released on September 29, 2017, simultaneously in Europe and the United States. Prior to the release of Psychic Specters, the version 2.0 update for Bony Spirits and Fleshy Souls was released as the "Oni Evolution" update on September 14, 2017. "Oni Evolution" enabled the older versions to link and trade data with Psychic Specters.

=== Merchandise ===
Level-5 teamed up with Japanese manufacturers Bandai and Bandai Namco Holdings to create various merchandise to further promote the games. Many different lines of toys were manufactured, the most notable of which are models of the Yo-kai Watch itself, which became one of the best-selling and fastest-selling toys in Japan. The watch, which can be used interactively with separately sold Yo-kai medals, was notable for its constant sellout of stock, and difficulty in finding and obtaining. The short supply of the toy had prompted high second-hand sales of the watch through online auction sites such as eBay, and also caused retailers such as Toys R Us to adopt a raffle ticket system to sell the product. A partnership between Bandai and with fast food restaurant chain McDonald's also saw sets of Aikatsu! cards, featuring Yo-kai Watch characters, being included with the chain's trademark Happy Meal. The popularity of the Aikatsu! cards also caused congestion in many McDonald's restaurants across Japan. Other merchandise released in the wake of Yo-kai Watch 2 include school utensils and office supplies, plushies, tissues, shampoo, bicycles, and even food such as Yo-kai Watch branded cereal, bread, drinks and furikake, amongst other available products.

Bandai Namco have reported having earned ¥10 billion yen (equivalent to $93 million US dollars) off Yo-kai Watch toy lines alone, from April to September 2014. Japanese chart and statistics company Oricon named the Yo-kai Watch brand the second best selling in 2014, behind Disney's Frozen.

== Reception ==
=== Critical reception ===
Reception

Aggregate scores
Aggregator	Score
GameRankings	43% recommend 33% recommend(
Metacritic	(Bony Spirits) 72/100 (Fleshy Souls) 70/100 (Psychic Specters) 73/100

Review scores
Publication	Score
Famitsu	9/10, 9/10, 9/10, 9/10 (Psychic Specters) 9/10, 9/10, 9/10, 9/10
GameSpot	5/10
IGN	5.5/10
Nintendo Life	8.6/10 (Psychic Specters) 9/10

Reviewers from the Japanese video game magazine Famitsu scored both Yo-kai Watch 2: Ganso and Honke a 36 out of 40, with all of the four judges of the review giving the game 9 out of 10; identical to Famitsu's scores for the original Yo-kai Watch The magazine also gave the same score to Yo-kai Watch 2: Shinuchi upon its release in December 2014.

Western reviews were more mixed, with critics praising the game's charm and inclusion of more Yo-kai, but criticized it for not fixing issues that were present in the original game and the padding present in the game. It currently holds a 72 for Bony Spirits and a 70 for Fleshy Souls on Metacritic.

The reviews for Psychic Specters on the other hand were slightly more favourable, with it holding a 73 on Metacritic.

== Sequel ==
The sequel to the games, also featuring a dual release with the secondary titles branding Yo-kai Watch 3: Sushi and Tempura, were released in Japan on July 16, 2016. A third version of the game, branded Yo-kai Watch 3: Sukiyaki, was released in Japan on December 15, 2016. Sukiyaki was localized for English speakers without the secondary branding, released in PAL regions on December 7, 2018, and in North America on February 8, 2019.
