= OverBlood =

1996 video game

- North American cover art
- Developer: Riverhillsoft
- Publishers: JP: Riverhillsoft; NA/EU: Electronic Arts
- Producer: Junji Shigematsu
- Designer: Kenichiro Hayashi
- Programmer: Akihiro Hino
- Composer: Hiroaki Iwatani
- Platform: PlayStation
- Release: JP: August 2, 1996; NA: May 20, 1997; EU: June 1997
- Genres: Adventure, survival horror
- Mode: Single-player

OverBlood (オーバーブラッド, ŌbāBuraddo) is a survival horror video game developed by Riverhillsoft and first released for the PlayStation in 1996. It was described by Richard H. Hand as the first survival horror game to make use of a fully three-dimensional virtual environment. The game received mixed reviews from critics.

OverBlood was released on the Japanese PlayStation Network Store on February 23, 2011. In 1998, a sequel titled Overblood 2 was released.

== Gameplay ==
A GameSpot reviewer described OverBlood as an graphic adventure game that incorporates elements of other genres such as "arcade-style action title, a fighting game, an old-fashioned text adventure, and a puzzle game." Academics Richard J Hand and Bernard Herron described it as a survival horror game. The player is able to toggle the camera between first- and third-person, both of which are required to solve the game's various puzzles.

== Synopsis ==
=== Plot ===
Overblood takes place at Lystra Laboratories' hidden research center where a team of scientists have been conducting controversial genetic experiments. The game begins when a system malfunction releases the player character, Raz Karcy (Lars in European releases), from a cryogenic container. Cold and confused, he awakens with no memory. Concerns about his identity are soon replaced by an urgent need to escape, as he reveals the scientists' fateful plan and his role in it.

=== Characters ===
The game features three playable characters. The majority of the game is played as Raz Karcy, the game's protagonist. Other playable characters include Milly Azray, a woman who befriends Raz, and Pipo, a small and very helpful robot.

== Reception and legacy ==
Reception

Review scores
Publication	Score
Electronic Gaming Monthly	7.375/10
Famitsu	6/10, 5/10, 7/10, 7/10
GameFan	220/300
GameSpot	5.3/10
IGN	6.0/10
Next Generation	2/5
Dengeki PlayStation	75/100, 70/100, 75/100, 60/100

Reviews for Overblood were mixed, with critics generally commenting that it has enough interesting elements to make it respectable, but is ultimately not worth buying. The most frequent criticism was that the game is too slow-paced and lacking in tension, with too much time spent wandering corridors and opening doors, relatively little time spent on puzzles, and far too little time spent on action sequences. Compounding this problem, many critics found the action sequences too simplistic. Joe Fielder elaborated in GameSpot that "They entail moving at just the right moment and are more timing than skill-based."

The need to switch between three different playable characters in order to solve certain puzzles was often cited as one of OverBlood's most interesting aspects. Some also praised the story. The game was reviewed by GameFan Magazine, where the game's previously rumored similarities to Resident Evil were dismissed and strong comparisons drawn instead to Doctor Hauzer for which Overblood (created by the same development team) serves as a spiritual successor. The game was criticized for the appearance of the characters, their unrealistic movements, and the overall plot, and the game received low marks for play mechanics and controls. IGN stated, "OverBlood attempts to recreate the moodiness and horror of Resident Evil but never quite succeeds." Crispin Boyer of Electronic Gaming Monthly made the same unfavorable comparison to Resident Evil, but concluded more positively: "That's OK, because Overblood is still an engrossing adventure ... that packs a solid mix of puzzles and exploration." Next Generation, by contradiction, stated that "Despite the excellent graphics, the game just can't hold a player's interest. OverBlood could've used a little more action and a lot less wandering around." German magazine Maniac gave it a score of 68 out of 100.
