= Yo-kai Watch (video game) =

2013 role-playing video game

- North American packaging artwork
- Developer: Level-5
- Publishers: JP: Level-5; WW: Nintendo
- Director: Ken Motomura
- Producer: Akihiro Hino
- Designer: Akihiro Hino
- Programmers: Yuji Mori; Tetsuo Mori
- Artists: Nobuyuki Yanai; Takuzō Nagano; Miho Tanaka
- Writer: Akihiro Hino
- Composer: Kenichiro Saigo
- Series: Yo-kai Watch
- Platforms: Nintendo 3DS; Nintendo Switch; Android; iOS
- Release: July 11, 2013: Nintendo 3DS; JP: July 11, 2013; NA: November 6, 2015; AU: December 5, 2015; EU: April 29, 2016 Nintendo Switch; JP: October 10, 2019 Android, iOS; JP: July 10, 2021
- Genres: Role-playing, Auto battler
- Modes: Single-player, multiplayer

Yo-kai Watch (Japanese: 妖怪ウォッチ, Hepburn: Yōkai Wotchi) is a role-playing video game developed and published by Level-5 for the Nintendo 3DS and the first game in the Yo-kai Watch franchise. Originally released in Japan on July 11, 2013, the game is based on the Yōkai of Japanese folklore, who are said to be ghosts and apparitions that cause mischief in daily life. In Yo-kai Watch, player character Nathan "Nate" Adams or Katie Forester, depending on who the player chooses, is given the titular Yo-kai Watch, which gives him or her the ability to see Yo-kai after stumbling across and befriending the butler Yo-kai Whisper. Players assume the role of Nate or Katie, as he or she travels around town searching for and befriending peaceful Yo-kai, battling hostile Yo-kai, and solving problems caused by mischievous Yo-kai.

The game received a positive commercial and critical reception in Japan, and a steady rise in popularity started a franchise, including a toy line and an anime series, in addition to Yo-kai Watch 2, released the following year for the Nintendo 3DS. Despite the franchise's success in Japan, the game would not be released internationally until 2015, when Nintendo announced plans to localize the game in the West. By November 2014, the game had sold over a million copies in Japan, making it one of the best selling games on the Nintendo 3DS.

== Plot ==
While on a bug-collecting school assignment in suburban Springdale, the player visits Mount Wildwood and discovers an unusual capsule machine from which they free Whisper, a ghost-like Yo-kai who gives them the Yo-kai Watch, enabling them to see Yo-kai. The player befriends Cadin and his best friend Buhu before returning home with Whisper, only to find that the Yo-kai Dismeralda has sneaked in while they're gone and has managed to inspirit their parents, causing them to argue about whether they should fix dinner or chores. Dismeralda refuses to leave, so the player summons Cadin to fight her, but she proves to be too strong for him. The player and Whisper befriend 3 more Yo-Kai, head to an intersection and meet Jibanyan, who joins them and the others to fight Dismeralda. She and her husband Happiere reconcile and he inspirits the player's parents, ending their conflict. Dismeralda then befriends the player before she and Happiere leave.

The next day, the player visits their friend, who is upset they unintentionally said mean things to their friend. Upon realizing a Yo-kai is responsible, the player finds and befriends Tattletell, who inspirits their friend and allows them to reconcile with their friend. With the issue resolved, Tattletell reveals that a group of evil Yo-kai had broken several seals, disrupting the link between the human and Yo-kai worlds. The player and Whisper defeat the evil Yo-kai and repair the seals, but not before it frees Slimamander. The two are ultimately saved by a mysterious powerful Yo-kai.

The player and Whisper decide to head to Timers and More, run by Mr. Goodsight, to upgrade their Yo-kai Watch and be able to befriend stronger Yo-kai. In the process, The player befriends Baku, encounters the Oni for the first time, and fights and defeats Sproink.

The next day, after Bear uses his mother's ring as bait to catch the "king of Catfish Pond" and accidentally loses it, his father instructs him to retrieve it. The player and Whisper head to a riverside to find the kappa Yo-kai Walkappa and the ring, only to disturb the Yo-kai SV Snaggerjag. After the battle, Snaggerjag reveals he is the guardian of Catfish Pond and that the group had disturbed the catfish in the area. Afterward, the ring is returned.

The next morning, while on his way to work, the player's father accidentally loses important documents after being inspirited by Wazzat. While retrieving the documents, they befriend Wazzat and receive a bicycle as thanks for saving their father's job. Soon after, they hear rumors about development at Flower Road and encounter the powerful Yo-kai Kyubi, who blackmails them into entering the construction zone at night. In the process, the player and Whisper meet Komasan. They also find that Kyubi had led them to the true culprit: Massiface. After the player defeats Massiface, the rumors stop and Kyubi muses about a greater conflict.

The player visits an art museum with their friend Eddie, who asks them to accompany him in sneaking to the museum at night. After being warped into the museum by Mirapo and evading the museum's security protocols, they battle and defeat Phantasmurai, a suit of armor controlled by a mouse Eddie was trying to observe.

Soon after, the player's friends meet up with them at the school to explore it at night, but are attacked by Tarantulor, a spider-like Yo-kai. It abducts their friends, and they and Whisper are forced to find them. They find their friend in the bathroom, but are attacked by Tarantutor. After defeating it, Whisper becomes suspicious and asks the player to return to the school and search for more clues. With the help of the Yo-kai Draggie, they discover that the abandoned Nocturne Hospital has unusual Yo-kai activity as a result of Doctor Maddiman, who they fight and defeat after he attempts to murder them. The defeated doctor cries out to Yo-kai World Chairman Squiddilius McKraken, his master, who begins transmitting through Draggie's crystal ball, revealing himself to be a dissident Yo-kai politician who has been gathering support in the Yo-kai World to launch an invasion of the human world and subjugate humanity.

The player's classmate Lucas reveals he is a Yo-kai related to Ancient Enma, the deceased ruler of the Yo-kai World and the three venture to the Yo-kai World to seek answers. They are confronted by the Yo-kai who saved them from Slimamander, Venoct, who states Lucas was Ancient Enma's heir son and was hidden to protect him from McKraken's threat. McKraken is confronted and seemingly defeated, but upon returning to the human world, they find that the seals have been broken once more, McKraken has deployed his minions in the area, and Slimamander has reawakened. The player defeats McKracken's minions and restores the seals, before they and everyone defeat a mutated McKraken engorged on spirit energy and cause him to explode. Whisper, knowing that more evil Yo-kai will take advantage of McKraken's defeat, closes the elevator linking the two worlds, which the player reluctantly accepts. In a post-credits scene, the elevator is rebuilt thanks to Lucas acting as a mediator, allowing the Yo-kai to return.

== Gameplay ==
The battle system in Yo-kai Watch. The player uses a spin dial on the touchscreen to switch between Yo-kai during battle.

Yo-kai Watch is a role-playing video game where the player searches around Springdale for Yo-kai using the 3DS' touchscreen. Players befriend Yo-kai by giving them a food item that they like before or during battle, and after defeating the Yo-kai it may or may not approach the player character and gives them its Yo-kai Medal, allowing it to be used in the player's team. Yo-kai can also be acquired through an in-game Gasha Machine by collecting in-game coins or using Play Coins. Certain Yo-kai are necessary for completing the game's main quest, and special rare Yo-kai are acquired through various subquests. Yo-kai have the capability to evolve into more powerful versions of themselves if they reach a certain level, or they can evolve by combining with particular items or other Yo-kai. The Yo-kai are divided amongst eight different tribes, each with their own strengths and weaknesses. There are also Legendary Yo-kai that can only be obtained by collecting a particular set of Yo-kai listed in the Yo-kai Medallium, a compendium of the different Yo-kai the player has encountered or befriended.

When the player encounters a Yo-kai, they enter into battle with it using six Yo-kai that the player has befriended previously, and the enemy Yo-kai may bring other Yo-kai to fight with them. The touchscreen is used during battles to rotate amongst the player's Yo-kai in battle at will. It is also used either to clear up status effects on the player's Yo-kai or to charge up the Yo-kai's special abilities. A common in-game event is "Oni Time" (Terror Time), where the player character enters a nightmare realm where he or she looks for treasure chests with special items in them all while trying to avoid being seen by other Yo-kai. If spotted, the player is chased by a powerful Oni Yo-kai that can easily wipe out the player's party unless they can escape. It is possible to defeat the Oni, but only if the player's Yo-kai are particularly powerful. The player can also encounter similarly powerful Namahage Yo-kai if the player crosses the street on a red light, but the encounter may be beneficial if the player follows the rules.

== Development ==
Yo-kai Watch was developed by Level-5, a Japanese video game developer based in Fukuoka, Japan. Before Yo-kai Watch, Level-5 were best known for their Professor Layton series of puzzle adventure games for the Nintendo DS, one of the best selling game series on the platform, with 15 million units sold across six titles. At a time where Level-5 were already successful with resonating with younger gamers with multiple IPs such as Inazuma Eleven and Ni no Kuni, many of the Level-5 staff expressed interest in creating, in Level-5 CEO Akihiro Hino's words, the new Doraemon; a title that would "be loved by many people over a long period of time". The team agreed that such a title would be an open world role-playing game.

We've created a lot of different IPs, and I figured it was about time that we made something like Doraemon, that could be loved by many people over a long period of time. That was the start of it. I researched what would give something appeal and longevity, and pondered what would be relatable to people and developed the open world RPG that children could play, Yo-kai Watch. I think title's popularity is the fruits of trial and error.

— Akihiro Hino, interview with Weekly Famitsu

== Marketing and release ==
Yo-kai Watch was officially unveiled to the public by Level-5 at the 2011 Tokyo Game Show, where it was announced during the company's annual Level-5 Vision press conference. It was planned from the start that Yo-kai Watch would be a franchise that consisted of a manga and anime series. A manga series by Noriyuki Konishi began serialization in CoroCoro Comic from December 15, 2012. This series has been licensed by Viz Media under its Perfect Square imprint. The series went on to earn awards for best Children's Manga at the 2014 Kodansha Manga Awards and at the 2015 Shogakukan Manga Awards. Prior to the release of Yo-kai Watch in Japan, a game demo was made available to download from the Nintendo eShop on July 3, 2013.

After the success of the game and its sequel, Yo-kai Watch 2, a localization of the franchise in territories outside Japan was seriously considered. After registering a trademark for the Yo-kai Watch brand in the United States in January 2014, and inviting public opinion on an international release of the game, Level-5 formally announced in April 2015 that the game would indeed be released in the United States, Europe, Australia, New Zealand, Latin America, and Korea, with Nintendo helping to publish the game outside Japan. At E3 2015, a trailer for the game was showcased during Nintendo's Digital Event presentation, and demos of the game were available to play on the show floor during the convention. A release window of Holiday 2015 was also announced at the convention, with the date being further clarified to a November 6 release in North America by the time the game was showcased at the EB Games Expo. A demo for the game was released on the Nintendo eShop in North America on October 22, 2015. The game was also sold as a bundle with the Nintendo 2DS in North America, selling under $100.

An anime series based on the video game premiered on the TX Network, owned by TV Tokyo, on January 8, 2014, six months after the Japanese release of the game. The series has run continuously on TV Tokyo since then, including a rebranding as a "Second Season" featuring new characters from the upcoming Yo-kai Watch 3 game. As part of efforts to localize Yo-kai Watch in western countries, the series was broadcast in the United States; dubbed in English and premiered on Disney XD on October 5, 2015, a month before the release of the game in North America. The series was broadcast in Australia on GO! in 2016.

In July 2019, Level-5 announced the first game in the series would be ported to the Nintendo Switch as Yo-kai Watch 1; the port was released in Japan on October 10, 2019. While the original 3DS version had various international releases and supported languages, Yo-kai Watch 1 only supported Japanese. Yo-kai Watch 1 was later ported to iOS and Android devices in Japan on July 10, 2021.

== Reception ==
Reception

Aggregate scores
| Aggregator | Score |
|---|---|
| Metacritic | 76/100 |
| OpenCritic | 57% recommend |

Review scores
| Publication | Score |
|---|---|
| Destructoid | 8.5/10 |
| Edge | 6/10 |
| Famitsu | 36/40 |
| Game Informer | 8.5/10 |
| GamesRadar+ | 3.5/5 |
| IGN | 7.2/10 |
| Nintendo Life | 7/10 |
| Nintendo World Report | 9/10 |

Japanese video game magazine Famitsu scored the game a 36 out of 40, with all of the four judges of the review giving the game 9 out of 10. Editor Reona Ebihara wrote that "the game gradually expands its feature set as you go, opening up this very unique world that's easy to melt into." She also commented positively of the game's use of the Nintendo 3DS' stereoscopic features and its "simple and deeply strategic" battle system. Fellow reviewer Urara Honma corroborated Ebihara's remarks, stating that the battle system felt "really great to control". She further wrote, "You won't run into much frustration playing this game, and while it does feel like one big fetch quest at times, the charms of the story more than make up for that." IGN awarded it a score of 7.2 out of 10, saying "Yo-kai Watch's gameplay is inconsistent, but its world is compelling."

During the 19th Annual D.I.C.E. Awards, the Academy of Interactive Arts & Sciences nominated Yo-kai Watch for "Handheld Game of the Year".

=== Sales ===
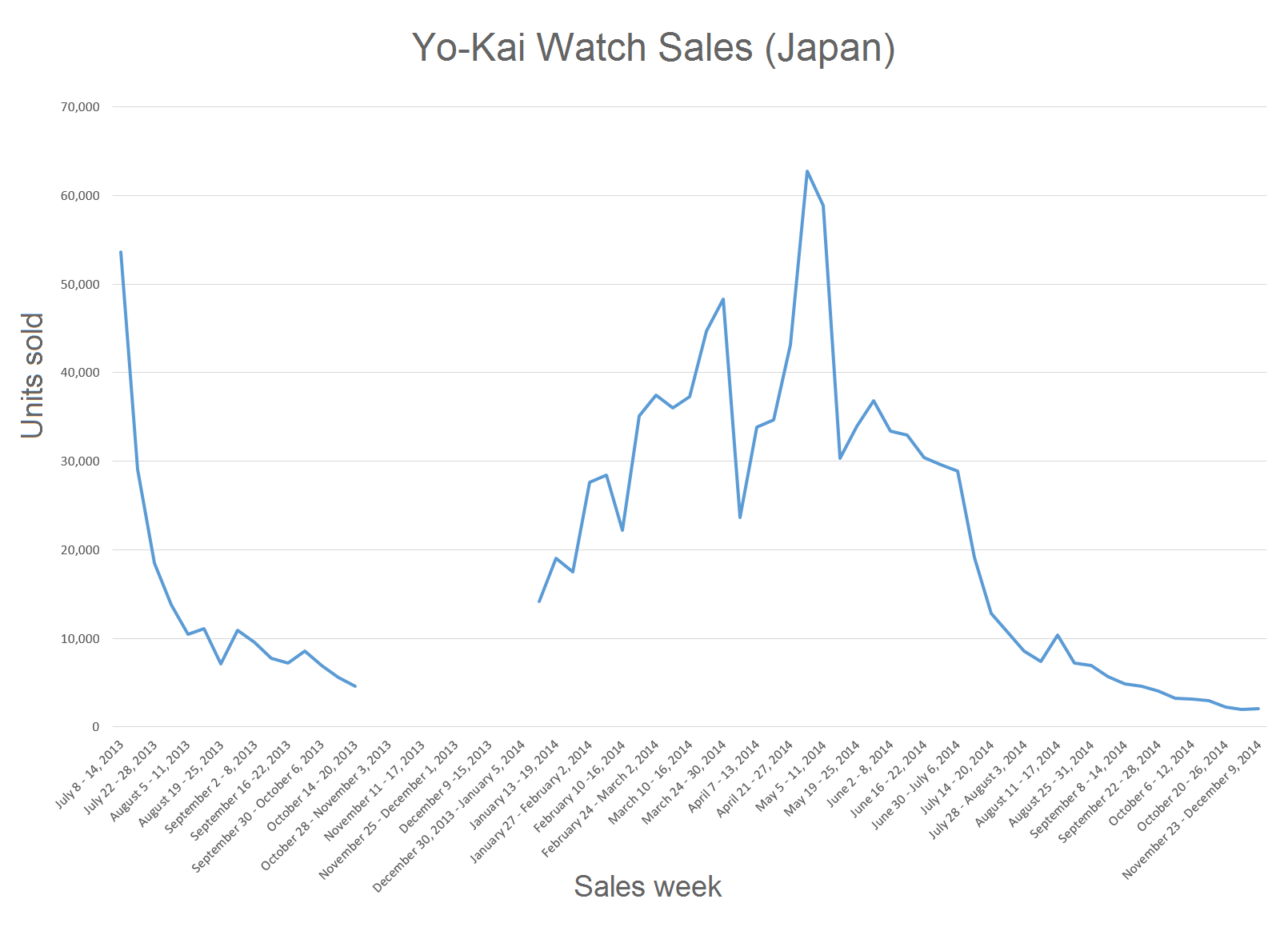
A chart depicting weekly sales of Yo-kai Watch in Japan from July 2013 to December 2014

Yo-kai Watch debuted with a strong opening week, selling over 53,000 units in its first week of availability; the best selling handheld game in Japan and second-best selling game in Japan for that week, beaten only by Nintendo's 92,000 unit sales for Pikmin 3. In a list published at the end of the year, Japanese video game magazine Famitsu named Yo-kai Watch as the 23rd best selling game in Japan, with just over 280,000 units sold. After the debut of the Yo-kai Watch anime in January 2014, Level-5, a month later, reported that the sales numbers for the game had spiked to over 500,000 physical copies of the game sold alone, without including digital download sales. The number was brought up to over 800,000, including digital sales, after sales tracker Media Create reported the game had sold as much by May 2015, though, Famitsu reported a more conservative estimate of 650,000 in the same time frame. The month earlier, however, Level-5 reported that they had, in fact, shipped 1 million units, with Level-5 CEO Akihiro Hino stating, in an interview with Famitsu, that he believed that the game would reach the million sales mark soon. By June, a month before the release of the game's sequel, Yo-kai Watch 2, the game had crossed the million sales milestone, according to Media Create, after a steady increase of weekly sales since January 2014. By November 2014, the game had sold a total of just under 1,294,000 units sold in Japan. As of June 10, 2016, the game sold 400,000 units in North America. Although that number was below Level-5's expectations, it still got the Yo-kai Watch franchise off to a promising start overseas, and instilled confidence that the franchise would find its place.

The Nintendo Switch port sold 9,426 copies in its first week on sale, placing 4th overall for software sales.

== Sequels ==
A sequel to Yo-kai Watch was released on July 10, 2014, for the Nintendo 3DS in two versions: Yo-kai Watch 2: Ganso (妖怪ウォッチ2 元祖, Yōkai Wotchi 2 Ganso) and Yo-kai Watch 2: Honke (妖怪ウォッチ2 本家, Yōkai Wotchi 2 Honke). Borrowing near-identical gameplay elements from the original Yo-kai Watch, the games featured an expanded setting, a brand-new story, additional game modes, and a broadly expanded roster of Yo-kai. The games were released to positive critical reception, and an overwhelmingly successful commercial performance was boosted by the popularity of the anime and the preceding game. Both versions of the game accumulated pre-order sales of over 800,000, with the games selling over 1.28 million units in their first week of sale. The games would go on to become the best selling games in Japan for 2014, selling over 3 million copies by December and outperforming Nintendo's Pokémon franchise with Pokémon Omega Ruby and Alpha Sapphire and Capcom's Monster Hunter franchise, with Monster Hunter 4 Ultimate. The games join Yo-kai Watch as two of the best selling games on the Nintendo 3DS. A third version of the game, Yo-kai Watch 2: Shinuchi (妖怪ウォッチ2 真打, Yōkai Wotchi 2 Shin'uchi), was released in December 2014, adding enhancements to the original Ganso and Honke versions of the game.

Yo-kai Watch 3 was originally released in Japan in July 2016 across two versions, Sushi and Tempura, followed by a third version, Sukiyaki, in December 2016. Unlike its predecessors, the game's setting is split between the fictional Japanese city of Springdale and a United States-inspired localization called St. Peanutsburg. It was later localized for Western markets, launching in Europe on 7 December 2018 and in North America on 8 February 2019. The international release combined the content of all three Japanese editions into a single definitive game.

A fourth mainline entry, Yo-kai Watch 4: We're Looking Up at the Same Sky, was released in Japan for the Nintendo Switch on 20 June 2019. An enhanced definitive edition, Yo-kai Watch 4++, was released on 5 December 2019, which also ported the game to the PlayStation 4. Although Level-5 initially announced plans to localize Yo-kai Watch 4 for Western audiences at Anime Expo 2019, the international release was ultimately cancelled following the closure of Level-5's North American operations and a decline in overseas popularity.

Following a hiatus for the mainline series, Level-5 announced a major shift for the franchise at its Level-5 Vision 2024 showcase. The company unveiled Holy Horror Mansion, a "Ghost Craft RPG" described as the spiritual successor to Yo-kai Watch, featuring entirely new characters and mechanics. In September 2026, Level-5 officially announced Yo-kai Watch 2: Haunted Domain, a comprehensive next-generation remake of Yo-kai Watch 2 being developed for the Nintendo Switch 2.
