= Fantasy Life i: The Girl Who Steals Time =

2025 video game

- Developer: Level-5
- Publisher: Level-5
- Director: Yugo Nakajima
- Producers: Akihiro Hino; Takao Hattori
- Programmer: Toshi Sato
- Artist: Hiroshi Matsuyama
- Composers: Nobuo Uematsu; Haruno Ito
- Engine: Unreal Engine 5
- Platforms: Nintendo Switch; PlayStation 4; PlayStation 5; Windows; Xbox Series X/S; Nintendo Switch 2; Android; iOS
- Release: Switch, PS4, PS5, Windows, Series X/S; May 21, 2025; Switch 2; June 5, 2025; Android, iOS; August 20, 2026
- Genres: Life simulation, role-playing
- Mode: Single-player

Fantasy Life i: The Girl Who Steals Time (Note: Japanese: ファンタジーライフｉ グルグルの竜と時をぬすむ少女, Hepburn: Fantajīraifu i Guruguru no Ryū to Toki o Nusumu Shōjo) is a 2025 role-playing, life simulation game developed and published by Level-5. The sequel to Fantasy Life, it was released for Nintendo Switch, PlayStation 4, PlayStation 5, Windows, and Xbox Series X/S in May 2025, with a Nintendo Switch 2 version released in June 2025 as a launch title. Versions for Android and iOS were released in August 2026.

== Gameplay ==
Like its predecessor, Fantasy Life i: The Girl Who Steals Time is a role-playing life simulation game set on an island in Reveria, in which players can choose from any of the fourteen jobs known as "life classes". Gameplay centers upon the player taking on various tasks given to them and switching between the fourteen Life classes to access different tasks. Time travel is featured in the game as players will be able to build up a ruined island by traveling a thousand years into the island's future.

== Development ==
Fantasy Life i: The Girl Who Steals Time was announced for release in 2023 before being delayed twice, once to 2024 and again to April 2025. The game released for Nintendo Switch, PlayStation 4, PlayStation 5, Windows, and Xbox Series X/S on May 21, 2025. The game was originally headed by producer Keiji Inafune, until he left the company in 2024, and Level-5 CEO Akihiro Hino had to step in as producer. A Nintendo Switch 2 version, featuring enhanced visuals and performance compared to the Switch version, released alongside the system on June 5, 2025.

On September 24, 2025, Level-5 announced that a free DLC titled "The Sinister Broker Bazario's Schemes" would be released in December of that year. The DLC released on December 24, 2025.

== Reception ==
Reception

Aggregate scores
Aggregator	Score
Metacritic	PS5: 80/100; Switch: 86/100; PC: 86/100; Switch 2: 86/100
OpenCritic	96% recommend

Review scores
Publication	Score
Famitsu	36/40
IGN	9/10

Fantasy Life i received "generally favorable" reviews according to the review aggregator website Metacritic. Fellow review aggregator OpenCritic assessed that the game received "mighty" approval, being recommended by 96% of critics.

Travis Northup of IGN described Fantasy Life i as "nailing the balance between slice-of-life cozy activities, village building, and its more action-packed tasks," drawing parallels to series such as Animal Crossing, The Legend of Zelda, and The Sims.

On May 24, 2025, Level-5 announced that Fantasy Life i had sold over 500,000 copies worldwide. On June 2, Level-5 announced that the game had sold over 800,000 copies. On June 12, Level-5 announced that the game had sold over 1,000,000 copies.

=== Awards ===
Year	Award	Category	Result	Ref.
2025	Japan Game Awards	Award for Excellence	Won	
