= OverBlood 2 =

1998 video game

- European cover art
- Developer: Riverhillsoft
- Publishers: JP: Riverhillsoft; EU: Evolution Games
- Director: Akihiro Hino
- Designer: Akihiro Hino
- Writer: Akihiro Hino
- Composer: Hiroaki Iwatani
- Platform: PlayStation
- Release: JP: July 23, 1998; EU (Event): June 3, 1999; EU (EON): April 13, 2001
- Genre: Action-adventure
- Mode: Single-player

OverBlood 2 (オーバーブラッド2, ŌbāBuraddo Tsū) is an action-adventure video game developed by Riverhillsoft for the PlayStation. It was published in Japan by Riverhillsoft on July 23, 1998, while a European version saw release from Evolution Games on June 3, 1999. It is the sequel to OverBlood (1997), released on the same platform. The plot takes place in 2115, and revolves around a team of freedom fighters in a war against a corrupt corporation that plans on escaping to another planet and leaving all life on Earth for dead.

== Gameplay ==
The game features an introduction and seven episodes, plus a hidden bonus episode unlocked by earning 2000 Clear Points. Between most of the episodes, which are all set in different locations, the player generally has the option to explore the main city where the game begins in order to buy items, weapons, talk to non player characters and find hidden perks in the game.

A free-camera view allows the player to control their view within the 3D environment. The game makes several references to the previous title, most noticeably with the character Raz Karcy the protagonist from the first game.

== Plot ==
Overblood 2 takes place in December, 2115. Seventy years after "Earth's Sudden Death", a sudden rise in global temperature caused by unknown reasons. The catastrophe led to the death of 20% of the human population. Ultimately, Earth's climate was stabilized by the construction of 87 air cooling towers all over the globe. The primary setting of the game is East Edge City, an artificial island city located off the southern coast of New York and the site of the 80th air cooling tower.

The game opens with ITP agent Chris Lanebecca tracking Veltor Curtis under orders from her superiors. Upon arriving at East Edge terminal, the main protagonist Acarno Brani, an ambitious Junk Blade pilot, has a premonition of Veltor being attacked. Veltor is then ambushed by a powerful, mutating villain called Kondo. Despite assistance from Chris, Acarno is unable to rescue Veltor, who gives Acarno a mysterious capsule and tells him to escape. After reaching safety Acarno examines the capsule and hears the name "D-NA" before the message cuts out. Acarno decides to explore East Edge, eventually coming across a bar named "D-NA", and inquires with the bartender Raz Karcy. After some initial reluctance Raz informs Acarno about a conspiracy involving a secret project being worked on by Hayano Industries. Raz offers Acarno financial assistance towards the Junk Blade Championships in exchange for helping to uncover the truth about the project.

Meanwhile, Kondo reports to his boss, Ryu-ichi Hayano the CEO of Hayano Industries, about the failure to retrieve the capsule and the interference of Acarno. Raz sends Acarno to Billboard Island to recruit Navarro Jean, an old colleague of Raz, and acquire a map of Hayano's Pagoda building. As Acarno traverses the island he is captured by Navarro, who interrogates Acarno about his motives. However, the interrogation is cut short when the ITP ambushes Billboard Island on Hayano's orders. Acarno is freed and assists Navarro defending against the attack before escaping aboard Navarro's hover vessel. Upon returning to Raz's bar, Acarno discovers Chris has joined the group after running into Raz at the dock. Raz and Navarro reveal they, along with Veltor, worked on a secret government project before each of them had their memories erased and their laboratories destroyed to cover it up. Raz believes the information about the project lies within the Pagoda. Navarro and Chris agree to assist Raz, Acarno initially declines but reconsiders after seeing a vision of his deceased sister Nina, who tells him she is in the Pagoda.

Acarno, Chris, and Navarro infiltrate the Pagoda, where Navarro hacks the main terminal and the computer reveals that the secret government project is codenamed: Meridian. The air cooling machines only have approximately ten years before all their energy is depleted, so Meridian was designed as a failsafe that uses the remaining cooling machine energy to send a select number of humans to a new world, dooming Earth to die within a year. As they are about to leave, Kondo shows up to deal with the intruders. Nina then appears as a hologram revealing she is part of the computer system, temporarily subduing Kondo before disappearing. Acarno demonstrates a rare ability to harness Xeno-Rays, which he uses to fend off Kondo, before Hayano orders Kondo to stand down.

Back at Raz's bar the group agree they need to stop Meridian from being completed or all life on earth will die. They deduce the project must be underground in an abandoned area of the city and send Acarno to investigate. After infiltrating the construction site and attempting to sabotage the Meridian, Acarno is assisted with his escape by a man named Kim Hosaka. Returning to Raz's bar, Hosaka introduces himself and says he's been working on a way to supply more energy to the cooling towers. He believes a Hull drive could power the cooling towers indefinitely but Navarro argues that it is just a myth. Hosaka tells the group he has information about the Hull drive but he needs Acarno's help to retrieve it from his informant. He and Acarno attend a ball held by Hayano, where Acarno dances with the informant who hands him a data chip concealed within a rose. As Acarno and Hosaka leave they discover the ball was a trap set by Hayano and are forced to fight their way out.

After escaping back to Raz's, Hosaka reveals that the Hull drive is already built and takes the group to a secret underground facility where it is housed. Hosaka asks Raz and Navarro to help complete the drive before telling Acarno and Chris they also need Veltor's help to finish it. Hosaka informs the pair Veltor is being held in a high security prison in South America and the three go and rescue him. After reuniting Veltor with Raz and Navarro, the three attempt to start up the Hull drive but are unsuccessful. Veltor wonders if the original creator of the drive, Dr Marius, would be able to help but she disappeared decades previously. Acarno decides to spend some time around East Edge city and is nearly arrested by the local police but is saved by an orphan. The orphan inadvertently reveals he knows Dr Marius and leads Acarno to her. When Acarno meets Dr Marius, she communicates with him telepathically. She tells Acarno that she is known as a "Traveller", a super-human like being that evolved because of the climate disaster so humans could survive the harsh conditions of earth. Acarno is also a "Traveller" as was his sister, which is the reason she was kidnapped and experimented on when she was a child. Marius informs Acarno she was afraid people would misuse the Hull drive so hid her research and went into hiding. Marius asks Acarno to help her complete the Hull drive to which he agrees.

Meanwhile Dr Xeno, the real mastermind behind Meridian, launches the ship draining all remaining power from the cooling towers. Hayano gets wind of this and attempts to stop Xeno, but Xeno has him killed when he lowers the shield around the Meridian's bridge during a missile attack. Acarno, Hosake, Chris, and Navarro infiltrate the ship and confront Xeno. Xeno threatens to destroy the world's cities unless Acarno cooperates with him. Acarno reluctantly agrees and is taken to Xeno's lab. Xeno reveals he wants Acarno's powers as a "Traveller" to help build his own abilities, which he developed after experimenting on Nina. He also reveals he has created an army of super-humans, which he calls "OverBloods." Acarno chooses to fight instead and defeats Xeno, but Xeno attempts to go through with his plan to destroy the world's cities. Fortunately, Hosaka thwarts him by taking control of the ship, revealing he is the real Ryu-ichi Hayano. The other Hayano was a clone created by his father after he abandoned the Meridian project in search of a better way to save the Earth.

Navarro sets the Meridian's reactor to self-destructive before everyone escapes the ship. However, Xeno pulls one last trick, injecting himself with a mutating virus that transforms him into a monster. Acarno choses to stay behind and deal with Xeno while the others escape. Upon defeating Xeno once and for all, Nina appears and shows Acarno a Junk Blade he can use to escape, before passing on. Back at the Hull drive, Raz, Veltor, and Navarro get the drive working and restore power to the cooling machines. Dr Marius passes on upon seeing the completion of her life's work, leaving a final message of hope for the world. In a post credit scene, Raz and Navarro are discussing recent events. Chris is on a new assignment, while Hosaka has taken charge of Hayano Industries with Veltor's help. The two then hear over the radio that Acarno has become the new World Junk Blade Champion.

== Development ==
The game was announced in August 1997. Mark Estdale, an industry veteran, looked back on his work on the localization of the game in an interview with GameCulture. He stated, "I read the script. It was awful, translated to English from Japanese by Italians so I suggested rewriting the English to match the stylized Japanese, or making it into an acted comedy or to scrap the whole thing. I was told the script was perfect and couldn't be changed and that we must do it with seriousness. We squirmed and the actors wept. When the game finally came out we discovered amongst many painfully awful mistranslations that the hand bomb throwing device was a grenade launcher and the whorehouse key level was actually a warehouse."

The director of the game was Akihiro Hino, who previously worked as a programmer on the first game. He would later become the CEO of developer Level-5, which he founded just a few months after the release of the game. He would later reflect back on his experience developing the series, stating, "On Overblood 1, I was programming all by myself. On Overblood2, I was directing, planning and writing scenarios. Those were some of my most hardworking days. That's the way I liked it, but I really couldn't sleep then."

== Reception ==
In an import review of the game, GameSpot criticized the excessively long cutscenes, along with the slow performance of the game engine. OPM UK criticised the game as a "pale imitation of Final Fantasy VII with its heart ripped out" and gave it a score of 4 out of 10.

The OverBlood series was the subject of the online video blog series Super Replay by the editors of Game Informer magazine. During the Super Replay, the editors criticized the lack of the ability to skip cutscenes, the convoluted storyline and the general lack of direction. They occasionally praised it for its ambition.

== Repress ==
In 1999, when the PAL version was first released in Europe, players reported a game-breaking glitch in Episode 2, where upon entering a doorway with any of the three characters, the game would freeze due to the amount of enemy assets that spawned on the other side. This was later patched in 2001, by repressing the game entirely, branded under Eon Digital Entertainment. Since the PlayStation's release, the game has been tested on both the PlayStation 2 and PlayStation 3 systems, all displaying the same freeze issue.
