= Fantasy Life =

2012 video game

- North American cover art
- Developer: Level-5 (Note: Assistance by Brownie Brown and h.a.n.d.)
- Publisher: Nintendo: JP: Level-5
- Director: Atsushi Kanno
- Producer: Akihiro Hino
- Artist: Takuzou Nagano
- Writer: Akihiro Hino
- Composer: Nobuo Uematsu
- Platform: Nintendo 3DS
- Release: JP: December 27, 2012; EU: September 26, 2014; AU: September 27, 2014; NA: October 24, 2014
- Genres: Role-playing, life simulation
- Mode: Single-player

Fantasy Life (Note: Japanese: ファンタジーライフ, Hepburn: Fantajī Raifu) is a 2012 role-playing life simulation game developed and published by Level-5 for the Nintendo 3DS. The game was originally released in Japan in 2012, with Nintendo releasing the game internationally in 2014. The game was written and produced by Akihiro Hino with music by Nobuo Uematsu. A sequel, Fantasy Life i: The Girl Who Steals Time, was released in 2025.

== Plot ==
The game is set in the fantasy world of Reveria, which is made of the plains and mountains that center and surround the three lands of Castele, Port Puerto, and Al Maajik. Its rulers, King Erik of Castele, Olivia of Port Puerto, and Damien of Al Maajik spend their days ruling over their citizens and guiding them in their choice of the 12 available Life paths. One day this peaceful state is shattered when a strange purple meteorite falls into the house of the player, setting off a chain of events foretold in an ancient prophecy involving Reveria's goddess and the moon Lunares.

The player is asked by King Erik of the land of Castele to investigate these strange occurrences, as the meteorites, later dubbed Doomstones by the world's inhabitants, have the ability to fill creatures with dark, destructive energy. They are joined in this quest by a glowing butterfly that has the ability to speak. As the game progresses, the butterfly reveals that her real name and form is Yuelia, the daughter of Celestia, whom the people of Reveria worship as the Life Goddess.

They soon discover that the Doomstones are chunks of a dome that surrounds Reveria that has been slowly falling apart. This had happened in the past once before, but was stopped by Celestia, at the cost of her never being able to return to Lunares. Yuelia and her sister Noelia discover that the only way to save the world is to gather the wishes of as many people as possible and take them up to Lunares, where those wishes will restore the dome completely. The player and the two sisters manage to successfully travel to Lunares, but soon find out that they do not have enough wishes to restore the dome. Yuelia, becoming content with her Life on Reveria, wishes that she never has to leave. With that final wish, the end of the world is averted and Reveria is saved once again, ending the main story.

== Gameplay ==
Fantasy Life is a role-playing life simulation game, in which players can choose from any of the twelve jobs known as "life classes". Gameplay centers upon the player taking on various tasks given to them and switching between the twelve Life classes to access different tasks. Upon achieving various goals such as completing tasks in the game, buying a new house, or decorating said house, players will gain "Bliss points" that will unlock additional features like larger storage, or the ability to expand their home. Players are able to customize several aspects of their character.

As the game progresses players have the ability to unlock several new areas, as well as non-playable characters that can join them on their journey and help them fight monsters.

Players choose from one of twelve classes, each of which has its own "Life Master" that will assign tasks and award points to the player, allowing them to rank up within their Life. Each rank gives the player the ability to perform additional tasks and will give Life bonuses (additional vital stat points and abilities) to the player. As the player masters each Life class they gain the ability to more easily produce and access materials on their own, as opposed to purchasing them via a storefront. Players can level up through the ranks of each life class; starting out as a Fledgling and ending with the Legend rank. If the player has the Origin Island DLC, a new rank called the Creator (or God in Europe) rank is added.

== Reception ==
Reception

Aggregate score
Aggregator	Score
Metacritic	73/100

Review scores
Publication	Score
Destructoid	8/10
Eurogamer	6/10
Famitsu	35/40
Game Informer	6/10
GameRevolution	8/10
GameSpot	6/10
GameZone	9/10
IGN	7/10
Polygon	5.5/10
RPGamer	3/5
USgamer	4.5/5
Digital Spy	3/5
Metro	5/10

The game received "mixed or average reviews" according to the review aggregation website Metacritic. In Japan, Famitsu gave it a score of three nines and one eight for a total of 35 out of 40.

Megan Sullivan of IGN said that it "is a fun blend of life simulation and RPG" and that it "offers a cornucopia of activities to do." Conversely, Polygon's Griffin McElroy said that it is "more mundane than fantastic." McElroy criticized the game's battling mechanics, saying that they "require almost no strategy" and that "even the game's toughest foes can be easily outwitted; every enemy has an invisible boundary they'll never move past, so defeating any enemy is as easy as hitting them, running to the boundary and repeating."

Jeuxvideo.com's Kaaraj praised the game's cutscenes, but criticized the game for only having a few of them.

The game's story was criticized by several reviewers, with McElroy saying that it might be its "most repetitive element", IGN's Sullivan claiming that it "has pacing issues", and Destructoid's Brittany Vincent noting that "the beginning of the game is riddled with JRPG narrative tropes"; however, Eurogamer's Simon Parkin praised the game's story, calling it "witty". USgamer's Jeremy Parish noted several similarities between Fantasy Life's story and the story of Dragon Quest IX.

Chad Sapieha of National Post gave it 7.5 out of 10 and said that it "appeals to the dad in me because it teaches kids that work can be fun. It encourages kids to think that jobs – even real ones like tailoring and carpentry – are like a game." However, Liam Martin of Digital Spy gave it three stars out of five, saying that "despite its flaws, there is a lot of fun to be had in Fantasy Life. The job system is extensive and mastering each skill compulsive, while decorating apartments provides a nice break from the repetitive missions." Roger Hargreaves of Metro gave it five out of ten and called it "A fun mix of influences and career paths, but the game doesn't make being a mercenary or magician entertaining enough – let alone a tailor or woodcutter." Jed Pressgrove of Slant Magazine gave it one-and-a-half stars out of five, saying, "Some will try to excuse this nonsense by claiming the game is for kids, but this cynical explanation implies we live in an age where we should lie to everyone, including our children, about what 'adventure' entails."

In April 2013, Level-5 revealed that the game had sold over 300,000 units in Japan.

== Sequels ==
Fantasy Life Link!, an enhanced version, was released in Japan on July 25, 2013. New features include online play with friends, a rise in level cap, additional quests, and the ability to take screenshots, among others. The international version of Fantasy Life included the content of Link!, with the exception of the Origin Island DLC.

In April 2015, Level-5 revealed Fantasy Life 2: Two Moons and the Village of God, originally set for release on Android and iOS devices in 2016. The game was later renamed Fantasy Life Online, and suffered numerous delays over a period of three years, which pushed its release back to July 23, 2018, where it garnered over two million downloads in Japan within two weeks.

Fantasy Life Online was released in the west by Boltrend Games, a closed beta test that began on October 28, 2021, which ran until November 5, and was released on December 7. Service in Japan was discontinued on December 15. The western service for the game was discontinued on February 6, 2023.
