= Akihiro Hino =

Japanese video game designer

- 日野 晃博
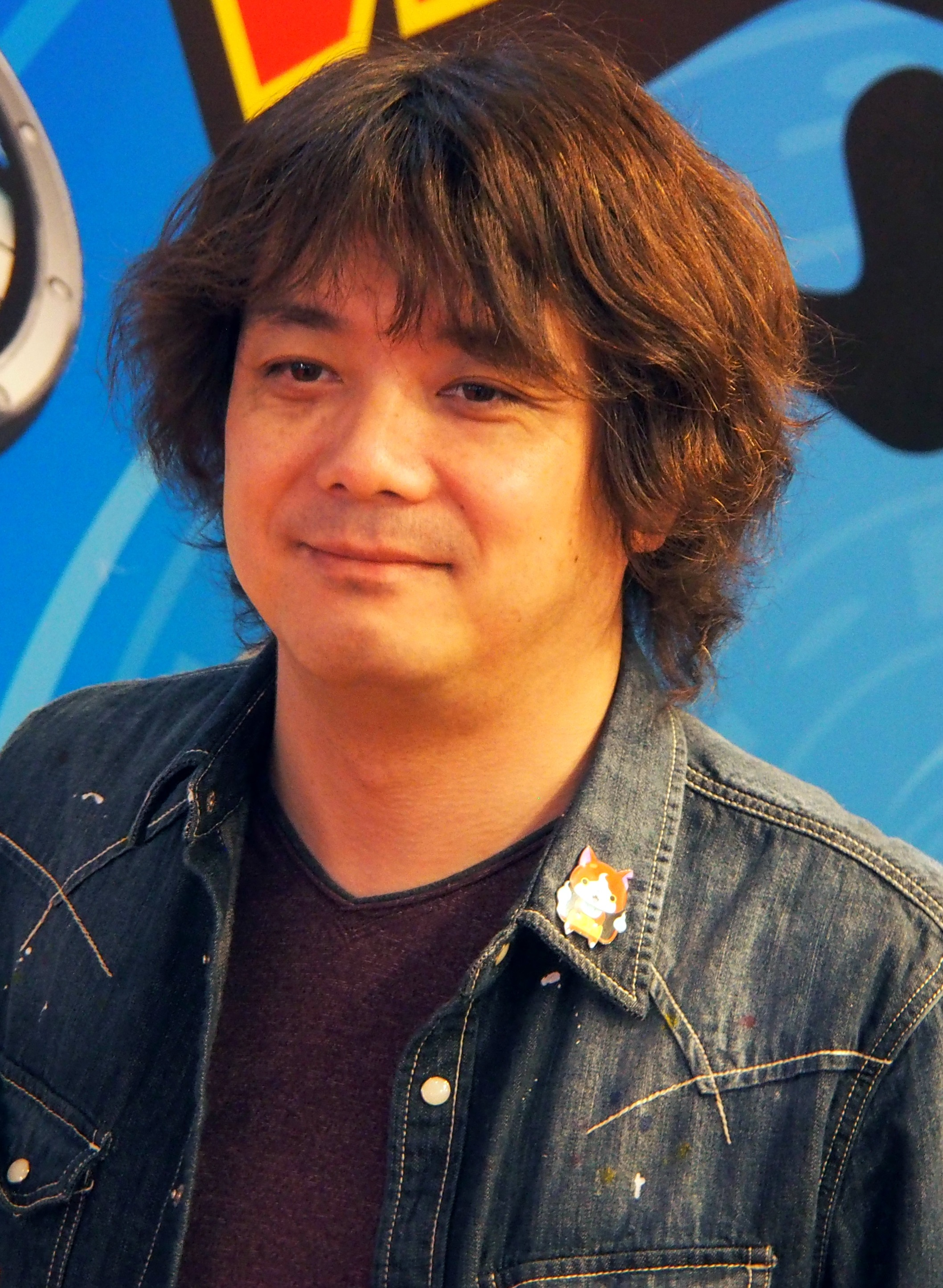
- Hino in 2015
- Born: July 20, 1968 (age 58); Ōmuta, Fukuoka, Japan
- Occupations: Game designer; Game producer; Scriptwriter
- Years active: 1989–present
- Known for: Dark Cloud series; Professor Layton series; Inazuma Eleven series; Ni no Kuni series; Yo-kai Watch series
- Title: President and CEO, Level-5

Akihiro Hino (日野 晃博, Hino Akihiro; born July 20, 1968) is a Japanese video game designer, producer, scriptwriter, and businessman. He is the founder, president, and chief executive officer of Level-5. Hino has held multiple roles in game development, including programming, scenario writing, directing, and executive production.

== Biography ==
=== Early life and education ===
Akihiro Hino was born in Ōmuta, Fukuoka Prefecture. Hino credited titles like Dragon Quest III as formative experiences that shaped his understanding of video games as a medium capable of emotional storytelling. He also developed an early interest in three-dimensional graphics, which influenced his later work at a time when most Japanese games were two-dimensional.

=== Early career ===
Hino began his professional career in the late 1980s at Riverhillsoft, a now-defunct Japanese developer. He contributed as a programmer to several early titles, including Doctor Hauzer, before serving as lead programmer on OverBlood (1996). He was promoted to lead designer and director for its sequel, OverBlood 2 (1998), marking his first major leadership position.

=== Founding Level‑5 ===
In October 1998, Hino founded Level‑5 in Fukuoka with a small team of collaborators. Level‑5’s first major release was Dark Cloud (2000) for the PlayStation 2, combining action role-playing gameplay with town-building mechanics. This was followed by Dark Chronicle and Rogue Galaxy, with Hino serving in roles spanning game design, scenario writing, and production.

=== Major works and collaborations ===
Hino directed Dragon Quest VIII (2004) in collaboration with Square Enix. He later led Level‑5’s collaboration on Dragon Quest IX.

In the late 2000s, Hino oversaw original franchises including Professor Layton and the Curious Village, which launched the globally successful Professor Layton series on the Nintendo DS and later expanded into films and spin-offs. He also directed Inazuma Eleven, a football-themed role-playing series that expanded into anime and merchandising. Hino contributed creatively to Ni no Kuni: Wrath of the White Witch in collaboration with Studio Ghibli and oversaw the launch of Yo-kai Watch (2013), which became a cultural phenomenon in Japan.

As president and CEO of Level‑5, he was appointed Principal (head supervisor) of the Top Game Creators Academy (TGCA), a professional development program launched by the Computer Entertainment Supplier's Association (CESA) to cultivate the next generation of game developers.

In 2014, Hino received the Minister of Economy, Trade and Industry Award at the Japan Game Awards for his contributions to Japanese interactive entertainment, recognizing his work in creating cross-media franchises that have influenced both domestic and international audiences.

=== Works ===
Year	Title	Roles
1989	Burai: Jōkan	Programmer
1991	Tōdō Ryūnosuke Tantei Nikki: Ōgon no Rashinban	Main Programmer
1992	Prince of Persia (FM Towns)	Programmer
1994	Doctor Hauzer	Main Programmer
1995	The Doraemons: Yūjō Densetsu	Main Programmer
1996	OverBlood	Lead Programmer
1998	OverBlood 2	Director, Game Design, Story
2000	Dark Cloud	Producer, Game Designer, Story
2002	Dark Chronicle	Producer, Game Designer, Story
2004	Dragon Quest VIII	Director
2006	Jeanne d'Arc	Producer, Game Designer
2007	Professor Layton and the Curious Village	Producer, Designer, Story
2007	Professor Layton and the Diabolical Box	Producer, Designer, Story
2008	Professor Layton and the Unwound Future	Producer, Designer, Story
2008	Inazuma Eleven	Producer, Designer, Story
2009	Professor Layton and the Last Specter	Producer, Designer, Story
2009	Inazuma Eleven 2	Producer, Designer, Story
2009	Dragon Quest IX	Director
2010	White Knight Chronicles: International Edition	Director, Producer, Designer, Story
2010	Inazuma Eleven 3	Producer, Designer
2011	Ni no Kuni: Wrath of the White Witch	Executive Producer, Story
2011	Inazuma Eleven Strikers	Producer, Designer
2011	Professor Layton and the Miracle Mask	Producer, Designer, Story
2012	LBX: Little Battlers eXperience	Producer, Designer, Story
2012	Time Travelers	Producer
2012	Mobile Suit Gundam AGE	Producer, Designer, Story
2012	Layton Brothers: Mystery Room	Producer
2012	Professor Layton vs. Phoenix Wright: Ace Attorney	Story
2012	Inazuma Eleven GO Strikers 2013	Producer
2012	Fantasy Life	Producer
2013	Professor Layton and the Azran Legacy	Producer
2013	Yo-kai Watch	Producer, Designer, Story
2014	Wonder Flick	Director, Producer
2014	Yo-kai Watch 2	Producer, Designer, Story
2015	Yo-kai Watch Blasters	Producer
2016	Yo-kai Watch 3	Producer, Story
2017	Layton's Mystery Journey: Katrielle and the Millionaires' Conspiracy	General Director, Designer, Story
2017	Snack World: Trejarers	General Director, Designer, Story
2018	Ni no Kuni II: Revenant Kingdom	General Director, Story
2018	Snack World: The Dungeon Crawl - Gold	General Director, Designer, Story
2019	Yo-kai Watch 4	Producer, Story
2025	Fantasy Life i: The Girl Who Steals Time	Producer, Executive Producer
