= J.B. Harold Murder Club =

1986 video game

- TurboGrafx-CD release
- Developers: Riverhillsoft; Althi (DS, Switch)
- Publishers: Riverhillsoft (PC-98); Micro Cabin (MSX); Kyodai (MS-DOS); Hudson Soft (TG16CD); FonFun (DS); SETA Corporation (FC)
- Platforms: Famicom, Fujitsu FM-7, FM Towns, NEC PC-88, NEC PC-98, MSX, Sharp X1, X68000, MS-DOS, TurboGrafx-CD, Windows, Nintendo DS, iOS, Nintendo Switch
- Release: NEC PC-88: JP: August 1986; NEC PC-98: JP: 1986; FM-7: JP: 1986; X1: JP: 1986; MSX: JP: 1988; X68000: JP: 1988; Famicom: JP: June 30, 1989; MS-DOS: NA: 1989; TurboGrafx-CD: JP: 1990; NA: 1991; Windows: JP: 1996; Nintendo DS: JP: February 21, 2008; iOS; February 15, 2011; Switch: JP: August 10, 2017
- Genre: Adventure
- Mode: Single-player

J.B. Harold Murder Club, known as J.B. Harold no Jikenbo #1: Murder Club in Japan, and as Murder Club in North America (MS-DOS), is a 1986 murder mystery adventure game, developed by Riverhillsoft and released for the NEC PC-98, MSX, MS-DOS, NEC TurboGrafx-CD (TurboDuo), and Nintendo DS. The TurboGrafx-CD version includes still photographs, text and audio voices as well as the option to select the language, English or Japanese. The game sold 200,000 copies. It is the first entry in the J.B. Harold series, which have been released on various platforms.

== Plot ==
A horrible murder has taken place in the sleepy little town of Liberty. Bill Robbins, a wealthy man known for his wild womanizing ways is the victim and the list of possible suspects keeps growing. As J.B. Harold the player must figure out the who, what, where and why of the case. To solve the mystery it will be necessary to travel to various locations, interview people and search for clues. The game is laid out over a grid map that displays various locations, though other than that, the game is mainly presented in the form of still photos.

== Reception ==
Dennis Owens (in the voice of a character named "Rocco") reviewed the MS-DOS version for Computer Gaming World, and stated that "Da goods on dis game iz dat, if youse can fuhgit dat dis iz nuttin' but a compudah game, which da game in no ways lets youse fugit, den youse might finds its to be sum kind o' complex moidah mystery."

=== TurboGrafx-CD ===
The game was reviewed in 1991 in Dragon #176 by Hartley, Patricia and Kirk Lesser in "The Role of Computers" column. The reviewers gave the game 4 out of 5 stars. They wrote that it is "a great game for mystery fans" and "a thinking game that is well worth the money". Dragon criticized the game for not including "a warning on the box about the mature subject matter in this game" in reference to an unsolved rape case.

Video Games and Computer Entertainment critic, Donn Nauert, praised the game's sound, graphics, and playability, giving it an overall score of 9 out of 10. Commenting on the game's unsolved rape, Nauert wrote: "I don't think this is a subject that the American public is comfortable with in a video game, even though it's not dealt with graphically..." Defunct Games stated: "This is the type of game that will no doubt appeal to the gamers who love a good murder mystery, and while it's not perfect there's no denying that it's the best game of its kind. This is the type of game you don't see much anymore, which is a real shame because for what it is J.B Harold is a lot of fun". They gave the game a score of 70%.

The PC Engine version was rated 21.74 out of 30 by PC Engine Fan magazine.

GameSpot included the game in its list of titles that deserve an enhanced remake, stating that it was "one of the most difficult games ever made", had "some of the most memorable voice acting of all time", and that "to this day there isn't much out there quite like it". They compared it to more recent titles such as the adventure games Shenmue (1999) and Shadow of Memories (2001) as well as the role-playing video game Star Wars: Knights of the Old Republic (2003), saying that it similarly features "character interaction as the major gameplay element" and has "a similar type of multiple phrase response".

== Legacy ==
J.B. Harold Murder Club is the first in the Japanese J. B. Harold series of murder mystery graphic adventure games, which includes Manhattan Requiem (1987), Kiss of Murder (1988), D.C. Connection (1989), and Blue Chicago Blues (1995). J.B Harold Murder Club was the first title in the series to be released in the United States. After the series sold 200,000 copies, an iOS version of the second game Manhattan Requiem was released in the Western world.

In 2008, an enhanced remake of the game was released for the Japanese Nintendo DS, under the title Keiji J.B. Harold no Jikenbo: Satsujin Club.
