= Dragon Quest IX =

2009 video game

Dragon Quest IX: Sentinels of the Starry Skies
- North American cover art
- Developers: Level-5; Square Enix
- Publishers: JP: Square Enix; WW: Nintendo
- Directors: Akihiro Hino; Jin Fujisawa
- Producer: Ryutaro Ichimura
- Designer: Yuji Horii
- Artists: Akira Toriyama; Eiichirō Nakatsu
- Writers: Yuji Horii; Masahiro Kataoka; Atsushi Narita
- Composer: Koichi Sugiyama
- Series: Dragon Quest
- Platform: Nintendo DS
- Release: JP: July 11, 2009; NA: July 11, 2010; EU: July 23, 2010; AU: August 19, 2010
- Genre: Role-playing
- Modes: Single-player, multiplayer

Dragon Quest IX: Sentinels of the Starry Skies (Note: Known in Japan as Dragon Quest IX: Hoshizora no Mamoribito, lit. "Dragon Quest IX: Guardian of the Starry Sky" (Japanese: ドラゴンクエストIX 星空の守り人).) is a 2009 role-playing video game developed by Level-5 and Square Enix for the Nintendo DS. Published by Square Enix in Japan in July 2009 and by Nintendo overseas the following year, it is the ninth mainline entry in the Dragon Quest series. The storyline follows the protagonist, a member of the angelic Celestrian race, after a disaster in their home scatters magical fruits across the mortal realm. While carrying over traditional gameplay from the rest of the series with turn-based battles, the game is the first Dragon Quest entry to feature a customizable player character, and the first to include a multiplayer mode, with the option of trading treasure maps and loaning player characters through Nintendo Wi-Fi. Online functions ended in 2014 when it ceased operations.

Development began in 2005, with Level-5's Akihiro Hino both acting as co-director and encouraging the game's development for the DS. Series creator Yuji Horii acted as game and story designer, with artist Akira Toriyama and composer Koichi Sugiyama also returning from previous entries. While an early prototype used an action-based combat system, negative fan feedback and internal testing prompted a return to the turn-based gameplay of earlier entries. Due to the focus on multiplayer, the games narrative and gameplay were designed around these features. Some of the game design drew inspiration from The Elder Scrolls IV: Oblivion and Diablo.

Announced in 2006 with a planned release the following year, the game was delayed by two years, with the final delay to allow bug fixes. These delays prompted Square Enix to cut its profit forecasts. Localization was handled by PlusAlpha and Shloc, who had previously localized Dragon Quest VIII. Upon release in Japan, the game posted strong sales, and with over five million copies sold worldwide by 2011 was the best-selling entry in the series until the multiplatform Dragon Quest XI (2017). Reviews in both Japan and the West were generally positive, with most of the praise being directed towards its gameplay design and graphics. Several critics felt that its traditional design restricted or undermined its other elements. Hugely popular in Japan, the game's anonymous communication mode would inspire the Nintendo 3DS's in-built SpotPass and StreetPass.

== Gameplay ==
A battle in Dragon Quest IX: the player's party engages a monster, triggering a damage multiplier with consecutive attacks.

Dragon Quest IX: Sentinels of the Starry Skies is a role-playing video game set in a fantasy world; the player takes on the role of a customizable player character of the Celestrian people trapped in the mortal world. The display is split between the two screens of the Nintendo DS; the top screen displays the map area and the player's location on it together with party status, while the bottom screen shows the immediate environment and main menu display. The in-game environment is displayed from an overhead isometric perspective, with both the environment and character models being displayed with 3D graphics. In addition to the main story quests, the player can pick up optional side-quests from non-player characters (NPCs) found through the world, with some being standalone and others being related chains of quests. Multiple quests can be taken on and completed at once, and can vary in content from errand tasks to defeating specific monsters. The player can use an alchemy pot to synthesise equipment, items, and weapons using ingredients gathered by foraging or finding them in treasure chests or getting them as drops from defeated monsters. Saving can only be performed at a church in town.

As with all previous mainline Dragon Quest games, Dragon Quest IX uses a traditional turn-based battle system, though enemies are displayed as roaming sprites rather than previously established random encounters. Coming into contact with an enemy sprite during exploration triggers a battle in a combat arena themed after the current location, and depending on the party's level an enemy may give chase or run away. In addition to the protagonist, the player needs to create the remaining three members. The party is restricted to four including the protagonist, with a further eight able to be held in reserve. All party members can be individually controlled or act automatically based on preset commands managed in the battle menu. The player can attack, defend, use an item, use skills dubbed Abilities, perform magic which draws on a magic resource called MP, trigger a special action called a Coup de Grâce, or attempt to escape. Consecutive normal attacks trigger a damage multiplier which remains until the sequence is broken by an enemy or a non-attack skill.

A core part of organizing the player party is assigning character classes called Vocations. The player character starts by default as a Minstrel, with access to defensive, offensive, and supportive skills, and they can later branch into other Vocations, including Warrior, Thief, and Priest. Vocations are permanently assigned to other characters, with the protagonist able to change Vocations at an in-game location after a certain point in the narrative. By using Vocations, the player can learn skills exclusive to each one. Changing Vocation resets the character's experience level to one and removes all learned spells, with skill point abilities purchased by the player along with unspent skill points being carried over, but switching back to a class restores that character's level and spells. At the end of battle, the party is awarded experience points which raise a character's level, skill points to raise specific character statistics, and gold to spend at shops in towns. If the party falls in battle, they are returned to their last save and lose half the gold they hold.

In addition to single-player gameplay, Dragon Quest IX incorporates multiplayer. Up to three designated players can connect locally, with the one who initiated the session acting as host. The party can travel together, or the four can split up and act independently. Guest party members cannot progress the narrative, but are allowed to keep any items, experience points, and gold they acquire. Guests are not restricted by level, allowing a party composition of any level to take part in quests at different parts of the story. After completing a story quest early in the game, the player could engage in a form of passive online interaction dubbed Tag Mode. While the DS is in sleep mode, it can interact with other nearby systems with the game installed, allowing up to three characters to be imported into the game bringing a gift, ranging from items and equipment to treasure maps leading to caves that can hold treasure or dungeons to explore. The online functions were not region locked, allowing trading between systems in Japan, North America, and Europe. While much of the text went untranslated, map titles were automatically translated into the DS system's native language. The online elements lasted until 2014, when the Nintendo Wi-Fi service was shut down.

== Synopsis ==
In the world of Dragon Quest IX, an angelic race known as Celestrians act as guardians of the Protectorate, the realm of mortals. The purpose of aiding and protecting them is to collect the mortals' spiritual energy known as benevolessence and feed it to the World Tree Yggdrasil, located in the Celestrians' Observatory. Once fed the appropriate amount, Yggdrasil produces a fruit called Fyggs that summons a magical train dubbed the Starflight Express allowing the Celestrians to enter the Realm of the Almighty. The protagonist is a Celestrian assigned to the human village of Angel Falls under the stewardship of Aquila, gathering the last piece of benevolessence to grow the Fyggs. As they board the Starflight Express, a malevolent force attacks from below, sending the Fyggs, the protagonist, and Starflight Express down to the Protectorate. The protagonist awakens as a mortal but is still able to see Celestrians and the spirits of the dead, and is on a mission to help Angel Falls discover the broken-down Starflight Express and its fairy engineer, Stella. Stella promises to help the protagonist return to the Observatory if they can prove they are a Celestrian by gathering benevolessence. Convincing Stella of their identity, the protagonist receives a vision inspiring them to explore the Protectorate and recover the scattered Fyggs.

The protagonist's quest for the Fyggs reveals they have indiscriminate wish-granting properties, with many mortals who use or eat them driven into madness. The protagonist also faces opposition from the Gittish Empire, an evil organization thought to have been wiped out three centuries ago. Aquila appears to be aiding the Gittish Empire but is later revealed as a double agent who returns the Fyggs to the Observatory after taking them from the protagonist. Traveling to the Realm of the Almighty with the reinvigorated Starflight Express, the protagonist learns that Yggdrasil is the form of the goddess Celestria, who defended the Protectorate from her father the Almighty Zenus, with the Observatory and Celestrians being created to observe and judge the Protectorate.

In a final battle with the Gittish Empire's King Godwyn, Aquila sacrifices himself to destroy Godwyn, asking the protagonist to save the captured Celestrian Corvus. Once freed, Corvus attacks the protagonist, vowing to destroy the Protectorate and leaves. The protagonist and Stella learn that Corvus fell in love with the human woman Serena, but mistakenly now believes she betrayed him when Serena's father led the original Gittish Empire to him. Becoming embittered and delusional, he revived the Gittish Empire as twisted monsters and used them to attack Yggdrasil. The protagonist pursues a nihilistic Corvus to the now-corrupted Realm of the Almighty and faces him as a mortal after eating one of the Fyggs, as Celestrians physically cannot defy their superiors.

Once defeated, Corvus is comforted by Serena's spirit who reveals the truth - after he was injured defending her town from the Gittish Empire, Serena hid him in a cave to recover, as the empire was hunting him. When he refused to rest, she fed him a potion purported to heal his injuries, which instead immobilised him. Unbeknownst to her, her father led the Gittish Empire to the cave under the promise they would leave the town be; instead, they killed Serana and her father and took an unconscious Corvus, leading to his hatred of mankind and her spirit wandering the world in search of him. The two pass on as the Realm of the Almighty returns to normal, and the protagonist learns that as they are mortal they are now trapped in the Protectorate, unable to see Celestrians or travel with Stella. In the epilogue chapter, the protagonist can find another Fygg and use it to restore their ability to see the Celestrians and travel with Stella on the Starflight Express once more.

== Development ==
Dragon Quest IX was co-developed by Square Enix and Level-5, the company which had developed Dragon Quest VIII (2004). As with earlier Dragon Quest titles, production was overseen by Armor Project, a studio founded by series creator Yuji Horii to supervise the series since the original game. Horii acted as game designer and wrote the storyline. The event planner was Masahiro Kataoka, while the scenario script was written by a team led by Atsushi Narita. Akihiro Hino from Level-5 acted as co-director. The director from Square Enix was Jin Fujisawa, with the game becoming his directorial debut after working as part of the series scenario staff under Horii since the late 1990s. The producer was Ryutaro Ichimura.

Concept work for a new mainline Dragon Quest game began after development wrapped up on Dragon Quest VIII, with Horii and the rest of the series staff deciding what platform the next mainline entry should be developed for, with Horii wanting to reach as wide an audience as possible. Hino later noted that he suggested the DS as the platform from an early stage, inspired by its widespread commercial success; Level-5 was already working with the DS developing Professor Layton and the Curious Village. After some hesitation about having a mainline entry on a portable platform, Horii was convinced. Production began in 2005, with Horii keeping its production as secret as possible. During production it went by the codename "Xenlon", named by Ichimura during a conversation in a store called Xenlon Tokyo.

Horii later described the platform as a great choice for Dragon Quest due to its portability and multiplayer options. He called the Wi-fi functionality of the console the final deciding factor. He briefly considered making it a gaiden with the next mainline entry coming later, but ultimately chose to commit to making a mainline entry for the DS. While Horii had anticipated a quick development due to working on a portable console, he later admitted it had taken far longer than he anticipated. A challenge for the team was working within the DS hardware, as with each previous Dragon Quest they had worked with increasing hardware specs from console to console.

=== Design ===
Horii described the theme of the narrative as "growth", represented principally by the lead character and how they grew through completing the smaller story arcs. In a different interview he said "independence" was the theme in both the lead character and its supporting cast. When describing the game design's impact on the story, Horii stated that the team aimed for the player to become the protagonist of the story more than in earlier entries, and due to this there was no traditional party with their own story arcs. This led to the introduction of Stella as a means of communicating the story and creating interaction. Stella was intended as a beautiful yet "devilish" companion contrasting against the wise yet ugly King Trode of Dragon Quest VIII. Commenting on the Christian elements in the story such as the angel-like Celestrials, Horii called them a light-hearted inclusion to add flavor to the world.

Dragon Quest IX was the first in the series to include a multiplayer mode and a customisable protagonist. The game's design was intended to create something which would be playable for a long time, and encourage people to keep hold of it rather than sell it on the second-hand market. Horii also wanted players to create their own stories when they had finished the main story quest. The team also increased the overall difficulty, strengthening normal enemies and bosses, to encourage player cooperation through sharing information on the internet. Multiplayer proved challenging for the team to develop as they wanted to incorporate it into the main scenario, as opposed to a separate mode which would have been simpler to develop. The Tag Mode was present in the early design proposals, but map exchanging was a later addition to the mode. Due to the amount of freedom given to players and content within the game, the save data was so large that the team could only provide one save slot. This single slot caused the staff some worries, as they were afraid of problems caused by constant overwriting and there being no backup for players.

During early stages and with its original trailer, Dragon Quest IX broke with series tradition and used an action-based combat system to fit into the multiplayer design. This design approach was first proposed by Hino. Horii explained that this was a prototype design, and after first showing it off it drew heated criticism from series fans and prompted arguments online. Paired with Horii finding that turn-based gameplay still worked and was enjoyable in multiplayer, and that prolonged action combat became "monotonous", the battle system was switched back to the standard turn-based design. The sprite-based monster encounters were taken from the spin-off Dragon Quest Monsters: Joker so players had more control over when they got into battle. The quest system was designed with short play sessions in mind. Ichimura elaborated that the quest system drew inspiration from The Elder Scrolls IV: Oblivion, while Diablo was used as a reference on keeping players engaged for long periods.

Akira Toriyama, who had worked on the series since the original game, returned as the lead artist, creating the character designs with Eiichirō Nakatsu. Toriyama was surprised at the choice of platform as he had little interest designing for it, but working on a Dragon Quest for the platform was invigorating for him. A notable element was the customizable avatar, with the number of aesthetic and armor options being a means to help diversify characters and make them stand out within the multiplayer and online elements. Another notable element was the switch to 3D graphics, which Horii attributed to the work of Level-5 who had been long working with 3D graphics. The opening and in-game full-motion cutscenes were created by animation studio Kamikaze Douga.

=== Music ===
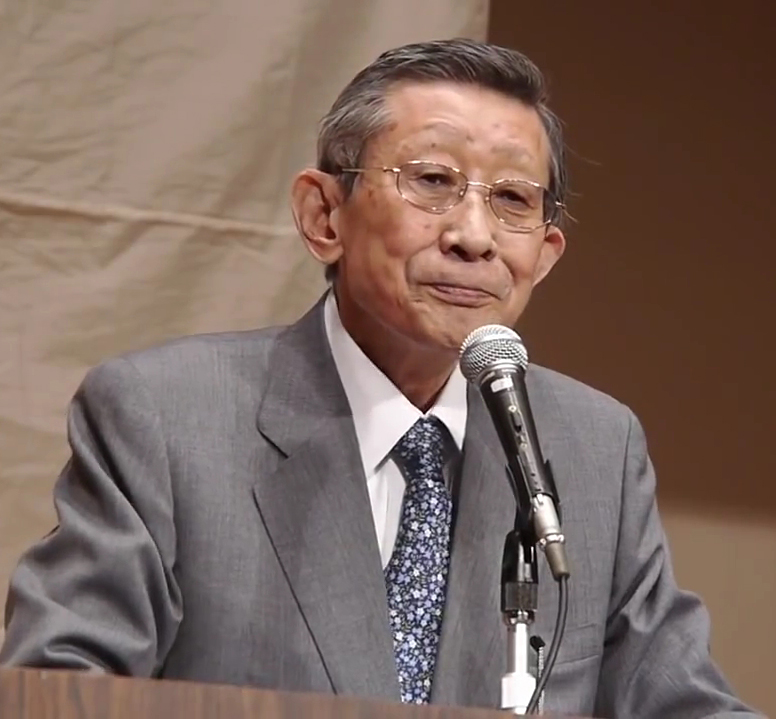
Koichi Sugiyama (pictured 2011) returned as composer for Dragon Quest IX.

As with other Dragon Quest titles, the music was composed by Koichi Sugiyama. As with their earlier collaborations, Horii put together a list of scenes with themes he wanted to accompany them and gave it to Sugiyama. For Dragon Quest IX, he also specifically requested music with an "angelic" atmosphere due to the planned story. Despite his advancing age and long association with the series, Sugiyama felt eager to work on Dragon Quest IX as he felt his age was not impacting his ability to write music. Sugiyama used a Roland JV-2080, Proteus/2, and KORG M1 to create the score before it was converted into MIDI form for the game. He was prepared for composing for the DS sound environment due to his work on the DS remake of Dragon Quest V. The battle themes went through a process of trial and error, with his initial version boring Horii during test plays. The introductory segment of the Overture, the series' main theme since the first game, was frequently rewritten. For the music which played during a key early cutscene, Sugiyama wrote the score to synch with on-screen events, such as a harp playing when light shone from above.

The first theme created by Sugiyama was intended as a field exploration theme, but when Horii heard it and assumed it to be a town theme, Sugiyama tested it and found it was better suited to be such. Recalling his favorites, he stated a liking for sombre songs and highlighted the themes "Guide Them to Their Fate" and "Heaven's Prayer". For the latter, he initially only used one choral element, but after listening on the test ROM and realising the amount of time players would spend in the Celestial realm where it played, he increased it to three choruses. "Heaven's Prayer" shared its melody with the opening notes of the Overture, with Sugiyama consequently calling it an "important song". He described himself as "debugger" for the game along with his role as composer, remembering having taken on additional work when his suggestions for extra themes for areas were approved by the team.

A two-disc soundtrack album was released by King Records on August 5, 2010. Sugiyama supervised the soundtrack creation. Music from the game was featured in a series concert by the Tokyo Metropolitan Symphony Orchestra conducted by Sugiyama, timed to coincide with the soundtrack album's release. A symphonic soundtrack for Dragon Quest IX was released by King Records on February 10, 2010. The music was performed by the Tokyo Metropolitan Symphony Orchestra conducted by Sugiyama, with Tatsuya Yabe as concertmaster.

== Release ==
A new mainline entry in the Dragon Quest series was confirmed by Sugiyama in a post-concert interview in August 2006. The game, along with its name and platform, were announced in November of that year. Its platform was noted as a return to Nintendo consoles after several years on the PlayStation console family. Its subtitle in the region was translated as Defenders of the Starry Sky. Ichimura wanted Dragon Quest IX to reach the widest audience possible and expand both the game's commercial success and the series fandom. This prompted development of the children-oriented Dragon Quest: Monster Battle Road, though a game link with Dragon Quest IX was ultimately scrapped, and a wide popular advertising campaign to bring both children and women to the series. Originally planned for release in 2007, the game was initially delayed until the following year so the developers to make a better product. It was delayed a second time in October 2008 into early the following year without explanation.

The game was scheduled for release in March 2009, but when undergoing the testing process, several serious bugs were discovered made more difficult to resolve due to the multiplayer features, forcing Square Enix to further delay the release to July 11 of that year. Due to being pushed into the following fiscal year, Square Enix cut its projected profits for the 2008-2009 year. Then-CEO Yoichi Wada issued a public apology, blaming the earlier scheduled release on his "arrogance" and lack of knowledge about bug testing. In anticipation of its release, Square Enix sent out extensive promotional displays to stores in Japan, doing a special collaborative launch event with the Shibuya branch of Japanese retailer Tsutaya. On launch day there were long queues around game stores from the early morning onwards. Five guidebooks for the game were published alternately by Shueisha and Square Enix between the game's release date and July 2010. A gag manga anthology was released by Square Enix on December 22, 2009.

Speaking in August 2009, Square Enix initially stated that they were "considering" a release outside Japan and at that time evaluating which regions to release in. According to a later interview, Horii confirmed they were designing the game with a Western release in mind, meaning few changes were needed between regions. A Western release was confirmed in February 2010. The English subtitle, in addition to other European language translations, was revealed through trademarks registered in December 2009. The localization was handled by PlusAlpha Translations and Schloc, who had previously localized Dragon Quest VIII and remakes of earlier titles. Speaking on the process of translation and localization, Will Blatchley noted that due to the lack of voice acting, they toned down some of the less-recognisable accents compared to their earlier work, though the established Cockney was retained. The term glossary for Dragon Quest IX was the largest the team had handled up to that point, with most of the naming following group-based themes around its puns. Localizing the Tag Mode messages accurately between the various languages within the DS's space limitations was a major challenge. Horii travelled to Nintendo World Store in North America as part of a pre-launch event. In all Western regions, the game was published in 2010 by Nintendo; it released on July 11 in North America, on July 23 in Europe, and on August 19 in Australia.

== Reception ==
Reception

Aggregate scores
Aggregator	Score
GameRankings	87.98% recommend
Metacritic	87/100

Review scores
Publication	Score
1Up.com	A
Eurogamer	9/10
Famitsu	40/40
Game Informer	8/10
GameSpot	8/10
GameTrailers	8.5/10
IGN	8/10; 7.5/10 (AU)
Official Nintendo Magazine	90%

Dragon Quest IX saw "generally favorable" reception according to review aggregator website Metacritic, recording a score of 87 out of 100 based on 67 reviews, and being the best-rated DS title of 2010. It earned multiple perfect scores, including 1Up.com, and Japanese gaming magazine Famitsu; Dragon Quest IX was the first Dragon Quest, and the tenth video game overall, to earn a perfect score from Famitsu. At the 2010 National Academy of Video Game Trade Reviewers awards, Dragon Quest IX was nominated in the "Original Light Mix Score, Franchise" and "Game Sequel RPG" categories. At the 14th Annual Interactive Achievement Awards (now known as the D.I.C.E. Awards), Dragon Quest IX was nominated for "Portable Game of the Year" and "Role-Playing/Massively Multiplayer Game of the Year".

The Famitsu reviewers, who delayed their review so they could properly test the multiplayer, gave general praise to the mechanics, visuals and music, summing it up as "an RPG that people from truly any generation can enjoy." Jeremy Parish, writing for 1Up.com, called Dragon Quest IX one of the deepest and most engaging portable RPGs produced, with his only complaints being around its story and the lack of true online multiplayer. Simon Parkin of Eurogamer called the game a perfect product of the various companies and individuals involved in production, lauding it as a refreshingly straightforward game compared to other games from either Square Enix or within the RPG genre. Game Informer's Phil Kollar lauded the exploration and combat as engaging and enjoyable, but felt the multiplayer fell short of the promises made prior to release due to the lack of true online play.

GameSpot's Bethany Massimilla noted the necessity for grinding to ensure the player party could progress through the story and disliked the menu system, but otherwise enjoyed its story, gameplay and side content. GameTrailers noted the lack of innovation in its core gameplay structure, but felt the multiplayer elements broadened the style and number of activities enough that it was enjoyable rather than dated. Ryan Clements of IGN was pleased with his time on the game, citing exploration for quests and equipment and the multiplayer as some of its best features, but found the overall experience traditional to the detriment of other mechanics. In a notably less positive review for the Australian IGN outlet, Daniel Staines did note features which alleviated the amount of grinding required of players, but noted the traditional approach taken by the game served to undermine its strengths, additionally noting a lack of players to join in with the multiplayer sections. Official Nintendo Magazine's Simon Bramble called Dragon Quest IX "one of the grandest adventures you'll ever play" despite the deceptive tone set by the visuals.

The battle and class systems met with much praise for their polish and depth of customization, (Note: 1Up.com, Eurogamer, Famitsu, Game Informer, GameSpot, GameTrailers, IGN, Official Nintendo Magazine.) though alongside their praise several reviewers felt the battle system was too traditional or cumbersome due to its menu-based interface. The traditional story was praised for its pacing and length, but others felt that the game's overall focus on multiplayer was detrimental to the narrative. Both Kollar and Parkin noted the story's themes and visual language as befitting the Christian symbolism used in earlier entries. The 3D graphics met with praise, with several comparing them positively to Dragon Quest VIII and finding them impressive for the DS hardware. When mentioned, the music also met with positive responses though there was some disappointment in its synthesised nature and low number of tracks. The multiplayer was seen as a positive addition to the game despite its impacts on the narrative, with many citing it as an innovative and engaging system.

=== Sales ===
During its debut week in Japan, Dragon Quest IX sold 2.32 million units during its first two days on sale, reaching the top of Media Create's gaming charts; its release also prompted a boost in sales of the DS console in contrast to other consoles which had seen recent declining sales. By November 2009, the game had sold four million copies in Japan; in a breakdown of sales, Ichimura said around two million buyers were current fans, 1.4 million were older fans, and around 600,000 were series newcomers. Sales of Dragon Quest IX in Japan, paired with worldwide sales of titles including Final Fantasy XIII, contributed to Square Enix posting record profits for the fiscal year ending March 2010.

In North America, Dragon Quest IX was the eighth best-selling game of July 2010 in the NPD Group charts, with 132,000 units sold. In the United Kingdom, it was the highest-selling new release in its first week, and remained in the top ten best-selling games in the region into the following month. During Nintendo's fiscal year ending 2010, Dragon Quest IX sold over one million copies in the United States and Europe, becoming the eighth best-selling DS title for that period. By the end of 2010, the game had sold 5.3 million copies worldwide, making it the best-selling entry in the series until the multiplatform release of Dragon Quest XI in 2017.

=== Impact and legacy ===
Dragon Quest IX became a cultural phenomenon in Japan due to its online elements, with gatherings occurring where players swapped treasure maps in search of rare items. Features on GamesIndustry.biz and USGamer noted its innovative multiplayer and online design. Nintendo producer Hideki Konno, speaking in an interview with Satoru Iwata on the development of the Nintendo 3DS, cited the Tag Mode as inspiration for the development of the console's SpotPass and StreetPass feature. Speaking in 2018 and 2019 on the possibility of a remake for other platforms, different staff members described the multiplayer functions embedded in the game as a bottleneck, but hoped that a port or remake could be developed with a new version of Tag Mode.
