= Riverhillsoft =

Japanese video game company

- Logo from 1996 to 2004
- Industry: Video games
- Founded: August 1982
- Defunct: June 2004
- Fate: Bankruptcy
- Successor: Althi, Inc.
- Headquarters: Fukuoka Prefecture, Japan
- Products: J.B. Harold series

Riverhillsoft (リバーヒルソフト, Ribāhiru Sofuto) was a Japanese video game manufacturer in operation from 1982 to 2004. The studio focused in the 1980s developing games for Japanese home computers, in the 1990s shifted to console game development, and in the 2000s to mobile games. They also published Western games in the Japanese market.

== History ==
The company was initially known for the successful J.B. Harold Murder Club series of murder mystery adventure games, developed from 1986 onwards. They were initially released as computer games and later ported to the PC Engine CD console, Nintendo Family Computer, Nintendo DS handheld, and iOS mobile.

Riverhillsoft also published Prince of Persia in Japan. Their ports to the Japanese NEC PC-9801 and PC Engine CD platforms featured improved graphics (introducing the Prince's classic "turban and vest" appearance) and a new Red Book audio soundtrack. They also ported it to other computers and video game consoles, helping the game become a worldwide success.

Riverhillsoft were later known for several early survival horror games. These include the 1994 game Doctor Hauzer and the first game in the OverBlood series. Their final release was the life simulation game World Neverland: Waneba Island for the PlayStation in 2000.

Following layoffs in 2000, the company turned its focus on mobile gaming, which proved unsuccessful. In June 2004, it filed for bankruptcy and the majority of its employees left to form a new company, called Althi, Inc., absorbing Riverhillsoft.

== Games ==
List of games developed by Insomniac Games
| Year | Title | Platform(s) |
|---|---|---|
| 1983 | Zoom in Space | PC-88 |
| 1984 | Lizard | PC-88, PC-98 |
| 1985 | Space Adventure: Zodiac | PC-88, FM-7 |
| 1986 | Aggres | PC-88, PC-98, FM-7 |
| 1986 | J.B. Harold no Jikenbo #1: Murder Club | PC-88, PC-98, FM-7, X1, MZ, X68000, MSX, Famicom, MS-DOS, PC Engine, FM Towns, Windows |
| 1987 | J.B. Harold no Jikenbo #2: Manhattan Requiem | PC-88, PC-98, FM-7, X1, X68000, MSX, LaserActive |
| 1987 | J.B. Harold no Jikenbo: Kiss of Murder | PC-88, PC-98, FM-7, X1, X68000, MSX, Windows |
| 1988 | Tōdō Ryūnosuke Tantei Nikki: Kohakuiro no Yuigon | PC-88, PC-98, FM-7, X68000, MSX, PC Engine, Windows |
| 1989 | J.B. Harold 3: D.C. Connection | PC-88, PC-98, MSX, Windows |
| 1989 | Burai: Jōkan | PC-88, PC-98, FM Towns, MSX |
| 1990 | Tōdō Ryūnosuke Tantei Nikki: Ōgon no Rashinban | PC-98, FM Towns, X68000, Windows |
| 1990 | Sōkoban | Game Gear |
| 1990 | Burai: Gekan - Kanketsu-hen | PC-98, FM Towns, MSX |
| 1991 | Burai: Hachigyoku no Yūshi Densetsu | PC Engine, Mega-CD, Super Famicom |
| 1991 | Prince of Persia | PC Engine, FM Towns |
| 1991 | Kigen: Kagayaki no Hasha | PC-98, FM Towns |
| 1992 | Buster Ball | Game Gear |
| 1992 | Top o Nerae! GunBuster Vol.1 | PC Engine CD |
| 1992 | Princess Minerva | PC-98, PC Engine CD, Super Famicom |
| 1992 | Burai II: Yami Kōtei no Gyakushū | PC Engine CD |
| 1993 | Top o Nerae! GunBuster Vol.2 | PC Engine CD |
| 1993 | Kidō Keisatsu Patlabor: Griffon-hen | PC Engine CD |
| 1993 | Faceball 2000 | PC Engine CD, Game Gear |
| 1994 | J.B. Harold: Blue Chicago Blues | LaserActive, Windows, Classic Mac OS, Saturn, 3DO, PlayStation, PC-FX |
| 1994 | Doctor Hauzer | 3DO |
| 1994 | Insecter War | 3DO |
| 1994 | Graduation | PC Engine CD, Saturn, PlayStation |
| 1995 | Bomberman: Panic Bomber | PC-98, FM Towns, X68000 |
| 1996 | Casablanca ni Ai o: Satsujinsha wa Jikū o Koete | Windows |
| 1996 | Hyper 3D Taisen Battle: Gebockers | Saturn |
| 1996 | OverBlood | PlayStation |
| 1996 | Densetsu no Ogre Battle | Saturn |
| 1996 | Tactics Ogre | Saturn |
| 1997 | Private Eye | Windows |
| 1997 | Refrain Love: Anata ni Aitai | PlayStation, Saturn |
| 1997 | Santa Fe Mysteries: The Elk Moon Murder | Windows |
| 1997 | Santa Fe Mysteries: Sacred Ground | Windows |
| 1997 | World Neverland: The Olerud Kingdom Stories | PlayStation, Dreamcast |
| 1998 | Klaymen Klaymen: Neverhood no Nazo | PlayStation |
| 1998 | OverBlood 2 | PlayStation |
| 1998 | Klaymen Klaymen 2: Skullmonkey no Gyakushū | PlayStation |
| 1999 | Refrain Love 2 | PlayStation |
| 1999 | World Neverland 2: The Waktic Republic of Pluto | PlayStation, Dreamcast |
| 1999 | Abe '99 | PlayStation |
| 1999 | Klaymen Gun Hockey | PlayStation |
| 1999 | Vermilion Desert | Dreamcast |
| 2000 | World Neverland: Waneba Island | PlayStation |
| Cancelled | World Neverland 3 | PlayStation 2 |

== See also ==
- Arsys Software
- Cing
- Level-5
