= Level-5 (company) =

Japanese video game developer

Level-5 Inc.
- Logo used since 2006

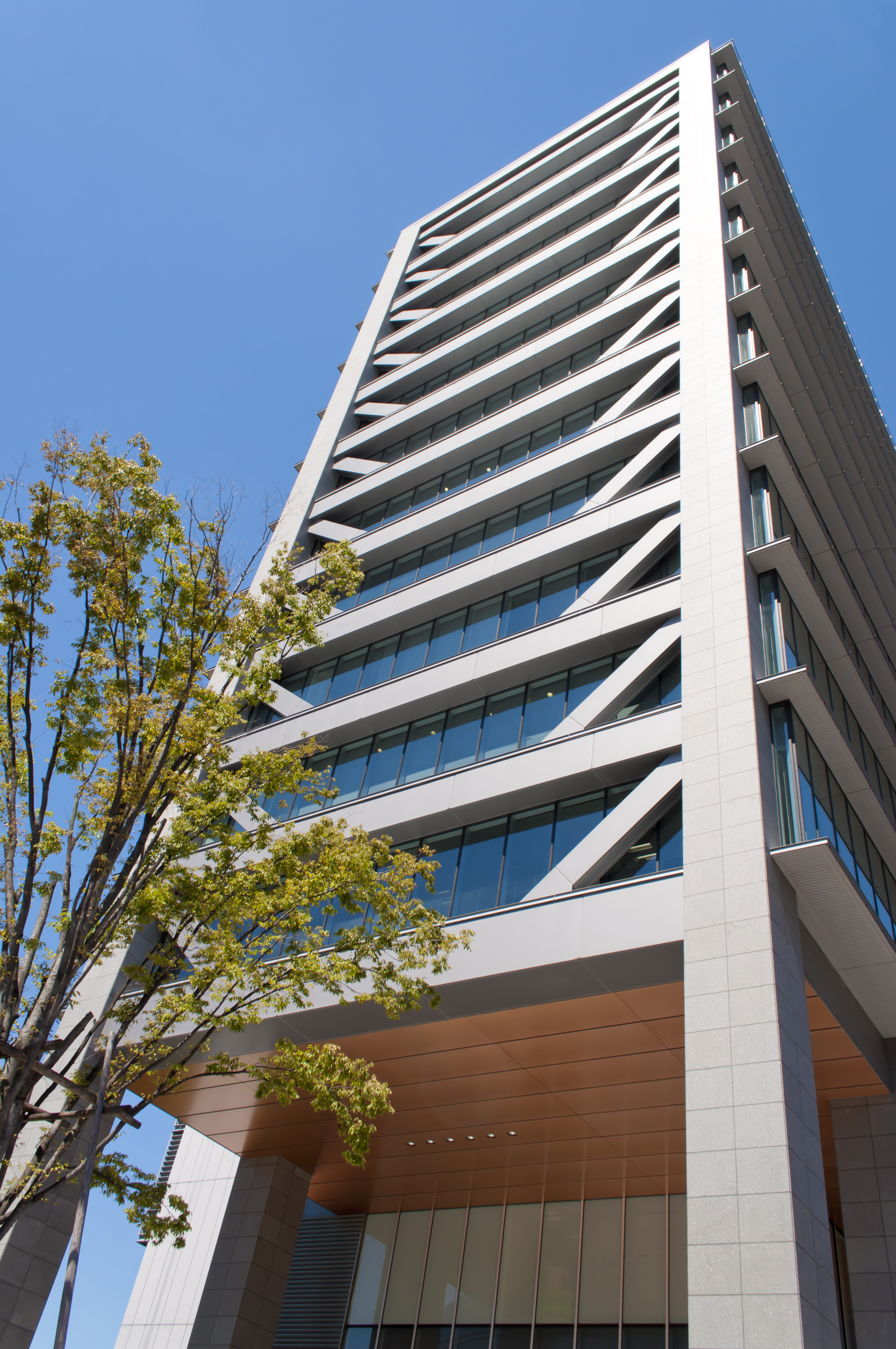
- Headquarters in Chūō-ku, Fukuoka
- Native name: 株式会社レベルファイブ
- Romanized name: Kabushiki gaisha reberu faibu
- Type: Private
- Industry: Video games
- Founded: October 28, 1998; 28 years ago
- Headquarters: Yakuin, Chūō-ku, Fukuoka, Fukuoka Prefecture, Japan
- Key people: Akihiro Hino; (President; CEO)
- Products: Dark Cloud; Professor Layton; Inazuma Eleven; Ni no Kuni; Yo-kai Watch; Snack World
- Number of employees: Approx. 320 (2026)
- Divisions: Level-5 Osaka Office
- Subsidiaries: Freestyle Work
- Website: www.level5.co.jp

Level-5 Inc. (Note: Japanese: 株式会社レベルファイブ, Hepburn: Kabushiki gaisha Reberu Faibu) is a Japanese video game developer and publisher based in Fukuoka. The company was founded in October 1998 by Akihiro Hino after he departed from Riverhillsoft. Level-5 is known for its Professor Layton, Inazuma Eleven, Ni no Kuni, Yo-kai Watch, Snack World, and Megaton Musashi franchises.

== History ==
Level-5 was established in October 1998 by Akihiro Hino and his development team at Riverhillsoft, following the release of OverBlood 2. Since Hino did not originally believe that his team could become an independent developer, he formed a partnership with Sony Computer Entertainment, who would allow him to develop for its upcoming PlayStation 2 under the condition that he set up his own company. The name, "Level-5", was a reference to Japanese school report cards, where "Level-5" is the highest possible mark. Soon after being created, the company had eleven employees.

Level-5's first full-scale production was the action role-playing game Dark Cloud, developed under contract by Sony Computer Entertainment. Intended to be a launch game for the Japanese release of the PlayStation 2, it was delayed before the console's launch in March 2000 to allow further development, eventually being released in Japan in December 2000, and worldwide in 2001. Work immediately began on a sequel titled Dark Chronicle, released as Dark Cloud 2 in North America. The company was working with Microsoft Game Studios on an MMORPG for the Xbox, True Fantasy Live Online, before it was cancelled in 2004.

Yasumi Matsuno, director of Vagrant Story, Final Fantasy Tactics, and the Ogre Battle series, briefly joined Level-5 in June 2011, and left the company after completing work on Crimson Shroud for the Nintendo 3DS. By the early 2010s, Level-5 was one of the ten largest video game companies in Japan, holding a market share of 3.2%. In October 2015, Level-5 founded a spin-off company in Santa Monica, in cooperation with Dentsu, called Level-5 Abby. In October 2020, it was reported that the company's North American operations, including Level-5 Abby, were shutting down due to low sales. The same month, Level 5 launched a manga publishing platform called "Manga 5".

=== Roid service ===
In 2009, Level-5 launched its Roid (Revolutionary Original Ideas Discovery) service, a mobile phone application that serves as a content delivery platform for mobile games. It is only compatible with NTT DoCoMo's i-mode mobile internet service in Japan. Users pay a monthly fee for access to exclusive games and social game functions. The platform debuted with six games: Paul Sloane and Des MacHale's Mystery Story, Professor Layton and the Mansion of the Mirror of Death Remix, Chara Jo P, Yuuenchi wo Tsukurō Revolution, Treasure Island, and Elf the Dragon. The first three were developed by Level-5, while the last three were developed by outside companies.

=== Use of generative AI ===
In December 2023, Level-5 revealed that they have been using generative AI programs such as Stable Diffusion to assist game development and promotion. In December 2025, amidst online polemic sparked by comments from Larian CEO Swen Vincke on the use of generative AI for the early phases of development of the studio's upcoming title, and subsequent controversy over its use for placeholder textures during the development of Sandfall's Clair Obscur: Expedition 33, CEO Akihiro Hino defended the use of generative AI. He asserted the technology would lead to "greater growth" for the sector, claimed its use is widespread and often unpublicized across the gaming industry, while also dismissing reports genAI is being used by the company to write 80% or more of the code in its games.

In September 2026, after Level-5's online showcase for their upcoming games, fans criticized the company's alleged use of generative AI, especially in the different art style in the trailer for Yo-kai Watch 2: Haunted Domain between their direct and the previous day's Nintendo Direct. In response, Level-5 claimed that several of their games, such as Yo-kai Watch 2: Haunted Domain and Professor Layton and The New World of Steam, did not use any generative AI.

== List of games ==
All games were developed and/or published by Level-5 unless otherwise noted

Year	Game	Original platform(s)	Ref.
2000	Dark Cloud (Note: Published by Sony Computer Entertainment)	PlayStation 2	
2002	Dark Chronicle	PlayStation 2	
2004	Dragon Quest VIII (Note: Published by Square Enix)	PlayStation 2	
2005	Rogue Galaxy	PlayStation 2	
2006	Jeanne d'Arc	PlayStation Portable	
2007	Professor Layton and the Curious Village	Nintendo DS	
2007	Professor Layton and the Diabolical Box	Nintendo DS	
2008	Inazuma Eleven	Nintendo DS	
2008	Professor Layton and the Unwound Future	Nintendo DS	
2008	White Knight Chronicles	PlayStation 3	
2009	Paul Sloane & Des MacHale's Intriguing Tales	Nintendo DS	
2009	Professor Tago's Mental Gymnastics #1 and #2	Nintendo DS	
2009	Dragon Quest IX	Nintendo DS	
2009	Paul Sloane & Des MacHale's Intriguing Tales 2	Nintendo DS	
2009	Inazuma Eleven 2	Nintendo DS	
2009	Professor Tago's Mental Gymnastics #3 and #4	Nintendo DS	
2009	Professor Layton and the Last Specter	Nintendo DS	
2010	Inazuma Eleven 3	Nintendo DS	
2010	White Knight Chronicles II	PlayStation 3	
2010	Ni no Kuni: Dominion of the Dark Djinn	Nintendo DS	
2010	Ni no Kuni: Hotroit Stories	Mobile phone	
2011	Professor Layton and the Miracle Mask	Nintendo 3DS	
2011	Danball Senki	PlayStation Portable	
2011	Inazuma Eleven Strikers	Wii	
2011	Ni no Kuni: Wrath of the White Witch	PlayStation 3	
2011	Little Battlers eXperience Boost	PlayStation Portable	
2011	Inazuma Eleven GO	Nintendo 3DS	
2011	Inazuma Eleven Strikers 2012 Xtreme	Wii	
2012	Girls RPG: Cinderellife	Nintendo 3DS	
2012	Ni no Kuni: Daibouken Monsters	Mobile phone	
2012	Guild01	Nintendo 3DS	
2012	Little Battlers eXperience	Nintendo 3DS	
2012	Time Travelers	Nintendo 3DS, PlayStation Portable, PlayStation Vita	
2012	Mobile Suit Gundam AGE Universe Accel/Cosmic Drive (Note: Published by Bandai Namco Games)	PlayStation Portable	
2012	Layton Brothers: Mystery Room	Android, iOS	
2012	Little Battlers eXperience W	PlayStation Portable, PlayStation Vita	
2012	Professor Layton and the Phantom Thieves	Android, iOS	
2012	Professor Layton vs. Phoenix Wright: Ace Attorney	Nintendo 3DS	
2012	Inazuma Eleven GO 2: Chrono Stone	Nintendo 3DS	
2012	Inazuma Eleven GO Strikers 2013	Wii	
2012	Fantasy Life	Nintendo 3DS	
2013	Professor Layton and the Azran Legacy	Nintendo 3DS	
2013	Liberation Maiden	iOS	
2013	Guild02	Nintendo 3DS	
2013	Earth Devastating B-Grade Girlfriend Z: Space War	Android, iOS	
2013	Yo-kai Watch	Nintendo 3DS	
2013	Little Battlers eXperience W: Super Custom	Nintendo 3DS	
2013	Fantasy Life Link!	Nintendo 3DS	
2013	Little Battlers eXperience: Wars	Nintendo 3DS	
2013	Inazuma Eleven GO 3: Galaxy	Nintendo 3DS	
2013	Attack of the Friday Monsters! A Tokyo Tale	Nintendo 3DS	
2014	Weapon Shop de Omasse	Nintendo 3DS	
2014	Yo-kai Watch 2	Nintendo 3DS	
2015	Yo-kai Watch Blasters	Nintendo 3DS	
2015	Yo-kai Watch: Wibble Wobble (Note: Co-developed by NHN PlayArt)	Android, iOS	
2015	Yo-kai Watch Dance: Just Dance Special Version (Note: Co-developed with Ubisoft Paris, Ubisoft Reflections, Ubisoft Montpellier, Ubisoft Bucharest, Ubisoft Milan and Ubisoft Pune)	Wii U	
2016	Yo-kai Sangokushi (Note: Developed by Koei Tecmo)	Nintendo 3DS	
2016	Yo-kai Watch 3	Nintendo 3DS	
2017	Inazuma Eleven: Everyday+	Android, iOS	
2017	Layton's Mystery Journey	Android, iOS, Nintendo 3DS	
2017	Snack World: Trejarers	Nintendo 3DS	
2017	Otome Yusha (Note: Developed by h.a.n.d.)	Android, iOS	
2017	Yo-kai Watch Busters 2 (Note: Developed by Digital Works Entertainment)	Nintendo 3DS	
2018	Yo-kai Sangokushi: Kunitori Wars	Android, iOS	
2018	Ni no Kuni II: Revenant Kingdom	Windows, PlayStation 4	
2018	Snack World: The Dungeon Crawl – Gold	Nintendo Switch	
2018	Yo-kai Watch: Gerapo Rhythm	Android, iOS	
2018	Yo-kai Watch World (Note: Developed by GungHo Online Entertainment)	Android, iOS	
2018	Fantasy Life Online	Android, iOS	
2019	Yo-kai Watch 1	Nintendo Switch, Android, iOS	
2019	Yo-kai Watch 4	Nintendo Switch, PlayStation 4	
2020	Yo-kai Watch Jam: Yo-kai Academy Y	Nintendo Switch, PlayStation 4	
2021	Ni no Kuni: Cross Worlds (Note: Developed by Netmarble)	Android, iOS	
2021	Megaton Musashi	Nintendo Switch, PlayStation 4	
2022	Megaton Musashi Cross	Nintendo Switch, PlayStation 4	
2024	Megaton Musashi W: Wired	Nintendo Switch, PlayStation 4, PlayStation 5, Windows	
2025	Fantasy Life i: The Girl Who Steals Time	Nintendo Switch, Nintendo Switch 2, PlayStation 4, PlayStation 5, Windows, Xbox Series X/S, Android, iOS	
2025	Inazuma Eleven: Victory Road	Nintendo Switch, Nintendo Switch 2, PlayStation 4, PlayStation 5, Windows, Xbox Series X/S	
2026	Inazuma Eleven Cross	Android, iOS	
2026	Professor Layton and the New World of Steam	Nintendo Switch, Nintendo Switch 2, PlayStation 5, Windows	
2026	Inazuma Eleven RE	Nintendo Switch, Nintendo Switch 2, PlayStation 5, Windows	
2026	Pufflings: Journey Through a Fantasy World	Android, iOS	
2027	DecaPolice	Nintendo Switch 2, PlayStation 5, Windows	
2027	Snack World: Reloaded	Nintendo Switch 2, PlayStation 5, Windows	
2027	Holy Horror Mansion	Nintendo Switch 2, PlayStation 5, Windows	
2027	Professor Layton and the Curious Village Remake	Nintendo Switch, Nintendo Switch 2, PlayStation 5, Windows	
TBA	Yo-kai Watch 2: Haunted Domain	Nintendo Switch 2, PlayStation 5, Windows	
TBA	Inazuma Eleven: Bold Revolution	TBA	
