= Professor Layton and the Azran Legacy =

2013 video game

- European box art
- Developer: Level-5
- Publishers: JP: Level-5; NA/PAL: Nintendo
- Directors: Usuke Kumagai; Jun Suzuki
- Producer: Akihiro Hino
- Composer: Tomohito Nishiura
- Series: Professor Layton
- Platform: Nintendo 3DS
- Release: JP: February 28, 2013; EU: November 8, 2013; AU: November 9, 2013; NA: February 28, 2014
- Genres: Puzzle, Adventure
- Mode: Single-player

Professor Layton and the Azran Legacy (Note: Known in Japan as Reiton-kyōju to Chō-Bunmei Ē no Isan (レイトン教授と超文明Aの遺産; Professor Layton and the legacy of super civilization A)) is a puzzle game developed by Level-5 for the Nintendo 3DS. It is the sixth entry in the Professor Layton series, making up the third and final part of the prequel trilogy of games and, according to Level-5 CEO Akihiro Hino, it was intended to be the last Layton title to star Professor Layton himself as the protagonist. However, with the announcement of Professor Layton and The New World of Steam in 2023, this is no longer the case. The game saw a release in early to late 2013 in all territories except North America, where it was released on February 28 of the following year.

In a departure from the previous entries, Azran Legacy is an around the world adventure that sees Professor Layton and company journey to multiple locations both in and outside of England, in an attempt to uncover the truth behind the ancient elder race civilization, the Azran.

== Story ==
One year after the events of the previous entry, Professor Layton and the Miracle Mask, Layton, Luke, and Emmy are invited by Professor Desmond Sycamore, an eminent archaeologist who affirms that he discovered a so-called living "mummy". Boarding the airship Bostonius, piloted by Raymond, Sycamore's butler, the trio rendezvous with Sycamore in the city of Froenborg where they help him free Aurora, a girl trapped in ice since ancient times with no memory of her past, when she is kidnapped by Targent's leader Leon Bronev. With help from Sycamore, Layton and Luke rescue Aurora from Targent's airship and the group escort her to some Azran ruins where she reveals the location of five Azran eggs, scattered around the world which are necessary to unlock the Azran Legacy.

Layton and the others return to London to prepare for their journey in search for the eggs. In the occasion, they help the Scotland Yard solve the mystery of several archaeological artifacts stolen from a local museum and expose Detective Inspector Leonard Bloom as a mole from Targent. Once their preparations are over, the group travel around the globe and retrieve the eggs, with Aurora recovering part of her memories with each artifact secured. During their travels, the group helps a jungle chief regain his sense of humor, learn of a popular island tradition that one egg inspired, clear up a misunderstanding about a wolf attacking a desert, stop a hillside from "sacrificing" women to prevent whirlwinds, and cure people in a walled city of a sleeping illness. After collecting all the eggs, Aurora discovers that one of them was previously stolen by Targent and replaced with a fake. Layton's team then goes to the Nest and infiltrates Targent's headquarters, where they confront Bronev and retrieve the last egg, using it in conjunction with the others to create a master key that can unlock the Azran Legacy. Aurora recovers her memories and tries to warn the others that the Azran Legacy is dangerous, but Sycamore reveals himself as Layton's arch enemy, Jean Descole in disguise and steals the key.

The group chases Descole to the cave where they first met Aurora, where Layton and Descole are ambushed by Bronev. Emmy reveals herself as a double spy working for Bronev, being the reason why she followed Layton, and betrays him. Bronev heads inside the ruins, taking Aurora and the key with him. Layton and Descole chase after Bronev and in the occasion, Descole reveals himself as Layton's older brother, whose original name was Hershel, but passed on to his brother to help with his adoption into the Layton family, and that Bronev is their father, an archaeologist who was coerced to work for Targent at first, but later assumed control of the organization and is currently obsessed with nothing but to unlock the Azran secrets after his wife's death. Descole also reveals that all of his actions were part of his plan to enact revenge on Targent for destroying their family.

At the heart of the ruins, Layton catches up with Bronev, who apparently sacrifices Aurora, piercing through her heart, to unlock the Azran Legacy, releasing thousands of golems that start destroying everything around them. Aurora reveals that the golems were created by the Azrans to serve them, but once they developed conscience, they rebelled against their masters, destroying the Azran civilization. In a final effort, the Azrans sealed the golems inside the ruins, leaving Aurora, who is the last of the golems, as an emissary to test mankind's worth, and due to Bronev's actions, the Azran ruins decided that mankind must be destroyed. Layton, Luke, Emmy, Descole and Bronev sacrifice themselves to stop the device that powers up the golems. Moved by their gesture, Aurora pleas for their recovery to the Azran ruins, which they attend, but causing the ruins to self-destruct. With her mission fulfilled, Aurora bids farewell to Layton and co. who escape the ruins while she perishes inside them, while Descole takes the opportunity to flee.

Once in safety, Bronev is arrested by Inspector Grosky for his crimes. Before being taken into custody, Bronev reveals that Layton's true name is Theodore Bronev. Layton denies this and wishes to keep his adoptive name, refusing to recognize Bronev as his father, but he hopes that they can meet again as friends and fellow archaeologists one day. Descole is last seen flying away with Raymond on a restored Bostonius, searching for a new purpose in life. Back in London, Emmy renounces her position as Layton's assistant, but promises to return when she proves herself worthy of it. The game ends with Luke and Layton driving in the countryside as they plan to solve an inheritance dispute at village of St. Mystere, setting up the plot for Professor Layton and the Curious Village.

== Gameplay ==
Similar to previous games, Professor Layton and the Azran Legacy is a puzzle game split into various chapters. The game follows Professor Layton and his friends as they explore various environments and solve many puzzles. The gameplay is the same as that of Professor Layton and the Miracle Mask. Players utilise the touch screen to navigate through locations, search the environment for clues or objects and solve puzzles. It is possible to zoom into certain areas with the magnifying glass, allowing to find more puzzles or objects. The game features over 500 new puzzles, more than its predecessor, in which there were 515. Hint coins can also be found and used to help the player solve a puzzle if they are stuck. Throughout the game, you can also unlock minigames which appear in the trunk including Nutty Roller, Dress Up and Bloom Burst. A major new feature in the gameplay involves travelling to different parts of the world using the Bostonius, Professor Sycamore's airship.

== Music ==
As with all previous entries in the series, the music in the game was composed by Tomohito Nishiura. "Surely Someday", performed by Miho Fukuhara, was used as the ending credits song. The Japanese version included the song with Japanese vocals, while it was replaced worldwide with an instrumental version.

== Reception ==
Reception

Aggregate scores
Aggregator	Score
Metacritic	81/100
OpenCritic	78% recommend

Review scores
Publication	Score
Adventure Gamers	4.5/5
Destructoid	7/10
Eurogamer	9/10
Famitsu	32/40
Game Informer	8.25/10
GameSpot	7/10
GamesRadar+	4/5
GamesTM	8/10
IGN	8.5/10
Nintendo Life	9/10
Nintendo World Report	8.5/10
Official Nintendo Magazine	85%

Professor Layton and the Azran Legacy received "generally favorable" reception, according to review aggregator Metacritic.
