= Professor Hershel Layton =

Fictional character from the Professor Layton series

- Professor Layton character
- Professor Hershel Layton as he appears in Professor Layton and the Miracle Mask.
- First appearance: Professor Layton and the Curious Village (2007)
- Created by: Akihiro Hino
- Voiced by: Christopher Robin Miller (English); Yo Oizumi (Japanese, video games); Kōichi Yamadera (Japanese, anime)

In-universe information
- Full name: Hershel Layton; Theodore Bronev (birth name)
- Occupation: Archaeology professor of the Gressenheller University
- Family: Roland Layton (adoptive father); Lucille Layton (adoptive mother); Jean Descole/Hershel Bronev (brother); Leon Bronev (biological father); Rachel Bronev (biological mother)
- Children: Katrielle Layton (adoptive daughter); Alfendi Layton (son)
- Origin: United Kingdom
- Nationality: British
- Apprentices: Emmy Altava (Prequel trilogy); Luke Triton (Prequel & Original trilogy); Flora Reinhold (Original trilogy)

Professor Hershel Layton (エルシャール・レイトン教授, Erushāru Reiton-kyōju) is the eponymous main protagonist of the Professor Layton series, created by Level-5, in which he and his apprentice Luke Triton investigate mysteries while solving various brain teasers. He also appears in an animated movie, Professor Layton and the Eternal Diva, and has featured in manga and novels that have not been released in English.

Professor Layton is based on the idea of an English gentleman, and is a professor of archaeology at the fictional Gressenheller University in London. He was designed by Level-5 CEO Akihiro Hino, who used Sherlock Holmes, Indiana Jones and fellow video game character Phoenix Wright as inspiration for his creation. He is voiced by Yo Oizumi in the original Japanese releases of the series, and by Christopher Robin Miller in English-language releases.

== Conception and design ==
Professor Layton was designed by Akihiro Hino, CEO of Level-5. When designing the game, he thought about what kind of character would make an "interesting lead". What came to mind was the concept of a famous detective and his assistant, in the manner of Sherlock Holmes. Hino is also a fan of the Indiana Jones films which inspired the Archaeologist aspect and the 1930s setting. From this idea, he created Professor Layton and his young apprentice, Luke Triton. The English setting of the games was also inspired by these mystery stories. Professor Layton was also derived in part from Phoenix Wright (from Capcom's Ace Attorney franchise). Hino examined what he believed to be Wright's good and bad points, and designed Layton by overcoming what he saw as Wright's bad points.

The idea to voice the characters, despite the idea being uncommon on the Nintendo DS at that time, came about as a means to attract casual players who had purchased Brain Age but were skeptical about playing other, more complex video games. Level-5 enlisted television personalities to voice characters from the game, such as Yo Oizumi being chosen to voice Professor Layton within Japan. For English-language releases in the series, Nintendo selected American voice actor Christopher Robin Miller. Both have reprised their roles for each successive game in the series as well as the animated movie, with Miller being the only cast member who reprises his role in the games' European releases.

== Appearances ==
=== Video games ===
About thirty years before the events of Professor Layton and the Azran Legacy, Theodore Bronev was born to Leon and Rachel Bronev and had an older brother named Hershel. When he was very young, a cultlike organisation named Targent kidnapped both of his parents for their knowledge of the Azran civilization, leaving Theodore and Hershel behind alone in the house. An elderly couple, Roland and Lucille Layton, came wishing to adopt the child named Hershel. Theodore's brother gave him his name and caused him to be adopted in his place. From then on, Theodore Bronev would be known as Hershel Layton. Then, eighteen years before the events of Professor Layton and the Miracle Mask, Hershel Layton is in high school and undergoes an archaeological expedition with his close friend, Randall Ascot. While the two explore the Akbadain ruins, they accidentally activate a trap, which leads to the presumed death of Randall. Years later during his years at college, he meets the love of his life, Claire. Claire gives Layton his top hat as a present just before he becomes a professor of archaeology at Gressenheller University, ten years before the events of Professor Layton and the Unwound/Lost Future. Immediately following this exchange, however, Claire is killed in an accident involving a time machine. Professor Layton's drive to be a gentleman, and willingness to solve puzzles, come from these two events.

=== Prequel trilogy ===
At the start of Professor Layton and the Last Specter, Professor Layton receives a letter from a friend of his, Clark Triton, who asks for help regarding a specter terrorizing his town of Misthallery at night. On the way to Misthallery, Professor Layton is stopped by Emmy Altava, an energetic and headstrong young woman who has just been hired as his assistant at Gressenheller University. She joins him, and the two proceed to Clark's house, where Clark's son, Luke, the one who actually wrote the letter, shows the ability to foretell attacks from the specter. Luke sneaks out of his house to assist Professor Layton, and the three of them investigate the specter. At one point, they visit Luke's friend Arianna Barde and her brother Tony, and police chief Levin Jakes, who threatens Layton to leave Misthallery. Just one year prior, Jakes was responsible for murdering Arianna and Tony's father Evan Barde, who pushes him off a cliff, killing him. As a result, Arianna isolates herself from everyone, including Luke. Eventually, they discover that the specter was an excavation machine created by Jean Descole, a masked scientist searching for various ruins (known as the "Azran Legacies") left by the ancient civilization of the Azran. In an attempt to stop Descole's attacks on the town, Loosha, the last of a race of prehistoric sea creatures, drains the lake at the top of Misthallery by destroying the town's dam, flooding the town and destroying the machines. Within the lake, Professor Layton finds the gate to the Golden Garden, the first of the Legacies, which makes him famous across the world. Following this, Luke Triton asks to become his apprentice; Layton obliges.

In Professor Layton and the Miracle Mask, Angela Ledore, an old high school friend of Layton's, calls Layton to the town of Monte d'Or to investigate the self-proclaimed Masked Gentleman who has been performing terrifying 'miracles' using the power of an artifact called the Mask of Chaos. Eventually, Layton deduces that the Masked Gentleman is Randall Ascot, his best friend from high school, who was presumed to have fallen to his death in the Akbadain ruins eighteen years prior but had actually survived (albeit with amnesia). Jean Descole soon appears, however, and reveals that the Akbadain ruins were the last of the Azran Legacies. Descole states he had planned for Professor Layton to solve the mystery of the Nautilus Chamber (Infinite Vault in the UK) of Akbadain, reviving the lost power source of the Azran Civilization.

In Professor Layton and the Azran Legacy, which concludes the prequel trilogy, another archaeologist named Desmond Sycamore calls Layton to the city of Froenborg. This time, he and his companions investigate a 'living mummy' who appears to be a girl named Aurora. Layton then races against a crooked archaeology organization called the Targent, led by his biological father Leon Bronev, in search of the key to the ancient Azran sanctuary. Towards the end of the game, Sycamore reveals himself to be the man under the image of Descole, which he reassumes when he betrays Layton. After Descole rescues Luke from danger and finds himself on the brink of life and death, he states that Leon Bronev is his and Layton's father, and Layton remembers that he is Descole's younger brother. Also, the human race is put in jeopardy when Bronev's uncompromising attitude unleashes an Azran golem horde that terrorizes Froenberg. However, Layton and his companions are able to stop the golems before any more damage is caused. As Bronev is apprehended by the police, he tells Layton that his given name is Theodore Bronev, but Layton refuses to accept this as his real name or recognize Bronev as his father. Nevertheless, he hopes to meet Bronev again one day as a friend and fellow archaeologist. Following Targent's dissolution, Emmy says goodbye to Layton, leaving Luke as his apprentice.

=== Original trilogy ===
In Professor Layton and the Curious Village, Layton and Luke are called by Lady Dahlia of St. Mystere to investigate the will of the deceased baron, who had mentioned an artifact named the Golden Apple for whom the bearer would be entitled his entire fortune. They slowly manage to unearth the truth about the strange village, but they find that the only person who can show them the apple is none other than the baron's daughter, Flora Reinhold, who had been hidden away in the village for years as part of the baron's plan to find someone smart and kind enough to take care of her. Layton obliges, and takes the girl under his wing, leaving St. Mystere.

In Professor Layton and the Diabolical Box, Layton and Luke take the Molentary Express in an effort to find out what was responsible for the temporary coma of his teacher, Dr. Andrew Schrader, who was found "dead" in his office with nothing but a train ticket without a destination, and the artifact he was investigating, the Elysian Box, missing. This was proven to have been taken by Don Paolo, earlier at the start of the game, before Dr. Schrader was found. The two of them, later joined by Flora, go to the towns of Dropstone and Folsense, eventually finding the true purpose of the Elysian Box and reuniting a long-broken family.

Finally, in Professor Layton and the Unwound Future, which wraps up the original trilogy, Layton and Luke attend a demonstration of a 'time machine', a failed experiment that leads to the disappearance of both the lead scientist Dimitri Allen and the prime minister, Bill Hawks. Ten years prior, Allen was responsible for the accidental death of Layton's fiancé Claire, who worked as the scientist's lab assistant. A week after the demonstration, Layton and Luke receive a letter purported to be from Luke himself, ten years into the future, in dire need of assistance, and they are asked to go to a clock shop on the edge of town. When they leave it, they find themselves in the future London. They meet with a woman who claims to be Claire's sister, Celeste, who is trying to piece together what actually happened to Claire. After Layton exposes his presumed evil future self as Dimitri Allen, he deduces that he and his friends never traveled through time but instead were transported to a duplicate of London built beneath the original city.

The future Luke then reveals himself as Clive, a wealthy young man who lost his parents in the same explosion that killed Claire and now wants to use his mechanical fortress to destroy the real London. With the help of Don Paolo (whom Layton explains was originally named Paul), Celeste, Inspector Chelmey, Luke, and Flora, Layton successfully deactivates the weapon and saves the real London from further destruction. As Clive is apprehended by the police, he thanks Layton for helping him snap out of his criminal insanity. Finally, Celeste reveals to Layton she is in fact his true love Claire, and that the lab accident ten years prior successfully sent her ten years into the future. Claire explains that despite Allen's best efforts to save her, her trip through time is temporary and that she will shortly return to the moment in which she was killed in the lab explosion. The two share a painful and sudden farewell. Layton comes to terms with this realization and, after Claire vanishes, takes off his hat for her out of respect. As the story comes to a close, Luke receives word that his family is moving away, and the game ends with Luke saying goodbye to Layton, hoping to remain good friends, followed by Layton receiving the game's final puzzle in the mail from Luke some time later.

=== In other video games ===
Several spin-off titles have been released for the series featuring the character, including social network game Professor Layton Royale and Nintendo 3DS title Professor Layton vs. Phoenix Wright: Ace Attorney. In the latter, Professor Layton teams up with Phoenix Wright from the Ace Attorney series to solve mysteries in Labyrinthia, a medieval town emphasizing "witch trials". Though Professor Layton does not appear in the iOS title Layton Brothers: Mystery Room, the game focuses on his son, Alfendi Layton, who is a renowned detective for Scotland Yard and works in the eponymous Mystery Room with his assistant Lucy Baker to solve crimes. In the seventh main title Layton's Mystery Journey, Professor Layton disappears under mysterious circumstances, prompting his daughter, Katrielle Layton, to go looking for him. Professor Layton will appear in Professor Layton and The New World of Steam.

=== In other media ===
Professor Layton is featured heavily in Professor Layton and the Eternal Diva, an animated movie based on the series that takes place between Last Specter and Miracle Mask. In Eternal Diva, Professor Layton goes to the fictional Crown Petone opera house and is tricked into solving puzzles in a contest to win an alleged Elixir of Eternal Life. Though the Elixir is proven to be a scheme by Jean Descole to unearth the second of the Azran Legacies, the lost kingdom of Ambrosia, Professor Layton is the one who ultimately unlocks the city by discovering and playing a Song of the Sun, along with two other harmonious melodies.

Aside from Eternal Diva, Professor Layton has also appeared in manga and in novels. The manga, Reiton-kyōju to Yukai na Jiken (レイトン教授とユカイな事件; Lit. "Professor Layton and the Cheerful Mystery"), is mainly directed toward children and features characters Luke and Flora trying to answer such mysteries as "what is under Professor Layton's hat"? Three volumes have been released, but none of them in English.

The three novels based on the series prominently feature Professor Layton, though, like the manga, they have not been released outside Japan. Reiton-kyōju to Samayoeru Shiro (レイトン教授とさまよえる城; Lit. "Professor Layton and the Wandering Castle") takes place during the original trilogy of games, in which Professor Layton and company try to solve the mystery of a floating castle believed to contain the people who had recently vanished from the city of London. The second and third books, Reiton-kyōju to Kaijin Goddo (レイトン教授と怪人ゴッド; Lit. "Professor Layton and the Phantom Deity") and Reiton-kyōju to Gen'ei no Mori (レイトン教授と幻影の森; Lit. "Professor Layton and the Illusory Forest"), take place during the prequel trilogy. Kaijin Goddo has Professor Layton investigating a series of art thefts performed by the eponymous "Phantom Deity"; Gen'ei no Mori has him exploring a strange village within the "Forest of Illusion" in search of his assistant, Emmy, who has been kidnapped.

Professor Layton appears in a few episodes of Layton Mystery Tanteisha: Katori no Nazotoki File, an animated series based on the game Layton's Mystery Journey. In these episodes it becomes clear why Professor Layton disappeared. He and an older Luke are locked up in some coma-like state, inside coffins from what they called the Relics Treasure: a device that serves as a door to the future. It is also revealed that Katrielle Layton is not the professor's biological daughter. Katrielle was born on a sinking ship and was rescued by Luke, who brought her to Professor Layton. The professor decided to adopt her.

== Reception and legacy ==
Nintendo Power said that Professor Layton was one of their favorite new characters during their 2008 award, with writer Justin Cheng saying that Curious Village's characters, especially Professor Layton and his apprentice Luke, were a reason why the game was so memorable and engaging. GameSpot has referred to him as the "Sherlock Holmes of puzzles", and said that his voice acting was "welcome and familiar". In 2012, GamesRadar ranked him as the 33rd best hero in video games, saying Layton proves "that there's more to being a hero than brute strength". GamesRadar further placed him at number 22 in a list of the 50 best game characters of the generation. UGO Networks placed Layton first on their list of "The Coolest Helmets and Headgear in Video Games". Similarly, Game Pro included him in a list of "The 17 Best Pieces of Headwear in Gaming", placing Layton 15th.

Since the release of Curious Village, Professor Layton has been compared with several new characters from later titles, including Henry Hatsworth (of EA Tiburon's Nintendo DS title Henry Hatsworth in the Puzzling Adventure) and Doctor Lautrec (of Konami's Nintendo 3DS title Doctor Lautrec and the Forgotten Knights). Noriaka Okimura, the person who designed Doctor Lautrec, stated that, while inspired by Layton, it was not his intention to make the two look alike; he felt it would be awkward for a 19th-century gentleman to not be wearing a hat like Layton's. Kyle Gray, creator of Henry Hatsworth, was more aggressive, stating that Henry Hatsworth is the man you'd call to "save the world from an impending collision with an alternate dimension", while Professor Layton is the sort of person to call "if you need someone to find your missing cat.".
