= Professor Layton and the New World of Steam =

Upcoming 2026 video game

- Developer: Level-5
- Publisher: Level-5
- Series: Professor Layton
- Platforms: Nintendo Switch; Nintendo Switch 2 PlayStation 5 Windows
- Release: December 10, 2026
- Genres: Puzzle, adventure
- Mode: Single-player

Professor Layton and the New World of Steam (Note: Known in Japan as Reiton-kyōju to Jōki no Shin Sekai (レイトン教授と蒸気の新世界)) is an upcoming puzzle-adventure game by Level-5. It is the eighth main game of the Professor Layton series, set one year after the events of Professor Layton and the Unwound Future. The game is scheduled to be released on December 10, 2026 for Nintendo Switch, Switch 2, PlayStation 5, and Windows via Steam.

== Premise ==
One year after Luke Triton departs England to live overseas in America, Professor Layton receives a letter from his former apprentice inviting him to come and solve a mystery in the technologically-advanced town of Steam Bison. In America, it is Luke rather than the professor who is renowned for his puzzle-solving skills; but the two must work together to discover the truth behind the ghostly cowboy, Gunman Joe, haunting the town.

== Development ==
New World of Steam was announced for the Nintendo Switch during the Nintendo Direct on 8 February 2023, with no release date revealed. No gameplay was shown; the teaser trailer consisted of Professor Hershel Layton walking through an industrial area. A new trailer was released in March 2023, revealing that the game takes place one year after the end of Professor Layton and the Unwound Future, with the story taking place in an American town named Steam Bison. Steam Bison has a steampunk aesthetic.

In November 2023, it was announced that New World of Steam would be released in 2025. Some details of the plot were released on the game's official website, with "highly advanced steam engines" causing a technological revolution in Steam Bison and a "mysterious incident" prompting Luke Triton to invite Hershel Layton to the town. A second trailer dropped two days before the Tokyo Game Show in 2024, detailing more of the game's plot and showing a new antagonist in Gunman King Joe, a mysterious ghostly cowboy-like figure. At the game show itself, a timed demo was publicly available. On September 25, 2025, Level-5 once again showcased the game at the Tokyo Game Show. During the showcase, it was revealed that the Switch 2 version will support mouse controls.

The puzzles for the game will be designed by a Japanese quiz group named QuizKnock, as Akira Tago, the puzzle designer for the other Professor Layton games, died in 2016. In the Japanese dub, Yo Oizumi will be reprising his role as Hershel Layton from previous titles, while Mio Imada will be voicing Luke Triton in place of Maki Horikita, who announced her retirement from acting in 2017.

Another trailer was released in April 2026, along with an interview with the Japanese voice cast. The theme song for the game is composed by Joe Hisaishi, with lyrics written and performed by Lilas Ikuta.

A new trailer was released in the Nintendo Direct on 9 September 2026, officially revealing the release date and the premise of the game, with one more trailer released the following day from Level-5.

On November 12, 2026, the game's international voice cast was announced, with Christopher Robin Miller and Lani Minella revealed to be reprising their long-time roles as Professor Layton and Luke in English; in the UK version, Minella is replaced with Cat Protano, herself replacing Maria Darling from previous entries.

== Release ==
Professor Layton and the New World of Steam's worldwide release was initially advertised to be in 2025 on the Nintendo Switch and Nintendo Switch 2; however, Level-5 announced on September 25, 2025 that the release window was pushed to the following year. On April 10, 2026, Level-5 publicized that the game was on track for a worldwide simultaneous release later in 2026 and that it would also launch on PlayStation 5 and Windows, marking the first time a Professor Layton game has appeared on either platform. The game went up for digital preorder on November 12, 2026, with a preorder bonus being an 11-track digital album of themes from across the series.
