= Layton Mystery Tanteisha: Katori no Nazotoki File =

Japanese anime television series

レイトン ミステリー探偵社 ～カトリーのナゾトキファイル～ (Reiton Misuterī Tantei-sha ~Katorī no Nazotoki Fairu~)
- Anime television series
- Directed by: Susumu Mitsunaka
- Written by: Akihiro Hino
- Music by: Tomohito Nishiura
- Studio: Liden Films
- Original network: Fuji TV
- Original run: April 8, 2018 – March 31, 2019
- Episodes: 50
- Novel series
- Written by: Ayumu Hikawa
- Published by: Shōgakukan
- Imprint: Junior Bunko
- Original run: June 29, 2018 – September 28, 2018
- Volumes: 4

Layton Mystery Detective Agency: Katri's Puzzle Solving Files (Japanese: レイトン ミステリー探偵社 ～カトリーのナゾトキファイル～, Hepburn: Reiton Misuterī Tantei-sha ~Katorī no Nazotoki Fairu~) is an anime television series produced by Liden Films. Centering around characters from Level-5's 2017 video game, Layton's Mystery Journey, part of the Professor Layton franchise, the series began airing on Fuji TV's Adventure Sunday programming block from April 8, 2018, and concluded on March 31, 2019. Novelisations of episodes 1–9 and 11–13 were published by Shōgakukan's Junior Bunko in four three-case installments.

== Plot ==
Adapting the events of Millionaires' Conspiracy, the series follows Katrielle "Katri" Layton, daughter of the renowned Professor Hershel Layton, who has set up the Layton Detective Agency alongside her self-appointed assistant, Ernest Greeves, and taken on a client-in-residence in the form of an amnesiac talking dog she dubs Sherl. Together, the trio take on all kinds of requests to solve mysterious cases troubling their fellow Britons.

== Cast ==
The anime features an all-new main cast.

- Kana Hanazawa as Katrielle "Katri" Layton – A quirky and enthusiastic young detective who aims to solve any case, no matter how strange.
- Jūrōta Kosugi as Sherlo / Sherl – A talking dog adopted by Katrielle, who can only be understood by a select few.
- Kyōsuke Ikeda as Noah Montol / Ernest Greeves – Katrielle's devoted and mildly infatuated assistant at the Agency.
- Yōhei Tadano as Darjeeling Aspoirot / Ercule Hastings – A police detective who often requests Katrielle's aid.
- Hibiku Yamamura as Geraldine Royer / Emiliana Perfetti – A police profiler and investigative rival of Katrielle.
- Koichi Yamadera as Professor Hershel Layton – A legendary puzzle-solving archaeologist and father to Katrielle, who mysteriously disappeared when she was a child.
- Soma Saito as Luke Triton – The Professor's faithful assistant from many years ago.

Other roles are retained by the original game cast, with the exception of a minor role occupied by Tadano, which was recast. The passing of Tetsuo Gotō on November 6, 2018, necessitated the recasting of his character, previously featured in the series' 28th episode, for episodes 47 and 48.

== Production ==
The series was first officially revealed in December 2017, following a previous report that a Professor Layton anime was in production. The 50-episode series is produced by Liden Films and directed by Susumu Mitsunaka, animation director of the original game, with creative direction and series composition by series creator Akihiro Hino, music by series stalwart Tomohito Nishiura, and character design by Yoko Takada, based in part on Takuzō Nagano's original designs. CJ ENM, a South Korean entertainment company, co-funded into the production and later acquired the distribution rights for Tooniverse.

The series began airing in Japan on April 8, 2018, as part of Fuji TV's Adventure Sunday programming block. Bomanbridge Media have distribution rights to the series in other Asian territories. It features adaptations of the twelve cases from the original game with new story elements, alongside a large number of original standalone mysteries and an all-new story arc featuring originating series protagonists Professor Hershel Layton and Luke Triton. Many episodes pay homage to a diverse array of popular media properties, making pastiche of Panty & Stocking with Garterbelt, Bewitched, Bayside Shakedown, and Iron Chef, and reference to a range of others, including Mission: Impossible, Friday the 13th, and Marvel Comics' Spider-Man.

The first half of the series featured opening theme "Change!" (チェンジっ！, Chenji!) by Kana Adachi, who also portrays a recurring character, and ending theme "Daijoubu" (大丈夫; "It'll Be Alright") by Kana Hanazawa, who occasionally hums the tune in-character as Katrielle. From the twenty-sixth episode onwards, the opening and ending themes were replaced with "blooming" (ブルーミング, burūmingu) by Rei Yasuda and "Ashita mo, Sekai wa Mawarukara" (明日も、世界は回るから。; "Tomorrow, the World Will Turn") by the then-J☆Dee'Z, respectively.

In conjunction with the series, Takara Tomy released a line of "puzzle-solving charm" accessories, usable in the mobile and Switch versions of the original game via near-field communication. As part of their promotion, different charms were featured in Katrielle's outfit both across stories and in an alternating set of variants of the original opening animation. A competition was also held, the goal of which was to design an outfit for Katrielle which would then appear on-screen.

== Episode list ==
No.	Title	Original release date
1	"Katrielle and the Mysterious House"; Transliteration: "Katorīeiru to Fushigi na Ie" (Japanese: カトリーエイルと不思議な家)	April 8, 2018
A client attracted by the illustrious Layton name sets Katrielle, Ernest, and Sherl the task of investigating a mysterious house in which his newly moved-in family suddenly and inexplicably disappeared.
2	"Katrielle and the Diabolical Dress"; Transliteration: "Katorīeiru to Akuma no Doresu" (Japanese: カトリーエイルと悪魔のドレス)	April 15, 2018
Katrielle is approached by Pastel, a struggling musician, who claims that a strange dress he bought for his wife Olivia is causing her to become possessed.
3	"Katrielle and the Resurrected Corpse"; Transliteration: "Katorīeiru to Yomigaeru Shitai" (Japanese: カトリーエイルと蘇る死体)	April 22, 2018
A young woman named Liv seeks Katrielle's help after she is visited by her late husband, Andy, apparently returned to life as a zombie.
4	"Katrielle and the Phantom Thief of the Century"; Transliteration: "Katorīeiru to Seiki no Daikaitō" (Japanese: カトリーエイルと世紀の大怪盗)	April 29, 2018
Inspector Hastings enlists the Agency's assistance in tracking down a serial jewel thief after the criminal names the British Museum as the site of their most daring heist yet.
5	"Katrielle and the Lucky Man"; Transliteration: "Katorīeiru to Kōun'na Otoko" (Japanese: カトリーエイルと幸運な男)	May 6, 2018
The team becomes involved in a new case when a young man approaches the Agency in the hope of discovering a way to resume an implausible lucky streak.
6	"Katrielle and the Bus that Leapt Beyond Time"; Transliteration: "Katorīeiru to Toki o Koeru Basu" (Japanese: カトリーエイルと時を超えるバス)	May 13, 2018
Katrielle stumbles upon a fresh mystery when a classmate of Ernest relates the story of a mysterious bus journey that seemingly transported them back to the time of their childhood.
7	"Ratman Returns"; Transliteration: "Rattoman Ritānzu" (Japanese: ラットマン・リターンズ)	May 20, 2018
The Agency is visited by a young boy named Leo who fears that the mysterious hero of London's streets, Ratman, has been kidnapped.
8	"100,000,000 Pounds Gone with the Wind"; Transliteration: "Ichi-oku-pondo wa Kaze to Tomo ni Sarinu" (Japanese: 1億ポンドは風と共に去りぬ)	May 27, 2018
The team are summoned by Inspector Hastings to the site of a seemingly impossible burglary: one hundred million pounds have vanished from a high-tech bank vault.
9	"The Cat-Colored Skyscraper"; Transliteration: "Matenrō wa Neko-iro ni" (Japanese: 摩天楼は猫色に)	June 3, 2018
Katrielle is called to the estate of a millionaire gourmet with an unusual request: her pet has gone missing, and she wants it found before her dinner party commences.
10	"Professor Layton and the Relics Treasure: Episode 1"; Transliteration: "Reiton Kyōju to Hihō Rerikusu Episōdo 1" (Japanese: レイトン教授と秘宝レリクス エピソード1)	June 10, 2018
Rosa, an old acquaintance of Katrielle's father, visits the Agency with information relating to the Professor's disappearance eleven years ago.
11	"Mysterious Case at New Cinema Paradise"; Transliteration: "Kai Jiken Nyūshinemaparadaisu" (Japanese: 怪事件ニューシネマパラダイス)	June 17, 2018
The Agency attend the premier of a much-anticipated film, only to discover mid-scene that the moment of the climactic kiss has disappeared from the reel.
12	"London's Holiday for Aspoirot"; Transliteration: "Asupowaro no Rondon no Kyūjitsu" (Japanese: アスポワロのロンドンの休日)	June 24, 2018
Relaxing on a public holiday, the Agency team become embroiled in a highly unusual case when a desperate Inspector Hastings pleads their aid in finding a last-minute gift for his wife's birthday.
13	"Katrielle and the Doppelgänger"; Transliteration: "Katorīeiru to Dopperugengā" (Japanese: カトリーエイルとドッペルゲンガー)	July 1, 2018
Katrielle takes on a new case involving a young pianist who is being plagued by appearances of a doppelgänger.
14	"Genius Analyst Officer Geraldine Royer"; Transliteration: "Tensai Bunseki-kan Jerarudin Roiyā" (Japanese: 天才分析官ジェラルディン・ロイヤー)	July 8, 2018
Katrielle and co. are left puzzled when Hastings requests their help on a case where the culprit has already been uncovered.
15	"Katrielle and the Mystery Circles"; Transliteration: "Katorīeiru to Misuterī Sākuru" (Japanese: カトリーエイルとミステリーサークル)	July 15, 2018
The Agency receives a new mystery to solve when a young farmer by the name of Mintan details the unexplained appearance of strange patterns in his wheat fields.
16	"Katrielle and the Pandas' March"; Transliteration: "Katorīeiru to Panda no Kōshin" (Japanese: カトリーエイルとパンダの行進)	July 22, 2018
Katrielle investigates a young girl on behalf of her concerned mother, Dora, who believes her daughter is able to predict the future.
17	"Katrielle and the Monster of London"; Transliteration: "Katorīeiru to Rondon no Kaibutsu" (Japanese: カトリーエイルとロンドンの怪物)	July 29, 2018
Hastings turns to the Agency trio when London is menaced by a mysterious growling giant lurking in the fog.
18	"Molentary Express and Three Incidents"; Transliteration: "Morentorī Kyūkō to Mittsu no Jiken" (Japanese: モレントリー急行と3つの事件)	August 5, 2018
Travelling on board the Molentary Express for a special solar eclipse tour, the team find their attention divided when clients old and new describe a sequence of strange events.
19	"The Lonely Ghost"; Transliteration: "Sabishigariya no Gōsuto" (Japanese: 寂しがり屋のゴースト)	August 12, 2018
The team are summoned by a young heiress whose estate appears to be haunted by a host of ethereal apparitions.
20	"Professor Layton and the Relics Treasure: Episode 2"; Transliteration: "Reiton Kyōju to Hihō Rerikusu Episōdo 2" (Japanese: レイトン教授と秘宝レリクス エピソード2)	August 19, 2018
Rosa returns to continue her story, and reveals the link between Katrielle's origins and the Professor's disappearance.
21	"Katrielle and the Sweet-Scented Street Labyrinth"; Transliteration: "Katorīeiru to Amai Kaori no Meikyū-dōri" (Japanese: カトリーエイルと甘い香りの迷宮通り)	August 26, 2018
In search of sweets of legendary reputation, Katrielle is hooked when she is told that she will have to prove her connoisseur qualifications by locating the nearby store herself.
22	"Ultra-High Performance Robot Sketman"; Transliteration: "Chō Kōseinō Robotto Sukettoman" (Japanese: 超高性能ロボット スケットマン)	September 2, 2018
Katrielle is invited to the unveiling of Agency acquaintance and child genius Bengary's latest invention: Sketman John, a robotic renaissance-manservant.
23	"Katrielle and the Great Office Infiltration Strategy"; Transliteration: "Katorīeiru to Ofisu Sen'nyū Dai Sakusen" (Japanese: カトリーエイルとオフィス潜入大作戦)	September 16, 2018
One of London's famous "seven millionaires" requests the team's investigative attentions after discovering a love letter written by his much-adored daughter, Allie.
24	"The Clockwork Sweets"; Transliteration: "Tokei Shikake no Suu~ītsu" (Japanese: 時計仕掛けのスウィーツ)	September 23, 2018
Hastings employs the Agency's efforts in the search for a hand belonging to Big Ben, in the hope of recovering it before the arrival of a foreign ambassador.
25	"A Riverside Festival Love Story"; Transliteration: "Aruainoshi Ribāsaidofesutibaru" (Japanese: ある愛の詩 リバーサイドフェスティバル)	September 30, 2018
Katrielle joins an investigation at London's Riverside Festival into a tragic incident that took place on the banks of the River Thames, mirroring a local legend.
26	"The Diary of Noah"; Transliteration: "Noa-kun no Nikki" (Japanese: ノア君の日記)	October 7, 2018
Ernest recounts the time he was accused of stealing valuable research papers on his first day at Gressenheller University, and his resultant first encounter with Katrielle.
27	"Fugitive Katri"; Transliteration: "Tōbō-sha Katorī" (Japanese: 逃亡者カトリー)	October 14, 2018
The Agency team are forced to go on the run from the law after Katrielle finds herself the prime suspect in a murder investigation.
28	"The Goddess of the Thames Smiles a Second Time"; Transliteration: "Temuzu no Megami wa Ni-do Hohoemu" (Japanese: テムズの女神は二度微笑む)	October 21, 2018
Katrielle finds yet another mystery on her hands when a celebratory treasure hunt held on a luxury cruise ship's inaugural voyage goes awry.
29	"Katrielle and the Nessie of Loch Nem"; Transliteration: "Katorīeiru to Nemu Mizuumi no Nessuī" (Japanese: カトリーエイルとネム湖のネッスィー)	October 28, 2018
The Agency trio travel to the Scottish Highlands after receiving a request to investigate recent sightings of the famous "Nessie" creature on the waters of Loch Nem.
30	"Katrielle and the Immortal Vampire"; Transliteration: "Katorīeiru to Fushi no Banpaia" (Japanese: カトリーエイルと不死のバンパイア)	November 4, 2018
A new client, Hans, approaches the Agency after a nocturnal encounter with a figure resembling an old friend, unchanged in appearance despite a thirty-five year absence.
31	"Katrielle and the Witch Wife"; Transliteration: "Katorīeiru to Okusama wa Majo" (Japanese: カトリーエイルと奥様は魔女)	November 11, 2018
Strange goings-on in a suburban domicile lead the Agency's latest client to seek their advice as to whether or not his wife has become a witch.
32	"Katrielle and the Prince of the Stars"; Transliteration: "Katorīeiru to Hoshi no Purinsu" (Japanese: カトリーエイルと星のプリンス)	November 18, 2018
Katrielle takes on the task of reuniting a young woman with the object of her affections, a man who claimed to hail from another planet.
33	"Katrielle and the Murder on the Spaceship Bengarian"; Transliteration: "Katorīeiru to Uchūsen Bengarian no Satsujin" (Japanese: カトリーエイルと宇宙船ベンガリアンの殺人)	November 25, 2018
Bengary challenges the Agency team to solving their most ambitious case yet: a murder mystery from the realm of his own imagination.
34	"Professor Layton and the Relics Treasure: Episode 3"; Transliteration: "Reiton Kyōju to Hihō Rerikusu Episōdo 3" (Japanese: レイトン教授と秘宝レリクス エピソード3)	December 2, 2018
On the tail of the fabled Relics, the Professor and Luke of eleven years prior close in on a shadowy figure, while Katrielle and co. trace their whereabouts in the present.
35	"Professor Layton and the Relics Treasure: Episode 4"; Transliteration: "Reiton Kyōju to Hihō Rerikusu Episōdo 4" (Japanese: レイトン教授と秘宝レリクス エピソード4)	December 9, 2018
The paths of the parties past and present converge in Southampton, as the final hours before the duo's disappearance count down.
36	"The Cursed London Collection"; Transliteration: "Norowareta Rondonkorekushon" (Japanese: 呪われたロンドンコレクション)	December 16, 2018
Angel Arrow CEO Bergman calls on the Agency after the label's four showcase dresses vanish two nights before the world's biggest fashion show.
37	"Mintan's New Ambition"; Transliteration: "Mintan Aratanaru Yabō" (Japanese: ミンタン 新たなる野望)	December 23, 2018
The Agency is visited by Mintan's fellow farmworkers, seeking the team's help after a sudden personality change in their old friend transformed him from hard-working agronomist to obnoxious gambler sporting an improbable winning streak.
38	"Dancing Scotland Yard Great Investigation Line"; Transliteration: "Odoru Sukottorandoyādo Dai Sōsa-sen" (Japanese: 踊るスコットランドヤード大捜査線)	January 6, 2019
Katrielle joins a Scotland Yard blockade erected around a bridge due for demolition after Bengary's latest Sketman, Punch, takes up residence. With the giant robot incapable of vocal communication, Katrielle must figure out the reason behind its behavior to put an end to the standoff.
39	"Katrielle and the Invisible Baby"; Transliteration: "Katorīeiru to Tōmei Beibī" (Japanese: カトリーエイルと透明ベイビー)	January 13, 2019
An Agencybound Katrielle receives a call from babysitter Kelly, whose concerns are centered around her latest assignation appearing to include an invisible infant.
40	"Geraldine Royer and the Final Customer"; Transliteration: "Jerarudin Roiyā to Saigo no Kyaku" (Japanese: ジェラルディン・ロイヤーと最後の客)	January 20, 2019
Spurred by a horoscope warning that the only recourse to having "the worst day of the decade" might be to spend it with a friend, Katrielle decides to spend the day with Emiliana at a local café, unaware that the adroit analyst has her own plans. Emiliana challenges Katrielle to play at guessing the professions of their fellow customers, pitting the former's highly professional profiling skill squarely against the latter's esoteric and impulsive investigation methods.
41	"Katrielle and the Strange Spirit Photo"; Transliteration: "Katorīeiru to Kimyōna Shinrei Shashin" (Japanese: カトリーエイルと奇妙な心霊写真)	January 27, 2019
In the wake of discovering a recurring phantom figure appearing in his images, London Times photographer Pete contacts the Agency, fearing that he has fallen victim to a curse.
42	"Great Detective Sherlo Ckholmes"; Transliteration: "Mei Tantei Shāro Kkuhōmuzu" (Japanese: 名探偵シャーロ・ックホームズ)	February 3, 2019
Tired of being treated like the Agency dogsbody, Sherl jumps at the chance to conduct his own investigation into the reported death of a beloved member of the neighborhood pack.
43	"Katrielle and Horror Castle VR"; Transliteration: "Katorīeiru to Horākyassuru VR" (Japanese: カトリーエイルとホラーキャッスルVR)	February 10, 2019
The Agency trio are recruited by an old client with the goal of completing a challenging "virtual reality game".
44	"Katrielle and the Superman Chef"; Transliteration: "Katorīeiru to Ryōri no Chōjin" (Japanese: カトリーエイルと料理の超人)	February 17, 2019
After an incident involving a misunderstood "all-you-can-eat" restaurant opening and Katrielle's insatiable appetite, the eager investigator accepts the offer of a cook-off challenge to settle her debt.
45	"Katrielle and the Ghost Club"; Transliteration: "Katorīeiru to Gōsuto Kurabu" (Japanese: カトリーエイルとゴースト倶楽部)	February 24, 2019
Supernatural superfan Andrea, youngest of the seven millionaires, invites Katrielle and a selection of her acquaintances to compete in a game of "Ghost Escape".
46	"Katrielle and the Hundred Faces of Mona Lisa"; Transliteration: "Katorīeiru to Monariza Hyakumensō" (Japanese: カトリーエイルとモナリザ百面相)	March 3, 2019
The Agency trio's trip to the Marylebone Museum of Art to see the famous Mona Lisa takes a strange turn when Katrielle is informed that the museum's entire collection has been surreptitiously replaced with an array of Lisa-centric works.
47	"The Millionaire Ariadne's Conspiracy (former part)" Transliteration: "Daifūgō Ariadone no Inbō (zenpen)" (Japanese: 大富豪アリアドネの陰謀（前編）)	March 10, 2019
Receiving an invitation addressed to her father requesting attendance of a puzzle-solving event hosted by the mysterious Ariadne, Katrielle and company find themselves reunited with all seven of the renowned London millionaires at the deserted mansion of a deceased magnate.
48	"The Millionaire Ariadne's Conspiracy (latter part)" Transliteration: "Daifūgō Ariadone no Inbō (kōhen)" (Japanese: 大富豪アリアドネの陰謀（後編）)	March 17, 2019
With the realisation that the Seven are hiding a secret, Katrielle's investigation takes an unexpected turn, and as she pieces together the mystery, the true identity of their host is revealed.
49	"Professor Layton and the Relics Treasure: Episode 5"; Transliteration: "Reiton Kyōju to Hihō Rerikusu Episōdo 5" (Japanese: レイトン教授と秘宝レリクス エピソード5)	March 24, 2019
In the wake of having located Luke and the Professor, Katrielle's investigatory instincts refuse to let her rest, compelling the team to follow the trail of the mysterious "Aldebaran" to his palatial home in search of answers.
50	"Professor Layton and the Relics Treasure: Final Episode"; Transliteration: "Reiton Kyōju to Hihō Rerikusu Fainaruepisōdo" (Japanese: レイトン教授と秘宝レリクス ファイナルエピソード)	March 31, 2019
The two parties united at last, their long journey comes to a climactic conclusion in a fateful showdown at the Greenwich Observatory with the man behind the entire conspiracy.
