= Professor Layton =

Japanese video game series developed by Level-5

- The original logo for the Professor Layton series
- Genres: Puzzle, adventure
- Developers: Level-5; Matrix Software
- Publishers: Level-5; Nintendo
- Creator: Akihiro Hino
- Artists: Takuzō Nagano; Jun Suzuki
- Composer: Tomohito Nishiura
- Platforms: Nintendo DS, Nintendo 3DS, Android, iOS, Nintendo Switch, Nintendo Switch 2, PlayStation 5, Windows
- First release: Professor Layton and the Curious Village; February 15, 2007
- Latest release: Layton's Mystery Journey; July 20, 2017

Professor Layton (Note: Known in Japan as Reiton-kyōju (レイトン教授)) is a puzzle adventure video game series and transmedia franchise developed by Level-5. The property consists primarily of seven main video games, a mobile spin-off, an animated theatrical film, and an anime television series, while additionally incorporating an array of secondary titles and media, including a crossover game with Capcom's Ace Attorney series.

The first three games follow the adventures of Professor Hershel Layton and his apprentice Luke Triton, while the subsequent three games and film are prequels, focusing on how Luke and Layton met and their original adventures; later installments also follow the escapades of Layton's children and their respective allies. Each title features a series of puzzles and mysteries provided by the citizens of locales that the main characters explore. It is not necessary to solve all the puzzles to progress, but some are mandatory, and at certain points in the game a minimum number of puzzles must be solved before the story can continue.

The Professor Layton series had sold over 20 million units by April 2026, retaining the title of Level-5's best-selling game franchise.

== History ==
=== Conception ===
The idea behind the Professor Layton formula was a direct result of series creator Akihiro Hino's childhood love of Akira Tago's popular Atama no Taisou series of puzzle books, which have sold more than 12 million copies to date in Japan.

The main character of the original Layton games is Professor Hershel Layton, a renowned archaeologist and professor at Gressenheller University, as well as a polite and well-spoken gentleman. He is called to solve various mysteries in different places, due to his connections to various people and his wide range of expertise. The Professor is accompanied by his apprentice, Luke Triton, a cheerful and curious boy who brings a touch of humor to the story of Layton. According to Hino, Layton is partly inspired by the character of Phoenix Wright of the Ace Attorney series. Assessing the "good points" and "bad points" of the character, he developed Professor Layton. Luke and Layton's character designs, including the latter's iconic top hat, were the work of Takuzō Nagano, whose brief included the requirement of recognisability by form and colour palette, particularly at small sizes. The games were also inspired by the Indiana Jones franchise.

=== Games ===
Series	European / Australian title	North American title	System	Japanese release	International release
Original Trilogy	Professor Layton and the Curious Village		Nintendo DS/iOS/Android	February 15, 2007	February 10, 2008
Original Trilogy	Professor Layton and Pandora's Box	Professor Layton and the Diabolical Box	Nintendo DS/iOS/Android	November 29, 2007	August 24, 2009
Original Trilogy	Professor Layton and the Lost Future	Professor Layton and the Unwound Future	Nintendo DS/iOS/Android	November 27, 2008	September 12, 2010
Prequel Trilogy	Professor Layton and the Spectre's Call	Professor Layton and the Last Specter	Nintendo DS	November 26, 2009	October 17, 2011
Prequel Trilogy	Professor Layton and the Miracle Mask		Nintendo 3DS	February 26, 2011	October 26, 2012
Prequel Trilogy	Professor Layton and the Azran Legacy		Nintendo 3DS	February 28, 2013	November 8, 2013
Spin-off	Layton Brothers: Mystery Room		iOS/Android	September 21, 2012	June 27, 2013
Crossover	Professor Layton vs. Phoenix Wright: Ace Attorney		Nintendo 3DS	November 29, 2012	March 28, 2014
Spin-off	Layton's Mystery Journey: Katrielle and the Millionaires' Conspiracy		Nintendo 3DS/Nintendo Switch/iOS/Android	July 20, 2017 (3DS) / August 9, 2018 (Switch)	October 6, 2017 (3DS) / November 8, 2019 (Switch)
Sequel game	Professor Layton and the New World of Steam		Nintendo Switch/Nintendo Switch 2/PlayStation 5/Windows	December 10, 2026	

Release timeline
2007	Professor Layton and the Curious Village
2007	Professor Layton and the Diabolical/Pandora's Box
2008	Professor Layton and the Unwound/Lost Future
2009	Professor Layton and the Last Specter/Spectre's Call
2010
2011	Professor Layton and the Miracle Mask
2012	Layton Brothers: Mystery Room
2012	Professor Layton vs. Phoenix Wright: Ace Attorney
2013	Professor Layton and the Azran Legacy
2014
2015
2016
2017	Layton's Mystery Journey: Katrielle and the Millionaires' Conspiracy
2018
2019
2020
2021
2022
2023
2024
2025
2026	Professor Layton and the New World of Steam

- Professor Layton and the Curious Village (レイトン教授と不思議な町) The first game in the series, released for the Nintendo DS in Japan on February 15, 2007, and localized for release elsewhere during 2008.
- Professor Layton and the Diabolical Box/Pandora's Box (レイトン教授と悪魔の箱) The second game in the series, released for the DS in Japan on November 29, 2007, and localized for release elsewhere during 2009. The Japanese release featured an exclusive prologue, Professor Layton and London's Holiday (レイトン教授とロンドンの休日), including twelve puzzles, several of which are from the first game, and a short storyline set in Professor Layton's London office, in which he reminisces about his previous adventures around the world.
- Professor Layton and the Unwound Future/Lost Future (レイトン教授と最後の時間旅行) The third game in the series and final part of the original trilogy, released for the DS in Japan on November 27, 2008, and localized for release elsewhere during 2010. This game is currently the last game in the series to feature the Professor, chronologically.
- Professor Layton and the Last Specter/Spectre's Call (レイトン教授と魔神の笛) The fourth game in the series and first installment of the prequel sequence was released for the DS in Japan on November 26, 2009, and elsewhere in 2011. It is, chronologically, the earliest game in the series. In Japan, North America and Australasia, the game also includes an RPG called Professor Layton's London Life, which was co-developed by the then-Brownie Brown. It was excluded from the European version due to "time constraints" surrounding translation.
- Professor Layton and the Miracle Mask (レイトン教授と奇跡の仮面) The fifth game in the series, released as a launch title for the Nintendo 3DS on February 26, 2011, in Japan, releasing in Europe and Australasia on October 26, 2012, and in North America on the October 28, 2012, and taking place after Eternal Diva chronologically. The game was the first to feature a continuous daily puzzle service available through the Nintendo Network via SpotPass for a full year.
- Layton Brothers: Mystery Room (レイトンブラザーズ・ミステリールーム) A mobile spin-off game starring Alfendi Layton, son of Professor Layton. It was released on the iOS App Store on September 21, 2012, in Japan, and on June 27, 2013, in Australia, Europe and North America, and received a worldwide September 9, 2013, release for Android systems. It marked Level-5's first foray into iOS games.
- Professor Layton vs. Phoenix Wright: Ace Attorney (レイトン教授VS逆転裁判) Announced on October 19, 2010, at Level-5's annual vision event, this game was a cooperative project between Level-5 and Capcom, and a crossover between the Professor Layton and Ace Attorney series. It was released in Japan for the Nintendo 3DS on 29 November 2012, in Europe on 28 March 2014, a day later in Australia, and on 29 August 2014 in North America.
- Professor Layton and the Azran Legacy (レイトン教授と超文明Aの遺産) The sixth game and conclusion of the prequel sequence, taking place after the planned second film chronologically, In a Nintendo Direct presentation on August 29, 2012, it was revealed by Level 5 CEO Akihiro Hino to be the final Layton title to star the Professor himself as the protagonist. It was released for the 3DS in Japan on February 28, 2013, Europe on November 8, 2013, and North America on February 28, 2014.
- Layton's Mystery Journey: Katrielle and the Millionaires' Conspiracy (レイトン ミステリージャーニー カトリーエイルと大富豪の陰謀) The seventh entry in the main Professor Layton series follows a new protagonist, Katrielle Layton - daughter of Professor Layton. The game was released worldwide for mobile devices and on 3DS in Japan on July 20, 2017, with the North American/European 3DS release on October 6, 2017. A Nintendo Switch version was released in Japan on August 9, 2018, and in North America and Europe on November 8, 2019.
- Professor Layton and the New World of Steam (レイトン教授と蒸気の新世界) The eighth entry in the main Professor Layton series, a direct sequel to Unwound Future, and the seventh to have Layton in a starring role, was announced via a Nintendo Direct on February 8, 2023. The game is set to be released on December 10, 2026 on the Nintendo Switch, Nintendo Switch 2, PlayStation 5, and Windows.

Japanese audiences have also received several revisions of previously released games. Both Curious Village and Diabolical Box were afforded a "Friendly Version", in which all weekly puzzles were unlocked and furigana, absent in the first two instalments, added. A release of Curious Village was produced for feature phones, while Diabolical Box was also included in the "Level-5 Premium Silver" and "Gold" collections on Nintendo DS alongside another Level-5 game, Inazuma Eleven. Miracle Mask later received a "Plus" edition, featuring exclusive puzzles, game events and cutscenes in addition to mechanical improvements already seen in the international releases.

Internationally, Millionaires' Conspiracy was rereleased as an enhanced Nintendo Switch port boasting new puzzles, exclusive costumes, and all previous DLC. An enhanced mobile port of Curious Village featuring additional cutscenes and unlockable content has also seen a worldwide release, followed by mobile ports of the second and third games.

==== Cancelled and deleted ====
Several mobile games were made available in Japan, including a crossover with Kaitō Royale, but have since become unavailable after their distribution services were closed. Another game, initially planned for 3DS and mobile, dubbed Layton 7, was announced in 2013, featuring the Professor as a selectable avatar in a mafia-style social game. It was again presented at the 2015 Level-5 Vision, but failed to materialise within its release window and has since been removed from the company's website.

=== Future ===
Hino confirmed plans for another entry under the Mystery Journey banner prior to the release of Millionaires' Conspiracy, later suggesting that a game starring the Professor and based on his arc in the anime series would be the franchise's next installment.

In February 2023, a Switch-bound game titled Professor Layton and The New World of Steam was announced in a Nintendo Direct presentation.

== Gameplay ==
The original puzzle interface for the Professor Layton games utilises a split display, allowing the player to use touch interaction on the lower screen to solve the teaser while following the instructions detailed on the upper screen. This puzzle is from Professor Layton and the Unwound Future.

The games employ an integrated structure of adventure-style exploration, dialogue sequences, and regular story-prompted puzzle solving. The player (as Professor Layton, Luke, and other characters) explores their environment in the manner of a point-and-click adventure game, using the touch screen to talk with non-player characters, learn more about the environment, or locate hidden secrets such as "hint coins" that may be used during puzzles. Often, when interacting with a person or object, the player will be presented with a puzzle, valued at a certain number of "picarats", a type of point system within the game. Solving the puzzle correctly will earn the player the full number of picarats, but a wrong answer will reduce the points by small increments with each attempt, until it reaches a minimal picarat number. In order to progress the plot, the player is required to solve specific puzzles, or to solve a minimum number of puzzles. If the player permanently leaves an area or otherwise significantly progresses the plot, puzzles they have yet to find and/or solve are regularly compiled and placed into a collection, often in the form of a "Puzzle Shack" owned by a character known as "Granny Riddleton", or with the aforementioned Riddleton's cat, "Keats", which they can return to and attempt to resolve later. Curious Village contains a total of 135 regular puzzles, while Diabolical Box contains 153, Unwound Future 168 (the latter two having another special puzzle obtained via the use of codes found in the previous game), Last Specter 170, Miracle Mask 150 (165 in the "Plus" edition), Azran Legacy 165, and Millionaires' Conspiracy 185.

The puzzles take the form of brain teasers, most of which are only loosely tied to the plot, developed for the first six games under the oversight of Akira Tago, famous for his best-selling Mental Gymnastics series. They encompass a diverse range of styles, from logic puzzles to lateral thinking problems, mazes, math problems, sliding-block puzzles, and others. The games allow the player to bring up a translucent memo screen they can write on, using the stylus, to work out their answer before submission. If the player is stuck, they may spend one hint coin to receive a hint. Each puzzle has three regular hints available, and, from the third game onwards, feature "super hints" that tend towards nearly solving the puzzle for the player, but which can only be bought with two hint coins and after the three other hints have been revealed. The puzzles are not timed, though some require correct timing, and others, such as mazes and sliding puzzles, may challenge the player to achieve completion in a limited number of moves.

Each game features an additional set of three unique meta-puzzle minigames that can be accessed when the player has access to the pause menu "Layton's Trunk". These minigames generally require the player to complete specific puzzles in the game to receive items and/or challenges within the minigame. For example, in return for solving particular puzzles, characters in Curious Village will award the player with an item of furniture, which then must be placed within a set of apartments to Layton's and Luke's exacting desires; the minigame cannot be completed until all the furniture has been collected. Completing the story and minigames also unlocks a series of especially difficult puzzles, known as "Layton's Challenges". Prior to its cancellation, players of the four DS games could use the Nintendo Wi-Fi Connection service to connect to the internet and access a "weekly puzzle" service, whereby they could download a new puzzle for each week following a game's release for a set period; later mainline 3DS games would expand on this with a year-long daily puzzle service via the Nintendo Network.

== Story ==
=== Setting ===
The series and its protagonists are based in and around an anachronistic contemporary London inspired by the 1960s, where antiquated technologies and vintage designs are still dominant. Each story features one or more original locales, each with their own unique geographies and local population. A common aesthetic element across these are urban areas and architectural landmarks in expressionist style.

=== Characters ===
Title	Hershel Layton	Luke Triton	Emmy Altava	Katrielle Layton	Sherl	Ernest Greeves
Curious Village	Yo Oizumi (JP); Christopher Robin Miller (EN)	Maki Horikita (JP); Lani Minella (NA); Maria Darling (UK)	N/A	N/A	N/A	N/A
Diabolical/Pandora's Box	Yo Oizumi (JP); Christopher Robin Miller (EN)	Maki Horikita (JP); Lani Minella (NA); Maria Darling (UK)	N/A	N/A	N/A	N/A
Unwound/Lost Future	Yo Oizumi (JP); Christopher Robin Miller (EN)	Maki Horikita (JP); Lani Minella (NA); Maria Darling (UK)	N/A	N/A	N/A	N/A
Last Specter/Spectre's Call	Yo Oizumi (JP); Christopher Robin Miller (EN)	Maki Horikita (JP); Lani Minella (NA); Maria Darling (UK)	Saki Aibu (JP); Lani Minella (EN)	N/A	N/A	N/A
Eternal Diva	Yo Oizumi (JP); Christopher Robin Miller (EN)	Maki Horikita (JP); Maria Darling (EN)	Saki Aibu (JP); Emma Tate (EN)	N/A	N/A	N/A
Miracle Mask	Yo Oizumi (JP); Christopher Robin Miller (EN)	Maki Horikita (JP); Lani Minella (NA); Maria Darling (UK)	Saki Aibu (JP); Lani Minella (EN)	N/A	N/A	N/A
vs. Phoenix Wright	Yo Oizumi (JP); Christopher Robin Miller (EN)	Maki Horikita (JP); Maria Darling (EN)	N/A	N/A	N/A	N/A
Azran Legacy	Yo Oizumi (JP); Christopher Robin Miller (EN)	Maki Horikita (JP); Lani Minella (NA); Maria Darling (UK)	Saki Aibu (JP); Lani Minella (EN)	N/A	N/A	N/A
Millionaires' Conspiracy	N/A	N/A	N/A	Kasumi Arimura (JP); Rosie Jones (EN)	Koji Yakusho (JP); James Barriscale (EN)	Kentaro Sakaguchi (JP); Tom Clegg (EN)
Nazotoki File	Kōichi Yamadera (JP)	Sōma Saitō (JP)	N/A	Kana Hanazawa (JP)	Jūrōta Kosugi (JP)	Kyōsuke Ikeda (JP)
New World of Steam	Yo Oizumi (JP); Christopher Robin Miller (EN)	Mio Imada (JP); Lani Minella (NA); Cat Protano (UK)	N/A	N/A	N/A	N/A

==== Main ====
Artwork from Professor Layton Royale, showing many characters from the series

- Professor Hershel Layton (エルシャール・レイトン, Erushāru Reiton) is the title character and original protagonist of the series. Having become a professor of archeology at London's Gressenheller University at age 27, he quickly became reputable for his highly diverse skill set, most particularly his formidable puzzle-solving prowess. He wears an iconic black top hat with a red band, along with an orange shirt under a black high-collared coat and matching pants, and behaves like a stereotypical English gentleman with a particular predilection for drinking tea. After sharing an adventure with Luke Triton, the son of his old friend, Clark, with whom he studied at university, he would take on the boy as his ward. After he and the young Luke parted ways, he would take on the role of father to two children, Alfendi and Katrielle.
- Luke Triton (ルーク・トライトン, Rūku Toraiton) is a keen follower and self proclaimed apprentice of the Professor who accompanies him on his investigations. Though he aspires to be a gentleman just like his mentor, his intelligence belies his age, and he can be hasty in his judgement and prone to let a cheeky remark slip out. He is fond of puzzles, teddy bears, and the color blue, and exhibits the ability to understand and converse with animals, as well as an appetite he can never seem to quench. His attire develops over time: while he consistently wears a sweater and unfastened suspenders throughout the first trilogy, in his chronologically earlier appearances he wears his uncovered suspenders fastened (in Last Specter and Eternal Diva), adds a buttoned vest (in Miracle Mask), then swaps it for an open cardigan (in Azran Legacy). Luke would begin travelling with Layton at the age of 10, an arrangement which would last for a little under four years until his move to the United States with his family. After studying abroad, a mature Luke and his wife, Marina Triton, whom he met during his college years, would return to England and ultimately reunite with the Professor.
- Alfendi Layton (アルフェンディ・レイトン, Arufendi Reiton) is a historied detective at New Scotland Yard and the son of Professor Layton. He struggles with a dissociative identity disorder featuring two distinct personalities, dubbed "Placid" and "Potty", but nonetheless demonstrates a highly refined faculty for investigative logic.
- Lucy Baker (ルーシー・クレイラ, Rūshī Kureira; Lucy Cleyera in Japanese version) is a greenhorn detective at New Scotland Yard assigned to Alfendi's "Mystery Room" department. Driven and occasionally a touch overenthusiastic, she complements the skills of her superior to a tee.
- Katrielle Layton (カトリーエイル・レイトン, Katorīeiru Reiton) is Professor Layton's adoptive daughter and puzzle-solving detective in her own right. With an eccentric investigation style and an insatiable craving for sweets, her unusual methods disguise an unparalleled ingenuity. After founding the Layton Detective Agency at 21 years of age and taking on her first respondent, a client-in-residence in the form of a "talking" dog she dubs Sherl, Katrielle makes solving mysteries of all shapes and sizes her mission, all the while searching for the Professor, who disappeared during her childhood.
- Ernest Greeves (ノア・モントール, Noa Montōru; Noah Montol in Japanese version) is the self-appointed assistant to Katrielle at the Layton Detective Agency. Having joined at the age of 19, he is a slightly awkward investigator, and nurses a mild crush on Katrielle, but remains diligent and dutiful to a fault.

==== Recurring ====
- Flora Reinhold (アロマ・ラインフォード, Aroma Rainfōdo; Aroma Reinford in Japanese version) is the orphaned daughter of the wealthy Augustus Reinhold and his wife, Violet. After the events of Curious Village, Layton and Luke help her resettle in London. She aspires to live a lifestyle akin to that of the duo, occasionally joining them on their investigations, and is a budding protégée ("bride candidate" in the Japanese original) of the Professor. She also loves to cook, but, unfortunately, lacks the requisite skill to do so well. Flora is voiced by Mamiko Noto in Japanese and Lani Minella in English.
- Emmeline "Emmy" Altava (レミ・アルタワ, Remi Arutawa; Remi Altava in Japanese version) is Professor Layton's assistant as appointed by the President of Gressenheller University, and one of the main characters of the prequel sequence. She loves photography, taking her camera everywhere she goes, and demonstrates impressive martial arts skills. However, she keeps the circumstances of her past closely guarded, the truth of which would be revealed in Azran Legacy, leading to her departure from the Professor's side. After setting out on her own, she would successfully forge a new path as a roving photographer for the World Times, travelling the world and living "proudly" as a "normal girl". She is 24 years old in Last Specter, and would leave the Professor's company at around 26. The Japanese website for Last Specter also describes her with the phrase "アジア系の美女" (lit. "an Asian beauty" or "an Asian descent beauty"), implying her to be of half-Asian descent.
- Don Paolo (ドン・ポール, Don Pōru), Layton's self-declared nemesis and a recurring antagonist in the original trilogy, is a brilliant scientist, inventor, and master of disguise banished from the scientific community (and the "society of scholars", as noted in The World of Professor Layton) for performing unethical experiments. Originally named Paul, he used to be a fellow student of Layton's at Gressenheller University, and his unrequited love for Layton's then-girlfriend Claire Foley caused his hatred for the professor. When he is not plotting evil, Don Paolo enjoys making and listening to music. Paolo is voiced by Minoru Inaba in Japanese and Christopher Robin Miller in English.
- Jean Descole (ジャン・デスコール, Jan Desukōru), a masked scientist and archaeologist, is a recurring antagonist in the prequel trilogy. In each of his appearances, he competes against Layton, and later with a crooked archaeology organization called Targent, in search of historic sites connected to the ancient civilization of the Azran. Like Don Paolo, he is also a master of disguise and even spends most of Azran Legacy hiding as peaceable archaeologist Desmond Sycamore to deceive Layton. He is secretly Layton's long-lost older brother, who dubbed Layton "Hershel" after his own name when the brothers were adopted by separate families following their father's abduction by Targent. As a result, Descole's ultimate goal is to revenge himself on Targent for destroying his family. His birth name is Hershel Bronev. Descole is voiced by Atsuro Watabe in Japanese and Walter Rego in English. Jonathan Keeble voices him in Eternal Diva.
- Leon Bronev (ブロネフ・レイナー, Buronefu Reinā; Bronev Rainer in the Japanese version) is one of the main antagonists of the prequel trilogy, who leads the evil archeology organization Targent. He seeks to uncover the mysteries of the ancient Azran civilization to harness their untold powers and conquer the world. He is secretly the birth father of Layton and Descole, who were adopted by separate families when he was first captured by Targent, after which he rose through the rankings to become its head. Bronev is voiced by Masachika Ichimura in Japanese and Timothy Watson in English.
- Inspector Chelmey (チェルミー警部, Cherumī Keibu) is a grizzled detective with London's Scotland Yard, reputable for striking fear into the hearts of London criminals, something which belies the reality of his person somewhat. In their various encounters, Layton and Luke have tended to stay one step ahead of the tireless but one-track inspector. When not working, he enjoys his wife's cooking (in the European releases of the games, his favourite food is cakes, while elsewhere it is sweet potato fritters). Chelmey's assistant, a young constable by the name of Barton, is a timid man prone to distraction and making mistakes, but tends to complement Chelmey's investigative style and has covered for some of Chelmey's oversights in the past. His father was once Chelmey's mentor, and by the time of Mystery Room, he had been promoted to Commissioner. Chelmey is voiced by Shirō Saitō in Japanese and Christopher Robin Miller in English.
- Inspector Clamp Grosky (クランプ・グロスキー, Kuranpu Gurosukī) is a police inspector from Scotland Yard who plays a role in the prequels similar to Chelmey's. Emmy and he are well acquainted, having collaborated several times in the past. The energetic Grosky has a fiery passion for mysteries that require his expertise and is also very athletic, apparently able to run faster than cars and swim faster than sharks. His most distinguishing features are his chest hair and his pompadour hairstyle. He also has a younger sister named Amelie who goes on to marry Chelmey, making Chelmey brother-in-law to Grosky. Grosky is voiced by Hōchū Ōtsuka. Stuart Organ voices him in Eternal Diva.
- Inspector Ercule Hastings (ダージリン・アスポイロ, Dājirin Asupowaro; Darjeeling Aspoirot in Japanese version) is a hardworking, down-to-earth detective at Scotland Yard who frequently enlists the assistance of Katrielle and her Agency in his more puzzling investigations. His colleague Emiliana Perfetti, a police profiler, is a perennial critic and avowed rival of Kat, and is highly competitive with her when the two cross paths.
- Granny Riddleton (ナゾーバ, Nazōba), self-described clairvoyant, is a recurring character throughout the entire series, first appearing chronologically in a cameo in Last Specter. Many characters view her as a witch, presumably due to her pointed hat and distinctive laugh. She gathers all the puzzles missed by the Professor and co. as they progress through their investigations, storing them in a small hut so they may be solved later. In the prequel games where she does not perform her regular function, Riddleton's pet cat, Keats, appears in her place while she holidays. In Miracle Mask, however, she appears wearing thick eyeglasses and calls herself "Nana Grams" (a portmanteau of "nana" and "anagrams")/"Elizabeth". In Unwound Future, she retires, and is soon succeeded, after a brief intermediary period where she is supplemented by a talking bee named Beasley, by her granddaughter, Puzzlette. Riddleton is seen enjoying her retired life in Millionaires' Conspiracy.
- Stachenscarfen (ヒゲマフラー Hige mafurā), so named in reference to his distinctive facial hair and scarf, is a recurring "fourth wall" comic relief character throughout the entire series. His first appearance is in Curious Village where he is an apparent resident of St. Mystere. His purpose is to explain tutorials to the player; however he is presented as a mysterious, enigmatic character who "appears out of nowhere" and "vanishes without a trace", and has motivations that are shrouded in mystery, playing the role of a humorous metatextual jab at characters who exist for no reason other than to hand out tutorials. In the prequel sequence, he is replaced most of the time by a similarly-mustached character named Aldus. In Azran Legacy, his only appearance in the prequel games, he is directly described as an ominous character who has knowledge beyond the other characters, a reference to his role in the original trilogy, while an elderly Stachenscarfen appears in Millionaires' Conspiracy.
- Claire Foley (クレア・フォーリー, Kurea Fōrī) she was the partner of Hershel Layton and served as a laboratory assistant to Bill Hawks and Dimitri Allen. Described as a sweet and enthusiastic 25-year-old, she appears in the game Professor Layton And The Lost Future.

=== Plot ===
Each series of games and media feature narrative threads connecting the stories together, but only the prequel sequence of Last Specter, Eternal Diva, Miracle Mask and Azran Legacy features a plot-important arc. Other games and media do not have any overarching structure, but do follow a chronological order by way of the appearance and development of recurring characters.

==== Original sequence ====
- Professor Layton and the Curious Village: Professor Hershel Layton and his young apprentice Luke Triton are invited to the remote village of St. Mystere by the family of late Baron Augustus Reinhold to figure out the secret behind his last will and testament, in which he stated that anyone who found the Golden Apple hidden within the town would be entitled to his entire fortune. Upon entering the town, the duo soon discover that the curious village holds many more secrets than they could ever have expected. They encounter 135 puzzles in their pursuit of the truth behind St. Mystere.
- Professor Layton and the Diabolical Box: The Professor and Luke receive a letter from Layton's old mentor, Dr. Schrader, detailing his procuring of the Elysian Box, a chest rumored to kill anyone who tries to open it. Fearing for his safety, the pair visit Schrader's apartment, where they find him lying on the floor, dead, with the box nowhere to be found. Their only clue to the box's whereabouts is a train ticket for the high-class Molentary Express with no discernible destination, setting the duo on a journey in search of the truth behind the fate of Dr. Schrader and the whereabouts of his diabolical box. During their search, they are faced with 153 additional puzzles.
- Professor Layton and the Unwound Future: Considering the provenance of a letter purportedly sent to the Professor by Luke himself, from ten years into the future, only a week after an accident in which Dr. Stahngun's failed demonstration of a time machine caused both the scientist and Britain's Prime Minister to vanish, Luke and Layton travel to a desolate part of town as directed to investigate a clock shop. Upon walking out, they find themselves thrust forward into a Future London, ten years from their present. The pair are challenged to solve 168 new puzzles in their efforts to find the truth of their lost future, and to remember a forgotten past.

==== Prequel sequence ====
- Professor Layton and the Last Specter: Receiving a letter in the name of Clark Triton, an old friend, Layton is called to the mysterious, foggy town of Misthallery, where legends exist of a great, shadowy giant who protects the region whenever a special flute is played to summon it. Recently, however, the "specter" has seemingly turned against the village, becoming violent and destructive, and it is up to the Professor, a young boy of the village named Luke who can predict its appearance, and Layton's new assistant, Emmy Altava, to figure out why. Together, they investigate the incidents and unearth the town's history, confronted throughout by a body of 170 puzzles.
- Professor Layton and the Eternal Diva: Layton is contacted by an old pupil who believes her late friend has been reincarnated in the form of a young girl. With Luke and Emmy in tow, the trio find themselves drawn into a conspiracy concerning a race to uncover the secret to eternal life.
- Professor Layton and the Miracle Mask: Layton, Luke, and Emmy travel to the city of Monte d'Or in search of clues to the meaning behind the sudden appearance of the Masked Gentleman, a mysterious figure who has wrought chaos upon the city with so-called "miracles", attributed to the seemingly magical powers of a mask. The Professor is forced to recall his past in order to uncover the secret of the mask in the present, as their task is tested by 150 puzzles.
- Professor Layton and the Azran Legacy: Contacted by a fellow archaeologist who claims to have found a "living mummy", the Professor, Luke and Emmy find themselves drawn into a face-off against an organisation known as Targent, who are in search of the relics of an ancient civilisation possessed of powers far beyond anything seen in the present. In their travels, they are offered a clutch of 165 puzzles.

==== New Layton series ====
- Layton Brothers: Mystery Room: Alfendi Layton, son of Professor Layton, and his newly assigned assistant, Lucy Baker, form a crime-solving duo based at Scotland Yard, solving cases other detectives are unable to crack.
- Layton's Mystery Journey: Katrielle and the Millionaires' Conspiracy: A new protagonist, Katrielle Layton, opens the Layton Detective Agency with the help of her assistant, Ernest, and takes on client-in-residence Sherl as her first step into the mystery-solving profession, assisting her fellow Londoners in solving puzzles while becoming embroiled in the affairs of a ring of seven London moguls.
- Layton Mystery Tanteisha: Katori no Nazotoki File: Pursuing her mission of solving any mystery, no matter how strange, Katrielle and her two companions uncover clues as to the truth behind the Professor's decade-long disappearance.

==== Upcoming ====
- Professor Layton and the New World of Steam: One year after they first parted ways, Layton reunites with Luke in the American city of Steam Bison to investigate a new mystery.

==== Crossover ====
- Professor Layton vs. Phoenix Wright: Ace Attorney: The Professor, Luke, Phoenix Wright, and Maya Fey find themselves in a medieval world separate from their own, known as Labyrinthia. This world is controlled by a man known as the Storyteller, who can make anything he writes down a reality, and tales abound of witches who hide in the shadows. Whilst there their exploits expose them to a set of 70 puzzles.

== Other media ==
=== Anime ===
==== Feature film ====
As part of the "second series" of the franchise, a feature-length anime film directed by Masakazu Hashimoto, titled Professor Layton and the Eternal Diva, was released in Japanese theaters on December 19, 2009. Produced by P.A. Works, the company responsible for the animated cutscenes in the original six games, it contains an original story which takes place between the events of Last Specter and Miracle Mask chronologically. The film was a general success in both Japan and Singapore, where it also received a cinema run. Manga Entertainment released a full English dub of the film on home video in the United Kingdom on October 18, 2010, which Viz Media republished in North America on November 8, 2011. A second film was initially planned for release between the fifth and sixth instalments, but failed to materialise.

==== TV series ====
An anime television series, titled Layton Mystery Tanteisha: Katori no Nazotoki File, starring the characters of Layton's Mystery Journey: Katrielle and the Millionaires' Conspiracy and featuring the original two series protagonists, began airing in Japan on April 8, 2018. The series was directed by Susumu Mitsunaka at Liden Films, with creative direction and series composition by Akihiro Hino and character design by Yoko Takada, and consists of 50 episodes.

=== Manga ===
Humour manga intended for child audiences was serialized beginning in February 2008 in the special edition of Bessatsu CoroCoro Comic. The manga, titled Professor Layton and the Cheerful Mystery (レイトン教授とユカイな事件, Reiton-kyōju to yukai na jiken), covers many mysteries in the story. Several chapters are based on the games; most of the others are original stories with little relation to the game canon. The chapters also included puzzles for the readers to solve. The complete series was collected into four volumes, released between November 2008 and June 2012. Tokyopop has released all four volumes in German under the name Professor Layton und seine lustigen Fälle. The series has also been released in Spanish under the name El Professor Layton y sus Divertidos Misterios by Norma Editorial, in French as Professeur Layton et l'étrange enquête by Kazé Manga and in Italian as Il professor Layton e i misteri buffi by Planet Manga.

=== Novels ===
Three books based on the Professor Layton series were also published, though they have only been made available in Japan. They consist of Professor Layton and the Wandering Castle (レイトン教授とさまよえる城, Reiton Kyōju to Samayoeru Shiro) in 2008, Professor Layton and the Phantom Deity (レイトン教授と怪人ゴッド, Reiton kyōju to Kaijin Goddo) in 2009, and Professor Layton and the Illusory Forest (レイトン教授と幻影の森, Reiton kyōju to Genei no Mori) in 2010.

=== Experiential events ===
The Professor Layton series has been the subject of several playable experiences and live events, featuring standalone scenarios involving characters such as the Professor and Katrielle.

== Reception ==
Game	Metacritic	GameRankings
Professor Layton and the Curious Village	85	86%
Professor Layton and the Diabolical Box/Pandora's Box	84	85%
Professor Layton and the Unwound Future/Lost Future	86	87%
Professor Layton and the Last Specter/Spectre's Call	83	84%
Professor Layton and the Miracle Mask	82	83%
Layton Brothers: Mystery Room	75	76%
Professor Layton and the Azran Legacy	81	82%
Layton's Mystery Journey: Katrielle and the Millionaires' Conspiracy	72	70%

The Professor Layton series has been generally successful in the UK, the US, and Japan. Professor Layton and the Curious Village sold over 700,000 units in Japan in 2007. The game was also the top selling game for the Nintendo DS in the United States in the first three weeks after its release. After it was restocked in the UK, sales of Professor Layton increased 54%, moving it from 10th place to fourth place.

Curious Village received generally positive reviews from critics. On the review aggregator Game Rankings, the game had an average score of 86% based on 48 reviews. On Metacritic, the game had an average score of 85/100, based on 57 reviews. The combination of the adventure game and "brain training" genres received mixed appreciation. Some reviewers praised the game for the successful combination with 1UP commenting on how the game's approach is much better than games where the puzzles were integrated into the environment. Other reviewers felt that these two genres do not merge well within the game; Game Informer noted that while the player is given numerous small puzzles to solve, the mysteries of the main plot are basically solved for the player. The game was noted to have little replay value; once all the puzzles were solved, there was no point in playing through them again. The presentation of the game, including both the general European art style and cutscene animations, was appreciated by reviewers. Hyper's Darren Wells commends the game for its "clever concept, with plenty to solve and unlock as well as its fantastic presentation". However, he criticizes "some puzzles feeling tacked on and the music can get annoying".

Professor Layton and the Diabolical Box was considered to be a major improvement from the original. According to Famitsu, the game had sold 815,369 copies in Japan as of July 9, 2008. The UK's Official Nintendo Magazine awarded the game a score of 92% (and consequently their Gold Award medal), praising the increased number of puzzles, animated scenes and voice acting, but complained that it could be slightly repetitive at times. IGN gave the game a score of 8.5 and also their Editor's Choice Award.

The series was popular enough to inspire a feature-length movie called Professor Layton and the Eternal Diva. It has been released in Japan, Singapore, France, Germany, the UK, Spain, the US, and Canada. It received primarily positive reviews and is considered one of the better video game adaptations into film. It was released in the UK on the 18th of October, with a full English dub.

Nintendo Power listed series mascot Professor Layton as their 10th favorite hero, citing his use of brains over brawn.

The series went on to become one of the most successful Nintendo DS exclusive series, with the lifetime cumulative sales of the first four Professor Layton games standing at 10 million units sold in October 2010, and 11.47 million unit sales worldwide for the franchise ahead of the release of Professor Layton and the Miracle Mask in February 2011. Later announcements expanded the figure to over 13 million copies sold in March 2012, 15 million unit sales in August 2013, making it the company's best-selling game franchise, and over 17 million shipments by June 2018.
