= Professor Layton and the Curious Village =

2007 Japanese puzzle video game

- North American box art
- Developer: Level-5
- Publishers: Nintendo DS; JP: Level-5; WW: Nintendo iOS, Android; WW: Level-5
- Director: Tatsuya Shinkai
- Producer: Akihiro Hino
- Designers: Akihiro Hino; Akira Tago
- Artist: Takuzo Nagano
- Writers: Akihiro Hino; Noriko Ikeura; Kazuya Kuranari
- Composer: Tomohito Nishiura
- Series: Professor Layton
- Platforms: Nintendo DS, mobile, iOS, Android
- Release: February 15, 2007: Nintendo DS; JP: February 15, 2007; NA: February 10, 2008; AU: April 10, 2008; KO: September 11, 2008; EU: November 7, 2008 Mobile phone; JP: May 27, 2008 iOS, Android; JP: June 8, 2018; WW: September 25, 2018
- Genres: Puzzle, adventure
- Mode: Single-player

Professor Layton and the Curious Village (Note: Known in Japan as Reiton-kyōju to Fushigi na Machi (Japanese: レイトン教授と不思議な町; lit. "Professor Layton and the Mysterious Town")) is a puzzle adventure video game for the Nintendo DS system. It was developed and published by Level-5 in Japan and published by Nintendo worldwide. It was released in Japan in 2007 and worldwide the following year. It was re-released in Australia using the British English localisation and European artwork to replace the previously released North American localisation. Curious Village is the first game in the Professor Layton series, followed by Professor Layton and the Diabolical Box. An enhanced mobile port of Curious Village featuring additional cutscenes, subtitled "HD for Mobile", was released in 2018.

The game centers on Professor Hershel Layton, and his self-styled apprentice, Luke Triton, investigating the fictional village of St. Mystere about an artifact known as the Golden Apple, an heirloom that the late Baron had left as a test to determine who would receive his fortune after his death. The residents of St. Mystere particularly enjoy brain teasers and will often ask the player to help solve them by using the system's touchscreen to submit answers in exchange for their cooperation in the search.

It received generally positive reviews, praising both its approach to combining the adventure and puzzle genres, as well as for its presentation and animated cutscenes. It sold over a million copies in Japan alone, in addition to 3.17 million copies sold worldwide. A remake is currently in development and will be released in 2027.

== Gameplay ==
An early puzzle in Professor Layton and the Curious Village. The puzzle is solved via input on the bottom screen, while the instructions are on the top.

The Curious Village is an adventure-puzzle game. The player controls the movements of Professor Hershel Layton (voiced by Christopher Robin Miller) and his young assistant Luke (voiced by Lani Minella in US English and Maria Darling in UK English) around the village of St. Mystere to locate the "Golden Apple" and solve other mysteries that arise during their search. St. Mystere is divided into several sections, some of which are inaccessible until the story has advanced to a certain point or the player solves a certain number of puzzles. The player can talk to characters or investigate objects on screen by tapping them. Characters will also ask Layton and Luke to try to solve puzzles; there are also hidden puzzles that can be found by investigating certain objects. As the story progresses, if an unsolved puzzle can no longer be accessed (for example, if the person offering it has departed), it will reappear at Granny Riddleton's Puzzle Shack at the plaza, midway through the game.

Puzzles include brain teasers, sliding puzzles, logic puzzles, and others. The player is presented with each puzzle and its value in "picarats", and is given an unlimited amount of time to solve it. Each puzzle has three hints available for it, but the player must spend one "hint coin" to see each hint. Hint coins are limited; the player starts with ten, and more can be found by examining suspicious objects around the village. Once the player feels they have the answer to a puzzle, depending on the puzzle, they might enter it by selecting an answer, drawing a circle around a specific area, or entering the answer by inputting letters or numbers into the DS's touchscreen. If the player is correct, the picarats are added to their total score, and they are sometimes rewarded with an item. If the player is incorrect, they can retry the puzzle indefinitely, though the first two times they are wrong, the value of the puzzle will decrease by approximately 10% each time (or more, in the case of multiple-choice puzzles). There are also puzzles in which the player must make a sequence of moves in order to reach some final state, and cannot submit an incorrect answer. A player can quit a puzzle at no cost and try another, though certain puzzles are mandatory to progress. Once a puzzle is completed, the player may retry it at any time via the game's menu.

As a reward for completing a puzzle, the player may earn one of three rewards: machine parts known as "gizmos", furniture, or portrait pieces, to be used in their respective minigames accessible through the professor's trunk. Gizmos can be attached to assemble a robotic dog with the ability to sniff out hidden hint coins and puzzles. Pieces of furniture can be placed within Layton's and Luke's rooms at the local inn, arranging them in such a way as to make both of them completely happy with their rooms. Pieces of a portrait are assembled like a jigsaw puzzle, revealing a picture once fully assembled. By completing all 120 puzzles in the main game and each of these three minigames, the player can access up to 15 bonus puzzles from the main menu. The game is also compatible with Nintendo Wi-Fi Connection, which allows players to connect to the internet and unlock over 25 new puzzles in the game. The first unlockable puzzle was made available on the day of the game's release, and new puzzles were released weekly for half a year, every Sunday. After May 20, 2014, it is impossible to download the additional content, as the Nintendo Wi-Fi Connection service was terminated on that date.

Also found within the bonus features is a "Hidden Door", which can be opened by inputting a code found in a similar menu within the sequel, Professor Layton and the Diabolical Box. After opening, the door can be clicked to reveal concept art of various characters within the game.

A playable demo of The Curious Village was playable on its official website until Adobe removed support for Adobe Flash Player.

== Plot ==
The order of events will vary depending on choices that the player has made, but the overall plot remains unchanged.

The game opens with archaeologist Hershel Layton and his young assistant Luke driving to the town of St. Mystere, summoned by a letter from Lady Dahlia, widow of Baron Augustus Reinhold. The Baron stated in his last will and testament that whoever solves the mystery of the Golden Apple will inherit his fortune, and several people have attempted and failed. The two enter the town and find that most of the population is fond of puzzles and brain teasers, which Layton and Luke are adept at solving. They see a large, haphazard tower that occupies one side of town that no one can get to; people hear strange noises emanating from it at night. Layton and Luke meet Lady Dahlia and other family members, including Simon, Gordon, and the family servants. Before they can discuss the mystery further, a loud exploding sound is heard and Dahlia's cat flees out of the door. Layton and Luke retrieve the cat and, upon returning to the mansion, discover that Simon has been murdered and the case is already under investigation by Inspector Chelmey, a renowned detective. Chelmey initially suspects the two, but then tells them to stay out of the investigation. However, Matthew, the butler of the Baron's mansion, tells Layton about a small gearwheel that he found in the room near Simon's body.

A still from a cutscene within Professor Layton and the Curious Village. Cutscenes in the Professor Layton series are fully animated.

As Layton and Luke continue their search for the Golden Apple, they witness the kidnapping of one of Dahlia's servants, Ramon. A strange man stuffs Ramon into a bag; they give chase but are unable to catch him, though they do find another gearwheel similar to the one before. However, they are befuddled as Ramon is back the next day as if nothing had happened. They continue to explore the town, and check the looming tower that everyone had been telling them to stay away from but are eventually led to the town's abandoned amusement park by a young girl. As they explore the Ferris wheel, a sinister figure uses a remote to tear the wheel from its moorings, sending it rolling after Layton and Luke. They barely escape as the wheel smashes through a locked building. Exploring the wreckage, they find a key shaped similarly to the tower, and Layton gets an idea of what's going on in the village. The two return to face Chelmey, who Layton realizes is an impostor. The man reveals himself as Layton's self-proclaimed arch-enemy, Don Paolo, who is seeking the Golden Apple for himself and who tried to use the Ferris wheel to knock Layton out of the picture. Paolo escapes before Layton can capture him. Luke asks the professor who Don Paolo is and why he wants revenge. Layton knows Don Paolo's reputation as an evil scientific genius but has no idea why Don Paolo hates him, implying that the two have never met before.

With Luke in tow, Layton heads for the tower, using the key to unlock a secret wall in a dead end. Inside, they discover the man that previously had kidnapped Ramon, who is named Bruno. With Bruno's help, Layton discovers the truth: all the residents of St. Mystere are robots, created by the Baron and Bruno to challenge the wits of anyone seeking the Golden Apple, hence their shared obsession with puzzles. Simon has not died, only malfunctioned; similarly, Bruno collected Ramon in order to perform repairs. Having solved the puzzle of St. Mystere, Layton and Luke climb the tower, solving more puzzles and meeting minor characters along the way. Eventually, the pair reaches the top of the tower, and much to their surprise, find a beautifully kept cottage there. Inside, the young girl from before awaits. She reveals herself as Flora Reinhold, the only daughter of the Baron. She is the "Golden Apple" that the robots were protecting until she became an adult.

Layton's triumph is short-lived as Don Paolo returns in a flying machine and starts demolishing the tower. Luke escapes down the stairs, but Layton is forced to improvise a glider to take Flora and himself to safety as the tower collapses. Don Paolo, with his machine malfunctioning, drops a bag containing the stolen Simon. The villain swears revenge and leaves, and the three reach the town safely. As Flora hugs the Professor and laughs, an apple-like birthmark can be seen on her shoulder. As they regroup at the Reinhold manor, Layton realizes that there is more to the treasure than just Flora, as the birthmark points to the Baron's riches. Luke finds a switch on the portrait of Flora in the same location as her birthmark which leads to a secret room filled with gold.

A voice recording from the Baron, intended for those who solved the mystery, congratulates Layton. The voice tells Flora to take the treasure, explaining that if it is taken, all the robots will stop functioning. Flora opts to leave it as a way to repay the robots for their services in protecting her and her new friends. As the game ends, Layton, Luke, and Flora leave St. Mystere without the treasure, allowing the residents to continue on with their lives. The three (and other characters) are shown laughing and living together during the game credits.

As the first part of a trilogy, the main story ends with a "to be continued" message with a picture of Luke and Layton at a train station, hinting at the plot of Professor Layton and the Diabolical Box.

== Development ==
Development started in 2006, with Level-5 President and CEO Akihiro Hino intending to make a trilogy of video games based on Atama no Taisou, a series of puzzle books he loved in his childhood, which were written by Chiba University Professor Akira Tago. Level-5 worked directly with Tago to adapt puzzles from his books, which were all modified to support the DS stylus and touchscreen. Tago headed the puzzle team, and contributed 30 new puzzles to the game, developed specifically with the capabilities of the Nintendo DS in mind.

Level-5 refused the Atama no Taisou name to avoid copyright infringement. Hino wanted a story with two intelligent characters who could bounce ideas off each other, inspired by Sherlock Holmes and Dr. Watson, and had one of his artists draw an English gentleman and a younger character, whom Hino temporarily named Professor Layton and Luke, respectively, until the names stuck. Hino was in charge of project planning, the main scenario, and overall game design. The game features animated cutscenes produced by P.A. Works. The advertising budget was around 700 million yen.

== Audio ==
The game's soundtrack was composed by Tomohito Nishiura, with a French-styled influence in mind. An album titled Layton Kyouju to Fushigi na Machi Original Soundtrack was released in Japan only, containing all the music featured in the game. The album received mixed reviews from online sites. Square Enix Music Online gave the album 6 out of 10, calling it "a rather bland collection of repetitive and similar music tracks from the game." RPGFan Music similarly stated "...the soundtrack is simply too repetitive to be considered anything fantastic."

Professor Layton and the Curious Village Official Soundtrack
No.	Title	Length
1.	"Professor Layton's Theme"	2:10
2.	"The Adventure Begins"	0:29
3.	"St. Mystere"	2:59
4.	"About Town"	3:10
5.	"Puzzles"	1:53
6.	"Baron Reinhold"	2:44
7.	"The Plot Thickens"	2:10
8.	"Down the Tubes"	3:22
9.	"The Veil of Night"	3:55
10.	"Crumm's Cafe"	1:45
11.	"Pursuit in the Night"	2:27
12.	"The Mysterious Girl"	3:56
13.	"Deserted Amusement Park"	2:46
14.	"The Great Don Paolo"	3:14
15.	"The Village Awakens"	1:45
16.	"The Looming Tower"	4:58
17.	"Memories of St. Mystere"	3:07
18.	"Setting Out"	1:31
19.	"End Theme"	2:56
20.	"Professor Layton's Theme (Live Version)"	3:36
21.	"The Veil of Night (Live Version)"	5:30
22.	"The Looming Tower (Live Version)"	4:42
23.	"End Theme (Live Version)"	2:51
24.	"About Town (High Quality)"	3:16
25.	"Baron Reinhold (High Quality)"	2:44
26.	"The Village Awakens (High Quality)"	1:47
Total length:		75:48

== Reception ==
Reception

Aggregate score
Aggregator	Score
Metacritic	85/100

Review scores
Publication	Score
1Up.com	A−
Adventure Gamers	4.5/5
The A.V. Club	A−
Destructoid	8.7/10
Edge	7/10
Electronic Gaming Monthly	8.83/10
Eurogamer	9/10
Game Informer	7.5/10
GamePro	3.75/5
GameRevolution	B−
GameSpot	9/10
GameSpy	4.5/5
GameTrailers	9/10
GameZone	9/10
Giant Bomb	5/5
IGN	(AU & UK) 8.5/10 (US) 8/10
Nintendo Life	9/10
Nintendo Power	8.5/10
Nintendo World Report	8/10
Official Nintendo Magazine	92%
The Daily Telegraph	8/10
USA Today	5/5

The Curious Village received "favorable" reviews according to video game review aggregator website Metacritic. The combination of the adventure game and "brain training" genres received mixed appreciation. Some reviewers praised the game for the successful combination with 1UP.com commenting on how the game's approach is much better than games where the puzzles were integrated into the environment. Other reviewers felt that these two genres do not merge well within the game; Game Informer noted that while the player is given numerous small puzzles to solve, the mysteries of the main plot are basically solved for the player. The game was noted to have little replay value; once all the puzzles were solved, there was no point in playing through them again. The presentation of the game, including both the general European animation style and cutscene animations, was appreciated by reviewers. Hyper's Darren Wells commended the game for its "clever concept, with plenty to solve and unlock as well as its fantastic presentation". However, he criticized "some puzzles feeling tacked on and the music can get annoying". Edge gave it a score of seven out of ten, saying, "There are lots of puzzles, a fun environment to tootle around in, and little to dislike. Utterly charming." Nintendo Power listed the ending as one of the best on a Nintendo console, citing the many discoveries that players find in the end credits. In Japan, Famitsu gave the game a score of three eights and one nine, for a total of 33 out of 40.

USA Today gave the game all ten stars, saying, "While children as young as age 8 will enjoy the mystery, some of the puzzles will be too hard because they require advanced math concepts. The sweet spot for this software is kids ages 12 and up, including adults." The A.V. Club gave it an A−, calling it "a top-notch package that'll make you love puzzles as much as the game's designers." The Daily Telegraph gave it an eight out of ten, calling it "a delightful game, and an excellent addition to the DS's library. Suitable, as they say, for children of any age, it's gripping enough to keep you playing for just that one more puzzle. Bring on the sequel, I say." In 2009, Official Nintendo Magazine called the game "Beautiful, innovative and inclusive", ranking the game 65th on a list of greatest Nintendo games.

The Curious Village sold over 700,000 units in Japan in 2007. The game was the top selling game for the Nintendo DS in the United States in the first three weeks after its release. After it was restocked in the UK, sales of Professor Layton increased 54%, moving it from 10th place to fourth place. The game received a "Platinum" sales award from the Entertainment and Leisure Software Publishers Association (ELSPA), indicating sales of at least 300,000 copies in the United Kingdom.

=== Awards ===
Professor Layton and the Curious Village was awarded the Best Handheld Game award in the 2008 Spike Video Game Awards, Best Nintendo DS Game of 2008 by GameSpy, and the tenth best game overall of 2008 by GameSpy. In March 2009 it was awarded Best Handheld Award at the British Academy Video Games Awards. It was also nominated for Best Puzzle Game on the Nintendo DS in IGN's 2008 video game awards, and for the British Academy Children's Award for Video Game in 2008. It won Best DS Game of 2008 on Giant Bomb, and fifteenth game of 2008 overall by Eurogamer. It also won the "Best Puzzle Game Of The Year" award in the Nintendo Power magazine. In February 2009, Professor Layton and the Curious Village was awarded the Aggie for Best Console/Handheld Adventure in the first award presentation by Adventure Gamers. It was also nominated for Best Handheld Game on G4's G-phoria in 2008. During the 12th Annual Interactive Achievement Awards, the Academy of Interactive Arts & Sciences nominated Professor Layton and the Curious Village for "Hand-Held Game of the Year", "Casual Game of the Year", and "Outstanding Achievement in Original Story".

In 2011, Adventure Gamers named Professor Layton the 47th-best adventure game ever released.
