= Professor Layton and the Diabolical Box =

2007 Japanese puzzle video game

- North American box art
- Developers: Level-5; Matrix Software (iOS, Android)
- Publishers: Nintendo DS: JP: Level-5; WW: Nintendo; iOS, Android: WW: Level-5
- Director: Tatsuya Shinkai
- Producer: Akihiro Hino
- Composer: Tomohito Nishiura
- Series: Professor Layton
- Platforms: Nintendo DS, iOS, Android
- Release: Nintendo DS: JP: November 29, 2007; NA: August 24, 2009; AU: September 24, 2009; EU: September 25, 2009; KO: September 8, 2011; iOS, Android: JP: December 5, 2018; NA/EU: June 20, 2019
- Genres: Puzzle, Adventure
- Mode: Single-player

Professor Layton and the Diabolical Box, (Note: Known in Japan as Reiton-kyōju to Akuma no Hako (レイトン教授と悪魔の箱; lit. Professor Layton and the Devil's Box)) known in Australia and Europe as Professor Layton and Pandora's Box, is the second game in the Professor Layton series by Level-5. It was followed by a third game, Professor Layton and the Unwound Future. The game follows Professor Layton and his self-proclaimed apprentice Luke as they travel cross-country by train to solve the mystery behind a mysterious box that is said to kill anyone who opens it. An enhanced mobile port of Diabolical Box, subtitled "HD for Mobile", was released on December 5, 2018.

== Gameplay ==
An early puzzle in Professor Layton and the Diabolical Box. The puzzle is solved via input on the bottom screen, while the instructions are on the top.

Professor Layton and the Diabolical Box is an adventure/puzzle game. The player controls the movements of the eponymous Professor Layton and his young assistant Luke through several locations, unlike in the previous game which is confined to just one town. Along with completing many different types of puzzles, players must explore different areas, solve mysteries, and aid the Professor on his quest.

The puzzle menus for this game are very similar to those in Curious Village. Puzzles include brain teasers, sliding puzzles, logic puzzles and others. The player is presented with each puzzle and its value in "picarats", and is given unlimited time to solve it. Each puzzle has three hints available for it, but the player must spend one "hint coin" to see each hint. Hint coins are limited; the player starts with ten, and more can be found by searching the game's locales. Once the player feels they have the answer, they enter it, either by selecting an answer, drawing a circle around a specific part, or entering the answer through character recognition on the Nintendo DS's touchscreen. If the player is correct, the picarats are added to their total score, and they are sometimes rewarded with an item. If the player is incorrect, they can retry the puzzle indefinitely, though the first two times they are wrong, the value of the puzzle will decrease by approximately ten percent each time. Optionally, a player can quit a puzzle at no cost and try another, though certain puzzles are mandatory to progress. Once a puzzle is completed, the player may retry it at any time via the game's menus.

As a reward for completing a puzzle, the player may earn one of three categories of item. Hamster toys are collected to help Luke give a morbidly obese hamster a workout; pieces of a shattered camera that Sammy accidentally dropped can be assembled to repair it; and players can earn tea ingredients to brew new recipes and serve cups of tea to Luke, Layton and people they meet.

By completing all 138 puzzles in the main game and each of these additional puzzles, the player could access 15 bonus puzzles for 153 puzzles total (excluding the downloadable puzzles). The game was compatible with Nintendo Wi-Fi Connection, allowing players to connect to the internet and download new weekly puzzles. The first unlockable puzzle was made available on the day of the game's Japanese release, and one new key had been released every week thereafter for 33 weeks, with new keys being released on Sunday. Since May 20, 2014, it has been impossible to download the additional content, since the Nintendo Wi-Fi Connection service was terminated on that date.

There are also two bonuses in "The Hidden Door" that are only available after the player finds one unique code each in the game's predecessor and sequel. Other bonuses include a soundtrack, cut-scenes, soundbites, character profiles, and scenes from the game.

== Plot ==
Dr. Schrader, Professor Layton's mentor, reportedly has come across the mysterious Elysian Box, fabled to kill anyone who opens it. When Layton and Luke pay Dr. Schrader a visit, they find him unconscious on the floor and no sign of the box. A train ticket for the Molentary Express is the only clue of the box's theft, and the two prepare to follow on the next train out to head towards the town of Folsense, listed in Schrader's diary as the origin of the Elysian Box. They are followed by Inspector Chelmey, tracking down the crime, and Flora, who sneaks aboard the train but is eventually discovered by the pair.

The train makes a stop in Dropstone, a town celebrating the fiftieth anniversary of its founding. As they enjoy the celebration, Layton and Luke learn that the town's founder, Sophia, also had an interest in the Elysian Box, but she died the year before, and her granddaughter Katia continues to seek it out. Don Paolo, Layton's arch-rival, kidnaps Flora and disguises himself as her, leaving her behind in Dropstone as the train departs.

En route to Folsense, Layton, Luke, and "Flora" are knocked out with sleeping gas by the train's conductor. They awake to find that their train car had been switched with another engine going to Folsense station. As they enter the town, they are struck by a brief wave of nausea, and "Flora" feigns illness to stay at the hotel. Layton and Luke explore the town and learn it was founded on top of rich mine deposits by Duke Herzen and his sons, Anton and Fredrich. Some fifty years ago, upon discovery of a new vein of gold, strange incidents began to occur around town, and many of its citizens left. Fredrich left with his part of the family fortune and founding the Molentary Express, changing his name to hide his identity. They also learn that Dropstone's founder Sophia was also a former resident, evacuating with several of the citizens to form the nearby village. The remaining citizens point to the central castle over the mines, where they claim that Anton remains to this day as a vampire.

On returning to the hotel, Layton and Luke find that the remainder of the train's contingent has arrived, and Chelmey has arrested a conductor named Sammy as a suspect in the theft of the box and Schrader's death. Layton proves him wrong, revealing Don Paolo after exposing his disguise. Don Paolo escapes but leaves behind the Elysian Box. Layton and Luke open it but find the box is completely empty, so Layton eventually suggests visiting Anton to solve the mystery.

At the castle, the surprisingly young Anton initially welcomes them as his guests, but when they start to ask about the Elysian Box, he becomes suspicious and at one point ties the pair up, though they are able to escape. During the escape, the pair find a large hole in the basement of the castle, along with some strange machinery. Layton discovers the mine, which is connected to the castle basement, but finds the effects of the nausea worsen as they get closer to it. In spite of this, the two return to Anton and find Katia along the way. Upon mistaking her for Sophia, Anton challenges Layton to a fencing duel. Anton eventually tires from the duel: this leads Katia to break it up, revealing Anton to be her grandfather in the process. She also tells everyone that her grandmother left Folsense to protect her and Anton's unborn child (who would grow up to be Katia's mother) and that Sophia and this child had died some time ago. Unfortunately, Anton lashes out with his saber in rage and disbelief, cutting a chain holding the chandelier in place and causing the castle to collapse. Everyone makes it out in time before the building falls into the mine, caving in the exposed mine shaft in the basement. Layton explains that when the mine was discovered fifty years ago, it released a hallucinatory gas that affected everyone in Folsense; as the gas disperses, Anton is revealed to be an old man, and Folsense an abandoned, desolate town. Layton suspects a quantity of the gas was in the Elysian Box, causing those that believed in the myth to actually succumb to death.

Anton is suddenly reminded of his fiancée, Sophia, and that he has commissioned the box to hold a message to be sent to Sophia in Dropstone after her departure, but it had been stolen so many times he had lost hope Sophia received it. Luke opens the special compartment and reveals that Sophia had gotten the box and left her own note to Anton, stating her love for him and Katia's relationship to her. Anton welcomes Katia with open arms, wanting to love her as much as he had Sophia, stating that he has to get to know Katia before he can join Sophia in death. The group returns to Dropstone, where Flora is located. As Layton and his friends return to London, they learn that Dr. Schrader had only fallen into a temporary coma from his exposure to the gas from the box, and has now fully recovered.

After the credits, the game ends showing "to be continued" along with a picture of Layton and Luke standing in front of a time machine, alluding to the premise of Professor Layton and the Unwound Future.

== Development ==
The Professor Layton series was announced to be a trilogy immediately following the announcement of Professor Layton and the Curious Village within Japan. By this time, Level-5 had already decided upon the Japanese names of Curious Village and Professor Layton and the Unwound Future, but were originally planning to entitle the second game "Layton-kyōju to Yū-rei Jima no Himitsu". (ゆうれい島のひみつ, – Yū-rei Jima no Himitsu; lit. "Professor Layton and the Secret of Ghost Island") These plans were eventually cancelled due to the staff thinking that it was too strange for an English gentleman to try and survive on a desert island, and the story was changed to that of Diabolical Box.

Level-5 learned several lessons from the critical response to Curious Village. Critics had often claimed that the puzzles in the games were too disjointed from the game's plot, so in Diabolical Box, they attempted to make the puzzles more relevant to the game's narrative. The puzzles within the series from Diabolical Box onward tended to use English more than Japanese. This was coincidental, but allowed the game to be translated without replacing as many puzzles. Level-5 also tried to update existing systems within the game, such as the Professor's suitcase and minigames; ultimately, Diabolical Box used up nearly twice as much data than its predecessor.

== Audio ==
The music of the game was composed by Tomohito Nishiura with the entire soundtrack later released on an album titled Layton Kyouju to Akuma no Hako Original Soundtrack, in Japan only. The puzzle theme is similar to the original but with additional percussion. The ending theme song "Iris" was sung by Salyu, though it was omitted from the album. The international release of the game utilizes an instrumental version, though it similarly was not included on the album either due to not have being created at the time.

The album scored slightly higher than its predecessor. Square Enix Music Online gave it a score of 7 out of 10, criticizing that "there are no masterpieces on this score, even though the variety and entertainment is much more enhanced [over Curious Village's]." RPGFan Music stated "At 75 minutes, this one disc is packed with goodies, though one might also argue that it's packed with filler."

Professor Layton and the Diabolical Box Official Soundtrack
| No. | Title | Length |
|---|---|---|
| 1. | "The Elysian Box Theme" | 2:09 |
| 2. | "In London" | 2:28 |
| 3. | "Puzzles Remixed" | 3:33 |
| 4. | "The Molentary Express" | 3:24 |
| 5. | "Suspense" | 3:54 |
| 6. | "The Village of Dropstone" | 3:32 |
| 7. | "An Uneasy Atmosphere" | 2:45 |
| 8. | "Folsense" | 3:12 |
| 9. | "The Town's Past" | 3:25 |
| 10. | "Time for a Break" | 2:34 |
| 11. | "The Dark Forest" | 3:06 |
| 12. | "Into the Depths of the Dark" | 2:38 |
| 13. | "Unspoken Feelings" | 3:07 |
| 14. | "The Somber Castle" | 2:26 |
| 15. | "The Ball" | 1:51 |
| 16. | "The True Folsense" | 0:36 |
| 17. | "Iris (Music Box Version)" | 3:09 |
| 18. | "The Elysian Box Theme (Live Version)" | 3:34 |
| 19. | "Folsense (Live Version)" | 5:23 |
| 20. | "Don Paolo's Theme (Live Version)" | 4:05 |
| 21. | "Time for a Break (Live Version)" | 4:24 |
| 22. | "The Town's Past (High Quality)" | 3:25 |
| 23. | "The Dark Forest (High Quality)" | 3:06 |
| 24. | "The Somber Castle (High Quality)" | 2:28 |
| Total length: | | 74:14 |

== Release and reception ==
Reception

Aggregate score
| Aggregator | Score |
|---|---|
| Metacritic | 84/100 |

Review scores
| Publication | Score |
|---|---|
| 1Up.com | A+ |
| Adventure Gamers | 4.5/5 |
| The A.V. Club | A− |
| Edge | 7/10 |
| Eurogamer | 8/10 |
| Famitsu | 34/40 |
| Game Informer | 8.25/10 |
| GamePro | 3.5/5 |
| GameRevolution | B |
| GameSpot | 8.5/10 |
| GameSpy | 4.5/5 |
| GameTrailers | 8.8/10 |
| GameZone | 8.6/10 |
| Giant Bomb | 4/5 |
| IGN | (US) 8.5/10 (UK) 8.4/10 |
| Nintendo Life | 9/10 |
| Nintendo Power | 8/10 |
| Nintendo World Report | 9.5/10 |
| Official Nintendo Magazine | 92% |
| VideoGamer.com | 8/10 |
| The Daily Telegraph | 7/10 |
| Wired | 8/10 |

Professor Layton and the Diabolical Box was released in Japan during November 2007, nine months after the release of Curious Village. Following this, Nintendo began to localize the series internationally; Curious Village was released in 2008, though Nintendo had not officially announced the localization of Diabolical Box. The manual of Curious Village, however, implied an eventual release of the second game while mentioning a feature in which passwords are exchanged between Curious Village and Diabolical Box for bonuses in both games. In March 2009, at the Game Developers Conference, Akihiro Hino listed Professor Layton and the Diabolical Box as an English title for the game. At an interview following the conference, he confirmed that the name was the official English title and that the localization was currently being worked on, which he hoped to be finished in about six months.

The game was released in North America during August 2009, as Professor Layton and the Diabolical Box. It would be released in PAL regions during September of the same year, as Professor Layton and Pandora's Box, where it would become the fastest-selling Nintendo DS game ever released within the United Kingdom.

=== Critical reception ===
Professor Layton and the Diabolical Box received "favorable" reviews according to video game review aggregator website Metacritic. In Japan, Famitsu gave it a score of two nines and two eights for a total of 34 out of 40.

The A.V. Club gave it an A− and said that "even if the relatively short game doesn't have much replay value, there's an incentive to keep picking it up for some brain exercise." Wired gave it a score of eight out of ten and said, "While Diabolical Box's gameplay, animation and plot are quite a bit like its predecessor's, slight improvements make this installment of the Professor Layton saga even more enjoyable than the last." However, The Daily Telegraph gave it a score of seven out of ten and said that it "still has more charm and character than most and—despite the hiccups—provides a challenging, fun and satisfying puzzle experience for players young, old—and everything in between." 1Up.com gave the game an A+ and said that, while the developers could have given gamers Curious Village again, "Diabolical Box shows that the game's developers aren't content to just sit on their laurels – they take a wonderful game, and make it even better." VideoGamer.com gave the game an 8/10, stating: "If you liked Mysterious Village and need more, or if you just want something genuinely fresh and original for your DS, Pandora's Box is the answer you're looking for."

During the 13th Annual Interactive Achievement Awards, the Academy of Interactive Arts & Sciences nominated Professor Layton and the Diabolical Box for "Portable Game of the Year" and "Outstanding Achievement in Original Story".

As of July 9, 2008, the game sold 815,369 copies in Japan, according to Famitsu. IGN gave the game Editor's Choice Award, and rated it the eleventh best Nintendo DS game as of 2010. GameTrailers gave the title its best puzzle/parlor game of 2009 award.

Upon its release to Western countries, the game sold more than 1.26 million units by September 2009.
