= Professor Layton and the Miracle Mask =

2011 Japanese puzzle adventure video game

- North American cover art
- Developer: Level-5
- Publishers: JP: Level-5; WW: Nintendo
- Directors: Usuke Kumagai; Jun Suzuki
- Producer: Akihiro Hino
- Composer: Tomohito Nishiura
- Series: Professor Layton
- Platform: Nintendo 3DS
- Release: JP: February 26, 2011; EU: October 26, 2012; AU: October 27, 2012; NA: October 28, 2012
- Genres: Puzzle, Adventure
- Mode: Single-player

Professor Layton and the Miracle Mask (Note: Known in Japan as Reiton-kyōju to Kiseki no Kamen (レイトン教授と奇跡の仮面)) is a puzzle adventure video game developed by Level-5. It is the fifth game in the Professor Layton series, the second in the prequel trilogy of games, and the first in the series to be developed for the Nintendo 3DS. Miracle Mask was released as a launch title for the Nintendo 3DS in Japan in February 2011, becoming the best-selling game on the day of the system's launch. The game was later released worldwide in October 2012. Professor Layton and the Miracle Mask Plus, an enhanced edition featuring new puzzles and added cutscenes, was released on the Nintendo eShop in Japan in February 2013.

The game centers on Professor Hershel Layton, alongside his apprentice, Luke Triton, and his assistant, Emmy Altava, attempting to uncover the truth behind the "Masked Gentleman", a villain who is seemingly terrorising the city of Monte d'Or with supposed uses of "dark magic".

== Gameplay ==
Like previous games in the series, Professor Layton and the Miracle Mask is a puzzle adventure game split across various chapters. Players explore areas and converse with characters to help solve the mysteries that lay before them. At various points in the game, the player will encounter puzzles that need to be solved. Solving these puzzles earn Picarats, used for accessing bonus content, with more Picarats earned for solving the puzzle without any mistakes. Hint coins can also be found which can be spent to unlock hints to help players solve a puzzle if they get stuck.

There are various changes made during the transition to the Nintendo 3DS, as characters and environments are now presented in 3D graphics. Unlike the previous games, in which players interacted directly with the environment on the touch screen, players now use the touch screen to control a magnifying glass to navigate the environment displayed on the top screen. When the magnifying glass is hovered over something of interest, the player can tap the touch screen to inspect it, initiating conversation with characters or revealing a hint coin or puzzle. Certain areas can be zoomed in to reveal more areas to interact with. Puzzles are still controlled on the touch screen, though many have 3D graphics displayed on the top screen and a few also utilise the 3DS' gyroscope feature. Players are given the option to have reminders of the puzzle description temporarily appear on the bottom screen, or stick it to the top.

Like the previous games before it, Miracle Mask has a set of unique minigames that are expanded upon as the player solves puzzles. 'Toy Robot' tasks the player with navigating a maze in order to reach a goal panel whilst avoiding enemies. 'One-Stop Shop' requires players to arrange items on a shelf based on their type and color in order to entice customers to buy everything on display. 'Rabbit Show' sees Luke taking care of a rabbit and training it to perform in the circus. As Luke converses and trains the rabbit, it learns new actions that must be used accordingly to follow a script in a play. In addition, there is a horse-riding minigame which sees players riding a horse, dodging barrels and collecting carrots to speed up. Midway through the game, there is a top-down adventure portion which sees a young Layton navigating an underground ruin. During this segment, Layton must solve puzzles such as pushing boulders and avoiding mummies, also digging up certain areas to reveal hint coins and hidden puzzles.

Along with the 150 puzzles found in the main game, players are also capable of connecting to Nintendo Network in order to download additional puzzles. These puzzles are made available weekly for a year following release, with seven puzzles made available each week; in all, 365 puzzles can be downloaded. Puzzle packages are downloaded automatically via the Spotpass function of the Nintendo 3DS.

== Plot ==
Accompanied by Luke and Emmy, Layton arrives at the city of Monte d'Or to investigate some strange events occurring there by request of an old friend of his youth, Angela Ledore. Once arriving, they have an encounter with a mysterious figure covering his face with an ancient artifact from the Azran Civilization called the "Mask of Chaos", calling himself the "Masked Gentleman", who is responsible for the events, which he calls "miracles", such as making paintings come alive and turning people into horses and statues. As the trio make their own investigation. Layton reveals to his companions that eighteen years ago, he explored some old Azran ruins nearby alongside his close friend Randall Ascot, who was Angela's boyfriend, following some clues Randall obtained by researching the Mask of Chaos. During the expedition, Randall falls in a trap and apparently dies, while Layton discovers a huge treasure that he neither claims nor reveals its location to anyone in Randall's memory. Randall's butler and surrogate brother Henry establishes a huge search operation to look for him, but to no avail, eventually discovering the treasure and using it to found Monte d'Or, marrying Angela a few years later.

As he exposes the Masked Gentleman's "miracles" as elaborate magic tricks, Layton learns that Dalston, another friend of his who is the owner of a hotel chain that rivals Henry Ledore's hotels, is arrested under suspicions that he is involved with the Masked Gentleman and is attempting to frame Henry. An enraged Dalston states that Angela is the Masked Gentleman instead, who wishes to get revenge on Henry for leaving Randall to die. The Masked Gentleman attacks again, revealing that he will perform one final miracle in the next evening and Dalston is released after his name is cleared. Layton begins to suspect Angela and Henry are hiding something from him due to their suspicious behaviour. Furthermore, the team are pressed to search for the Mask of Order, another Azran treasure which is said to counteract the Mask of Chaos' power.

The next night, Layton and his company arrive at the Reunion Inn, the establishment that is said to have provided Monte d'Or with enough money to become a city, where they confront the Masked Gentleman, who reveals himself as Randall. After his fall eighteen years ago, Randall had lost his memories and was living with some villagers who rescued him until he received some anonymous letters that made him recover from his amnesia, but also misled him into believing that he was betrayed by Henry and Layton and inspired him to enact revenge as the Masked Gentleman. Randall detonates some explosives that threaten to bury Monte d'Or in sand. Layton deduces that both the Masks of Order and Chaos are part of the same set and solves an Azran puzzle with Angela's help that reveals the hidden Azran vault, lifting the town upwards to safety in the process.

With the city secured, Layton reveals that Randall was all along being manipulated by Jean Descole, whom at some point kidnapped Angela and disguised as her to make Layton help him unlock the vault, his deception discovered by Layton after he rescued the real Angela in secret. Once exposed, Descole flees. Henry confesses to Randall that he never stopped searching for him and that his marriage with Angela was forged to discourage other suitors, revealing that all of Ledore's assets are registered in Randall's name in preparation for his return. Randall reconciles with his family and friends, and Layton and company set off on their next adventure, while Descole rejoices at having finally found the Azran vault he was looking for until he is attacked by Bronev and his organization Targent. Descole evades capture, but Bronev's men secure the vault. He then states that this, along with The Gardens of Healing from Misthallery (which Layton found in the Last Specter), The City of Harmony from Ambrosia (which Layton found in the Eternal Diva), would combine to form the three Azran legacies, which he plans to use for his own gains.

== Development ==
Miracle Mask was overseen by Akihiro Hino, the CEO of Level-5, and directed by Jun Suzuki. The game's puzzles were created by Akira Tago, author of the Atama no Taisō (頭の体操; Mental Gymnastics) series of puzzle books, who had also created the puzzles for the previous games in the series.

The game was first announced as a Nintendo DS title at the official launch event for Professor Layton and the Last Specter, where it was scheduled for Japanese release during Q3 2010. Hino promised that Miracle Mask would bring major changes to the series' gameplay systems, and said that the trilogy was imagined with a second movie to take place after Miracle Mask. Although artwork, a logo, and the setting of the game's story were given, the game was not demonstrated at the event.

After seeing the Nintendo 3DS, Hino systematically shifted projects from other systems to it, in hopes that Level-5 would be recognized as a firm part of the image of the Nintendo 3DS system. Miracle Mask was one of these projects. Though the game was originally built in 2D, it was made to look "pseudo-3D" for Nintendo's E3 2010 presentation. After seeing what other publishers had produced for the system, however, Hino decided to completely remake the game in order to use the systems's unique qualities. He expressed his belief that the game would be the "best in the series so far", and that the game felt like "something completely new, something no one's ever seen before".

At a Nintendo press event later in 2010, the first trailer for Miracle Mask, originally under the name The Mask of Miracle, was released along with screenshots, demonstrating the graphical and gameplay overhauls that had taken place over the system's switch to Nintendo 3DS; the previous games' hand-drawn 2D sprites had been replaced by 3D models, areas of the game could now be examined in a 3D perspective, and several puzzles took advantage of the 3DS' features, including its motion sensor. Despite the game's new visual style, the appearance of the series' animated cutscenes remained intact, albeit rendered in 3D. Another trailer was released at Level-5's 2010 "Vision" event, revealing the Japanese voice actors, the game's ending theme, the plans for the game's puzzle downloading service, and the game's second timeline, following a younger Professor Layton in high school.

== Release ==
Professor Layton and the Miracle Mask was first released in 2011 as a launch title for the Nintendo 3DS within Japan. It sold 117,000 copies in its first weekend, making it the system's best-selling title upon its release. Ultimately, the title would be outsold by other Nintendo 3DS games, such as Super Mario 3D Land and Mario Kart 7, to become the sixth best-selling Nintendo 3DS game in the region during 2012 at 360,000 copies. It was also the second best-selling third party title for the system, behind Monster Hunter Tri G, and the twenty-sixth best-selling game of the year overall.

A tentative English title for the game, Professor Layton and the Mask of Miracle, was provided along with an early demo at E3 2010; however, no other information was provided about its international release. In late 2011, a European trailer for Professor Layton and the Spectre's Call alluded to a fifth entry in the series being released for Nintendo 3DS in 2012; this was later confirmed in a press release, where the game received its second tentative title of Professor Layton 5.

In May 2012, a trademark titled Professor Layton and the Miracle Mask (its final title) was filed by Level 5, hinting at an eventual U.S. release. Despite this, no announcements were made at E3 2012. The game was later released in Europe on October 26, 2012, in Australia on October 27, and in North America on October 28.

An updated version of the game titled Professor Layton and the Miracle Mask Plus was released for the Nintendo eShop in Japan in early 2013. It added new features to the original game, including more cutscenes, three save slots, and additional puzzles. It includes bonus tutorials and hints for younger players as well as all the downloadable content from the original.

== Soundtrack ==
"Mysterious Flower"
Sample of "Mysterious Flower", the game's ending theme song by Yumi Matsutoya.

The game's soundtrack was composed by Tomohito Nishiura. Unlike the other titles in the series, no official soundtrack has been released for Professor Layton and the Miracle Mask.

The game's ending theme, entitled "Mysterious Flower", was composed by Yumi Matsutoya. Her 2011 album Road Show features a music video for the song animated in the style of Professor Layton, adding her into cutscenes from the game.

== Reception ==
Reception

Aggregate scores
Aggregator	Score
GameRankings	82.71% recommend
Metacritic	82/100

Review scores
Publication	Score
1Up.com	B
Adventure Gamers	3.5/5
Destructoid	8.5/10
Edge	7/10
Electronic Gaming Monthly	8.5/10
Eurogamer	8/10
Famitsu	32/40
Game Informer	8/10
GameRevolution	4/5
GameSpot	8.5/10
GamesRadar+	4/5
IGN	8.7/10
Joystiq	4/5
Nintendo Life	9/10
Nintendo Power	8/10
Nintendo World Report	8/10
Official Nintendo Magazine	85%
Common Sense Media	5/5
Digital Spy	4/5

In Japan, the game got a score of 32 out of 40 in Famitsu, who praised the game's investigation mechanics but said that the puzzles did not make enough use of 3D. IGN said that the Japanese version was "perfect for a portable system" and said that its puzzles remained surprising and well-designed despite being the fifth entry in the series; however, they expressed disappointment at the long wait for the game's localization. Andriasang stated that, despite the changes made to it, the Japanese version still feels like a Professor Layton game.

Elsewhere, the game received "favorable" reviews according to video game review aggregator Metacritic. Common Sense Media gave it all five stars, saying, "Returning fans will recognize the style of many of the game's puzzles. Some force you to carefully analyze images, others are tricky riddles, and still others involve clever application of basic math skills -- but each one is different enough from the last that boredom never sets in. Add in yet another engaging story filled with quirky personalities and several seemingly unsolvable grand mysteries, and you have a recipe for a very memorable Professor Layton adventure." National Post gave it a score of 8.5 out of 10, saying that it "entertains without violence or scares, it provides a healthy workout for your brain, and it's suitable for most ages and both genders. It will provide hours of entertainment for your son, your daughter, you, and your significant other (you'll need to take turns playing, but that's what multiple save files are for). Suffice to say we think Santa couldn't have chosen a better stocking stuffer for clever kids (or their parents)." Digital Spy gave it four stars out of five, saying, "Its fascinating story and well-balanced array of puzzles means Professor Layton and the Miracle Mask is probably the best outing in the series since the ground-breaking original, and the new approach to visuals once again reminds you of the system's now forgotten selling point: its terrific 3D screen." 1Up.com gave the game a B stating: "The puzzles remain engrossing, but the story and world this time around miss the mark."
