= Tomohito Nishiura =

Japanese video game music composer

Tomohito Nishiura 西浦 智仁
- Born: February 13, 1973 (age 53); Setagaya-ku, Tokyo, Japan
- Genres: Video game music
- Occupations: Composer, arranger
- Instrument: Piano
- Years active: 1998–present

Tomohito Nishiura (西浦 智仁, Nishiura Tomohito) is a Japanese video game music composer. He works primarily on games developed by Level-5.

== Works ==
- OverBlood 2 (1998) – sound effects
- Dark Cloud (2000)
- Dark Chronicle (2002)
- Rogue Galaxy (2005)
- Professor Layton and the Curious Village (2007)
- Professor Layton and the Diabolical Box (2007)
- Professor Layton and the Unwound Future (2008)
- Professor Layton's London Life (2009)
- Professor Layton and the Last Specter (2009)
- Professor Layton and the Eternal Diva (2009)
- Professor Layton and the Miracle Mask (2011)
- Professor Layton vs. Phoenix Wright: Ace Attorney (2012)
- Professor Layton and the Azran Legacy (2013)
- Layton's Mystery Journey (2017)
- Y School Heroes: Bustlin' School Life (2020) – with Kenichiro Saigo
