= Professor Layton and the Unwound Future =

2008 Japanese puzzle video game

- North American box art
- Developers: Level-5; Matrix Software (iOS, Android)
- Publishers: Nintendo DS: JP: Level-5; WW: Nintendo; iOS, Android: WW: Level-5
- Directors: Usuke Kumagai; Jun Suzuki
- Producer: Akihiro Hino
- Composer: Tomohito Nishiura
- Series: Professor Layton
- Platforms: Nintendo DS, iOS, Android
- Release: Nintendo DS: JP: November 27, 2008; NA: September 12, 2010; AU: October 21, 2010; EU: October 22, 2010; iOS, Android: WW: July 13, 2020
- Genres: Puzzle, Adventure
- Mode: Single-player

Professor Layton and the Unwound Future, (Note: Known as Professor Layton and the Lost Future in Europe and Reiton-kyōju to Saigo no Jikan Ryokō (レイトン教授と最後の時間旅行; lit. Professor Layton and the Final Time Travel) in Japan.) known in Europe and Australia as Professor Layton and the Lost Future, is the third game in the first trilogy of the Professor Layton puzzle game series by Level-5 and in conclusion the final game of the first trilogy. It was first released in Japan in November 2008 and was later released in North America in September 2010 and in Europe and Australia in October 2010. In the game, Layton meets an older version of his apprentice, Luke, who brings him to a terrible future he wishes him to help fix. The game received acclaim from critics, praise for its story, puzzles, characters, soundtrack, and has since been cited as one of the best games of the series. An enhanced mobile port of Unwound Future, subtitled "HD for Mobile", was released on July 13, 2020.

== Gameplay ==
An early puzzle in Professor Layton and the Unwound Future. The puzzle is solved via input on the bottom screen, while instructions are given on the top.

As with previous Professor Layton games, Unwound Future is an adventure game where the player solves puzzles offered by local citizens to progress the story forward, through dialogue and around 32 minutes of full motion video. The player moves about the game through still images of locations. The player can use the DS touchscreen to tap on non-player characters to start a dialog or to obtain a puzzle, and also can search anywhere on the background for hint coins, with some areas needing to be tapped several times to reveal a secret hint coin or puzzle. Puzzles are brainteasers of many varieties, including visual, math, and logic. There is no time limit to solve puzzles, and the player can get up to three hints at a cost of one hint coin each; a new feature in Unwound Future is a "super hint", costing two coins, that can only be bought after the other three hints have been revealed, but that nearly reveals the puzzle's solution. If the player is correct in solving the puzzle, they gain a number of "Picarats", a form of currency within the game. Guessing the incorrect answer will reduce the number of picarats the player can get on subsequent attempts. Players can visit certain areas in order to play undiscovered or unsolved puzzles that are left behind as the story progresses.

As part of rewards for solving puzzles, the player may play one of three mini-games that support additional puzzles in Layton's Trunk that can be attempted at any time. One mini-game is based on sticker books, placing the correct stickers at locations in the book to make the story make sense. Another requires training a parrot to carry items to a character using a series of ropes to act as perches or rebounding walls. The third mini-game is a toy car that the player must drive across specific tiles on a map using a series of directional indicators. Layton's Bag also contains details on the story, characters, and a list of completed puzzles the player can review and try again.

After completing the game, several other puzzle challenges become available in the game's bonus features, many more difficult than the main game puzzles. When the player has completed all the puzzles within the game, a final puzzle is revealed. Players may also access a number of bonus features depending on how many picarats they have accumulated throughout the game.

As with the previous two titles in the series, additional weekly puzzles were available for download via the Bonus menu, with one being released each week from the original release date, for 30 weeks. After May 20, 2014, it's no longer possible to download the additional content, as the Nintendo Wi-Fi Connection service was terminated on that date.

== Plot ==
As Layton and Luke are invited to witness a demonstration of a time machine built by Dr. Alain Stahngun, the experiment goes awry, causing the disappearance of Stahngun and the prime minister, Bill Hawks. One week later, as numerous scientists have been reported missing, Layton and Luke receive a letter purporting to be from Luke ten years in the future, leading the two to a quaint clock shop in the London back alleys. Inside, the old couple who own the shop show the two another time machine in the guise of a giant clock, and the pair find themselves in a drastically-changed quasi-steam punk London ten years from their present, where they meet the Future Luke. He explains that in this future, Layton has become the head of a mafia-like mob known as the Family and taken control of London. Layton and Luke agree to assist Future Luke in stopping this Future Layton. After briefly returning to the past to look up some files pertaining to an accident which claimed the life of his girlfriend, Claire, ten years ago, Layton and Luke return to the future London, inadvertently bringing Flora, Inspector Chelmey and his assistant Barton with him. As the group investigates the whereabouts of Future Layton, Luke becomes withdrawn for a short time. It's revealed that his family is moving overseas, and he's afraid of losing his friendship with Layton. Layton reassures him that their friendship will persist even when they're apart, and they resume the investigation.

Travelling through Chinatown and up a giant pagoda, the group encounter Future Layton, where he is revealed to be Dr. Stahngun, whose true identity is Dimitri Allen. He reveals he has taken Bill hostage, and wants to build the time machine to save Claire from the accident that happened 10 years prior to Layton's present time. This led to Dimitri's dedication to build a working time machine and return to the past so he can save Claire's life. He also used Layton's identity to not only hide its own, but also tease the real Layton to come to him so he can obtain Layton's memories in order to create the bridge in space-time so he could reach the moment of the explosion to save Claire. Dimitri attempts to trap Layton, but this plan is foiled when Don Paolo, a recurring villain-turned-hero of the series, reveals that he has been disguised as Layton to help and that he also loved Claire.

Together they infiltrate Dimitri's base of operations to free the other scientists, where Layton encounters Claire's near-identical sister, Celeste, who assists them in escaping. As everyone gathers at the Thames Arms restaurant, where Dimitri is also waiting for them disguised as the bartender, Layton manages to deduce that they are not actually in the future, but in a pseudo-replica of London built in a cavern. The purpose of this replica was to fool the scientists into thinking they were stranded 10 years from home, motivating them to build a time machine in order to return home. Dimitri built this replica London when he realized that he alone could not construct a working time machine and needed scientists that were just as motivated as him. He reveals that he and Bill, along with Claire (whom he also had feelings for), were working on a time machine ten years ago, but Bill's desire for money made him sell a crucial part, which led to the accident that claimed Claire's life. This led to Dimitri's dedication to build a working time machine and return to the past so he can save Claire's life. Layton also deduces that Dimitri is but a pawn compared to the true mastermind, Future Luke, whose true identity is Clive, a boy who sought revenge against Dimitri, Bill and London in general as the explosion that killed Claire also took his parents away from him.

Kidnapping Flora, Clive escapes to his mobile fortress, the machine the scientists had really been working on without Dimitri's knowledge, which he brings to the surface to attack London. With help from Don Paolo, Layton and Luke manage to board the fortress and free Flora, later joined by Celeste. After deducing that they need to reverse the flow of power from the generator, they discover Bill is attached to the generator, wired to a bomb. With thanks to Celeste's old watch, they manage to reroute the bomb's wires, free Bill and reverse the power flow of the fortress, causing it to collapse. After flying Don Paolo's modified Laytonmobile to get everyone to the ground, where Chelmey manages to evacuate the underground citizens, Layton returns to help Celeste rescue Clive from the fortress before it falls down into the fake future London and explodes.

As everyone safely regroups, Clive is put under arrest but promises to atone for his crimes, thanking Layton for comforting him as he did the day his parents were killed. It is then revealed that Celeste is actually Claire herself, who was teleported ten years into the future during the accident. However, her presence had become unstable and would soon send her back in time to the moment of her death, leading Dimitri to try to find a way to save her but to no avail. Accepting her fate, Claire has a tearful final reunion with Layton before bidding farewell and disappearing back to her time, to the moment of her death. Layton, although crushed to lose Claire again, finally comes to terms with his loss and removes his hat out of respect to her as it snows.

After the incident, Layton bids farewell to Luke as he boards a ship to his new home. Some time later, Layton receives a letter from Luke, inviting him to investigate another puzzling situation with him.

== Release ==
The game was released in Japan on November 27, 2008, and was the 15th best-selling game in 2008. A western localization of the game was revealed at E3 2010, with a September 20, 2010 release date for North America, and an October 22, 2010 release date for Europe. At the same time in the UK, an English localization of the film Professor Layton and the Eternal Diva was released. An English trailer was also shown. The North American release date was later pushed to September 12, 2010.

== Music ==
Like the previous two games, the game's music was composed by Tomohito Nishiura and later released in Japan, on an album titled Layton Kyoju to Saigo no Jikan Ryoko Original Soundtrack. Several entirely new puzzle themes were composed for puzzles in this game. Unwound Future's ending theme, "Time Travel", was sung by Ann Sally in the original Japanese versions, while the international versions replaced it with an instrumental version. The soundtrack album replaces the vocal theme with a separate piano version, not included in either release of the game.

Square Enix Music Online gave the album a score of eight out of ten and called it the "best and most entertaining album in the trilogy, but criticized its "lack of memorability and entertainment outside of the game." RPGFan Music responded favorably, stating, "It all held my interest, from start to finish, through multiple listens."

Professor Layton and the Unwound Future Official Soundtrack
No.	Title	English Localization	Length
1.	"最後の時間旅行のテーマ <生演奏ヴァージョン>"	The Unwound Future (Live Version)	3:39
2.	"謎3"	Puzzles Reinvented	2:12
3.	"ロンドン2"	London Streets	3:04
4.	"手がかりを求め"	Searching for Clues	1:53
5.	"緊迫"	Tension	2:23
6.	"ロンドン3"	More London Streets	3:51
7.	"穏やかな町"	A Quiet Town	1:58
8.	"カジノナンバー7"	The Gilded 7 Casino	2:42
9.	"悲しみの中"	Sorrow	1:49
10.	"不審"	Suspicion	2:34
11.	"アジアンストリート"	Chinatown	1:58
12.	"ナゾバトル"	Puzzle Battle	1:47
13.	"記憶とともに"	Memories	3:00
14.	"六角塔"	The Towering Pagoda	2:13
15.	"教授の推理"	The Professor's Deductions	2:39
16.	"ピンチ！"	Crisis	2:49
17.	"科学研究所"	The Research Facility	1:52
18.	"謎4"	Puzzles Reinvented 2	1:59
19.	"巨大兵器"	The Mobile Fortress	4:00
20.	"教授のカバン（絵本）"	The Picture Book	1:58
21.	"教授のカバン（ミニカー）"	The Toy Car	1:55
22.	"教授のカバン（パロちゃん）"	The Parrot	2:15
23.	"時間旅行〜ピアノver.〜（Instrumental）"	Time Travel Piano ver.~Instrumental	3:15
24.	"ロンドン3 <生演奏ヴァージョン>"	More London Streets (Live Version)	3:14
25.	"科学研究所 <生演奏ヴァージョン>"	The Research Facility (Live Version)	2:33
26.	"巨大兵器 <生演奏ヴァージョン>"	The Mobile Fortress (Live Version)	2:58
27.	"六角塔 <ハイクオリティーヴァージョン>"	The Towering Pagoda (High Quality Version)	3:56
28.	"教授のカバン（ミニカー） <ハイクオリティーヴァージョン>"	The Toy Car (High Quality Version)	3:17
Total length:			73:43

== Reception ==
Reception

Aggregate score
Aggregator	Score
Metacritic	86/100

Review scores
Publication	Score
1Up.com	A−
Adventure Gamers	3.5/5
The A.V. Club	A−
Destructoid	9/10
Edge	7/10
Eurogamer	9/10
Famitsu	33/40
Game Informer	8.25/10
GamePro	4/5
GameRevolution	B+
GameSpot	8.5/10
GamesRadar+	4.5/5
GameTrailers	8.6/10
GameZone	8.5/10
IGN	8.5/10
Joystiq	4/5
Nintendo Life	9/10
Nintendo Power	9/10
Nintendo World Report	9/10
Official Nintendo Magazine	93%
The Guardian	5/5
VideoGamer.com	8/10
The Escapist	5/5

Awards
Publication	Award
Nintendo Power	Best Puzzle Game, Finish Strong Award (2010)
1UP.com	Best Puzzle Game (2010)

Professor Layton and the Unwound Future received "favorable" reviews according to video game review aggregator website Metacritic.

Video game talk show Good Game: Spawn Point's two presenters praised the memo overlay feature and said, "If you're a Layton fan, then you're going to get exactly what you expect — which is some very polished and brilliant puzzle action." Nintendo Power's review said, "I have no qualms calling this the best Professor Layton game yet", and, in the 2010 Nintendo Power awards, the game was recognized as both the best puzzle game and the game with the strongest ending released in 2010. In Japan, Famitsu gave the game a score of one nine and three eights for a total of 33 out of 40.

The Escapist gave the game all five stars and called it "a brain-twisting delight. Show up for the clever puzzles, stick around for the gorgeous visuals and quirky minigames." The Guardian similarly gave it all five stars and said it was "perfectly designed for DS and something the whole family can get sucked into." The A.V. Club gave it an A− and said that it "doesn't require knowledge of the previous games, but still builds the trilogy to an appropriately grand conclusion." The Daily Telegraph gave it a score of nine out of ten and called it "an absolute delight." 1Up.com gave the game an A−, stating: "The story might not draw you along as well as it has in previous games, but it's always a joy to visit Layton's puzzle-rich world." VideoGamer.com gave the game an 8 out of 10 and said, "The presentation is as charming as ever, and bar a few niggles, Lost Future as a whole is extremely enjoyable."

During the 14th Annual Interactive Achievement Awards, the Academy of Interactive Arts & Sciences nominated Professor Layton and the Unwound Future for "Portable Game of the Year".

As of December 2010, Unwound Future sold 862,967 copies in Japan, and more than 1.87 million copies in North America and Europe. As of March 2011, its sales in North America and Europe totalled 1.97 million copies sold.

In the June 2020 issue of Edge, the writers featured Unwound Future in their list of "feel better" games in response to the COVID-19 pandemic. Edge wrote that the game is a standout in the series and is "a trilogy-capper that still satisfies", especially with its emotional ending.
