= Akira Tago =

Japanese psychologist

Akira Tago (Japanese: 多湖 輝, February 25, 1926 – March 6, 2016) was a Japanese psychologist. He was an honorary emeritus of Tokyo Future University and a professor emeritus of Chiba University. He was also the chief of Akira Tago Laboratory.

He compiled a best-selling quiz book series Atama no Taisou (頭の体操, literally Head Gymnastics), from 1966 to his death. There are 23 volumes published. He was also known for designing the puzzles of video games, including the Professor Layton series, in which he is cited as a "Puzzle Master" in the credits. In the titular Professor Layton's office, the player can also find a book which the professor is reading written by a puzzle master from abroad: as the games take place in the UK, this is likely referring to Tago. He died at the age of 90 in March 2016.
