= 16th Japan Film Professional Awards =

Japanese film awards in 2007

- Date: 2007

The 16th Japan Film Professional Awards (第16回日本映画プロフェッショナル大賞) is the 16th edition of the Japan Film Professional Awards. Films of 2006 were eligible, with a focus on independent works not released by major distribution companies. An award ceremony did not take place.

== Awards ==
- Best Film: Yokohama Mary
- Best Director: Miwa Nishikawa (Sway)
- Best Actress: Miki Nakatani (Memories of Matsuko, Loft)
- Best Actor: Etsushi Toyokawa (It's Only Talk, Loft, Hula Girls)
- Best New Director: Takayuki Nakamura (Yokohama Mary)
- Special: Ryūichi Hiroki (It's Only Talk, Koi Suru Nichiyōbi)
- Special: Akio Jissoji (For Silver Kamen and his longtime work.)
- Popularity: Kaori Momoi (For strenuous efforts for her directorial debut film.)

== 10 best films ==
1. Yokohama Mary (Takayuki Nakamura)
2. Sway (Miwa Nishikawa)
3. It's Only Talk (Ryūichi Hiroki)
4. Kamome Shokudo (Naoko Ogigami)
5. Strawberry Shortcakes (Hitoshi Yazaki)
6. Memories of Matsuko (Tetsuya Nakashima)
7. Who's Camus Anyway? (Mitsuo Yanagimachi)
8. Loft (Kiyoshi Kurosawa)
9. Noriko's Dinner Table (Sion Sono)
10. Mamiya kyodai (Yoshimitsu Morita)
