= Unsolved Cases =

Japanese television drama and film

Unsolved Cases (ケイゾク, Keizoku) is a Japanese mystery thriller created first as a TV drama and later as a film. It is about Detective Jun Shibata, who handles unsolved cases with her hardened partner Tōru Mayama.

The television series was broadcast in 11 episodes between 8 January and 19 March 1999 on TBS Television and JNN affiliate stations. A two-hour "special drama" was then broadcast on 24 December 1999. The series has been called "epoch-making" in the police procedural genre on Japanese television.

== Television ==
=== Cast ===
- Miki Nakatani - Shibata Jun
- Atsuro Watabe - Mayama Tôru
- Sarina Suzuki - Kido Aya
- Yu Tokui - Kondo Akio
- Hidekazu Nagae - Taniguchi Tsuyoshi
- Kenichi Yajima - Hayashida Seiichi
- Masashi Arifuku - Nagao Noboru
- Mari Nishio - Osawa Maiko
- Goro Noguchi - Saotome Jin
- Raita Ryu - Nonomura Koutarou
- Shigeru Izumiya -Tsubosaka Kunio

=== Episode Titles ===
- 01: "Phone Call from the Dead Man"
- 02: "Punishment Table of Ice"
- 03: "The Wiretapped Murderer"
- 04: "The Room of Certain Death"
- 05: "The Man Who Saw the Future"
- 06: "The Wickedest Bombing-Demon"
- 07: "Death Curse of the Oil Painting"
- 08: "Farewell, Lovely Cutthroat"
- 09: "Future Revenge of the Past"
- 10: "Your Own Two Eyes"
- 11: "The Kiss of Death's Flavor"

=== Production ===
- Screenwriter: Nishiogi Yumie
- Producer: Ueda Hiroki
- Directors: Tsutsumi Yukihiko, Kaneko Fuminori, Imai Natsuki, Isano Hideki
- Music: Mitake Akira

== Film (2000) ==
=== Cast ===
- Shibata Jun: Nakatani Miki
- Mayama Tôru: Watabe Atsuro
- Hideyo Amamoto
- Inuko Inuyama
- David Ito
- Izumi Pinko
- Kunio Tsubosaka: Shigeru Izumiya
- Hairi Katagiri
- Kera
- Koyuki
- Katsuyuki Murai
- Katsuhisa Namase
- Nanako Ookôchi: Nanako Ôkôchi
- Kôtarô Nonomura: Raita Ryu
- Toshiya Sakai
- Aya Kido Sarina Suzuki
- Tomorowo Taguchi
- Masahiro Takaki
- Akio Kondô Yu Tokui
- Kenichi Yajima

=== Production ===
- Director: Yukihiko Tsutsumi
- Music: Akira Mitake
- Cinematography: Satoru Karasawa
- Editing: Soichi Ueno
- Visual effects supervisor: Fumihiko Sori
- Visual effects(Renderman): Bernard Edlington

== Accolades ==
| Award | Category | Recipient(s) | Result | Ref. |
|---|---|---|---|---|
| 9th TV Life Annual Drama Awards | Best Series | Unsolved Cases | Won | |
