= Memories of Matsuko =

- Japanese film poster
- Directed by: Tetsuya Nakashima
- Screenplay by: Tetsuya Nakashima
- Based on: A novel by Muneki Yamada
- Produced by: Yasuhiro Mase Yuji Ishida; Hidemi Satami
- Starring: Miki Nakatani; Eita; Yusuke Iseya; Teruyuki Kagawa
- Cinematography: Masakazu Ato
- Edited by: Yoshiyuki Koike
- Music by: Gabriele Roberto
- Production companies: Amuse Soft Entertainment; Kiraware Matusko no issho; Tokyo Broadcasting Committee
- Distributed by: Toho
- Release date: 27 May 2006 (Japan)
- Running time: 130 minutes
- Country: Japan
- Language: Japanese
- Box office: $9,578,449

Memories of Matsuko (Japanese: 嫌われ松子の一生, Hepburn: Kiraware Matsuko no Isshō; lit. "Life of Despised Matsuko") is a 2006 Japanese tragicomedy musical film written and directed by Tetsuya Nakashima. It is based on a Japanese novel by Muneki Yamada.

It has not yet received North American distribution, though in its North American premiere at the 2007 New York Asian Film Festival, the film received the Audience Award with an average rating of 9.2.

== Summary ==
Following a breakup with his girlfriend, Sho Kawajiri sinks into an existential crisis and hides himself at home, before his father, Norio, pays him a surprise visit. Sho is surprised to see an urn with the ashes of his aunt Matsuko, who he has never met. Sho is asked to help clean her old room, and while doing so, he gradually learns more about the life of his estranged aunt.

During Matsuko's early life, she struggled to gain the attention of her father, who was mostly concerned with her chronically ill sister, Kumi. This created an imbalance where Matsuko's needs were less likely to be met and she constantly feels unloved.

From 1970 to 1971, Matsuko was a very popular junior high school music teacher in Ōkawa, Fukuoka. However, she was sexually harassed by the vice-principal when one of her students, Ryu, committed theft. Under the pressure to close the case quickly, Matsuko took the blame for him and returned the money by stealing from another person. She tries to get Ryu to confess only to find out that he joins in on the lie accusing her instead in front of the school principals. As a result, Matsuko gets fired from her job. Infuriated by everyone around her betraying her, Matsuko angrily packs her things at home and leaves, despite Kumi's protests.

Months later, Matsuko's brother, Norio, runs into her and Matsuko tells him that she is in a relationship with Tetsuya, an aspiring but poor writer who regularly abuses her for not able to financially support both of them. Norio blames her for destroying their family and gives her some money while telling her that their father had died 3 months after she left. Returning home, Tetsuya begins to abuse her again after she let Tetsuya's rival writer Okano see his work and walks away. At night, she received a note reading: "Please forgive me for being born". During a rainstorm, Matsuko witnesses Tetsuya commit suicide by standing in front of a train, devastating her.

Six months later, Matsuko begins a new relationship with Okano, but hoping to make the relationship more serious, she visits his wife without him knowing. After Okano's wife forces him to confess, he then blames Matsuko and breaks up with her before telling her that he has never loved her and was only attracted to her body. Because of Okano's words before leaving, the devastated Matsuko goes to audition for a prostitute job and gets hired. A few months later after making some money, Matsuko returns home, where she reads her father's diary and is moved to tears at his concern for her disappearance. Kumi sees her and tries to hug her, but Matsuko pushes her away and runs back to her car.

Some time later, Matsuko is in a relationship with Onodera, a pimp. When she asks him for her salary, he nonchalantly replies that he has already given the money to another girl whom he will soon move in with, and the two get into a fight. During the struggle, Onodera pins Matsuko against a dressing mirror and insults her appearance, while Matsuko pulls a knife on Onodera, but he begins to strangle her. On the brink of losing consciousness, Matsuko loses her grip on the knife, which lands on Onodera's foot. As he wails over his injury and threatens to sue Matsuko, she seizes the opportunity to stab Onodera to death. Afterwards, she tries to commit suicide by jumping off the building, but is ultimately unable to, as her hands instinctively held onto the railings.

In the present, Sho discovers that his ex-girlfriend will be going to Uzbekistan with the Japan Overseas Cooperation Volunteers. He also has a dream where a porn actress comes and kidnap him; the same actress later reveals herself to be Megumi Sawamura, Matsuko's best friend who knew each other in prison.

Back in the past, following Onodera's death, Matsuko boards a train to Tokyo, where she intends to commit suicide at the Tamagawa Aqueduct. However, she is stopped by Keji Shimazu, a barber who later gives Matsuko a new haircut at his salon. They make love that night and she becomes his assistant after Keji swears that he will always love her despite her past. Shortly after however, Matsuko is arrested for Onodera's murder, and she is sentenced to eight years in prison. After her release, she tries to go back to Keji, only to discover that he has since gotten married and already has a son.

In the present, Megumi takes Sho to dinner and tells him that she met Matsuko again at a salon after her release in Ginza where Matsuko worked. They quickly became best friends. But at one night after drinking together, they went to Megumi's house and hearing Megumi's husband's voice speak at the doorstep, the jealous Matsuko decides to go back to her home and be alone again at her birthday. Megumi also tells Sho about the time that Matsuko wanted to end their friendship after she quit her job at the salon, and the last time she saw Matsuko before her death, where all she could do was give her business card to Matsuko. Megumi tells Sho that he must always remember that Matsuko is still with him whenever he thinks about her, and takes him back to Matsuko's house. However, a man enters and attacks Sho, demanding to know where Matsuko is; he is dejected upon learning of her death, and reveals himself to be Ryu.

Back in the past, Ryu has since become a yakuza, and reunites with Matsuko at the salon. Later, she has him take her home, and she begins to tell him everything that has happened to her. Ryu is remorseful for causing her misery, especially since he is in love with her, but Matsuko forgives him and returns his feelings. They soon start a relationship. One day, Matsuko tells Ryu that she has quit her job at the salon, while also trying to stop him from going back to the yakuza. Ryu refuses and also starts hitting and abusing her. After Megumi tries to warn her, she pledges that no matter what Ryu becomes, she will always love him. Unable to stop Ryu, Matsuko also goes back to prostitution and joins various crime activities. Some time later, Ryu asks Matsuko to meet him at a hotel, where she finds him severely beaten by the yakuza due to his gambling debts. Chased by the yakuza, Ryu wants to commit suicide together with Matsuko but eventually fails to do so. When Matsuko mentions starting a family, Ryu pushes her out and calls the police to confess, which gives Matsuko time to escape. Afterwards, Ryu is arrested and sent to prison; Matsuko faithfully awaits his release, but Ryu continues to regret his actions against Matsuko and wishes to leave her alone to save her from further harm. Following Ryu's release from prison, Matsuko welcomes him back, but he hits her before running away, leaving her alone again.

In the present, a regretful Ryu plans on killing himself, but the police suddenly arrive, and Ryu loudly proclaims that he killed Matsuko before getting into a fight with the police. However, one officer tells Sho that they already have the actual murderer and were just trying to ask him some questions. Sho tells Norio that he wishes that he could have met his aunt, but Norio reveals that when Sho was still young, he already encountered her sitting at the riverbank, when Norio was taking her to the train station. After revealing that Kumi has died the previous year, he tells her to never come back. Sho then tells Norio that she rented a house near the river and would always cry by the riverbank, driving Norio to tears.

Back in the past, Matsuko rents a house near the river at Kita-Senju Station, where she spends her days doing nothing but eating and drinking. One day, she sees a performance by Hikaru Genji on TV, and develops a crush on its leader, Kohji Uchiumi. She begins to buy all his merchandise, watching live performances and writing fan-letters to him, but becomes furious when he does not reply.

Eventually, she begins to lose control of herself and starts to write the phrase: "Please forgive me for being born" on her walls. While out to get medicine, Megumi sees her and tries to talk to her, but is rebuffed. Afterwards, Megumi tells her that she is looking for a hairdresser and gives her a business card, but Matsuko refuses Megumi's offer. That night, she has a dream of cutting Kumi's hair, and she is inspired to find Megumi's business card that she had previously discarded. Meanwhile, she encounters a gang of high school students who try to bully her, but when she tells them to go back home, one of the students hits her in the head and the rest of them beat her to death.

Afterwards, a light appears in front of Matsuko and her soul travels back in time to her house. Eventually, Matsuko's soul stands in front of staircase to heaven, where Kumi is waiting for her and welcomes her back.

== Cast ==
Matsuko's family

- Miki Nakatani – Matsuko Kawajiri (川尻 松子 Kawajiri Matsuko)
- Kana Okunoya – younger Matsuko Kawajiri
- Eita – Sho Kawajiri (川尻 笙 Kawajiri Shō): Matsuko's nephew. He moved to Tokyo to become a musician.
- Akira Emoto – Kozo Kawajiri (川尻 恒造 Kawajiri Kōzō): Matsuko's father. He has a sad and distant demeanour to Matsuko due to Kumi's illness.
- Teruyuki Kagawa – Norio Kawajiri (川尻 紀夫 Kawajiri Norio): Matsuko's brother. He is resentful of Matsuko because she destroyed the family.
- Mikako Ichikawa – Kumi Kawajiri (川尻 久美 Kawajiri Kumi): Matsuko's ill sister.

Matsuko's men

- Yusuke Iseya – Youichi Ryu (龍 洋一 Ryū Yōichi): A former student of Matsuko. He was one of the reasons Matsuko's life changed for the worse. He becomes a yakuza when he grows up.
- Shosuke Tanihara – Shunji Saeki (佐伯 俊二 Saeki Shunji): A colleague teacher whom Matsuko thinks fondly of when she still works in school.
- Kankuro Kudo – Tetsuya Yamekawa: An aspiring writer who believes he is Osamu Dazai's rebirth.
- Gekidan Hitori – Takeo Okano (岡野 健夫 Okano Takeo): Tetsuya's rival, also an aspiring writer.
- Ryo Arakawa - Kenji Shimazu: A barber who stops Matsuko from committing suicide.
- Shinji Takeda - Yasushi Onodera: An aspiring pimp who was killed by Matsuko.

Other

- Asuka Kurosawa – Megumi Sawamura (沢村 めぐみ Sawamura Megumi): Matsuko's best friend. Former stripper and now porn-star actress as "Aoi Mizusawa". She owns an adult film company.
- Bonnie Pink – Ayano (綾乃)
- Nagisa Katahira – herself
- Sora Aoi

== Release ==
=== Initial release ===
Memories of Matsuko was distributed theatrically in Japan on May 26, 2006 by Toho. The film won Miki Nakatani the award for Best Actress at the Mainichi Film Concours (also given for her work in Loft and Christmas on July 24th Avenue), as well as Best Actress at Japanese Academy Awards. The film also won Best Editing and Best Music Score at the Japanese Academy Awards.

=== Home media ===
The film has been released in the UK on DVD and Blu-ray by Third Window Films.

== Awards ==
2007 1st Asian Film Awards - Best Actress Miki Nakatani, Best visual effect, Masahide Yanagawase, Best arts direct, Towako Kuwashima

2007 Japanese Academy Award Winner - Best Actress, Best Music, Best Editing

2006 Japanese Professional Movie Award Winner - Best Actress

== Notes ==
=== References ===
- Galbraith IV, Stuart (2008). The Toho Studios Story: A History and Complete Filmography. Scarecrow Press. ISBN 978-1461673743.
