= Atsuro Watabe =

Japanese actor (born 1968)

- 渡部 篤郎
- Born: 5 May 1968 (age 58); Shinjuku, Tokyo, Japan
- Occupation: Actor
- Years active: 1987–present
- Notable credit: Keizoku
- Spouses: Rikako Murakami (m. 1994; div. 2005); Unnamed (m. 2016)
- Children: 2

Atsuro Watabe (渡部 篤郎, Watabe Atsurō; born 5 May 1968) is a Japanese actor.

== Career ==
Born in Shinjuku-ku, Tokyo, Watabe debuted as an actor on television in 1991 with the drama Seishun no mon. He won awards of excellence in the best actor and new face categories at the 19th Japan Academy Prize in 1996 for the film Shizukana seikatsu, Juzo Itami's adaptation of his brother-in-law Kenzaburō Ōe's novel.

== Filmography ==
=== Movies ===
- A Quiet Life (1995)
- To Love (1997), Tsutomu Yoshioka
- Zebraman (2004), Oikawa
- Love Exposure (2008), Tetsu Honda
- Professor Layton and the Eternal Diva (2009), Jean Descole (voice)
- The Flowers of War (2011), Colonel Hasegawa
- Masquerade Hotel (2019), Inagaki
- Daughter of Lupin the Movie (2021), Takeru Mikumo
- Masquerade Night (2021), Inagaki
- Suzuki=Bakudan (2025), Kiyomiya
- New Interpretation of the End of Edo Period (2025), Katsu Kaishū

=== Television ===
- Mōri Motonari (1997), Mōri Okimoto
- Unsolved Cases (1999), Tōru Mayama
- Beautiful Life (2000), Masao Machida
- Hōjō Tokimune (2001), Hōjō Tokisuke
- Rookies (2008), Minoru Yoshida
- Gaiji Keisatsu (2008), Kenji Sumimoto
- Bitter Blood (2014), Akimura Shimao
- The Unbrokwn (2016), Shiro Gyoten
- On (2016), Iwao Atsuta
- Signal (2018)
- Daughter of Lupin (2019–20), Takeru Mikumo
- What Will You Do, Ieyasu? (2023), Sekiguchi Ujizumi
- Seasoned Connections (2023), Zenjirō Nakae
- I Wanna Punch That Scumbag! (2024), Nari Hanegi
- Happy Kanako's Killer Life (2025), Assassin Company President
- Dr. Ashura (2025), Makoto Tamon
- Blossom (2026), Kiyoji Hano
- Plastic Beauty (2026), Toyama

=== Video games ===
- Professor Layton and the Last Specter (2009), Jean Descole
- Professor Layton and the Miracle Mask (2011), Jean Descole
- Professor Layton and the Azran Legacy (2013), Desmond Sycamore, Jean Descole

=== Dubbing ===
- Hoppers (2026), Jerry Generazzo
