= Yumie =

- Gender: Female

Origin
- Origin: Japanese
- Meaning: Different meanings depending on the kanji used

Yumie (written: 弓枝 or 弓絵) is a feminine Japanese given name. Notable people with the name include:

- Yumie Funayama (船山 弓枝; born 1978), Japanese curler
- Yumie Hiraiwa (平岩 弓枝; born 1932), Japanese writer
- Yumie Nishiogi (西荻 弓絵; born 1960), Japanese screenwriter
- Yumie Kobayashi (born 1977), Japanese luger
