= Chinese Dinner =

- Film poster
- Directed by: Yukihiko Tsutsumi
- Screenplay by: Manabu Kato; Michizō Kitō
- Produced by: Susumu Nakazawa; Norio Watanabe; Yumi Yokoo
- Starring: Toshirō Yanagiba; Izam; Suirei
- Cinematography: Satoru Karasawa
- Edited by: Soichi Ueno
- Music by: Akira Mitake
- Production company: Pony Canyon
- Distributed by: Pony Canyon
- Release date: March 16, 2001 (Japan)
- Running time: 78 minutes
- Country: Japan
- Language: Japanese

Chinese Dinner (Japanese: チャイニーズ・ディナー, Hepburn: Chainizu dina) is a 2001 Japanese crime thriller film directed by Yukihiko Tsutsumi and written by Manabu Kato and Michizō Kitō. It is a single-location thriller starring Toshirō Yanagiba as the yakuza-connected owner of a Chinese restaurant held hostage by a hitman in his own establishment. The film co-stars Izam and Suirei. Chinese Dinner was theatrically released by Pony Canyon on March 16, 2001, in Japan. The film's theme song is "Nagi" by Minako Yoshida.

== Premise ==
Ryuichi Hoshino, the corrupt, yakuza-connected owner of a high-end Chinese restaurant, sits down in his private room for a multicourse dinner. He is celebrating a recently brokered money laundering deal that will increase his wealth substantially. However, before the first course is brought out, a mysterious dreadlocked man emerges from the shadows. Brandishing a gun, the man sits down opposite Hoshino and asks when dinner will be served. Rather than killing him, the man taunts Hoshino to guess his identity and motivations. As the night drags on and tension mounts, Hoshino tries to figure out the identity of the man and escape the situation with his life.

== Cast ==
- Toshirō Yanagiba as Ryuichi Hoshino
- Izam as Mysterious Man
- Suirei as Waitress

== Release ==
Chinese Dinner was theatrically released by Pony Canyon on March 16, 2001, in Japan.

== Reception ==
In a review for Midnight Eye, Tom Mes wrote, "Like his recent low-profile festival stunner 2LDK, Yukihiko Tsutsumi's Chinese Dinner essentially revolves around two people in one room. A setting that is much maligned for being either too theatrical or the situation of choice for untalented film students, in the hands of this particular director it quite successfully transcends its own limitations." He also commented, "At 78 minutes Chinese Dinner knows exactly how far to take its simple premise, but as a whole it's not nearly as hefty as the sumptuous dishes it presents on screen (which, incidentally, are all listed in the closing credits as cast members). More a tastefully decorated starter than a full-course meal, in other words."

A 2023 review for Onderhond.com stated, "The premise is extremely basic, but Tsutsumi has a lot of fun with the characters and the mystery behind the hit. The performances are solid, the styling is efficient and the film never gets boring, even when not much is effectively happening. It proved to be a perfect exercise for 2LDK, which serves a better build-up and a more satisfying ending. Chinese Dinner is a very entertaining flick in its own right though."
