= Raita Ryū =

Japanese actor

- 竜 雷太
- Born: Tatsuo Hasegawa; January 21, 1940 (age 86); Minoh, Osaka, Japan
- Occupation: Actor
- Years active: 1962–present
- Agent: Art Promotion
- Family: Yōhei Hasegawa (son)
- Website: www.art-promotion.jp/prof_male01_ryu.html

Raita Ryu (竜 雷太, Ryū Raita; born January 21, 1940 in Osaka as Tatsuo Hasegawa (長谷川 龍男, Hasegawa Tatsuo)) is a Japanese actor. He is well known for his role as Gorisan (Detective Ishizuka) in Taiyō ni Hoero!. He has a son Yōhei Hasegawa (長谷川 陽平, Hasegawa Yōhei), who is a musician and guitarist.

Once, he belonged to Toshiro Mifune's production company.

== Selected filmography ==
=== Films ===
- Moero! Seishun (1968) - Raita Ejima
- The Bullet Train (1975) - Kikuchi
- Stage-Struck Tora-san (1978) - Detective Hashikawa
- G.I. Samurai (1979) - Haruhisa Kimura
- Station (1981)
- Sukkari... sono ki de! (1981) - Detective
- Kizudarake no Kunshō (1986) - Toshima
- Tokyo Blackout (1987) - Horie
- Kanbakku (1990)
- Isan Sōzoku (1990) - Motoharu Fujishima
- Rainbow Kids (1991) - Sakuma
- Tsuribaka Nisshi (1994–1998) - Chief of Personnel Haraguchi
- Oishinbo (1996)
- Hana no oedo no Tsuribaka Nisshi (1998)
- Keizoku: The Movie (2000) - Kōtarō Nonomura
- Happily Ever After (2007)
- 20th Century Boys 1: Beginning of the End (2008) - Chō-san
- First Love: A Memory in Summer (2009)
- Hanjiro (2010)
- Homecoming (2011) - Tadashi Ohshima
- SPEC: Ten (2012) - Kotaro Nonomura
- SPEC: Close (2013) - Nonomura Kotaro
- A Banana? At This Time of Night? (2018) - Kiyoshi Kano
- We Make Antiques! Kyoto Rendezvous (2019) - Manzo Okuno
- Hope (2020)
- Food Luck (2020)
- What Happened to Our Nest Egg!? (2021)

=== Television ===
- Taiyō ni Hoero! (1972–1982) - Ishizuka "Gori-san" Makoto
- Tokugawa Ieyasu (1983) - Tenkai
- Sanada Taiheiki (1985–1986) - Katō Kiyomasa
- Byakkotai (1986) - Yamamoto Kakuma
- Dokuganryū Masamune (1987) - Date Sanemoto
- Abare Hasshū Goyō Tabi (1991–1994)
- Hoshi no Kinka (1996) - Seiichirō Nagai
- Unsolved Cases (1999) - Kōtarō Nonomura
- Aoi (2000) - Gamō Satoie
- Kokoro (2003) - Ikkoku Nakajima
- The Man Who Can't Get Married (2006)
- Fūrin Kazan (2007) - Amari Torayasu
- Teppan (2010–2011) - Den Hasegawa
- Gunshi Kanbei (2015) - Kuroda Shigetaka
- Segodon (2018) - Zusho Hirosato
- Ōoku: The Inner Chambers (2023) - Keishō-in
