= List of Professor Layton media =

The Professor Layton video game series is a franchise of puzzle games produced and developed by Level-5. Some games of this franchise were published by Nintendo outside Japan. The series is primarily based on games for the Nintendo DS and Nintendo 3DS systems. It debuted on February 15, 2007, with Reiton-kyōju to Fushigi na Machi (レイトン教授と不思議な町; Professor Layton and the Mysterious Village), eventually localized as Professor Layton and the Curious Village in the North American and PAL regions.

The series focuses on Professor Hershel Layton, an archaeologist, and his apprentice, Luke Triton, and their investigations into various mysterious towns. Often, they encounter people who require the player to solve puzzles or brain teasers in exchange for small trinkets or picarats. The trinkets or picarats is the score system used within the games. Currently there are six games in the main series, all of which have been released outside Japan. Additionally, there have been three novels as well as an animated movie, Professor Layton and the Eternal Diva. The series has been financially successful, with over 15 million units having been shipped of the games alone. The idea for the franchise was conceived by Akihiro Hino, and was originally intended to be a successor to Nintendo's Brain Age series.

== Video games ==
=== Main series ===
Game	Details
Professor Layton and the Curious Village Original release date(s): JP: February 15, 2007; NA: February 10, 2008; EU: November 7, 2008; AU: April 10, 2008	Release years by system: 2007 - Nintendo DS; 2008 - Mobile phone
Professor Layton and the Curious Village Original release date(s): JP: February 15, 2007; NA: February 10, 2008; EU: November 7, 2008; AU: April 10, 2008	Notes: Known in Japan as Reiton-kyōju to Fushigi na Machi (レイトン教授と不思議な町; Professor Layton and the Mysterious Village).; The game contains 135 puzzles, not including those downloaded online.; A password found in Professor Layton and the Diabolical Box gives access to concept art.; Mobile phone version released in Japan in May 2008.; Set between the events of Professor Layton and the Azran Legacy and Professor Layton and the Diabolical Box.
Professor Layton and the Diabolical Box Original release date(s): JP: November 29, 2007; NA: August 24, 2009; EU: September 25, 2009; AU: September 24, 2009; KOR: September 8, 2011	Release years by system: 2007 - Nintendo DS
Professor Layton and the Diabolical Box Original release date(s): JP: November 29, 2007; NA: August 24, 2009; EU: September 25, 2009; AU: September 24, 2009; KOR: September 8, 2011	Notes: Known in Japan as Reiton-kyōju to Akuma no Hako (レイトン教授と悪魔の箱; Professor Layton and the Devil's Box).; Known in PAL regions as Professor Layton and Pandora's Box.; The game contains 153 puzzles, not including those downloaded online.; A password found in Professor Layton and the Curious Village provides a bonus puzzle.; A password found in Professor Layton and the Unwound Future gives access to concept art.; Set between the events of Professor Layton and the Curious Village and Professor Layton and the Unwound Future.
Professor Layton and the Unwound Future Original release date(s): JP: November 27, 2008; NA: September 12, 2010; EU: October 21, 2010; AU: October 21, 2010	Release years by system: 2008 - Nintendo DS
Professor Layton and the Unwound Future Original release date(s): JP: November 27, 2008; NA: September 12, 2010; EU: October 21, 2010; AU: October 21, 2010	Notes: Known in Japan as Reiton-kyōju to Saigo no Jikan Ryokō (レイトン教授と最後の時間旅行; Professor Layton and the Last Time Travel).; Known in PAL regions as Professor Layton and the Lost Future.; The game contains 168 puzzles, not including those downloaded online.; A password found in Professor Layton and the Diabolical Box provides a bonus puzzle.; Set after the events of Professor Layton and the Diabolical Box.
Professor Layton and the Last Specter Original release date(s): JP: November 26, 2009; NA: October 17, 2011; EU: November 25, 2011	Release years by system: 2009 - Nintendo DS
Professor Layton and the Last Specter Original release date(s): JP: November 26, 2009; NA: October 17, 2011; EU: November 25, 2011	Notes: Known in Japan as Reiton-kyōju to Majin no Fue (レイトン教授と魔神の笛; Professor Layton and the Devil's Flute).; Known in PAL regions as Professor Layton and the Spectre's Call.; A prequel to the Professor Layton series, set three years prior to the events of Professor Layton and the Curious Village.; The game contains 170 puzzles, not including those downloaded online.; Also includes a 100-hour RPG known as Professor Layton's London Life in the Japanese, North American, and Australian versions.; London Life is known in Japan as Reiton-kyōju no Rondon Raifu (レイトン教授のロンドンライフ; Professor Layton's London Life).
Professor Layton and the Miracle Mask Original release date(s): JP: February 26, 2011; EU: October 26, 2012; NA: October 28, 2012	Release years by system: 2011 - Nintendo 3DS
Professor Layton and the Miracle Mask Original release date(s): JP: February 26, 2011; EU: October 26, 2012; NA: October 28, 2012	Notes: Known in Japan as Reiton-kyōju to Kiseki no Kamen (レイトン教授と奇跡の仮面; Professor Layton and the Mask of Miracles).; Set between the events of Professor Layton and the Eternal Diva and professor Layton and the Azran Legacy.
Professor Layton and the Azran Legacy Original release date(s): JP: February 28, 2013; EU: November 8, 2013; NA: February 28, 2014	Release years by system: 2013 - Nintendo 3DS
Professor Layton and the Azran Legacy Original release date(s): JP: February 28, 2013; EU: November 8, 2013; NA: February 28, 2014	Notes: Known in Japan as Reiton-kyōju to Chō-Bunmei Ē no Isan (レイトン教授と超文明Aの遺産; Professor Layton and the Legacy of Super Civilization A).; Set between the events of Professor Layton and the Miracle Mask and Professor Layton and the Curious Village.
Layton's Mystery Journey: Katrielle and the Millionaires' Conspiracy Original release date(s): JP: July 20, 2017; NA/PAL: July 20, 2017 (iOS, Android) October 6, 2017 (Nintendo 3DS) November 8, 2019 (Nintendo Switch)	Release years by system: 2017 - Nintendo 3DS, iOS, Android, Nintendo Switch
Layton's Mystery Journey: Katrielle and the Millionaires' Conspiracy Original release date(s): JP: July 20, 2017; NA/PAL: July 20, 2017 (iOS, Android) October 6, 2017 (Nintendo 3DS) November 8, 2019 (Nintendo Switch)	Notes: Known in Japan as Reiton Misuterī Jānī: Katorīeiru to Dai Fugō no Inbō (レイトン ミステリージャーニー カトリーエイルと大富豪の陰謀).

=== Crossover games ===
Game	Details
Professor Layton Royale Original release date(s): JP: November 1, 2011; NA: TBA; EU: TBA	Release years by system: 2011 - Mobile phone
Professor Layton Royale Original release date(s): JP: November 1, 2011; NA: TBA; EU: TBA	Notes: Known in Japan as Reiton-kyōju Rowaiyaru (レイトン教授 ロワイヤル; Royal Professor Layton).; Crossover game based on DeNA's Royale series of social games.
Professor Layton vs. Phoenix Wright: Ace Attorney Original release date(s): JP: November 29, 2012; EU: March 28, 2014; NA: August 29, 2014	Release years by system: 2012 - Nintendo 3DS
Professor Layton vs. Phoenix Wright: Ace Attorney Original release date(s): JP: November 29, 2012; EU: March 28, 2014; NA: August 29, 2014	Notes: Known in Japan as Reiton-kyōju VS Gyakuten Saiban (レイトン教授 VS 逆転裁判; Professor Layton vs. Turnabout Trial).; Crossover game featuring the protagonists from the Professor Layton and Ace Attorney series.

=== Other games ===
Game	Details
Layton-kyōju to Rondon no Kyūjitsu Original release date(s): JP: September 21, 2007	Release years by system: 2007 - Nintendo DS
Layton-kyōju to Rondon no Kyūjitsu Original release date(s): JP: September 21, 2007	Notes: Known in Japan as Reiton-kyōju to Rondon no Kyūjitsu (レイトン教授とロンドンの休日; Professor Layton's London Holiday).; Included as a demo in the promotional Level-5 Premium Silver collection, given away at Tokyo Game Show 2007.
Professor Layton and the Mansion of the Deathly Mirror Original release date(s): JP: October 10, 2008	Release years by system: 2008 - Mobile phone
Professor Layton and the Mansion of the Deathly Mirror Original release date(s): JP: October 10, 2008	Notes: Known in Japan as Reiton-kyōju to Shi-kyō no kan (レイトン教授と死鏡の館; Professor Layton and the Mansion of the Deathly Mirror).
Layton Brothers: Mystery Room Original release date(s): JP: September 21, 2012; EU: June 27, 2013; NA: June 27, 2013	Release years by system: 2012 - iOS and Android
Layton Brothers: Mystery Room Original release date(s): JP: September 21, 2012; EU: June 27, 2013; NA: June 27, 2013	Notes: Known in Japan as Reiton Burazāzu Misuterī Rūmu (レイトンブラザーズ・ミステリールーム; Layton Brothers Mystery Room).; Originally conceived as Mystery Room (in Japan, Misuterī Rūmu (ミステリールーム; Mystery Room)), a title in the Atamania series.; The main character is Professor Layton's son, Alfendi Layton.

== Other media ==
=== Animated movies ===
Game	Details
Professor Layton and the Eternal Diva Original release date(s): JP: December 19, 2009; EU: October 18, 2010; NA: November 8, 2011	Release years by system: 2009 - Animated film
Professor Layton and the Eternal Diva Original release date(s): JP: December 19, 2009; EU: October 18, 2010; NA: November 8, 2011	Notes: Known in Japan as Reiton-kyōju to Eien no Utahime (レイトン教授と永遠の歌姫; Professor Layton and the Eternal Diva).; Also known as Professor Layton: The First Movie.; Set between the events of Professor Layton and the Last Specter and Professor Layton and the Miracle Mask.; Has a running time of 97 minutes.

=== Printed media ===
==== Novels ====
Title	Release date	ISBN	Media type
Layton-kyōju to Samayoeru Shiro	December 19, 2008	ISBN 978-4-09-289717-5	Novelization
Notes: Known in Japan as Reiton-kyōju to Samayoeru Shiro (レイトン教授とさまよえる城; Professor Layton and the Wandering Castle).; The novel is 320 pages long.
Layton-kyōju to Kaijin Goddo	December 16, 2009	ISBN 978-4-09-289724-3	Novelization
Notes: Known in Japan as Reiton-kyōju to Kaijin Goddo (レイトン教授と怪人ゴッド; Professor Layton and the Phantom Deity).; The novel is 324 pages long.
Layton-kyōju to Gen'ei no Mori	December 15, 2010	ISBN 978-4-09-289729-8	Novelization
Notes: Known in Japan as Reiton-kyōju to Gen'ei no Mori (レイトン教授と幻影の森; Professor Layton and the Illusory Forest).; The novel is 324 pages long.

==== Manga ====
Title	Release date	ISBN	Media type
Layton-kyōju to Yukai na Jiken	Vol. 1 - November 27, 2008; Vol. 2 - November 27, 2009; Vol. 3 - November 26, 2010	Vol. 1 - ISBN 978-4-09-140768-9; Vol. 2 - ISBN 978-4-09-140859-4; Vol. 3 - ISBN 978-4-09-141144-0	Manga
Notes: Known in Japan as Reiton-kyōju to Yukai na Jiken (レイトン教授とユカイな事件; Professor Layton and the Cheerful Mystery).; Three volumes published from 2008 to 2010
Layton-kyōju to Mayoi no Mori	December 11, 2009	ISBN 978-4-09-140883-9	Manga
Notes: Known in Japan as Reiton-kyōju to Mayoi no Mori (レイトン教授と迷いの森; Professor Layton and the Lost Forest).

=== Soundtracks ===
Title	Release date	Length	Label
Professor Layton Main Theme Trilogy CD	November 27, 2008	7:30	Level-5
Professor Layton and the Curious Village Original Soundtrack	December 24, 2008	1:15:48	FRAME
Professor Layton and the Diabolical Box Original Soundtrack	December 24, 2008	1:14:14	FRAME
Professor Layton and the Unwound Future Original Soundtrack	January 21, 2009	1:12:31	FRAME
Professor Layton Series Soundtrack Premium CD	January 21, 2009	4:15	FRAME
Professor Layton and the Last Specter Original Soundtrack	December 16, 2009	1:04:28	FRAME
The Eternal Diva / Janice Quatlane	December 16, 2009	19:13	Pony Canyon
Professor Layton and the Eternal Diva Original Soundtrack	January 23, 2010	1:02:36	FRAME
"Professor Layton VS Gyakuten Saiban" Original Soundtrack with Special Anime Film	November 29, 2012	9:23	Level 5
Professor Layton vs. Phoenix Wright: Ace Attorney Magical Mystery Music	April 10, 2013	2:55:04	Suleputer
