= Shokumotsu Rensa =

Studio album by Miki Nakatani
- Released: September 4, 1996
- Recorded: 1996
- Genre: Pop
- Length: 55:42
- Label: For Life Records
- Producer: Ryuichi Sakamoto

Miki Nakatani chronology
Shokumotsu Rensa (1996)	Cure (1997)

Singles from Shokumotsu Rensa
- 1. "Mind Circus" Released: May 17, 1996; 2. "Strange Paradise" Released: July 19, 1996

Shokumotsu Rensa (Japanese: 食物連鎖; lit. "Food Chain") is the debut studio album by Japanese singer Miki Nakatani. It was released on September 4, 1996, by For Life Records. A former girl group member, Nakatani concentrated on her acting career before returning to music in partnership with musician Ryuichi Sakamoto.

Nakatani was praised for her "cool" vocal performance on Shokumotsu Rensa, and critics made note of the album's diversity and sense of "mystery". It features contributions from Taeko Onuki, Yasuharu Konishi of Pizzicato Five, Vinicius Cantuária, and Arto Lindsay. The album was preceded by two singles: "Mind Circus" and "Strange Paradise". Shokumotsu Rensa peaked at number five on the Oricon charts and is her best-selling album.

== Background ==
Nakatani began her career as a member of the girl group Sakurakko Club in 1991, performing with the group for two years. After her departure, she released the single "Anata ga Wakaranai" (あなたがわからない) in 1993, which saw little success. Nakatani began focusing efforts on her acting career, and gained wide exposure after starring in commercials for Nippon Oil.

Nakatani met renowned producer Ryuichi Sakamoto by chance, and the two hit it off after learning that their interests matched. Nakatani herself had always been a fan of Sakamoto's music, and frequently attended his concerts, saying, "I thought he was always sensitive to new things and had a lot to offer, so I became a big fan." She was subsequently signed onto Güt, a subsidiary of For Life Records and Sakamoto's own label, as their first female artist. Nakatani appeared on his 1995 album Smoochy, dueting on the song "Aishiteru, Aishitenai" (愛してる, 愛してない; transl. "Love You, Love You Not").

Sakamoto reportedly held a long-term desire to produce a female artist, and others opined that Nakatani saw it as an opportunity to dispel her idol image. Critics have compared their partnership to that of French musician Serge Gainsbourg and actress Jane Birkin. Since retiring from music in 2001, Nakatani later commented, "I wasn't a very good singer. I made records because I wanted to work with Ryuichi Sakamoto."

== Composition ==
Shokumotsu Rensa was produced by Sakamoto, who arranged nearly all of its songs and composed five. Primarily a pop album, it draws from a range of genres. The opener "Mind Circus" is a later addition to city pop with lyrics by Masao Urino, who was an influential figure in the genre. It makes use of modulations. Yasuharu Konishi contributed the acid jazz "Aibiki no Mori de" (逢いびきの森で), while the electropop "My Best of Love" was penned by Taeko Onuki. "Where the River Flows" is Japanese-styled, while "Tattoo" channels R&B and features the only lyrics written by Nakatani. A bossa nova influence can be heard on "Shikisai no Naka e" (色彩の中へ) and "Sorriso Escuro"; both credit Brazilian musician Vinicius Cantuária as a composer, while the latter was written with American musician Arto Lindsay and contains elements of ambient music. Elsewhere, "Strange Paradise" was remixed for inclusion on the album and references the 1985 Jean-Luc Godard film Hail Mary in its lyrics.

Nakatani commented, "What's so strange about Mr. Sakamoto's sound is that even though it contains a lot of mechanical and synth sounds, it is somehow not cold. On the other hand, when you play with an orchestra, it sounds raw, but it's kind of cold. I like the balance between the new and the old, and the balance between the warm and the cold."

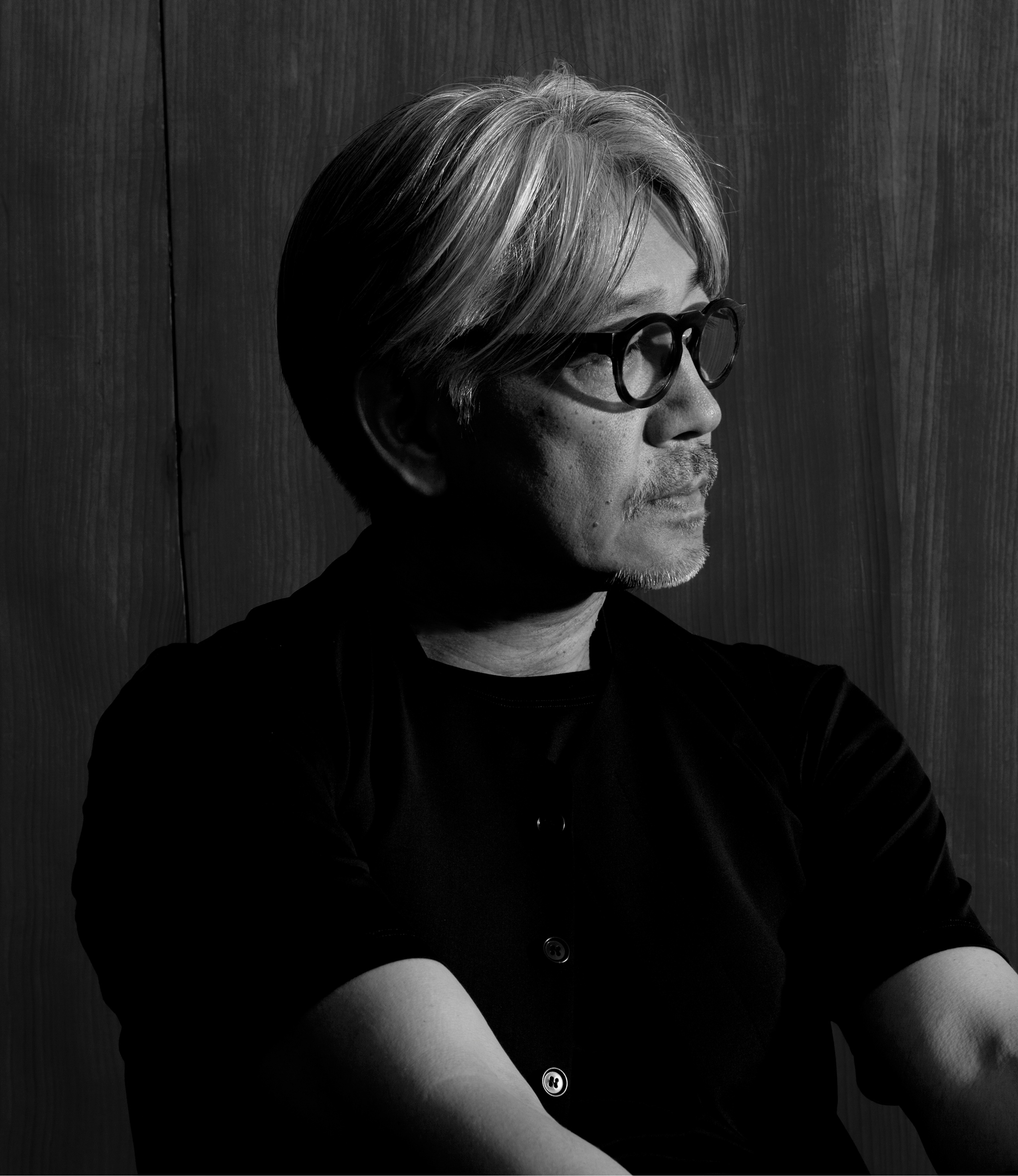
Ryuichi Sakamoto (pictured in 2013), the album's executive producer.

Masao Urino wrote the lyrics to five songs on Shokumotsu Rensa. Pressuring himself to match the quality of Sakamoto's "imposing" arrangements, Urino spent a month working on each song. He reflected on their collaboration with fondness as Sakamoto gave him a newfound confidence to write with "instinct". Their partnership began with "Mind Circus", where Sakamoto showed him a picture of British supermodel Kate Moss and said, "Look at this and write whatever your instinct tells you to write." The line "boyishness is a wound, but it's your knife" references the Charles Baudelaire poem "L'Héautontimorouménos" from his collection, Les Fleurs du mal (1867). Urino counts his work with Nakatani as among his favorites.

The album title was chosen at Sakamoto's suggestion. In an interview with Tomomi Kahala, Nakatani conveyed that Sakamoto saw her at the top of a food chain: "I thought, am I some kind of food chain pyramid? I was under the impression that I would be at the bottom of the pyramid with all these great artists, including Mr. Sakamoto, providing me with their songs. [...] But, according to Mr. Sakamoto, 'Miki Nakatani eats and eats and eats men and women.'" Takeshima noted that Sakamoto brought out a unisex appeal to Nakatani.

== Release and promotion ==
Shokumotsu Rensa was released on September 4, 1996, through For Life Records and Güt. The cover photograph for the album was taken by Kazunali Tajima, who became a frequent collaborator of Nakatani's. The artwork positions the singer against a backdrop of red curtains, with Nakatani gazing into the distance. Ryutaro Amano of Mikiki noted the cover for its "melancholic" quality.

"Mind Circus" was the first single issued from Shokumotsu Rensa on May 17, 1996. It peaked at number twenty on the Oricon and charted for a total of eleven weeks. It played on the Nippon TV drama Oretachi ni Ki wo Tsukero with Nakatani in a lead role. "Strange Paradise" was released as the second single on July 19, 1996, peaking at number thirty and charting for nine weeks. It was used in Nakatani's commercials for a green tea beverage by Ito En.

Shokumotsu Rensa peaked at number five on the Oricon, charting for a total of seven weeks. It ranked at number eight on the Hits of the World Japanese albums chart published by Billboard for the week of September 16, 1996. The album was promoted through a live concert at Club Quattro in Shibuya on February 26 and 27, 1997. Nakatani performed seven songs from the album, including "Aishiteru, Aishitenai" and the then-unreleased "Suna no Kajitsu" (砂の果実). It was filmed and published under the title Butterfish on March 21, 1997, her first and only live release to date.

== Critical reception ==
Shokumotsu Rensa was met with generally positive reviews from music critics. Tower Records commended the mysterious atmosphere that Nakatani brings to the album, naming it a transcendent masterpiece. Tomoyuki Mori of Real Sound called it a "chic pop album where restraint and sophistication coexist", while CD Journal highlighted the "gorgeous" contributions by Onuki and Konishi. They opined that Naktani sang in an "ultra-cool style", and furthered compared her to singer Tomomi Kahala.

Writing for Pop Master, Rui Takeshima noted the album's lyrical complexities and felt that Nakatani's vocals had a clear quality to it, "as if she had just stepped out of a sterile room, without pretense". After Sakamoto's passing in 2023, a retrospective piece in Vogue Japan by editor Toru Mitani echoed this sentiment, where Nakatani's debut "exuded a sense of transparency and divinity". They likened her to a mysterious "vessel" in accepting beautiful melodies, and contrasted Nakatani with her contemporary, the Tetsuya Komuro-produced Namie Amuro. Mitani ended their column with an overview of Nakatani's work with Sakamoto, calling them monuments of "music by actors".

Hideki Hamaguchi of Otonano felt that the Sakamoto–Nakatani partnership established a unique world in Shokumotsu Rensa, crediting Sakamoto for its mysterious and artistic sensibility, and Nakatani for her "inorganic" vocals that matched the "innocent worldview" pervading the album. They praised Shokumotsu Rensa for its experimentation and diversity in music styles.

As part of a feature evaluating Japanese actresses' forgotten music careers in Cyzo magazine, "Mind Circus" was well regarded and one of the few not to be given a negative "dark past" or kurorekishi (黒歴史) rating. Nakatani's relaxed vocals were praised and "Mind Circus" was commended because it was neither a song that relied purely on atmospherics, nor a song that required diva stylings.

== Track listing ==
All songs composed and arranged by Ryuichi Sakamoto except where noted.

No.	Title	Lyrics	Music	Arrangement	Length
1.	"Mind Circus"	Masao Urino			5:16
2.	"Strange Paradise (Paradise Mix)"	Urino			6:13
3.	"Aibiki no Mori de" (逢いびきの森で "In the Forest of Encounters")	Yasuharu Konishi	Konishi	Konishi	5:26
4.	"Yogoreta Ashi The Silence of Innocence" (汚れた脚 "Dirty Legs")	Urino			6:01
5.	"My Best of Love"	Taeko Onuki	Onuki		5:03
6.	"Where the River Flows"	Urino			6:44
7.	"Tattoo"	Miki Nakatani			6:02
8.	"Shikisai no Naka e" (色彩の中へ "Into the Colors")	Hiroshi Takano	Vinicius Cantuária		5:58
9.	"Lunar Fever"	Takano	Toshiko Mori	Mori	4:30
10.	"Sorriso Escuro"	Urino, Arto Lindsay, Cantuária	Lindsay, Cantuária		4:24

- Tracks 1, 2, 6, 7, and 9 are stylized in all uppercase.
- Tracks 5 and 10 are stylized in all lowercase.

== Charts and sales ==
Chart (1996)	Peak position	Sales
Oricon Weekly Albums	5	131,000
