= Initiation Love =

2015 Japanese film by Yukihiko Tsutsumi

- Poster
- イニシエーション・ラブ
- Directed by: Yukihiko Tsutsumi
- Screenplay by: Tete Inoue
- Based on: Initiation Love by Kurumi Inui
- Produced by: Miho Kobayashi; Naoto Hatakeyama
- Starring: Atsuko Maeda; Shota Matsuda; Fumino Kimura
- Edited by: Nobuyuki Ito
- Music by: Gabriele Roberto
- Production companies: Initiation Love Film Partners; Nippon Television; Office Crescendo
- Distributed by: Toho
- Release date: May 23, 2015 (Japan)
- Running time: 110 minutes
- Country: Japan
- Language: Japanese
- Box office: ¥1.31 billion (Japan)

Initiation Love (Japanese: イニシエーション・ラブ, Hepburn: Inishiēshon rabu) is a Japanese romance film directed by Yukihiko Tsutsumi. It was released in Japan on May 23, 2015.

The film is based on a novel of the same name by Kurumi Inui.

== Plot ==
During the 80s in Japan, a college student named Suzuki falls in love with Mayu, a dental hygienist. But dreams beckon him to Tokyo, forcing their relationship to become a long-distance one. As he develops insecurities in their long distance arrangement, his relationship with Miyako, a colleague, begins blurring the lines of friendship and temptation. Under this strain on their relationship, Mayu and Suzuki begin drifting apart.

== Cast ==
- Atsuko Maeda as Mayuko "Mayu" Naruoka
- Kanro Morita as Suzuki from Side A
- Shota Matsuda as Suzuki (also known as Takkun)
- Fumino Kimura as Miyako Ishimaru
- Takahiro Miura as Kaido
- Tomoya Maeno
- Noritake Kinashi as Shizuoka Branch Manager
- Satomi Tezuka as Shiho Ishimaru
- Tsurutaro Kitaoka as Kouki Ishimaru
- Miyabi Matsuura as Natsuko
- Ayako Yoshitani as Yuko
- Ryô Satô as Madoka

== Reception ==
As of June 14, 2015, the film had grossed ¥1.05 billion at the Japanese box office.

On Film Business Asia, Derek Elley gave the film an 8 out of 10 and called it a "well-cast, slickly entertaining '80s rom-com [that] has more than just its Big Twist."
