= Akira Mitake =

Japanese composer

Akira Mitake (見岳 章; born November 11, 1956) is a Japanese composer from Tokyo. He is known for his collaborations with director Yukihiko Tsutsumi, including such films as Chinese Dinner (2001), 2LDK (2003), EGG (2005) and Taitei no Ken (2007).

Mitake composed "Kawa no nagare no yō ni" (川の流れのように), Like the Flow of the River, a song recorded by Japanese enka singer Hibari Misora.
