= Taitei no Ken =

- Film poster
- Directed by: Yukihiko Tsutsumi
- Screenplay by: Akira Amasawa
- Based on: Taitei no Ken by Baku Yumemakura
- Starring: Hiroshi Abe; Kenichi Endō; Masakatsu Funaki; Kyōko Hasegawa; Hirotaro Honda; Kankurō Kudō; Naomasa Musaka; Koji Ookura; Takashi Taniguchi
- Cinematography: Satoru Karasawa
- Music by: Akira Mitake
- Distributed by: Toei Company
- Release date: April 7, 2007 (Japan)
- Running time: 110 minutes
- Country: Japan
- Language: Japanese

Taitei no Ken (Japanese: 大帝の剣; lit. "The Emperor's Sword") (aka: The Sword of Alexander) is a series of novels by Baku Yumemakura. They blend samurai action with sci-fi elements. The first novel was adapted into a 2007 movie directed by Yukihiko Tsutsumi.

== Synopsis ==
Orichalcum is a rare and powerful material from a meteorite that was forged into three priceless artifacts. Those that can unite the three items are said to attain great power within the universe. Two conflicting alien forces fight and crash land in ancient Japan to get Orichalcum. Yorozu Genkurou, a samurai who managed to acquire the sword called "Taitei no Ken (The Sword of Alexander)" soon realizes its true potential as he battles ninjas and aliens that covet his life and sword.

== Cast ==
- Hiroshi Abe as Yorozu Genkurou
- Kyōko Hasegawa as Princess Mai / Ran
- Kankurō Kudō as Sasuke
- Meisa Kuroki as Botan
- Kenichi Endō as Gonzou
- Naomasa Musaka as Kuromushi
- Koji Ookura as Teduma no Touji
- Hirotarō Honda
- Masakatsu Funaki
- Takashi Taniguchi
