= Rahayu Supanggah =

Indonesian composer (1949–2020)

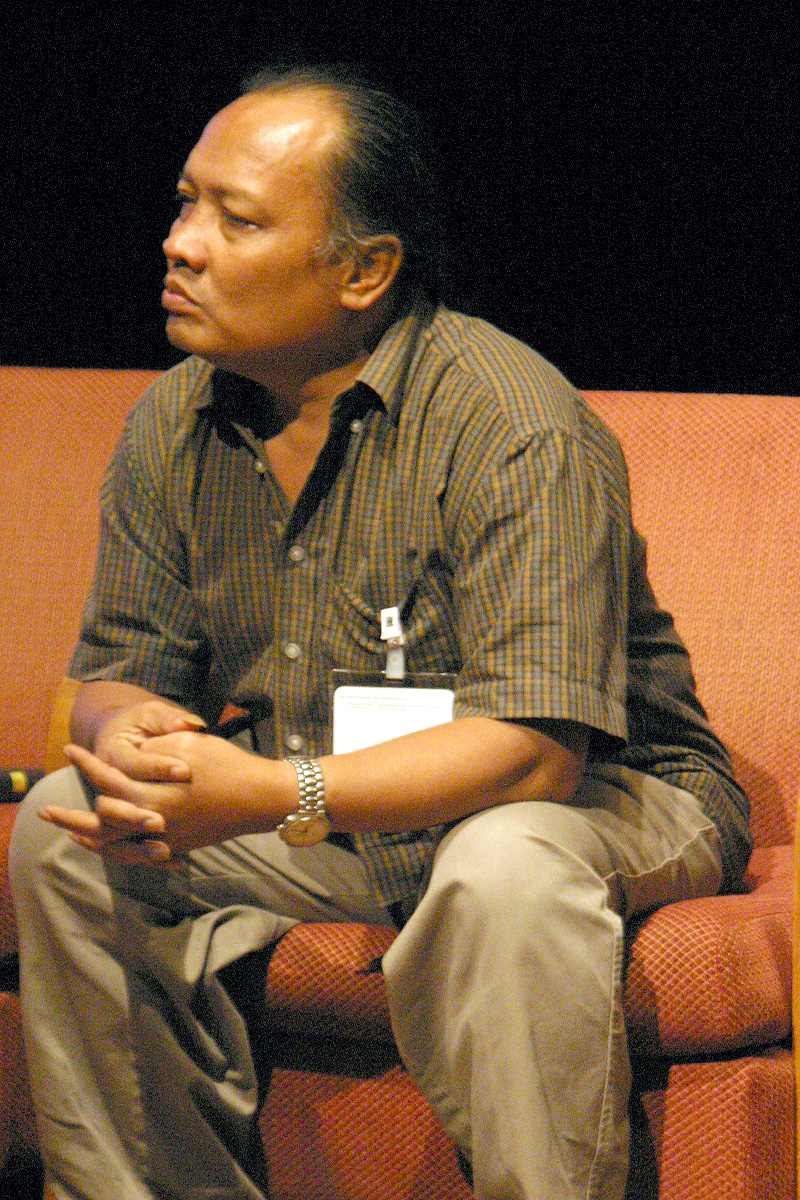
Rahayu Supanggah

Rahayu Supanggah (29 August 1949 – 10 November 2020) was an Indonesian composer.

== Career ==
Supanggah was born in Boyolali, and composed more than 100 pieces, but was known mostly for his part in the international collaboration Realizing Rama and the music score composed for Robert Wilson's I La Galigo. His compositions for Opera Jawa won the Asian Film Award in 2007. From 2007 onward, he was resident artist at the Southbank Centre, London. He worked together with the eccentric composer Slamet Abdul Sjukur. He died in Surakarta, aged 71.
