= The Big Bee =

- Poster
- 天空の蜂
- Directed by: Yukihiko Tsutsumi
- Screenplay by: Ichiro Kusuno
- Based on: Tenkū no Hachi by Keigo Higashino
- Produced by: Tadashi Ohsumi; Naoya Kinoshita; Kôhei Furukawa; Takeshi Sakamoto; Naoto Miyamoto
- Starring: Yōsuke Eguchi; Yukie Nakama; Gō Ayano; Jun Kunimura; Akira Emoto; Masahiro Motoki
- Cinematography: Satoru Karasawa
- Edited by: Nobuyuki Ito
- Music by: Richard Pryn
- Production company: "The Big Bee" Production Committee
- Distributed by: Shochiku
- Release date: September 12, 2015 (Japan)
- Running time: 139 minutes
- Country: Japan
- Language: Japanese
- Box office: ¥783 million

The Big Bee (Japanese: 天空の蜂, Hepburn: Tenkū no Hachi) is a 2015 Japanese thriller film directed by Yukihiko Tsutsumi and based on the novel of the same name by Keigo Higashino. It was released on September 12, 2015.

== Cast ==
- Yōsuke Eguchi
- Masahiro Motoki
- Yukie Nakama
- Gō Ayano
- Jun Kunimura
- Akira Emoto
- Ken Mitsuishi
- Renji Ishibashi

== Reception ==
The film grossed ¥161 million on its opening weekend and was number three at the box office.
