= I La Galigo =

- Music: Rahayu Supanggah
- Book: Rhoda Grauer
- Basis: La Galigo creation myth by creator of the original work
- Premiere: March 12, 2004: Esplanade – Theatres on the Bay, Singapore

I La Galigo is music theater work originally directed by Robert Wilson that has been shown since 2004 in Asia, Europe, Australia and the United States. It is based on an adaptation by Rhoda Grauer of the epic creation myth Sureq Galigo of the Bugis from South Sulawesi, written between the 13th and 15th century in the Indonesian language Buginese.

== Plot summary ==
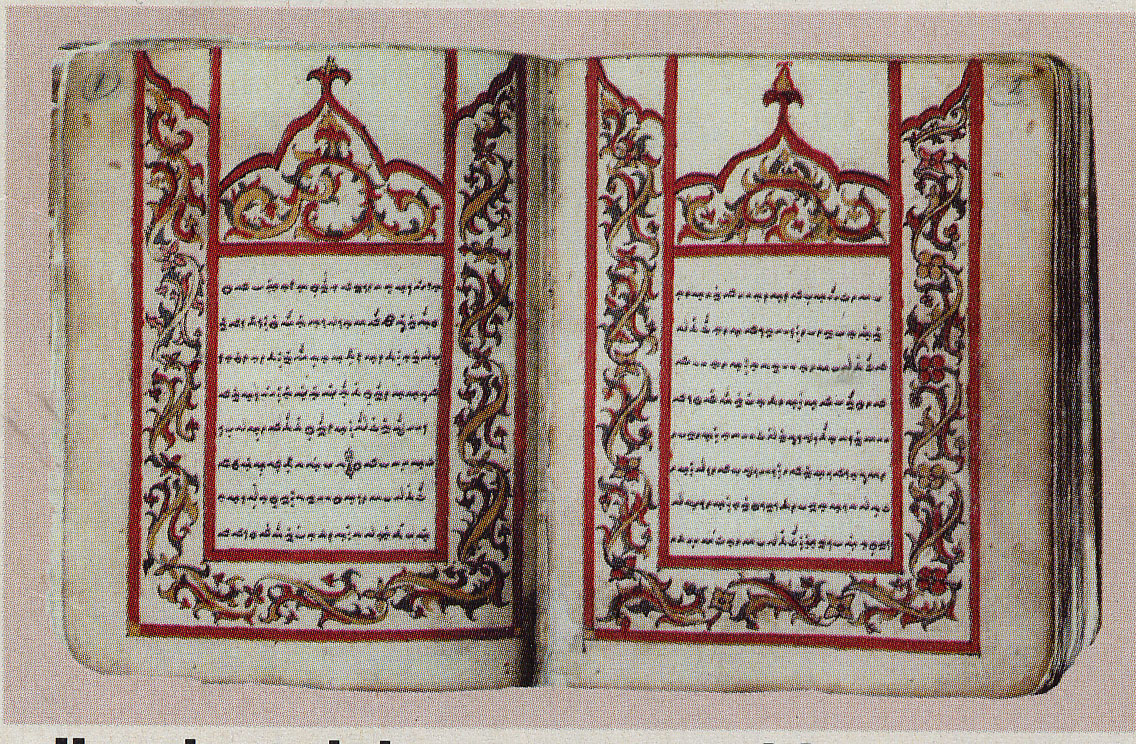
A 19th-century manuscript of La Galigo.

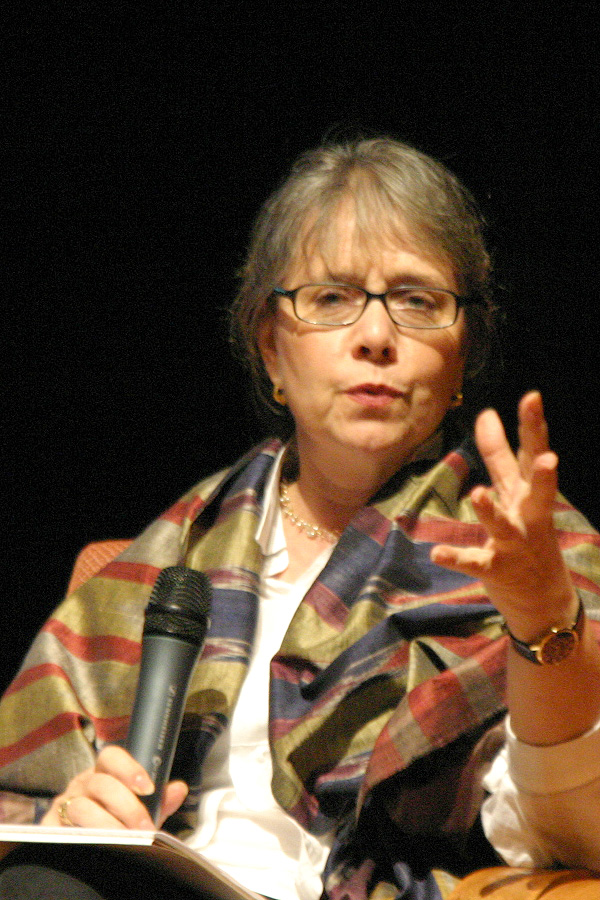
Writer Rhoda Grauer, who adapted the text into English.

Out of the vast material in Sureq Galigo, that covers the story of a so-called Middle World (that of humanity), the drama focuses on one particular narrative thread, about the warrior Sawerigading, and his twin sister, We Tenriabeng. They are descendants of the gods of the heavens and the gods of the underworld who send their offspring to inhabit the earth. From the time in the womb of their mother, which is put onto stage, they are destined to fall in love with each other. Worried that their incest would doom the world, the Bissu priests order them to be separated at birth. Sawerigading travels abroad but is eventually told about the world's most beautiful woman. He returns home and actually falls in love with his twin sister. To avoid the worst, We Tenriabeng introduces him to a woman of equal beauty, whom he marries to have a son named I La Galigo. Nevertheless, the earth is cleansed of all life another time and their children mate again to repopulate it and start a new era.

== Production ==
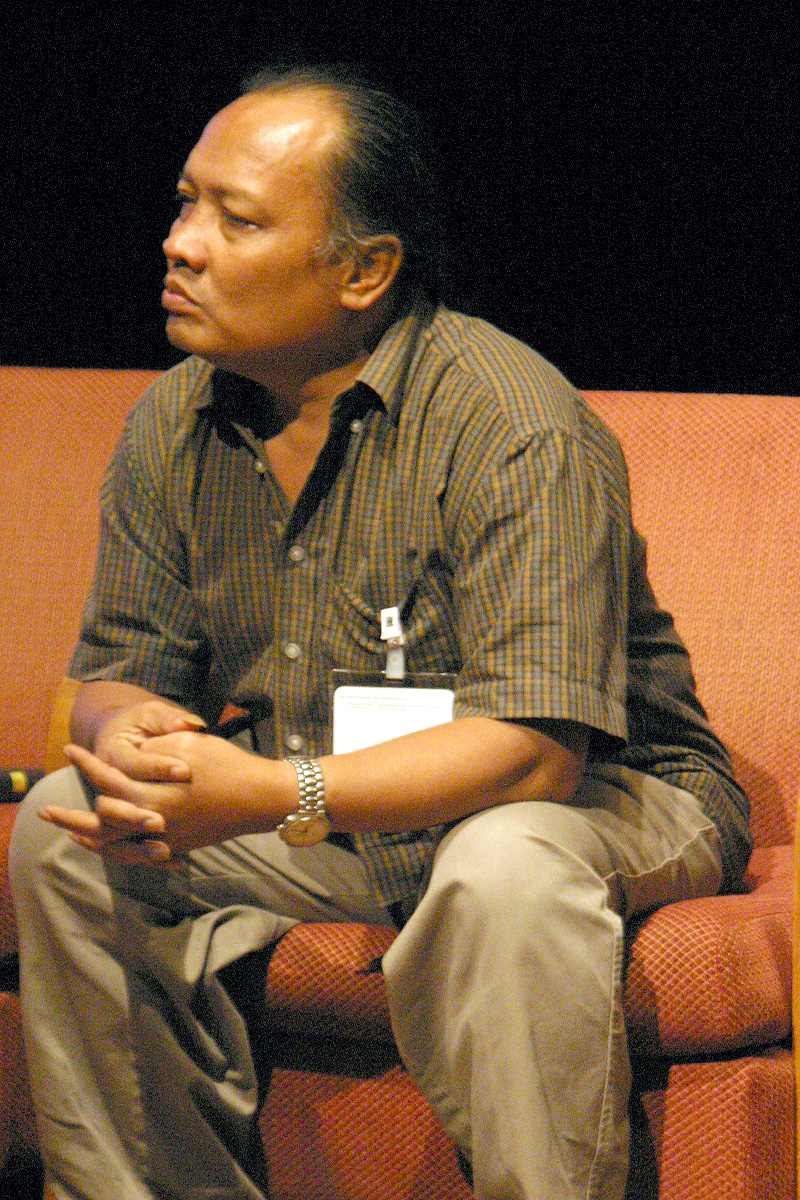
Composer Rahayu Supanggah.

While parts of the story are narrated, the actors are not speaking but expressing themselves through dance and gestures. The three-hour-long performance is accompanied extensively by light effects characteristic for Wilson's work and music by an onstage ensemble. Their music sounds traditional, but has actually been composed for the production by the Javanese composer Rahayu Supanggah after intensive research in South Sulawesi. For better dramatic expression, other Javanese and Balinese instruments were added to the initially five traditional Sulawesi instruments and new ones were made as well, amounting eventually to 70 instruments played by 12 musicians.

Rehearsals for I La Galigo began in workshops at The Watermill Center on Long Island, New York.

== Cast ==
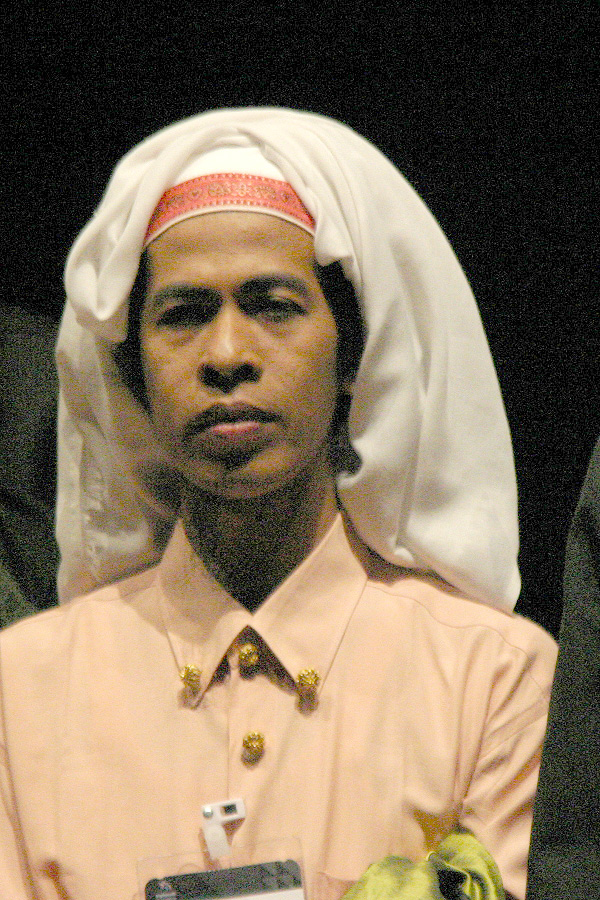
Bissu Puang Matoa Saidi.

The production cast consists of 53 musicians and dancers, exclusively from Indonesia and mostly from Sulawesi, as well as one of the few remaining bissu, Puang Matoa Saidi from the Bugis community, who narrates parts of the story.

== International performances ==
Performance History
Date	City	Venue	Reviews
12–13 March 2004	Singapore	Esplanade - Theatres on the Bay	
12–15 May 2004	Amsterdam	Het Muziektheater	
20–23 May 2004	Barcelona	Teatro Lliure	
30 May - 2 June 2004	Madrid	Teatro Español	
8–10 June 2004	Lyon	Les Nuits de Fourvière	
18–20 June 2004	Ravenna	Teatro Alighieri	
13–16 July 2005	New York City	New York State Theater	
10–12 December 2005	Jakarta	Teater Tanah Airku	
19–23 October 2006	Melbourne	State Theatre	
12–17 February 2008	Milan	Teatro degli Arcimboldi	
7–10 August 2008	Taipei	Taipei Culture Center	
23–24 April 2011	Makassar	Fort Rotterdam	
3–7 July 2019	Jakarta	Ciputra Artpreneur	

Finally for the first time I La Galigo performance in their home town, in Makassar the capital city of South Sulawesi, Indonesia. I La Galigo back to home after 6 years performance around the world.

== See also ==
- Coppong Daeng Rannu, a master of Makassar ethnic-group dances, best known as the Rice Goddess in I La Galigo
