= 1st Asian Film Awards =

2007 edition of award ceremony

- Awarded for: Excellence in Asian cinema
- Awarded by: Hong Kong International Film Festival
- Presented on: 20 March 2007
- Site: Hong Kong Convention and Exhibition Centre
- Official website: Asian Film Awards

Highlights
- Best Picture: The Host
- Best Direction: Jia Zhangke; Still Life
- Best Actor: Song Kang-ho; The Host
- Best Actress: Miki Nakatani; Memories of Matsuko
- Most awards: 4 - The Host
- Most nominations: 5 - The Host

The 1st Asian Film Awards were given on 20 March 2007 at the Hong Kong Convention and Exhibition Centre, on the opening night of the 31st Hong Kong International Film Festival.

Given to films released in 2006 by film industries from across Asia, awards were given in 10 categories: Best Film, Best Director, Best Actor, Best Actress, Best Screenwriter, Best Cinematographer, Best Production Designer, Best Composer, Best Editor and Best Visual Effects. Up to six nominees are honored in each category.

The most awards went to The Host, directed by Bong Joon-ho. It had been nominated in five categories and won four: Best Picture, Best Actor, Best Visual Effects and Best Cinematographer.

== Awards ==
=== Best Film ===
- Winner: The Host (South Korea)
  - Curse of the Golden Flower (China/Hong Kong)
  - Exiled (Hong Kong)
  - Love and Honor (Japan)
  - Opera Jawa (Indonesia)
  - Still Life (China)
  - Sivaji (India)

=== Best Director ===
- Winner: Jia Zhangke, Still Life (China)
  - Hong Sang-soo, Woman on the Beach (South Korea)
  - Jafar Panahi, Offside (Iran)
  - Johnnie To, Exiled (Hong Kong)
  - Tsai Ming-liang, I Don't Want to Sleep Alone (Taiwan)
  - Apichatpong Weerasethakul, Syndromes and a Century (Thailand)

=== Best Actor ===
- Winner: Song Kang-ho, The Host (South Korea)
  - Chang Chen, The Go Master (China)
  - Rain, I'm a Cyborg, But That's OK (South Korea)
  - Shahrukh Khan, Don (India)
  - Andy Lau, A Battle of Wits (Japan / Hong Kong / China/ South Korea)
  - Ken Watanabe, Memories of Tomorrow (Japan)

=== Best Actress ===
- Winner: Miki Nakatani, Memories of Matsuko (Japan)
  - Gong Li, Curse of the Golden Flower (Hong Kong/China)
  - Kim Hye-soo, Tazza: The High Rollers (South Korea)
  - Im Soo-jung, I'm a Cyborg, But That's OK (South Korea)
  - Rie Miyazawa, Hana (Japan)
  - Zhang Ziyi, The Banquet (Hong Kong/China)

=== Best Screenwriter ===
- Winner: Mani Haghighi, Men at Work (Iran)
  - Hong Sang-soo, Woman on the Beach (South Korea)
  - Tetsuya Oishi and Shusuke Kaneko, Death Note (Japan)
  - Sohn Jae-gon, My Scary Girl (South Korea)
  - Prabda Yoon, Invisible Waves (Thailand)
  - Zhang Cheng, Yue Xiajun, Ning Ha, Crazy Stone (China/Hong Kong)

=== Best Cinematographer ===
- Winner: Kim Hyung-koo, The Host (South Korea)
  - Andrew Lau and Lai Yiu Fai, Confession of Pain (Hong Kong)
  - Liao Pen-jung, I Don't Want to Sleep Alone (Taiwan)
  - Sayombhu Mukdeeprom, Syndromes and a Century (Thailand)
  - Wang Yu, The Go Master (China)

=== Best Production Designer ===
- Winner: Tim Yip, The Banquet (China/Hong Kong)
  - Cho Geun-hyun, Forbidden Quest (South Korea)
  - Towako Kuwajima, Memories of Matsuko (Japan)
  - Patrick Tam and Cyrus Ho, After This Our Exile (Hong Kong)
  - Emi Wada, The Go Master (China)

=== Best Composer ===
- Winner: Rahayu Supanggah, Opera Jawa (Indonesia)
  - Jeong Yong-jin, Woman on the Beach (South Korea)
  - Peter Kam, Isabella (Hong Kong)
  - Lim Giong, Still Life (China)
  - Tamiya Terashima, Tales from Earthsea (Japan)

=== Best Editor ===
- Winner: Lee Chatametikool, Syndromes and a Century (Thailand)
  - Kim Sun-min, The Host (South Korea)
  - Angie Lam, Dog Bite Dog (Japan / Hong Kong)
  - Park Gok-ji and Jeong Jin-hee, A Dirty Carnival (South Korea)
  - Patrick Tam, After This Our Exile (Hong Kong)

=== Best Visual Effects ===
- Winner: The Orphanage, The Host (South Korea)
  - Angela Barson and Chung Chi-hang, Curse of the Golden Flower (Hong Kong/China)
  - DTI (Digital Tetra Inc.), ETRI, The Restless (South Korea)
  - Ohya Tetsuo, Kamiya Makoto, Onoue Katsuro, The Sinking of Japan (Japan)
  - Masahide Yanagawase, Memories of Matsuko (Japan)

=== Special awards ===
- Box Office Star of Asia Award: Andy Lau
- Asian Film Award for Outstanding Contribution to Asian Cinema: Josephine Siao Fong-fong, presented by Luc Besson
- Asian Film Award for Excellence in Scholarship in Asian Cinema: David Bordwell, presented by Johnnie To
