= Egg (2005 film) =

- Film poster
- Directed by: Yukihiko Tsutsumi
- Screenplay by: Yukihiko Tsutsumi
- Produced by: Haruo Umekawa; Mori Shigeaki; Ryuji Ichiyama
- Starring: Jo Hye-yeong; Inuko Inuyama; Jiro Sato
- Cinematography: Satoru Karasawa
- Edited by: Nobuyuki Ito
- Music by: Akira Mitake
- Production company: Amuse Inc.
- Distributed by: Slow Runner
- Release date: March 26, 2005 (Japan)
- Running time: 73 minutes
- Country: Japan
- Languages: Japanese; Korean; Georgian

Egg (Japanese: 蛋), stylized as EGG. (also known as EGG: The Egg in Her Eyes in English), is a 2005 Japanese science fiction psychological thriller horror comedy film written and directed by Yukihiko Tsutsumi. The film stars Jo Hye-yeong as a woman who experiences visions of a giant mysterious egg when she closes her eyes. The film co-stars Inuko Inuyama, Jiro Sato and Megumi Ujiie. Egg was theatrically released by Slow Runner on March 26, 2005, in Japan.

== Premise ==
Arai Tsukiko is a young Korean immigrant working in Japan as a debugger. Ever since she was a child, a strange phenomenon has afflicted Tsukiko. Whenever she closes her eyes, she sees visions of a giant egg. Each time she sees the egg, it gets closer to hatching. One day, a strange creature finally emerges from the egg and begins to harm her. Tsukiko must now battle against the creature in her mind's eye. As each blink creates escalating real-world horrors, she is slowly driven mad, desperately seeking assistance from those around her.

== Cast ==
- Jo Hye-yeong as Arai Tsukiko
- Inuko Inuyama
- Jiro Sato
- Megumi Ujiie
- Samy Pop
- Yasuhisa Konishi

== Production ==
Director Tsutsumi made Egg in 2002, but it was not released until 2005. The film was shot on 35 mm. Former Miss Korea contestant Jo Hye-yeong was cast in the lead role. Daizaburo Harada, known for his work as CGI director of Swallowtail Butterfly, served as the film's VFX supervisor.

Years later, when asked about the origin of the project, Tsutsumi said, "I had been preparing a big film. It was to star Koji Yakusho, an adaptation of Ryū Murakami’s novel Exodus from Hopeless Japan (Kibō no Kuni no Exodus). We were planning to shoot in Thailand, it was quite a big-budget blockbuster film. But, for various reasons, it didn’t work out, and we suddenly found ourselves with a blank schedule for three months. I talked to the producer for that film, asking: if I write the script within one week, can I shoot something else? And that’s how we started working on Egg."

In addition, he said, "I did finish the script in one week, we did pre-production in ten days, and we shot the entire thing in two weeks. Egg is a kaiju film, and it’s quite hard to prepare a kaiju in ten days, but we somehow managed it."

In the same interview, Tsutsumi stated, "[...] I don’t quite understand why [Egg is] popular."

== Themes ==
According to the American Genre Film Archive, "EGG is a searing Y2K-era cocktail of creature features, body horror, psychological thrillers and vaporwave aesthetics. This surreal effort by the highly prolific Yukihiko Tsutsumi deconstructs sensitive themes such as women's traditional roles in society while also fully delivering on the promise of alien creepazoids."

== Release ==
Egg was screened at the 2002 Tokyo International Fantastic Film Festival. After three years with no distribution, it was theatrically released by Slow Runner (a subsidiary of Pony Canyon) on March 26, 2005, in Japan.

The film was released on Region 2 DVD in Japan on August 26, 2005.

Boutique label Error4444 released a region free limited edition Blu-ray of the film on March 4, 2025.

== Reception ==
In 2018, Niina Doherty wrote for Horrornews.net, "It is a bizarre tale and quite unlike anything else out there, but nevertheless a rather enjoyable one. [...] While EGG. has many surprises to offer, none surprised me quite as much as the subtle humour that runs throughout the film. Starting with scenes of Tsukiko’s fellow office workers all moving in unison bringing to mind the weird world of Roy Andersson and the grey, miserable workforce that features is [sic] his comedies, the very unprofessional doctor and off kilter police officers that should all go through some sensitivity training, and later on escalating in to a bizarre Benny Hill like chase scene, the humour is well planned and sets just the right mood for the rest of the film. It can be a hard thing to balance humour within horror, especially if you are not setting out to make a horror comedy, but EGG. succeeds in this task very well. It has just enough humour to keep things light, but not so much that you can’t take the film seriously."

A review for Onderhond.com stated, "EGG is a film for fans of Japanese weirdness, a little mindbender that defies easy description." It also said, "There's some weird lore here that doesn't make too much sense, luckily the film is weird and intriguing enough to transcend its plot [...] EGG is short, quirky and unique, it's a shame Tsutsumi abandoned this type of film."

In a 2023 review, Tomas Dexter wrote, "Tsukiko’s adventure is a long and chaotic assembly of symbolism and metaphors. The mystery behind the violent creature almost becomes secondary while having to take in the racy scenes and ludicrous characters (like Tsukiko’s group of friends). Actress Jo Hye-yeong, a former Miss Korea contestant, is surprisingly good at conveying both panic and physical comedy. Unfortunately, her performance doesn’t save the movie’s climax that drags on way more than necessary, but at least it comes with some gorgeous scenery in the process." He also wrote, "EGG. is not a movie for everyone, but it’s undeniably original as hell."

Blake Simons of easternKicks called Egg, "[...] a remarkable film, and a film with a distinctly arthouse sensibility made just before [Tsutsumi] made a more complete move into blockbuster filmmaking."
