= Coppong Daeng Rannu =

Indonesian dancer (1920–2010

Coppong Daeng Rannu (1920 in Gowa, South Sulawesi – 2 June 2010) is a master of Makassar ethnic-group dances. She is best known as Rice Goddess in performance I La Galigo.

== Life ==
She began learning dance when she was 10 years old, continued her family's dancing-tradition. She was moved to become a dancer by her mother's words, "if you don’t learn to dance, then there are no one in our family who could carry on our dancing-generation." She learned dancing from her grandfather, Mosoa Daeng Olla, who taught her Pakarena and Salonreng. Pakarena is a dance performed in palace by 3 dancers, and salonreng is a ritual dance performed in certain events, such as in warding off misfortune ceremonies. She may be the only one who able to perform the near-extinct Salonreng.

She debuted as palace dancer of Balla Lompoa, Gowa Royal Palace. For a three-month period in 2004, she performed for I La Galigo across Singapore, Europe, US, and Australia.

She died on 2 June 2010 from asthma at 89.

== Awards ==
- In 1999, received award from Indonesian tourism, arts and cultural minister
- In 2000, received award from South Sulawesi Culture Foundation
- In 2004, received award from Robert Wilson (director) in performance of I La Galigo

== Resources ==
- Translated from KOMPAS with some edits, Empu Tari Kuno Makassar - Saturday, April 28, 2007. Retrieved on May 1, 2007.
- https://translate.google.com.au/translate?hl=en&sl=id&u=http://bukan-tokohindonesia.blogspot.com/2009/06/coppong-daeng-rannu-empu-tari-kuno.html&prev=search
- https://www.pressreader.com/indonesia/the-jakarta-post/20100608/282333971148646
- http://gaycitynews.nyc/gcn_430/ponderousmusical.html
- http://www.performanceparadigm.net/index.php/journal/article/viewFile/41/42
- http://ro.uow.edu.au/cgi/viewcontent.cgi?article=1181&context=creartspapers
- https://ich.unesco.org/doc/src/NGO-90223-ICH-09.pdf
