= Opera Jawa =

2007 film

- The Austrian theatrical poster.
- Directed by: Garin Nugroho
- Written by: Armantono; Garin Nugroho
- Produced by: Garin Nugroho; Simon Field; Keith Griffiths
- Starring: Artika Sari Devi; Martinus Miroto; Eko Supriyanto
- Cinematography: Gay Hian Teoh
- Edited by: Andi Pulung Waluyo
- Music by: Rahayu Supanggah
- Distributed by: Trigon Film
- Release date: 7 August 2006 (Indonesia)
- Running time: 120 minutes
- Countries: Indonesia; Austria
- Language: Indonesian

Opera Jawa (Requiem from Java) is a 2006 Indonesian-Austrian musical film directed by Garin Nugroho that features traditional Javanese classical music and dance in a setting of opera that is inspired by the "Abduction of Sita" episode from the Ramayana.

The film was commissioned for Peter Sellars' New Crowned Hope festival in celebration of the 250th anniversary of the birth of Wolfgang Amadeus Mozart.

In addition to music by Rahayu Supanggah, the film features installation art production design by Nanang Rhamat.

== Plot ==
Siti (Artika Sari Devi) and Setio (Martinus Miroto) are a married couple living in a small village. They were once dancers in plays depicting the Ramayana, but have since retired from the stage to sell earthenware pottery.

Siti used to play the part of Sita, the wife of Prince Rama, whom Setio portrayed. In an episode from the Ramayana, Siti becomes the object of desire of evil King Ravana and is abducted by him.

The events of the Ramayana are paralleled in the characters' real lives when Ludiro (Eko Supriyanto), a butcher who rules over all the village's business affairs, tries to seduce Siti.

== Release and reception ==
=== Film festivals ===
Opera Jawa was one of several films commissioned by Peter Sellars for the New Crowned Hope Festival in 2006 in Vienna to celebrate the 250th anniversary of the birth of Wolfgang Amadeus Mozart. Other films commissioned for the project included I Don't Want to Sleep Alone by Tsai Ming-liang and Syndromes and a Century by Apichatpong Weerasethakul.

The film had its world premiere on August 7, 2006, at the Jogja-NETPAC Asian Film Festival. It was then screened at several film festivals, including the Venice Film Festival, the Toronto International Film Festival, the Vancouver International Film Festival and Nantes Festival of Three Continents. In 2007, its festival screenings include the International Film Festival Rotterdam, Belgrade's FEST, the Cleveland International Film Festival, the Singapore International Film Festival, the Cambridge Film Festival and the Era New Horizons Film Festival.

There were theatrical releases in 2007 in the United Kingdom and the Netherlands. It received a limited theatrical release in January 2008 at the Museum of Modern Art in New York City.

The 35 mm screening of Opera Jawa will open the 20th Jogja-NETPAC Asian Film Festival on 29 November 2025.

=== Critical response ===
The film has generated praise from critics, with a rating of 100% (fresh) on Rotten Tomatoes, based on 13 reviews.

=== Awards and nominations ===
Opera Jawa won the Best Composer award for Rahayu Supanggah at the inaugural Asian Film Awards. It was also one of six nominees for Best Film at the 1st Asian Film Awards.

It was nominated for Best Feature Film at the 2007 Asia Pacific Screen Awards.

It won the Silver Screen Award for Best Film at the 2007 Singapore International Film Festival.
