= Yukihiko Tsutsumi =

Japanese television and film director (born 1955)

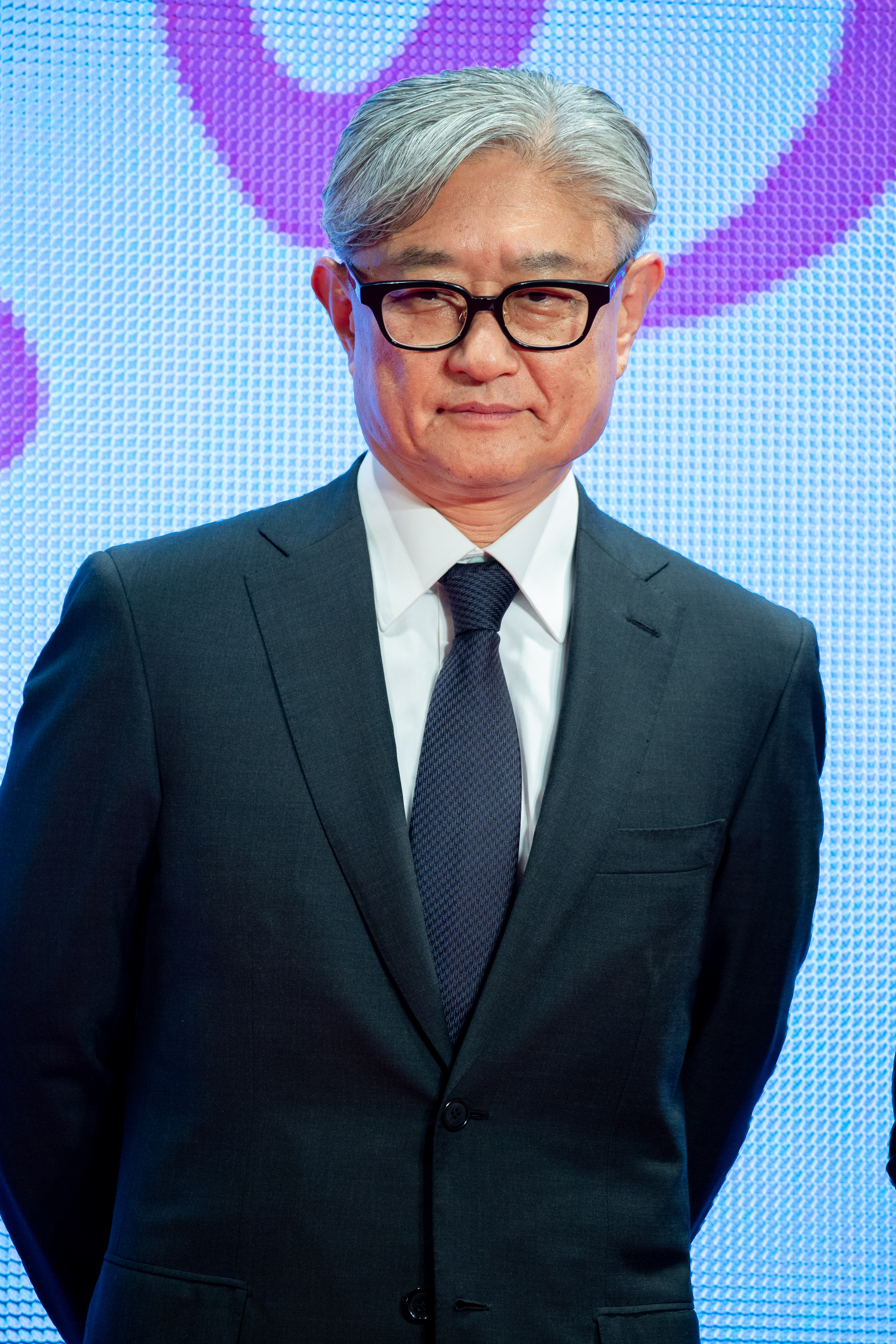
- Tsutsumi at the 31st Tokyo International Film Festival
- Born: November 3, 1955 (age 70); Yokkaichi, Mie, Japan
- Occupations: Television and film director
- Website: www.crescendo.co.jp/creators/tsutsumi.html

Yukihiko Tsutsumi (堤幸彦, Tsutsumi Yukihiko; born November 3, 1955 in Yokkaichi, Mie) is a Japanese television and film director. He began directing commercials and music promotion videos as an employee of Nippon Television. After spending time abroad, he returned and started his own production company, Office Crescendo, from which he works independently. His first television drama on Nippon Television was called Kora! Tonneruzu and ran from 1985 to 1989. He directed Taitei no Ken, an original work by Baku Yumemakura, in 2007.

== Selected films ==
- Shanghai Mermaid Legend Murder Case (1997)
- Shinsei Toilet no Hanako-san (1998)
- Keizoku: Unsolved Mysteries - Beautiful Dreamer (2000)
- Drowning Fish (2001)
- Chinese Dinner (2001)
- Pikanchi Life Is Hard Dakedo Happy (2002)
- Jam Films - Hijiki segment (2002)
- 2LDK (2003)
- Collage of Our Life (2003)
- Pikanchi Life Is Hard Dakara Happy (2004)
- EGG. (2005)
- Forbidden Siren (2006)
- Memories of Tomorrow (2006)
- The Sword of Alexander (2007)
- Happily Ever After (2007)
- Hōtai Club (2007)
- Where the Legend Lives (2008)
- 20th Century Boys (2008 - 2009)
- Beck (2010)
- Eight Ranger (2012)
- SPEC: Ten (2012)
- SPEC: Close (2013)
- Angel Home (2013)
- Trick The Movie: Last Stage (2014)
- Eight Ranger 2 (2014)
- The Mourner (2015)
- Initiation Love (2015)
- The Big Bee (2015)
- Sanada 10 Braves (2016)
- The House Where the Mermaid Sleeps (2018)
- 12 Suicidal Teens (2019)
- Hope (2020)
- First Love (2021)
- Arashi Anniversary Tour 5×20 Film: Record of Memories (2021)
- A Conviction of Marriage (2024)
- The Hotel of My Dream (2024)
- The Killer Goldfish (2024)
- Step Out (2025)
- Mystery Arena (2026)
- Hinata (2026)

== Selected dramas ==
- The Kindaichi Case Files (1995–96)
- Psychometrer Eiji (1997)
- Keizoku (1999)
- Ikebukuro West Gate Park (2000)
- Trick (2000)
- Stand Up!! (2003)
- Socrates in Love (2004)
- H2 (2005)
- Kosetsu Hyaku Monogatari (2006)
- Sushi Ōji! (2007)
- SPEC: Birth (2010)
- Yamegoku: Helpline Cop (2015)

== Ice show ==
- Hyoen – Mirror-Patterned Demon (2025)

== Awards ==
- The 40th Hochi Film Award: Best Director for The Big Bee and Initiation Love
