= Professor Layton and the Last Specter =

Japanese puzzle adventure video game

- North American box art. Characters, from left to right: Luke Triton, Hershel Layton, and Emmy Altava
- Developer: Level-5
- Publishers: JP: Level-5; WW: Nintendo
- Director: Usuke Kumagai
- Producer: Akihiro Hino
- Composer: Tomohito Nishiura
- Series: Professor Layton
- Platform: Nintendo DS
- Release: JP: November 26, 2009; NA: October 17, 2011; EU: November 25, 2011; AU: December 1, 2011
- Genres: Puzzle, Adventure
- Mode: Single-player

Professor Layton and the Last Specter, (Note: Known in Japan as Reiton-kyōju to Majin no Fue (レイトン教授と魔神の笛, lit. Professor Layton and the Specter's Flute)) known in Europe as Professor Layton and the Spectre's Call, is a puzzle adventure video game produced by Level-5 for the Nintendo DS handheld game console. Last Specter is the fourth game in the Professor Layton series, and is a prequel that takes place three years before the first trilogy, detailing how Professor Layton met his apprentice, Luke Triton, as well as introducing Layton's assistant Emmy Altava.

Professor Layton and the Last Specter also includes an additional role-playing game entitled Professor Layton's London Life, available from the start of the game. London Life, in which players interact with various characters from the series in a town called "Little London", was advertised as having over 100 hours of content. London Life was removed from the European versions of the game because the translation of texts would have significantly delayed the game's release.

The game was released during 2009 in Japan, and was the highest-selling game there during the week of its release. It saw release in North American and PAL regions during 2011.

== Gameplay ==
Professor Layton and the Last Specter is a puzzle game presented in the style of an adventure game. The player controls the actions of a group of three protagonists as they move about a village called Misthallery: Professor Hershel Layton, his assistant Emmy Altava, and a young boy named Luke Triton. While in the village, the three of them are presented with several mysteries that are solved as the plot progresses. Misthallery is divided into several sections, although many require the plot to progress to a certain point before they can be accessed. In order to move about Misthallery, players tap a shoe-shaped icon on the bottom-right corner of the touch screen, and then the arrow representing the direction of the path they wish to take. While in Misthallery, the player is capable of tapping anywhere on the bottom screen of the Nintendo DS system to investigate objects and reveal bits of dialogue, hint coins, collectible items, or hidden puzzles. Likewise, if a non-player character is visible on the screen, they can be tapped to initiate a conversation.

=== Puzzles ===
Puzzle interface in Professor Layton and the Last Specter. The puzzle is solved via input from the bottom touch screen, while instructions are provided on the top.

Initiating a conversation or investigating an object in the main game will often lead to the player being asked to solve a puzzle. If the plot progresses to a point at which a puzzle can no longer be accessed, it will be retrieved by a character named Keats the Cat for later solving. There are over 170 puzzles in the game, including brain teasers, sliding puzzles, logic puzzles, peg solitaire, and several other varieties. When a puzzle begins, the player is briefly presented with the puzzle's name, number, and value in "Picarats", the game's system of points as well as an estimation of the puzzle's difficulty. These points are not used during the main game, but if a player collects enough of these Picarats, they gain access to bonuses accessible from the main menu.

After this first screen, players are taken the main puzzle solving interface, which provides instructions for the current puzzle on the top screen while allowing the player to interact directly with the touch screen in order to solve the puzzle. The player has an infinite amount of time to complete each puzzle, and they have access to an in-game memo pad function to aid them in solving each puzzle. If they do not wish to solve the puzzle at the time, they can hit the button labelled "Quit" in order to exit the interface without losing any Picarats. Additionally, all puzzles have three hints available that can be purchased with tokens called "hint coins". If a player needs more help, they can also purchase a fourth "super hint", a more detailed hint that costs two hint coins. However, there are a limited amount of hint coins, and the game recommends they be used wisely. The player starts with ten hint coins, but more can be obtained by thorough investigation of the village.

In order to solve a puzzle, the player must input an answer on the bottom screen. Sometimes, this will involve tapping a button labelled "Input Answer" and writing a word or number that solves the given puzzle. Other times, they might be asked to circle an answer or tap an area on the touch screen, and then hit "Submit". Still others are solved automatically once the player finds the solution by interacting with objects on the bottom screen. If the player has made a mistake in solving a puzzle, they can hit the button labelled "Restart" to reset the puzzle. Deducted Picarats and purchased hints are not reset if a puzzle is restarted. If the player submits an incorrect answer, they will be asked to repeat the puzzle, and a varying amount of Picarats will be deducted from the maximum possible for that puzzle. If the player submits a correct answer, they are rewarded with the amount of Picarats the puzzle is worth, and the plot will progress. After completing a puzzle, it can be played again at any time from the Puzzle Index, a section in the game's interface that lists the puzzles a player has completed. Occasionally, after completing a puzzle, the player will receive small items that can be used in minigames. Fulfilling certain criteria, such as clearing all levels in a minigame, unlock additional puzzles in the Bonuses section.

Players are also capable of connecting to Nintendo Wi-Fi Connection in order to download additional puzzles in the "Bonuses" mode, which can be selected from the game's title screen. These puzzles to be are made available each week following the game's release. Hints for these puzzles could not be purchased with hint coins, but they were provided freely one week after the puzzle was made available, for 33 weeks. When a player connected to Nintendo Wi-Fi Connection, all puzzles and hints would be downloaded. After May 20, 2014, it's no longer possible to download the additional content, as the Nintendo Wi-Fi Connection service was terminated on that date.

=== Minigames ===
Professor Layton and the Last Specter also features several small minigames that are playable in the main game, available by selecting them from the Professor's Suitcase located in the top-right corner of the bottom screen while moving about the town. In order to play these minigames, the plot must have progressed far enough to have unlocked each of them, and more difficult levels require the completion of puzzles in the main game.

The Toy Train minigame involves laying a railroad track across a complex game board. The toy train must pass through every train station and reach a defined end point, and in harder levels, it must be timed to avoid cars and other trains. The toy train requires fuel to move, limiting the amount of track that can be placed by a player unless more fuel is collected before a track ends.

The Fish minigame involves manipulating a fish to collect every coin in its tank. The fish moves in a straight diagonal line, and the player can alter this line by placing bubbles at certain marked points, reflecting it in a different direction. In the Japanese version of Last Specter, the Fish minigame is instead based on trying to create words by feeding them to fish, who alter them in specific patterns.

In the Puppet Theater minigame, the player is tasked with finishing the script of an ongoing play so that it makes sense. If the player chooses a word that does not make sense in the context of the play, the play abruptly ends and the player is asked to try again; if all of the right words are chosen, the play is given an epilogue and an audience applauds.

After progressing far enough into the story, the player can tap mice across Misthallery to earn "mouse badges" and gain access to another minigame, entitled Mouse Alley. Unlike the other minigames, this is accessed through a character in Misthallery and not through the Trunk. The goal of the minigame is to tap as many mice as possible within the time limit, while avoiding tapping Luke's mouse, Toppy, by mistake. This is the only real-time element in the game.

== Plot ==
=== Setting ===
Professor Layton and the Last Specter takes place three years before the events of Professor Layton and the Curious Village in a fictional English village known as Misthallery. In Misthallery, citizens have long spoken of legends of a specter who rose from the mist to defend the village whenever the Specter's Flute was played. Lately, a monster who is believed by the town's population to be this specter has been attacking the village during the middle of the night, destroying homes and buildings.

Misthallery is a watery town in which traveling via gondola to move about the town's canals is commonplace. By these canals, the town is divided into five distinct regions: the Crossroads, the Market, the East District, Ely Street, and Highyard Hill. The Crossroads contain the library as well as the home of the mayor, Clark Triton. The town market is a shady place controlled by a mysterious entity known as the Black Raven, the East District contains an abandoned warehouse, and Ely Street as well as Highyard Hill are primarily residential areas. On the outskirts of Highyard Hill lies the manor owned by the former mayor's children, who live away from the rest of the village. The townspeople believe that the manor is home to a witch. The town is also rumored to contain the Golden Garden, hidden ruins of an ancient city.

=== Story ===
A still from one of the animated cutscenes within Professor Layton and the Last Specter

As the story begins, a woman named Emmy Altava is hired to be Professor Layton's assistant at the fictional Gressenheller University. Upon her introduction to him, he reveals that he is currently heading towards a town named Misthallery. According to a letter allegedly sent by his close friend, Clark Triton, a Specter is attacking the village at night. As the pair reach Clark's house, though, they find that the letter was sent not by Clark, but by his son, Luke, who has learned how to predict the Specter's attacks and wished to enlist Layton's help in putting an end to them. Luke sneaks out of his house to join Layton and Emmy's investigation. After they finish exploring Misthallery for the day, they go to spend the night at a local hotel. As they look out from the window in their room, they hear the sound of a flute and see a large, shadowy figure emerge from the mist, which proceeds to forge a path of destruction through the town, including their hotel room, before vanishing without a trace.

The next day, Layton, Luke, and Emmy set off to find the town's black market in order to discover information about the Specter's Flute, an artifact which is said to grant those who play it control over the Specter. After winning the trust of the Black Raven, a group of children who run the market, Layton learns that the flute was auctioned to the now-deceased Evan Barde, once the richest man in Misthallery, soon before the Specter started attacking the town. The three then head to Barde Manor to visit his daughter, Arianna, a girl who was once close friends with Luke, but is now suffering from a terminal illness and is believed by the townspeople to be a witch.

Arianna refuses to talk to anyone, however, so Layton and Luke continue to question the townspeople while Emmy goes to the Scotland Yard for information regarding Evan Barde's death. With the aid of Inspectors Chelmey and Grosky, she uncovers the records for the case before heading back to Misthallery to reunite with Layton and Luke. Inspector Grosky returns with her, hoping that his own influence will help convince the town's Chief of Police, Chief Jakes, to provide further information on the case. Regardless, Chief Jakes remains adamantly opposed to the investigation of Barde's death, and demands that Layton and company leave the town within 24 hours. Despite Jakes' threats, they visit Arianna to explain to her what has happened to the town and to her father. Arianna opens up to them, and proceeds to guide them to the nearby lake before playing the Specter's Flute, which causes a prehistoric aquatic creature named Loosha to rise from the lake.

Chief Jakes then appears at the lake, revealing that he had followed the Professor, and takes Arianna and Loosha into police custody, claiming them to be behind the Specter attacks. In his absence, the trio manage to find the real "Specter" at an abandoned factory within the town. As Arianna and Loosha are being formally accused in front of the townspeople, Layton appears and exposes the true identity of the Specter: an excavation machine destroying the town in search of the "Golden Garden", ancient ruins believed to be beneath Misthallery. He goes on to describe Chief Jakes' scheme to become mayor of the town and his accomplice: a man disguised as Clark's butler, Doland Noble, named Jean Descole, a scientist looking for the Golden Garden who had held hostage Clark's wife along with his real butler. With Descole's plan revealed, he combines his machines into a giant mecha in a final attempt to level the town in search of the Golden Garden.

With the combined efforts of Layton, Luke, Emmy, Loosha, and the Black Ravens, the mecha is eventually defeated and Descole is forced to retreat. Despite Loosha having been fatally wounded during the fight, she proceeds to destroy the floodgates of the town's dam, drying the lake and revealing the entrance to the Golden Garden. As the group enter the garden, Loosha dies, and Arianna learns of Loosha's true intentions. Loosha knew that the clean environment of the garden would help Arianna recover from her disease, and fought the Specter to ensure the garden would survive long enough to cure her. She fully recovers from her illness a year later, and the Golden Garden's discovery is then made public, marking the beginning of Layton's fame in the field of archaeology.

As Luke leaves the garden, he realizes he still has much to learn about the world, and asks to become Layton's apprentice. Layton obliges, and the game ends with Luke bidding farewell to the people of Misthallery before beginning his journeys with Layton. In a final scene, Jean Descole is seen on a cart, preparing his next plan.

== Professor Layton's London Life ==
Gameplay from London Life. Players perform errands for various characters from the Professor Layton series.

Professor Layton's London Life (レイトン教授のロンドンライフ, Layton-kyōju no Rondon Raifu) is a role-playing game developed in cooperation with Brownie Brown, included with Professor Layton and the Last Specter. In London Life, the player creates an avatar that can later be customized with clothing and accessories. With this avatar, players live in "Little London", a small city inspired by London. Within Little London, the player can create and decorate their own room and perform errands for the townspeople, who consist of many characters from all four games in the Professor Layton series at the time of its creation. The game also includes characters from the animated movie released later the same year, Professor Layton and the Eternal Diva, such as singer Janice Quatlane as well as Melina and Oswald Whistler. By aiding the townspeople, players can gain items or furniture that can be used to access new areas of the city, as well as wealth and happiness. Players can also use Nintendo Wi-Fi Connection to upload their avatar to the Internet, to be downloaded by other players with whom they have traded friend codes. London Life is advertised to contain over 100 hours worth of gameplay. Players can also trade in-game items with others through the Nintendo DS's tag mode feature, in which the Nintendo DS system communicates wirelessly with other Nintendo DS systems running the same game while in sleep mode.

Professor Layton's London Life would later be the basis of another Level-5 title, Fantasy Life. London Life can only be played after completing the Japanese version of the main game Last Specter, but is accessible from the beginning of the game in North American and Australian versions of the game. The European versions do not include London Life, because the amount of time it would take to translate the game would otherwise have prevented the game from being released before the end of 2011.

== Development and release ==
=== Development ===
Every puzzle in Last Specter was created by Akira Tago, a Japanese professor and author of the Atama no Taisō series of puzzle books, which has sold more than 12 million copies within Japan. The game was produced by Level-5 CEO Akihiro Hino, and designed around the concept of "Nazotoki × Deai no Monogatari" (「ナゾトキ×出会いの物語」; Lit. "Puzzle-solving and the Story of the Encounter"), detailing how Professor Layton met his apprentice, Luke.

The Professor Layton series was envisioned as a trilogy, to be completed with the release of the third game, Professor Layton and the Unwound Future. In spite of this, Hino said that, during the development of Unwound Future, Level-5 had received a lot of questions from gamers asking if it was "really the end [of the series]", which was all of the inspiration he needed to create a "second season" of the Professor Layton series. In March 2009, Akihiro Hino officially unveiled Professor Layton and the Last Specter in Famitsu, stating that, with the second season, each game would take longer to develop than before, to dispel beliefs that Professor Layton had not significantly changed with each passing game. The second season of the series was also scheduled to have animated movies that take place between the games, starting with Professor Layton and the Eternal Diva, which was announced alongside Last Specter.

=== Soundtrack ===
"The Last Specter's Theme"
Sample of "The Last Specter's Theme", displaying the game's musical style.

In Japan, the music featured within the game was released as a soundtrack: the Layton-kyōju to Majin no Fue Original Soundtrack (レイトン教授と魔神の笛 オリジナル・サウンドトラック, Professor Layton and the Specter's Flute Original Soundtrack). The ending theme, "Paxmáveiti" (Paxmáveiti ラフマベティ -君が僕にくれたもの-, Paxmáveiti Lafumabety -Kimiga Bokuni Kuretamono-), sung by Yūko Andō, was omitted from the soundtrack, and was also replaced with an instrumental version of the song in international releases of the game. The game also reuses music from Diabolical Box and Unwound Future.

The game's musical score has been met very positively. Square Enix Music Online rated the soundtrack an eight out of ten, stating that it "goes a little step further compared to its ancestors", and praised the quality of the orchestral renditions, calling them "superior to Professor Layton and the [Unwound Future], which already had fantastic arrangements." RPGfan likewise praised the orchestral songs, and also spoke highly of the rest of the soundtrack, particularly "The Last Specter's Theme", stating that it was "sure to win over most any video game music fan."

Professor Layton and the Last Specter Original Soundtrack
No.	Title	English Localization	Length
1.	"魔神の笛の旋律"	The Specter's Melody	0:22
2.	"魔神の笛のテーマ"	The Last Specter's Theme	3:50
3.	"魔神出現"	The Specter Appears	1:01
4.	"水の町~ミストハレリ昼"	Misthallery's Many Canals	3:26
5.	"謎5"	More Puzzles	2:28
6.	"不思議な話"	A Strange Story	2:22
7.	"風の町~ハイヤードヒル"	The Wind on Highyard Hill	2:33
8.	"影のある邸宅"	The Darkened Manor	2:34
9.	"穏やかな午後"	A Quiet Afternoon	1:42
10.	"ランブル!"	Rumble!	1:52
11.	"謎6~推理"	Puzzle Deductions	2:33
12.	"闇市場"	The Black Market	2:00
13.	"静かな時間"	A Quiet Moment	1:19
14.	"霧の町~ミストハレリ夜"	Foggy Misthallery	3:29
15.	"教授のカバン~ミラクルフィッシュ"	The Fish	2:20
16.	"教授のカバン~人形劇"	The Puppets	2:13
17.	"教授のカバン~ミニチュアトレイン"	The Toy Train	1:51
18.	"ゴーストファクトリー"	The Abandoned Factory	2:09
19.	"デスコールのテーマ"	Descole's Theme	2:44
20.	"ラストバトルのテーマ"	The Final Battle	4:03
21.	"伝説の楽園"	The Golden Garden	4:09
22.	"楽園の守り神~ラグーシのテーマ"	Loosha's Theme	2:55
23.	"謎5 <生演奏ヴァージョン>"	More Puzzles (Live Version)	4:18
24.	"ラストバトルのテーマ <生演奏ヴァージョン>"	The Final Battle (Live Version)	3:32
25.	"デスコールのテーマ <生演奏ヴァージョン>"	Descole's Theme (Live Version)	2:43
Total length:			64:28

=== Release ===
Though the game was released within Japan during November 2009, the game did not appear at E3 2010 alongside Unwound Future and the Nintendo 3DS sequel to Last Specter, Professor Layton and the Miracle Mask, which were both announced at the event. The game would, for the next year, only be mentioned by Nintendo in passing during an interview involving the Nintendo DSi XL, where it was referred to as Professor Layton and the Specter's Flute. At the end of May 2011, Level-5 filed a trademark in the United States for Professor Layton and the Last Specter, and the game was officially unveiled internationally following E3 2011. The game was released in North American and PAL regions during late 2011.

After the game's release in Japan during late 2009, Professor Layton and the Last Specter quickly rose to the top of Japanese sales charts, moving over 300,000 units during its first week, eventually totaling 659,504 sales in Japan as of December 20, 2010. When it saw international release during late 2011, it became the best-selling Nintendo DS game in North America on the week of its release – although across all platforms, it was outsold by Batman: Arkham City and Just Dance 3, among other titles. In the United Kingdom, it was the seventh-highest selling game on its week of release, and the third-highest on a single console following both the Xbox 360 and PlayStation 3 versions of Call of Duty: Modern Warfare 3. By the end of 2011, the game totaled 1.19 million sales within North America and Europe, where it has sold 1.25 million copies as of March 2012.

== Reception ==
Reception

Aggregate score
Aggregator	Score
Metacritic	83/100

Review scores
Publication	Score
1Up.com	A−
Adventure Gamers	4/5
Destructoid	7/10
Eurogamer	8/10
Famitsu	34/40
Game Informer	8.5/10
GamePro	4.5/5
GameRevolution	B+
GameSpot	8/10
GamesRadar+	4/5
GameTrailers	8.6/10
IGN	9/10
Joystiq	4/5
Nintendo Life	9/10
Nintendo Power	8.5/10
Nintendo World Report	9/10
Official Nintendo Magazine	90%
VideoGamer.com	7/10
The Daily Telegraph	2.5/5
The Escapist	4.5/5

Awards
Publication	Award
RPGFan	Best Graphic Adventure
IGN	Best Puzzle Game (People's Choice)
IGN	Best 3DS/DS Story

Professor Layton and the Last Specter received "favorable" reviews according to video game review aggregator Metacritic. Many critics noted that although the game feels similar to past titles, the series had found a working formula and did not need to change. IGN shared these sentiments, but found that the game had "an added attention to detail that makes the whole game feel a bit sharper and more magnificent" than its predecessors. The game's puzzles received mixed reception. Reviewers often commented that they felt too similar to puzzles from the other games in the series, and several felt that they tended to be vague or inconsistent in difficulty. Despite this, GamePro felt that the game's puzzles were "more balanced" than those from previous games. The game's cutscenes and visuals were very well received, with GamesRadar describing the cutscenes as "near-Ghibli quality" and IGN said that "the graphics, which make use of a cartoony yet beautifully detailed, painterly art style, are simply gorgeous."

Professor Layton's London Life was also viewed as a worthwhile extension to the game, with 1UP.com stating that the main game was "almost a side diversion" in comparison. Critics often compared the gameplay to the popular Animal Crossing franchise. Response to the game was mixed. IGN felt it "surprising the game was included as a mere bonus" and GamePro praised the dialogue, calling it "clever and genuinely funny in ways that few other games are." However, Game Revolution said that the game soon "becomes a chore" to play, and some reviewers were unhappy with the decision to remove the game from European versions of Professor Layton and the Last Specter. Neon Kelly of VideoGamer.com stated: "This will please the Professor's long-term supporters, but it's clear that the next instalment needs to bring in a fresh idea or two. Simply being Laytonesque won't cut it anymore."

The Escapist gave Last Specter a score of four-and-a-half stars out of five, saying, "Another Professor Layton game, another bit of puzzling brilliance. Some of the brain teasers feel a bit recycled - instead of foxes and chickens, you're shuttling dogs and cats across the river, for example - but there's more than enough variety to warrant doggedly tracking down every last one. But if you only solve the ones you need to move the story forward, that's ok, too." Philip Reed of Nintendo Life gave the game a nine out of ten, stating: "It challenges your mind in a way very few games seriously attempt to do, and the feeling you get when you solve a particularly difficult puzzle is less one of relief than it is a desire to leap ahead in the game and find the next one. Playing this game is its own reward, and we'd have it no other way." The Guardian gave it four stars out of five, saying, "If you've not been a fan of the series, this isn't the game that's going to change your mind. For everybody else though, Professor Layton & The Spectre's Call is several days of commute-improving, grey cell stimulation in a mostly effective package. And bravo to Nintendo for keeping this franchise on the standard DS rather than – for the time being, at least – adding that third dimension." However, The Daily Telegraph gave it two-and-a-half stars out of five, saying, "The Layton charm is undoubtedly still present, but it's not enough to carry the series by itself. Upon solving certain puzzles, Layton exclaims 'I love the thrill of a good solution'. So do we, Hershel, so do we. And in this Layton game, sadly, that thrill is all too rare."

During the 15th Annual Interactive Achievement Awards, the Academy of Interactive Arts & Sciences nominated Professor Layton and the Last Specter for "Handheld Game of the Year".

== See also ==
- List of Professor Layton media
