= Miki Nakatani =

Japanese actress and singer (born 1976)

- 中谷 美紀
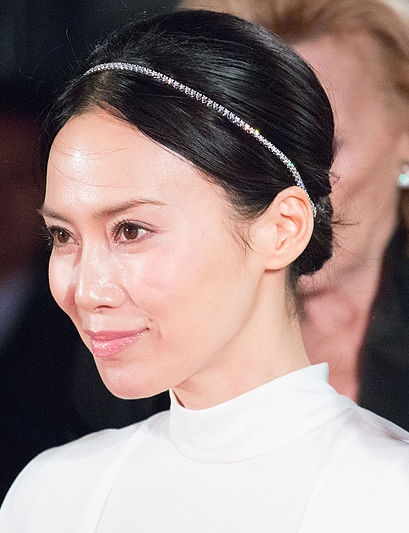
- Nakatani in 2015 at the 28th Tokyo International Film Festival
- Born: 12 January 1976 (age 50); Higashimurayama, Tokyo, Japan
- Occupations: Actress, singer
- Years active: 1991–present
- Spouse: Thilo Fechner (m. 2018)

Japanese name
- Kanji: 中谷 美紀
- Hiragana: なかたに みき
- Katakana: ナカタニ ミキ
Transcriptions
- Romanization: Nakatani Miki

Miki Nakatani (中谷 美紀, Nakatani Miki; born 12 January 1976) is a Japanese actress and singer who began her professional career as a member of the girl group Sakurakko Club. Nakatani focused on acting after her departure from the band, making her debut on the popular television drama Under the Same Roof.

She relaunched her music career under the tutelage of producer Ryuichi Sakamoto in 1996, releasing three albums: Shokumotsu Rensa (1996), Cure (1997) and Shiseikatsu (1999). Her best-known songs include "Mind Circus" and "Suna no Kajitsu", which peaked at number ten on the Oricon charts.

As an actress, Nakatani has received six Japan Academy Awards for her roles in When the Last Sword Is Drawn (2002), Memories of Matsuko (2006), and Zero Focus (2009), among others. She is most known internationally for her role as Mai Takano in the Japanese horror film franchise Ring. Nakatani played Jun Shibata on the television drama Keizoku, which spawned a special and a film.

== Biography ==
From 1998 to 1999, Nakatani starred in a trio of horror films – Ring, Rasen, and Ring 2 – followed by a lead role in Hideo Nakata's Chaos in 2000. That same year, she reprised her television role as Jun Shibata in the mystery film Keizoku.

In 2005, she co-starred in Kiyoshi Kurosawa's horror film Loft with Etsushi Toyokawa, and portrayed the love interest Hermes in Densha Otoko.

For her performance in the title role of Matsuko Kawajiri in Tetsuya Nakashima's 2006 film Memories of Matsuko, she won the Best Actress award at the 31st Hochi Film Award, the Asian Film Award for Best Actress, and the Japan Academy Prize for Outstanding Performance by an Actress in a Leading Role.

Nakatani appeared in François Girard's Silk. She co-starred in Isshin Inudo's Zero Focus with Ryōko Hirosue and Tae Kimura.

As a singer, she collaborated several times with Ryuichi Sakamoto from 1996 to 2001.

As a spokesperson and model, she has appeared in several promotion campaigns, including over 70 television commercials for Ito En's Oi Ocha green tea. Nakatani speaks Japanese, French, and English.

In 2018, Nakatani announced her marriage to German musician Thilo Fechner, a viola player with the Vienna Philharmonic.

== Filmography ==
=== Film ===
- Berlin (1995) – Kyoko
- Daishitsuren (1995)
- Ring (1998) – Mai Takano
- Spiral (1998) – Mai Takano
- Ring 2 (1999) – Mai Takano
- Chaos (2000) – Satomi Tsushima
- Keizoku (2000) – Jun Shibata
- When the Last Sword Is Drawn (2003) – Nui
- River of First Love (2004) – Satuki Kato
- The Hotel Venus (2004) – Wife
- Rikidozan (2004) – Aya
- Strings (2004) – Zita
- Thirty Lies or So (2004) – Takarada
- Train Man (2005) – Hermes
- Loft (2005) – Reiko Hatuna
- Dead Run (2005) – Akane
- Memories of Matsuko (2006) – Matsuko Kawajiri
- Christmas on 24 July Avenue (2006) – Sayuri Honda
- Silk (2007) – Madame Blanche
- Happy Ever After (2007) – Yukie Morita
- Flavor of Happiness (2008) – Takako Yamashita
- Zero Focus (2009) – Sachiko
- Sweet Little Lies (2010)
- Hankyu Railways: A 15-Minute Miracle (2011) – Shoko
- Genji Monogatari: Sennen no Nazo (2011) – Shikibu Murasaki
- Himawari & Puppy's Seven Days (2013)
- Real (2013) – Eiko Aihara
- The Kiyosu Conference (2013) – Nene
- Ask This of Rikyu (2013) – Souon
- The World of Kanako (2014) – Rie Azuma
- A Stitch of Life (2015)
- First Gentleman (2021) – prime minister Rinko Sōma
- The Legend and Butterfly (2023) – Kagamino

=== Television ===
- Under the Same Roof (1993) – Aiko Mifune
- Oda Nobunaga (1998) – No-Hime
- Woman Doctor (1999)
- Unsolved Cases (1999) – Jun Shibata
- Eien no Ko (2000) – Yuki Kusaka
- Manatsu no Merry Christmas (2000) – Haru Hoshino
- Prince Shotoku (2001) – Tojiko no Iratsume
- R-17 (2001)
- Otosan (2002)
- Believe (2002)
- Jin (2009) – Miki Tomonaga/Nokaze
- Beautiful Rain (2012) – Akane Nishiwaki
- Gunshi Kanbei (2014) – Teru
- Ghostwriter (2015) – Risa Tono
- IQ246 (2016) – Tomomi Morimoto
- Kataomoi (2017)
- Followers (2020) – Limi Nara
- Giver Taker (2023) - Itsuki Kurasawa
- One Day: Wonderful Christmas Ado (2023) - Kikyo Kurauchi

== Discography ==
=== Albums ===
==== Studio albums ====
All produced by Ryuichi Sakamoto

Title	Album details	Peak chart positions
Title	Album details	JPN Oricon
Shokumotsu Rensa (食物連鎖)	Released: 4 April 1996; Label: For Life; Formats: CD, digital download, streaming	5
Cure	Released: 4 April 1997; Label: For Life; Formats: CD, digital download, streaming	7
Shiseikatsu (私生活)	Released: 10 November 1999; Label: Warner Music Japan; Formats: CD	11

==== Remix albums ====
Title	Album details	Peak chart positions
Title	Album details	JPN Oricon
Vague	Released: 4 April 1997; Label: For Life; Formats: CD	-

==== Compilation albums ====
Title	Album details	Peak chart positions
Title	Album details	JPN Oricon
Absolute Value	Released: 21 August 1998; Label: For Life; Formats: CD	18
Pure Best	Released: 27 August 2001; Label: For Life; Formats: CD	-
Miki	Released: 12 November 2001; Label: Warner Music Japan; Formats: CD	50

=== Singles ===
Single	Year	Label	Chart
"Anata ga Wakaranai" (あなたがわからない)	1993	BMG Rooms	-
"Mind Circus"	1996	For Life	20
"Strange Paradise"	1996	For Life	30
"Suna no Kajitsu" (砂の果実)	1997	For Life	10
"Tengoku yori Yaban-Wilder Than Heaven" (天国より野蛮)	1997	For Life	28
"Ibara no Kanmuri" (いばらの冠)	1997	For Life	36
"Chronic Love" (クロニック・ラヴ)	1999	Warner Music Japan	14
"Frontier" (フロンティア)	1999	Warner Music Japan	18
"Kowareta Kokoro" (こわれたこころ)	2000	Warner Music Japan	22
"Air Pocket" (エアーポケット)	2001	Warner Music Japan	26

== Videography ==
=== Live albums ===
No.	Release	Title	Formats
1st	21 May 1997	Butterfish	DVD, VHS

=== Video-clip albums ===
No.	Release	Title	Formats
1st	21 August 1998	Completeness	DVD, VHS
2nd	25 October 2000	Kowareta Kokoro	VHS
3rd	27 February 2002	Air Pocket	VHS

Awards and achievements
Preceded by None	Asian Film Award for Best Actress; 2007 for Memories of Matsuko	Succeeded by Jeon Do-yeon for Secret Sunshine
