= Jigyaku no Uta =

Japanese manga series

自虐の詩
- Manga
- Written by: Yoshiie Gouda
- Published by: Kobunsha; Takeshobo
- Magazine: Weekly Hōseki
- Original run: 1985 – 1990
- Volumes: 5
- Live-action film

Happily Ever After
- Directed by: Yukihiko Tsutsumi
- Released: October 27, 2007

Jigyaku no Uta (Japanese: 自虐の詩; lit. "Self-Torture Song") is a Japanese manga series by Yoshiie Gouda. The series was adapted by Yukihiko Tsutsumi into a film, known in Japan under the same title and in the United States as Happily Ever After. Viz Pictures licensed the film for release in the United States.

The series follows husband and wife Isao Hayama (葉山 イサオ, Hayama Isao) and Yukie Morita (森田 幸江, Morita Yukie). Yukie works at a noodle shop for long hours while Isao is a lazy gangster. Yukie's friends ask her to leave her husband, but Yukie feels an obligation to him because Isao had initially saved her from misery.

The film aired in a selection of theaters in the United States.

== Principal cast ==
- Miki Nakatani as Yukie
- Hiroshi Abe as Isao
- Toshiyuki Nishida as Yukie's father
