= 2LDK =

- Japanese theatrical release poster
- Directed by: Yukihiko Tsutsumi
- Written by: Yuiko Miura; Yukihiko Tsutsumi; Eiichiro Oda
- Produced by: Shinya Kawai
- Starring: Maho Nonami; Eiko Koike
- Cinematography: Satoru Karasawa
- Edited by: Nobuyuki Ito
- Music by: Akira Mitake
- Distributed by: TLA Releasing
- Release dates: April 11, 2003 (Philadelphia International Film Festival); May 13, 2004 (Japan)
- Running time: 70 minutes
- Country: Japan
- Language: Japanese

2LDK is a 2003 Japanese film, directed by Yukihiko Tsutsumi as part of the Duel Project, starring Maho Nonami and Eiko Koike.

Two ambitious actresses, who share an apartment, learn they have been short-listed for the same part and that they have to wait for one more night to see who wins the part. As they bicker throughout the night, their competitiveness and hidden grudges turn their apartment into a battlefield.

== Synopsis ==
Although aspiring actresses Nozomi (Koike) and Lana (Nonami) share a Tokyo apartment that's owned by their talent management agency, they're a world apart. Nozomi is a soft-spoken country girl from Sado Island who prides herself on being demure. City girl Lana, who grew up in a rough area of Tokyo, is more worldly, experienced and jaded.

Whilst in apartment, they learn they have auditioned for the same part in a highly anticipated film called Yakuza Wives and that there will be a phone call in the morning that will reveal who wins the role. They decide to stay in for the phone call.

A conversation between two actresses turns sour, bringing their hidden resentment to the surface, which pushes them into committing a series of violent acts against each other while arguing over their backgrounds, lifestyles, choices, and love lives.

As they lay dying from severe injuries they inflicted on each other, their apartment phone finally rings at dawn. When it goes unanswered, it's switched to their answering machine. A male voice on the machine announces they both won the part.

== Production ==
2LDK was paired with Ryuhei Kitamura's film Aragami as the Duel Project. Producer Shinya Kawai issued a challenge to directors Tsutsumi and Kitamura to create a feature-length movie each consisting a duel, two actors and one setting, along with a rule that the filming should take just one week.

Tsutsumi's 2LDK was filmed in eight days, with the cast and crew often working throughout the night.

The title is a Japanese real estate acronym for a 2-bedroom apartment with a Living-room, Dining-room, and Kitchen.

== Releases ==
2LDK was released in DVD form in Japan, U.S. and Korean versions. It was also included in the 3-disc box set "Danger after Dark" (which includes Suicide Club and Moon Child as well). 2LDK, part of the Duel Project, was broadcast together with Aragami in Australia through Foxtel Television in 2005.

== Remake ==
In 2012, The Wright Girls, a remake with Gemma Arterton, directed by Andy Fickman, and written by Bert Royal, was announced. By 2014 Fickman was replaced by Kevin Connolly, and Arterton by Jessica Alba.

== See also ==
- Aragami – Ryuhei Kitamura's Duel Project film.
