= Professor Layton and the Eternal Diva =

2009 Japanese anime by Masakazu Hashimoto

- Singaporean release poster
- Directed by: Masakazu Hashimoto
- Screenplay by: Aya Matsui
- Story by: Akihiro Hino
- Produced by: Shūji Abe; Kenji Horikawa; Arimasa Okada; Toshiaki Okuno; Shin Omura; Ichiro Takase
- Starring: Yo Oizumi; Maki Horikita; Nana Mizuki; Atsurō Watabe; Saki Aibu
- Music by: Tomohito Nishiura; Tsuneyoshi Saito
- Production companies: P.A. Works; OLM
- Distributed by: Toho
- Release date: December 19, 2009
- Running time: 100 minutes
- Country: Japan
- Language: Japanese
- Box office: $7.6 million

Professor Layton and the Eternal Diva (レイトン教授と永遠の歌姫, Reiton-kyōju to Eien no Utahime) (Note: Also known as Professor Layton: The First Movie (レイトン教授 ザ・ファースト・ムービー, Reiton-kyōju Za Fāsuto Mūbii).) is a 2009 Japanese animated mystery film directed by Masakazu Hashimoto, written by Aya Matsui from a story by Akihiro Hino and produced by P.A. Works and OLM. The film is based on the Professor Layton video game series by Level-5, taking place between the events of the video games Professor Layton and the Last Specter and Professor Layton and the Miracle Mask. In the story, renowned opera star Janice Quatlane contacts her former teacher, Professor Hershel Layton, after encountering a young girl who claims to be the reincarnation of her dead friend. While Layton and his apprentice, Luke Triton, are attending one of Janice's performances, they get unwillingly pulled into a puzzle-themed battle royal where the winner will apparently receive "the gift of eternal life". According to Level-5, the film stays true to the games, with music, puzzles and characters.

An English-language version was released by Manga Entertainment in the United Kingdom on October 18, 2010, around the same time as Professor Layton and the Unwound Future was released, with a British voice cast (including Maria Darling reprising her role of Luke from the UK releases of the games). The film was released in the United States on November 8, 2011, by Viz Media and received generally positive reviews from critics.

== Plot ==
After solving a mystery at the Big Ben, archaeologist and puzzle master Professor Hershel Layton and his young apprentice Luke Triton reminisce over one of their adventures from three years prior, which takes place after the events of Professor Layton and the Last Specter. Layton and Luke are invited by Layton's former student Janice Quatlane to watch her perform in an opera at the Crown Petone opera house, which is built on the White Cliffs of Dover. The performance centers on the legendary lost Kingdom of Ambrosia and the secret of eternal life it holds. Janice believes recent strange occurrences are somehow connected to the opera: girls have disappeared from London, and the opera's composer, Oswald Whistler, has recently adopted a young girl who has claimed to be his deceased daughter, Melina. Whistler plays the entire opera on the Detragan, an elaborate one-man orchestra machine. Once the performance is complete, a mystery man informs the audience that they are to play a game, the winner of which will receive the secret of eternal life. Several members of the audience try to escape, but the floor opens up beneath them and they disappear. Inspector Grosky tries to arrest the mystery man, but the man is a puppet which inflates and floats out of the theater, taking Grosky with him.

The Crown Petone is revealed to be a ship, which breaks off from the cliffs and sets sail. The mystery man unveils a series of timed puzzles intended to progressively eliminate the players until one winner remains. After solving the first two puzzles, Layton, Luke, Janice, and a group of nine others, including Whistler and his invited guest, child prodigy Amelia Ruth, leave the ship in lifeboats, which take them to their next destination as the ship explodes behind them. The following morning, the group finds themselves on an island, which amateur historian Marco Brock reasons is Ambrosia. The group is chased by a pack of wolves to the center of the island, which houses a castle. Whistler and a few others are eliminated from the game and Layton, Luke, and Janice are separated from the rest of the group, but they eventually arrive at the castle after assembling a makeshift helicopter.

Luke solves the final puzzle that directs him, Janice, Brock, and Amelia to the final room of the contest. Layton separates with the group to explore the rest of the castle, eventually finding a room filled with Melina's belongings, along with a piece of sheet music titled "A Song of the Sea". He meets Melina herself and witnesses her having an argument with herself. Meanwhile, upon entering the final room, the contestants are trapped behind bars. The mystery man reveals himself as Jean Descole, Layton and Luke's old nemesis, who orders Amelia to be brought to him. Luke, Janice and Brock are taken by Descole's men, but they are saved by Layton's assistant, Emmy Altava, who was investigating the disappearances and flew to the island after hearing about the events on the Crown Petone, rescuing Grosky along the way. Layton and Melina meet up with them, and Emmy recognizes "Melina" as Nina, one of the girls who went missing.

Amelia is brought to Whistler, revealed to be the mastermind behind the game. He declares her the winner, but soon forces her into a machine connected to the Detragan and confesses that there is no eternal life. Layton and company save Amelia, and Layton explains the truth: the Detragan is actually a machine that can copy a person's personality and download their memories into another person's brain. Whistler had conspired with Descole to abduct girls from London and use the Detragan to implant them with his dead daughter's memories as a means of keeping her alive indefinitely. However, none of the abducted girls accepted Melina's memories perfectly, and it eventually left them, as previously demonstrated with Nina. Layton also reveals that Janice was another victim of Whistler's experiments that, unbeknownst to Whistler, was successful in retaining Melina's memories due to their friendship; it was Melina who sought Layton's help in stopping her father from hurting anyone else.

Descole captures Melina and reveals his own motive: to use the Detragan in concert with Melina's singing to raise Ambrosia by playing a pair of melodies found in the island's stone seal, the Song of the Stars and the Song of the Sea. However, his attempts fail, and he turns the Detragan into a gigantic excavation robot, the Detragiganto, which destroys the castle and rampages across the island in a desperate attempt to uncover Ambrosia by force. After the group escapes the castle, Layton and Luke fly the makeship helicopter to rescue Melina. Luke saves Melina from falling off the ship as Layton duels Descole on top of the Detragiganto. During the duel, Layton reveals that Descole had overlooked a third melody hidden in the seal: the Song of the Sun. Again, Melina sings as Layton takes control of the Detragan. The ruins of Ambrosia rise, angering Descole even further and causing him to lunge at Layton. However, he damages the control panel and falls off the machine. Layton, Luke, and Melina escape the Detragiganto as it destroys itself.

Melina decides she cannot take over Janice's life, and, after bidding farewell to her father, Luke, and Layton, her spirit leaves Janice's body, returning Janice control of her body. Whistler plays one last song on the remains of the Detragan, and Janice sings for Melina's memory. As the sun rises over the island, Layton concludes that the true "eternal life" of the people of Ambrosia comes from people in the modern age still speaking tales of them and their beloved queen. Luke wonders if Melina could have been a reincarnation of the queen of Ambrosia, and Layton reminds him of the legend: that Ambrosia would rise again when its beloved queen returned.

== Voice cast ==
Character	Japanese	English
Professor Hershel Layton	Yo Oizumi	Christopher Robin Miller
Luke Triton	Maki Horikita	Maria Darling
Emmy Altava	Saki Aibu	Emma Tate
Janice Quatlane	Nana Mizuki (singing voice in both versions)	Emma Tate
Jean Descole	Atsuro Watabe	Jonathan Keeble
Inspector Clamp Grosky	Hōchū Ōtsuka	Stuart Organ
Oswald Whistler	Iemasa Kayumi	Robbie Stevens
Melina Whistler	Fumiko Orikasa	Emma Tate
Celia Raidley	Kikuko Inoue	Sarah Hadland
Nina	Sumire Morohoshi	Claire Morgan
Curtis O'Donnell	Shōzō Iizuka	Wayne Forester
Marco Brock	Kenta Miyake	David Holt
Amelia Ruth	Megumi Toyoguchi	Claire Morgan
Frederick Bargland	Jouji Nakata	Stuart Organ
Annie Dretche	LiLiCo	Maria Darling
Pierre Starbuck	Kōichi Yamadera	Robbie Stevens
Don Paolo	Minoru Inaba	Christopher Robin Miller
Inspector Chelmey	Shirō Saitō	Christopher Robin Miller
Constable Barton	Hiromi Sugino	Wayne Forester
Flora Reinhold	Mamiko Noto	Claire Morgan
Dr. Andrew Schrader	Rokurō Naya	Stuart Organ

== Home media ==
The film was released in Singapore on March 18, 2010, showing in Japanese with English and Chinese subtitles. Manga Entertainment UK has licensed the film for DVD and Blu-ray Disc release in the United Kingdom in October 2010. The Manga Entertainment release is dubbed by the voice actors used in the UK releases of the game, including several new voice actors, like Sarah Hadland and Wayne Forester. Several versions of the film have been released: a standard DVD release, a standard Blu-ray release, a three-disc DVD and Blu-ray combo pack, and a three-disc collector's edition that includes a 630-page book containing the complete storyboard. The film was also made available for digital purchase via the European Nintendo 3DS eShop on July 7, 2016. The film was released on May 27, 2025, on Blu-ray by Discotek Media in North America.

When asked about a North American release, director Akihiro Hino said, "We don't have any plans to release the movies in America currently, but we'll make sure to let you know if that changes." Viz Media announced they had licensed the film and released it on DVD in North America on November 8, 2011. The DVD was a direct port of the UK version and was not redubbed with the North American voice actors. The film was also released in German as Professor Layton und die ewige Diva and in the Netherlands as Professor Layton en de Eeuwige Diva.

== Soundtracks ==
The game's soundtrack was released in two parts. One, titled "The Eternal Diva- 'Eternal Diva' Original Theme Song Collection / Janice Quatlane", featured vocal performances by Nana Mizuki and was released on December 16, 2009. The other, titled "Professor Layton and the Eternal Diva Original Soundtrack" and featuring compositions by Tomohito Nishiura and Tsuneyoshi Saito, was released on January 23, 2010. The song "The Eternal Diva" is featured on both albums.

The Eternal Diva: Janice Quatlane
No.	Title	Length
1.	"Record of Memories"	1:19
2.	"Let this Happiness be Eternal"	1:46
3.	"A Transient Life's Departure"	2:06
4.	"Janice's Tears"	1:38
5.	"The Eternal Diva"	7:03
6.	"A Song of the Stars"	0:37
7.	"A Song of the Sea"	0:49
8.	"A Song of the Sun"	2:16
9.	"Indigo Memories"	1:39
Total length:		19:13

Professor Layton and the Eternal Diva Original Soundtrack
No.	Title	Length
1.	"Cold Open ~Professor Layton's Theme"	2:38
2.	"Prologue to the Adventure ~Puzzles"	1:27
3.	"Travel Guide ~Descole's Theme (unused)"	1:40
4.	"Compensation 1 ~Detragiganto's Theme"	0:33
5.	"Departure to the Voyage ~Descole's Theme"	2:05
6.	"Detragan's Echoes ~Whistler's Theme"	1:06
7.	"Rules for the Survivors ~An Uneasy Atmosphere"	0:46
8.	"Puzzle Number 001 ~Puzzles Reinvented (from Unwound Future)"	1:56
9.	"Compensation 2 ~Detragiganto's Theme"	0:21
10.	"Puzzle Number 002 ~Puzzles 5 (from Last Specter)"	4:11
11.	"Melina's Tenacity ~An Uneasy Atmosphere (from Diabolical Box)"	0:27
12.	"People of the Past ~The Looming Tower (from Curious Village)"	2:13
13.	"The True Crown ~Descole's Theme"	1:54
14.	"About London ~About Town (from Curious Village)"	0:43
15.	"The Passionate Whistler ~Whistler's Theme"	1:26
16.	"The Legendary Kingdom ~Theme of Ambrosia"	0:56
17.	"Rest ~Time for a Break"	0:53
18.	"Approaching Pursuer 1 ~Approaching Pursuer"	1:18
19.	"Puzzle Number 003 ~Revolutionary Idea"	0:54
20.	"Adjusting the Pace ~Pursuit in the Night (from Curious Village)"	1:11
21.	"Compensation 3 ~Detragiganto's Theme"	0:12
22.	"Escape! ~Professor Layton's Theme"	2:24
23.	"Puzzle Number 004 ~The Plot Thickens (from Curious Village)"	2:07
24.	"Descole Appears ~Descole's Theme"	1:01
25.	"Professor Layton's Piano ~A Song of the Sea"	0:32
26.	"Approaching Pursuer 2 ~Approaching Pursuer"	1:04
27.	"Emmy's Efforts ~Emmy's Theme"	0:31
28.	"Whistler's Experiment ~Dangerous Experiment"	2:10
29.	"The Mystery Explained! ~Professor Layton's Theme"	2:34
30.	"Great Conspiracy ~Descole, Ambrosia's Theme"	2:36
31.	"Prelude to Destruction ~Descole's Theme"	1:07
32.	"Detragiganto Appears ~Detragiganto's Theme"	1:43
33.	"Janice's Crisis ~Tense Decision"	0:21
34.	"Future British Gentleman ~Luke's Theme"	1:53
35.	"The Final Battle ~Time of Conclusion"	1:49
36.	"The Dream Collapses ~Theme of Ambrosia"	1:38
37.	"Father's Memories ~Whistler's Theme"	0:35
38.	"The Feelings Will Always Be Close ~Whistler's Theme"	2:46
39.	"The Eternal Diva / Janice Quatlane (CV Nana Mizuki)"	6:55
Total length:		62:36

== Reception ==
Professor Layton and the Eternal Diva debuted at number 6 at the Japanese box office, grossing $1,074,959 USD during its opening weekend. By the weekend of March 24 to the 26th, the film had grossed $6,140,049 in both Japanese and overseas (Taiwan and Singapore) totals. It was the ninth most watched anime film of the first of half of 2010 in Japan, and the 14th of the entire year. The film went on to gross ¥610 million ($7,643,438) in Japan, and $27,351 overseas (Singapore and Taiwan), for a total of $7,670,789 in Asia.

GameSync.net gave it a positive review, calling it "wholeheartedly entertaining and heartwarming, with a dash of British wit and eccentricity." Martin Robinson of IGN gave the film a positive review stating, "It's not without faults; the climactic scene outstays its welcome, while the production levels don't match those of the top tier of anime. But it is disposable fun that's near certain to put a smile on your face – and that's something we've not been able to say about a video game adaptation for some time."

== Possible sequel ==
The game series' developer and publisher Level-5 have stated that they wished to release a Professor Layton film every winter, and that they are already producing the next film. Besides the animated films, a British/Japanese live-action film was in the works as well. While not committing to a second film, director Akihiro Hino said that the "second season" of the Layton series (which begins with Professor Layton and the Last Specter) was originally imagined by another film.
