= Yumie Nishiogi =

Japanese screenwriter

Yumie Nishiogi (西荻 弓絵; born September 3, 1960) is a Japanese screenwriter. Born in Tokyo and graduated from Keio University.
