= Loft (2005 film) =

- Film poster
- Directed by: Kiyoshi Kurosawa
- Written by: Kiyoshi Kurosawa
- Produced by: Atsuyuki Shimoda; Takashi Kamikura
- Starring: Miki Nakatani; Etsushi Toyokawa
- Cinematography: Akiko Ashizawa
- Edited by: Masahiro Onaga
- Music by: Gary Ashiya
- Production company: Twins Japan
- Release dates: October 8, 2005 (Pusan International Film Festival); September 9, 2006 (Japan)
- Running time: 115 minutes
- Country: Japan
- Language: Japanese

Loft (Japanese: LOFT ロフト, Hepburn: Rofuto) is a 2005 Japanese horror film directed by Kiyoshi Kurosawa, starring Miki Nakatani and Etsushi Toyokawa.

== Plot ==
Reiko Haruna, a prize-winning writer, moves to a quiet suburban house to finish up her new novel. One night, she sees a man in a storage room transporting an object wrapped in cloth. She finds out that he is Makoto Yoshioka, an archaeologist researching ancient mummies, and that object was a recently discovered mummy. Working late on her book, she sees a ghost and finds out that her room once belonged to a woman who disappeared.

== Cast ==
- Miki Nakatani - Reiko Haruna
- Etsushi Toyokawa - Makoto Yoshioka
- Hidetoshi Nishijima - Koichi Kijima
- Yumi Adachi - Aya
- Sawa Suzuki - Megumi Nonomura
- Haruhiko Kato - Murakami
- Ren Osugi - Hino

== Reception ==
Sky Hirschkron of Stylus Magazine gave Loft a "C" grade. However Julien Gester of Les Inrockuptibles titled that the movie had a "disturbing splendor".
