= Hyatt Regency San Francisco Downtown SOMA =

Hotel in San Francisco, California

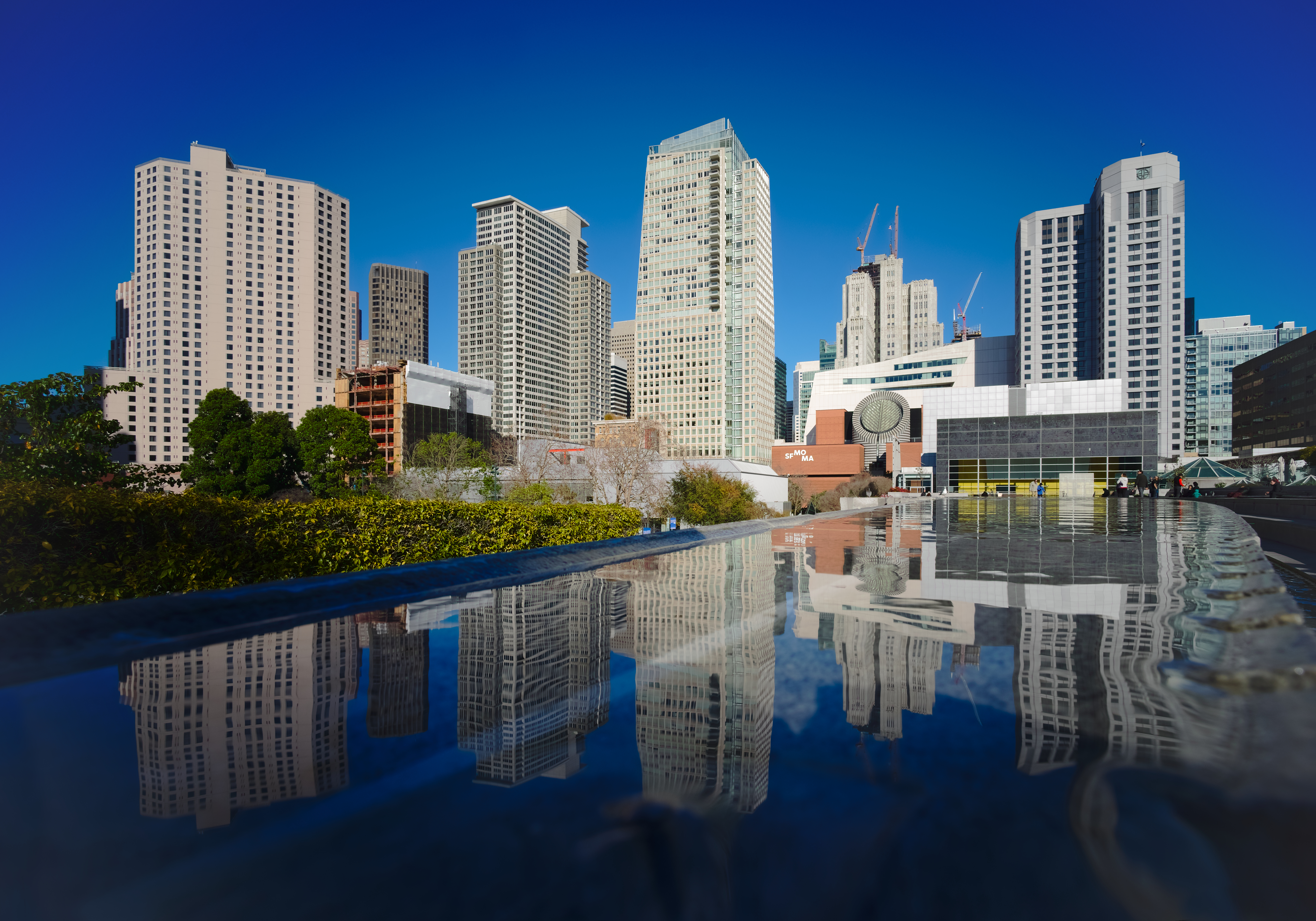
- Hyatt Regency San Francisco Downtown SOMA, on far left, overlooking Yerba Buena Gardens

- Location within San Francisco Hyatt Regency San Francisco Downtown SOMA (California) Hyatt Regency San Francisco Downtown SOMA (the United States)
- Hotel chain: Hyatt Hotels

General information
- Location: 50 Third Street; San Francisco, California
- Coordinates: 37.78654°N 122.40309°W
- Opening: October 1983
- Owner: Highgate Hotels
- Management: Highgate Hotels

Height
- Height: 114 m (374 ft)

Technical details
- Floor count: 36

Design and construction
- Architect: Hornberger + Worstell
- Developer: Arcon/Pacific Ltd.

Other information
- Number of rooms: 686 rooms

The Hyatt Regency San Francisco Downtown SOMA is a 36-story highrise hotel at 50 Third Street in San Francisco, California.

== History ==
The Hotel Meridien San Francisco opened in October 1983, managed by the Meridien Hotels division of Air France, as the first private project of the San Francisco Redevelopment Agency's development in the Yerba Buena district. Democratic candidate Walter Mondale stayed at the hotel during the 1984 Democratic National Convention at the adjacent Moscone Center. The hotel was sold to ANA Hotels for $100 million in 1988 and renamed ANA Hotel San Francisco. Scenes in David Fincher's 1997 film The Game were shot in the hotel. ANA sold it, along with their Washington, DC hotel, to Lowe Enterprises on September 29, 1998 for $270 million. Lowe subsidiary Destination Hotels assumed management, renaming the property The Argent Hotel.

Following its sale in 2005 to Highgate Holdings and Whitehall Street Global Real Estate Partnership, the hotel underwent a $28.3 million renovation in early 2007 and was renamed The Westin Market Street San Francisco on April 12, 2007. LaSalle Hotel Properties acquired the hotel for $350 million on January 23, 2015 and renamed it the Park Central Hotel San Francisco. In November 2018, Pebblebrook Hotel Trust acquired La Salle Hotel Properties for $5.2 billion. Pebblebrook immediately sold a number of La Salle's hotels, including the Park Central, which was bought for $315.2 million by Highgate Hotels, a division of Morgan Stanley. On December 18, 2020, Highgate entered into a franchise agreement for the Park Central to become a Hyatt affiliate hotel, while it was renovated at a cost of $50 million. The renovations added 5 rooms, for a total of 686. At the conclusion of the renovations, the hotel joined the Hyatt Regency brand and was renamed Hyatt Regency San Francisco Downtown SOMA on February 16, 2022.

== Facilities ==
The hotel has 23,000 square feet of meeting and event space, including a 9,000 square-foot ballroom with capacity of up to 1,200 guests.
