= Urban Myth Dissolution Center =

2025 video game

- Developer: Hakababunko
- Publisher: Shueisha Games
- Engine: Unity
- Platforms: Nintendo Switch; PlayStation 5; Windows; Nintendo Switch 2
- Release: PS5, Switch, Windows: February 13, 2025; Nintendo Switch 2: October 28, 2026
- Genre: Adventure
- Mode: Single-player

Urban Myth Dissolution Center (Note: Japanese: 都市伝説解体センタ, Hepburn: Toshi densetsu kaitai senta) is a 2025 adventure video game. In the game, the player controls Azami, who has the ability to see ghosts. She seeks someone who can cure her of this, and goes to the Urban Myth Dissolution Center. There she learns that these visions are actually clairvoyance, which allows her to see traces of past events. She then begins to work with the Center to use her powers to solve mysteries.

The game was developed by Hakababunko team, who previously had difficulty during production on their previous game Wakaidō shin no jikenbo (Note: 和階堂真の事件簿, Toshi densetsu kaitai senta; lit. 'Wakaido Makoto’s Case Files') (2020). To avoid this, they focused on developing a title with specific guidelines to help with project development.

Following the game's release on February 13, 2025, for the Nintendo Switch, PlayStation 5 and via Steam, the game sold over 300,000 units, a strong amount for a Japanese indie game. Based on 19 reviews, the game was described as receiving "generally favorable reviews" from Metacritic.

== Development ==
Urban Myth Dissolution Center was made in Japan by the development team Hakababunko. Prior to developing Urban Myth Dissolution Center, the team had worked on the game Wakaidō shin no jikenbo (2020) which began development in 2018. While working on this earlier title, they felt development had not gone well. To avoid the mistakes made on the previous game, the team began development on Urban Myth Dissolution Center with new guidelines. These involved the team preparing limits, meeting deadlines, and when something happens, they should continue development with the idea of that what they had was still okay enough.

The game was developed with the Unity game engine using their Adventure Creator to alleviate bug testing. They found that the Adventure Creator add-on to the program to be too limited to make an interesting game, and created the SNS mode in the game which was unique. This led to further testing for bugs and missed deadlines. They said that their guideline still reduced the psychological stress of game development despite missing the initially set deadlines.

Huff Huff Oden, the graphic designer for the game said that these restrictions led to a pixel art style for the game saying that it allowed for both unique visuals and reduce the number of development hours of work. The resolution of the game was also made very low at 240 by 135 pixels, which was a lower resolution than the Nintendo Entertainment System console from the 1980s. Some visual effect and animated scenes were outsourced.

The music in the game was made using the music from Alfred Hitchcock films and the television series Stranger Things as the influences. The game's theme song was also outsourced. The music was changed quickly before release on finding that the Nintendo Switch speakers sounded different due to their smaller size which would change how some music sounded. As a result, all the sounds in the game had to be corrected one month before the release.

== Release and reception ==
Reception

Aggregate scores
Aggregator	Score
Metacritic	(NS) 81/100 (PC) 75/100 (PS5) 71/100
OpenCritic	70% recommend (Note: Based on 40 reviews)

Review scores
Publication	Score
Edge	7/10
Eurogamer	3/5
Nintendo World Report	9/10
Shacknews	9/10
Houston Press	9/10
IGN (Italy)	7.5/10
IGN (Korea)	7/10
Silicon Era	9/10

The game was published by Shueisha Games. To help promote the game, the publisher emphasized the pixel art that focused on urban legends and added the "Urban Myth" to the title to make sure audiences knew what the game was about.

To promote the game, writer HafHaf Oden and producer Makoto Hayashi approached development through unconventional marketing methods. Among them was building a giant pyramid at the 2024 Tokyo Game Show and creating real-life mystery games which the developers hosted which aided them in standing out in the crowd and gain new fans from visitors at the event. The game was released. Following its initial release, its sales had exceeded 300,000 units within three months since its release. Tomoyuki Watanabe of IGN Japan sales were quite strong for a Japanese indie game. The game was released in 12 different languages.

Urban Myth Dissolution Center was released in February 13, 2025 for via Steam, and for the PlayStation 5 and Nintendo Switch. A Nintendo Switch 2 Edition released on October 28, 2026.

According to the review aggregation website Metacritic, the Nintendo Switch and PC versions of Urban Myth Dissolution Center both received generally favorable reviews from critics, while the PlayStation 5 version received "mixed or average" reviews from critics. Fellow review aggregator OpenCritic assessed that the game received strong approval, being recommended by 70% of critics.

At the 2025 Japan Game Awards, Urban Myth Dissolution was one of the eleven winners of the "Awards for Excellence".
