= ANA Hotels =

Japanese hospitality brand

IHG ANA Hotels Group Japan LLC.
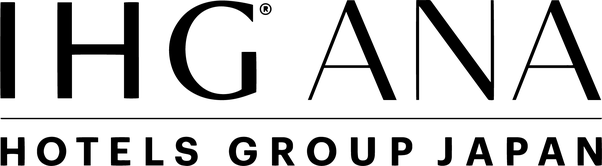
- Type: Hotels
- Industry: Hospitality
- Founded: 1973
- Headquarters: Toranomon, Tokyo, Japan
- Area served: International
- Key people: Abhijay Sandilya (chief executive officer), Kiyohito Iinuma (chief operating officer)
- Products: Hotels
- Parent: IHG Hotels & Resorts
- Divisions: ANA InterContinental; ANA Crowne Plaza; ANA Holiday Inn; ANA Holiday Inn Resort
- Website: www.anaihghotels.co.jp

ANA Hotels (全日空ホテルズ, Zen'nikkū Hoteruzu) is a Japanese hotel chain established in 1973 by All Nippon Airways (ANA). In October 2006, ANA sold majority ownership of ANA Hotels to the InterContinental Hotels Group (IHG), which is now the primary shareholder. The managed properties of ANA Hotels are marketed under the ANA InterContinental, ANA Crowne Plaza, ANA Hotels and ANA Holiday Inn brands.

== History ==
ANA Hotels has been a hotel management company since its establishment in 1973 as a subsidiary of All Nippon Airways Co. Ltd. The airline owned hotels in Japan and, in the 1980s and 1990s, the United States.

On 23 October 2006, the sale of ANA Hotels to InterContinental Hotels Group (IHG) resulted in ANA Hotels becoming mainly owned by IHG, which holds 74% shares in the company, while All Nippon Airways retains 25%; with 1% held by other investors.

On 30 November 2006, ANA Hotels Company Ltd. was renamed to "IHG ANA Hotels Group Japan LLC." to further establish its business description as a hotel operator.

On 13 April 2007, All Nippon Airways sold its 13 domestic hotels to Morgan Stanley for about 280 billion yen. Following its acquisition, the operating rights of each hotel acquired by Morgan Stanley will be unified into "Panorama Hotels One" which was newly established by Panorama Hospitality, a subsidiary company of Morgan Stanley. After that, however, it was split into three companies: Panorama Hotels One Inc., Horizon Hotels One Inc., and Central Hotels Inc. These facilities were gradually withdrawn from capital by sale. In July 2015, Horizon Hotels was sold to Hoshino Resorts, and the transfer to other operating companies was completed.

== Brands ==
Operating under the "IHG ANA Group Hotels", ANA Hotels has managed 33 properties in Japan, with a total inventory of 10,000 guest rooms, 8 InterContinental or ANA InterContinental branded hotels, 19 ANA Crowne Plaza branded hotels and 6 ANA Holiday Inn branded hotels. Since 2007, its acquisition by InterContinental Hotels Group has increased the total guest rooms networked.

== Group hotels ==
=== Japan ===
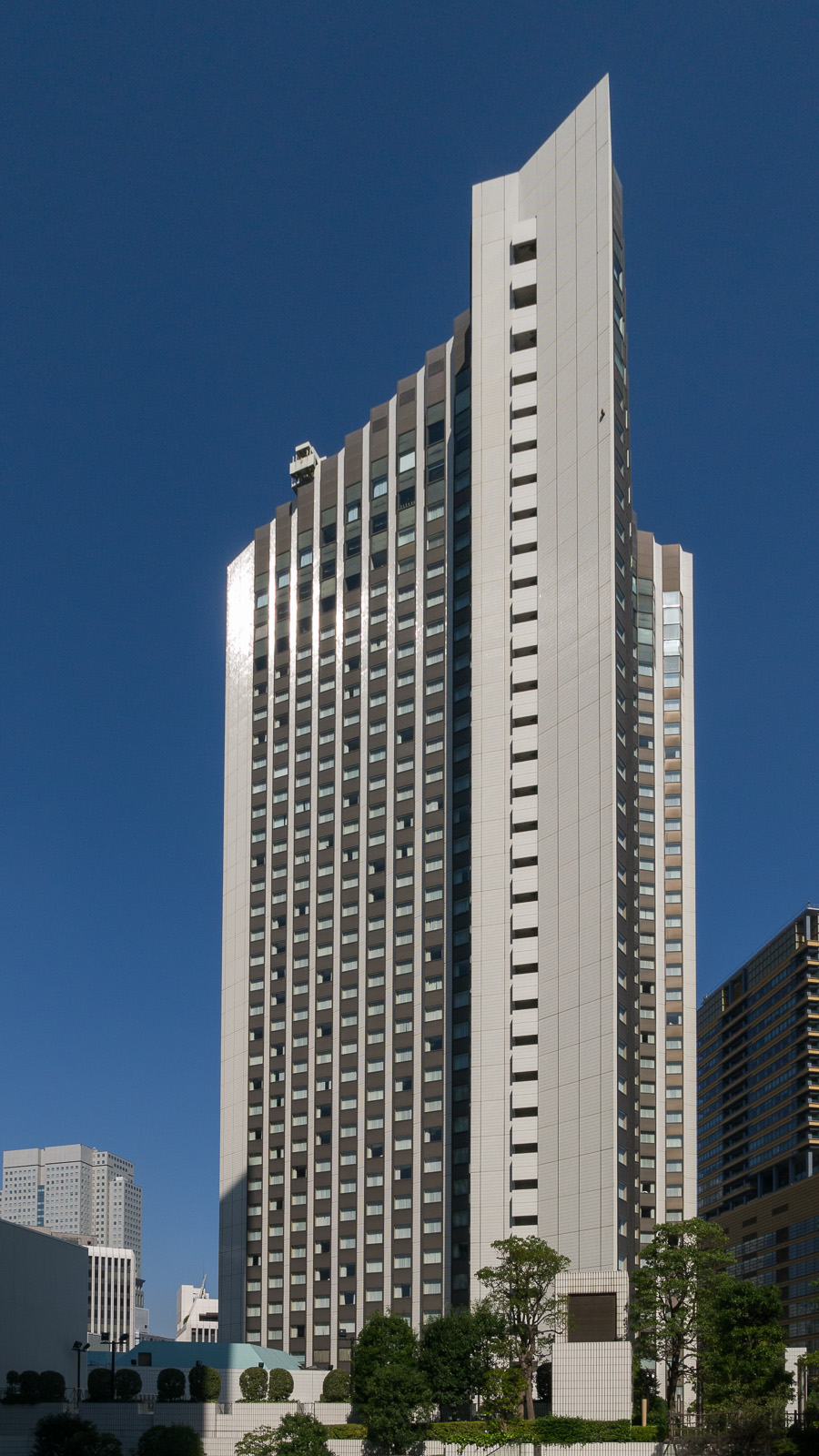
ANA Intercontinental Tokyo, incorporating Ark Hills

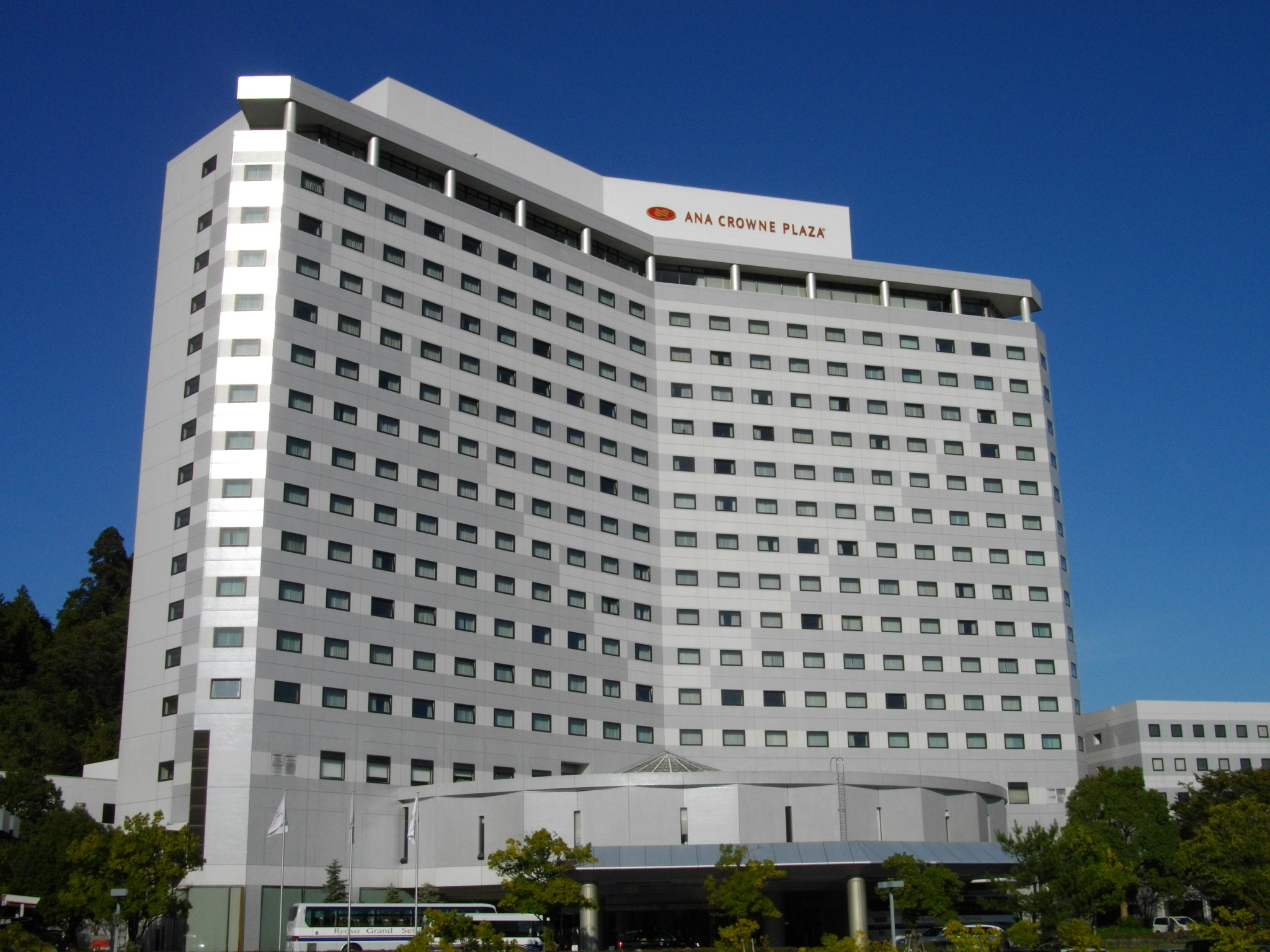
ANA Crowne Plaza Narita, near Narita International Airport

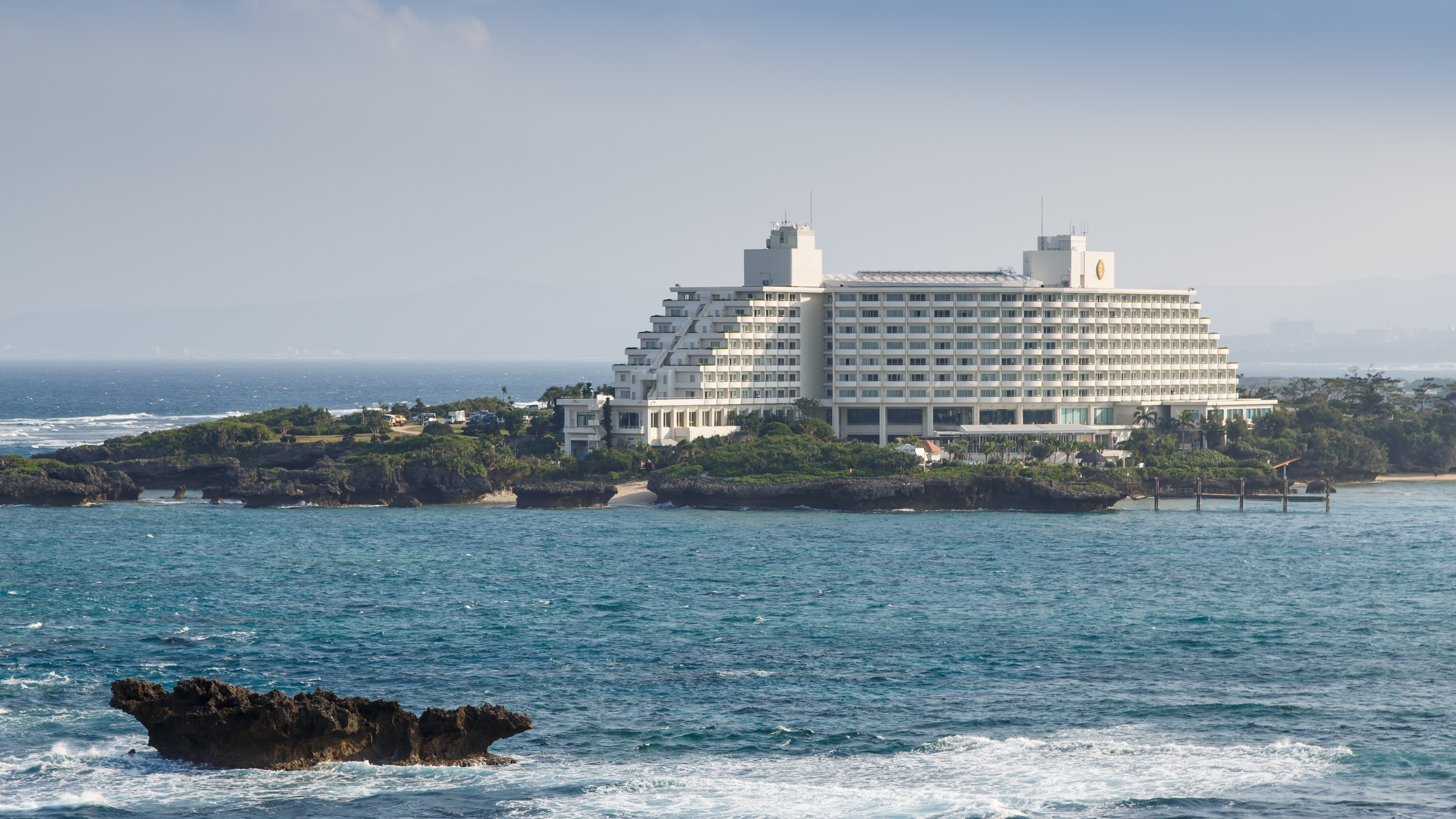
ANA Intercontinental Manza Beach Resort, Onna, Okinawa Prefecture

- Hokkaidō
  - ANA Crowne Plaza Sapporo (Sapporo)
  - ANA Holiday Inn Sapporo Susukino (Sapporo)
  - ANA Crowne Plaza Hotel Chitose (Chitose)
  - ANA Crowne Plaza Hotel Kushiro (Kushiro)
- Tōhoku
  - Miyagi Prefecture
    - ANA Holiday Inn Sendai (Sendai)
- Kantō
  - Chiba Prefecture
    - ANA Crowne Plaza Hotel Narita (Narita)
  - Tokyo
    - ANA Intercontinental Tokyo (Minato)
    - Strings Hotel Tokyo Intercontinental (Shinagawa)
- Chūbu
  - Aichi Prefecture
    - ANA Crowne Plaza Hotel Grand Court Nagoya (Nagoya)
  - Ishikawa Prefecture
    - ANA Crowne Plaza Hotel Kanazawa (Kanazawa)
    - ANA Holiday Inn Kanazawa Sky (Kanazawa)
  - Niigata Prefecture
    - ANA Crowne Plaza Hotel Niigata (Niigata)
  - Toyama Prefecture
    - ANA Crowne Plaza Hotel Toyama (Toyama)
- Kansai
  - Hyōgo Prefecture
    - ANA Crowne Plaza Hotel Kobe (Kobe)
  - Kyoto Prefecture
    - ANA Crowne Plaza Hotel Kyoto (Kyoto)
  - Osaka Prefecture
    - ANA Crowne Plaza Osaka (Osaka)
    - Holiday Inn Osaka Namba (Osaka)
- Chūgoku
  - Hiroshima Prefecture
    - ANA Crowne Plaza Hiroshima (Hiroshima)
  - Okayama Prefecture
    - ANA Crowne Plaza Hotel Okayama (Okayama)
  - Tottori Prefecture
    - ANA Crowne Plaza Yonago (Yonago)
  - Yamaguchi Prefecture
    - ANA Crowne Plaza Ube (Ube)
- Shikoku
  - Ehime Prefecture
    - ANA Crowne Plaza Hotel Matsuyama (Matsuyama)
- Kyūshū
  - Fukuoka Prefecture
    - ANA Crowne Plaza Fukuoka (Fukuoka)
  - Kumamoto Prefecture
    - ANA Crowne Plaza Hotel Kumamoto New Sky (Kumamoto)
  - Nagasaki Prefecture
    - ANA Crowne Plaza Hotel Nagasaki Gloverhill (Nagasaki)
  - Miyazaki Prefecture
    - ANA Holiday Inn Resort Miyazaki (Miyazaki)
  - Ōita Prefecture
    - ANA Intercontinental Beppu Resort & Spa (Beppu)
- Okinawa
  - ANA Intercontinental Manza Beach Resort (Onna)
  - ANA Intercontinental Ishigaki Resort (Ishigaki)

=== Overseas ===
- South Korea
  - Intercontinental Grand Seoul Parnas (Seoul)
  - Intercontinental COEX Seoul (Seoul)

=== Previous hotel properties ===
- ANA Crowne Plaza Hotel Wakkanai, Wakkanai, Hokkaidō (now Surfeel Hotel Wakkanai)
- Hakodate Harbor Hotel, Hakodate, Hokkaidō (now Four Points by Sheraton Hakodate)
- Hotel Castle, Yamagata, Yamagata Prefecture
- Bandai Sliver Hotel, Niigata, Niigata Prefecture
- ANA Tower Gate Hotel Osaka, Izumisano, Osaka Prefecture (now Star Gate Hotel Kansai Airport)
- ANA Hotel Clement Takamatsu, Takamatsu, Kagawa Prefecture (now JR Hotel Clement Takamatsu)
- Century Park Sheraton Manila ANA Hotel, Manila, Philippines (Now Century Park Hotel)
- Huis Ten Bosch ANA JR Hotel, Sasebo, Nagasaki Prefecture (now Hotel Okura JR Huis Ten Bosch)
- Oita ANA Hotel Oasis Tower, Ōita, Ōita Prefecture (now Hotel Nikko Oita Oasis Tower)
- ANA Crowne Plaza Hotel Okinawa Harbor View, Naha, Okinawa Prefecture (now Hotel Okinawa Harbor View)
- Laguna Garden Hotel, Ginowan, Okinawa Prefecture
- ANA Harbour Grand Hotel Sydney, Sydney (now Shangri-La Hotel Sydney)
- ANA Surfers Paradise, Gold Coast Queensland Australia. (Now Mantra on View Surfers Paradise)

== See also ==
- IHG Hotels & Resorts
