= Nishino (disambiguation) =

Nishino is a Japanese surname.

Nishino may also refer to:

- Nishino (novel series), a light novel series
- Nishino Daisy, a Japanese Thoroughbred racehorse
- Nishino Flower, a Japanese Thoroughbred racehorse
