= Hitomi Mieno =

Japanese singer and screenwriter (born 1977)

Hitomi Mieno 三重野 瞳
- Also known as: Deko Akao
- Born: December 21, 1977 (age 48); Fukuoka Prefecture, Japan
- Occupations: Singer, screenwriter
- Years active: 1994–present
- Website: ameblo.jp/hitodama1103/

Hitomi Mieno (三重野 瞳, Mieno Hitomi; born December 21, 1977 in Fukuoka Prefecture) is a Japanese singer and screenwriter. She has released 17 singles and 11 albums since her debut in 1994. Several of her songs have been used as openings and endings of anime and radio dramas. She has also written the screenplays of various anime series under the alias of Deko Akao (赤尾 でこ, Akao Deko), including Noragami, Frame Arms Girl and After the Rain.

== Discography ==
=== Albums ===
- KI ･ RA ･ RI PI ･ KA ･ RI (May 3, 1995)
- All Weather Girl (December 16, 1995)
- ドラムカンサラダ (December 17, 1997)
- ベリー☆ロール (August 21, 1998)
- 真空パック〜シングル・コレクション〜 (March 20, 1999)
- 23.4 (July 23, 1999)
- 最高最強のうそつきになってやる。 (August 23, 2000)
- Baby Leaf (September 21, 2001)
- 10歳 (October 8, 2003)
- 2930〜にくみそ〜 (December 19, 2007)
- 20歳 (August 27, 2014) ("best of")

=== Singles ===
- "瞳にDiamond" (June 22, 1994) Ending of Haō Taikei Ryū Knight anime television series
- "Run -今日が変わるMagic-" (October 21, 1994)
- "未知への扉" (December 16, 1994) Opening of 聖刻覇伝 ラシュオーンの嵐 radio drama
- "Wonderful Bravo!" (May 24, 1995) Opening of ゴクドーくん漫遊記外伝2 JAJA姫武遊伝 radio drama
- "はじまりの冒険者たち" (July 21, 1995) Ending of Legend of Crystania anime film
- "Dollたちの独立記念日" (October 21, 1995) Opening of Haō Taikei Ryū Knight radio drama
- "Future" (November 21, 1996) Opening of 魔神英雄伝ワタル外伝 ピュア ピュア ヒミコ radio drama
- "風のシンフォニー" (June 4, 1997)
- "ひとつのハートで" (November 6, 1997) Opening of Cho Mashin Hero Wataru anime
- "BOYS BE AMBITIOUS" (November 6, 1997) Ending of Cho Mashin Hero Wataru anime
- "POWER OF DREAM" (April 22, 1998) Opening of Cho Mashin Hero Wataru anime
- "がんばって" (April 22, 1998) Ending of Cho Mashin Hero Wataru anime
- "瞳 Fall in Love" (July 23, 1998)
- "ガリレオの夜" (May 21, 1999) Theme song of 瞳と光央の爆発ラジオ
- "ゆっくり" (April 21, 2001) Ending of UFO Baby anime
- "Dearest" (July 25, 2001) Opening of I My Me! Strawberry Eggs anime
- "瞳でEle-phant!" (August 27, 2014)

==== Other songs ====
- W – Infinity Opening of Gear Fighter Dendoh anime
- 風の翼 Opening of Haō Taikei Ryū Knight: Adeu's Legend original video animation

== Screenwriting credits ==
• all credits are under the name of Deko Akao unless otherwise noted
• head writer credits are denoted in bold

=== Television ===
- Lime-iro Ryukitan X (2005)
- Akahori Gedou Hour Rabuge (2005)
- Happy Seven (2005)
- Lemon Angel Project (2006)
- Yes! PreCure 5 (2007)
- Fantastic Detective Labyrinth (2007–2008)
- Yes! PreCure 5 GoGo! (2008)
- Hell Girl: Three Vessels (2008): as Hitomi Mieno
- Natsu no Arashi! (2009)
- **Asura Cryin'** (2009): season 2 head writer
- Yatterman (2009)
- Fresh Pretty Cure! (2009–2010)
- Gokujo!! Mecha Mote Iincho (2009–2011)
- **Arakawa Under the Bridge** (2010)
- **Arakawa Under the Bridge x Bridge** (2010)
- Bakugan Battle Brawlers: New Vestroia (2011)
- Bakugan: Gundalian Invaders (2011)
- **Astarotte's Toy** (2011)
- Abnormal Physiology Seminar (2011)
- **Pretty Rhythm: Aurora Dream** (2011–2012)
- Bakugan: Mechtanium Surge (2011–2012)
- **Mysterious Girlfriend X** (2012)
- My Little Monster (2012)
- **Pretty Rhythm: Dear My Future** (2012–2013)
- **Pretty Rhythm: Rainbow Live**
- **BlazBlue Alter Memory** (2013)
- **Meganebu!** (2013)
- **Meshimase Lodoss-to Senki: Sorette Oishii no?** (2014)
- **Noragami** (2014)
- Turning Mecard (2015)
- **Etotama** (2015)
- **Noragami Aragoto** (2015)
- Gintama Season 3 (2015–2016)
- Omakase! Miracle Cat-dan (2015–2016)
- **Snow White with the Red Hair** (2015–2016)
- Kamisama Minarai: Himitsu no Cocotama (2015–2018)
- **Flying Witch** (2016)
- Age 12 (2016)
- **B-Project ~Kodo*Ambitious~** (2016)
- First Love Monster (2016)
- **Amanchu!** (2016)
- **3-Nen D-Gumi Glass no Kamen** (2016)
- **Urara Meirocho** (2017)
- **Frame Arms Girl** (2017)
- **Anonymous Noise** (2017)
- PriPri Chi-chan!! (2017)
- Hitorijime My Hero (2017)
- Snack World (2017–2018)
- **Amanchu! Advance** (2018)
- **How to Keep a Mummy** (2018)
- **After the Rain** (2018)
- **Rokuhōdō Yotsuiro Biyori** (2018)
- **Ongaku Shōjo** (2018)
- Merc Storia: The Apathetic Boy and the Girl in a Bottle (2018)
- **Real Girl** (2018–2019)
- Layton Mystery Tanteisha: Katori no Nazotoki File (2018–2019)
- Zoids Wild (2018–2019)
- Kira Kira Happy Hirake! Cocotama (2018–2019)
- **My Roommate Is a Cat** (2019)
- Carole & Tuesday (2019)
- Inazuma Eleven: Orion no Kokuin (2019)
- **Do You Love Your Mom and Her Two-Hit Multi-Target Attacks?** (2019)
- **High School Prodigies Have It Easy Even In Another World** (2019)
- **Assassins Pride** (2019)
- Pokémon Journeys: The Series (2019–2020)
- **If My Favorite Pop Idol Made It to the Budokan, I Would Die** (2020)
- **Shadowverse** (2020–2021)
- Yo-kai Watch Jam – Yo-kai Academy Y: Close Encounters of the N Kind (2020–2021)
- Pokémon Master Journeys: The Series (2020–2021)
- Pokémon Ultimate Journeys: The Series (2021–2022)
- **Suppose a Kid from the Last Dungeon Boonies Moved to a Starter Town** (2021)
- **Higehiro** (2021)
- **The Detective Is Already Dead** (2021)
- **The Dungeon of Black Company** (2021)
- **Komi Can't Communicate** (2021–2022)
- **The Case Study of Vanitas** (2021–2022)
- **The Genius Prince's Guide to Raising a Nation Out of Debt** (2022)
- **Shadowverse Flame** (2022–present)
- **Miss Shachiku and the Little Baby Ghost** (2022)
- **My Stepmom's Daughter Is My Ex** (2022)
- **When Will Ayumu Make His Move?** (2022)
- **In Another World with My Smartphone 2nd Season** (2023)
- **Kizuna no Allele** (2023)
- **The Most Heretical Last Boss Queen** (2023)
- Synduality: Noir (2023)
- **Ragna Crimson** (2023)
- **Butareba: The Story of a Man Turned into a Pig** (2023)
- **Tearmoon Empire** (2023)
- **Sasaki and Peeps** (2024)
- **Tales of Wedding Rings** (2024)
- **Fluffy Paradise** (2024)
- **Doctor Elise: The Royal Lady with the Lamp** (2024)
- **Unnamed Memory** (2024)
- **VTuber Legend: How I Went Viral After Forgetting to Turn Off My Stream** (2024)
- **A Terrified Teacher at Ghoul School!** (2024)
- **How I Attended an All-Guy's Mixer** (2024)
- **You Are Ms. Servant** (2024)
- **Sword of the Demon Hunter: Kijin Gentōshō** (2025)
- **The Unaware Atelier Master** (2025)
- **Witch Watch** (2025)
- **Welcome to the Outcast's Restaurant!** (2025)
- **Yano-kun's Ordinary Days** (2025)
- **May I Ask for One Final Thing?** (2025)
- **From Overshadowed to Overpowered** (2026)
- **Oh Boy, Was I Wrong About Her** (2026)
- **A Tale of the Secret Saint** (2026)
- **Gacha Girls Corps** (2027)
- **Isshiki-san Wants to Know About Love** (2027)
- **Now That We Draw** (2027)
- **The Kept Man of the Princess Knight** (2027)
- **KuKu-Loop: The 100th Time's the Charm** (2027)

=== Films ===
- Fly Out, Pripara: Aim for it with Everyone! Idol Grand Prix (2015)
- Frame Arms Girl: Kyakkyau Fufu na Wonderland (2019)

=== OVAs ===
- Magical Princess Minky Momo: A Duo of Sincerity Toward a Dream of Longing (TBA)
