= Inazuma Eleven: Ares =

- Key visual
- No. of episodes: 26

Release
- Original network: TXN (TV Tokyo, TV Osaka)
- Original release: April 6 – September 28, 2018

Series chronology
- ← Previous; GO: Galaxy Next → Orion

Inazuma Eleven: Ares (イナズマイレブン アレスの天秤, Inazuma Irebun Aresu no Tenbin; lit. "Inazuma Eleven: Scale of Ares") is a 2018 Japanese television anime television series produced by OLM. Part of the Inazuma Eleven franchise, it is a sequel to the special Inazuma Eleven: Reloaded, which takes place in an alternate timeline where the original anime's Alius Academy arc never happened. A sequel series, Inazuma Eleven: Orion no Kokuin, started airing on October 5, 2018. An English dub of the series, produced by SDI Media, began airing on Disney XD on April 13, 2019, replacing Yo-kai Watch, another anime based on a Level-5 video game series by the same dubbing company. This is the third Inazuma Eleven series to receive an English dub after the original series and Inazuma Eleven GO.

== Plot summary ==
Ares depicts an alternative canon following the events of the first season of the original Inazuma Eleven anime after their victory in the Football Frontier, with the alien attack from the second season never occurring. When Japanese soccer has been deemed weak compared to international competition, the Raimon Eleven disband with its members transferring into different soccer teams across the country to strengthen Japan's soccer at a national level. Furthermore, sponsorship has become a vital aspect in a Japanese youth soccer team's survival, as it prevents a team's disbandment, while being essential to partake in matches.

The series focuses on the forward Asuto Inamori and his team, Inakuni Raimon, which is made up of players from the remote Inakunijima Island. Needing to maintain their club, they have replaced the original Raimon Eleven as Raimon Junior High's soccer team and compete as underdogs in the annual Football Frontier youth tournament. The team faces multiples challenges throughout their journey but manages to win the tournament.

== Cast ==
Character	Japanese voice actor	English dubbing actor
Sonny Wright (Asuto Inamori (稲森 明日人))	Ayumu Murase	Kyle McCarley
Elliot Ember (Ryōhei Haizaki (灰崎 凌兵))	Hiroshi Kamiya; Tomo Muranaka (young)	Steve Cannon; Cristina Valenzuela (young)
Heath Moore (Yūma Nosaka (野坂 悠馬))	Jun Fukuyama	Lucien Dodge
Valentin Eisner (Kirina Hiura (氷浦 貴利名))	Sōma Saitō	Lucien Dodge
Sandra Fischer (Norika Umihara (海腹 のりか))	Ai Kayano	Cherami Leigh
Nino Nango (Hanta Hattori (服部 半太))	Haruka Tomatsu	Christine Marie Cabanos
Cliff Parker (Takashi Iwato (岩戸 高志)))	Kenta Miyake	Kaiji Tang
Maxime Dassier (Tatsumi Michinari (道成 達巳))	Ryohei Kimura	Kaiji Tang
Cesar Montalban (Hiro Okuiri (奥入 祐))	Natsuki Hanae	Griffin Burns
Adriano Donati (Tetsunosuke Gōjin (剛陣 鉄之助))	Shunsuke Takeuchi	Tony Azzolino
Trevor Cook (Yūichiro Mansaku (万作 雄一郎))	Takahiro Sakurai	Johnny Yong Bosch
Kiko Calavente (Masakatsu Hiyori (日和 正勝))	Yuka Terasaki	Erika Harlacher
Basile Hardy (Sasuke Kozōmaru (小憎丸 サスケ)	Yuki Kaji	Bryce Papenbrook
Mister Yi (Jinyun Zhao (趙 金雲))	Yuichi Nakamura	Chris Smith
Axel Blaze (Shūya Gōenji (豪炎寺 修也))	Hirofumi Nojima	Nathan Sharp
Hunter Foster (Tatsuya Kiyama (基山 タツヤ)	Takahiro Mizushima	Nathan Sharp
Dean Rush (Yukinori Kameda (亀田 幸則))	Haruo Yamagishi	Richard Epcar
Aurelia Dingle (Tsukushi Ōtani (大谷 つくし))	Akane Fujita	Christine Marie Cabanos
Regina Mulgrave (Anna Mikado (神門 杏奈))	Rie Takahashi	Cristina Valenzuela
Jude Sharp (Yūto Kidō (鬼道 有人))	Hiroyuki Yoshino	Bryce Papenbrook
Byron Love/Aphrodite (Terumi Afuro/Aphrodi (亜風炉 照美/アフロディ))	Yūko Sanpei	Griffin Burns
Duske Grayling (Seiya Nishikage (西蔭 政也))	Kenichi Suzumura	Kaiji Tang
Nathan Swift (Ichirōta Kazemaru (風丸一郎太))	Yuka Nishigaki	Griffin Burns
Faith Winter (Akane Miyano (宮野 茜))	Haruka Tomatsu	Erika Harlacher
Xavier Schiller (Hiroto Kira (吉良 ヒロト))	Toshiki Masuda; Ryoko Shiraishi (young)	Griffin Burns; Cristina Valenzuela (young)
Shawn Froste (Shirō Fubuki (吹雪 士郎))	Mamoru Miyano	Johnny Yong Bosch
Aiden Froste (Atsuya Fubuki (吹雪 アツヤ))	Mamoru Miyano	Brian Beacock
Mark Evans (Mamoru Endō (円堂 守))	Junko Takeuchi	Lucien Dodge
Caleb Stonewall (Akio Fudō (不動 明王))	Yuki Kaji	Nathan Sharp
Joseph "Joe" King (Kōjirō "Genō" Genda (源田 "げんおう" 幸次郎))	Yuichi Nakamura	Brian Beacock
Othman Laspic (Midōin Munetada (御堂院 宗忠))	Yuichi Nakamura	Richard Epcar
Ray Dark (Reiji Kageyama (影山 零治))	Seiji Sasaki	Richard Epcar
Jack Wallside (Heigorō Kabeyama (壁山 塀吾郎))	Megumi Tano	
Bunny Cottontail (Nae Shiratoya (白兎屋 なえ))	Inori Minase	Erika Harlacher
The Murdock triplets		
Jimmy Wongfu (Hao Li (リ・ハオ))	Yuka Terasaki	Brian Beacock
David "Dvalin" Quagmire (Osamu "Desarm" Saginuma (万作 "デザーム" 雄一郎))	Takashi Hikida	Lucien Dodge
Chester Horse (Ōshō Kakuma (角馬 王将))	Tetsu Inada	Michael Sorich

== Music ==
- Opening: "To the Top" (てっぺんへダッシュ!; "Teppen e Dash!") by pugcat's
- Ending: "A Girl in Love is a Sign of Rain" (恋する乙女は雨模様; "Koisuru Otome wa Amemoyou") by alom

== Episode list ==
No.	English title (Translated title)	Original release date	English air date
1	"Departure to Tomorrow" (Setting Sail to Tomorrow); Transliteration: "Asu e no Funade" (Japanese: 明日への船出)	April 6, 2018	April 13, 2019
Sonny Wright and a group of soccer players on the small Backwater Island has their club on the verge of disbandment due to lacking a sponsor. Shortly after, Sonny's mother passes away. Disheartened by the loss of the things he loves, Sonny takes the challenge of going into the Football Frontier tournament in order to gain the interest of a sponsor to keep their team alive. However, when they are transferred to Tokyo on the mainland to compete under the Raimon club, they are put up against Polestar Academy, a much stronger team. Basile Hardy gives the team an unexpected lead against their opponents with a Special Move, but Polestar's players begin to prepare a move of their own.
2	"The Demon on the Pitch" (The Devil of the Field); Transliteration: "Fīrudo no Akuma" (Japanese: フィールドの悪魔)	April 6, 2018	April 13, 2019
A week before their match with Polestar, Backwater Island's soccer club players settle into their new club at Raimon. They try out their new uniforms, learn about the Eleven Bands, and train for the first time with their manager - a Chinese man named Mister Yi. They also settle down at the Windsor Manor, their place to stay while they're on the mainland. Their match with Polestar, despite their early lead, turns up in disaster, as Polestar's ace striker, Elliot Ember - the "Demon on the Pitch" - shows his true strength. Although the match ended in Polestar's favor 1-10, Raimon's persistence catches the eye of a representative from Island Tours, who agrees to sponsor their team.
3	"The Mysterious Mister Yi" (The Mysterious Manager Zhao Jinyun); Transliteration: "Nazo no Kantoku Chō Kin'un" (Japanese: 謎の監督趙金雲)	April 20, 2018	April 20, 2019
Raimon learns that they can still continue to participate in the Football Frontier. Their next match is against Rampart Jr. High, a team known for their fortress technique that prevents people from scoring against them. Mister Yi, however, insists that they exclusively practice defense. While most of the team has to endure his training, Cliff and Valentin are selected to do chores instead. Cliff has to clean graffiti on walls around the school, while Valentin has to water. As their match grows closer, the players are left frustrated not knowing what this strange training is going to amount to.
4	"Breakdown Their Walls! The Impenetrable Fortress" (Will It Fall?! The Impregnable Fortress); Transliteration: "Otoseru ka! Nankōfuraku no Yōsai" (Japanese: 落とせるか！難攻不落の要塞)	April 27, 2018	April 27, 2019
The match between Raimon and Rampart begins. Mister Yi insists that Raimon only defends, and it soon appears that his strategy is awaiting on Rampart's manager to grow impatient and give them the orders to attack first and let their guard down. Cliff and Valentin's chores bring out new special moves. The match ends 2-0 in Raimon's victory.
5	"The Darkness of Polestar Academy" (The Darkness of Seisho Academy); Transliteration: "Seishō Gakuen no Yami" (Japanese: 星章学園の闇)	May 4, 2018	May 4, 2019
The Prestigious school Polestar Academy that is ranked number 1, is the football club who is preparing for the preliminary match against Kirkwood Junior high tomorrow, but he himself, the isolated Elliot did not intend to practice and was not going to participate in the game because he did not get in the mood. Elliot who visited the hospital to visit her childhood friend Faith Winter after school. Elliot continues to keep his mind constantly as usual Elliot swore to revenge on football to "Balance of Ares" who broke her heart. At that time, on the TV in the hospital room, special features during Kirkwood Junior high cleanup. In an interview, seeing that the Ace striker Axel Blaze is provoking him, Elliot decides to participate in the qualifying match tomorrow. However, on the day of the match, the strategy that the absolute leader of the Kirkwood Junior high and the Offensive strategy set up was surprising...!
6	"The Flame Striker" (The Flame Ace Striker); Transliteration: "Honō no Ēsu Sutoraikā" (Japanese: 炎のエースストライカー)	May 11, 2018	May 11, 2019
Battle in the middle of Polestar Academy vs. Kirkwood Junior high. Elliot is a goalkeeper who was overwhelmed by "Fire Tornado" of Australia's Temple and allowed the first strike reveals regret and anger. Starry chapter school Eleven, Jude develops intense match-up with former team-mate Australia Temple and turns to counterattack. However, he can't keep up with Axel which shows advanced collaborative play in advance. And after receiving the override technique "Fire Ball Storm" of Axel and the Murdock triplets, Elliot allowed the score again. Why do you use forward as your goalkeeper ... Elliot stuffs up on the ambassador without being angry? However, Jude says, "If you do not know why you are the goalkeeper, you cannot win against the offense of Kirkwood even if you return as the forward."
7	"Seeing The Light" (The Light That Comes into Sight); Transliteration: "Mie Hajimeru Hikari" (Japanese: 見え始める光)	May 18, 2018	June 1, 2019
The second half of the game is also 10 minutes left. Polestar Academy chasing two points. Elliot evolves as a true ace striker. Elliot began to show a movement that seems to be a mistake with the play style so far, easily removes the strict marks in Kirkwood. And the folk acted a deadly technique, and he picked up one point. Continuously continuing through a thorough and fast path turn of communication, the middle of the Kirkwood Junior high refreshing to come to Polestar Academy. Although it is a star school Kirkwood which has been energetically centered on Elliot, "Fire Tornado" of Axel Blaze bursts and one point is added. The difference is 2 points in the remaining 5 minutes .... Polestar Academy is still struggling, can they grasp on to victory !?
8	"A Day Without Mister Yi" (A Day Without the Manager); Transliteration: "Kantoku no Inai Hi" (Japanese: 監督のいない日)	May 25, 2018	June 8, 2019
How, Mister Yi has been arrested?! Three days before going back... When the manager tried to announce the "new trials" towards the middle fighting of Mikage senior farming in quiz style as usual, the police suddenly came to the club room! "We are arrested on suspicion of unauthorized access", and they took Mister Yi in. Since then he has not returned, and the time of kickoff is approaching, it is not even that day .... At the time Raimon Eleven decided to prepare, "The only thing we have to do is deal with it ourselves", the manager's directive to the Eleven Band "I will use the example emergency strategy this time!" People are going to practice various strategies that may be usable in case of emergency but may not be used... tomorrow people. In this "gloomy situation", Raimon Eleven can extend the points!
9	"Ray Dark's Ingenious Scheme" (Commander Kageyama Reiji's Clever Scheme); Transliteration: "Sōsui Kageyama Reiji no Kisaku" (Japanese: 総帥 影山零治の奇策)	June 1, 2018	June 15, 2019
Kanemon Mid VS Royal Academy fight started. Imperial school which decided to challenge the game with a new spike by instructions from Kageyama. In addition, as a result of joining the new member Shimerigawa, unsteady air flows through the team. There was a figure of a windmill staring at the back of Sakuma with a dark eyes as if the darkness fell. On the other hand, although the Raimon was wary of the movement of Royal Academy, shoot opportunities arrive early.
10	"Emperor Penguin VS Polar Bear" (Clash! Emperor Penguin VS Polar Bear!!); Transliteration: "Gekitotsu! Kōtei Pengin VS Hokkyoku Guma!!" (Japanese: 激突！皇帝ペンギンVS北極グマ!!)	June 8, 2018	June 22, 2019
The remaining time is also slightly afterwards. In the Raimon suffered by the killing tactics of Royal Academy. At that time Mister Yi finally moved! Mister Yi vs Ray Dark, both coaches' thoughts swirling, an incandescent game is developed that does not give a step. Sakuma and immobility of Royal Academy will also unleash their last thoughts in their hearts. Whether the victorious goddess will smile at ease...! What? Finally got a name to leave a name in history, finally settled.
11	"Night Before the Finals, Sonny's Resolve" (The Night Before the Battle, Asuto's Decision); Transliteration: "Kessen Zenya Asuto no Ketsui" (Japanese: 決戦前夜 明日人の決意)	June 15, 2018	June 29, 2019
Tomorrow people who came to the stadium where the Polestar Academy fight is held to see hot play of Elliot again. However, he encounters with Elliot who does not participate in the game and stand. Heath Moore who appeared there with his friend Dusk Grayling, triggered by a casual word, Elliot stuck to Heath. And finally, just before the final game of preliminary rounds in Raimon, Sonny is given a single envelope from Mrs. Yone. That was a letter from my mother.
12	"Elliot Ember on Fire" (Burning Haizaki); Transliteration: "Moeru Haizaki" (Japanese: 燃える灰崎)	June 22, 2018	July 6, 2019
The final match of the preliminary round league, Raimon VS Polestar Academy. Elliot's onslaught will not stop. Inashima who enjoys football purely Haizaki's attack on tomorrow' s hostility is exactly "demon of the field" itself. When Kanemon begins to see the color of impatience and disappointment, tomorrow people cast words to their colleagues.
13	"The Final Stages of the Storm!" (Fierce! The Final Stage of the Storm!!); Transliteration: "Sōzetsu! Arashi no Saishū Kyokumen!!" (Japanese: 壮絶！嵐の最終局面!!)	June 29, 2018	July 13, 2019
Raimon Eleven, who is trying to get over to playing Polestar Academy, centering on Elliot. Elliot who will appeal tomorrow who believes that "Absolutely win" while the two teams' captain Mizukamiya and Maxime confrontation and intense ball competition continue. Latter half of the game, the remaining time is only a little. Elliot cuts towards the goal and one fight of a man tomorrow standing in front of it.
14	"The Moonlight Emperor"; Transliteration: "Gekkō no Enperā" (Japanese: 月光のエンペラー)	July 6, 2018	July 20, 2019
The Football frontier final match opens! The eleven teams of the teams who make a spectacular entrance march. There was also a figure of the Imperial Moon in the Imperial Palace, which is said to be the winning candidate, as it was the first time for the tournament. Captain Heath talks that he will be able to understand the wonder of 'Balance of Ares' in their play. The story of Heath Moore, the 3rd protagonist, wrapped in a mysterious veil, finally opens the curtain ...!
15	"The Emperor's Anguish"; Transliteration: "Kōtei no Kunō" (Japanese: 皇帝の苦悩)	July 13, 2018	July 27, 2019
The first game of the finals tournament. Polestar Academy was forced to struggle in front of the emperor's shogunate. Elliot approaches with an imminent opponent who can never lose. On the other hand, Heath's facial expression, which should be in the dominant position, is dark and it will blur even the impatience. Meanwhile, Zeus junior high vs Raimon Eleven game was a fierce battle between both teams. Zeus who is standing in a pinch in Raimon's attack. However, a smile appeared at the mouth of Bryon...
16	"The Snow Princes of Alpine" (The Double Prince of the Snowfield); Transliteration: "Setsugen no Daburu Purinsu" (Japanese: 雪原のダブルプリンス)	July 20, 2018	August 3, 2019
The match between Alpine junior high and Raimon Eleven finally started. However during the match, inspired by the weave play made by snowstorm brothers and Aiden's strategy, internal division occurred between Raimon Eleven... Could it be possible for people to overcome this pinch tomorrow?
17	"Operation Snow Princess!" (Explosion! Operation Snow Princess); Transliteration: "Bakuretsu! Yuki Hime Daisakusen" (Japanese: 爆裂！雪姫大作戦！)	July 27, 2018	August 10, 2019
Bonny Cottontail enters the field on the manager's nod. She shows some extreme speed and manages to play with the rest of the Alpine team. Can Raimon Eleven figure out how to stop this new threat?
18	"The Dream of Sunshine Academy" (The Sun Garden's Dream); Transliteration: "Ohisama-en no Yume" (Japanese: お日さま園の夢)	August 3, 2018	August 17, 2019
Hunter tries to get Xavier back on the field for training and the match, however, he is unsuccessful. Can he persuade Xavier to join the team again for the match against Raimon Eleven?
19	"The Ultimate Individual Tactic" (The Ultimate Personal Technique); Transliteration: "Kyūkyoku no Kojin-Gi" (Japanese: 究極の個人技)	August 10, 2018	August 24, 2019
As Xavier comes in during the match, he shows some great technique. However, all plays he makes are made by individual plays. Raimon Eleven can't keep up with these plays, and loses points.
20	"The Name of the New Secret Move" (The Ultimate Technique, Its Name Is...); Transliteration: "Hissatsu Ōgi, Sono Na Wa..." (Japanese: 必殺奥義、その名は...)	August 17, 2018	August 31, 2019
Even though Xavier and Hunter both entered the match, they still don't work together well. Can Xavier find out the meaning behind the Ultimate Technique?
21	"Scattered Eleven"; Transliteration: "Barabara no Irebun" (Japanese: バラバラのイレブン)	August 24, 2018	September 7, 2019
Due to the pressure of getting close to the final, the team is starting to fall apart. Maxime has to step in as captain, but fails to raise everyone's spirit. And to add to everyone's dismay Mister Yi also leave them and put Maxime in charge and left him a letter saying that they will not be able to win the next match and should console everyone when they lose and left another letter with a special move that he, Basil and Sonny should try.
22	"The Legendary Captain"; Transliteration: "Densetsu no Kyaputen" (Japanese: 伝説のキャプテン)	August 31, 2018	September 14, 2019
Mark Evans is the legendary captain of the former Raimon Eleven. When Maxime doubts his ability as a captain of the Raimon Eleven, Mark comforts him by telling Maxime to be his own kind of captain and continues playing the match with Raimon Eleven. Maxime raises the spirit of his team and as a result, the match gets intense.
23	"Surpassing the Legend!"; Transliteration: "Densetsu o Norikoero!" (Japanese: 伝説を乗り越えろ！)	September 7, 2018	September 21, 2019
The match against Raimond and Everytown junior high is at an almost end, the team managed to score a goal against the invisible goalkeeper Mark Evans' almost perfect Mega Majin and now they have to try to score another goal with Sonny, Basel and Maxine doing a move that they are not sure with, cause it is imperfect. Will they be able to beat Everytown junior high led by an invincible goalkeeper and legendary captain Mark Evans?
24	"Heath's Declaration" (Nosaka's Declaration of War)"Heath's declaration" Transliteration: "Nosaka no Sensen Fukoku" (Japanese: 野坂の宣戦布告)	September 14, 2018	September 28, 2019
Maxine is at the hospital because of the accident when doing their imperfect move against Mark Evans and can't play on the next game and put Sonny as a substitute captain but they need a new player and to Their shock they have found one but shocking news is that Elliot Ember is their new player. What! The moonlight emperor and captain of Lunar Prime Academy is at Raimon Eleven but what does he want and why is he giving the Raimon Eleven members the complete data of all the Lunar Prime Academy players. The following match everything will be clear.
25	"The Clash of Three" (Clashing Soccer!!); Transliteration: "Gekitotsu Suru Sakkā!!" (Japanese: 激突するサッカー！！)	September 21, 2018	October 5, 2019
The match between Raimon Eleven and Lunar Prime Academy has finally started. The final battle for both teams in the Football Frontier. Right at the start of the game, Lunar Prime Academy initiate their fiercest technique, Omega Maelstrom. However, because of their training, Raimon Eleven manage to withstand that blow. Elliot Ember and Heath Moore play ferocious against each other, with both of them suffering heavy blows. Which one of these great teams will finish up top in the end?
26	"Dash to the Top"; Transliteration: "Teppen e Dasshu!" (Japanese: てっぺんへダッシュ！)	September 28, 2018	October 12, 2019
The match between Raimon Eleven and Lunar Prime Academy is almost coming to an end with the score being tied 2-2. Both teams are using several techniques to get past their opponent or to try to score the winning goal for their team but they have yet to succeed in scoring the winning goal for their team. Which team will win this match and the Football Frontier?

== Home media ==
The first eight episodes were released on DVD in North America from NCircle Entertainment on February 4, 2020.

== See also ==
- Inazuma Eleven: Victory Road
