= Yuka Nishigaki =

Japanese voice actress

- 西墻 由香
- Born: Japan
- Occupation: Voice actress

Yuka Nishigaki (西墻 由香, Nishigaki Yuka; born September 3, 1982) is a Japanese voice actress from Tottori Prefecture. She is affiliated with Ken Production. Her husband is fellow voice actor Tsubasa Yonaga.

== Filmography ==
=== Animation ===
2004

- Sgt. Frog (Upperclassman)
- Samurai Champloo (Customer)

2005

- Peach Girl (Schoolgirl, entourage)

2006

- Fighting Beauty Wulong (Richin)
- NANA (Highschool girl)
- Sasami: Magical Girls Club (Toshihiko "Monta" Saruta)
- Ghost Slayers Ayashi (Youngster)

2007

- Deltora Quest (Pete)
- Romeo × Juliet (Woman in the city)
- Kaze no Stigma (Tooru)
- Neuro - Supernatural Detective (Entourage)
- Mobile Suit Gundam 00 (Diet Member, French Assembly Member, Young Setsuna)
- Ghost Hound (Female student)

2008

- Macross Frontier (Female student B)
- Allison & Lillia (First-year student, Matthew)
- To Love-Ru (Big beautiful sister)
- Nabari no Ou (Student)
- Monochrome Factor (Romeo Role)
- Uchi no 3 Shimai (Shōko, A-chan, Ta-kun)
- Clannad After Story (Older brother)
- Kannagi: Crazy Shrine Maidens (Kobu)
- Mobile Suit Gundam 00 Second Season (Young Setsuna)
- Inazuma Eleven (2008-2011) (Kazemaru Ichirouta, Terakawa Iwao, Tennouji Mari, Yakata Naoto, Kinki Nozomi, Holly Summers, Eric Purpleton, Azzurro Zaffire, Marco Maseratti, Shinti Hanpa)
- Stitch! (Koji)

2009

- Fullmetal Alchemist: Brotherhood (Boy)
- Shangri-La (Young Takehiko)
- Kanamemo (Old woman)
- A Certain Scientific Railgun (Boy)
- Shugo Chara! Party! (Boy)
- Stitch! Itazura Alien no Daibōken (Koji)
- InuYasha: The Final Act (Kai)
- Natsu no Arashi! Akinai-chū (Yamamoto)

2010

- The Qwaser of Stigmata (Usagi-chan)
- Beyblade: Metal Masters (Dusty)

2011

- Inazuma Eleven GO (Kazemaru Ichirouta, Yoshimine Misaki)
- No. 6 (Riko, Young Nezumi)
- Squid Girl (Shota Kuroishi)
- Chihayafuru (Male Elementary Schooler)
- Guilty Crown (Yuu)

2012

- Inazuma Eleven GO 2: Chrono Stone (Kazemaru Ichirouta)

2015

- Pocket Monsters: XY&Z (Nihei)

2016

- Beyblade Burst (Quon Kimidori)

2018

- Inazuma Eleven: Ares no Tenbin (2018 series) (Kazemaru Ichirouta)
- Inazuma Eleven: Orion no Kokuin (2018-2019) (Kazemaru Ichirouta)

=== Films ===
2007

- Nezumi Monogatari - George to Gerald no Bōken (Young Leopold)

2010

- Mobile Suit Gundam 00 the Movie: A Wakening of the Trailblazer

=== Video games ===
2008

- Class of Heroes (Female Advocate)

2009

- Inazuma Eleven 2 (Kazemaru Ichirouta)
- Final Fantasy XIII (Cocoon citizens)

2010

- Inazuma Eleven 3 (Kazemaru Ichirouta, Azzurro Zaffire)

2011

- Inazuma Eleven Strikers (Kazemaru Ichirouta, Doumen Shuuichirou, Kinki Nozomi)
- Inazuma Eleven GO (Kazemaru Ichirouta)
- Inazuma Eleven Strikers 2012 Xtreme (Kazemaru Ichirouta, Doumen Shuuichirou, Kinki Nozomi, Kiya Kouji)

2012

- Guilty Crown Lost Christmas (Yuu)
- Inazuma Eleven GO Strikers 2013 (Kazemaru Ichirouta, Doumen Shuuichirou, Kinki Nozomi, Kiya Kouji, Genius, Marco Maseratti, Shinti Hanpa

2017

- Yo-kai Watch: Wibble Wobble (Kazemaru Ichirouta)

2020

- Inazuma Eleven SD (Kazemaru Ichirouta)

2025

- Inazuma Eleven: Victory Road (Kazemaru Ichirouta)
