= Sasaki and Peeps =

Japanese light novel series

- First light novel volume cover, featuring (from left to right) Hoshizaki, Otonari, Peeps, Sasaki, Mueller, and Elsa

佐々木とピーちゃん (Sasaki to Pii-chan)
- Genre: Fantasy comedy; Isekai
- Novel series
- Written by: Buncololi
- Published by: Kakuyomu; Shōsetsuka ni Narō
- Original run: December 4, 2018 – present
- Light novel
- Written by: Buncololi
- Illustrated by: Kantoku
- Published by: Media Factory
- English publisher: NA: Yen Press
- Imprint: MF Bunko J
- Original run: January 25, 2021 – present
- Volumes: 13
- Manga
- Written by: Buncololi
- Illustrated by: Pureji Osho
- Published by: Kadokawa Shoten
- English publisher: NA: Yen Press
- Magazine: Shōnen Ace Plus
- Original run: January 22, 2021 – present
- Volumes: 5
- Anime television series
- Directed by: Mirai Minato (S1); Yūshi Ibe (S2)
- Produced by: Kousuke Arai; Akihiro Narita; Shuka Nishimae; Yukari Kuwayama; Shunichi Uemura; Shun Oorui (S1); Kenichi Tokumura (S1); Hayato Kaneko (S1); Yasusuke Nagami (S2)
- Written by: Deko Akao
- Music by: Nippon Columbia
- Studio: Silver Link
- Licensed by: Crunchyroll (streaming); SA/SEA: Muse Communication
- Original network: AT-X, Tokyo MX, SUN, BS NTV, KBS Kyoto
- Original run: January 5, 2024 – present
- Episodes: 18
- icon

Sasaki and Peeps (佐々木とピーちゃん, Sasaki to Pii-chan) is a Japanese light novel series written by Buncololi and illustrated by Kantoku. The series originally began serialization as a web novel on the novel posting websites Kakuyomu and Shōsetsuka ni Narō in December 2018, before beginning publication under Media Factory's MF Bunko J imprint in January 2021. A manga adaptation illustrated by Pureji Osho began serialization in Kadokawa Shoten's Shōnen Ace Plus online magazine in January 2021, and has been compiled in four tankōbon volumes as of July 2024. Both the light novel and manga are licensed in English by Yen Press. An anime television series adaptation produced by Silver Link aired from January to March 2024. A second season premiered in October 2026.

== Plot ==
Sasaki is a middle-aged salaryman going through his mundane days, one after another. After seeing a coworker's cat pics, he is inspired to adopt a pet, hoping to give his empty days some spark of joy. While perusing the varied animals wanting a home, he comes across a small bird with a star on its chest. Feeling a connection, he takes his new friend home only to discover the tiny bird to be Piercarlo, the reincarnated Star Sage from a parallel world. Upon further discussion, Sasaki gives Piercarlo the name Peeps and they form a pact agreeing to live and work together. Their adventures begin as they explore both worlds, with Sasaki attempting to master the magic Peeps bestowed upon him. Soon enough, events get more intense as, in the modern world, Sasaki becomes involved with an organization of psychics (modern-day magic users) trying to protect civilians from a wild faction of "Irregulars", while in the parallel world, a war threatens to overtake the country he has become fond of. One thing leads to another, and Sasaki finds his once simple life becoming crazier and crazier with every passing day.

== Characters ==
=== Main characters ===
Sasaki (佐々木)
Voiced by: Tomokazu Sugita (Japanese); Tyson Rinehart (English)
A middle-aged salaryman who, with the help of a bird named Peeps, is able to travel between the real world and another world. He originally bought Peeps due to being bored with his life as a salaryman, unaware of his magical origins.
Peeps (ピーちゃん, Pii-chan)
Voiced by: Aoi Yūki (Japanese); Erin Nicole Lundquist (English)
A small gray Java sparrow that accompanies Sasaki and has the ability to transport Sasaki between worlds. He is also the reincarnation of the great Star Sage and is responsible for teaching Sasaki magic. His original name was Piercarlo.

=== Otherworld Faction ===
Viscount Mueller (ミュラー, Myurā)
Voiced by: Hiroki Yasumoto (Japanese); Ray Hurd (English)
He is the lord of the area that Sasaki finds himself in first on his adventures in the parallel world. He was fond of the sage Piercarlo, who was later reincarnated as Peeps.
Elsa (エルザ, Eruza)
Voiced by: Miyu Tomita (Japanese); Lisette Monique Diaz (English)
The daughter of Viscount Mueller. Due to danger in the other world, she later goes to Japan. While in the real world she uses Sasaki to serve as her interpreter, although she later gets translator earphones.
Prince Adonis (アドニス, Adonisu)
Voiced by: Jun Fukuyama (Japanese); Charles Nguyen (English)
Marc (マルク, Maruku)
Voiced by: Mitsuo Iwata (Japanese); Eli Farmer (English)
The vice-manager of the trading company and a person that Sasaki regularly does business with.
French (フレンチ, Furenchi)
Voiced by: Daisuke Namikawa (Japanese); Davon Oliver (English)
An apprentice chef who was fired for unjust reasons. He is then picked up by Sasaki and runs the day-to-day business of the restaurant Sasaki opens.
Josef (ヨーゼフ, Yōzefu)
Voiced by: Hikaru Midorikawa
The owner of a foreign trading company which holds a large amount of influence and power.
Maximillian (マクシミリアン, Makushimirian)
Voiced by: Daisuke Kishio
Kai (カイ)
Voiced by: Gakuto Kajiwara
Sebastian (セバスチャン, Sebasuchan)
Voiced by: Tesshō Genda

=== Modern Psychics Faction ===
Akutsu (阿久津)
Voiced by: Ryōtarō Okiayu
He is one of the higher-ups in the psychic organization, and Sasaki's boss. Later, Hoshizaki finds out he is gay.
Hoshizaki-san (星崎さん)
Voiced by: Rie Takahashi (Japanese); Julie Cleburn (English)
A high school student who is often seen wearing business attire in an attempt to appear more mature. When she has the appearance of a high school girl she has braided hair and wears glasses. She has the ability to control liquids.
Shizuka Futari (二人 静, Futari Shizuka)
Voiced by: Naomi Ōzora (Japanese); Robin Clayton (English)
She is an A-ranked psychic who can drain the life force of those she touches. She also has very strong regenerative abilities making her near-immortal. It is suggested by Akutsu that she may be over 300 years old. Originally a member of an evil psychic organization, she eventually becomes a very strong asset and close friend to Sasaki.

=== Magical Girl Faction ===
Magical Pink (マジカルピンク, Majikaru Pinku)
Voiced by: Inori Minase (Japanese); Jennifer AuBuchon (English)
Not much is known about her, but she was bestowed magical powers by a fairy who she then killed, some time after her parents were killed by psychics. These events have led her to hate all psychics, driving her to kill every psychic she finds.

=== Death Game Faction ===
Otonari-san (お隣さん)
Voiced by: Akari Kitō (Japanese); Taylor Murphy (English)
A junior high school student who lives next door to Sasaki. She seems to have developed feelings for him. Although her full name is not stated in the series, her surname is stated to be Kurosu (黒須).

== Media ==
=== Light novel ===
No.	Title	Original release date	English release date
1	That Time I Got Dragged into a Psychic Battle in Modern Times While Trying to Enjoy a Relaxing Life in Another World ~Looks Like Magical Girls Are On Deck~ 異世界でスローライフを楽しもうとしたら、現代で異能バトルに巻き込まれた件 〜魔法少女がアップを始めたようです〜	January 25, 2021; 978-4-04-065932-9	August 16, 2022; 978-1-9753-4352-1
2	While I Was Dominating Modern Psychic Battles with Spells from Another World, a Magical Girl Picked a Fight with Me ~You Mean I Have to Participate in a Death Game, Too?~ 異世界の魔法で現代の異能バトルを無双していたら、魔法少女に喧嘩を売られました ～まさかデスゲームにも参戦するのですか？〜	March 25, 2021; 978-4-04-065933-6	October 11, 2022; 978-1-9753-4354-5
3	Psychic Battles, Magical Girls, and Death Games Can’t Contend with Otherworldly Fantasy ~Or So I Thought, but Now a Storm Is Brewing~ 異世界ファンタジーなら異能バトルも魔法少女もデスゲームも敵ではありません ～と考えていたら、雲行きが怪しくなってきました～	May 25, 2021; 978-4-04-065934-3	January 17, 2023; 978-1-9753-4538-9
4	The Psychics and the Magical Girl Drag the Death Game Crew into the Fight ~Alert! Giant Sea Monster Approaching Japan~ 異能力者と魔法少女がデスゲーム勢を巻き込んで喧嘩を始めました ～並びに巨大怪獣が日本来訪のお知らせ～	November 25, 2021; 978-4-04-680915-5	May 23, 2023; 978-1-9753-5167-0
5	Betrayals, Conspiracies, and Coups d'État! The Gripping Conclusion to the Otherworld Succession Battle ~Meanwhile, You Asked for It! It’s Time for a Slice-Of-Life Episode in Modern Japan, but We Appear to Be on Hard Mode~ 裏切り、謀略、クーデター！ 異世界では王家の跡目争いが大決着 ～現代は待望の日常回、ただし、ハードモードの模様〜	May 25, 2022; 978-4-04-681406-7	October 17, 2023; 978-1-9753-6790-9
6	An Unidentified Flying Object from Outer Space Arrives and Earth Is Under Attack! ~The Extraterrestrial Lifeform That Came to Announce Mankind’s End Appears to Be Dangerously Sensitive~ 宇宙の彼方より、未確認飛行物体、来襲！ ～人類終了のお知らせ、伝えに訪れた地球外生命体は、どうやら地雷のようです〜	November 25, 2022; 978-4-04-682034-1	March 19, 2024; 978-1-9753-7840-0
7	Fake Family Formed! ~The Youngest Daughter Dreams of a Warm Family in This Hodgepodge Household~ 疑似家族、結成！ ～温かな家庭を夢見る末娘と、てんでバラバラな家人たち～	May 25, 2023; 978-4-04-682035-8	July 23, 2024; 978-1-9753-9272-7
8	The Gang Heads to School and Ends Up in a Friendly Little Romcom ~Who Will Get Their Hands on True Love?~ 巡り巡って舞台は学校、みんなで仲良くラブコメ回 ～真実の愛を手にするのは誰だ？～	January 25, 2024; 978-4-04-682036-5	January 21, 2025; 979-8-8554-0841-6
9	A View-Count War Breaks Out on Social Media! ~My Neighbor’s Explosive VTuber Debut~ 動画投稿サイトでPVバトル勃発! ~お隣さんがVTuberとして成り上がっていくようです~	July 25, 2024; 978-4-04-683798-1	October 21, 2025; 979-8-8554-1831-6
10	Assigned Overseas! Poached! Hired on the Spot! ~That Time the Corporate Drone Who Couldn't Speak English Was Sent to a Foreign Country and Taken In by the Mafia~ 海外赴任！ 引き抜き！ 現地雇用！ ～英語が喋れない社畜が国外に飛ばされたら、マフィアに採用されていた件～	January 24, 2025; 978-4-04-684449-1	August 11, 2026; 979-8-8554-2430-0
11	Time for a Big Adventure! I Start Clearing a Dungeon in the Otherworld ~Ruins of Ancient Civilization Unearthed at Construction Site~ 大冒険！ 異世界でダンジョン攻略、はじめました ～工事現場から太古に滅亡した文明の遺跡が出土しまして～	June 25, 2025; 978-4-04-684886-4	April 13, 2027; 979-8-8554-4673-9
12	妖精界からの落とし物は、変態！ 変態！ 大変態！ ～長きにわたるアップの末、魔法少女たちが活動を開始するようです～	November 25, 2025; 978-4-04-685290-8	—
13	異世界の大帝国に忍び込んだ女児が、イケオジ軍団を踏み台にして権謀術数 ～王宮侍女モノ、逆ハー溺愛ファンタジーＲＴＡ！～	March 25, 2026; 978-4-04-685826-9	—
14	宇宙の彼方から機械生命体の調査隊が飛来！ ～人類総出で終末の試験期間、異能力者も魔法少女も天使と悪魔とその使徒も～	October 23, 2026; 978-4-04-660640-2	—

=== Manga ===
No.	Original release date	Original ISBN	English release date	English ISBN
1	June 25, 2021	978-4-04-065932-9	October 18, 2022	978-1-9753-4884-7
2	June 24, 2022	978-4-04-112119-1	May 23, 2023	978-1-9753-6638-4
3	August 25, 2023	978-4-04-114121-2	January 21, 2025	979-8-8554-0031-1
4	July 25, 2024	978-4-04-114892-1	December 30, 2025	979-8-8554-1925-2
5	June 25, 2025	978-4-04-115960-6	October 27, 2026	979-8-8554-3372-2
6	June 26, 2026	978-4-04-117475-3	—	—

=== Anime ===
An anime television series adaptation was announced during the "Natsu no Gakuensai 2022" event for MF Bunko J on July 24, 2022. It is produced by Silver Link and directed by Mirai Minato, with scripts written by Deko Akao, and character designs handled by Saori Nakashiki. The series aired from January 5 to March 22, 2024, on AT-X and other networks. The opening theme song is "Fly", performed by Madkid, while the ending theme song is "Aimai Girl" (曖昧ガール; "Ambiguous Girl"), performed by Aguri Ōnishi. Crunchyroll streamed the series. Muse Communication licensed the series in South and Southeast Asia.

A second season was announced at the AnimeJapan 2024 event on March 24, 2024. The staff and cast members from the first season are reprising their roles, with Yūshi Ibe replacing Minato as director. The season premiered on October 7, 2026. The opening theme song is "Unbroken", performed by Madkid,while the ending theme song is The opening theme song is "Fly", performed by Madkid, while the ending theme song is "Sukipi no Okage!" (すきぴのおかげ！; "All thanks to my crush!"), performed by Nonfic!.

==== Episodes ====
===== Season 1 (2024) =====
No. overall	No. in season	Title (Note: All English titles are taken from Crunchyroll.)	Directed by (Note: Information is taken from the ending credits of each episode.)	Written by	Storyboarded by	Original release date
1	1	"Real Life and Fantasy"; Transliteration: "Gendai to Isekai" (Japanese: 現代と異世界)	Mirao Minato, Yamato Oouchi, Haruka Hirota, Yuushi Ibe	Deko Akao	Mirai Minato, Mina Okita	January 5, 2024 (Note: Premiered as a 1-hour special.)
Sasaki, a middle-aged office worker, buys a pet Java sparrow. To his surprise, the sparrow, who he names "Peeps", turns out to be a reincarnation of a Star sage from another world. Peeps teaches Sasaki magic, and shows him how to transport to Peeps's world and back. The two decide to start an interdimensional trading business, selling goods from Earth in Peeps's world. Later, Sasaki finds a young woman getting attacked by a man with superpowers. Sasaki saves her with his ice magic, causing the woman to mistake him for a psychic and take him in for questioning. The woman, Hoshizaki, brings him into the Paranormal Phenomena Countermeasure Bureau, a secret organization that polices psychics. Hoshizaki conscripts Sasaki into working for the Bureau. Back home, Otonari, Sasaki's neighbor, gives him cookies and starts asking about Hoshizaki. Later, Peeps tells Sasaki that somebody planted a hidden camera in his apartment. After removing it and complaining to his new boss at the Bureau, Sasaki starts to wonder about the new direction his life is taking.
2	2	"A First Job and a Partner"; Transliteration: "Hatsu Shigoto to Pātonā" (Japanese: 初仕事とパートナー)	Yuushi Ibe	Deko Akao	Mina Okita	January 12, 2024
Sasaki's first job with the Bureau sends him and Hoshizaki to arrest a group of rogue psychics. They encounter a powerful psychic woman, Futari Shizuka. Later, Sasaki finds a magical girl.
3	3	"The War and the Young Lady"; Transliteration: "Ikusa to Ojōsama" (Japanese: 戦(いくさ)とお嬢様)	Naoki Hishikawa	Deko Akao	Koji Sawai	January 19, 2024
With war brewing in the other world, Viscount Müller asks Sasaki for supplies for the kingdom.
4	4	"The Prince and the Sage"; Transliteration: "Oji to Kenja" (Japanese: 王子と賢者)	Haruka Hirota	Akihisa Nishikubo	Gouichi Iwahata	January 26, 2024
The war in the other world heats up as Sasaki and Peeps try to save the kingdom.
5	5	"A Magical Man and a Third World"; Transliteration: "Mahō Chūnen to Mittsume no Sekai" (Japanese: 魔法中年と三つ目の世界)	Naoki Hishikawa	Deko Akao	Akira Nishimori	February 2, 2024
Back on Earth, Sasaki and Hoshizaki are tasked with recruiting a young psychic, leading to an encounter with the magical girl, Magical Pink.
6	6	"Interview and Wine and Dine"; Transliteration: "Mendan to Settai" (Japanese: 面談と接待)	Mika Inoue	Deko Akao	Namako Umino	February 9, 2024
Sasaki tries to talk Futari Shizuka into joining the Bureau.
7	7	"Martial and Political Force"; Transliteration: "Buryoku to Seijiryoku" (Japanese: 武力と政治力)	Ryuuta Yamamoto	Nanami Hoshino	Koji Sawai	February 16, 2024
Sasaki deals with political intrigue in the other world.
8	8	"Suspicions and Sightseeing"; Transliteration: "Ginen to Kankō" (Japanese: 疑念と観光)	Yamato Oouchi	Nanami Hoshino	Hiromitsu Kanazawa	February 23, 2024
When Lady Elsa crosses over to Earth, Sasaki and Peeps have to look after her.
9	9	"Executions and Negotiations"; Transliteration: "Shokei to Kōshō" (Japanese: 処刑と交渉)	Naoki Hisikawa	Akihisa Nishikubo	Namako Umino	March 1, 2024
In the other world, Sasaki tries to save an innocent man from prison.
10	10	"Value and Dignity"; Transliteration: "Kachi to Songen" (Japanese: 価値と尊厳)	Hiroshi Maejima	Akihisa Nishikubo	Seiji Okuda	March 8, 2024
As Marc's execution draws near, Sasaki works to save him.
11	11	"Imagination and Counters"; Transliteration: "Mōsō to Kōryaku" (Japanese: 妄想と攻略)	Naoki Hishikawa	Deko Akao	Hideyo Yamamoto	March 15, 2024
When Shizuka's old organization puts a hit out on her, Sasaki and Peeps step in to protect her.
12	12	"Real Life, Fantasy, and the Fourth World"; Transliteration: "Gendai to Isekai to Yottsume no Sekai" (Japanese: 現代と異世界と四つ目の世界)	Yamato Oouchi	Deko Akao	Shinichi Watanabe	March 22, 2024
When Magical Pink and another magical girl attack the Bureau, it's up to Sasaki and Shizuka to save them.

===== Season 2 (2026) =====
No. overall	No. in season	Title	Directed by	Written by	Storyboarded by	Original release date
13	1	"Mother and Child"; Transliteration: "Haha to Ko" (Japanese: 母と子)	Unknown	Unknown	TBA	October 7, 2026
14	2	"Death Games and Demons"; Transliteration: "Desugēmu to Akuma" (Japanese: デスゲームと悪魔)	Unknown	Unknown	TBA	October 14, 2026
15	3	"Concealment and Infiltration"; Transliteration: "Senpuku to Sen'nyū" (Japanese: 潜伏と潜入)	Unknown	Unknown	TBA	October 21, 2026
16	4	"Angel and Boy"; Transliteration: "Tenshi to Shōne" (Japanese: 天使と少年)	TBA	TBA	TBA	October 28, 2026
17	5	"Heroes and Feelings"; Transliteration: "Hīrō to Omoi" (Japanese: 英雄(ヒーロー)と想い)	TBA	TBA	TBA	November 4, 2026
18	6	"Feast and Bonds"; Transliteration: "Utage to En" (Japanese: 宴と縁)	TBA	TBA	TBA	November 11, 2026
19	7	"Cultural Exchanges and Female Leads"; Transliteration: "Ibunka Kōryū to Hiroin" (Japanese: 異文化交流とヒロイン)	TBA	TBA	TBA	November 18, 2026

== Reception ==
In the 2022 edition of Kono Light Novel ga Sugoi!, the series ranked first in the tankōbon and novel categories.

== See also ==
- Nishino, another light novel series written by Buncololi
