= How I Attended an All-Guy's Mixer =

Japanese manga series

- First tankōbon volume cover, featuring Fuji (bottom), Suou (middle), and Kohaku (top)

合コンに行ったら女がいなかった話 (Gōkon ni Ittara Onna ga Inakatta Hanashi)
- Genre: Romantic comedy
- Manga
- Written by: Nana Aokawa
- Published by: Square Enix
- English publisher: NA: Square Enix (digital) Tokyopop
- Imprint: Gangan Comics Online
- Magazine: Gangan Online; (February 12, 2021 – present)
- Original run: March 21, 2020 – present
- Volumes: 11
- Television drama
- Directed by: Satoshi Takemoto; Akimori Sakami; Masaki Ogata
- Written by: Deko Akao; Shinya Hokimoto
- Music by: Takatsugu Wakabayashi
- Studio: Kansai TV
- Original network: Kansai TV, Tokyo MX
- Original run: October 21, 2022 – December 23, 2022
- Episodes: 12
- Anime television series
- Directed by: Kazuomi Koga
- Written by: Deko Akao
- Music by: Technoboys Pulcraft Green-Fund
- Studio: Ashi Productions
- Licensed by: Sentai Filmworks: SEA: Medialink
- Original network: Tokyo MX, BS Nittere, Kansai TV, AT-X
- Original run: October 5, 2024 – December 21, 2024
- Episodes: 12
- icon

How I Attended an All-Guy's Mixer (Japanese: 合コンに行ったら女がいなかった話, Hepburn: Gōkon ni Ittara Onna ga Inakatta Hanashi) is a Japanese manga series written and illustrated by Nana Aokawa. It began serialization on the author's Pixiv account in March 2020. It was later acquired by Square Enix who began publishing it on their Gangan Online manga website in February 2021. A live-action television drama adaptation aired from October to December 2022. An anime television series adaptation produced by Ashi Productions aired from October to December 2024.

== Plot ==
College student Tokiwa gets invited to a mixer (合コン gōkon) by his female classmate Suou, and is able to bring along two other friends as Suou will be accompanied with two of her coworkers. By the time he arrives at the meet up spot with his friends Asagi and Hagi, they are confused and flustered to be greeted by not three cute women but instead three women who are dressed as dazzlingly handsome men.

== Characters ==
Suou (蘇芳, Suō)
Voiced by: Mikako Komatsu (PV, anime) (Japanese); Jade Kelly (English)
Portrayed by: Hiroki Nanami
The main female protagonist. She attends the same university as Tokiwa and was the one who invited him to a mixer between his friends and her colleagues. She works part-time at a cross-dressing bar and keeps up a prince-like persona towards patrons; she keeps a low profile on campus while maintaining her bar appearance, leading other students to mistake her for a man and dub her as the "SSR Prince" (SSRのプリンス, SSR no Purinsu).
Tokiwa (常盤)
Voiced by: Yoshiki Nakajima (PV), Shunsuke Takeuchi (anime) (Japanese); Jeremy Gee (English)
Portrayed by: Sora Inoue
The main male protagonist and Suou's partner. He attends the same university as Suou but was not close with her prior to the mixer, and is friends with Asagi and Hagi. He was invited by Suou to attend a mixer with his friends, where he learns of Suou's second profession. He sometimes gets flustered by the actions of Suou and her colleagues.
Fuji (藤)
Voiced by: Aoi Yūki (Japanese); Katelyn Barr (English)
Portrayed by: Kazuya Seto
A colleague of Suou at the bar who is shown to be always stoic and aloof, taking up a lazy persona during work. She also takes up drawing manga, especially erotic boys' love manga, as a hobby.
Asagi (浅葱)
Voiced by: Shun Horie (Japanese); Bryson Baugus (English)
Portrayed by: Eito Konishi
A university friend of Tokiwa and Fuji's partner who is usually ditzy but shows an eagerness to partake in activities and accept requests, much to the worry of his friends.
Kohaku (琥珀)
Voiced by: Nao Tōyama (Japanese); Annie Wild (English)
Portrayed by: Ren Kisaragi
Another colleague of Suou at the bar who is shown to be serious and usually acts as the straight man between the antics of Suou and Fuji. She takes up a bossy persona during work, which she aims to improve on.
Hagi (萩)
Voiced by: Gakuto Kajiwara (Japanese); Benjamin McLaughlin (English)
Portrayed by: Atsuki Mashiko
Another university friend of Tokiwa and Kohaku's partner, who is nervous and tends to easily panic. He has a bias for cute girls and is left confused whenever he feels attracted towards the cool and handsome Kohaku, questioning his sexuality during these occasions.
Nadeshiko (撫子)
Voiced by: Reina Kondō (Japanese); Genevieve Simmons (English)
A university classmate of Tokiwa and friend of Chigusa who is a big fan of Suou's SSR Prince persona and expresses jealousy towards Tokiwa's closeness with Suou.
Chigusa (千草)
Voiced by: Tomoyo Takayanagi (Japanese); Juliet Simmons (English)
Another university classmate of Tokiwa and friend of Nadeshiko who is a big fan of Suou's SSR Prince persona and expresses jealousy towards Tokiwa's closeness with Suou.
Karasuba (烏羽)
Voiced by: Maki Kawase
Another colleague of Suou at the bar who takes up a playboy persona during work.
Hashibami (榛)
Voiced by: Yoshino Aoyama (Japanese); Amanda Martinez (English)
Another colleague of Suou at the bar who takes up an older brother persona during work.
Hagi's older sister (萩の姉, Hagi no Ane)
Voiced by: Shizuka Itō

== Media ==
=== Manga ===
Written and illustrated by Nana Aokawa, How I Attended an All-Guys Mixer began serialization on the author's Pixiv account on March 21, 2020. It was later acquired by Square Enix who began to publish it on their Gangan Online manga website on February 12, 2021. Its chapters have been compiled into twelve tankōbon volumes as of October 2026.

The manga is published in English on Square Enix's Manga UP! app. During its panel at Anime Expo 2026, Tokyopop announced that it had licensed the series for English publication in a 2-in-1 omnibus format.

==== Volumes ====
No.	Release date	ISBN
1	February 12, 2021	978-4-7575-7096-2
Chapters 1–8
2	September 10, 2021	978-4-7575-7476-2
Chapters 9–14.5
3	April 12, 2022	978-4-7575-7770-1
Chapters 15–21.5
4	October 12, 2022	978-4-7575-8203-3
Chapters 22–28
5	April 12, 2023	978-4-7575-8523-2
Chapters 29–34.5
6	October 12, 2023	978-4-7575-8852-3
Chapters 35–40
7	April 12, 2024	978-4-7575-9151-6
Chapters 41–46
8	September 12, 2024	978-4-7575-9418-0
Chapters 47–52
9	April 12, 2025	978-4-7575-9794-5
Chapters 53–57.5
10	October 10, 2025	978-4-301-00117-1
Chapters 58–62.7
11	April 11, 2026	978-4-301-00456-1
Chapters 63–68
12	October 9, 2026	978-4-301-00815-6

=== Drama ===
A live-action television drama was announced on September 2, 2022. It aired from October 21, 2022, to December 23, 2022, on Kansai TV's EDGE programming block.

=== Anime ===
An anime television series adaptation was announced on October 5, 2023. The series is produced by Ashi Productions and directed by Kazuomi Koga, with Deko Akao handling series scripts, Yōko Tanabe designing the characters, and Technoboys Pulcraft Green-Fund composing the music. The series aired from October 5 to December 21, 2024, on Tokyo MX and other networks. (Note: Tokyo MX lists the series premiere on October 4, 2024, at 25:30, which is effectively October 5 at 1:30 a.m. JST.) The opening theme is "Merry Go Round Time" (メリーゴーランドタイム) performed by Nasuo, while the ending theme is "Osama Dāreda" (王様だーれだっ, "Crown Game") performed by Asobi Doumei. Sentai Filmworks licensed the series in North America, Australia and British Isles for streaming on Hidive. Medialink licensed the series in Southeast Asia for streaming on Ani-One Asia's YouTube channel.

==== Episodes ====
No.	Title	Directed by	Written by	Storyboarded by	Original release date (Note: Episodes are released on ABEMA 5 days before their televised airings.)
1	"That Time I Went to a Mixer and..." Transliteration: "Gōkon ni Ittara Batsubatsu Datta Hanashi" (Japanese: 合コンに行ったら××だった話)	Kazuomi Koga	Deko Akao	Kazuomi Koga	October 5, 2024
A trio of friends—Tokiwa, Asagi, and Hagi—are invited to a mixer by Tokiwa's classmate Suou under the assumption of meeting women until they notice their partners are men. Tokiwa calls Suou to clarify the confusion when Suou introduces herself to them, revealing the men they are meeting are cross-dressers consisting of Suou, Kohaku, and Fuji. Suou holds an icebreaker for her group and Tokiwa's group to be more acquainted with each other, despite the wariness of Tokiwa and his friends. As the evening continues, the group slowly warms up to one another, with Asagi and Hagi becoming partners with Fuji and Kohaku respectively. The next day, Suou expresses her gratitude to Tokiwa during a university class for attending the mixer. Tokiwa learns from his classmates Nadeshiko and Chigusa of Suou's mystique and popularity on campus and show their jealousy of him being able to casually talk to her before he is pulled away by Suou, remarking she and Tokiwa are friends. She begins to take a liking towards Tokiwa as she sets her picture with him as her phone screen.
2	"That Time I Went to a Bar and..." Transliteration: "Bar ni Ittara Batsubatsu Datta Hanashi" (Japanese: BARに行ったら××だった話)	Michita Shiraishi	Kenichi Yamashita	Masayoshi Nishida	October 12, 2024
Asagi is invited to a hangout by Fuji. Worried he might be manipulated, Tokiwa and Hagi spy on them, where they see Fuji use Asagi as a model for hand poses on a manga she is working on. Hagi grows jealous towards Tokiwa and Asagi's interactions with Suou and Fuji and wonders when he will spend time with Kohaku. He crosses paths with her during a rainy day and grows flustered in seeing Kohaku's cuteness as he lends her his jacket and takes her to the cross-dressing bar she works in, leaving ahead of her. A few days later, Suou invites Tokiwa and Asagi to the bar and Tokiwa is overwhelmed by the number of cross-dressing bartenders catering to them. Kohaku, putting up a bossy persona, notices Hagi is absent and requests the two to let Hagi know she will repay him. After work, Kohaku aims to improve her persona as she messages Hagi on wanting to meet up.
3	"That Time I Went to an Izakaya and..." Transliteration: "Izakaya ni Ittara Batsubatsu Datta Hanashi" (Japanese: 居酒屋に行ったら××だった話)	Fumio Maezono	Deko Akao	Masayoshi Nishida	October 19, 2024
Hagi meets with Kohaku at a cafe and is initially nervous due to thinking he angered her, though the misunderstanding is cleared up when Kohaku returns Hagi's jacket, and they eat parfaits. Meanwhile, Asagi assists an exhausted Fuji in finishing her manga draft as Fuji prevents him from discovering he is assisting on an erotic manga; Asagi tends to Fuji's health after accomplishing the task. In university, Tokiwa meets with Suou to help him finish his activity by copying her work, where he finds Suou outside her work clothes and is left flustered with her feminine look. They later head to an izakaya to celebrate, and Suou allows a drunk Tokiwa to rest and sleep on her lap as she shares her first kiss with him, much to the bewilderment of Nadeshiko and Chigusa who are also in the izakaya and were under the impression they were friends. Sometime later, Tokiwa and his friends meet up when he and Hagi witness to their horror Asagi being kidnapped in front of them.
4	"That Time I Went to the Zoo and..." Transliteration: "Dōbutsuen ni Ittara Batsubatsu Datta Hanashi" (Japanese: 動物園に行ったら××だった話)	Fumihiro Ueno	Kenichi Yamashita	Ichizō Kobayashi	October 26, 2024
In a flashback, the boys discuss their recent activities with their partners as Suou approaches them and offers an outing in the weekend. Back in the present, the boys are relieved that the kidnapping is only Suou and her colleagues fetching them and they head for a zoo to see a panda exhibit. Suou and Fuji split up with their respective partners, much to Kohaku and Hagi's annoyance. The two decide to visit a guinea pig exhibit, where Hagi is left overwhelmed with Kohaku's cuteness in petting the guinea pigs. Meanwhile, a frightened Asagi accompanies Fuji in checking an insect exhibit as Fuji teases him. Elsewhere, Suou and Tokiwa plan to return to the group to see the panda, though they are forced to cancel their plans as they take care of a lost child. Seeing Suou disappointed that her plan did not pan out, Tokiwa makes up to her by gifting her a panda-and-tiger keychain, and Suou comes to appreciate his gift by proudly showcasing it. After the trip, Fuji invites Asagi to an outing.
5	"That Time I Went to the Comic Convention and..." Transliteration: "Komike ni Ittara Batsubatsu Datta Hanashi" (Japanese: コミケに行ったら××だった話)	Yoshihisa Matsumoto	Deko Akao	Yoshihisa Matsumoto	November 2, 2024
Asagi arrives at the comic convention and is left in awe with the activity during the event. Fuji finds Asagi and puts him on a leash to prevent him from separating, shocking female attendants. Fuji leaves Asagi to handle her stall while she picks up an item; Asagi learns how popular Fuji's manga is with visitors. As the event concludes, Asagi and Fuji eat dinner to celebrate their success. The next day, Suou visits Fuji's apartment to pick up Fuji and is surprised on seeing Asagi with her. When Suou asks Fuji what happened, Fuji explains she secretly took photos of a sleeping Asagi after dinner for pose references, much to his embarrassment. Fuji also tells him to accompany her at the bar as they eat, which Suou uses as an opportunity to invite Tokiwa. Tokiwa notices the doll Suou is holding resembles him, and he is left unnerved with Suou's intention for the doll.
6	"That Time I Went to Your Place and..." Transliteration: "Ouchi ni Ittara Batsubatsu Datta Hanashi" (Japanese: おうちに行ったら××だった話)	Kazuomi Koga	Kenichi Yamashita	Masayoshi Nishida	November 9, 2024
Hagi asks Tokiwa if he has ever had feelings for Suou due to Hagi harboring conflicting feelings for Kohaku, leading Asagi to suggest on visiting the bar for Hagi to know what he feels; his hunch is proven after he is charmed by Kohaku, though Hagi brushes it off. A week after the visit, Hagi admits being in love with Kohaku, but fears he has not spent enough time with her. Asagi brings him to consult with Fuji, but her advice does not help Hagi. As he heads home, Kohaku catches up to him and invites him out, surprising Hagi. He delightfully shares the news to Tokiwa and Asagi; however Kohaki cancels the outing, and Hagi becomes depressed, which worries Kohaku. As Hagi sulks in sorrow while being comforted by his older sister, Tokiwa and Suou get Kohaku to visit him and apologize. Hagi accepts her apology, but Kohaku runs off after seeing and mistaking his older sister as his girlfriend, much to Hagi's despair. Witnessing this, Tokiwa and Suou devise a plan to fix the misunderstanding.
7	"That Time I Went Camping and..." Transliteration: "Kyanpu ni Ittara Batsubatsu Datta Hanashi" (Japanese: キャンプに行ったら××だった話)	Norihiko Nagahama	Deko Akao	Masayoshi Nishida	November 16, 2024
As Tokiwa and Suou continue to think, they enter a mall and pass by a display for a camping set, giving Suou the idea to invite everyone, including a sullen Hagi, for camping. Hagi and Kohaku hesitate to talk to each other while the group sets up the campsite. Hagi clears up the misunderstanding of the previous day, leaving Kohaku relieved and they converse again. Fuji brings up to Suou on how she has not been able to charm Tokiwa, leading Suou to express on taking it slowly. As the group cleans up for the night, Suou and Tokiwa stargaze at the sky and engage in friendly banter. Suou attempts to charm Tokiwa but is stopped as the group returns. Later by the early morning, Kohaku joins a sleepless Hagi and shares on enjoying her time camping; soothed by her voice, Hagi sleeps by her side, taking her by surprise.
8	"That Time I Went to Campus and..." Transliteration: "Kyanpasu ni Ittara Batsubatsu Datta Hanashi" (Japanese: キャンパスに行ったら××だった話)	Michita Shiraishi	Kenichi Yamashita	Fumikazu Sato	November 23, 2024
Nadeshiko and Chigusa spy on Tokiwa and Suou bonding and suspect Tokiwa is caught in a love triangle between Suou's Prince and off-duty personae. The two later confront Tokiwa on the issue when Suou defuses the situation by giving the cover story that her off-duty persona is her Prince persona's younger sister. Meanwhile, Asagi drinks at the bar and spills his drink on his shirt, leaving Fuji to make him temporarily wear the bartender's uniform; a patron visits the bar and mistakes Asagi as being part of the staff. Fuji later teaches him how to use a cocktail shaker after she sees Asagi's interest. Elsewhere, Hagi accompanies his drunk sister as the sister points out she can tell Hagi has a crush on Kohaku, much to his shock. As Hagi pays the bill, his sister wanders off and meets Kohaku; the two talk about Hagi, and his sister shares his preference for cute girls and how he is a reliable person before Hagi fetches her. Kohaku, now made aware of Hagi's preferences, looks at her reflection.
9	"That Time I Went to a Summer Festival and..." Transliteration: "Natsumatsuri ni Ittara Batsubatsu Datta Hanashi" (Japanese: 夏祭りに行ったら××だった話)	Yoshihisa Matsumoto & Masato Uchibori	Kenichi Yamashita	Yoshihisa Matsumoto	November 30, 2024
After learning from Asagi of a card where he can avail for a photo with a bartender upon earning enough stamps, Hagi gets his own from Fuji. Hagi thinks on how he can earn stamps when he is reminded that he has not spent enough time bonding with Kohaku, prompting him to ask her out to a summer festival. While Suou and Fuji join the festival with their partners to spy on them, Hagi meets with Kohaku, where he is taken by surprise by her feminine appearance. As they bond, Hagi realizes he has gotten used to her handsome appearance and is unable to focus on the feminine Kohaku. Despite this, he asks Kohaku if she is open to hanging out again, which Kohaku agrees. The next day, Tokiwa and Asagi visit the bar, which has taken up a summer festival theme. Suou greets them as she whispers to Tokiwa's ear on their festival visit the previous day being a date, flustering Tokiwa. Upon noticing Tokiwa eyeing the other patrons, Suou turns his gaze towards her, teasing him in the process.
10	"That Time You Went to My Place and..." Transliteration: "Jitaku ni Ittara Batsubatsu Datta Hanashi" (Japanese: 自宅に行ったら××だった話)	Yūsuke Onoda	Kenichi Yamashita	Masayoshi Nishida	December 7, 2024
Asagi asks Kohaku for advice on becoming cool, leading a confused Kohaku to write lines she uses for her bossy persona. Asagi attempts to charm Fuji with the lines but fails; Fuji reassures him he is fine with the way he currently is. After finishing another manga of Fuji the following morning, Fuji cuffs Asagi with a handcuff, surprising him. Asagi excitedly cuffs her back, but they become nervous when they do not find its key; they are forced to head to the post office to send in Fuji's manga where they realize the handcuff is a toy. Sometime later, Suou grows sick after working for several days, prompting Fuji to message Tokiwa. Despite seeing her condition to be minor, Tokiwa takes Suou back to her home; as he is about to leave, Tokiwa sees her collapsed on the floor and immediately tends to her health as he comments on seeing a vulnerable side to her, charming Suou.
11	"That Time I Went to the Beach and..." Transliteration: "Umi ni Ittara Batsubatsu Datta Hanashi" (Japanese: 海に行ったら××だった話)	Fumio Maezono	Kenichi Yamashita	Fumikazu Sato	December 14, 2024
Hagi remains conflicted of his feelings for Kohaku after seeing her feminine appearance when she suddenly calls him for help. Arriving to her aid with his friends, Hagi is surprised to see Kohaku and her colleagues working at a beach house, where they learn it is her family's shop and they are working part-time to cater to a large crowd. Hagi agrees to assist and aims to protect Kohaku from anyone attempting to approach her. When Hagi notices a group of men comment on Kohaku's physique, he steps in to defend her and runs off with Kohaku, clarifying his actions to her in defeat before running off. The group rests after finishing work as Kohaku and her colleagues dress back to their feminine appearances, unnerving Hagi; they then enjoy their time at the beach with fireworks. Kohaku opens up to Hagi on noticing him being uneasy around her and assumes it is her fault. Hagi vaguely explains he sees his confusion on treating Kohaku's bossy and off-duty personae as two-timing, leaving Kohaku in shock of his misinterpreted actions, much to Hagi's horror.
12	"That Time I Went to a Mixer and... (Thought I'd Never Need to Go to Another Mixer Again)"; Transliteration: "Gōkon ni Ittara mō Gōkon ni wa Ikanakute mo ī ka Natte Omoeru Deai Datta Hanashi" (Japanese: 合コンに行ったら（もう合コンには行かなくてもいいかなって思える出会い）だった話)	Kazuomi Koga	Deko Akao	Kazuomi Koga	December 21, 2024
Hagi further clarifies on his recent turmoil by representing himself as a troubled friend, remarking that despite the confusion, he still likes Kohaku for who she is as an overall person. Kohaku replies that he should not be troubled by trivial matters, comforting Hagi; as they reunite with the group, Kohaku realizes that Hagi was subtly confessing his feelings to her. The next day, Tokiwa decides to go sightseeing on his own with Asagi and Hagi still asleep when he runs into Suou. Suou tags along with Tokiwa and they visit the beach's local attractions, during which they bond. The two travel to a lookout overviewing the sea and encounter a bell that can grant wishes by ringing it. Suou invites Tokiwa to jointly ring the bell for her wish, leaving Tokiwa to wonder on it. Sometime later, Tokiwa, Asagi, and Hagi jointly reflect on their mixer with Suou, Kohaku, and Fuji, as the trio orders their drinks at the cross-dressing bar and participate in a game.

== Reception ==
The series was nominated for the eighth Next Manga Awards in the web category in 2022, and was ranked 7th out of 50 nominees. The series, alongside Mimasaka's Heika, Kokoro no Koe ga Dadamore Desu!, won the Women's Comic Prize at NTT Solmare's "Minna ga Erabu!! Denshi Comic Taishō 2023" competition in 2023.

The series has 1.1 million copies in circulation as of October 2023.
