= The Most Heretical Last Boss Queen =

Japanese light novel series

- The Most Heretical Last Boss Queen: From Villainess to Savior
- First light novel volume cover, featuring (from left to right) Stale Royal Ivy, Pride Royal Ivy, and Arthur Bersford

悲劇の元凶となる最強外道ラスボス女王は民の為に尽くします。 (Higeki no Genkyō to naru Saikyō Gedō Last Boss Joō wa Min no tame ni Tsukushimasu)
- Genre: Isekai
- Novel series
- Written by: Tenichi
- Published by: Shōsetsuka ni Narō
- Original run: April 19, 2018 – present
- Light novel
- Written by: Tenichi
- Illustrated by: Suzunosuke
- Published by: Ichijinsha
- English publisher: NA: Seven Seas Entertainment
- Imprint: Iris NEO
- Original run: June 4, 2019 – present
- Volumes: 13
- Manga
- Written by: Tenichi
- Illustrated by: Bunko Matsuura
- Published by: Ichijinsha
- English publisher: NA: Seven Seas Entertainment
- Magazine: Zero-Sum Online
- Original run: March 19, 2020 – March 18, 2022
- Volumes: 3
- Manga

To The Savior
- Written by: Tenichi
- Illustrated by: Akiko Kawano
- Published by: Ichijinsha
- Magazine: Monthly Comic Zero Sum
- Original run: June 28, 2023 – December 27, 2024
- Volumes: 2
- Manga

The Savior's Pride
- Written by: Tenichi
- Illustrated by: Akiko Kawano
- Published by: Ichijinsha
- Magazine: Monthly Comic Zero Sum
- Original run: March 28, 2025 – present
- Volumes: 1
- Anime television series
- Directed by: Norio Nitta
- Written by: Deko Akao
- Music by: Hanae Nakamura; Tatsuhiko Saiki; Kanade Sakuma; Junko Nakajima; Misaki Tsuchida (S2); Tsugumi Tanaka (S2); Kaho Sawada (S2)
- Studio: OLM Team Yoshioka
- Licensed by: Sentai Filmworks: SA/SEA: Muse Communication
- Original network: Tokyo MX, BS11, MBS
- Original run: July 7, 2023 – June 23, 2026
- Episodes: 24
- icon

The Most Heretical Last Boss Queen: From Villainess to Savior (Japanese: 悲劇の元凶となる最強外道ラスボス女王は民の為に尽くします。, Hepburn: Higeki no Genkyō to naru Saikyō Gedō Last Boss Joō wa Min no tame ni Tsukushimasu; "The Final Boss, the Ultimate Villain and the Cause of the Tragedy, Is the Queen Who Does Everything for Her People") is a Japanese light novel series written by Tenichi. The series originated on the Shōsetsuka ni Narō website in April 2018, before being published in print with illustrations by Suzunosuke by Ichijinsha beginning in June 2019. A manga adaptation, illustrated by Bunko Matsuura, was serialized on the Zero-Sum Online website between March 2020 and March 2022. An anime television series adaptation by OLM aired from July to September 2023. A second season aired from April to June 2026.

== Plot ==
One day, an eight-year-old girl named Pride Royal Ivy regains memories of her past life and discovers she has been reincarnated in the otome game Our Ray of Light. In-game, Pride is a sadistic and monstrous young girl who grows up to become a callous queen and serves as the final boss, who meets her end at the hands of her younger sister whom she wronged. Realizing this, Pride uses her skills and knowledge of the game to become a compassionate and benevolent ruler. She hopes that by changing her ways, this will lead to a better future for her kingdom and the people around her.

== Characters ==
Pride Royal Ivy (プライド・ロイヤル・アイビー, Puraido Roiyaru Aibī)
Voiced by: Fairouz Ai (Japanese); Karlii Hoch (English)
Pride is a young Japanese girl who has been reincarnated as the villainess of the otome game Our Ray of Light. The original Pride was a monstrously selfish woman who callously abused everyone, being seen as a devil in human form; only to eventually meet her end at the hands of her younger sister. The current Pride uses her memory of the original timeline to save and protect everyone that would have been abused by her; unintentionally causing them and herself to have glimpses of the original timeline. Whenever she makes alterations to the current timeline, the actions of her original self are seemingly imprinted onto others who carry them out in her place. She possesses a "cheat ability" that makes her an incredibly strong fighter and the ability to foresee the future.
Stale Royal Ivy (ステイル・ロイヤル・アイビー, Suteiru Roiyaru Aibī)
Voiced by: Maaya Uchida (season 1), Koki Uchiyama (Note: Uchiyama previously voiced an older version of Stale in season 1 prior to taking over the role in season 2.^{Ep. 8 credits}) (season 2) (Japanese); James Marler (English)
Stale is the adopted brother and assistant of Pride and possesses the power of teleportation. The original Pride placed him under a magical contract which forced him to obey her, taking advantage of his inability to read and write anything other than his own name, and then ordered him to murder his birth mother; leading him to swear revenge, being healed by her younger sister Tiara and becoming one of her love interests. The current Pride has treated him with great care and compassion, notably allowing him to communicate with his birth mother, and so earning his loyalty and love. He is frenemies with Arthur.
Tiara Royal Ivy (ティアラ・ロイヤル・アイビー, Tiara Roiyaru Aibī)
Voiced by: Haruka Tomatsu (Japanese); Brittney Karbowski (English)
Tiara is the younger sister of Pride. In the original timeline, she ultimately killed her older sister. In the current timeline, she instead has a close relationship with Pride and does not fight with her. When the Copelandii declares war on Freesia, Tiara rises to the occasion and learns how to fight in order to join her older sister.
Arthur Beresford (アーサー・ベレスフォード, Āsā Berusufōdo)
Voiced by: Junya Enoki (Japanese); Adam Gibbs, Shannon Emerick (young) (English)
Arthur is the son of the Knight Captain Rodrick who possesses the power to improve the vitality of plants. In the original timeline, he watched as his father died in battle while the original Pride mocked the fallen soldiers, leading him to swear vengeance against her to the point of not allowing the original Tiara to get close to him due to her relation to Pride. He eventually opened up to Tiara, becoming one of her love interests, and aided her in bringing down her tyrannical sister. The current Pride used her skill to enter the battle herself, saving his father's life and earning Arthur's loyalty. He is frenemies with Stale.
Rosa Royal Ivy (ローザ・ロイヤル・アイビー, Rōza Roiyaru Aibī)
Voiced by: Kikuko Inoue (Japanese); Shelley Calene-Black (English)
Pride and Tiara's mother.
Albert Royal Ivy (アルバート・ロイヤル・アイビー, Arubāto Roiyaru Aibī)
Voiced by: Toshiyuki Morikawa (Japanese); Brandon Hearnsberger (English)
Pride and Tiara's father.
Gilbert Butler (ジルベール・バトラー, Jirubēru Batorā)
Voiced by: Kōji Yusa (Japanese); Jay Hickman, Shannon Emerick (young) (English)
A chancellor who works for Albert. In the original timeline, he committed shady acts to save his wife, but fell victim to Pride's plans. In the alternate timeline, Pride helps to save his wife's life. He can change his appearance to make himself younger or older.
Roderick Beresford (ロデリック・ベレスフォード, Roderikku Beresufōdo)
Voiced by: Hiroki Yasumoto (Japanese); Luis Galindo (English)
Arthur's father and the Knight Captain.
Clark Darwin (クラーク・ダーウィン, Kurāku Dāwin)
Voiced by: Toshihiko Seki (Japanese); Joe Daniels (English)
One of the royal knights.
Callum Bordeaux (カラム・ボルドー, Karamu Borudō)
Voiced by: Daisuke Ono (Japanese); Courtland Johnson (English)
One of the royal knights, who is also a butler.
Eric Gilchrist (エリック・ギルクリスト, Erikku Girukuriesuto)
Voiced by: Takuma Nagatsuka (Japanese); Blake Weir (English)
One of the royal knights.
Alan Berners (アラン・バーナーズ, Aran Bānāzu)
Voiced by: Hiro Shimono (Japanese); Heath Morrow (English)
One of the royal knights.
Val (ヴァル, Varu)
Voiced by: Junichi Suwabe (Japanese); Jeremy Gee (English)
A criminal who assisted an army of rebels against the kingdom of Freesia. He possesses Earth magic. His actions are really to save two orphans Sefek and Kemet, who were captured by criminals. In the alternate timeline, Pride helps to save the kids and he becomes her subordinate in return. His time with Pride makes Stale and Arthur jealous.
Sefek (セフェク, Sefeku)
Voiced by: M.A.O (Japanese); Brianna Roberts (English)
One of the orphans whom Val befriends. She possesses water magic.
Kemet (ケメト, Kemeto)
Voiced by: Shizuka Ishigami (Japanese); Chelsea McCurdy (English)
One of the orphans whom Val befriends.
Leon Adonis Coronaria (レオン・アドニス・コロナリア, Reon Adonisu Koronaria)
Voiced by: Shinnosuke Tachibana (Japanese); Jack Stansbury (English)
The first prince of the Anemone Kingdom and one of Pride's love interests. In the original story, Pride tortured him and broke his heart while making him kill his own people after he was turned over to her due to the machinations of his younger brothers, Edwin and Homer, as part of a plot to seize the throne and ally with her; this left him in a broken state until he was healed by Tiara, making him become one of her allies and love interests, as he strived to bring down his brothers and Pride. The current Pride instead willingly gets engaged to Leon and does not torture him nor his people. She also discovers his love for his people and saves him from his brothers' machinations; making him the rightful heir to his family's throne and annulling their false engagement, yet their love for each other remains real. He holds a respectful friendship with Cedric, due to their kingdoms being longtime allies.
Gregorio Adonis Coronaria (グレゴリオ・アドニス・コロナリア, Guregorio Adonisu Koronaria)
Voiced by: Yū Maeda^{Ep. 14 credits} (Japanese); Chris Hutchinson (English)
The ruler of the Anemone kingdom. He is Leon, Homer, and Erwin's father. He was a distressed man who was marred by the false rumors spread of his oldest son and plagued by the corrupt actions of his two younger sons. In the original timeline, he died of an illness, which allowed his two younger sons to do what they pleased with his kingdom, leading it to near complete destruction. In the current timeline, he is reunited with Leon and crowns him the rightful heir after Erwin and Homer's machinations are revealed; promptly stripping his corrupt sons of their titles, power, and positions before having them imprisoned. After shaking hands with Arthur, he is healed by the knight's special ability and still stands as king.
Erwin Adonis Coronaria (エルヴィン・アドニス・コロナリア, Eruvin Adonisu Koronaria)
Voiced by: Kyōhei Natsume (Japanese); Rex Rosario (English)
Leon's younger brother who plots to overthrow him. Posing as a loving and devoted younger brother, Edwin secretly despises Leon and desires the throne for his own selfish ambitions. While putting on the facade of a caring younger brother; in actuality, he is a spoiled and selfish prince who is never satisfied with what he has. With the aid of his brother Homer, he spread lies about Leon being a philanderer throughout the Anemone Kingdom to ruin his reputation. In the original timeline, he and his brother made a deal with Princess Pride: turning their brother and many of their own people over to her to do with as she pleased. As crown prince, he led his kingdom to near ruin, causing he and his brother try to seek out Leon to fix their own mistakes only to be furiously rebuffed by the broken crown prince. They tried to use Tiara as a hostage to force their older brother's hand, only to be thwarted and forced to flee. In the current timeline, Pride exposes his and Homer's scheme before it comes to fruition and they are arrested after being stripped of their titles and power.
Homer Adonis Coronaria (ホーマー・アドニス・コロナリア, Hōmā Adonisu Koronaria)
Voiced by: Ayato Morinaga (Japanese); Joshua Swasey (English)
Leon's other younger brother who plots to overthrow him. Posing as a loving and devoted younger brother, Homer secretly despises Leon and desires the throne for his own selfish ambitions. While putting on the facade of a caring younger brother; in actuality, he is spoiled and selfish prince who is never satisfied with what he has. With the aid of his brother Edwin, he spread lies about Leon being a philanderer throughout the Anemone Kingdom to ruin his reputation. In the original timeline, he and his brother made a deal with Princess Pride: turning their brother and many of their own people over to her to do with as she pleased. As crown prince, he led his kingdom to near ruin, causing he and his brother try to seek out Leon to fix their own mistakes only to be furiously rebuffed by the broken crown prince. They tried to use Tiara as a hostage to force their older brother's hand, only to be thwarted and forced to flee. In the current timeline, Pride exposes his and Edwin's scheme before it comes to fruition and they are arrested after being stripped of their titles and power.
Cedric Silva Lowell (セドリック・シルバ・ローウェル, Sedorikku Shiruba Rōweru)
Voiced by: Hikaru Midorikawa
The second-born prince of the Hanazuo Kingdom who is a bit spoiled. In the original timeline, Cedric fled his home when it was besieged by the corrupt Copelandii kingdom as he sought to establish an alliance with the kingdom of Freesia. Unbeknownst to him, Pride had already sided with the Copelandii kingdom prior to his arrival. As a result, she forced him into becoming her slave once she revealed the truth. In the current timeline, Cedric comes to Freesia to request their aid in fighting off the Copelandii kingdom, which is ultimately successful after Pride confronts him over his spoiled behavior and convinces him to confess the truth. He becomes moved that Pride and her friends are willing to aid him, even when they do not agree with his prior behavior. He holds a respectful friendship with Leon, due to their kingdoms being longtime allies.
Harrison Dirk (ハリソン・ディルク, Harison Diruku)
Voiced by: Ryōta Suzuki
The captain of the eighth squadron. His fighting skills are considerably scary.
Lance Silva Lowell (ランス・シルバ・ローウェル, Ransu Shiruba Rōweru)
Voiced by: Satoshi Hino^{Ep. 20 credits}
Cedric's older brother and the ruler of Cercis who disapproves of his bad behavior. In the original timeline, he went insane, which led to Cercis's collapse. In the current timeline, Pride helps to cure him and prevents the kingdom's collapse.
Yohan Linne Dwight (ヨアン・リンネ・ドワイト, Yoan Rinne Dowaito)
Voiced by: Atsushi Tamaru^{Ep. 20 credits}
The ruler of Chinensis who has a close bond with Cedric.
Fargus (ファーガス, Fāgasu)
Voiced by: Kazuki Yoshida^{Ep. 22 credits}
A noble from Cercis who is a close friend of Cedric's.
Dario (ダリオ)
A noble from Cercis who is a close friend of Cedric's.
Esmond (エスモンド, Esumondo)
Voiced by: Yuji Murai^{Ep. 23 credits}
The chancellor of Chinensis.

== Media ==
=== Light novel ===
Written by Tenichi, the series began serialization on the novel posting website Shōsetsuka ni Narō on April 19, 2018. The series was later acquired by Ichijinsha, who began publishing the series in print with illustrations by Suzunosuke on June 4, 2019. As of May 2026, thirteen volumes have been released.

In June 2021, Seven Seas Entertainment announced that they licensed the series for English publication.

==== Volumes ====
No.	Original release date	Original ISBN	English release date	English ISBN
1	June 4, 2019	978-4-75-809177-0	March 3, 2022 (digital); April 26, 2022 (print)	978-1-64-827842-6
2	March 3, 2020	978-4-75-809242-5	April 28, 2022 (digital); May 31, 2022 (print)	978-1-63-858265-6
3	January 7, 2021	978-4-75-809326-2	August 11, 2022 (digital); February 21, 2023 (print)	978-1-63-858704-0
4	September 2, 2021	978-4-75-809394-1	February 2, 2023 (digital); August 22, 2023 (print)	978-1-68-579628-0
5	April 4, 2022	978-4-75-809452-8	November 9, 2023 (digital); December 5, 2023 (print)	979-8-88843-071-2
6	November 2, 2022	978-4-75-809503-7	March 21, 2024 (digital); April 23, 2024 (print)	979-8-88843-440-6
7	August 2, 2023	978-4-75-809570-9	July 18, 2024 (digital); September 24, 2024 (print)	979-8-89160-295-3
8	April 2, 2024	978-4-75-809630-0	January 30, 2025 (digital); February 25, 2025 (print)	979-8-89373-178-1
9	December 3, 2024	978-4-75809-689-8	August 7, 2025 (digital); September 23, 2025 (print)	979-8-89561-546-1
10	April 2, 2025	978-4-75809-717-8	March 19, 2026 (digital); April 14, 2026 (print)	979-8-89561-927-8
11	July 2, 2025	978-4-75809-741-3	November 3, 2026 (print)	979-8-89765-945-6
12	October 2, 2025	978-4-75809-760-4	—	—
13	May 2, 2026	978-4-75809-865-6	—	—

=== Manga ===
A manga adaptation, illustrated by Bunko Matsuura, was serialized on Ichijinsha's Zero-Sum Online website from March 19, 2020, to March 18, 2022. As of January 2022, the series' individual chapters have been collected into three tankōbon volumes. In October 2022, it was announced that the manga adaptation had been cancelled due to the poor health of the artist.

A new manga adaptation covering the "Val Arc", illustrated by Akiko Kawano, was serialized in Ichijinsha's Monthly Comic Zero Sum magazine on June 28, 2023, to December 27, 2024. A manga adaptation covering the "Fiance Arc", again illustrated by Kawano, began serialization in the same magazine on March 28, 2025.

Seven Seas Entertainment is also publishing the manga adaptation in English.

==== First manga ====
No.	Original release date	Original ISBN	English release date	English ISBN
1	October 24, 2020	978-4-75-803554-5	April 5, 2022	978-1-64-827843-3
2	April 30, 2021	978-4-75-803602-3	June 28, 2022	978-1-63-858323-3
3	January 31, 2022	978-4-75-803703-7	February 14, 2023	978-1-63-858728-6

==== To The Savior ====
No.	Original release date	Original ISBN	English release date	English ISBN
1	February 29, 2024	978-4-75-803993-2	—	—
2	January 31, 2025	978-4-75-808646-2	—	—

==== The Savior's Pride ====
No.	Original release date	Original ISBN	English release date	English ISBN
1	October 31, 2025	978-4-75-808833-6	—	—
2	May 29, 2026	978-4-75-809914-1	—	—

=== Anime ===
An anime television series adaptation was announced on October 28, 2022. It was produced by OLM and directed by Norio Nitta, with Deko Akao writing the scripts, Hitomi Kōno designing the characters, and Hanae Nakamura, Tatsuhiko Saiki, Kanade Sakuma, and Junko Nakajima composing the music. It aired from July 7 to September 22, 2023, on Tokyo MX and other networks. (Note: Tokyo MX listed the series premiere on July 6 at 24:00, which is effectively July 7 at midnight JST.) The opening theme song is "Kyūseishu" (救世主; "Savior") by Tsukuyomi, while the ending theme song is "Pride" by ChoQMay. In March 2023, Sentai Filmworks announced that it would stream the series on its Hidive streaming service as part of a multi-year partnership between it and Mainichi Broadcasting, and is the first series to be released from the partnership. Muse Communication has also licensed the series in Asia-Pacific.

A second season was announced on June 30, 2025. Misaki Tsuchida, Tsugumi Tanaka, and Kaho Sawada composed the music with Nakamura, Saiki, Sakuma, and Nakajima. While it had an advanced screening at Anime Boston 2026, the season aired from April 7 to June 23, 2026. The opening theme song is "Ego" (エゴ) by Retroriron, while the ending theme song is "Tarareba" (たられば; "What If") by Garakuta.

==== Season 1 (2023) ====
No. overall	No. in season	Title	Directed by (Note: Information is taken from the ending credits of each episode.)	Written by	Storyboarded by	Original release date
1	1	"The Selfish Princess Awakens"; Transliteration: "Wagamama Ōjo wa Me o Samasu" (Japanese: ～我儘王女は目を覚ます～)	Jōji Shimura	Deko Akao	Norio Nitta	July 7, 2023
A young girl is killed by a passing truck and is reborn in a world based on the otome game Our Ray of Light as its main antagonist Pride Royal Ivy. Recalling the game's plot, she is unwilling to follow the same dark path as the real Pride and decides to change the story. She starts by warning her father of a faulty wheel on his carriage and almost falls out of a window before being saved by a guard. She later meets Stale, a young boy with teleportation abilities, who was brought to the castle to be her servant. Pride recalls that her real counterpart tricked him into signing a contract that forced him to obey her and made him kill his mother, causing him to swear revenge. She is desperate to help him even after he collapses from a fever, considering him as a brother.
2	2	"The Villainous Princess Makes a Request of Her Brother"; Transliteration: "Gokuaku Ōjo wa Gitei ni Negau" (Japanese: ～極悪王女は義弟に願う～)	Mayu Numayama	Deko Akao	Norio Nitta	July 14, 2023
After Pride and Stale express pain from their recent experiences, the two begin to slowly bond. Slate also learns that his mother is doing okay. He later overhears Gilbert Butler, the chancellor, having a suspicious conversation with some men. Pride and Stale pay a visit to see Tiara, Pride's younger sister. Pride recalls that in the original plot, the real Pride had tortured her love interests and since Tiara is the game's protagonist, she will eventually kill her older sister. To prevent this from happening, Pride forms a loving relationship with her. They continue to enjoy the party hosted in the castle, which involves an awkward conversation with Gilbert, Pride and Tiara's parents talking about their daughter's future, and a meeting with the knight captain Roderick Beresford.
3	3	"The Heretical Princess and the Knights"; Transliteration: "Gedō Ōjo to Kishidan" (Japanese: ～外道王女と騎士団～)	Takahiro Hirata	Deko Akao	Norio Nitta	July 21, 2023
Stale begins training with a sword, with Pride also joining in and Tiara watching them. While watching the knights train, Pride recalls how her real counterpart treated them. After learning that their army is losing in a fight against a group of enemy soldiers and Roderick is in trouble, Pride helps them using Stale's teleportation ability to send them supplies. Arthur, Roderick's son, becomes concerned about his father. Pride decides to join the fight herself to save Roderick. She manages to defeat the enemy soldiers and capture their leader Val, who has Earth powers, just before the rocks above them give way.
4	4	"The Worst Princess and the Young Man's Vow"; Transliteration: "Saitei Ōjo to Chikai no Seinen" (Japanese: ～最低王女と誓いの青年～)	Nozomi Ishii	Deko Akao	Tomoko Akiyama	July 28, 2023
A flashback shows that in the game's original plot, the real Pride showed little regard for the soldiers who were killed in the battle, including Roderick, which led Arthur to swear revenge on her. In the alternate timeline, Pride, Roderick, and Val have survived the rockslide, though Pride is embarrassed that her dress is torn, exposing her underwear. Back at the castle, the knights question Pride about her fighting skills. Roderick is not pleased that Pride would endanger herself to save him, but she reminds him of how his son would feel if he did die. Everyone is grateful for Pride's heroics, including Arthur, who decides to support her from now on.
5	5	"The Wicked Princess and the Sword"; Transliteration: "Kokuaku Ōjo to Ken" (Japanese: ～酷悪王女と剣～)	Jōji Shimura	Takashi Ifukube	Akiko Nagashima	August 4, 2023
Arthur trains with his father to become a knight working for Pride; however, his training ends early due to Roderick having to leave for the castle. Meanwhile, Pride recalls Arthur's fate in the original timeline, but lets it slide as she now has a good relationship with Stale and Tiara. She later meets up with the knight and Roderick, but Arthur catches up to him to not only return his sword, but also berate him for neglecting him. Stale decides to help Arthur train, to which they reveal their relationships with Pride as they become frenemies.
6	6	"The Selfish Princess Passes Judgment"; Transliteration: "Jikochū Ōjo wa Sabaku" (Japanese: ～自己中王女は裁く～)	Mayu Numayama	Michihiro Tsuchiya	Kōsaku Taniguchi	August 11, 2023
While reading books, Pride learns from her parents of Val's true intentions. Although they consider executing him, they instead decide to have him sign a contract that forces him to work for Pride. She lets him leave, although he is unable to do any harm due to the contract. Pride and Tiara later watch Arthur and Stale practice sword fighting. They later make flower crowns for the sisters while struggling to confess their feelings for them. Unbeknownst to them, Gilbert is watching.
7	7	"The Coldhearted Princess and the Quitter"; Transliteration: "Reikoku Ōjo to Yameru Hito" (Japanese: ～冷酷王女とヤメルヒト～)	Yūki Morita	Takashi Ifukube	Norio Nitta	August 18, 2023
Pride deems Arthur an official knight and Stale is given a pair of glasses. Suspicious of Gilbert, the two eavesdrop on him and Albert and learn of his wife's illness; he was searching for someone to cure his wife. Pride remembers that her real self did not help him at all and let his wife die, and that Gilbert has the ability to change his appearance. After learning of Gilbert's disappearance, Pride and Stale set off to find him. Gilbert has hired thieves to dig up information on the royal family, but is double-crossed. As he fights the criminals, Pride and Stale arrive to help. After defeating them, Gilbert explains everything to them.
8	8	"The Insolent Princess and the Judgment"; Transliteration: "Burei Ōjo to Sabaki" (Japanese: ～無礼王女と裁き～)	Ken'ichi Nishida	Takashi Ifukube	Tomoko Akiyama	August 25, 2023
Stale is displeased with Gilbert's actions, but Pride convinces him to stand down. Returning to the castle, Pride informs the knights there of Gilbert's intentions. Bringing Arthur to Gilbert's house, Pride has him use his healing abilities to cure Gilbert's fiancée. It also revealed that Gilbert can make people younger or older as he made Stale into an adult recently. As such, Pride chooses not to punish Gilbert for his crimes. Stale and Arthur get into an argument over their desires to help their families. Stale later agrees to forgive Gilbert.
9	9	"The Cruel Princess and the Criminal"; Transliteration: "Zankoku Ōjo to Zainin" (Japanese: ～残酷王女と罪人～)	Akira Ishii	Deko Akao	Norio Nitta; Akira Ishii	September 1, 2023
Arthur has slowly been improving his swordsmanship. Everyone later come across Val, who requests her to help rescue some children named Kemet and Sefek, who are held hostage by criminals. They provide him with a place to stay. He tells them more about how he met the children, to which he almost becomes violent. Pride understands his pain and agrees to help.
10	10	"The Coldhearted Princess Sneaks In"; Transliteration: "Hakujō Ōjo wa Sennyū Suru" (Japanese: ～薄情王女は潜入する～)	Mayu Numayama	Michihiro Tsuchiya	Akiko Nagashima	September 8, 2023
Val turns in some kids, who are actually Pride, Arthur, Stale, and Gilbert in disguise, to the criminals in exchange for Kemet and Sefek. The criminals double-cross Val and take him hostage too. Reaching their hideout, Stale teleports two of the criminals into a cell in the castle, where two knights proceed to interrogate them. Stale then teleports the other captives to the castle, where they are aided by knights. As Pride, Arthur, and Gilbert are escorted to a cell, they find Kemet and Sefek. Meanwhile, Val and Stale rescue the captives. As Val distracts the crooks, the others help the captives escape, to which Sefek reveals that she can manipulate water. Stale rescues a boy who can uncontrollably manipulate electricity, but he and Val and captured. As the knights arrive, Pride and Arthur fight the bandit leader, eventually defeating him with Alan's help, but a bombing suddenly occurs.
11	11	"The Merciless Princess and the Order"; Transliteration: "Sankoku Ōjo to Meirei" (Japanese: ～惨酷王女と命令～)	Nozomi Ishii	Takashi Ifukube	Tomoko Akiyama	September 15, 2023
The group run to escape the hideout, but Val and Sefek are separated from the others. As everyone escapes, Val, Gilbert, and Pride rescue Kemet. Once back outside, a mysterious group, who are responsible for the bombing from earlier, watches them from their invisible hot air balloon. They depart, leaving behind bombs which they drop on the group below. Val sacrifices himself to save the others, but Pride and Stale save him. Val then recalls how he met Sefek and Kemet and how they were captured.
12	12	"The Treacherous Princess Faces the Future"; Transliteration: "Akugyaku Ōjo wa Mirai ni Mukau" (Japanese: ～悪虐王女は未来に向かう～)	Sayaka Yamai	Deko Akao	Norio Nitta	September 22, 2023
Having survived the bombing, the group return to the castle. Pride decides to have Val, Sefek, and Kemet serve as their carriers. Val then becomes smitten with Pride, making Stale and Arthur jealous. The two later practice fighting with Gilbert, but end up losing. Val begins to question his feelings for Pride. Stale and Arthur vow to continue to protect Pride and Tiara.

==== Season 2 (2026) ====
No. overall	No. in season	Title	Directed by	Written by	Storyboarded by	Original release date
13	1	"The Cruel Queen and the Fiance"; Transliteration: "Bōgyaku Ōjo to Fianse" (Japanese: 暴虐王女と婚約者)	Mayu Numayama	Deko Akao	Tomoko Akiyama	April 7, 2026
Pride and her friends, now teenagers, are getting ready for Pride's upcoming birthday party. Stale and Arthur learn that Pride is engaged to someone else. Pride remembers that her real counterpart had two love interests and one of them is here: a prince named Leon Adonis Coronaria, but Pride recalls how the real Pride eventually proceeded to torture and break his heart. Pride instead chooses to be engaged to him. Val, Kemet, and Sefek soon visit Pride and Val expresses his feelings for Pride before he, Sefek, and Kemet leave. Leon later takes Pride and her friends on a tour to his kingdom. Stale and Arthur get jealous of Leon, but are also suspicious of him and Pride. After Leon leaves, Val returns with Kemet and Sefek, and Pride vows to make Leon happy.
14	2	"The Cruel Queen Speaks"; Transliteration: "Bōgyaku Ōjo wa Kuchi wo Hiraku" (Japanese: 暴虐王女は口を開く)	Ki Sup Lee	Deko Akao	Takeshi Mori	April 14, 2026
Stale is determined to discover why Pride is to be engaged to Leon. After finding Pride asleep with Tiara outside, Stale's suspicion of Leon increases, but his loyalty to Pride still remains. Arthur has trouble confessing his feelings for Pride, but is also concerned about her earlier behavior with Leon. He too maintains his loyalty to Pride. Later, Pride decides to go to the Anemone Kingdom. This further raises Tiara, Stale, and Arthur's suspicious. Tiara convinces Pride to tell the truth. It is revealed that Pride told Leon about her foresight ability and gives him a warning about his future. The team agree to help Pride with her plan to protect Leon and persuade her to accept it. Leon also recalls his past and begins to express doubt in terms of how he behaves towards women. He also wishes to secure peace between Freesia and Anemone, but his engagement with Pride is threatened to be called off as Pride prepares to move to Anemone. Leon turns down his brothers' advice to leave the castle as a result of him heeding Pride's warnings, but he ends up at a bar after drinking wine while in disguise.
15	3	"The Cruel Queen and the Truth"; Transliteration: "Bōgyaku Ōjo to Shinjitsu" (Japanese: 暴虐王女と真実)	Nozomi Ishii	Takashi Ifukube	Norio Nitta	April 21, 2026
In the original timeline, Pride threatened Leon by making him murder his people in order to make him fall in love with her. In the alternate timeline, Leon has passed out in the bar, leaving him in danger of being revealed. Val and his friends save Leon and bring him to Pride. Stale teleports him back to the castle, but he will not wake up until the next day due to him being drugged. It turns out two men gave him the drug in the castle and took him to the bar. A furious Pride deduces that Leon's brothers are to blame for this, having did it out of jealousy. In the original timeline, Tiara was the one who found out the truth. Pride plans to reveal the truth to Leon and stop his brothers. After Leon learns of the plot, Pride convinces him to help deal with his brothers, despite the consequences of how this will affect Anemone. She also remembers how her real counterpart treated Leon in the original timeline. Leon eventually agrees to help.
16	4	"The Cruel Queen Makes a Declaration"; Transliteration: "Bōgyaku Ōjo wa Sengensuru" (Japanese: 暴虐王女は宣言する)	Jōji Shimura	Deko Akao	Akira Nishimori	April 28, 2026
Pride tells Leon that it was Val who rescued him earlier, albeit reluctantly. Pride later sees Gregorio, Leon's father, and requests a meeting with Leon's brothers Erwin and Homer. She and Leon expose Erwin and Homer's scheme, but the two deny it. Gregorio does not fall for their lies and has them arrested. Pride then cancels her engagement to Leon to ensure that he takes the throne. She also reveals the terrible future outcome of the kingdom without Leon's presence, swearing they will remain allies. Erwin and Homer do not like that idea, but Pride angrily lectures them in return, knowing of their actions in the original timeline. Leon is grateful for Pride's help. Once peace is formed between Freesia and Anemone, Leon expresses his feelings for Pride before she heads home.
17	5	"The Cruel Queen Takes a Notice, and is Noticed"; Transliteration: "Kokuhaku Ōjo wa Kidzuki, Soshite Kidzukareru" (Japanese: 酷薄王女は気付き、そして気付かれる)	Hideaki Ōba	Deko Akao	Hideaki Ōba	May 5, 2026
Stale and Arthur start to get jealous of Leon after he kissed Pride. Leon on the other hand secretly doubts his relationship with Pride, though he still loves her. Pride is still shaken up by Leon's kiss, but she eventually recovers and begins to understand the meaning of love from Callum. Val questions them about Pride's relationship with Leon, all while helping them return home faster. Pride's mother Rosa is upset that things did not go well for Pride thanks to Erwin and Homer's actions, but Pride assures her otherwise and expresses her love for her mother. However, Pride also learns that her mother has foreseen the events of the original timeline. Stale later questions Pride about this and Pride tearfully confesses the future actions of Erwin and Homer, which she just could not ignore, before Stale cheers her up. Determined to not allow Pride to end up becoming a pawn in the machinations of corrupt nobles from another kingdom again, he later asks Pride's parents to allow him to assist in finding another fiancé for Pride with Gilbert's help. The two agree, and Gilbert starts helping out with Stale's plan.
18	6	"The Audacious Queen and Alcohol"; Transliteration: "Furachi Ōjo to Sake" (Japanese: 不埒王女と酒)	Sayaka Yamai	Takashi Ifukube	Tomoko Akiyama	May 12, 2026
While drinking alcohol, one of the knights senses that Arthur has a crush on Pride. Earlier, Arthur spoke to Pride regarding their relationships with the others. Stale visits Arthur and the knights, but he had to throw Arthur out due to how drunk he is, though the latter comes back in after quickly sobering up. The two then get into a fight over their held back feelings for Pride. After that, Stale decides to keep distrustful people away from Pride and assigns the knights as her bodyguards. Meanwhile, Val's group have their own meal with Leon, with Leon wanting Val to be friends with him. Leon also suspects that Val has a crush on Pride, though the latter quickly denies it. Sometime later, Pride provides everyone with meals. Tiara encourages Pride to interact with Arthur and Stale directly via feeding them meals. Val does the same to Pride. Elsewhere, in a ruined castle, a mysterious man with purple hair resumes his plan to target Freesia.
19	7	"The Cruel Queen and Alliance Negotiations"; Transliteration: "Hidō Ōjo to Dōmei Kōshō" (Japanese: 非道王女と同盟交渉)	Nozomi Ishii	Takashi Ifukube	Hiroaki Yoshikawa	May 19, 2026
Arthur is now the vice captain of the eighth knight squadron. He is later attacked by Harrison, the knight squadron's captain, but he was really just testing Arthur. Leon tells Pride and Tiara about the second-born prince of the Cercis Kingdom, who wishes to establish a friendship with both him and Pride, and is visiting Freesia. Both Stale and Arthur are concerned about this and Arthur's new role. The prince eventually arrives, and Pride recognizes him as Cedric Silva Lowell, the game's final love interest. However, they also learn that he came here to establish a relationship without his brother knowing, which reveals how arrogant he is. Cedric comes to invite Pride and Tiara on a trip to his hometown. Pride notices that Cedric is behaving just like in the original timeline. He tries to kiss Pride, but Arthur stops him. Stale also learns about this and goes to talk to Cedric about it, with Gilbert joining the conversation. Pride and Tiara later help prepare new dishes with the food that Cedric gave them. However, they later find Cedric eating the food that was not meant for him, which upsets Pride.
20	8	"The Diabolical Princess and the Fool"; Transliteration: "Hidō Ōjo to Orokamono" (Japanese: 非道王女と愚か者)	Mayu Numayama	Takashi Ifukube	Norio Nitta	May 26, 2026
Pride is bitter over what happened with Cedric the previous day while Tiara tries to comfort her, only to end up falling asleep. While Tiara is still asleep, the now awake Pride sees the knights talking with Cedric also eavesdropping nearby. Though Cedric tries to apologize, Pride will not accept it. A hostile Cedric is still determined to establish an alliance. However, Arthur and the knights stop Cedric. They go to see Val and his friends and send them to deliver some letters. Cedric is not happy that the alliance is not going well and he plans to leave, but Pride will not let him until he tells her mother everything. Pride and her friends then take him to see the queen where he is forced to tell the truth. Cedric remembers how spoiled he was in the past along with his kingdom's forced alliance with another kingdom. He wants to form an alliance with Freesia to save his hometown from being destroyed in a war. Once Cedric tells them everything, they ask for more time to make a decision. Before leaving, Cedric apologizes for his behavior. However, he receives a message telling him to return home immediately.
21	9	"The Cruel Princess and the Request"; Transliteration: "Hidō Ōjo to Negai" (Japanese: 非道王女と願い)	Jōji Shimura	Takashi Ifukube	Jōji Shimura	June 2, 2026
Pride overhears Cedric's complaints and demands that he tells her everything. Cedric reveals that his kingdom is on the verge of being part of the upcoming war as the deadline is approaching fast. Pride remembers that in the original timeline, she took part in that war and manipulated Cedric once he ascended the throne. She convinces Cedric to tell her mother this. The queen cannot aid Cedric at the moment and will not let him return home until tomorrow. Queen Rosa then reveals that the Copelandii Kingdom's ally, the Rajah Empire, sent a letter of an alliance to them; admitting that the date of said contact is too close to Cedric's arrival to be a coincidence as well as finding it suspicious that they wanted to come directly to the kingdom. Pride decides to help Cedric in the war and the queen agrees. Stale and a squadron of knights are sent to help her. Later, Stale and Arthur talk about their relationships with Pride and how she treated Cedric before. Afterward, Stale struggles dealing with his feelings for Pride.
22	10	"The Cruel Princess and the Second-Born Prince"; Transliteration: "Hidō Ōjo to Daini Ōji" (Japanese: 非道王女と第二王子)	Nozomi Ishii	Takashi Ifukube	Norio Nitta & Akiko Nagashima	June 9, 2026
Pride visits Cedric to talk about his earlier actions. Pride also remembers that in the original timeline, her evil counterpart demanded gold from Cedric in exchange for her help in saving his kingdom and she eventually ordered him to kill Tiara. After waking up, she and her group, along with Leon and his country Anemone, all prepare to help Cedric in the upcoming war. Gilbert reveals that he recently caught spies who were trying to sabotage Freesia. The queen allows Pride to take part in the war. Tiara also wants to come too, which Pride reluctantly allows. Stale brings himself, Cedric, and their soldiers to Cedric's kingdom, Cercis. They meet Fargus and Dario, two nobles who are close allies of Cedric, who tell him that Lance is not doing well. Meanwhile, Pride is not happy about Tiara joining the battle until the latter confesses that she wishes to be like the former. The queen then establishes an allegiance with Cercis and Stale wishes to visit Lance to deduct his insane condition. Slate proceeds to bring Pride and a disguised Arthur to heal Lance. Seeing that Lance has recovered completely, Pride senses something is off.
23	11	"The Blasphemous Princess Prepares Herself"; Transliteration: "Bōtoku Ōjo wa Kakugo wo Kimeru" (Japanese: 冒涜王女は覚悟を決める)	Sayaka Yamai	Deko Akao	Shigeharu Takahashi	June 16, 2026
Pride tells Cedric to prepare for the upcoming war before she and her allies leave, promising to return in four days to help, but not before Cedric gives Arthur some rings to thank him for his help. Arthur reluctantly keeps the rings while Pride and Stale struggle to confess their feelings for each other. After they are ready, Pride, Arthur, Stale, Tiara, and their squadron of knights head to Cercis, using motorcycles to get there faster. While resting for the night, Pride tells Tiara the story of Cinderella while adding her love interests in it, unaware that the others were eavesdropping on them. Arriving at Cercis, they learn from Lance that the Kingdom of Chinensis has deemed Cercis an enemy nation, unaware that Lance has recovered. A wall prevents them from entering Chinensis. Pride realize that the game's plot is changing. Pride's group, with Cedric joining them, manages to get past the wall with the help of Stale's teleportation ability and meet Yohan, Chinensis's ruler. After he learns of Lance's recovery, Yohan urges Cedric to not be involved in the war, but Cedric refuses and insists on helping.
24	12	"The Blasphemous Princess Takes a Stand"; Transliteration: "Bōtoku Ōjo wa Tachiagaru" (Japanese: 冒涜王女は立ち上がる)	Mayu Numayama	Deko Akao	Akiko Nagashima	June 23, 2026
Yohan accepts Cedric's decision to help, but he is not sure if Chinensis's citizens will though. When Yohan tells the citizens of Chinensis's allegiance with Cercis and Freesia, they are not happy with this as they fear of losing the war. As Yohan prepares to conduct a blood oath, Pride steps in and boldly announces that Cercis and Freesia will support Chinensis. This at last convinces the citizens to help them, though Tiara, Stale, and Arthur are not happy with Pride's actions and are concerned about what will happen if they fail. Lance also agrees to help them. The next day, the three kingdoms prepare for battle. Everyone bows in respect to Pride as the war begins.

== Reception ==
In 2021, the first manga adaptation was nominated for the Next Manga Awards in the web category. In 2022, the first manga adaptation, along with Cafe Happiness: Food From Out of This World, won the Different World category award at NTT Solmare's "Minna ga Erabu!! Denshi Comic Taishō 2022".
