= Nishino =

Nishino (written: 西野) is a Japanese surname. Notable people with the surname include:

- Akira Nishino (politician)
- Akira Nishino (footballer)
- Kana Nishino, singer
- Nanase Nishino, singer
- Taeko Nishino (西野妙子; born 1975), Japanese singer and actress
- Yasumasa Nishino (footballer) (西野 泰正; born 1982), Japanese footballer
- Yasumasa Nishino (swimmer) (西野 恭正; 1925–2004), Japanese swimmer
- Yuji Nishino, baseball player
- Yuki Nishino, figure skater
