= Inazuma Eleven: Orion no Kokuin =

- Key visual with no logo
- No. of episodes: 49

Release
- Original network: TXN (TV Tokyo, TV Osaka)
- Original release: October 5, 2018 – September 27, 2019

Series chronology
- ← Previous; Ares

Inazuma Eleven: Orion no Kokuin (Japanese: イナズマイレブン オリオンの刻印, Hepburn: Inazuma Irebun Orion no Kokuin; lit. "Inazuma Eleven: The Seal of Orion") is a 2018 Japanese television anime series produced by OLM. Part of the Inazuma Eleven franchise, it is a sequel to Inazuma Eleven: Ares that was broadcast between April and September 2018. It began airing on TV Tokyo and its affiliates from October 2018 to September 2019.

== Plot summary ==
Orion revolves around a team called "Inazuma Japan"—composed of the best players of the previous Inazuma Eleven installments—that will act as a Japan national team and will face teams from around the world. First announced at "Inazuma Eleven Fes. 2018 + Japan National Team Roster Announcement", Orion no Kokuin continues from where Inazuma Eleven: Ares ended, covering Inazuma Japan's matches in the FFI. The story focuses on Inamori Asuto, Haizaki Ryouhei, Nosaka Yuuma and new character Ichihoshi Hikaru.

== Cast ==
- Ayumu Murase as Inamori Asuto (Sonny Wright)
- Nojima Hirofumi as Gouenji Shuuya (Axel Blaze)
- Kamiya Hiroshi as Haizaki Ryouhei (Eliot Ember)
- Hiroyuki Yoshino as Kidou Yuuto (Jude Sharp)
- Fukuyama Jun as Nosaka Yuuma (Heath Moore)
- Takeuchi Junko as Endou Mamoru (Mark Evans)
- Suzumura Kenichi as Nishikage Seiya (Duske Grayling)
- Miyake Kenta as Iwato Takashi (Cliff Parker)
- Miyano Mamoru as Fubuki Shirou/Atsuya (Shawn/Aiden Froste)
- Takahashi Rie as Sakanoue Noboru (Billy Miller)
- Shunsuke Takeuchi as Goujin Tetsunosuke (Adriano Donati)
- Sōma Saitō as Hiura Kirina (Valentin Eisner)
- Mizushima Takahiro as Kiyama Tatsuya (Hunter Foster)
- Sakurai Takahiro as Mansaku Yuuichirou (Trevor Cook)
- Hikida Takashi as Saginuma Osamu (Dave Quagmire)
- Tomohiro Oomachi as Ichihoshi Mitsuru/Hikaru (Philip/Lucas Star)
- Toshiki Masuda as Kira Hiroto (Xavier Schiller)
- Yuichi Nakamura as Zhao Jinyun (Mister Yi)
- Yuka Nishigaki as Kazemaru Ichirouta (Nathan Swift)
- Yūki Kaji as Fudou Akio (Caleb Stonewall)

== Music ==
- Opening 1: "Butai wa Dekkai Hou ga Ii! (舞台はデッカイほうがいい！)" by Pugcat's (From ep 1 to ep 21)
- Opening 2: "Chikyuu wo Kick! (地球をキック！)" by Pugcat's (From ep 22 to ep 49)
- Ending 1: "Suisei Girls (彗星ガールズ, Suisei Gaaruzu)" by Alom (From ep 1 to ep 21)
- Ending 2: "Summer Zombie (サマーゾンビ)" by Alom (From ep 22 to 36)
- Ending 3: "Ashita e no Bye Bye (明日あしたへのBye Bye)" by Urashima Sakatasen (From ep 37 to ep 49)

== Episode list ==
No.	English title (Translated title)	Original release date
1	"Gate to the World"; Transliteration: "Sekai e no Mon" (Japanese: 世界への門)	October 5, 2018
The day has finally arrived and the players who are going to represent Inazuma Japan have been selected (Mark, Jude, Xavier, Adriano, Trevor, Sonny, Eliot, Axel, Dave Quagmire, Heath, Dusk, Nathan, etc) and Heath Moore leaves to America to have his operation. All players who were selected played in the Football Frontier aside from one player, Ichihoshi Mitsuru, who came from Russia. All the players were later introduced to their coaches and managers but they also met Clario Orvan and Mutekigahara Fujimaru who showed that their plays aren't enough yet to face the world. Are they able to win their first match?
2	"The Lost Final Weapon"; Transliteration: "Ushinawareta Saishū Heiki" (Japanese: 失われた最終兵器)	October 12, 2018
Inazuma Japan start their first Football Frontier International match against South Korea's team, Red Bison. Both teams use some hissatsu to be the first one to score their first goal. However, Red Bison are able to get the first goal after obstructing Endou Mamoru's view. Are Inazuma Japan's plays enough to get back in the match and to tie the score or gain the upper hand before the first half ends?
3	"Those With the Mark"; Transliteration: "Kokuin o Motsu Mono" (Japanese: 刻印を持つ者)	October 19, 2018
With Gouenji Shuuya being injured for Inazuma Japan, Kira Hiroto replaces him and the rivalry between Hiroto and Haizaki Ryouhei begins. Despite their rivalry, Hiroto and Haizaki still manage to bring the ball up their way and Inamori Asuto scores the second goal for Inazuma Japan after picking up the loose ball. However, quickly after Inazuma Japan's goal, Red Bison counterattacks and they manage to score their second goal as well, tying the score 2-2. After seeing his plays, Seok Min-Woo approaches Baek Shi-Woo and sees something on his shoulder when he pulls his shirt down. What does he see and which team will win the match?
4	"Laughing Ichihoshi"; Transliteration: "Warau Ichihoshi" (Japanese: 笑う一星)	October 26, 2018
Inazuma Japan are training for the upcoming match against Australia but they have no info on the team, so they have no idea what kind of plays Australia has. Some are training in groups, some in pairs and others on their own. While the others are training, Kidou Yuuto goes to Zhao Jin Yun to ask if something is up with the tournament as well as some background info of Ichihoshi Mitsuru but with no success. Endou Mamoru and Ichihoshi are training with each other but the last ball Ichihoshi kicks, a spike appears out of the ball and Endou manages to dodge it thanks to Kidou's warning. What is Ichihoshi up to?
5	"The Wooden Horse of Troy"; Transliteration: "Toroi no Mokuba" (Japanese: トロイの木馬)	November 2, 2018
Inazuma Japan start their match against Australia, but they're having trouble keeping up with Australia's plays. Australia quickly score two goals since Endou Mamoru isn't able to block Satan Gaul's technique, Time Trance, with Fuujin Raijin. However, someone appears who has been away for a while, can she help Inazuma Japan?
6	"Kido's Counterattack"; Transliteration: "Kidō no Hangeki" (Japanese: 鬼道の反撃)	November 9, 2018
The match between Inazuma Japan and Australia continues with the second half. Seeing that Ichihoshi Mitsuru is trying to make Inazuma Japan lose, Kidou Yuuto decides to eliminate him with the help of Haizaki Ryouhei and Kira Hiroto. The duo deliver some blows to Ichihoshi but despite this, Inazuma Japan is still behind and Endou Mamoru is still unable to stop Satan Gaul's Time Trance while he can see timing of the technique. Can Inazuma Japan turn the match around and will Endou be able to stop Satan's Time Trance?
7	"The Planned Trap"; Transliteration: "Shikumareta Wana" (Japanese: 仕組まれた罠)	November 16, 2018
The match between Inazuma Japan and Shining Satans finally comes to an end with Haizaki Ryouhei and Kira Hiroto scoring the winning goal with Penguin The God & Devil, the score being 5-4. However, when the team celebrates their victory, one of their teammates are accused of doping. How will the team react on this?
8	"Inazuma Japan's Greatest Crisis"; Transliteration: "Inazuma Japan Saidai no Kiki"	November 30, 2018
Inazuma Japan start training for their next match against Uzbekistan's team, Eternal Dancers. However, before the match begins, Endou Mamoru gets arrested when he is confronted by some people. Now Inazuma Japan has to start and win the match without their captain and main goalkeeper. How will Inazuma Japan do this?
9	"The Emperor's Return"; Transliteration: "Kōtei no Kikan" (Japanese: 皇帝の帰還)	December 14, 2018
Nosaka Yuuma is finally back with the team after his brain surgery and is the captain for Inazuma Japan during the second half of the match between Inazuma Japan and Eternal Dancers. With Nosaka back, Inazuma Japan's plays are much better than during the first half because Nosaka ordering everyone what to do or where to stand. Although Nosaka just had his brain surgery, he still manages to make his plays. Who did he meet in the hospital and will Inazuma Japan score some goals now Nosaka is back?
10	"The Emperor's Counterattack"; Transliteration: "Kōtei no Gyakushū" (Japanese: 皇帝の逆襲)	December 21, 2018
Inazuma Japan manages to win the match against Eternal Dancers with a score of 4-2, however after the match Ichihoshi Mitsuru tries to accuse Nosaka of doping as he did to Kidou Yuuto However, Nosaka outsmarts Ichihoshi by switch the drugs he planted with something else. Endou Mamoru is also released from the police station and Kimura Yousuke approaches him, wanting to talk to him about Ichihoshi. Endou later tells his team what he hard from Kimura about Ichihoshi with Iwato Takashi revealing something as well. What will Endou and Iwato tell to the team about Ichihoshi?
11	"The Emperor's Scenario"; Transliteration: "Kōtei no Shinario" (Japanese: 皇帝のシナリオ)	December 28, 2018
Inazuma Japan prepare for their next match against Saudi Arabia with Nosaka Yuuma showing the team the training. While the team is training, Ichihoshi Mitsuru gets pressured by Girikanan to eliminate them. However, Ichihoshi doesn't really want to do it since it reminds him of the accident he had several years ago. He ends up not doing it and decides to take out the players during the match with the help of the Saudi Arabia players. How will Inazuma Japan prevent this and win the match at the same time?
12	"Ichihoshi, The Last Choice"; Transliteration: "Ichihoshi, Saigo no Sentaku" (Japanese: 一星、最後の選択)	January 11, 2019
Ichihoshi is torn between saving his brother and playing soccer as he wants to do. This debate is getting even stronger after he receives a pass from Asuto, who trusts him to do well. However, then he gets a new order of destroying Nosaka. Even though he wants to save his brother, his feeling to play normal soccer grows stronger. Will Ichihoshi decide to follow the Orion Foundation's orders or play soccer for fun?
13	"Japan, A New Brilliance"; Transliteration: "Japan, Aratana Kagayaki" (Japanese: ジャパン、新たな輝き)	January 18, 2019
The first half between Inazuma Japan and Saudi Arabia ended with a score of 1-0. Ichihoshi Mitsuru is still torn between saving his brother and playing soccer as he wants to do. Inazuma Japan tries to help Ichihoshi but it doesn't really work. Zhao Jinyun then reveals that Ichihoshi didn't have a brother in the hospital since Kidou Yuuto has waited all day but nobody came to the room where Ichihoshi's brother was supposed to be in. Zhao also reveals that his brother died with his father in the accident, making Ichihoshi more confused. The second half is about to start and Inazuma Japan decide to let Ichihoshi play despite his condition. Can Ichihoshi pull through and find his true self?
14	"Glittering☆Soccer Boy"; Transliteration: "Kirakira☆Sakkā Bōi" (Japanese: キラキラ☆サッカーボーイ)	January 25, 2019
Kimura Yousuke interviews Inamori Asuto, Haizaki Ryouhei, and Nosaka Yuuma.
15	"Zhao Jin Yun's Apprentice"; Transliteration: "Chō Kin Un no Deshi" (Japanese: 趙金雲の弟子)	February 1, 2019
The Asian finals are coming and Inazuma Japan will face China's team. Zhao Jinyun told the members Li Kobun had to leave them for having an incident in his family, but Hiura Kirina revealed his real identity, which he knew because he had seen him without his mask on before. Li Hao then told his story about how he met Zhao Jinyun six years ago, when he was eight. After Zhao caught him trying to steal his wallet, he brought him to a place where he could eat and Hao revealed he was an orphan boy who left the orphanage because he didn't like the people there and decided to leave on the streets. Zhao gathered other street rats and started to train them for becoming a soccer team, but mainly to show them how to live an honest life. After he decided that they didn't need him anymore, he left them, saying that living an honest life would bring them something better in the end. The street rats managed to thrive on their own just fine, because they managed to go to the finals in the Chinese Tournament with their team, Rojiura Shounentai. They saw that their opponent team, Shanghai Hoshinekodan, was trained by no one but Zhao Jinyun. The match ended in a tie, with a score of 2-2.
16	"I'm in the Team"; Transliteration: "Ore wa Chīmu no Naka ni" (Japanese: 俺はチームの中に)	February 8, 2019
Ichihoshi Hikaru feels guilty for what he has done to the team when he thought he was Ichihoshi Mitsuru and helps the team in every way he can, so they can forgive him. Inamori Asuto sees what Ichihoshi is doing and decides to invite him to go to Mount Fuji's forest in the middle of the night. However, they get lost and they didn't tell their teammates where they went. Will they be able to find their way back and will their teammates look for them?
17	"The Surprising Triple Keeper"; Transliteration: "Kyōgaku no Toripuru Kīpā" (Japanese: 驚愕のトリプルキーパー)	February 15, 2019
Inazuma Japan start their match against China's national team, Soccer Acrobatic Troupe but without their coach since he is absent, making Kudou Michiya the main coach for the match. Inazuma Japan's players are struggling against the plays of Soccer Acrobatic Troupe and Endou Mamoru's Fuujin Raijin Ghost is broken by Li Hao's Tenkuu Hayabusadan. Kudou then makes the decision to substitute both the reserve goalkeepers, Nishikage Seiya and Saginuma Osamu with the latter making his debut, as defenders. Now with all the three goalkeepers on the field, how will they stop Li Hao's Tenkuu Hayabusadan?
18	"Gojin Stands on the Field"; Transliteration: "Gōjin, Fīrudo ni Tatsu" (Japanese: 剛陣、フィールドに立つ)	February 22, 2019
Inazuma Japan continue their match against Soccer Acrobatic Troupe. With the help of Nishikage Seiya and Saginuma Osamu, Endou Mamoru is now able to stop Li Hao's Tenkuu Hayabusadan with their combination technique, The Asura. However, Inazuma Japan now struggle with scoring goals since Soccer Acrobatic Troupe stop all their techniques. Kudou Michiya then decides to let Goujin Tetsunosuke play, who makes his debut for the team. Can he help the team out?
19	"Aim for the Big Stage!"; Transliteration: "Mezase, Daibutai!" (Japanese: 目指せ、大舞台！)	March 1, 2019
The end of the match is slowly approaching and Inazuma Japan are having a difficult time scoring against Soccer Acrobatic Troupe while they are also having a difficult time scoring. Soccer Acrobatic Troupe reveal some more tactics to get past Inazuma Japan's players but thanks to Nosaka Yuuma and Ichihoshi Hikaru, they later counter the tactics with their own new tactic, The General. Inazuma Japan manage to score the tying goal with Fudou Akio's Maximum Circus but the final minutes of the Asia finals match are almost over. Who will win this match?
20	"A Party for a New Journey"; Transliteration: "Aratanaru Tabidachi no Utage" (Japanese: 新たなる旅立ちの宴)	March 8, 2019
After winning the FFI prelims, Inazuma Japan is invited aboard a ship for a luxury dinner party. Much to their surprise, Clario Orvan and a few other members of Barcelona Orb are also at the party. At that time, the drawings of team matches for the FFI are live on TV, and Japan's first rival is Spain. Could the Orion Foundation be responsible for this?
21	"Thinking About Feelings Toward the Sea"; Transliteration: "Taikai e no Omoi o Hasete" (Japanese: 大海への想いを馳せて)	March 15, 2019
Before departing to Russia for the Football Frontier International, Inazuma Japan's members visit their respective schools to meet their friends and family to see them. Fubuki Shirou meets his brother, Fubuki Atsuya, and he reveals that Shirou has a leg injury, making him unable to participate in the tournament. Endou Mamoru, Gouenji Shuuya and Kidou Yuuto meet each other at the Steel Tower Plaza where Kidou says that he won't go with them to Russia, planning to stay behind in Japan to select new members for Inazuma Japan. Later that day, Inamori Asuto reads his letter and then sees Shinjou Takuma who wants to talk to him. What does Shinjou want to talk about with Asuto?
22	"Viva! Above the World"; Transliteration: "Biba! Sekai Jōkū" (Japanese: ビバ！世界上空)	March 22, 2019
Inazuma Japan are travelling to Russia by plane and each member does something to make the time pass by quickly. When they arrive in Russia, they meet Spain's team, Invincible Giant, America's team, Star Unicorn, and Russia's team, Perfect Spark. The teams suspect that every member of Russia is a Disciple of Orion but then Froy Girikanan gives an answer that surprises them.
23	"The World's Wall"; Transliteration: "Sekai no Kabe" (Japanese: 世界の壁)	March 29, 2019
( Most of the episode is a rerun of Inazuma Eleven Reloaded.)
24	"Let's Walk in Russia"; Transliteration: "Roshia o Arukō" (Japanese: ロシアを歩こう)	April 5, 2019
Inazuma Japan have some time before their first match, so they decide to explore Russia. Some of the players participate in an eating competition with Clario Orvan joining them as well while Ichihoshi Hikaru meets Froy Girikanan to talk about the Orion Foundation. After spending their time in Russia, the team go back to train with Inamori Asuto, Haizaki Ryouhei and Nosaka Yuuma being selected to inherit Gouenji Shuuya's Last Resort. Then suddenly, someone uses a technique to get the attention of the team. Who is it?
25	"The Obstructing Giant God"; Transliteration: "Tachihadakaru Kyoshin" (Japanese: 立ちはだかる巨神)	April 12, 2019
Starting off the Football Frontier International in Russia, Inazuma Japan go up against Invincible Giant. With Fubuki Atsuya being the first additional member for Inazuma Japan, he is also starting against Spain, replacing Kira Hiroto for the forward position. However, Inazuma Japan are struggling against Invincible Giant with Clario Orvan quickly scoring the first goal for his team even though Endou Mamoru has a new technique called Super God Hand. How will Inazuma Japan counter?
26	"The General's Glimmer"; Transliteration: "Jeneraru no Kirameki" (Japanese: ジェネラルの煌めき)	April 19, 2019
27	"Asuto! Run Towards Victory!"; Transliteration: "Asuto! Shōri ni Mukatte Hashire!" (Japanese: 明日人！勝利に向かって走れ！)	April 26, 2019
Inazuma Japan continue their match against Invincible Giant but they are having a hard time keeping up with Spain, who made their third goal with Twin Lancer. Inazuma Japan try to score another goal with Last Resort but Nosaka Yuuma sees that's still incomplete, so it gets easily stopped by Spain's defense. They then decide to depend on Inamori Asuto to get through Spain's players. Can Asuto turn the match around?
28	"Ichinose Sinks in a Coup d'état" Transliteration: "Ichinose, Kūdetā ni Shizumu" (Japanese: 一之瀬、クーデターに沈む)	May 3, 2019
29	"Aphrodi Descends"; Transliteration: "Afurodi Kōrin" (Japanese: アフロディ降臨)	May 10, 2019
30	"The Eye of God"; Transliteration: "Kami no Me" (Japanese: 神の目)	May 17, 2019
Inazuma Japan are about to start their match against Navy Invader but Inamori Asuto is running late since he is still talking to Inamori Masato, his dad. Asuto arrives on time in the stadium and Inazuma Japan starts their match with Aphrodi making his debut. Inazuma Japan quickly attempt to score with Fudou Akio using Maximum Circus but Bigman blocks it with Gunji Eisei Phobos. Navy Invader counterattack and they score instead with Carronade Hou breaking through Endou Mamoru's Diamond Hand. Like they did with Star Unicorn, Navy Invader start to injure Inazuma Japan's players. How will Inazuma Japan continue the match and what can Aphrodi do for the team?
31	"Air on the GGG String"; Transliteration: "GGG Senjō no Aria" (Japanese: GGG線上のアリア)	May 24, 2019
32	"Revive! Phoenix"; Transliteration: "Yomigaere! Fenikkusu" (Japanese: 甦れ！フェニックス)	May 31, 2019
Inazuma Japan continue their match against Navy Invader with Domon Asuka, Ichinose Kazuya and Mark Kruger, three players from Star Unicorn, joining Navy Invader. Inazuma Japan are still in the lead with a score of 3-2 but with the Star Unicorn trio, they block an attempt of Haizaki Ryouhei with Shark The Deep and score the tying goal with The Phoenix, breaking through Endou Mamoru's Diamond Hand. As time is slowly running out, Inazuma Japan struggle with scoring another goal. Will Inazuma Japan score the winning goal or will it end up in a tie like the match against Invincible Giant?
33	"Asuto's Disappearance"; Transliteration: "Kieta Asuto" (Japanese: 消えた明日人)	June 7, 2019
34	"The Shocking New Members"; Transliteration: "Shōgeki no Tsuika Menbā" (Japanese: 衝撃の追加メンバー)	June 14, 2019
The members of Inazuma Japan are worried about Inamori Asuto who has suddenly disappeared after he went with his father to an Orion facility. Despite that, two new members appear before Inazuma Japan and they look familiar to the players of Inakuni Raimon but they look different from their previous appearances. Who are they?
35	"Magnificent Froy"; Transliteration: "Karei na Furoi" (Japanese: 華麗なフロイ)	June 21, 2019
Inazuma Japan's last match in their group is about to begin against Perfect Spark but Inamori Asuto hasn't returned from his trip with his father. They decide to play the match without them and let Umihara Norika and Kozoumaru Sasuke make their debut for Inazuma Japan with Norika being the goalkeeper and Kozoumaru one of the two forwards. Inazuma Japan struggle against Perfect Spark with Froy Girikanan quickly scoring the first goal. What can the two new members do to turn the match more into their favor?
36	"Lonely Froy"; Transliteration: "Kodoku na Furoi" (Japanese: 孤独なフロイ)	June 28, 2019
37	"The Warrior with the Black Bandanna"; Transliteration: "Kuroi Bandana no Senshi" (Japanese: 黒いバンダナの戦士)	July 5, 2019
Inazuma Japan is still playing a match against Perfect Spark but Perfect Spark is down two players after Froy Girikanan and Viktor Sedov left their team. They replace them with Malik Kuabel, a player Inamori Asuto met in the Orion training facility, and someone who has his eyes covered with a black bandanna. The match continues but some players of Inazuma Japan notice the movements and techniques the player with the black bandanna makes is very similar to someone they know very well. Is it really him and what did Orion do to him?
38	"The Truth About Orion"; Transliteration: "Orion no Shinjitsu" (Japanese: オリオンの真実)	July 12, 2019
39	"The Arrow of Artemis"; Transliteration: "Arutemisu no Ya" (Japanese: アルテミスの矢)	July 19, 2019
40	"Older Brother and Younger Brother"; Transliteration: "Ani to Otōto" (Japanese: 兄と弟)	July 26, 2019
41	"The Passionate Guys are Here"; Transliteration: "Atsui Yatsura ga Kita" (Japanese: アツい奴らが来た)	August 2, 2019
42	"Under the Small Sky"; Transliteration: "Chīsana Sora no Shita" (Japanese: 小さな空の下)	August 9, 2019
43	"Let's Do That Soccer"; Transliteration: "Ano Sakkā o Yarō" (Japanese: あのサッカーをやろう)	August 16, 2019
44	"The Witch's Army"; Transliteration: "Majo no Gundan" (Japanese: 魔女の軍団)	August 23, 2019
The semi-final match between Inazuma Japan and the Italy national team, Guardians of Queen, is about to start. Guardians of Queen are under direct control of Irina Girikanan and wear mysterious supporters on their arms and legs that increases the strength of their movements and techniques. Because of that, Inazuma Japan struggle against them and are quickly behind with a score of 0-2. How will Inazuma Japan turn this match around?
45	"Poison Apple Equation"; Transliteration: "Doku Ringo no Hōteishiki" (Japanese: 毒リンゴの方程式)	August 30, 2019
46	"Roar! Last Resort"; Transliteration: "Hoero! Rasuto Rizōto" (Japanese: 吠えろ！ラストリゾート)	September 6, 2019
Inazuma Japan continue their match against Guardians of Queen but the score isn't in favor for Inazuma Japan, being 1-3. Norika, Aphrodi, and Saginuma were injured by Grid Omega and replaced by Endou, Kozoumaru, and Gouenji, who plays a match again after being injured for a long time. Inazuma Japan still struggle against Guardians of Queen due to the supporters they are wearing. Seeing no other option, Gouenji wants to use Last Resort despite being incomplete by Asuto, Haizaki and Nosaka. Can they still complete Last Resort in time and win this match?
47	"It Began on the Day of the Final Battle"; Transliteration: "Saishū Kessen no Hi Sore wa Hajimatta" (Japanese: 最終決戦の日 それは始まった)	September 13, 2019
48	"Hold Hands Across the World"; Transliteration: "Sekai yo Sono Te o Tsunage" (Japanese: 世界よ その手をつなげ)	September 20, 2019
The match between Perfect Spark and Inazuma Japan comes to a halt as Irina threatens to bomb the stadium & kill everyone inside, unless the various countries of the world agree to pay a ransom. The ultimate Orion team, Shadow of Orion, appears, prompting the assembly of Zhao Jinyuns, a new team to confront them consisting of players from different national teams.
49	"Tomorrow Comes Beyond the Field"; Transliteration: "Fīrudo no Mukō ni Ashita ga Kuru" (Japanese: フィールドの向こうに明日が来る)	September 27, 2019
Zhao Jinyuns continue their fight against the Shadow of Orion. Yurika tried to score again with Black Field but failed, after Endou uses his Yuujou no God Hand. Everyone's motivated after seeing Endou successfully catches Black Field. Even they are behind by the score of 0-3, they managed to catch up after Ichinose Kazuya, Haizaki Ryouhei, and Clario Orvan scored with Perseus Orb. After seeing that Zhao Jinyuns scored against them, Yurika can't believe to what's happening to them. She tried to score with Orion Crossviper, but Endou blocks it again with Super Megaton Head. Gouenji, Kidou and Endou dashes towards the field and they scored with Inazuma Break Code Great. Lus Kasim, Li Hao and Malik Kuabel then tied the score using Sword of d'Artagnan. Asuto convinces Yurika that whether she loses or not she is still here. Froy, Ichihoshi, Nosaka, Haizaki and Asuto shared their feelings that because of soccer they had friends that support them. The five made shoot chains using Innocent Drive, Planet Break, Gekkoumaru Tsubame Gaeshi, Shark the Deep and Sunrise Blitz scoring the final and winning goal for Zhao Jinyuns. Everything became dark but Endou told everyone to play soccer then all of them kick the balls upwards with blue aura, after that sun starts to shine and everyone was happy that soccer bounds all of them together. Everyone then left their separate ways and rejoined their old teams. Inakuni Raimon came back to Inakunijima, Ichihoshi joined Outei Tsukinomiya and the Original Raimon is back again. The Football Frontier started and it is Raimon against Inakuni, Inakuni goes for the kickoff and the crowd cheered them all.
