= Nishino (novel series) =

Japanese light novel series

- Nishino: Gakunai Caste Saikai ni shite Inou Sekai Saikyō no Shōnen
- First light novel volume cover

西野 ～学内カースト最下位にして異能世界最強の少年～
- Novel series

Tales of Nishino
- Written by: Buncololi
- Published by: Shōsetsuka ni Narō; Kakuyomu
- Original run: April 29, 2017 – present
- Light novel
- Written by: Buncololi
- Illustrated by: Matanonki
- Published by: Media Factory
- Imprint: MF Bunko J
- Original run: April 25, 2018 – November 25, 2025
- Volumes: 14 + 1
- Manga
- Written by: Buncololi
- Illustrated by: Shinome Shinohara
- Published by: Media Factory
- Imprint: MF Comics Alive Series
- Magazine: Monthly Comic Alive
- Original run: March 27, 2019 – May 27, 2020
- Volumes: 3

Nishino: Gakunai Caste Saikai ni shite Inou Sekai Saikyō no Shōnen (西野 ～学内カースト最下位にして異能世界最強の少年～) is a Japanese light novel series written by Buncololi and illustrated by Matanonki. It was originally posted as a web novel on the online publishing platform Shōsetsuka ni Narō, before being relaunched in Kadokawa Corporation's Kakuyomu online platform in April 2017. Media Factory began publishing it as a light novel under their MF Bunko J imprint the following year, with 14 volumes published between April 2018 and January 2024; a short story collection featuring an epilogue was released in November 2025. A manga adaptation illustrated by Shinome Shinohara was serialized in Media Factory's Monthly Comic Alive magazine from March 2019 to May 2020, with its chapters compiled into three volumes between August 2019 and July 2020.

== Plot ==
The series follows Gokyō Nishino, a high school student, who ranks low in the school hierarchy due to his plain appearance and personality. Despite his unpopularity, he wishes to have a fulfilling high school life. He is secretly an agent named "Normal", known for his skill in supernatural powers. Becoming frustrated with his life, upon entering his second year of high school, he decides to use his powers to climb up the school hierarchy and become more popular. However, circumstances mean that his efforts usually fail.

== Characters ==
Gokyō Nishino (西野 五郷, Nishino Gokyō)
Voiced by: Hiroyuki Kagura (audio drama)
A high school student, who is a loner at school and is the object of disdain by others. Despite his appearance and lack of popularity, he is actually skilled in supernatural powers.
Rose Rebmann (ローズ・レープマン, Rōzu Rēpuman)
Voiced by: Ayasa Itō (audio drama)
A blonde-haired student who transferred to the school a few months prior to the start of the story. She also works as an agent. She has the ability to regenerate.
Takekuchi (竹内)
Voiced by: Nobunaga Shimazaki (audio drama)
Nishino's classmate, whose handsome appearance make him among the most popular students in school.
Chikako Shimizu (志水 千佳子, Shimizu Chikako)
Voiced by: Yuki Nakashima (audio drama)
The class representative of Nishino's class.
Matsuura (松浦)
One of Nishino's classmates, who has a quiet personality. He has a fondness for her archetype.
Tarōsuke (太郎助)
A popular guitarist who was once saved by Nishino.
Marquis (マーキス, Mākisu)
Voiced by: Yoshinobu Sena (audio drama)
The bartender at the bar Nishino frequents. He has many contacts with agents and others, allowing him to help Nishino out with his activities.
Francisca (フランシスカ, Furanshisuka)
Voiced by: Kanon Komachi (audio drama)
Rose's boss. She has blonde hair and has a glamorous appearance.
Risa (リサ)
Voiced by: Larissa Tago Takeda (audio drama)
A high school student who had been the most popular girl in class before Rose's transfer.
Gabriela (ガブリエラ)
Voiced by: Nanaka Suwa (audio drama)
A mysterious silver-haired girl who works as a freelance agent.

== Development ==
Buncololi wrote the series with the intention of portraying a protagonist that was different from the usual handsome or cool-looking heroes in light novels. They noted that, although many light novel protagonists were ordinary high school students, in practice, they often did not depict them as ordinary. They thought that portraying Nishino as an actual ordinary-looking person would make him be more relatable to readers. He noted the contrast between Nishino's poor reputation in school with his renown as an agent. He wanted to limit the number of characters in the story, making sure that even characters initially introduced as seemingly minor characters would play a larger role in the plot.

== Media ==
=== Web novel ===
Buncololi originally posted the series as a web novel on the online publishing platform Shōsetsuka ni Narō. However, they discontinued updating it to focus on their series Atelier Tanaka. They relaunched the series on Kadokawa Corporation's online platform Kakuyomu on April 29, 2017, under the title Tales of Nishino (テイルズ・オブ・西野).

=== Light novel ===
The light novels are published by Media Factory under their MF Bunko J imprint. The first volume was released on April 25, 2018. Fourteen volumes were published, with the last one releasing on January 25, 2024. A short story collection featuring an epilogue for the series was released on November 25, 2025.

No.	Japanese release date	Japanese ISBN
1	April 25, 2018	978-4-04-069859-5
2	May 25, 2018	978-4-04-069918-9
3	September 25, 2018	978-4-04-065164-4
4	December 25, 2018	978-4-04-065242-9
5	April 25, 2019	978-4-04-065671-7
6	August 24, 2019	978-4-04-065862-9
7	December 25, 2019	978-4-04-064264-2
8	April 25, 2020	978-4-04-064592-6
9	August 25, 2020	978-4-04-064873-6
10	December 25, 2020	978-4-04-680079-4
11	June 25, 2021	978-4-04-680395-5
12	December 24, 2021	978-4-04-681002-1
13	November 25, 2022	978-4-04-681661-0
14	January 25, 2024	978-4-04-683236-8
SS	November 25, 2025	978-4-04-685291-5

=== Manga ===
A manga adaptation illustrated by Shinome Shinohara was serialized in Media Factory's Monthly Comic Alive magazine from March 27, 2019, to May 27, 2020. Its chapters were compiled into three tankōbon volumes between August 23, 2019, and July 20, 2020.

No.	Japanese release date	Japanese ISBN
1	August 23, 2019	978-4-04-065870-4
2	February 21, 2020	978-4-04-064366-3
3	July 20, 2020	978-4-04-064791-3

=== Other media ===
An audio drama produced by Cucuri was released in April 2019, coinciding with the release of the fifth light novel volume.

== Reception ==
The series was cited in the 2019 edition of Kono Light Novel ga Sugoi!, placing 6th in the Paperback category. The series ranked 2nd in the Paperback category in a 2019 public vote by Kadokawa's BookWalker service on promising new light novels.

Takumi Higashimono, writing for Da Vinci News, described the series as The Irregular at Magic High School where the protagonist is not handsome. He noted how, in contrast to other works featuring loner protagonists, in Nishino, the protagonist is not only disliked and unhappy but is also the target of disdain by others. Higashimono contrasted Nishino with Hachiman Hikigaya from My Youth Romantic Comedy Is Wrong, As I Expected, noting how Hachiman is depicted as a bad-tempered protagonist who nevertheless is easy to empathize with, while it was more difficult to sympathize with Nishino due to how he is treated by the other characters.

== See also ==
- Sasaki and Peeps, another light novel series written by Buncololi
