= Junko Takeuchi =

Japanese actress (born 1972)

- 竹内 順子
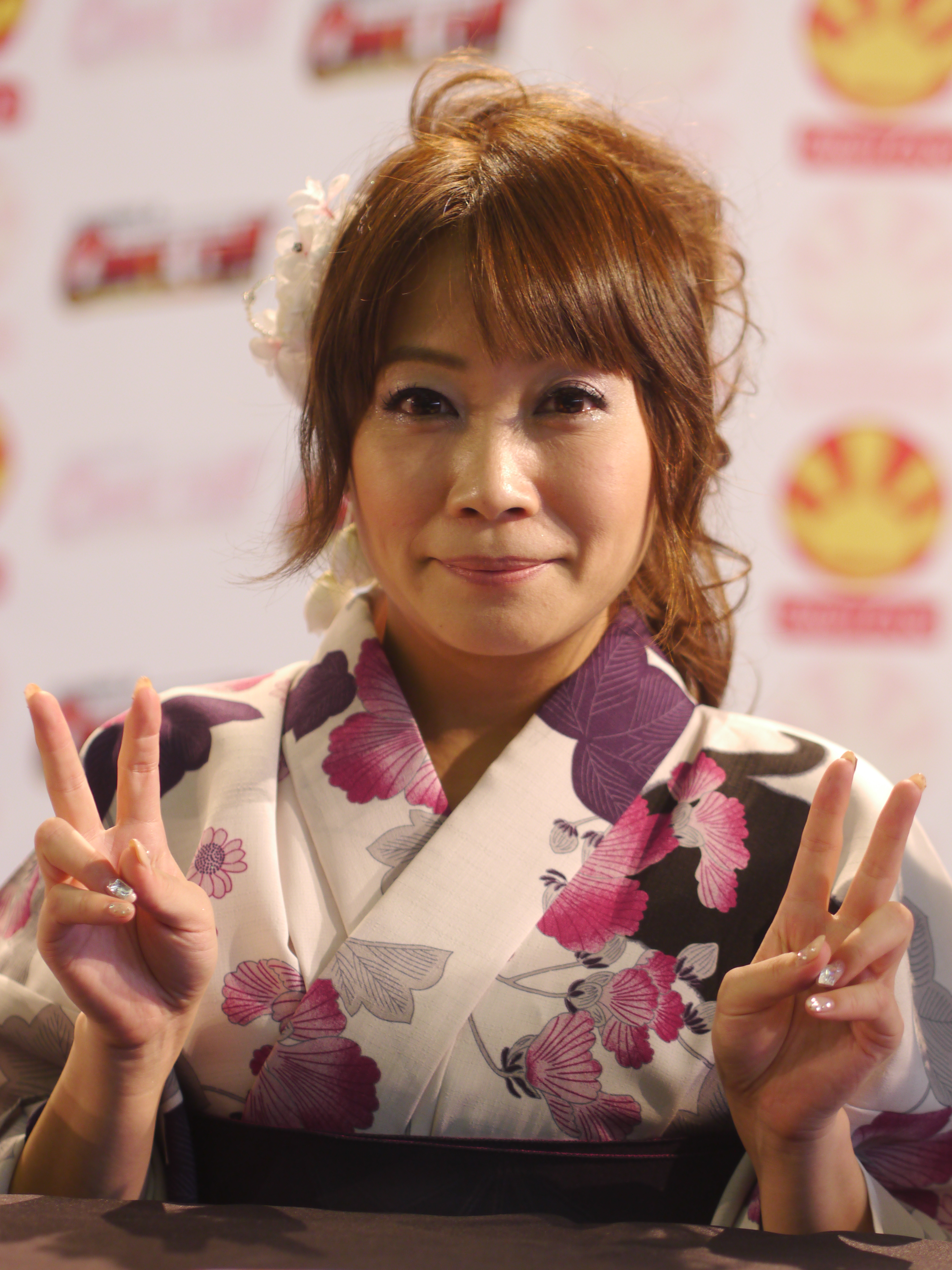
- Takeuchi in 2013
- Born: April 5, 1972 (age 54); Saitama Prefecture, Japan
- Occupations: Actress; voice actress
- Years active: 1996–present
- Agent: OgiPro The Next
- Notable work: Naruto as Naruto Uzumaki; Inazuma Eleven and Inazuma Eleven GO as Mamoru Endō/Mark Evans
- Height: 151 cm (4 ft 11 in)
- Spouse: Kenji Hamada (m. 2006)
- Children: 2

Junko Takeuchi (竹内 順子, Takeuchi Junko; born April 5, 1972) is a Japanese actress and voice actress employed by Ogipro The Next. Taking a well-trod path by many voice actresses, she often voices young male characters, with generally very quirky and goofy personalities. One of her most well-known roles includes Naruto Uzumaki in the popular anime series Naruto. She has played Takuya Kanbara in Digimon Frontier, Rin Natsuki/Cure Rouge in Yes! PreCure 5, Metabee in Medabots, Mamoru Endō in Inazuma Eleven and Inazuma Eleven GO, Gon Freecss in the 1999 version of Hunter × Hunter, MrBeast in the Japanese dub of MrBeast, and GingerBrave in the Japanese dub of Cookie Run: Kingdom.

== Personal life ==
She is the youngest of three children. As a child she studied ballet and piano for seven and a half years. She enrolled in 1991 at Nihon University, College of Art but dropped out two years later. For several years she worked as a shoe salesperson and gave piano lessons at a private school in Tokyo. Originally she wanted to work in a bank office. In 1996 she joined BQ MAP Theater Company where she had several stage appearances. She met voice actor Kenji Hamada in 1999. They married in 2006. Their first child was born in 2012 and the other one in 2017.

== Filmography ==
=== Anime ===
Year	Title	Role
1997	Rurouni Kenshin	Honjō Kamatari
1997	Photon	Photon Earth
1998	Beast Wars II: Super Life-Form Transformers	Moon
1999	Super Life-Form Transformers: Beast Wars Neo	Break
1999	Digimon Adventure	Gomamon
1999	Hunter × Hunter (1999)	Gon Freecss
1999	Medabots	Metabee
2000	Digimon Adventure 02	Gomamon
2000	Medabots Damashii	Metabee
2000	Yu-Gi-Oh! Duel Monsters	Mokuba Kaiba
2001	Dennō Bōkenki Webdiver	Naoki
2001	Mōtto! Ojamajo Doremi	Masato Rinno, Kimitaka
2001	Read or Die	Fabre
2001	Ask Dr. Rin!	Yue Konishi, Tenshin
2001	Captain Tsubasa	Takeshi Sawada (young), Hajime Taki (young)
2002–07	Naruto	Naruto Uzumaki, Akamaru
2002	Digimon Frontier	Takuya Kanbara
2002	Hanada Shōnen-shi	Hanada Tokuko
2003	Zatch Bell!	Maruss, Ted
2004	Monster	Dieter
2004	Kakurenbo	Hikora
2004	Major	Okamura Trio
2004	Bird of Fire	Nagi
2005–09	Onegai My Melody	Kuromi, My Sweet Piano
2005	Absolute Boy	Wakkun
2006	PreCure Splash Star	Kenta Hoshino
2006	Princess Princess	Kei, Megumi Yoshikawa
2006	Ouran High School Host Club	Shiro Takaouji
2006	Saru Get You -On Air-	Satoru
2006	Yonna in the Solitary Fortress	Piggott
2006	Katekyo Hitman Reborn!	Lambo
2007–17	Naruto: Shippuden	Naruto Uzumaki, Akamaru
2007	Yes! PreCure 5	Rin Natsuki, Cure Rouge (Speaking Voice)
2007	Claymore	Noel
2007	Gintama	Daigoro Kitaouji
2007	Sisters of Wellber	Tina Lawter
2008–11	Inazuma Eleven	Mamoru Endō, Harano Tooru
2008	Kyo Kara Maoh!	Lindsey von Wincott
2009	Zoku Natsume Yūjin-Chō	Ishio Kai
2009	Jewelpet	Toor, Tata, Lapis, Mint
2009	Tamagotchi!	Kikitchi
2010	Digimon Xros Wars	Takuya Kanbara, Gomamon
2010	One Piece	Sabo (young)
2011–14	Inazuma Eleven GO series	Mamoru Endō, Kaizu Kouichirou, Mecha Endō, Sync, Hamusu
2012	Rock Lee & His Ninja Pals	Naruto Uzumaki
2013	Pocket Monsters: The Origin	Red
2015	Kyokai no RINNE	Youta
2015	Digimon Adventure tri.	Gomamon
2016	Nyanbo!	Mike
2016	Kamiwaza Wanda	Mighty
2017	Little Witch Academia	Croix Meridies
2017–23	Boruto: Naruto Next Generations	Naruto Uzumaki
2017–18	Beyblade Burst God	Cuza Ackermann
2018	After the Rain	Yuto Kondo
2018	Inazuma Eleven: Ares	Mamoru Endō
2018–19	Inazuma Eleven: Orion no Kokuin	Mamoru Endō
2019	Pocket Monsters: Sun & Moon	Hapu
2019	Dororo	Sukeroku
2020	Digimon Adventure:	Gomamon
2021	Mazica Party	Barunya
2021	I'm Standing on a Million Lives 2nd Season	Game Master
2022	Welcome to Demon School! Iruma-kun Season 3	Barbatos Bachiko
2023–24	Kuromi's Pretty Journey	Kuromi
2023	Power of Hope: PreCure Full Bloom	Rin Natsuki, Kenta Hoshino
2024	Haigakura	Ichiyō (young)
2025	My Melody & Kuromi	Kuromi, My Sweet Piano
2026	Jujutsu Kaisen	Hanyu

=== Film ===
- Naruto the Movie: Ninja Clash in the Land of Snow (2004) – Naruto Uzumaki
- Naruto the Movie: Legend of the Stone of Gelel (2005) – Naruto Uzumaki
- Naruto the Movie: Guardians of the Crescent Moon Kingdom (2006) – Naruto Uzumaki
- Naruto Shippuden the Movie (2007) – Naruto Uzumaki
- Yes! PreCure 5 the Movie: Great Miraculous Adventure in the Mirror Kingdom! (2007) – Rin Natsuki/Cure Rouge
- Naruto Shippuden the Movie: Bonds (2008) – Naruto Uzumaki
- Yes! PreCure 5 GoGo! the Movie: Happy Birthday in the Sweets Kingdom (2008) – Rin Natsuki/Cure Rouge
- Tamagotchi: Happiest Story in the Universe! (2008) – Kikitchi
- Naruto Shippuden the Movie: The Will of Fire (2009) – Naruto Uzumaki
- Pretty Cure All Stars DX: Everyone's Friends - The Collection of Miracles! (2009) – Rin Natsuki/Cure Rouge
- Naruto Shippuden the Movie: The Lost Tower (2010) – Naruto Uzumaki
- Inazuma Eleven The Movie: The Final Force, The Ogre Team Strikes (2010) – Mamoru Endō
- Pretty Cure All Stars DX2: Light of Hope - Protect the Rainbow Jewel! (2010) – Rin Natsuki/Cure Rouge
- Naruto Shippuden the Movie: Blood Prison (2011) – Naruto Uzumaki
- Pretty Cure All Stars DX3: Deliver the Future! The Rainbow-Colored Flower That Connects the World (2011) – Rin Natsuki/Cure Rouge
- Onegai My Melody: Yu&Ai (2012) – Kuromi
- Road to Ninja: Naruto the Movie (2012) – Naruto Uzumaki
- Inazuma Eleven GO vs Danball Senki W (2012) – Mamoru Endō
- Pretty Cure All Stars New Stage 3: Eternal Friends (2014) – Rin Natsuki/Cure Rouge
- Inazuma Eleven Chou Jigen Dream Match (2014) – Mamoru Endō
- The Last: Naruto the Movie (2014) – Naruto Uzumaki
- Boruto: Naruto the Movie (2015) – Naruto Uzumaki
- Digimon Adventure: Last Evolution Kizuna (2020) – Gomamon
- Healin' Good Pretty Cure the Movie: GoGo! Big Transformation! The Town of Dreams (2021) – Rin Natsuki/Cure Rouge

=== Drama CDs ===
- Mainichi Seiten! – Mayumi Obinata
- Soul Eater – Maka Albarn
- The Day of Revolution – Kei/Megumi Yoshikawa
- Yours For An Hour – Haru Hinomoto

=== Tokusatsu ===
- Kamen Rider ZEZTZ - Oblivion Gore Nightmare

=== Video games ===
- Puzzle Star Sweep (1997) – Domingo
- Street Fighter Zero 3 (1998) – R. Mika
- Garou: Mark of the Wolves (1999) – Hokutomaru
- Hunter × Hunter: Altar of Dragon Vein (2001) – Gon Freecss
- Naruto video games (2003–present) – Naruto Uzumaki
- Radiata Stories (2005) – Jack Russell
- Ape Escape 3 (2005) – Satoru
- Quantum Leap Layzelber (2005) – Chyota
- Corpse Seed (2007) – Honoka Yamato
- Inazuma Eleven (2008) – Mamoru Endō
- Inazuma Eleven 2 (2009) – Mamoru Endō
- Inazuma Eleven 3 (2010) – Mamoru Endō, Kanon Endō
- Inazuma Eleven Strikers (2011) – Mamoru Endō, Kanon Endō
- Inazuma Eleven Strikers 2012 Xtreme (2011) – Mamoru Endō, Kanon Endō
- Inazuma Eleven GO (2011) – Mamoru Endō
- Inazuma Eleven GO 2: Chrono Stone (2012) – Mamoru Endō
- Inazuma Eleven GO: Galaxy (2013) – Mamoru Endō
- Yu-Gi-Oh! Duel Links (2016) – Mokuba Kaiba
- Onmyoji (2016) – Zashiki Warashi
- Yo-kai Watch: Wibble Wobble (2017-2019) – Kuromi, Mamoru Endō
- Fire Emblem Heroes (2019) – Louise, Lugh
- Inazuma Eleven SD (2020) – Mamoru Endō
- Cookie Run: Kingdom (2021) – GingerBrave
- Genshin Impact (2024) – Ajaw
- Inazuma Eleven: Victory Road (2025) – Mamoru Endō, Kanon Endō

=== Dubbing ===
==== Live-action ====
- Bull – Marissa Morgan (Geneva Carr)
- Cop Car – Travis (James Freedson-Jackson)
- Frailty – Young Fenton (Matt O'Leary)
- The Golden Compass (2010 TV Asahi edition) – Billy Costa (Charlie Rowe)
- A Lot like Love – Emily Friehl (Amanda Peet)
- Snake Eyes – Ana DeCobray / Baroness (Úrsula Corberó)
- The Thing About Pam – Leah Askey (Judy Greer)
- Touch – Jacob Bohm (David Mazouz)
- MrBeast – MrBeast (Jimmy Donaldson)

==== Animation ====
- The Amazing World of Gumball/The Wonderfully Weird World of Gumball – Gumball Watterson
- Beat Bugs – Jay
- Curious George – Bill
- Teenage Mutant Ninja Turtles: Mutant Mayhem – Wingnut
- Toy Story 4 – Giggle McDimples
- W.I.T.C.H. – Taranee Cook
- Zootopia – Dawn Bellwether

== Discography ==
=== Songs ===
- "Oh! Enka!" (Naruto)
- "Life Goes On" (Naruto)
- "Naruto's Neko Song" (Naruto)
- "Gyu-ru-ru" (as Naruto Uzumaki) (Naruto)
- "Touki ~Fighting Spirits~" (Naruto)
- "Naruto Ondo" (as Naruto Uzumaki) (Naruto (with Chie Nakamura and Showtaro Morikubo))
- "Distance" (as Naruto Uzumaki) (Naruto All Stars)
- "Tsubomi" (as Naruto Uzumaki) (Naruto All Stars)
- "Salamander" (as Takuya Kanbara) (Digimon Frontier)
- Secret Rendezvous (as Takuya Kanbara) (Digimon Frontier)
- "Muteki na Bataashi" (as Gomamon) (Digimon Adventure 02)
- "Sora wo Kurooru (as Gomamon) (Digimon Adventure 02 (with Masami Kikuchi))
- "Chie to Yuuki da! Medarotto" (as Metabee) (Medarot)
- Kaze no Muki ga Kattara (as Gon) (Hunter x Hunter)
- Tobira (Gon and Killua version) (Hunter x Hunter (with Mitsuhashi Kanako))
- Hunter Ondo (Hunter x Hunter (with Mitsuhashi Kanako and Kaida Yuki and Goda Hozumi))
- GONtte yatsu wa (Hunter x Hunter (with Mitsuhashi Kanako and Kaida Yuki and Goda Hozumi))
- ONNAtte subarashii (as Jango-sama) (Hunter x Hunter)
- Tabidachi (as Gon) (Hunter x Hunter)
- Taisetsuna koto (as Gon) (Hunter x Hunter (with Mitsuhashi Kanako))
- Te o Tsunaide (as Gon) (Hunter x Hunter (with Mitsuhashi Kanako))
- Futari (Ask Dr. Rin! (with Kana Kouguchi))
- Tomo Yo (as Ted) (Konjiki no Gash Bell!!)
- Kuroi Hitomi (as Kuromi) (Onegai My Melody)
- Kuromi Rondo (as Kuromi) (Onegai My Melody)
- Kuromi Punk (as Kuromi) (Onegai My Melody)
- Lambo-san's Ambition (as Lambo) (Reborn)
- Gyouza Gyuudon no Uta (as Lambo ) ("Reborn") (with Li Mei Chan)
- Yakusoku no Bashou (as Lambo ) ("Reborn") (with Vongola's Family)
- A fun song (as Lambo ) ("Reborn") (with Li Mei Chan)
- Tatta Latta (as Lambo ) ("Reborn") (with Li Mei Chan, Yuuna Inamura, Satomi Akesaka and Hitomi Yoshida
- Mirai no Oozora e (as Lambo ) ("Reborn") (with Vongola's Family)
- Mata ne no Kisetsu – 7th ending to Inazuma Eleven (as Endou Mamoru)
- Mamotte Miseru! – (Inazuma Eleven CD – Endou Mamoru Character Songs)
- Dakara Zettai Daijoubu – (Inazuma Eleven) as Endou Mamoru
- Maji de Kansha (as Endou Mamoru) (Inazuma Eleven cast)
- Reversible – (as Rin Natsuki) (Yes! PreCure 5)
- Jounetsu – (as Rin Natsuki) (Yes! PreCure 5)
- Okaerinasai – (as Rin Natsuki) (Yes! PreCure 5 GoGo!) (with Yūko Sanpei)
