= Katsuhito Akiyama =

Japanese storyboard artist and director

- 秋山 勝仁
- Born: January 29, 1950 (age 75); Hokkaidō, Japan
- Occupation(s): Director, screenwriter, storyboard artist

Katsuhito Akiyama (秋山 勝仁, Akiyama Katsuhito; born January 29, 1950) is a Japanese storyboard artist and director. He often works with Shinji Aramaki and Hideki Kakinuma.

== Filmography ==
=== Director ===
==== Films ====
- Elementalors (1995)
- Armitage III: Dual Matrix (2002)

==== OVAs ====
- Gall Force (1986–1991) Eternal Story — New Era
- Bubblegum Crisis (1987) Chief director
- Spirit Warrior (part 1 and 3, 1988)
- Sol Bianca (1990) (episode 1)
- The Wedge Between (1992)
- Bastard!! (1992)
- Sol Bianca: The Legacy (1999) Assistant director
- The Wedge Between (2009)

==== Television ====
- ThunderCats (1985-1988) (animator: 130 episodes)
- El Hazard: The Wanderers (1995)
- Magical Project S (1996)
- Battle Athletes Victory (1997)
- Dual! Parallel Trouble Adventure (1999)
- Monkey Turn (2004)
- Guyver: The Bioboosted Armor (2005)
- Pumpkin Scissors (2006)
- Inazuma Eleven (2008)
- Inazuma Eleven GO! (2011)
- Beyblade Burst (2016)
- Beyblade Burst Evolution (2017) (chief director)
- Beyblade Burst Turbo (2018) (chief director)
- Beyblade Burst Rise (2019) (chief director)
- Beyblade Burst Surge (2020) (chief director)
- Beyblade Burst QuadDrive (2021) (chief director)
- Beyblade Burst QuadStrike (2023) (chief director)
- Beyblade X (2023) (chief director)
