= Lambo (Reborn!) =

- Reborn! character
- 5-year-old Lambo and 15-year-old Lambo
- First appearance: Manga chapter 7 Anime episode 3
- Created by: Akira Amano
- Voiced by: Junko Takeuchi (child); Kenjirou Tsuda (adult)

In-universe information
- Nationality: Italian
- Association: Bovino Family; Vongola Family

Lambo (Japanese: ランボ, Hepburn: Ranbo) is a fictional character in the anime and manga series Reborn! created by Akira Amano. In the series, Lambo is an infant assassin who goes to Japan to kill the hitman Reborn. Upon his failure, he starts to live with Reborn's pupil, the future boss from the Vongola Mafia family Tsuna Sawada. As the series progresses, Lambo becomes one of Tsuna's six Vongola guardians, The Guardian of Lightning, and has to confront various enemies from the Vongola despite his young age. When Lambo shoots himself with the Ten-Year Bazooka (10年バズーカ) from Bovino family, he transforms into his future self from 10 years later nicknamed "Adult Lambo" (大人ランボ). His character has also been featured in CDs soundtracks and video games based on the Reborn! series.

Lambo's character has been well received by readers from the Reborn!, having been featured several times in the popularity poll from the series. Publications for manga, anime, and other media have commented on Lambo adding praise to and criticism to his appearances in the series. Various reviewers have liked Lambo's design, while others found his actions in the series to be entertaining.

== Character outline ==
=== Personality ===
Lambo is a 5-year-old Italian assassin affiliated with the Bovino Family. He comes to Japan to kill Reborn, so he can prove that he is worthy of becoming his own family's boss. He first appears on Tsunayoshi Sawada's window and tries to kill Reborn. However, he is a complete crybaby, and is no match for Reborn. Lambo's name was based on an Italian carmaker Lamborghini.

His future dream is to rule the world. While being taken care of by Tsuna, Lambo becomes very appreciative of his mother, Nana. Lambo dresses in a cow suit complete with a tail, and has a huge afro with horns on the sides of his head which gives him the appearance of a bison. He possesses the Ten-Year Bazooka, which switches the target with their own self from ten years later for five minutes. Every time Lambo loses his cool, he usually says "Gotta... Stay... Calm...", then he uses it on himself, switching with his 15-year-old self. In this form, he switches his cow suit for a casual suit and cow-print shirt.

Although Adult Lambo is shown to be handsome, he remains a crybaby, and is often heard saying things that imply his future involves cleaning toilets. He also begins many sentences with "Yare yare" (loosely translated as "Oh my!"; "Oh gosh!" or "My oh my" in Viz's translation), and often has one eye closed. Due to the unstable nature of the past affecting the future, Adult Lambo will only know of certain events after the adjustment in the past. At one point, he does not know of the Vongola Rings, but does during the tournament. When Adult Lambo uses the Ten-Year Bazooka, he transforms into his 25-year-old self. This version of Lambo is seen as having much more discipline, strength and intelligence than of his past selves, even being capable of almost easily defeating Leviathan during the tournament in the 5-minute effects of the Ten-Year Bazooka.

=== Abilities ===
The 5 year old Lambo is typically seen toting weapons like grenades and bazookas. In his 5 year old form his only notable ability is his Electric Skin (電撃皮膚; In Italian "Cuoio Elettrico") which allows electricity to harmlessly pass through his body. In the future although still in his younger form Lambo is capable of activating the Vongola box which takes the form of a bull that Lambo can ride on. His weapon is Lampo's Shield, body armor that can give out a huge electrical burst called Corna Fulmine. In the Simon arc, his ring is rebuilt into the Vongola Helmet which, in its Cambio Forma, becomes full body armor with powerful horns.

In his 15-year-old form he still possesses Electric Skin. However, he has another ability called Thunder Set in which he summons lightning and charges it through his body. Thunder Set is followed by another technique called Electrico Cornata (電撃角) which charges lighting through Lambo's horns and causes severe shock to whoever the attack connects with. However, it rarely works as it is short range and easy to dodge.

The 25-year-old Lambo invents the Perfect Electric Skin in which no form of electricity can do him harm. He also created the Electrico Reverse which allows him to take electricity passing through him and gathers into his hand. His final ability is an enhanced version of Electrico Cornata in which he can use the electricity in his horns and give it the shape of a blade which makes up for some of its short range.

== Appearances ==
=== In Reborn! ===
Lambo is introduced as an annoying crybaby assassin after Reborn. Soon after he starts living with him and Tsuna Sawada. His future self appears several times during the series, and protects Haru along with I-pin when Haru is used as hostage by the Kokuyo Gang who were fighting Tsuna and his friend. When the Varia want their boss, Xanxus, become the Vongola's tenth boss, Lambo is chosen to be Tsuna's Vongola lightning guardian by Iemitsu Sawada. As part of the fights between the Varia and the Vongola, Lambo faces up against Leviathan. Lambo soon finds the match too much for him, so he jumps into the Ten-Year Bazooka and then again in adult form, revealing the 10-year-old Lambo. Leviathan easily beats him, too, so he jumps into the ten year bazooka to reveal 25-year-old Lambo. The 25-year-old Lambo nearly beats Leviathan but is switched with the 5-year-old Lambo as his 5 minutes was up. Before being killed by Leviathan, the match is interrupted by Tsuna who loses his and Lambo's ring. Despite ending seriously injured, Lambo is forced to participate in the last fight between the Vongola and the Varia, in which he is protected by the Vongola guardian Hayato Gokudera. After the Vongola's victory, Lambo recovers from his wounds.

A short time later Lambo is transported to the future during the time the Millefiore Family is annihilating the Vongola. After Tsuna and his friends attack the Millefiore's Melone Base, Lambo infiltrate the Melone Base as back up along with Chrome Dokuro, I-Pin, and Tetsuya Kusakabe. After leaving the Melone Base, Lambo is trained by Gokudera in the use of rings and boxes to prepare for the fight against the Millefiore's guardians.

After returning to the present, Lambo joins Tsuna, Gokudera and Ryohei in facing the Shimon Family who had destroyed the Vongola Rings (which are remodelled by Talbot into the Vongola Gear) and kidnapped Chrome. When he goes up against Shimon Guardian Rauji Oyama, Lambo's desire to have Rauji play with him provides the flame energy needed to create his Vongola Gear, the Vongola Helmet Ver. X. When Rauji starts attacking, Lambo swaps with his future self and uses the Vongola Gear to fight against him. And thus defeated him with a new attack "ironhorn electrico".

=== In other media ===
Adult Lambo appeared in Katekyo Hitman Reborn! Battle Arena for the PlayStation Portable and in Katekyo Hitman Reborn! Dream Hyper Battle!. Although the later game was released for both the Wii and the PlayStation 2, Adult Lambo only appeared in the Wii version. On December 5, 2007, Pony Canyon released a Character CD featuring both Lambo and I-pin. It features various tracks and dialogue composed by both of their voice actors from their child selves: Junko Takeuchi and Li Mei Chan. On February 4, 2009, another CD named "Cosplay Party" was released. It featured Lambo, I-pin and Reborn featuring their voice actors. (with Reborn's one being Ken Narita).

== Reception ==
In the popularity polls from the series, Lambo has continuously ranked within the top ten. In the first poll Lambo ranked 5th with 1563 votes. In the second poll, which was divided between heroes and villains, Lambo once again ranked 5th in the heroes poll. In the third poll, Lambo ranked the 7th most popular male character. However, he was not featured in the top ten from the fourth poll. Lambo has also been featured in pieces of merchandising based on the series such as cups, apparels, and plush.

Lambo's introduction and development in Reborn! have been commented by several publications for manga, anime and other media. While reviewing the first volume from the series, Jarre Pine from Mania Entertainment found Lambo's child appearance to be very appealing for female readers as well as a good way to make various forms of merchandising. He also found his name to be very hilarious and noted that since he came from a "small line" of the Bovino Family, he thought that there would be a large number of assassins with Lambo's appearance. However, Erin Finnegan found Lambo's introduction in the series as well as his attitude with Reborn and Tsuna Sawada to be one of the several issues from the series he found while reading the first volume. However, in a later review, Finnegan found Lambo's actions in the series to be very funny, despite the fact some of the situations his character had were shown with other characters in other manga series. IGN's writer A.E. Sparrow found Lambo to be one of his favorite characters from Reborn! while commenting on volume 7 which was focused on him.
