= Elementalors =

Japanese manga series

精霊使い (Seirei Tsukai)
- Genre: Action, Adventure, Fantasy, Supernatural
- Manga
- Written by: Takeshi Okazaki
- Published by: Kadokawa Shoten
- Magazine: Newtype
- Original run: 1989 – 1997
- Volumes: 4
- Anime film
- Directed by: Katsuhito Akiyama
- Written by: Takeshi Okazaki
- Music by: Masanori Sasaji
- Studio: AIC
- Released: April 1, 1995
- Runtime: 48 minutes

Elementalors (精霊使い, Seirei Tsukai) is a Japanese manga series written and illustrated by Takeshi Okazaki.

The manga was adapted into an animated movie, which was released by AIC in Japan and Dybex in France on April 1, 1995. The movie was licensed by Dybex but the license is now discontinued.

== Plot ==
Elementalors are humans with the power to control the forces of nature. They are also needed to balance those forces so that everything stays in harmony. As Lord Shiki, who has the power of water, is kidnapping Asami to try and release his imprisoned daughter. Kagura realizes that he also has the power of the Elementalors, so he joins forces with others to rescue Asami and stop Lord Shiki rescue plan.

== Reception ==
Elementalors received the "Excellence Prize" in the manga category at the 1997 Japan Media Arts Festival.
