= Inazuma Eleven GO: Kyūkyoku no Kizuna Gurifon =

2011 film

- Poster
- Production company: OLM, Inc.
- Distributed by: Toho
- Release date: December 23, 2011 (Japan)
- Running time: 90 minutes
- Country: Japan
- Language: Japanese

Inazuma Eleven GO: Kyūkyoku no Kizuna Griffon (イナズマイレブンGO 究極の絆 グリフォン; lit. "Inazuma Eleven GO: The Ultimate Bond Griffon) is a 2011 anime film. It is the 2nd film based on the popular manga and anime series Inazuma Eleven series. The film premiered on December 23, 2011, in Japan. The movie was shown in both traditional 2D and stereoscopic 3D.

The movie centers around the authoritarian soccer dictatorship Fifth Sector, who assumes complete control of soccer in Japan. The Fifth Sector uses communist styled policies to manipulate soccer into a fake and controlled, yet accessible to all sport. Raimon Junior High School's soccer club, who is partaking in a revolution against Fifth Sector, gets kidnapped by them and taken to an island to fight soccer battles against specially trained soccer players.

== Plot ==
The movie takes place ten years after the original series, in the middle of the GO season. Soccer is now integral to social status, and as a result, the world of youth soccer is currently under the authoritarian rule of the Fifth Sector organization. A junior high school student, Matsukaze Tenma, is leading his soccer team, Raimon, on a revolution against them. After being abducted by Fifth Sector, the members of the Raimon team find themselves on an unknown island. Tsurugi Kyousuke, who used to work as a SEED for Fifth Sector before turning against them, recognises the island as God Eden, an island that Fifth Sector uses to train young soccer players into become SEEDs, by drawing out powerful avatars.

Raimon are confronted by the manager of God Edan Kibayama Douzan, the manager God Eden, and they are made to play a soccer match against a team of trained SEEDs called Unlimited Shining. Tsurugi recognises the team captain, Hakuryuu, from his time as a SEED. Raimon suffers an overwhelming defeat and are severely injured in the process. However, they are saved from captured, and awaken to discover that their rescuers are Endou Mamarou, their former captain, alongside Fudou Akio, Fubuki Shirou, Kabeyama Heigorou and Kazemaru Ichirouta, members of the legendary Inazuma Japan.

Raimon are informed that they will face another "battle" in several days. With the aide of the adults, they begin training for the match. During their training, Tenma meets a boy who apparently lives on the island, called Shuu. Shuu challenges Raimon to a match against his team called Ancient Dark, and displayed a great degree of skill. However, the match comes to a close with no score after Tenma interrupts the match to stop the ball from hitting a baby lamb, an act of kindness that catches Shuu's interest. Shuu gives Tenma special training, involving climbing a waterfall cliff-face, while the others continued their own training. During a private conversation, Shuu tells Tenma that sometime in the past soccer was used as a method to decide which girl in the community on the island would be sacrificed. He tells a story about a girl who was sacrificed due to her brother's "weakness", before seemingly vanishing. Meanwhile, Raimon's coach Kidou Yuuto, and the managers, Otonashi Haruna, Yamana Akane, Seto Midori and Sorano Aoi, manage to escape from the prison cell where they are being held captive. They witness the harsh, abusive training the SEEDs undergo by Fifth Sector first hand, and are just about to escape the facility when Aoi is captured again.

Raimon arrive at their match and are introduced to the team called "Zero". Shuu is revealed to be part of the team, alongside Hakuryuu. Tenma vows to show Shuu that soccer is supposed to be fun, and that the ideology of Fifth Sector is wrong. With the aide of Hakuryuu's avatar, Shining Dragon, Zero gains the upper hand over Raimon in the first half of the match. Tenma remembers his training and is able to "climb" past Hakuryuu's avatar. Similarly, the other Raimon players use their training to gain the upper hand, however, the tide turns back against them, and the match becomes increasingly more violent. Endou, unable to just stand by and watch any more, joins the match temporarily alongside the former Inazuma Japan members. During their time in the match, they are able to free Aoi from her cage-cell, removing Fifth Sector's leverage over Raimon.

The "battle" comes to a head when Hakuryuu and Shuu fuse their two avatars into Sei Kishi Arthur, and use Sword Excalibur to score a goal, bring the score to 4–5. Tenma, Tsurugi, and Shindou, fuse their own avatars into Matei Gryphon, and use Sword of Fire. Hakuryuu and Shu try to reverse the shoot with Sword Excalibur, but Sword of Fire breaks through, tying the score for Raimon. During the "final battle", Tenma had managed to get through to Shuu about the true value of soccer. Tsurugi also makes Hakuryuu realize that he finds enjoyment in soccer, by making him recall his childhood. The match resumes, the atmosphere in the stadium now much lighter, as Zero are now playing "real soccer" and both sides are having fun. The match ends with an "inconclusive" tied score; however the crowd erupts into applause.

After saying their partings, Raimon leave God Eden. Endou says that he has to stay to look into some matters, but promises he will be back soon. Shuu states a thank you to Tenma to himself, before dissolving away, revealing that he was a spirit. A post-credit scene shows Senguuji Daigo and Ishido Shuuji discussing that the actual purpose of Fifth Sector is discover those who hold the potential of the "Second Stage Children"
