= Inazuma Eleven =

- Japanese logo for the first Inazuma Eleven game and anime
- Genres: Role-playing, sports
- Developer: Level-5
- Publisher: Level-5, Nintendo
- Creator: Akihiro Hino
- Platforms: Nintendo DS, Mobile phone, Wii, Nintendo 3DS, Windows, Arcade, Android, iOS, Nintendo Switch, Nintendo Switch 2, PlayStation 4, PlayStation 5, Xbox Series X/S
- First release: Inazuma Eleven; August 22, 2008
- Latest release: Inazuma Eleven: Victory Road; November 13, 2025

Inazuma Eleven (イナズマイレブン, Inazuma Irebun; "Lightning Eleven") is a football themed media franchise created by Level-5. The franchise began with the release of Inazuma Eleven in 2008, with the game series selling over 8 million copies worldwide by 2016. In addition to video games, the franchise also includes a manga series and several anime television series and films.

The manga has been published by Shogakukan in CoroCoro Comic since the June 2008 issue. The manga series won the 2010 Kodansha Manga Award and 2011 Shogakukan Manga Award in the Children's Manga category.

== Plot ==
Endou Mamoru is a cheerful goalkeeper at Raimon Jr High, who has six other players on his team. The team is threatened with disbandment unless they can win a match against the Teikoku Gakuen, the best team in Japan. Endou tries to save the team by gathering four more players. In the second series, Endou and his team have to gather players to defeat the new enemies, Aliea Gakuen. In the third series, the Football Frontier International is announced and Inazuma Japan is assembled; it is coached by Kudou Michiya.

== Media ==
=== Video games ===
==== Main series ====
- Inazuma Eleven is the first entry in the series. It was released for Nintendo DS in Japan on August 22, 2008 and in the UK on August 26, 2011. The 3DS port of the game was released digitally via Nintendo eShop in the US on August 26, 2011.
- Inazuma Eleven 2 is the second entry and the first game to be released as two versions. Immediately following Raimon Middle School's victory at nationals, the team must save Japan from an alien invasion by beating them in football. It was originally released for the Nintendo DS in Japan on October 1, 2009 and in Europe on March 16, 2012.
- Inazuma Eleven 3 is the third game and the final installment of the original trilogy. Endou Mamoru and his friends and former rivals represent Japan at the international youth football tournament. The Spark and Bomber versions of the game were released for Nintendo DS in Japan on July 1, 2010, followed by The Ogre on December 16, 2010. The 3DS ports were released in Europe as Lightning Bolt and Bomb Blast on September 27, 2013, and Team Ogre Attacks! on February 14, 2014.
- Inazuma Eleven GO is the fourth installment. Set ten years after the events of Inazuma Eleven, Matsukaze Tenma leads a new Raimon team against the organization that has taken control of Japanese youth football. It was released in Japan for the Nintendo 3DS on December 15, 2011, in Europe on June 13, 2014, and in Australia and New Zealand on July 18, 2015.
- Inazuma Eleven GO 2: Chrono Stone was originally released for Nintendo 3DS in Japan on December 13, 2012 and in Europe on March 27, 2015. A mysterious organization from the future is attempting to alter the timeline, and Tenma must gather the strongest Eleven throughout history to save football.
- Inazuma Eleven GO: Galaxy was released for the Nintendo 3DS in Japan on December 5, 2013. Tenma enters the youth international tournament only to discover that this year's edition is a cover-up for the Grand Celesta Galaxy, a galactic football tournament where the fate of planets is on the line. The Earth Eleven must win the tournament to save humanity.
- Inazuma Eleven: Victory Road was released digital-only on November 13, 2025 for Nintendo Switch, Nintendo Switch 2, PlayStation 4, PlayStation 5, Steam, and Xbox Series X/S. The main story takes place in twenty-five years after the original Inazuma Eleven and features a new cast. Sasanami Unmei was forced to quit football as child due to a heart condition but decides to restart the football club at Nagumohara Junior High in Nagasaki, Kyuushuu. He soon meets Endou Haru, the "football monster" of Japanese youth football and son of original series protagonist Endou Mamoru.
- Inazuma Eleven: Bold Revolution

==== Spin-offs ====
- Inazuma Eleven Dash (2010)
- Inazuma Eleven Strikers (2011)
- Inazuma Eleven Strikers 2012 Xtreme (2011)
- Inazuma Eleven GO Strikers 2013 (2012)
- Inazuma Eleven 1, 2, 3!! The Legend of Mamoru Endou (compilation, 2012)
- Inazuma Eleven Everyday (2012)
- LINE Puzzle de Inazuma Eleven (2013)
- Inazuma Eleven Online (2014)
- Inazuma Eleven SD (2020)
- Inazuma Eleven Cross (2026)

=== Anime ===
The animated series, Inazuma Eleven, was produced by OLM, Inc. and Dentsu Inc., and directed by Katsuhito Akiyama. 127 episodes aired on TV Tokyo from October 5, 2008 to April 27, 2011.

The series was available for video on-demand streaming via Toon Goggles.

The second series, Inazuma Eleven GO, released in conjunction with the manga of the same name, aired from May 4, 2011, to April 11, 2012. It was followed by Inazuma Eleven GO: Chrono Stone and Inazuma Eleven GO: Galaxy.

- Inazuma Eleven (2008–2011)
  - Inazuma Eleven season 1
  - Inazuma Eleven season 2
  - Inazuma Eleven season 3
- Inazuma Eleven GO (2011–2014)
  - Inazuma Eleven GO
  - Inazuma Eleven GO: Chrono Stone
  - Inazuma Eleven GO: Galaxy
- Inazuma Eleven: Outer Code (2016–2017)
  - Inazuma Eleven: Reloaded (2018)
  - Inazuma Eleven: Ares (2018)
  - Inazuma Eleven: Orion no Kokuin (2018–2019)

=== Films ===
- Inazuma Eleven: Saikyō Gundan Ōga Shūrai (2010)
- Inazuma Eleven GO: Kyūkyoku no Kizuna Gurifon (2011)
- Inazuma Eleven GO vs. Danbōru Senki W (2012)
- Inazuma Eleven: Chō Jigen Dream Match (2014)
- Inazuma Eleven The Movie: Legendary Kickoff (2024)

=== Manga ===
The first Inazuma Eleven manga was written and illustrated by Tenya Yabuno. It began publication in the June 2008 issue of the Shogakukan magazine CoroCoro Comic and ended in the September 2011 issue. A total of ten tankōbon (bound) volumes of Inazuma Eleven have been released in Japan between September 26, 2008, and October 28, 2011.

No.	Release date	ISBN
1	September 26, 2008	978-4-09-140699-6
2	February 26, 2009	978-4-09-140780-1
3	June 26, 2009	978-4-09-140830-3
4	October 28, 2009	978-4-09-140852-5
5	February 26, 2010	978-4-09-140898-3
6	June 28, 2010	978-4-09-141068-9
7	October 28, 2010	978-4-09-141128-0
8	February 28, 2011	978-4-09-141204-1
9	June 28, 2011	978-4-09-141064-1
10	October 28, 2011	978-4-09-141347-5

Inazuma Eleven received another adaptation in Shōgaku Sannensei magazine by Terae Kichijyo from 2009-2012 and compiled in three volumes under the title Inazuma Eleven SPECIAL.

The Inazuma Eleven GO manga was published in CoroCoro Comic from 2011-2014.

Atsushi Ooba's manga adaptation of Inazuma Eleven Ares was serialized in CoroCoro Comic from January 2018 to September 2019 and compiled into four volumes. A second manga accompanying the release of the Ares anime, Inazuma Eleven ~Penguin wo Tsugumono~, was published on Shogakukan's online platform Sunday Webry and focuses on forward Ryouhei Haizaki from Seishou Academy. A manga featuring the third protagonist of Ares, Yuuma Nosaka, was announced for serialization in MangaONE but has not materialized.

A spin-off web manga based on the striker Shuuya Gouenji, HonoSuto! ~Gouenji no Hitorigoto~, began online serialization on the web platform Manga-5 in 2020 and is ongoing.

A manga adaptation of Inazuma Eleven: Victory Road began serialization in Monthly CoroCoro Comic and was moved to Weekly CoroCoro Comic starting from chapter 4.

== Reception ==
Inazuma Eleven won "Best Children's Manga" at the 34th annual Kodansha Manga Awards.

According to Kogyo Tsushinsha, the first film, Inazuma Eleven Saikyō Gundan Ōga Shūrai, debuted in second place at the Japanese box office for the weekend of December 25 and 26, 2010. By February 6, 2011, the film had grossed US$ 21,099,188 by its seventh week of screening in the country.
