= Inazuma Eleven GO (video game) =

2011 video game

- European cover art for the Light version
- Developer: Level-5
- Publishers: JP: Level-5; PAL: Nintendo
- Composer: Shiho Terada
- Series: Inazuma Eleven
- Platform: Nintendo 3DS
- Release: JP: December 15, 2011; EU: June 13, 2014; AU: July 18, 2015
- Genres: Role-playing, sports
- Modes: Single-player, multiplayer

Inazuma Eleven GO (Note: Japanese: イナズマイレブン GO, Hepburn: Inazuma Irebun GO; lit. 'Lightning Eleven GO') is a 2011 role-playing video game and sports video game for the Nintendo 3DS by Level-5. It is the fourth main installment in the Inazuma Eleven series, and the first entry in its GO trilogy. It was released on December 15, 2011 in Japan and Europe on June 13, 2014 and released on July 18, 2015 in Australia and New Zealand. There are two versions of the game, Shine and Dark, which was released in Europe as Light and Shadow. An Inazuma Eleven GO manga based on the game began serialization in CoroCoro Comic, while an anime TV season based on the game produced by OLM started airing on May 4, 2011.

Set 10 years after the events of Inazuma Eleven 3, the game takes place in a world where an organization called Fifth Sector rules over the world of soccer and manipulates matches as an authoritarian dictatorship based on broad-communistic values of distributing soccer and the joy of victory equally among everyone. Arion Sherwind (松風天馬, Matsukaze Tenma), and his soccer club, Raimon Jr. High, attempt to lead a revolution against Fifth Sector, by going against Fifth Sector's laws and winning the Holy Road soccer tournament. A sequel, Inazuma Eleven GO 2: Chrono Stone, was released in 2012.

== Gameplay ==
Similar to the previous entries, the core gameplay involves a role-playing adventure in which the player controls Arion to explore the map, recruit new players, advance the story, and engage in soccer battles. Likewise, soccer Matches and soccer battles are controlled using the touch screen, and play in the same way as all prior games. New to GO are "Fighting Spirits" (化身, Keshin; lit. 'Avatar'). Fighting Spirits are mythical beings which players can summon during soccer matches/battles. A player's Fighting Spirit gives them an offensive and defensive advantage, and often allow the summoner to perform unique special moves which involve their Fighting Spirit.

== Plot ==
10 years after the FFI, an unnoticed darkness lurks behind the country; Japan and what used to be soccer has changed over the decade. Because of the victory of Inazuma National, soccer has become greatly popular and influential in the country, to the point that a school's worth is directly proportional to the skill of their soccer team. The weak schools are forgotten and forced to close down due to lack of public interest and applicants. Soccer in Japan is now controlled by an organization called Fifth Sector and is led by the one known as the "Holy Emperor" Alex Zabel (イシド・シュウジ, Ishido Shūji). Soccer in its current state is controlled and relies on the commands of the Holy Emperor on whether a team wins or loses based on set scores. This saved schools all over the nation from closing down by balancing tournaments—but a price had to be paid: "real soccer" didn't exist.

The protagonist, Arion Sherwind, tries out for the Raimon soccer team and passes. But he soon realizes that soccer is not how he imagined it to be. Arion stirs a revolutionary wind among with the members of the Raimon team, and they soon aim to free soccer from Fifth Sector so that middle school students all over Japan can finally play without Fifth Sector's orders. And the Raimon team is not alone; they discover the Resistance that aims to replace the Holy Emperor, and are also assisted by the previous main characters of the series. With every match they win in the Holy Road, Raimon wins over more schools to their cause.

== Reception ==
Reception

Aggregate scores
Aggregator	Score
GameRankings	75.56% 77.50%
Metacritic	74/100 (Note: Based on 19 Critic Reviews)

Review scores
Publication	Score
Nintendo Life	7/10
Nintendo World Report	8/10

The game received mixed or favorable reviews on Metacritic.

== See also ==
- List of Inazuma Eleven GO episodes
