= Inazuma Eleven GO: Galaxy =

2013 video game

- Cover art for the Supernova version of the game
- Developer: Level-5
- Publisher: Level-5
- Composers: Yasunori Mitsuda; Natsumi Kameoka
- Series: Inazuma Eleven
- Platform: Nintendo 3DS
- Release: JP: December 5, 2013
- Genres: Role-playing, sports
- Modes: Single-player, multiplayer

Inazuma Eleven GO: Galaxy (Note: Japanese: イナズマイレブンGO ギャラクシー, Hepburn: Inazuma Irebun GO Galaxy; lit. 'Lightning Eleven GO: Galaxy') is a 2013 role-playing video game and sports video game for the Nintendo 3DS developed and published by Level-5. It is the sequel to Inazuma Eleven GO 2: Chrono Stone and the third and final entry in the Inazuma Eleven series's GO trilogy. It was released in Japan on December 5, 2013. There are two versions of the game, Big Bang and Supernova. An Inazuma Eleven GO manga based on the game began serialization in Corocoro Comic, while an anime TV season based on the game produced by OLM was aired from May 2013 to March 2014 in Japan.

In the game's storyline, players take control of Arion Sherwind (松風天馬, Matsukaze Tenma), the captain of "Earth Eleven", soccer team representing the Earth in an intergalactic soccer tournament where failure will mean humanity's end.

== Plot ==
Football Frontier International Vision 2 (FFIV2) is held, and it's time when all youth soccer teams from different countries can finally compete in the tournament. However, Inazuma National, the representative team of Japan, have only eleven members—and eight of them are new to soccer. Arion, Victor and Riccardo, as the seniors, must reorganize the team in order to win the tournament.

However, Inazuma National miraculously win all the matches of the Asia preliminaries, and the truth finally unfolds to them—FFIV2 is merely a fake. It is only a preparation for Inazuma National to enter the Grand Celesta Galaxy, the galactic tournament that will decide Earth's fate.
