= Inazuma Eleven GO vs. Danbōru Senki W =

2012 film by Yoshikazu Miyao

- Poster for the movie
- Directed by: Yoshikazu Miyao
- Screenplay by: Akihiro Hino
- Music by: Yasunori Mitsuda; Natsumi Kameoka; Rei Kondoh
- Production company: OLM, Inc.
- Release date: December 1, 2012
- Running time: 90 minutes
- Country: Japan
- Language: Japanese
- Box office: 7,425,322

Inazuma Eleven GO vs. Danbōru Senki W (イナズマイレブンGO vs ダンボール戦機W) is a 2012 crossover anime film between the Inazuma Eleven and Little Battlers Experience franchises produced by OLM, Inc., premiered in theaters on December 1, 2012.

== Summary ==
During a friendly soccer match against the veteran Inazuma Legend Japan team, Matsukaze Tenma and his Shinsei Inazuma Japan team are being attacked by a mysterious soccer player, followed by a swarm of LBXs commanded by a mysterious boy, causing chaos everything. A mysterious girl named Fran then proclaims the destruction of their world by erasing the world with her powers, seemingly killing Mamoru Endou and his Inazuma Legend Japan team, but Tenma and his friends are barely able to escape due to the timely intervention from Rei Fune.

Similarly in pursuit of these three perpetrators, Ban explains that the arrival of Fran and her brothers and accomplices, Asta and San, causes the barrier between worlds to slowly breaking apart, threaten both worlds. Realizing that their differences and the strengths of their respected hobbies might be the only thing standing between their worlds and its destruction, Tenma, Ban and their allies must unite to fight off their common foes and save all of reality from falling apart.

== Characters ==
Inazuma Eleven GO
Tenma Matsukaze (Arion Sherwind)
Kyousuke Tsurugi (Victor Blade)
Takuto Shindou (Riccardo Di Rigo)
Ranmaru Kirino (Gabriel Garcia)
Shinsuke Nishizono (Jean-Pierre Lapin)
Taiyou Amemiya (Sol Daystar)
Hakuryuu (Bailong)
Hyouga Yukimura (Njord Snio)
Kinako Nanobana (Goldie Lemmon)
Masaki Kariya (Aitor Cazador)
Ryouma Nishiki (Ryoma Nishiki)
Fei Rune (Fei Rune)
Adults
Mamoru Endou (Mark Evans)
Shuuya Gouenji (Axel Blaze)
Shirou Fubuki (Shawn Froste)
Ichirouta Kazemaru (Nathan Swift)
Akio Fudou (Caleb Stonewall)
Heigorou Kabeyama (Jack Wallside)
Jirou Sakuma (David Samford)
Yuuto Kidou (Jude Sharp)
Jousuke Tsunami (Hurley Kane)
Ryuugo Someoka (Kevin Dragonfly)
Hiroto Kira (Xavier Schiller)

Full list: List of Inazuma Eleven GO characters

Danbōru Senki W
Ban Yamano (Van Yamano)
Hiro Oozora (Hiro Hughes)
Ran Hanasaki (Laura Hanasaki)
Jin Kaidō (Justin Kaidou)
Kazuya Aoshima (Kaz Walker)
Ami Kawamura (Amy Cohen)
Yūya Haibara (Nils Richter)
Asuka Kojō (Asuka Carter)
Jessica Kaios (Jessica Kaiosu)
