= Inazuma Eleven (video game) =

2008 video game

- European cover art
- Developer: Level-5
- Publisher: Level-5: PAL: Nintendo
- Director: Takehiro Fujii
- Producer: Akihiro Hino
- Composer: Yasunori Mitsuda
- Series: Inazuma Eleven
- Platforms: Nintendo DS; Nintendo 3DS
- Release: JP: August 22, 2008; EU: January 28, 2011; UK: August 26, 2011; USA: February 13, 2014 (3DS)
- Genres: Role-playing, sports
- Modes: Single-player, multiplayer

Inazuma Eleven (Note: Japanese: イナズマイレブン, Hepburn: Inazuma Irebun; lit. 'Lightning Eleven') is a 2008 role-playing sports video game developed and published by Level-5 for the Nintendo DS. It was released in Japan in August 2008 and in Europe by Nintendo in 2011. An updated Nintendo 3DS port was included in a compilation for the Nintendo 3DS, Inazuma Eleven 1-2-3: Endou Mamoru's Legend, which was released in Japan in December 2012. This version was later released separately in North America on February 13, 2014, as a downloadable game via the Nintendo eShop, and was the first game in the series available in North America.

The game has spawned a franchise, with numerous sequels and other media. An Inazuma Eleven manga based on the games began serialization in CoroCoro Comic in May 2008, while an anime based on the games started airing in October 2008. Mitsui has also created a collectible card game tie-in. A direct sequel, Inazuma Eleven 2 released in 2009.

A remake titled Inazuma Eleven RE is slated for release on Nintendo Switch, Nintendo Switch 2, PlayStation 5 and Windows in 2026.

== Plot ==
The main character, Mark Evans (円堂 守, Endō Mamoru) , is a very talented goalkeeper and the grandson of the late David Evans (円堂 大介, Endō Daisuke) , one of the strongest goalkeepers in Japan and coach of the legendary football team, the Inazuma Eleven (though Endou is unaware of this). He is captain of his school's (Raimon Jr. High) football team, and dreams of competing in the Football Frontier tournament one day. The club is on the verge of disbanding, as the other members seem uninterested in training.

One day, a mysterious forward named Axel Blaze (豪炎寺 修也, Gōenji Shūya) moves to Mark's school. Axel used to be the top striker at his old school, and has gained the attention of Royal Academy (led by team captain Jude Sharp and coach Ray Dark), the most prestigious school in the area. They come to Raimon and challenge them to a football match, despite Axel refusing to join Raimon's team. They are much more powerful than anticipated, and Raimon's out-of-practice players take a horrible beating. Axel decides to join the team to help them out, and his sudden appearance surprises Royal, which he uses as an opportunity to score a goal. As the first goal scored against Royal Academy in years, Jude counts it as a win for Raimon and leaves with his team.

The victory gets Raimon a lot of attention, allowing them access into the Football Frontier tournament, which they gladly accept. They prove themselves as a force-to-be reckoned-with, winning all of their matches and reaching the finals. Before the match, Dark uses the team's coach to spy on them, and orders him to kill them by draining the brake fluid from their bus. His plan is foiled by Nelly Raimon the school counsellor's daughter, who promptly gets the teacher fired. At the match, Dark tries to kill them again by crushing them with girders. They survive thanks to a warning from Jude, and Dark is promptly arrested by Detective Gregory Smith. The match goes on, and after a long battle, Raimon emerges victorious.

The team then move onto the Football Frontier nationals, but learn they will be unable to compete without a coach. Detective Smith points Mark in the direction of a man named Seymour Hillman, who used to be part of Raimon's team from forty years ago, the Inazuma Eleven. He explains that the team was coached by Mark's grandfather David, and that they were an unstoppable soccer team. This excites Mark, until Hillman tells him about how their run was ended when their bus crashed on the way to their last Football Frontier match, injuring the players and preventing them from competing.

Despite his past, Hillman agrees to be the team's coach, and also gets the team training with the now-elderly members of the Inazuma Eleven. This training helps them win their next few matches, along with the assistance of Jude, who joins them after Royal is crushed by Zeus Junior High, who, unbeknownst to them, is being led by Dark. Zeus also continue to win all their games, each time leaving their opponents unable to continue. This means the final will be Raimon versus Zeus.

When Raimon arrive at the stadium for the finals (which is a floating palace in the sky), they see the members of Zeus drinking a so-called 'ambrosia', which turns out to be filled with drugs to improve their abilities. The first half begins, and Zeus begin winning instantly thanks to the ambrosia; benching most of the players and scoring goal after goal. As the first half ends, Nelly realises that the drinks are spiked, and goes to switch the drinks with regular water. Her plan succeeds, and Zeus are forced to play through the remainder of the game as a normal team, allowing Raimon to seize victory and win the Football Frontier.

== Gameplay ==
By talking to Celia inside the team's clubroom, players can scout out other members of the school they want to add to their team, either by name/criteria, or by a 'connection map', which grows bigger the more players obtained from it. They can then locate them on the overworld and challenge them to a battle, which, if won, adds them to their party. Also, by talking to Natsumi in the clubroom, players can recruit people from the various teams they have beaten in the main story. There are nearly 1000 playable characters to collect, each with their own unique design, stats and abilities, but only 100 can be contained in a player's party at once.

The other part of the game is the football matches themselves. Players control their team with the stylus, moving players and passing between teammates. Running into an opponent initiates a command duel, where the player can do things like dodge an opponent's attempt at a tackle, slide-tackle to take the ball away, or attempt to score a goal. The result of any of their players' actions in a duel are determined by their form, which is decided by their stats (Kick, Body, Control, Guard, Speed, Stamina, and Guts), the player's element (either Wood, Air, Earth or Fire, which work in a 'rock-paper-scissors'-like fashion), and the total number of players participating in an action.

Matches either take the form of the aforementioned 4-a-side kickabouts against members of the school, or a full-scale 11-a-side game against one of the other teams competing in the tournaments. In full-size games, players can have up to five substitutes ready to switch in during a time-out. Before a match begins, players can change their team's formation using cards they have obtained by beating other teams and looking in chests. Winning matches grants teams experience points (which level up their players), prestige points (which are used to buy items in shops and to recover FP and TP), and friendship points (which are spent when scouting and recruiting new players), as well as recovery items, equipment, and formation cards.

Instead of making standard movements in duels like dodging or shooting, players can also use special abilities, called "hissatsus", to learn either by leveling up or using an unusual move manually. They are typically more powerful and effective than their regular counterparts and can typically only be stopped by other moves, but cost TP (Technical Points) to use. They are divided into four categories: Shoot hissatsus are used to score goals; Dribble hissatsus allow the player to get past an opponent; Block hissatsus take the ball away from the opponent; and Catch hissatsus are able to stop shots that catching normally would not achieve. These abilities include summoning a dragon to shoot the ball or creating a giant hand of energy to save a shot. Special moves also have elements, which give them a boost when used by a player of the same element.

Sometimes, the victor of a duel can receive a foul, resulting in a free kick (or penalty). Other mid-match abilities include: time-outs, where the player can pause the match to plan movements or switch in subs and then initiate them after un-pausing; charges, where the player taps on a team-member rapidly to give them a speed boost (at the cost of Fitness Points, or FP); and firing-up, which boosts a team's overall performance.

== Reception ==
Reception

Aggregate scores
Aggregator	Score
GameRankings	77.87%(3DS)
Metacritic	75/100 (based on 11 reviews)

Review scores
Publication	Score
Destructoid	9/10
Eurogamer	7/10
Famitsu	36/40
GameSpot	6/10
IGN	7.5/10
Nintendo Life	8/10
Official Nintendo Magazine	89%
3D Juegos	8/10
Cubed3	8 out of 10
Fragland	84%
Gamer.nl	8/10
Vandal Online	8.2/10

The game received generally favorable reviews according to review aggregator website Metacritic. The Japanese magazine Famitsu gave the game a total score of 36 out of 40, with two reviewers giving it a 9 out of 10, one giving it a full 10, and another giving it an 8. The Dutch reviewer Gamer.nl gave the game a score of 8 out of 10, while the Spanish reviewers 3D Juegos, Vandal Online and VicioJuegos gave it scores of 8.0 out of 10, 8.2 out of 10, and 83 out of 100, respectively. Official Nintendo Magazine dedicated a six-page spread to Inazuma Eleven and showcased the game on their front cover, awarding an 89% score.

Fragland gave the game a score of 84%, praising its "original combat system, beautiful and cute graphics, good sound and a very tight and deep gameplay and finishing." Nintendo Life gave it 8 stars out of 10, concluding that it is a "refreshing take on" the RPG genre and that "the compelling storyline, overall charm and well-structured fantasy style football system" will create "an experience that RPG lovers will come to cherish."

It was the first best-selling game in Japan the week of its release at 41,000 copies. The game sold 29,000 copies in its second week and 14,000 copies in its third week.
