= Inazuma Eleven Strikers =

2011 video game

- European cover art
- Developers: Level-5, Shade
- Publishers: JP: Level-5; EU: Nintendo
- Composers: Yasunori Mitsuda; Natsumi Kameoka
- Series: Inazuma Eleven
- Platform: Wii
- Release: JP: July 16, 2011; EU: September 28, 2012
- Genres: Role-playing, sports
- Modes: Single-player, multiplayer

Inazuma Eleven Strikers (Note: Japanese: イナズマイレブン ストライカーズ, Hepburn: Inazuma Irebun Strikers) is a 2011 role-playing and sports video game by Level-5. An entry in the Inazuma Eleven series, it was released for the Wii. It is the first Inazuma Eleven game to have both Inazuma Eleven GO and Inazuma Eleven characters in it.

== Development ==
The game was originally scheduled to release on April 28, 2011, before being delayed to July 16.

== Reception ==
Reception

Aggregate scores
Aggregator	Score
GameRankings	58/100
Metacritic	59/100

Review scores
Publication	Score
Eurogamer	7/10
GameSpot	5/10
Nintendo Life	5/10

MetaCritic gave this game mixed or average ratings.
