= Inazuma Eleven GO (manga) =

2011 manga and anime

- Inazuma Eleven GO!

イナズマイレブン GO! (Inazuma Irebun GO!)
- Genre: Sports
- Manga
- Written by: Tenya Yabuno
- Published by: Shogakukan
- Magazine: CoroCoro Comic
- Original run: November 2011 – April 2014
- Volumes: 7
- TV series
- Inazuma Eleven GO
- Films
- Inazuma Eleven GO: Kyūkyoku no Kizuna Gurifon; Inazuma Eleven GO vs. Danbōru Senki W

Inazuma Eleven GO (イナズマイレブン GO, Inazuma Irebun GO; lit. "Lightning Eleven GO") is a Japanese manga series written and illustrated by Tenya Yabuno. It is based on the Level-5 video game of the same title. The manga has been published by Shogakukan in CoroCoro Comic.

== Plot ==
=== GO ===
Set 10 years after the first anime Inazuma Eleven, a new soccer system is implemented where the results of matches are predetermined even down to the point scoring.

A boy called Matsukaze Tenma loves soccer. However, it is being controlled by Fifth Sector and he is highly against it. In the first episode, he wants to join the Raimon soccer club, but upon arrival, a mysterious team crushes the Raimon soccer club, including its second team. All the second team members leave and Tenma is tested before he joins the team. Now with his new friends, he and Raimon go against the soccer being rigged by Fifth Sector and is determined to defend his soccer honor.

=== Chrono Stone ===
After Tenma returns from Okinawa from tutoring the local children about soccer, he returns to Raimon, only to discover that the soccer club has never existed. Alpha, a person who comes from El Dorado, an organization from the future hell-bent on destroying soccer, tries to erase Tenma's soccer memories. With the assistance of Fei Rune and Clark Wonderbot, both came from the future, Tenma and his friends must defeat El Dorado in order to return soccer to the world.

=== Galaxy ===
Football Frontier International Vision 2 (FFI V2) is being held, and all the best school soccer teams gathered in hope to gain a place in Shinsei Inazuma Japan, Japan's new national soccer team. But things are getting out of control when instead of skilled players, 8 soccer players who are new to soccer are selected, along with Tenma, Tsurugi and Shindō. The team is deemed to be a failure by both audience and Shindō himself, so what is happening? Will Shinsei Inazuma Japan be able to shine on the world stage, or is it too bad to even win a match?

Later, as Shinsei Inazuma Japan advanced through the Asia premilinaries, a terrible truth unfolds—FFIV2 is actually the preliminaries of District A of an interplanetary tournament: Grand Celesta Galaxy. In order to save Earth from elimination, Earth Eleven must win through the tournament against all kinds of aliens...

== Media ==
=== Video game ===
Inazuma Eleven GO is a role-playing video game and sports video game for the Nintendo 3DS developed and published by Level-5. It was released on December 15, 2011, in Japan and Europe on June 13, 2014, and released on July 18, 2015, in Australia and New Zealand. There are two versions of the game, Shine and Dark, which was released in Europe as Light and Shadow.

=== Anime television series ===
An anime television series based on the game aired on the TV Tokyo network from May 4, 2011. The series was produced by Level-5 in conjunction with TV Tokyo, Dentsu, and OLM.

=== Anime films ===
The first animated film, Inazuma Eleven GO: Kyūkyoku no Kizuna Gurifon (イナズマイレブンGO 究極の絆 グリフォン), premiered in Japanese theaters on December 23, 2011.

In 2012, the crossover Inazuma Eleven GO vs. Danbōru Senki W film was revealed on the July issue of Shogakukan's Monthly Corocoro Comic magazine.
