= Inazuma Eleven GO 2: Chrono Stone =

2012 video game

- European cover art for the Thunderflash version
- Developer: Level-5
- Publishers: JP: Level-5; EU: Nintendo
- Composers: Yasunori Mitsuda; Natsumi Kameoka
- Series: Inazuma Eleven
- Platform: Nintendo 3DS
- Release: JP: December 13, 2012; EU: March 27, 2015
- Genres: Role-playing, sports
- Modes: Single-player, multiplayer

Inazuma Eleven GO 2: Chrono Stone (Note: Japanese: イナズマイレブンＧＯ2 クロノ・ストーン, Hepburn: Inazuma Irebun GO 2 Kurono Sutōn; lit. 'Lightning Eleven GO 2: Chrono Stone'), also known as Inazuma Eleven GO Chrono Stones in Europe, is a 2012 role-playing and sports video game for the Nintendo 3DS by Level-5. It was released on December 13, 2012 in Japan and in Europe on March 27, 2015. It is the fifth main installment in the Inazuma Eleven series, a direct sequel to Inazuma Eleven GO and the second entry in its GO trilogy. There are two versions of the game, Neppuu ("Scorching Wind"), Wildfire in Europe, and Raimei ("Thunderclap"), Thunderflash in Europe. An Inazuma Eleven GO manga based on the game began serialization in CoroCoro Comic, while an anime TV season based on the game produced by OLM started airing on April 18, 2012. The story follows star Arion Sherwind, his team, Raimon, and mysterious friendly allies who have come from the future, as they use a time machine to journey across history and attempt to prevent mysterious organisation from the future's plans to erase soccer from history. A sequel, Inazuma Eleven GO: Galaxy, released in 2013.

== Plot ==
When Arion Sherwind (松風天馬, Matsukaze Tenma) returns to Raimon, he finds out that all his teammates and friends are no longer members of the Raimon Soccer Club, as it does not exist anymore. An international organization hell-bent on erasing soccer called El Dorado has sent Alpha, an assassin from the future, as soccer has become a fearsome weapon in the future.

Arion is saved by Fei Rune and his companion Clark von Wunderbar (クラーク・ワンダバット, Clark Wonderbot), who comes from 200 years in the future to help Arion to protect soccer. After they fix the timeline to the original state, Raimon Soccer Club is back, but El Dorado keeps sending assassin teams to destroy Raimon Soccer Club, and so the team go on a quest to assemble The Strongest Eleven in History and collect their aura to strengthen themselves in order to defeat El Dorado.

== Gameplay ==
Chrono Stone offers several new gameplay aspects. "Armourfying" turns an Fighting Spirit into wearable amour, which gives the player full control of the avatar's offensive and defensive power. Completely new to Chrono Stone is Mixi-Max, which allows two characters to transfer their auras between each other. When activated, Mixi-Max transforms the player into a "hybrid" of themselves and their Mixi-Max partner, allowing them to utilise their partner's power.

== Reception ==
Reception

Aggregate score
Aggregator	Score
GameRankings	79% 78%
