= Lists of Inazuma Eleven episodes =

Inazuma Eleven is a Japanese media franchise with multiple television adaptations. Lists of Inazuma Eleven episodes include:

== Original series ==
- Inazuma Eleven season 1
- Inazuma Eleven season 2
- Inazuma Eleven season 3

== GO series ==
- Inazuma Eleven GO
- Inazuma Eleven GO: Chrono Stone
- Inazuma Eleven GO: Galaxy

== Other series ==
- List of Inazuma Eleven: Ares episodes
- List of Inazuma Eleven: Orion no Kokuin episodes
