= Inazuma Eleven 3 =

2010 video game

- Art for the Lightning Bolt/Bomb Blast versions
- Developer: Level-5
- Publishers: JP: Level-5; EU: Nintendo
- Director: Takehiro Fujii
- Producer: Akihiro Hino
- Composers: Yasunori Mitsuda; Natsumi Kameoka
- Series: Inazuma Eleven
- Platforms: Nintendo DS, Nintendo 3DS
- Release: Nintendo DS: JP: 1 July 2010 (Spark/Bomber); JP: 16 December 2010 (The Ogre); Nintendo 3DS: JP: 27 December 2012; EU: 27 September 2013 (Lightning Bolt/Bomb Blast); EU: 14 February 2014 (Team Ogre Attacks!)
- Genres: Role-playing, sports
- Modes: Single-player, multiplayer

Inazuma Eleven 3 (Note: Japanese: イナズマイレブン3 世界への挑戦!!, Hepburn: Inazuma Irebun 3: Sekai e no Chousen!!; lit. 'Lightning Eleven 3: Challenge to the World!!') is a 2010 role-playing video game and sports video game for the Nintendo DS by Level-5. It is a direct sequel to Inazuma Eleven 2, and the final installment in Inazuma Eleven's original trilogy. There are 3 versions of the game: Spark and Bomber, released on 1 July 2010 in Japan, followed on 16 December 2010 by The Ogre.

All three versions of this game were included in an updated re-release compilation titled Inazuma Eleven 1-2-3: Endou Mamoru's Legend for the Nintendo 3DS, released on 27 December 2012 in Japan. They were later released separately in Europe both digitally and physically, as Lightning Bolt (originally Spark) and Bomb Blast (originally Bomber) in Europe on 27 September 2013. The release of the third version, as Team Ogre Attacks!, followed on 13 February 2014.

A manga based on the game began serialization in CoroCoro Comic, while an anime TV season based on the game, produced by OLM, started airing on 3 February 2010.

A sequel focusing on a new cast of characters, Inazuma Eleven GO, released in 2011.

== Plot ==
After defeating Alius Academy, Raimon faces a new challenge: the Football Frontier International, a tournament featuring players from across Japan. A team is subsequently selected to represent Japan in the competition, known as Inazuma National.

They would then have to win the Asia preliminaries to compete in the actual worldwide tournament, facing teams from England, America, Italy, and more. Throughout their adventure in the FFI, they also come across angels and devils that they have to defeat, otherwise the Demon King will be revived after its 1000-year sleep.

There also seems to be a new villain trying to gain something, Zoolan Rice, who is using soccer as a tool to take over the world and wanting to create a war.

Inazuma National has to go through other struggles, such as having an unknown coach known as the 'cursed coach,' Axel Blaze having the struggle of staying in Inazuma National as his father wants him to go to Germany to become a doctor, and more.

== Development ==
At Japan Expo 2013, producer Akihiro Hino confirmed that the Spark and Bomber versions would be released for Nintendo 3DS in Europe on 27 September 2013. The third version (renamed Team Ogre Attacks!) was also announced during the Nintendo Direct on 13 November 2013 and was released on 13 February 2014.

== Reception ==
Reception

Aggregate scores
Aggregator	Score
GameRankings	69.57%(3DS); 66.89%(3DS); 68%(3DS)
Metacritic	70/100; 72/100

Review scores
Publication	Score
Nintendo Life	7/10
Cubed3	8/10

All three versions of the game had toppled the Media Create's list during the first sales week, selling over half a million copies.

Thomas Whitehead of Nintendo Life has praised its impressive design level but added that there is not enough gameplay value to justify an upgrade.
