= Inazuma Eleven 2 =

2009 video game

- European cover artwork for Inazuma Eleven 2: Firestorm
- Developer: Level-5
- Publishers: JP: Level-5; EU: Nintendo
- Director: Takehiro Fujii
- Producer: Akihiro Hino
- Composer: Yasunori Mitsuda
- Series: Inazuma Eleven
- Platforms: Nintendo DS, Nintendo 3DS
- Release: Nintendo DS: JP: October 1, 2009; EU: March 16, 2012; Nintendo 3DS: JP: December 27, 2012
- Genres: Role-playing, sports
- Modes: Single-player, multiplayer

Inazuma Eleven 2 (Note: Japanese: イナズマイレブン2 脅威の侵略者, Hepburn: Inazuma Irebun 2: Kyoui no Shinryakusha; lit. 'Lightning Eleven 2: The Threat of the Invader') is a 2009 role-playing sports video game developed and published by Level-5 for the Nintendo DS. It was released in Japan on October 1, 2009, and in Europe on March 16, 2012, by Nintendo. It is the sequel to Inazuma Eleven. There are two versions of the game, Firestorm (Fire in the Japanese version) and Blizzard.

Both versions of this game were included in an updated re-release compilation titled Inazuma Eleven 1-2-3: Endou Mamoru's Legend for the Nintendo 3DS, released on December 27, 2012, in Japan. A direct sequel to the game titled Inazuma Eleven 3 was released in Japan for the Nintendo DS in 2010. A manga based on the game began serialization in CoroCoro Comic, while an anime TV season based on the game, produced by OLM, started airing on April 8, 2009.

== Plot ==
The main character, Mark Evans (円堂 守 Endō Mamoru), is a very talented goalkeeper. He plays for his high school's soccer team called Raimon Junior High, which has just won the Football Frontier. One day, the aliens from Alius Academy, a mysterious school that trains its students into making soccer a tool to destroy other schools, approach and wreck Raimon Junior High, sending the Raimon Eleven into a journey to stop the aliens, the soccer team named Gemini Storm, with Raimon Eleven's last gift, the van called the Inazuma Caravan. The heroes have to travel around Japan, recruit new players, seek the secret behind the Alius Academy and save Japan from being destroyed.

== Gameplay ==
=== Story mode ===
The game is fundamentally the same as the first one; players take control of Mark and his team in an overworld collecting items, improving stats at training points and partaking in random encounters. Scouting and recruiting players has been moved to the Inazuma Bus, where players can contact Coach Hillman to search for people by name or other criteria. The connection map is also located on the bus, in the form of a small machine at the front.

The main hub of the game is the aforementioned Inazuma Bus, where players can restore their FP and TP, as well as travel to other regions of Japan. The game contains nine regions to explore in total, each with its own story arc and set of players to collect. These regions are unlocked as the story progresses.

The matches are also near identical to the first game; players control their team with the stylus, and initiate a command duel when they run into the opposition. The result of the player's actions in a duel is determined by their form (which is decided by their stats, element, and the total number of players participating in the duel). It is possible for the player to call a time-out mid-match to plan movements, fire-up to boost their performance, or charge quickly forward at the cost of FP (Fitness Points).

Special abilities return, which can be used in place of basic maneuvers at the cost of TP (Technical Points), but can now be developed and get stronger the more they are used. Mega Moves are also introduced, which are incredibly powerful but have a high TP cost.

Two other mechanics introduced to matches in Inazuma Eleven 2 are "long-distance shooting" and "blocking". At any time during a match, the player can tap the "S" button at the top-right of the screen, causing whoever has the ball to automatically shoot, no matter where they are on the pitch. Also, if a special move is marked with an "L", then they can use that move when shooting this way. Likewise, if a player has a special move marked with a "B", then they can intercept the opposing team's shots if they are within range, either powering them down or stopping them entirely.

Another new mechanic introduced in this game is "alter-egos". Before a match begins, some characters can have their characteristics, stats, and special moves switched to a different set if they have an alter-ego. For example, one of the new characters introduced in this game, Shawn Froste, is usually a defender with a high "Guard" stat and blocking moves, but has an alter-ego which is a striker with a high "Kick" stat and shooting moves.

=== Connect mode ===
Players are able to take each other on via wireless mode. Throughout the story mode they can make their own wireless mode team name.

== Reception ==
Reception

Aggregate scores
Aggregator	Score
GameRankings	71.33% 72.57%
Metacritic	74/100

Review scores
Publication	Score
Eurogamer	8/10
GameSpot	5/10
Nintendo Life	8/10
Cubed3	9/10

Both Inazuma Eleven 2: Blizzard and Inazuma Eleven 2: Firestorm did not perform quite as well as the first game in the UK market when they entered the Chart Track UK Nintendo DS Full Price Top 40 in the week ending March 17, 2012. The former started off at No. 15 and the latter at No. 17 and failed to even make the general All Format Top 40 for that week. For reference, the original Inazuma Eleven on Nintendo DS entered the Full Price Nintendo DS UK chart in the week ending 27 August 2011 at No.3, which equated to a No.25 debut position in the Top 40 Entertainment Software (Full Price) list.

UK website Cubed3 scored the game 9/10, with Operations Director Adam Riley claiming, "Level-5 has once more delivered a sterling effort in this addictive series" and that "...anyone that even marginally enjoyed the first title should pick this up without hesitation."
