= Inazuma Eleven season 3 =

Inazuma Eleven
- Season 3
- Cover of the third DVD compilation of Inazuma Eleven released by Geneon Entertainment.
- No. of episodes: 60

Release
- Original network: TV Tokyo
- Original release: February 3, 2010 – April 27, 2011

Series chronology
- ← Previous; Season 2 Next → GO

The third and final season of Inazuma Eleven aired on Tokyo TV from February 3, 2010, to April 27, 2011, on TV Tokyo. The season is based on Level-5's Inazuma Eleven 3 video game. The season was produced by OLM under the direction of Katsuhito Akiyama and consists of 60 episodes. In the season, the new tournament, Football Frontier International was announced, and Inazuma Japan was formed. They faced off against players from all over the world, and even 'people' from heaven and hell.

The opening theme for episodes 88 to 107 is "GOOD Kita!". And the final opening theme starting from episode 108 is "Bokura no Goal!". Closing theme for episodes 88 to 101, and "Shining Power" is the closing theme for episodes 102 to 112.The final closing theme from episode 113 to the end of the series is "Mata ne... no Kisetsu" and was performed by Inazuma All Stars, consisting of Junko Takeuchi, Yuka Nishigaki, Hiroyuki Yoshino, Hirofumi Nojima, and Mamoru Miyano.

Inazuma Eleven was licensed for an English dub by Arait Multimedia S.A. and all episodes of the season were dubbed for an international releases.

== Episode list ==
No.	English title (Translated title)	Original release date	English air date
68	"Gather Together! Team Japan!"; Transliteration: "Shūketsu! Nippon Daihyō!!" (Japanese: 集結!日本代表!!)	February 3, 2010	October 26, 2011
The greatest competition in history, the Football Frontier International, is here. Players from around the world have their eyes fixed upon it, aiming for the world's best. And, of course, so are Japan's. Coach Hibiki has gathered many players: some from Raimon, others from their friends' and rivals' schools, a few are old enemies from Aliea Gakuen, and some are complete strangers too. Japan's twenty-two candidates compete in a selection match to decide its representatives.
69	"The Birth of Inazuma Japan!"; Transliteration: "Tanjō! Inazuma Japan!!" (Japanese: 誕生!イナズマジャパン!!)	February 10, 2010	October 27, 2011
The game that will decide who gets to represent Japan is going to start. Throughout the match, the players ferociously appeal themselves to be chosen for the national team. However, regardless of the outcome of the game, it's up to the coach to decide which 16 players out of 22 candidates will be chosen for Japan's national team, Inazuma Japan. The players are divided into two teams, first team is of Endou and second is of Kidou. Both team players are determined for their best play in the match. There is a huge crowd came to see the match among them are also the candidates teammates and friends supporting them.As the match started with a whistle, both teams attacked each other with their powerful shoots like Fire Tornado, Tsunami Boost, Wyvern Crash etc. But the goal keepers defended them. Fuyuppe's father was watching the match and each player's ability and tactics with an Eagle eye. On the other side Hiroto scores first goal for team A with his Ryuusei Blade. After a few minutes Gouenji makes it equal from team B by shooting Bakunetsu Storm. The first half ends when Someoka with his Wyvern Crash makes it 2-1. Second half starts and continues the high end battle between the teams, score was tied when Midorikawa from team B shoot Astro Break into the goal. Endou's team won the match when Fubuki's Wolf Legend went straight into the goal. At the time to make the decision, Coach Hibiki introduced Fuyuppe's father, Kudou Michiya as the new coach in FFI for Inazuma Eleven. Coach Kudou announced the 16 selected players to represent Japan. Now, it was the start of a new Inazuma Japan.
70	"The Cursed Coach!"; Transliteration: "Norowareta Kantoku!" (Japanese: 呪われた監督!)	February 17, 2010	October 28, 2011
The first day of Inazuma Japan's practice starts. Toramaru arrives late because he is not staying with the rest of the team, claiming that he can't sleep outside his house. Because of that, Fudou mocks him about being childish, which annoyed everyone else. Then the coach comes, and introduces Fuyuka to the team as a new manager. When Fuyuka starts calling Endou "Mamoru-kun," Endou thought that Fuyuka has regained her memories, but she hasn't yet. Later, Kudou explains that the team has a far way to go, and they started practicing. As they practice, they suddenly realized the strict nature of the new coach. After practice, Hiroto approached Endou and asks about the coach, and Endou replies to Hiroto's question by saying that Kudou is a good coach.The next day of the practice, Fudou violently tackles Kazemaru and steals the ball from him. Despite everybody's reaction, Kudou gives him a good remark. Later at the Rairaiken shop, Endou, Kazemaru, Kabeyama, and Kurimatsu seem depressed after the training, and are served with ramen and charsiu. In the third day of practice, Haruna and Megane sneak into the Junior High Soccer Association Headquarters to learn more about Kudou. They discover that Coach Kudou was rumored to be the "Cursed Coach." Later, Endou sees Someoka practicing, so he could later join the team, knowing about the FFI's special rule, where teams can change representatives between matches. Then the next night, they found out that Japan will play against the Australia's team, the Big Waves. The next day, they are told that they won't be practicing, and instead are being ordered to remain in their small rooms.
71	"Raise the Curtain! A Challenge to the World!"; Transliteration: "Kaimaku! Sekai e no Chōsen!!" (Japanese: 開幕!世界への挑戦!!)	February 24, 2010	October 31, 2011
No matter what Endou and the others do, Coach Kudou won't let them out of the building they stay at. But for some reason, he lets Toramaru go home. Tsunami successfully sneak out when the coach isn't present, but Endou and the others aren't so lucky. Meanwhile, a group of people come looking for Tobitaka, and Kudou gave him permission to go out. Endou is so impatient that he starts practicing in his room, and soon all the others do so too. Finally the day of the match come, and Inazuma Japan are quickly overwhelmed by Big Waves Hissatsu tactics: Box Lock Defense. Will they be able to break the defense before the match is over?
72	"Overcome Big Wave!"; Transliteration: "Biggu Weibu o Norikoero!" (Japanese: ビッグウェイブを乗り越えろ!)	March 3, 2010	November 1, 2011
The match of Inazuma Japan and Big Waves continues, but with one point in the lead favored to Big waves. Kidou Yuuto finally breaks through the hissatsu Tactic; Box Lock Defense but it seems that the strategy now changes. Will Japan pull through the match? Will Tsunami Jousuke be able to complete his new shoot hissatsu and will Endou Mamoru be able to block the shoot hissatsu; Megalodon?
73	"Scorching Warriors! Desert Lion!"; Transliteration: "Shakunetsu no Senshi! Dezāto Raion!!" (Japanese: 灼熱の戦士!デザートライオン!!)	March 10, 2010	November 2, 2011
Inazuma Japan next game is against Qatar's team, Desert Lion. Everything seems to be fine as the first half ends with Japan taking a two-point lead. But what they don't know is that they have unknowingly fallen into Desert Lion's trap!
74	"Awaken, Sleeping Tiger!!"; Transliteration: "Nemureru Tora! Mezameru Toki!!" (Japanese: 眠れる虎!目覚める時!!)	March 17, 2010	November 3, 2011
Hiroto and Tsunami were too much fatigued that they were switched by Tachimukai and Tobitaka. Fubuki was also fatigued but pushed on and used Wolf Legend again to shoot but it was blocked by the catch hissatsu; Storm Rider and Fubuki finally was too fatigued that he fainted on the field. Bjorn Kyle acknowledged them to stay this long but he stated that they can withstand this and wondered how long Inazuma Japan can handle this heat.Fubuki was switched by Toramaru and he was able to easily get the ball and got past the opponents. He was about to shoot but he remembered how he was shunned by his old teammates and he passed it back to Gouenji but it was cut off. Tachimukai got the ball off Desert Lion somehow. Fudou kept on complaining to which Kudou stated that if he has a problem, he stated that Fudou should get out of the bench. Toramaru was able to get the ball again and Gouenji said. to Toramaru to shoot but he remembered how he was shunned again and Toramaru passed the ball to Gouenji yet again and he used Bakunetsu Storm to score a goal but was blocked by the catch hissatsu; Storm Rider. Gouenji became angry again that Toramaru didn't shoot. Hibiki stated that Toramaru held back his plays because his old teammates couldn't handle his skillful plays and because of that, he was shunned, so he had no other choice but not to show his true potential. Bjorn Kyle now shot using his shoot hissatsu; Mirage Shoot. Endou blocked it with Seigi no Tekken G3. Though they tried to shoot again, but it was a surprise shoot so it made it through the goal making the score 2-2.Toramaru had the ball again but he passed it again to Gouenji, who finally lashed out his anger at Toramaru and asked why he didn't shoot. He stated that if he kept on only assisting, everyone can score and play happily but Gouenji stated that kind of soccer wasn't fun. He stated that everyone can handle his plays since all of them are the strongest of Japan and that they were now fighting the best of the world so he had to do his real plays. Endou stated that he should play it real and encouraged him. Toramaru asked if it was okay and Gouenji stated that he must try and surprised them. Tobitaka and Kazemaru blocked Desert Lion and Kidou passed the ball to Toramaru. Toramaru amazingly easily got past three defenders. Toramaru now scored a goal using a shoot hissatsu that he stated that he sealed up for a long time called Tiger Drive. It breaks past Storm Rider and scores a goal. Everyone in the team was amazed and happy for Toramaru. Gouenji stated that he still had some catching up to do if that's how serious he played to which he stated that wasn't his serious play. Kidou noticed that his personality had changed. Toramaru stated that Gouenji should get ready since he might get the ace's seat. Kabeyama wondered why he wasn't in the FF to which Toramaru answered that he was only a 6th grader in elementary to which surprised everyone.
75	"A Serious Match! Endō and Tobitaka!!"; Transliteration: "Shinken Shōbu! Endō to Tobitaka!!" (Japanese: 真剣勝負!円堂と飛鷹!!)	March 31, 2010	November 4, 2011
The episode starts with Inazuma Japan practicing and Toramaru showing off his skills. Afterwards, their coach; Kudou Michiya states that they have enough practice but Midorikawa objected though he learned his lesson during the last match and had to rest. Endou Mamoru goes to Tobitaka Seiya and asks if he has also rested with the other teammembers to which Tobitaka states that he prefers to do it alone. Fudou Akio comes in and both Tobitaka and Fudou seemed to almost have a fight but was stopped by Endou. Afterwards, Tobitaka goes to the usual place and practice with Hibiki guiding him. More about Tobitaka's past is revealed when Hibiki states that Tobitaka reminds him of himself when he was young. Tobitaka used to be a gangster and he was cornered and he tried to defeat them all even though he was outnumbered. He was known as "Toby the Kicker" and had strong kicks but because he was outnumbered he was about to be beaten up until Hibiki came in and saved him. Ever since then, Tobitaka was grateful to Hibiki and Hibiki also asked that he should use his kicking skill for a good purpose, mainly he asked that he should play soccer.Later, Endou goes to Rairaken to ask Hibiki some advice so that he can get to know Tobitaka more. Both talk and Endou thanks Hibiki, though when Endou left, Hibiki had a rough time breathing. Later, Endou receives a call from Hibiki and asks him to go to a certain place and that he will know what to do when he arrives. It is revealed that Hibiki was actually in a hospital, this reveals that he has a coronary disease. When Endou reaches the place where Hibiki said that he must go to, he sees Tobitaka practicing but Tobitaka leaves to practice somewhere else. Endou goes to the riverbank in which Tobitaka was practicing and he was determined to help Tobitaka. He states that Tobitaka should view soccer as something fun. Then after some time, with Endou, he masters how to control the ball and how to kick. Tobitaka thanked Endou and asked not to tell anyone of his practice to which Endou understands. Tobitaka remembers what Hibiki said that soccer is fun to which Tobitaka was now more encouraged.
76	"Replacement Representatives!? The Strongest Challengers!"; Transliteration: "Daihyō Kōtai!? Saikyō no Chōsen-sha-tachi!!" (Japanese: 代表交代!?最強の挑戦者たち!!)	April 7, 2010	November 7, 2011
As the episode starts, it first shows Midorikawa, exhausted, practicing alone at the night. He has flashbacks from when Tsunami Jousuke was able to use The Typhoon and score a goal against Big Waves and when Utsunomiya Toramaru made a goal against Desert Lion using Tiger Drive. Due to the improvement of the team, Midorikawa felt that he had to improve also. He tried yet again to shoot shooting but failed and became angry at himself.The next day, Kidou Yuuto explains to the team that they need to create new hissatsu techniques for their final preliminary match. He then states that Kazemaru Ichirouta should learn and master a hissatsu technique because when Kazemaru passed by Tsunami in the selection match, he caused a strong wind. Afterwards, he also asks Fubuki Shirou and Hijikata Raiden to do a combination shoot hissatsu technique. Kidou explained that, with Fubuki's speed and Hijikata's stable body balance, a combination hissatsu technique would be a powerful weapon. Fubuki and Hijikata were encouraged to do so. Midorikawa ate his bread silently watching the team happily talking about creating hissatsu techniques. Tsunami declared that he and Kabeyama should try a combination hissatsu also, and Kidou agreed. Kogure Yuuya snickers that he can't expect that much from this combination, referring to how happy Tsunami is while Kabeyama is worried. Finally, Endou announces that they should start practicing, and everybody happily agreed. Midorikawa placed down his bread thought for a while.Hijikata and Fubuki try creating a shoot hissatsu technique but encounter problems. Fudou is annoyed by Kidou's plan to arrange combination hissatsu, saying "So what about combination hissatsu techniques". Then it is shown that Midorikawa tried to get the ball from Toramaru but fails. Toramaru passes the ball to Tobitaka who failed to intercept it and the ball bounces off to Otonashi Haruna, almost hitting her in the face. Tobitaka then fixes his hair and Megane says that he shouldn't fix his hair all the time. Kiyama Hiroto sees Midorikawa fatigued and worries about him. The scene shifts to Kazemaru creating his hissatsu technique, then to Tsunami and Kabeyama, who are also practicing. After practice, the team is eating at the cafeteria. Kabeyama attempts to finish his food while ignoring Tsunami, but Tsunami encourages him to eat more for the hissatsu effort, causing Kabeyama to lose his appetite. Kogure added spicy sauce to Hijikata's food, making everyone laugh. Midorikawa was about to eat but lost the will to do so; Kiyama asks if he can sit beside Midorikawa. At nighttime, Endou sees both Midorikawa and Kiyama practicing. Midorikawa states that he was weak and he should not have been chosen. Kiyama tells Midorikawa that he was overextending himself and a flashback of Aliea Gakuen members playing soccer appears in Midorikawa's mind. Kiyama encourages Midorikawa to play his own strong soccer and the two continued practicing.During practice the next day, Midorikawa was able to get the ball from Toramaru, claiming that he will play and show his soccer. Fubuki and Hijikata continue practicing their shoot hissatsu, while Kazemaru is also practicing his hissatsu. Tobitaka's unfinished hissatsu develops further as well.The next day, Neo Japan comes and asks to have a match against Inazuma Japan to get the representative seat, surprising everyone. Kudou Michiya agrees to this and the two teams have a match. Kidou admits to Gouenji, "Who would've thought we'd play against Coach Hitomiko like this". Hiroto looks at his "sister" wondering what she is thinking. While conversing, Kidou and Gouenji's notice that Desarm is now a midfielder... Hitomiko remembers her flashback at Sun Garden, especially Desarm's expression when he pleads for her to help him participate in the FFI after he was not invited for the Japan nationals selection match.Meanwhile, Inazuma Japan is having trouble against Neo Japan's surprisingly tight defense. Toramaru sees an opening and passes it to Fubuki who used Wolf Legend, only to have it stopped by Drill Smasher V2. Then Saginuma uses Illusion Ball Kai to get past Kidou. Hijikata uses Super Shikofumi but is blown away by Dash Storm V2. Everyone is shocked that the members of Neo Japan were using the other members' original techniques. Arata then uses Gungnir V2 and gets past Seigi no Tekken G3. Neo Japan leads one point against Inazuma Japan.
77	"Ultimate Showdown! Kudō Japan vs. Hitomiko Japan!!"; Transliteration: "Kyūkyoku Taiketsu! Kudō Japan VS Hitomiko Japan!!" (Japanese: 究極対決!久遠ジャパンVS瞳子ジャパン!!)	April 14, 2010	November 8, 2011
Neo Japan continues to attack aggressively with powered-up hissatsu techniques, and Inazuma Japan can't get past their defense. However, this will only make Endou's passion for soccer grow stronger, and in turn encourage his teammates more. Will this be enough to take down Neo Japan's tough defense?!
78	"Fuyuka's Ultimate Secret Plan!"; Transliteration: "Fuyuka no Kyūkyoku Ōgi Daisakusen!!" (Japanese: 冬花の究極奥義大作戦!!)	April 21, 2010	November 9, 2011
Even though Seigi no Tekken had just evolved, Coach Kudou tells Endou that he'll never make it to the world tournament the way currently is. Endou thinks that the coach is telling him to learn a new Hissatsu, one that surpasses the Seigi no Tekken. Fuyuka notices a troubled Endou and learns some 'tips' from Rika to help him get ideas. What she doesn't know is that Rika is using this opportunity to plan a date for them. Fuyuka found out Rika's plan during the date when all of her 'tips' failed. Their planned 'date' was closely watched by Rika, Touko, Kabeyama, Kurimatsu, Kazemaru and Midorikawa. Then everything is fine in the end. Fuyuka and Endou talk while he trains, she looks at his grandfather's notebook and surprisingly is able to read it. Endou then gets an idea for his new hissatsu.
79	"Gōenji's Determination!"; Transliteration: "Gōenji no Ketsui!" (Japanese: 豪炎寺の決意!)	April 28, 2010	November 10, 2011
Gouenji has a big problem, his father wants him to quit soccer and become a doctor. What's more, he also wants Gouenji to withdraw from going to the nationals and go to Germany instead to study medicine. This is the reason that has kept him from focusing on practice, and interferes with Gouenji and Toramaru's new combo technique, Tiger Storm. And Gouenji's mood is so bad he keeps blaming it on Toramaru. Then, Gouenji's father contacts the chairman of Raimon and requests for Gouenji's withdrawal from Inazuma Japan. And as he is Gouenji's guardian, they cannot refuse him and must follow his wishes. Gouenji also stated that it would not be easy to change his father's mind, regardless of what everybody else thinks. What will Gouenji's decision be? Will he refuse his father or withdraw from the team?
80	"The Last Game"; Transliteration: "Saigo no Shiai" (Japanese: 最後の試合)	May 5, 2010	November 11, 2011
As the Asia finals draw near, Inazuma Japan are training hard to complete their new techniques. While they're practicing, a letter was sent to Endou, which shocks him and the team because the writing on it is similar to Daisuke's. A fight between Tachimukai and Megane has started. Later in the night, Endou runs into Gouenji, and is told by him about his quitting soccer after the next match. Endou tries to persuade Coach Kudou, later Gouenji's father to let him continue soccer, but fails. Coach Kudou then orders them to practice on a mud field till their game with Fire Dragon. Inazuma Japan doesn't understand why they must practicing on the mud field but they are still practicing on the mud field. On the day of the match, while they're on the way to the stadium, they have to stop because of a group of people who are blocking the way.
81	"The Strongest in Asia! Fire Dragon!!"; Transliteration: "Ajia Saikyō! Faiā Doragon!!" (Japanese: アジア最強!ファイアードラゴン!!)	May 12, 2010	November 11, 2011
Though there is trouble, Inazuma Japan manages to get to the stadium in time. At last, the finals against Korea's team, Fire Dragon, has begun. However, Inazuma Japan has some surprises waiting for them. First: Aphrodi, Suzuno and Nagumo are all in Fire Dragon, along with Korea's most highly acclaimed game strategist - Choi Chang Soo. Second: Endou won't be playing because according to Coach Kudou, Coach Kudou told him he doesn't need him, not in this team. Because he doesn't understand the team's situation, therefore he fails as captain. And third: Fire Dragon's powerful tactics which will crush Inazuma Japan, and they have no idea about it!
82	"The Perfect Strategy! Perfect Zone Press!!"; Transliteration: "Kanzen naru Senjutsu! Pāfekuto Zōn Puresu!!" (Japanese: 完全なる戦術!パーフェクトゾーンプレス!!)	May 19, 2010	November 14, 2011
Inazuma Japan manages to score a goal with their new combination shot, Thunder Beast. However, their rejoices are short-lived, because Fire Dragon decides to use Perfect Zone Press which takes down Fubuki and Tsunami, who are then switched out. Things only start to get tough as Fire Dragon now attacks with full power, and turns the tide of the match. And after the first half ends, Coach Kudou decides to switch Fudou in for an injured Kidou, Coach Kudou claims that their opponents doesn't know about Fudou and says that Fudou is "Their Joker". Will this turn the situation around?
83	"Get Up, Captain!"; Transliteration: "Tachiagare Kyaputen!" (Japanese: たちあがれキャプテン!)	May 26, 2010	November 15, 2011
Things aren't looking well for Inazuma Japan: the recently switched-in Fudou isn't working with his teammates, leading them to fight among themselves; Gouenji and Toramaru still can't use Tiger Storm; Tobitaka is still trying too hard not to make mistakes, which causes him to make even more. After seeing all this, and hearing about Fudou's past, Endou is finally able to give his answer, he knew it was his fault that he didn't watch the team, and he steps out to the field. The teamwork between the team and Fudou is finally linked, which lead to them scoring a point. However, Endou has to solve their remaining problems, or they'll never win this game.
84	"Obtain It! The Ticket to the World!!"; Transliteration: "Te ni Irero! Sekai e no Kippu!!" (Japanese: 手に入れろ!世界への切符!!)	June 2, 2010	November 16, 2011
The match starts with Fire Dragon in possession of the ball, Terumi then attempts to score a goal with God Break, but fails since Endou Mamoru blocks it with Seigi no Tekken G5. Megane stated that now Endou is on the field, Endou can block any shoot. But that's when Fire Dragon becomes serious, Terumi then shoots again, but this time he uses Chaos Break instead of God Break and scores a goal again. Fire Dragon is in the lead with 3 goals. Terumi, Suzuno and Nagumo high five as they had secured the point with their combination shoot. Toramaru then talks for a while Gouenji, stating that he does not want the match to end without scoring a goal with Tiger Storm, but Gouenji is still having a hard time to focus. Afterwards, the ball is taken away from Tobitaka and Nagumo charges in but Kabeyama states that he will not move and uses The Mountain to block Nagumo.But Fire Dragon still charges on and they try to use Chaos Break again but Kazemaru dashes in and passes the ball to Tobitaka but fails to get it. Afterwards, Endou talks to Tobitaka and encourages him to try playing with everything he has, and after this, he releases this new hissatsu, Shinkuuma and gets the ball.The ball then passes to Kiyama Hiroto and he evolves Ryuusei Blade further into V2 and scores a goal and ties in with Fire Dragon. But Fire Dragon still continues, and Terumi uses Chaos Break again, but Endou is determined to bring everyone to the international level, so he comes up with a new hissatsu technique, Ikari no Tettsui and blocks Chaos Break. Then, Gouenji and Toramaru try Tiger Storm two times but failed. That's when Endou and the others talk to Gouenji. Then, afterwards, Gouenji is encouraged to try it again, then finally, they score a goal with Tiger Storm and Inazuma Japan is in the lead. But, The captain of Fire Dragon, Choi Chang Soo, says that it isn't over yet, then try to score a goal by using Chaos Break but it is blocked by Ikari no Tettsui. Then, finally Japan won the Asia preliminaries and will advance to the international level.Gouenji's father approaches him and talks to him stating that Gouenji is allowed to still play soccer to which made the team happy, now all that's left is to go to the international level.
85	"It's Here! World Finals!!"; Transliteration: "Kita ze! Sekai Taikai!!" (Japanese: 来たぜ!世界大会!!)	June 9, 2010	November 17, 2011
Inazuma Japan are ready to leave for Liocott Island in the Inazuma Jet. Soon after they arrive, Endou finds a letter from his room from Natsumi. He goes to the beach to meet her, and learns that his grandfather is still alive. Then Endou goes to look for a tire for training, and runs into one of Italy's player. Then the opening ceremony, which marks the beginning of the FFI's World Tournament, begins with ten teams that have won the preliminaries entering one by one. Now the question remains, which one of them will stand at the top of the world?.
86	"Surprise! This is World Class!!"; Transliteration: "Kyōgaku! Kore ga Sekai Reberu da!!" (Japanese: 驚愕!これが世界レベルだ!!)	June 16, 2010	November 18, 2011
Inazuma Japan receives an invitation for a friendly exchange party from their next opponent, England's Knights of Queen. Later, they accept it. While training, Fideo finds Endou and asks to practice together. Later, Argentina's Teres came. Later, America's Mark and Dylan joins them, talking about Ichinose talking big about Endou. While preparing for the party, they found out that Endou isn't with them. Then Aki finds Endou, with other people, playing with them. She watched them play, until she found out that it's already late.Then they hurry to the party grounds. The heel in Aki's shoe got broken, and Endou gave her a piggy-back ride.When they arrived, Endou still wears his jersey. Then Fuyuka introduces both Endou and Edgar to each other, and Edgar calls his butler, Sebastian, to bring Endou a tuxedo and Aki a pair of shoes.As Endou goes out and calls his teammates, Edgar made fun of him, which made everyone unhappy. Endou and Edgar then have a match to see if he can stop Edgar's shoot, but loses because Edgar's Excalibur is too strong for his Ikari no Tettsui. Everyone was shocked seeing Edgar's shoot, but Endou's optimism made everyone more excited for the upcoming match.
87	"The British Knights! The Knights of the Queen!!"; Transliteration: "Eikoku no Kishi! Naitsu Obu Kuīn!!" (Japanese: 英国の騎士!ナイツオブクィーン!!)	June 23, 2010	November 21, 2011
The first match of FFI's Group A, Knights of Queen vs Inazuma Japan, has begun at Umihebi Stadium. Kabeyama and Endou managed to stop Excalibur thanks to the combined power of their techniques. But Inazuma Japan are in for some big troubles. Knights of Queen decide to use their hissatsu tactic, Absolute Knights, making it difficult for Inazuma Japan to attack. And when Edgar uses Excalibur again from a long distance, Kabeyama and Endou's combo plays can't stop it from going into the goal. It seems Excalibur is a shoot that actually grows in power the further it is from the goal. So what will Endou do when Edgar shoots Excalibur that uses the maximum length of the field?
88	"Complete! My Original Finishing Move!!"; Transliteration: "Kansei! Ore Dake no Hissatsu-waza!!" (Japanese: 完成!俺だけの必殺技!!)	June 30, 2010	November 22, 2011
Despite Edgar's strongest Excalibur, Endou saves the goal thanks to Kabeyama's great efforts. But because of that, he suffers a lot of damage, and is taken out. Someoka goes in to replace him, and scores with his new technique. Then, Knights of Queen decides to use their second Hissatsu tactics, Muteki no Yari, protecting Edgar and the ball while making it impossible to approach him. Edgar scores again with another of his technique, and England is in the lead once more. During half time, Endou meets the red cap man again, and he says something that might be an idea for Endou's new technique. But first, Japan must find a way to take down Muteki no Yari if they don't want to lose more goals.
89	"Surpass Mugen the Hand!"; Transliteration: "Mugen za Hando o Koero!" (Japanese: ムゲン・ザ・ハンドを超えろ!)	June 30, 2010	November 23, 2011
Tachimukai is amazed at Endou's new Ijigen The Hand. But this, along with Kogure's remark about Tachimukai copying Endou all the time, makes him determined to create a technique of his own. As a result, Tachimukai throws himself into harsh training. Haruna, later Kabeyama and Kurimatsu, offer to help Tachimukai when they discover him secretly training. Haruna later makes Kogure apologize to Tachimukai and help him train. But because all three are defenders, they can't make good shoots. Haruna then spots Tsunami surfing, so she calls him over to help out. They went a bit overboard, and Tachimukai passes out. But thanks to Endou and the others, Tachimukai regains his courage. And in the next practice, his new technique is starting to manifest. Meanwhile, Fudou runs into a man with sunglasses while jogging.
90	"Teikoku's Curse! Part 1!!"; Transliteration: "Teikoku no Jubaku! Zenpen!!" (Japanese: 帝国の呪縛!前編!!)	July 7, 2010	November 24, 2011
Kidou and Sakuma spot Fudou and the man with sunglasses, so they decide to go search for him to see if he really is Kageyama, but they can't find him. Kidou and Sakuma worry so much about it that they lose focus on practicing including Fudou, this caused coach Kudou to prevent them from training because of their lack of focus. Then, Fudou was nowhere in sight. Thinking that Fudou might try to contact Kageyama again, Kidou goes search for him. Sakuma goes after him too, and while searching, he runs into someone resembling Kidou. Then coincidentally, all three got into a bus, along with Endou who went searching for them and surprise to see Endou entering the bus. What will happen?? Tachimukai is practicing for his original hissatsu technique, Maou The Hand. Haruna, Tsunami, Kogure, Kurimatsu and Kabeyama help Tachimukai practise for his new hissatsu by taking shots at him and trying to inspire him. Kogure propose that they should make Tachimukai angry to fire him up, so Kogure starts mocking him with such words like "you wimpy goalkeeper", "clumsy", "blockhead", "gutless", "bird-brain". Although it might have fired him up at first, and given him a hint towards Maou The Hand, but then they just put him down for real. Tachimukai then tries to think what would Endou do at a time like this.
91	"Teikoku's Curse! Part 2!!"; Transliteration: "Teikoku no Jubaku! Kōhen!!" (Japanese: 帝国の呪縛!後編!!)	July 14, 2010	November 25, 2011
Italy's national team, Orpheus, has come across a big crisis: their coach has been replaced by the man with sunglasses who Endou, Kidou, Sakuma and Fudou are after. The man, calls himself Mr. K, fires Orpheus and replace them with Team K. Orpheus can't accept such an order, so Mr. K gives them a chance: they'll have a match with Team K, whoever wins will be Italy's national team. Soon after, eight of Orpheus's players are injured at roughly the same time, leaving only seven left. Fideo is also in danger, but he is saved by Kidou. He then tells Fideo that Mr. K might be Kageyama, and tells his past to Fideo. Endou then suggests all four of them join Orpheus temporary to help Fideo, but the other three all refuse. They then split up to search for Kageyama. Kidou happens to run into him, and hears that he will destroy Japan's national team. Kidou then decides to join Orpheus with the other three to find out the connection between Mr. K and Kageyama. What will happen in this match??
92	"Terrifying! Another 'Kidou'!"; Transliteration: "Senritsu! Mōhitori no 'Kidō'!!" (Japanese: 戦慄!もう一人の「鬼道」!!)	July 21, 2010	November 28, 2011
Endou and the others have confirmed their fear: Mr. K really is Kageyama. But that's not all, there's a player in Team K who resembles Kidou, not only in looks, but also in abilities, in which he even surpasses Kidou. Even though the new Orpheus made up of members from Inazuma Japan, are doing well as a team, Team K, especially the Kidou look-alike, is displaying overwhelming power. Demonio even scores with Koutei Penguin X, a far more powerful variation of the technique Sakuma used while he was in Shin Teikoku.
93	"Strongest Confrontation! Penguin vs. Penguin!!"; Transliteration: "Saikyō Taiketsu! Pengin VS Pengin!!" (Japanese: 最強対決!ペンギンVSペンギン!!)	July 28, 2010	November 29, 2011
The match that will decide Italy's team continues. Endou determines not to lose more goals, and blocks the second Koutei Penguin X with his own body. Then thanks to their teamwork, he scores with Megaton Head. After this, for some reason Demonio's plays are starting to fall apart. Why is he so obsessed with being the ultimate? The answer startles them. Demonio and the rest of the team were really wanted to be chosen as the representative team, but they lacked the skills, so Kageyama's offer for the ultimate power was irresistible... even with the risks, and one of them was losing eyesight! Will Endou be able to save them, and Orpheus from disbanding?
94	"The Looming Fortress"; Transliteration: "Tachihadakaru Yōsai" (Japanese: 立ちはだかる要塞)	August 4, 2010	November 30, 2011
Because of Mr. K, the match between Inazuma Japan and The Empire got pushed a day earlier. Fideo tried to help Endou and the others get to the boat that will take them to where the match will take place, Yamaneko Stadium. But an accident on the way prevents them from catching the boat on time. Having no captain or coach, Inazuma Japan will have to fight on their own. Endou and the others can do nothing but watching the match on TV. Without Endou or Kidou, Inazuma Japan pushes themselves too much to cover for their absence, causing their plays to fall apart in the process. Hiroto realizes this and pulls them together. However, that wasn't enough to get past Teres' defense. And to their surprise, The Empire changed from a defensive formation to an offensive one, quickly passes Japan's defense and gets the first goal.
95	"Desperate! Inazuma Japan Defeated!?"; Transliteration: "Zettaizetsumei! Inazuma Japan Haiboku!?" (Japanese: 絶体絶命!イナズマジャパン敗北!?)	August 11, 2010	December 1, 2011
The Empire manages to dribble through Inazuma Japan's defences; making quick passes that surprise Inazuma Japan's defenders, for The Empire was known to be a defensive team. Leone shoots Hellfire, and Tachimukai tries to stop it with Mugen The Hand G5, but fails. Aki notes that it should have been expected that The Empire would also have a good offense, for they could not have won all their matches with offence alone. Megane says that since The Empire's defense was so great, their offense ended up not getting as much attention.Inazuma Japan starts with a kickoff. Gordo Díaz uses Zigzag Flame, and steals the ball from Someoka. With The Empire back on the offense, the Inazuma Japan players are pushed back. Leone gets the ball again, and uses Hellfire. Tachimukai tries to use Maou The Hand, but it is incomplete, and The Empire scores.Hiroto passes the ball to Gouenji, but the ball is stolen from him. Kazemaru, determined not to let the ball get to Leone, kicks the ball out of bounds. However, this results in an injury in Kazemaru's leg, and he cannot continue to play. Tachimukai feels it's his fault, because he couldn't block The Empire's shoots. Kurimatsu joins the defense, replacing Kazemaru, and Tobitaka moves up as midfielder.With Hiroto as the captain, the match resumes. Kurimatsu quickly gets the ball, but it's stolen from him and passed to Leone. As Leone advances, Tachimukai worries on what to do. Mugen The Hand doesn't work, and Maou The Hand is incomplete. But Tobitaka tells him not to be afraid, that it's okay to mess up, as long as he gives everything he has. Tachimukai thinks about this. Leone jumps up and shoots Hellfire, and Tachimukai manages to stop it with Maou The Hand. The first half ends with The Empire in a two point lead. The team congratulates Tachimukai on completing his hissatsu; Tachimukai thanks Tobitaka for his help, who says he just thought it was something Endou would say. The second half starts with The Empire's kick-off. They kick the ball deep into Inazuma Japan's field, and Tsunami catches it. Tsunami passes to Gouenji, but Gouenji is quickly surrounded. The Empire uses their hissatsu tactic, Andes no Arijigoku. Surrounded, Gouenji can't pass to anyone. Gouenji moves up with a dribble, managing to keep the ball, but he can't get to his destination. Gouenji tries to score with Bakunetsu Screw, but it goes straight towards Teres, who stops it with his hissatsu, Iron Wall.Someoka retrieves the ball, but gets caught in Andes no Arijigoku. He gets through, but ends up right in front of Teres as well, and has the ball stolen from him. Kidou understands their tactic. The Empire lets the dribbler move up while guiding him towards Teres, like an ant lion dragging down an ant that's fallen into its pit. Whatever shoot Inazuma Japan makes, Teres will be there to stop it. Toramaru shoots with Tiger Drive, but Teres stops it with Iron Wall.Elsewhere, Coach Kudou says that this is good for them. Until now, Inazuma Japan has gone by with Kidou planning their strategies, and with Endou for support. But because of that, the rest of the team have ended up relying on the two. Kudou says they need to use their own abilities to overcome this situation, so they would be worthy to stand at the top of the world.Noticing how everyone's lost hope, Fuyuka runs up. She tells them that the match isn't over yet, so why are they giving up? Isn't it Inazuma Japan's soccer to never give up? Haruna and Aki cheer them on. Kurimatsu asks Hiroto to let the defenders take care of the situation. The defenders say that they'll pass the ball to the forwards, who should stay at a place Teres can't get to. Tachimukai says not to worry that the defense would be left open, because he'll protect the goal. Hiroto agrees. The match resumes with Inazuma Japan's throw-in. Tsunami gets the ball and passes to Kogure, who dribbles up the field. The Empire's members surround him. Kabeyama and Kurimatsu tell him to move more to the right. Kogure manages to pass the ball to Kabeyama. The opposing team surrounds him. Kabeyama manages to get through them and passes to Kurimatsu. The ball is stolen from Kurimatsu, but he gets it back and passes to Gouenji, hurting his foot a bit in the process. Hiroto says it's time for their new technique. He, Gouenji and Toramaru move up and use Grand Fire. Teres moves to stop it but doesn't get there in time, and they score, breaking The Empire's record of no points lost.The match ends soon after, with the score in The Empire's favor.After the match, Endou and the others return an explain everything. Gouenji apologizes because the team couldn't win. Endou tells them to cheer up! There's still hope, they can still win. Kidou says as long as they win all their other matches, they still have a chance. Endou complements them all for their plays. But they say it was because of Fuyuka. She helped them remember how they should never give up until it's over. The episode ends soon after.
96	"Fuyuppe's Secret"; Transliteration: "Fuyuppe no Himitsu" (Japanese: フユッペの秘密)	August 18, 2010	December 2, 2011
At night, in her bedroom, Fuyuka sat on her bed. Coach Kudou was there, too. The next day, Inazuma Japan's private plane landed at the Liocott airport. Someone got off the plane, smiling. Inazuma Japan practiced passionately. Megane explains FFI the game system, and said that if they want to pass the qualification, they should not lose again. When they were training, the ball had rolled out of the field. The ball rolled to someone's feet, who was Fubuki. All members of the Inazuma Japan seemed surprised and happy to see the return of Fubuki. With the return of Fubuki, then someone has to leave the team, who was Kurimatsu. Someoka told him to go home and practice, so he could go back into the team. Then, Inazuma Japan seemed to watch the match between Orpheus and the Knights of the Queen. Orpheus who was initially left behind, managed to take the lead around thanks to the instructions of Mr. K. Knowing this, Endou, Kidou, Sakuma, and Fudou train harder in order not to lose to Kageyama, which made them not being able to practice well. Coach Kudou then told them to stop the exercise to calm down. Since there is no exercise, Endou accompanied Fuyuka to go shopping. Heading home after shopping, a truck almost hit them. They both survived, but Fuyuka fainted after seeing the accident. Then Endou brought Fuyuka to the hospital. At the hospital, Coach Kudou told Endou about Fuyuka's past, that her parents died in a car accident. Fuyuka was very traumatized, so the doctor advised to do hypnotherapy. Therefore Fuyuka lost her childhood memories, and forgot Endou as well. The next day, Kidou and members of other Inazuma Japan apologized to Coach Kudou about their practice yesterday. Finally, that day they returned training. In the afternoon, Aki got a call from Ichinose, asking Aki to meet him somewhere.
97	"Ichinose! The Final Kick-off!!"; Transliteration: "Ichinose! Saigo no Kikkuofu!!" (Japanese: 一之瀬!最後のキックオフ!!)	August 25, 2010	December 5, 2011
Inazuma Japan is fired up for their next match against America's Unicorn, especially Endou. Because they'll get to fight Ichinose and Domon, both of whom have leveled up greatly. The next day, Ichinose calls Aki out, and tells her, he will join a Pro League youth soccer team after the tournament, so he won't lose to them. But what Aki doesn't know is that he lies to her, and in reality, the soccer he loves will be taken from him again!
98	"All-Out Friendship! Ichinose vs. Endō!!"; Transliteration: "Zenryoku no Yūjō! Ichinose VS Endō!!" (Japanese: 全力の友情!一之瀬VS円堂!!)	September 1, 2010	December 5, 2011
Not long after the match starts and Unicorn has the first point because of Ichinose's new Pegasus Shot. The match continues with Ichinose making superior plays, giving Inazuma Japan a hard time. But thanks to Fubuki and Kazemaru's new combo shoot The Hurricane, Japan ties with America. During half time, Endou accidentally finds out about Ichinose's surgery, but decides not to hold back, as a symbol of their friendship.
99	"The Phoenix's Determination"; Transliteration: "Fushichō no Ketsui!" (Japanese: 不死鳥の決意!)	September 8, 2010	December 6, 2011
The tense game between Inazuma Japan and Unicorn continued with neither side wanted to give up. When one team took the lead, the other took it back, this is what the game had become. Unicorn finally decided to use the Hissatsu tactics, Rolling Thunder, continuously attacking Japan's defenders, eventually wore them down. Then, Unicorn scored another goal with Gran Fenrir, bringing them closer to victory. What will Inazuma Japan do to breakthrough this situation?
100	"Miracle! A Kappa Encounter!?"; Transliteration: "Kiseki! Kappa to no Sōgū!?" (Japanese: 奇跡!カッパとの遭遇!?)	September 15, 2010	December 7, 2011
Endou wakes up to go to the bathroom and notices a kappa figure on his way, but when he rubs his eyes, its gone. The next day the others don't believe him with Hiroto telling him it's impossible because kappas are imaginary creatures, therefore don't exist. They all then leave to go to practice with Endou left wondering if it really was a kappa. Inazuma Japan then practices for their upcoming match against Orpheus. During practice the kappa looking boy is seen admiring Hiroto's Ryuusei Blade. After practice, Hiroto decides to go for a short run in the nearby forest, as he thinks his dribbling won't be able to break past Orpheus' defense. Kogure Yuuya, had been looked down by Someoka Ryuugo earlier on, pulls a prank on the latter. He ends up being chased after by an angry Someoka, and runs into the same forest Hiroto is currently in. While practicing Hiroto notices a kappa looking boy watching him from behind a tree. Before he can do anything he hears Kogure calling for help and runs to see what's wrong. He then finds Kogure wrapped in vines. They encounter a kappa-looking boy, who wants an autograph from Hiroto. Both Hiroto and Kogure decide to camp out in the forest because they can't find a way back. The next morning, they met the kappa boy from before, along with his friend. They lead Hiroto and Kogure to a soccer field, and wanted to play with them. These fans aren't what they appeared to be, however. Hiroto and Kogure are having troubles as they lost more and more points, but maybe that will help Hiroto develop the flexibility he needs.
101	"Duel! Tiger and Hawk!!"; Transliteration: "Gekitotsu! Tora to Taka!!" (Japanese: 激突!虎と鷹!!)	September 22, 2010	December 8, 2011
Firstly, after practicing, the Inazuma Japan members receive letters from their friends and family from their hometown. They received some letters from Midorikawa, and surprisingly a really long letter from Saginuma to which they just showed a funny expression when they read it. Also Tobitaka received a note and photo of his friends encouraging him to which he smiled. Finally, Toramaru received a letter but he looked pale when he read it. During the practice, he couldn't concentrate to which the other members suggested him to concentrate to which he answered with an angry reply and stormed off. At night, Endou decided to talk to him about his problem, surprisingly, Tobitaka said he'll talk to Toramaru instead. Toramaru, outside was still worried about the letter he received and was surprised that Tobitaka came to talk to him to which Toramaru stated that Tobitaka wouldn't understand his situation though after some talking, Toramaru stated what the letter he contained stated. Apparently his mother's sickness is worse than before and Toramaru is feeling guilty because he is faraway from his mother. Tobitaka gave some advice and Toramaru smiled and removed his tears. The next day, Toramaru learns a new hissatsu called RC Shoot.
102	"Memories Return! The Truth of Fuyuka!!"; Transliteration: "Yomigaeru Kioku! Fuyuka no Shinjitsu!!" (Japanese: よみがえる記憶!冬花の真実!!)	October 6, 2010	
Inazuma Japan is in a worrying situation: only the top two teams in each group will pass the prelims, and their next opponent is currently in first place. If they don't win this, it's likely that Japan won't pass the prelims. Therefore, Coach Kudou decides to hold a practice game with Spain's Red Matador, who is also in the same situation. During the game, Fuyuka keeps seeing the image of Endou's young self. After the game, Fuyuka finds Endou at the beach training, and talk to him about the game. Suddenly, her memories comes back. And eventually, she remembers the accident which took away her parents. Unable to bear it, Fuyuka falls into a coma. Is there no way to save her other than to use hypnotherapy again? Is there nothing Endou can do to keep Fuyuka from having to forget him and the others over again?
103	"Battle at Last! Fidio's Decision!"; Transliteration: "Iyoiyo Kessen! Fidio no Ketsui!!" (Japanese: いよいよ決戦!フィディオの決意!!)	October 13, 2010	
Inazuma Japan are preparing for their match against Orpheus, as the important game will take place tomorrow. Then Fuyuka is seen talking with Furukabu about something that is not yet revealed but they said that if they found it is would change the power balance of the world tournament. Then while training Kidou has a flashback of him talking to Kageyama who told him that he will destroy Inazuma Japan at Italy's area. The Italian team is seen training with Mr. K but no one other than Fideo could complete Kageyama's training, The rest of the team thought this training had no meaning because even though they won against England they tied with America because of Mr. K's commands, they still don't acknowledge him as their coach. And couple with the fact that they heard about the bad things he had done to Endou and others, they decided that they will fight using their own soccer. Later on Fideo is seen receiving package from the captain. It was a video of a match between the Japan National team and the Korean National team and Fideo was amazed by Japan's plays. The next day, the match between Orpheus and Inazuma Japan begins, and gets intensify almost immediately after it'd started. But Orpheus seems to have a fight between Fideo and the rest, which is why Japan makes the first point so soon.
104	"Strongest Tactics! Catennacio Counter!!"; Transliteration: "Saikyō Takutikusu! Katenachio Kauntā!!" (Japanese: 最強タクティクス!カテナチオカウンター!!)	October 20, 2010	
After Inazuma Japan's early goal, many of Orpheus's members still didn't want to listen to Fideo because he trusts Mr. K, which is why Japan continued to get the better of them. Though Fideo even saved them from potentially losing another point, most of them didn't seem to appreciate what he has done and didn't listen to his orders. Fideo, believing Mr. K could take them to a new level, begged his team to put their trust in him for five minutes, which they accept, because Blasi said that they will agree with it. Whatever was on everyone's mind, they'll be shocked at the plays Fideo is going to pull out, and the Hissatsu tactics which even shake Mr. K from his composure!
105	"Decisive! Endō vs. Fidio!!"; Transliteration: "Nettō! Endō VS Fidio!!" (Japanese: 熱闘!円堂VSフィディオ!!)	October 27, 2010	
Fideo's plays which is out of this world, Kageyama and the past he's been freed from, and Orpheus which has become complete as a team, all of which has allow Italy to complete the powerful hissatsu tactic: Catenaccio Counter. Not only they block every one of Inazuma Japan's attacks, they also takes the lead with Fideo's Odin Sword. Unless Japan break through Catenaccio Counter, they won't have a chance at victory.
106	"The Final Battle! Kageyama Reichi!!"; Transliteration: "Saigo no Kessen! Kageyama Reichi!!" (Japanese: 最後の決戦!影山零治!!)	November 10, 2010	
The match between Inazuma Japan and Orpheus now heads into the second half. Italy's captain, Hide Nakata, has finally returned, which give the rest of the team an emotional boost. They even evolved Catenaccio Counter with Nakata joining them. There's no doubt that Italy's team right now is the strongest ever. How will Japan handle this absolutely flawless Orpheus? And what will Kageyama's fate be after this game?
107	"Grandpa's Last Note!"; Transliteration: "Jī-chan no Saigo no Nōto!" (Japanese: じいちゃんの最後のノート!)	November 17, 2010	
The last game in Group A, The Empire vs Unicorn, are coming to an end with The Empire in the lead. Since the match between Inazuma Japan and Orpheus has ended in a tie, Orpheus has been guaranteed first place in Group A, while Japan are anxiously waiting for the results as they couldn't advance with their own wins. Unicorn doesn't make it in the end, meaning Japan can go to the finals tournament. The good news doesn't stop there, Daisuke's last notebook has made it way to Endou thanks to Fuyuka's memories and the help of Natsumi. However, it doesn't have ideas for Hissatsu techniques, but contains sayings which gave Fuyuka's dad courage and strength of heart. Though they don't know what those sayings mean, they definitely take them seriously as Kidou said that as long as they keep those words in mind, they'll be able to figure it out somehow. Meanwhile, Touko and Rika are planning to pay them a surprise visit.On the way, Rika stops to buy more souvenirs from two old men, who give them two bracelets called "the keys to the legend" for free. Rika put one on, only to find out later that she can't take it off, the same goes for Otonashi when Touko give her the other one. Just what are these bracelets supposed to be? It seems another great drama is about to begin!
108	"The Legend of Raiokotto Island!"; Transliteration: "Raiokotto-tō no Densetsu!" (Japanese: ライオコット島の伝説!)	November 24, 2010	
After hearing about the legend of Liocott Island from Natsumi, and seeing the similarity between the two bracelets and the ones wore by the heaven and hell dwellers, Inazuma Japan goes back to practice. Later, they're visited by Fideo Ardena, who brought along Teres, Mark, Dylan, and Edgar. All of them come to express their wish for Italy and Japan's victory. They then decided to have a game with the five visitors and Touko join in to make twenty two players. Just when they start, thunder roars and clouds start rolling in when it was supposed to be sunny all day. Then the two bracelets, worn by Rika and Haruna started glowing, followed by a lightning strike, and a being with a strange outfit, Sein, appeared. Sein then hypnotized Rika to come with him, but Endou interfered. Annoyed, Sein shoots a ball straight to Endou, getting him out of his way. Then another one with a different outfit, Desuta, appeared to take Haruna, which Kidou interfered, but was then hurt by Desuta and Haruna was hypnotized as well. Later, Sein and Desuta have a conversation, in which some words indicate they're from heaven and hell. After that, both of them disappeared, taking Rika and Haruna along. Then, everyone was shocked and remembered of what Natsumi told them before. Was the legend of Liocott Island true after all?
109	"Messengers of the Sky!"; Transliteration: "Tenkū no Shito!" (Japanese: 天空の使徒!)	December 1, 2010	
The episode begins with the Red Team running on the path to Heaven's Garden in order to save Rika. While staying at Heaven's Garden's palace, Rika tries to find a way to escape. She attempts to do so by going out of the window, however she stops because of the height. Ekadel then enters the room, noticing that Rika is awake. Rika then gets scared as he notices the open window, however he closes it and says that the morning breeze isn't good for her health. Enolel and Sakinel then enter the room with a tray of food, which Ekadel explains that it's Rika's breakfast. She is hesitant to eat at first but then gives in and enjoys the food. Ekadel then tells Rika to come with them to the purification room once she has finished eating to change into her demon bride clothes. While Sein is looking at a mural somewhere in the palace, Winel comes in and tells him that the revival of the demon lord has finally come. Sein then questions why their ancestors used soccer to settle their battles with the demons. Upon the Red Team's, Elfel comes in and tells Sein that they have guests. As the Red Team finally arrives at Heaven's Garden, Winel states that they can't start the ritual with them interfering. When the Red Team sees Sein and his accomplices, Sein declares to them that they should leave in which they refuse. Sein then explains that Rika is to be wed to the demon lord, which shocks the Red Team. After arguing, Tenkuu no Shito and the Red Team have a soccer match. During the match, the Red Team has a hard time playing against Tenkuu no Shito and Sein quickly scores a goal using Heaven Drive. His shot leaves the Red Team astonished at Tenkuu no Shito's power. After some of the Red Team's members successfully pass Tenkuu no Shito's, Edgar tries to score a goal with Excalibur but Enolel stops it using Holy Zone. The Red Team then starts block and intercept Tenkuu no Shito's passes and Kazemaru manages to use Fuujin no Mai. He then passes to Fideo, who successfully scores a goal using Odin Sword. During half-time, Sein says that they underestimated the Red Team and it was time to show them the true power of heaven.During the second-half, Tenkuu no Shito shows their true power which gives the Red Team a hard time. Guel then shoots multiple times at Endou to tire him. This ceases as Touko manages to stop one of her shots using The Tower. As Sein uses Heaven Drive again, Edgar runs towards it in order to reflect it using Excalibur. Rika then pleads to him not to do it, since he'll will get severely injured. Edgar then says that he'll risk his leg in order to protect a lady and uses Excalibur. Tenkuu no Shito is left astonished and Excalibur makes a goal, resulting in the Red Team's victory with a score of 2-1. Rika is then released and runs to Edgar, whose leg luckily didn't break. After losing, Sein finally realizes why his ancestors used soccer in their battles as Rika tells him soccer is the clashing of souls against souls. He then thanks Endou and states that his team will use their fierce souls in order to seal the demon lord. Now the Red Team had Otonashi to worry about as Endou says "we're counting on you, Kidou".
110	"Demon Army Z!"; Transliteration: "Makai Gundan Z!" (Japanese: 魔界軍団Z!)	December 8, 2010	
The White Team heads for Demon's Gate, where Makai Gundan Z is, to rescue Haruna. These guys want her to be a sacrifice to revive the demon lord. Of course, Kidou won't allow them to have their way with his sister, so a game is inevitable. But it soon becomes clear that the devils' monstrous power is too much for them and time is ticking. Can they save Haruna?
111	"The Devil's Decent! Dark Angel!!"; Transliteration: "Maō Kōrin! Dāku Enjeru!!" (Japanese: 魔王降臨!ダークエンジェル!!)	December 15, 2010	
Endou and others has saved both Rika and Otonashi, but it's not over yet. There's still one more obstacle to overcome: Dark Angel, the fusion of heaven and hell, and the demon lord himself. Inazuma Japan has to fight another battle with their souls on the line, which are what Dark Angel wants in order to make themselves even more perfect as the demon lord. Endou and others quickly finds themselves struggling against the destructive power of Dark Angel. Will they all perish? Or will they live to go to the finals?
112	"The Kingdom's Darkness!"; Transliteration: "Za Kingudamu no Yami!" (Japanese: ザ・キングダムの闇!)	December 22, 2010	
The final match in Group B: Brazil's The Kingdom vs France's Rose Griffon, has ended with The Kingdom winning overwhelmingly. This amazing team is also Inazuma Japan's opponent in the semi-finals. Everyone, especially Endou, are excited to play against them. But their captain, Mac Roniejo, comes to Endou with a shocking proposal. He wants Inazuma Japan to lose in the semi-finals. They find out that Garshield told the players that they have to win every match, or else something will happen to their families. Hijitaka, Endou, Hiroto and Kidou sneak in and copy the data from Brazils camp base. It seems that Garshield had planned to take over the world? what will happen?
113	"Garshield's Conspiracy!"; Transliteration: "Garushirudo no Inbō!" (Japanese: ガルシルドの陰謀!)	January 5, 2011	
Inazuma Japan are astonished by the data they stole from Garshield's mansion, which revealed his plan to take over the world. If they give the data to the police, Garshield will definitely go to jail, and The Kingdom will be able to play their own soccer. Coach Hibiki volunteers to take the data to the police, while Endou and Hijikata go to tell The Kingdom good news. However, Hibiki wasn't able to do it because he has another chest pain while he had some as shown in various episodes before, which was caused by a heart condition. Nonetheless, the data made it to the police. But to their horror, Garshield appears at the stadium where the match will begin. He had pulled the string with the police and got away and as soon as the match starts, Roniejo's expression becomes odd. Has the plan RH begun?
114	"Inazuma Japan vs. The Kingdom"; Transliteration: "Inazuma Japan VS Za Kingudamu" (Japanese: イナズマジャパンVSザ・キングダム)	January 12, 2011	
Everytime Roniejo hears a special whistle he acts different and can't seem to shoot correctly! His teammates worry about him, as he gets angry whenever someone touches him, and so does Inazuma Japan because they both understand that it is unlikely for Roniejo to steal the ball from his teammates, which he does in the game. So they leave their mark on the forwards and stop Roniejo from getting the ball. It is revealed that the whistle activates the RH program. Later the detective arrests Garshield and Brazil is able to play their own soccer. However before he left Garshield threatened all the players families.
115	"The Soccer Kingdom's Revenge!"; Transliteration: "Sakkā Ōkoku no Gyakushū!" (Japanese: サッカー王国の逆襲!)	January 19, 2011	
The match continues from the previous episode, however, Roniejo and the others from The Kingdom seem to not be able to find the will to play, only making small passes between each and not attempting to shoot. After scoring one point, Hijikata tells Roniejo not to worry about his family and that they sent him here to play soccer not because they could keep their jobs but because they wanted him and his teammates to be able to play soccer. Roniejo is then convinced and begins to show off his true abilities. The skills of both teams evolved to a greater level and this episode is also the debut of a new hissatsu technique: The Birth, a shot performed by Kiyama Hiroto and Fubuki Shirou. Inazuma Japan wins with a score of 3-2 and will now proceed to the finals against either Orpheus or Little Gigant.
116	"Amazing! Little Gigant!!"; Transliteration: "Kyōi! Ritoru Giganto!!" (Japanese: 驚異!リトルギガント!!)	January 26, 2011	
Inazuma Japan hurries to the match of Orpheus Vs. Little Gigant to see if Fideo's team has won. Though when they reached the match it already ended and it had a surprising score... it was 0-8 and Orpheus lost and hadn't score a single goal to which the Inazuma Japan members could not believe. Then after the match, Endou went inside the room of the Orpheus seeing them badly beaten with bruises. Also all of the members seemed to be down at spirits. He sees that Hidetoshi Nakata was comforting them to which Endou comforted them also. Fideo stated that the match was a hard match. Firstly he stated that the goalkeeper of Little Gigant did not even use a hissatsu to block the hissatsu of Raffaele. Then Fideo stated that he wants to fight Endou in the finals no matter what, so even though Fideo was tired he tried getting a goal by using Odin Sword but the goalkeeper just blocks it even without a hissatsu. After that Fideo states that he doesn't have the right to become the captain of Orpheus and wanted to give back the position to Nakata but Nakata stated that he should keep the position. Though even with Endou comforting, Orpheus was still depressed with their loss. The next day, Endou sees Natsumi in Liocott Airport and is surprised that Natsumi is now a manager of Little Gigant.
117	"Attack! The Ultimate Enhanced Humans!"; Transliteration: "Shūgeki! Kyūkyoku no Kyōka Ningen!!" (Japanese: 襲撃!究極の強化人間!!)	February 2, 2011	
Suddenly, a mysterious group attacks the Cotarl's area on Liocott island. Little Gigant and Inazuma Japan rushes off to help and is surprised to see that Garshield is there and he brought his own soccer team! Then Endou finds out that the coach of Little Gigant, Mr. Araya is actually his grandfather, Endou Daisuke! Then Garshield challenges Inazuma Japan to a match. What will they do?
118	"The Terrifying Team Garshield!"; Transliteration: "Kyōfu no Chīmu Garushirudo!!" (Japanese: 恐怖のチームガルシルド!)	February 9, 2011	
Endou Mamoru is not able to block the Garshield's enhanced human team attacks with his 真 Ijigen The Hand and his teammates are working hard in the field to make the goal. On the other side Endou Daisuke, Rococo, Natsumi and others are hoping that the team will be able to show something to the enemy. Natsumi is calmly observing Team Garshield's weaknesses and making strategies in her mind as Daisuke advised her. Inazuma Japan is not able to put the ball into the goal even with their new hissatsu tactics Dual Typhoon, as the goalkeeper of Team Garshield blocks Toramaru's Gladius Arch, after which team Garshield's captain goes for the goal. Now all eyes were focused on Endou if he will he be able to block the shoot, just at that time Daisuke shouts these words to Endou "GAN SHAN DWAN". Endou starts thinking about the words after which he gets the point to gather energy and suddenly unleashes the power inside him, tried to stop the coming shoot. But the new move was less powerful to stop the ball as it goes straight into the goal, after which the first half ends. Now all the players gathers and Endou Daisuke tells them the strategy that Natsumi made during the first half. All the players were shocked when they heard the strategy, according to that Tobitaka and Kabeyama will go as forwards and the forwards Gouenji and Toramaru will be midfielders, Fudou and Kazemaru will go as defenders. Because leaving physical abilities Team Garshield have a weakness that their forwards acts as forwards, midfielders plays as midfielder and defenders do the work of defenders. As their complete separation of roles their defenders lack the abilities of a midfielder to keep the ball and or bringing it up to front. To break through that mixing up defenders and midfielders is important. So, according to the strategy as the second half started players went to their positions. They scored with Tiger Storm, The Hurricane and Grand Fire G2 respectively.
119	"The Strongest Rival!"; Transliteration: "Saikyō no Raibaru!" (Japanese: 最強のライバル!)	February 16, 2011	
Rococo Urupa's past was finally revealed as he tells his story to Endou. Endou is still practicing to find the key to the new hissatsu. Gouenji and Toramaru try a new hissatsu too and Rococo shows Endou he has the same hissatsu like him! God Hand. Endou was surprised. Rococo's hissatsu is stronger than his. Will Endou give up? Will he find the key of the hissatsu in this episode?
120	"Fidio's Great Friendship Training!"; Transliteration: "Fidio no Yūjō Daitokkun!" (Japanese: フィディオの友情大特訓!)	February 23, 2011	
Fideo Ardena thinks about the recent match their team, Orpheus, had against Little Gigant, and how he lost in the end, even though he used Odin Sword. He remembered the score match, it was 8-0 and Orpheus lost. Fideo laments that he cannot fight Endou Mamoru and Inazuma Japan in the finals anymore. The next day, Endou Mamoru practices and tries to create a new hissatsu technique for their finals match. He tries by practicing with a tire again but fails. Fideo slowly approached Endou, and when Endou turned around he saw Fideo. Kidou Yuuto and Sakuma Jirou practiced by running around and they saw Gigi Blasi and the whole Orpheus team. Fideo asks Endou to carry on for them and win the match as the number 1 team in the world. Endou and Fideo talk and afterwards Fideo states that he came to help because of Blasi's suggestion to help out Inazuma Japan.Gigi and Fideo explains that the movements of Little Gigant were without excess and their speed was terrifying. When they tried their tactic, it didn't work. To win against them, they had to suppress the power and speed of Little Gigant.Orpheus will have match against Inazuma Japan to show them how Little Gigant fights. Though, it will only be a 15 minutes match. Kidou is shocked at the formation of Little Gigant has and watches the match closely. Fideo scores the first goal with Odin Sword Kai. Endou's hissatsu is still incomplete and was unable to catch the hissatsu.After watching the match closely, Kidou comes in the field and was able to break through the defense line and use Koutei Penguin 3gou G2 and Gouenji Shuuya uses Shin Bakunetsu Screw creating a chain shoot and score a goal even when Blasi used Colosseo Guard Kai. Fideo afterwards scores another goal and Endou's hissatsu is still incomplete. Fideo encourages Endou one more time and talks about Endou's hissatsu techniques. Fideo then shoots again, this time surprising everyone when they saw it evolve to Shin Odin Sword. Endou then tries to block it with a much more visualized hissatsu but it is still incomplete. Though, Endou still thanks Fideo for the training and because he finally had a grasp of his hissatsu. Everyone thanks Orpheus and the team wishes them best of luck for their upcoming match against Little Gigant
121	"To the Top of the World! The 11 Words!"; Transliteration: "Sekaiichi e! 11 no Kotoba!!" (Japanese: 世界一へ!11の言葉!!)	March 2, 2011	
Inazuma Japan received a video call from Raimon in Japan, where they were surprised to know how many members they have. Handa says that the fact that most of the Inazuma Japan representatives are from Raimon have gained them popularity, and the number of the soccer club members increases every day. They also show the new clubroom rebuilt by the chairman, which most of the materials came from the old clubroom. The Raimon team cheers for them, and Endou and the Inazuma Japan players thanked them. Later, Kidou, Someoka, Hiroto, and Kazemaru are seen practicing, and Fubuki came. Working hard for Raimon, Fubuki thought that the Hakuren team may feel the same way. Then they talked about Endou and how he grew stronger. Then the rest of the Inazuma Japan players, except for Endou and Gouenji, came.In the attic of the lounging house, Endou stared at the Raimon Soccer Club's doorplate, and Gouenji finds him there. They were happy that the soccer club earned so many members. Then Endou reminisced of the past, when he started playing soccer:Back then, when Endou was still a kid, he was cleaning the house for the New Year's Eve. In a large cabinet, he found a notebook, and when he read it, he felt a shock as if he was struck by a lightning. Because of that, he started playing soccer. His mom was against it, but his stubborn nature made his dad convince her to let Endou play.Entering Junior High school, he decided to join a soccer club. However, he found out that there was no soccer club. So he found a soccer club, together with his classmate, and found an old clubroom. Then the two of them cleaned the room, and waited for members. For the whole year, they were only four of them, with Someoka and Handa. The next year, there were four more members, who were Kabeyama, Kurimatsu, Shishido, and Shourinji, who were all freshmen.The next day, Fuyuka brought a notebook, which was the notebook of Daisuke given to her father. Also, Endou let Fuyuka keep it. The four managers tried to read the notebook, but they remembered that the notebook is illegible for them. Hearing this, Otonashi remembered that she took down the meaning of the notebook while Endou read them aloud, and the four recalled them all. Later, they practiced for the last time in preparation for the match with Little Gigant. Fubuki said that he takes the Heart #7 from Daisuke's notebook, which is the forgiving strength. Also, the Little Gigant are getting ready for the finals. Daisuke is also looking forward for the match as he wishes good luck for both his grandson and Rococo.
122	"Inazuma Japan's Final Battle!"; Transliteration: "Inazuma Japan Saigo no Tatakai!" (Japanese: イナズマジャパン最後の戦い!)	March 9, 2011	
Everyone in Inazuma Japan started to train more and more for their upcoming match since that match is the final one. The managers cooked some food for the others, and Hibiki talked to Kudou and stated that he entrusted the team to him. Afterwards, Natsumi and Endou talked. Afterwards, Endou stated that he looked forward to the match, much to Natsumi's surprise. Then, the first half later started. With this, Inazuma Japan tried to shoot by using Bakunetsu Screw but failed to score a goal. Afterwards, they tried to use Route of Sky but it was broken through also. Then, shockingly, Little Gigant used their tactic and afterwards scored a goal.Natsumi then stated that God Catch was still incomplete.
123	"Showdown!! Little Gigant (Part 1)"; Transliteration: "Chōjō Kessen!! Ritoru Giganto Zenpen" (Japanese: 頂上決戦!!リトルギガント・前編)	March 23, 2011	
The match starts as in the first half as Inazuma Japan uses a hissatsu to take a point but Rococo used God Hand X and blocked it easily. The afterwards Rococo kicks the ball from afar but Endou stops the shot and realizes it is a challenge from Rococo. Then Drago uses Double Jaw and scores the first point. Everyone is surprised and finally Little Gigant attacks using one hissatsu after another, but Endou can't seem to block it. The others help him block it by forming a circle in front the goalpost, but many get injured because of this. Then Coach Kudou reminds him that he is the captain. Afterwards he understood what Coach Kudou meant and became able to block the move of Little Gigant with his new hissatsu called God Catch. Now it is Inazuma Japan's attack. Hiroto brings out his brand new hissatsu, Tenkuu Otoshi and wins a point. The first half ends with Inazuma Japan and Little Gigant tied.
124	"Showdown!! Little Gigant (Part 2)"; Transliteration: "Chōjō Kessen!! Ritoru Giganto Kōhen" (Japanese: 頂上決戦!!リトルギガント・後編)	April 6, 2011	
Kidou steals the ball from Little Gigant and passes it on to Gouenji, Toramaru and Hiroto. They use the Grand Fire G2 to make a goal but at the same time the new goalkeeper of Little Gigant uses God Hand X 改 and stops it quite easily. Both Inazuma Japan and Little Gigant continuously attack. As the match goes on both the teams are evolving and new hissatsu are being seen continuously. Rococo again has the ball and he uses X Blast once more but this time Endou was able to stop it with his evolved God Catch. Finally Inazuma Japan is able to tie the score with Big Bang crushing 真 God Hand X. Rococo is again moved to the goalkeeper's position. He was also able to stop Big Bang with his new hissatsu Tamashii The Hand. Then the match continues and at the end of the episode, Rococo has attempted yet another goal by his X Blast V2, but he failed. The score is tied at 2-2.
125	"Final Truth! Number One in the World!!"; Transliteration: "Tsui ni Ketchaku! Sekaiichi!!" (Japanese: ついに決着!世界一!!)	April 13, 2011	
Rococo goes back as goalkeeper and both teams are on the rage on winning the FFI! Endou catches Rococo's X Blast V3 with his evolved God Catch G3. The match starts and both teams are doing their best – Rococo stops any shot, even though Endou stops any shoot, but Little Gigant is more flexible. Finally the ball gets to Inazuma Japan. Coach Kudou tells Inazuma Japan his last word. He told them to enjoy themselves and Inazuma Japan understood what coach Kudou said so they started trying to enjoy the match. Endou encourages them. Finally, they won against Little Gigant.
126	"A Tearful Graduation Ceremony!"; Transliteration: "Namida no Sotsugyō-shiki!" (Japanese: 涙の卒業式!)	April 20, 2011	
All of Inazuma Japan came home to Japan and went back to their respective places with a warm welcome. And now, the graduation ceremony starts. Endou Mamoru heads to the school along with Toramaru and Aki. All three remember the past, and Endou tells Toramaru how Raimon started out. After reaching Raimon, Gouenji joins them and also tells another story about when he first wore Raimon's uniform. Kidou also comes in and states that he used to be an enemy but now, they're all friends. Then the three: Kidou, Gouenji and Endou go to their graduation ceremony to which Toramaru commented that the three were close friends.The graduation ceremony begins and the principal started giving out the diplomas. When it came to Endou's turn, Endou saw that most of his friends were crying.After the graduation ceremony, Endou goes to the soccer club and is nostalgic yet again. Endou states that the new captain for Raimon is Kurimatsu, which made Kurimatsu nervous. Toramaru comments that he will be the new striker for Raimon.Fubuki, Tsunami, Kogure, Touko, Rika and some others come to Raimon so they could have a match with each other. Then a bus comes by and it is revealed that it is Teikoku Gakuen and they'll watch the match.
127	"Kick-off to Tomorrow!"; Transliteration: "Ashita e no Kikkuofu!" (Japanese: 明日へのキックオフ!)	April 27, 2011	
The match is about to start when Teikoku Gakuen arrive at Raimon, startling them. But they came out of the vehicle and said that they came to watch the graduation match, as it was a special occasion. It was Raimon vs Raimon B and Natsumi announced the match to start. Kakuma Keita then arrived to commentate for the match. The match started with persistent tackling and dribbling, and more having fun than trying to win. Then all of the players have flashbacks of moments in their lives at Raimon. After a long while, everyone stops playing, and start talking about high school, and to make a new legend even if they are going to separate schools. The match resumes only for a few minutes, and ends at 0-0. Natsumi asks Endou as the former captain to make a closing comment, with Endou surprised, everyone else agrees. He makes his comment as: "Everyone, let's keep playing soccer!". Endou then says they should play another match, but this time, with Teikoku. Endou is heard talking/thinking to himself, saying that no matter how old he gets he'll never stop playing soccer, and he can't wait to see what the future holds for him.
