= Inazuma Eleven season 2 =

Inazuma Eleven
- Season 2
- Cover of the second DVD compilation of Inazuma Eleven released by Geneon Entertainment.
- No. of episodes: 41

Release
- Original network: TV Tokyo
- Original release: April 8, 2009 – January 27, 2010

Season chronology
- ← Previous; Season 1 Next → Season 3

The second season of Inazuma Eleven aired from April 8, 2009, to January 27, 2010, on TV Tokyo. The season is based on Level-5's Inazuma Eleven 2 video game. The season was produced by OLM under the direction of Katsuhito Akiyama and consists of 41 episodes. In the season, Endou and Raimon had to gather players from all over Japan to defeat the new enemies, Aliea Gakuen.

For episodes 27 to 54, the opening theme is "Maji de Kansha!". "Tsunagari-yo" is the opening theme for episodes 55 to 67. "Seishun Bus Guide" was the closing theme for episodes 27 to 50 while episodes 51 to 67 use the closing theme "Ryūsei Boy".

== Episode list ==
No.	English title (Translated title)	Original release date	English air date
27	"The Aliens Are Here!/ The Aliens Came!"; Transliteration: "Uchū-jin ga Kita!" (Japanese: 宇宙人が来た!)	April 8, 2009	August 30, 2011/May 1, 2017 (Nicktoons Africa)
Raimon's victory proves to be short-lived, as only a few minutes after their win, the sky falls in. All of a sudden the earth is overrun by aliens! What will Endou and the others do about this out of this world development?
28	"The Raimon 11 Fight Back! /Sortie! The Kaminarimon Eleven!!"; Transliteration: "Shutsugeki! Raimon Irebun!!" (Japanese: 出撃!雷門イレブン!!)	April 15, 2009	August 31, 2011/May 2, 2017 (Nicktoons Africa)
The Raimon Eleven have stepped up to battle the soccer players of Aliea Gakuen, who call themselves Gemini Storm, but it's like pitting an ant against an elephant. Meanwhile, the Prime Minister is in danger from the very same threat, as, indeed, is the world itself.
29	"Take Down the Black 11!/Defeat! The 11 in Black!!"; Transliteration: "Taose! Kuro no 11-nin!!" (Japanese: 倒せ!黒の11人!!)	April 22, 2009	September 1, 2011/May 3, 2017 (Nicktoons Africa)
The Prime Minister has been kidnapped by aliens, with Endou and the others determined to save him. The Inazuma Caravan travels to the park where he was kidnapped, ready to beat the aliens. But wait — who are these people? And why do they think the Raimon Eleven are aliens?
30	"The Threat of Alias Academy! /Threat! Eiria Academy!!"; Transliteration: "Kyōi! Eiria Gakuen!!" (Japanese: 脅威!エイリア学園!!)	April 29, 2009	September 2, 2011/May 4, 2017 (Nicktoons Africa)
The Raimon Eleven never gives up, and they're going to try again against Gemini Storm. They go head to head, but the Aliea players are just too powerful. In the end, Endou gets seriously injured because of the coach's orders, and ace striker Gouenji is asked to leave. Unbeknownst to the team, Gouenji was being blackmailed by Aliea agents regarding his sister, so accepts the order with no pushback.
31	"The Search For The Legendary Striker /Looking for the Legendary Striker!"; Transliteration: "Densetsu no Sutoraikā o Sagase!" (Japanese: 伝説のストライカーを探せ!)	May 6, 2009	September 5, 2011/May 5, 2017 (Nicktoons Africa)
The news that Gouenji has been kicked off the team doesn't sit well with most of the Raimon Eleven, especially Someoka. He carries the grudge all the way to Hokkaido, as the team search for a mysterious ace striker - Fubuki Shirou. While traveling through a blizzard, they come across a stranger freezing in the cold. Who is he, and where did this stranger come from?
32	"The Prince of Snowland! /The Prince Of Snowland!"; Transliteration: "Setsugen no Ōji!" (Japanese: 雪原の皇子!)	May 13, 2009	September 6, 2011/May 8, 2017 (Nicktoons Africa)
The Raimon team are both excited and surprised when they finally meet Shirou Fubuki, discovering that he's the stranger they had picked up earlier. But is he really as good as everyone says? There's only one way to find out, and that's to play a match against him. Will he live up to the hype?
33	"Who is the New Ace Striker? /Who is the Striker?"; Transliteration: "Ēsu Sutoraikā wa Dare da!" (Japanese: エースストライカーはだれだ!)	May 20, 2009	September 7, 2011/May 9, 2017 (Nicktoons Africa)
Fubuki proves himself to be as skilled a player as they had heard, if not more-so. However, before they can properly recruit him, Gemini Storm arrives. Will their new striker be enough to finally achieve victory?
34	"An Attack from Aluis Academy!"/"Shock! Eiria Academy!!"; Transliteration: "Shōgeki! Eiria Gakuen!!" (Japanese: 衝撃!エイリア学園!!)	May 27, 2009	September 8, 2011/May 10, 2017 (Nicktoons Africa)
With Fubuki's help, Raimon defeats Gemini Storm. However, another Aliea team, calling themselves Epsilon, arrives, and seemingly erases Gemini Storm from existence. Their leader, Desarm, says he will face Raimon at a later date. Has the teams's job just got harder?
35	"Epsilon's Attacks!/Epsilon's Attack!"; Transliteration: "Ipushiron Raishū!" (Japanese: イプシロン来襲!)	June 3, 2009	September 9, 2011/May 11, 2017 (Nicktoons Africa)
Just when everyone thought the earth had been saved, Epsilon picks up where Gemini Storm left off. These guys mean serious business, and their next target it Manyuuji Junior High in Kyōto. Will Raimon be able to help them, or is it too late? Meanwhile, Haruna thinks she's found a new member for the team? Who is he? And will he be of any help?
36	"The Hidden Power! /Hidden Power!"; Transliteration: "Kakusareta Chikara!" (Japanese: かくされた力!)	June 10, 2009	September 12, 2011/May 12, 2017 (Nicktoons Africa)
After the crushing defeat of Manyuuji Junior High, Raimon step up to take on Epsilon, with Kogure Yuuya joining them on Otonashi Haruna's urging. The results are strange and disheartening, but also encouraging in a way. They're going to have to do a lot of hard work though!
37	"Royal Academy Strikes Back:(Part 1)/Teikoku Strikes Back!! (Part 1)"; Transliteration: "Teikoku no Gyakushū Zenpen!!" (Japanese: 帝国の逆襲・前編!!)	June 17, 2009	September 13, 2011/May 15, 2017 (Nicktoons Africa)
After learning that Kageyama Reiji has escaped, Kidou makes it his mission to track down his former mentor before he can hurt anyone else. They meet a young man called Fudou Akio, a member of Shin Teikoku, who leads them to Kageyama. Once there, Kidou discovers that Sakuma and Genda have rejoined Kageyama. Why? How is this possible?
38	"Royal Academy Strikes Back:(Part 2)/Teikoku Strikes Back!! (Part 2)"; Transliteration: "Teikoku no Gyakushū Kōhen!!" (Japanese: 帝国の逆襲・後編!!)	June 24, 2009	September 14, 2011/May 16, 2017 (Nicktoons Africa)
Kidou realizes that Sakuma and Genda have been taught forbidden techniques by Kageyama, which will kill or incapacitate them if used too often. Can he get through to them before it's too late?
39	"The Last Wyvern Blizzard!/The Last Wyvern Blizzard!"; Transliteration: "Saigo no Waibān Burizādo!" (Japanese: 最後のワイバーンブリザード!)	July 1, 2009	September 15, 2011/May 17, 2017 (Nicktoons Africa)
Raimon finally comes home to recharge their batteries, and to do some more training. They find out that everyone's been training to help them, including some old opponents! But all is not well on the team; the tough training has proved to be too much for one member in particular.
40	"Eric Eagle In Serious Trouble! /Eric Eagle In Serious Trouble!"; Transliteration: "Ichinose! Saidai no Kiki!!" (Japanese: 一之瀬!最大の危機!!)	July 8, 2009	September 16, 2011
Raimon arrived in Naniwa Land, where rumors say that Aliea Gakuen has some sort of base. However, Ichinose gets side-tracked by a girl named Urabe Rika, who tricks him into eating her 'lovey-dovey dish', claiming he now has to marry her. The team challenges Rika's team, the Osaka Gals, to a match' the winner will get Ichinose. Will Raimon win against these powerful soccer girls? What will happen to Ichinose?
41	"Demolins Trap!"; Transliteration: "Dezāmu no Wana!" (Japanese: デザームの罠!)	July 22, 2009	September 19, 2011
The team trains with the Osaka Gals in the secret Aliea base, which the Gals have discovered and co-opted. However, Epsilon materialize inside the base, challenging Raimon to a fight. Will Raimon be victorious this time?
42	"Epsilon! The Toughest Battle Yet!"; Transliteration: "Gekitō! Saikyō Ipushiron!!" (Japanese: 激闘!最凶イプシロン!!)	July 29, 2009	September 20, 2011
The big game against Epsilon is here, and Raimon fights back with all their might! Will they be able to win against the aliens? Meanwhile, Fubuki is having an identity crisis that threatens to tear him and the team apart!
43	"Grandpa's Secret Trick!"; Transliteration: "Jī-chan no Kyūkyoku Ōgi!" (Japanese: じいちゃんの究極奥義!)	August 5, 2009	September 21, 2011
The team heads to Fukuoka to find another notebook of Endou's grandfather. There, they meet Tachimukai Yuki, a huge fan of Endou's who has mastered his own version of God Hand. But is he just as good as his idol? Only one way to find out!
44	"The Other Majin The Hand!"; Transliteration: "Mō Hitotsu no Majin za Hando!" (Japanese: もうひとつのマジン・ザ・ハンド!)	August 12, 2009	September 22, 2011
The exhibition game between Raimon and Yokato is a knuckle biting affair, with both Endou and Tachimukai ahowing off their Goalkeeper moves. After seeing Majin The Hand, Tachimukai tries to learn it too. Meanwhile they're being watched - just who is this Hiroto boy...?
45	"Size Make Earthquake!"; Transliteration: "Gekishin! Saikyō no Jeneshisu!!" (Japanese: 激震!最強のジェネシス!!)	August 19, 2009	September 23, 2011
Hiroto reveals himself to be Gran, captain of Aliea Gakuen's The Genesis, and challenges Raimon to a game. It quickly turns into a one-sided match, as The Genesis keeps on scoring and none of the Raimon Eleven can keep up with their movements. Fubuki gets injured while trying to stop Gran's shoot, Ryuusei Blade, and his past is revealed after the match by Coach Hitomiko. But what's even more shocking is Kazemaru's decision to quit the team!
46	"The Captain's Trial!"; Transliteration: "Kyaputen no Shiren!" (Japanese: キャプテンの試練!)	August 26, 2009	September 26, 2011
The departures of Kazemaru and Kurimitsu send Endou into a deep depression. Can his teammates snap him out of it and convince him to continue the mission?
47	"The Great Battle In The Southern Sea!"; Transliteration: "Nankai no Daikettō!" (Japanese: 南海の大決闘!)	September 2, 2009	September 27, 2011
The news about the existence of a flame striker sends Raimon to Okinawa, hoping that it might be Gouenji Shuuya. But what unexpected things might happen along the way? And who is this crazy surfer dude?
48	"The Flame Striker!"; Transliteration: "Honoo no Sutoraikā!" (Japanese: 炎のストライカー!)	September 9, 2009	September 28, 2011
Right after arriving at Okinawa, Raimon starts the search for the flame striker. While searching, Fubuki and Domon run into a player claiming he's the flame striker. After they take him to the team, he introduces himself as Nagumo Haruya and shows them his hissatsu shot. It seems Nagumo will be a great assist to Raimon, but can he be trusted?
49	"The Radical Rhythmic Soccer Game!"; Transliteration: "Norinori! Rizumu Sakkā!!" (Japanese: ノリノリ!リズムサッカー!!)	September 16, 2009	September 29, 2011
Tsunami reveals to Raimon that he has joined his school's soccer club, and they want to have a game with them. Raimon goes to Oumihara Junior High, and the game begins. They soon realize that, while the Oumihara players seem quite weird, they're actually very good. And how in the world do they keep stealing the ball, as well as evading attacks from Raimon every time?
50	"The Fist of Justice!"; Transliteration: "Unare! Seigi no Tekken!!" (Japanese: うなれ!正義の鉄拳!!)	September 23, 2009	September 30, 2011
The game between Raimon and Oumihara continues, with neither teams pulling back. In the end Raimon wins, but it's a narrow victory. But Raimon's joy doesn't last long, as Epsilon crashes the party.
51	"Epsilon's Counterattack!"; Transliteration: "Gyakushū! Ipushiron Kai!!" (Japanese: 逆襲!イプシロン改!!)	September 30, 2009	October 4, 2011
Epsilon, now calling themselves Epsilon Kai, challenge Raimon to a rematch. Will the addition of Tsunami work in Raimon's favor? Meanwhile, Fubuki begins having another identity crisis. Will it cost this match, as it did the last one?
52	"The Explosive Flames of Revival!"; Transliteration: "Fukkatsu no Bakuen!" (Japanese: 復活の爆炎!)	September 30, 2009	October 5, 2011
The matcb between Raimon and Episolon Kai continues, with Episilon dominating the field. But just when all seems lost, an unexpected figure shows up. Can it really be him?
53	"The Freezing Darkness Of Diamond Dust!"; Transliteration: "Itetsuku Yami Daiyamondo Dasuto!" (Japanese: 凍てつく闇・ダイヤモンドダスト!)	October 6, 2009	October 6, 2011
Gouenji's return, along with the victory against Epsilon Kai, have lifted Raimon's spirits. They decide to go back home to rest. But as soon as they get back, Aliea Gakuen's Diamond Dust demand that Raimon face them in a game, or Tokyo will be destroyed with black soccer balls. However, it's a tough match right in the beginning. Endou is having difficulty in blocking even normal shoots. Just then, an old opponent appears before them...
54	"The Strongest Assist, Aphrodi!"; Transliteration: "Saikyō no Sukketo Afurodi!" (Japanese: 最強の助っ人アフロディ!)	October 14, 2009	October 7, 2011
Someone unexpected is here to join Raimon in the middle of the match - Aphrodi! Raimon's former rival has come to join and fight alongside them! But most of the old Raimon members don't trust this player. And when Tsunami gets hold of the ball, things start looking a little better...
55	"A New Challenge!"; Transliteration: "Endō Aratanaru Chōsen!" (Japanese: 円堂・新たなる挑戦!)	October 21, 2009	October 8, 2011
Coach Hitomiko decides to remove Endou as goalkeeper, asking him to train as a libero. Following this, Aphrodi becomes a forward, and Tachimukai takes Endou's place as goalkeeper. Can the team adjust to these new positions? And will this lead to the creation of new hissatsu?
56	"Showdown! Endō VS Gōenji!!"; Transliteration: "Taiketsu! Endō VS Gōenji!!" (Japanese: 対決!円堂VS豪炎寺!!)	October 28, 2009	October 10, 2011
The Raimon Eleven comes to Teikoku Gakuen for training, as requested by Kidou. Kidou also requests his former teammates, the Teikoku team, to play a friendly against Raimon, with Endou, Kidou and Domon on Teikoku's side. Will this cooperation allow them to master Teikoku's signature move, Death Zone?
57	"The Miraculous Team! The Chaos!!"; Transliteration: "Kiseki no Chīmu! Za Kaosu!!" (Japanese: 奇跡のチーム!ザ・カオス!!)	November 4, 2009	October 11, 2011
At the beginning of the episode, it shows that all of the Raimon are in Teikoku grounds when a soccer ball appeared. It created a fog and when it cleared up, Gazel and Burn was shown and declaring themselves as "Chaos" to tell the Raimon to have a fight with them to prove who is best in the universe and with that Natsumi, Kino and Otonashi went to tell Coach Hitomiko about the challenge in two days at Teikoku stadium.Kidou is giving out orders about the training before the match with The Chaos begun (in which in their time is tomorrow). Endou, Domon and Kidou are going to strengthen Death Zone 2, Tachimukai, Tsunami will continue to work on Mugen The Hand and for the others will work on their formation centering around Gouenji and Aphrodi.And their training begun.The first scene of their training starts off with Tachimuukai and Tsunami. Tsunami used Tsunami Boost. Tachimuukai stood on his ground as he thinks of what Tsunami told him earlier. He claps his hand and a blue hand (similar to God Hand) appeared in front of him but was shattered in pieces and Tachimuukai was sent to the goal along with the ball. He threw the ball back to Tsunami and their training continues with and sound of Tsunami saying "Tsunami Boost". The tree girls are watching them train while Fubuki stood afar.Endou, Domon and Kidou practiced Death Zone 2 while the others are practicing with Gouenji and Aphrodi. Fubuki looks at them training and walks away.Endou noticed him leave as Aphrodi says in his mind that he'll watch Raimon in his place until he comes back. He is then seen in the riverbank where kids are playing soccer. He reminisced on what happened a while ago with Endou starting with Death Zone 2, Tachimuukai with Mugen the Hand and Gouenji passing the ball to Aphrodi. He then clenched his fist and if he starts to kick the ball, Atsuya might take over him again. A ball was accidentally thrown to him by two kids and asked him if he can give the ball back. When he grabbed the ball he then remembered him and Atsuya when they were kids. He stood still and the two boys snapped him out and he threw the ball back to the kids. The boys left and Fubuki saw Atsuya and tries to call him but it was only an imagination. And with that, the practice at Raimon ended.Endou was about to go home when Gazel and Burn's image flashed. Tsunami called him and both of them went to the Steel Tower Plaza. Tsunami saw the tire where Endou usually trains. Endou showed Tsunami how he trains with it and Tsunami tries. When he threw the tire, he jumps on it as the tire swings. He then jumpes off and Endou commented on him that he has an amazing balance. Kidou and Gouenji turned up. Gounji and Tsunami were "playing" with the tire while Endou and Kidou were talking about Gran. Tsunami then calls Kidou and Endou.And the day arrived to where they will have a match with The Chaos in Teikoku Stadium. They were all waiting for Chaos to arrive. The rest of the Teikoku were the audience. Fubuki was far to where the others are and Aphrodi looks to where he sat while Tachimukai was still worried about Mugen The Hand. Tsunami comforts himby saying have more confidence in himself. And The Chaos appeared.The match begun with Kakuma comentaring and with Raimon's kickoff. Gouenji and Aphrodi dashed upward. Aphrodi passed the ball to Gouenji and Gouenji passed the ball to Ichinose to Touko while Fubuki watches them. Droll steals the ball and charges forward and was able to get past Domon and Kabeyama and keeps on going. Tsunami dashes forward to him but he passed the ball to Gazel. He did Northern Impact and Tachimukai did Majin The Hand, since Mugen The Hand is still not complete, failed and thus The Chaos scored. The match continued with the ball to Endou. He passed the ball to Gouenji and moves up and was surrounded by Gokka and Clear and Gouenji passed the ball to Aphrodi. Nepper charged towards him. Aphrodi stopped and did Heaven's Time. Nepper and Heat were frozen as Aphrodi walks with the ball away from them. And at some time, Nepper was unfrozen and stole the ball from Aphrodi. Nepper passed the ball to Heat but Kidou makes a steal. Gouenji was blocked and Kidou kicked the ball to Aphrodi who was open. Aphrodi did Heaven's Time and it failed again. Nepper got past Endou and the ball went to Burn and he did Atomic Flare. Tachimukai used Majin The Hand once more but failed again. Gazel used Northern Impact and scored; Burn did Atomic Flare again scored. They shot nonstop at Tachimukai and Chaos scored 10-0. Chaos momentum won't stop and Burn used his hissatsu once more and Endou did Megaton Head and he fell back without Chaos score. Everytime The Chaos attacks, Raimon's defense won't let them score to the goal. Ichinose rushes up ahead but Bomber uses Ignite Steal. Raimon attacks continuously. Kidou then tries to think of a strategy. Nepper got passed Kidou's slide and Ichinose's Flame Dance. The episode ended with 10-0 Chaos in the lead.
58	"Explode! Fire Blizzard!"; Transliteration: "Sakuretsu! Faia Burizādo!!" (Japanese: 炸裂!ファイアブリザード!!)	November 11, 2009	October 12, 2011
Thanks to Otomura, Kidou figures out how to stop Chaos' rhythm. The flow of the game is totally reversed as Raimon keeps scoring without stopping. Gazel and Burn realize their team members are fighting amongst themselves and decide to use Fire Blizzard to show them that together they're unbeatable. Also, Chaos creates an ultimate defense by combining Frozen Steal and Ignite Steal. Aphrodi tries to get past their wall but cannot and instead gets injured and has to leave the team. Despite Aphrodi's injuries, Coach Hitomiko doesn't substitute in Rika, leading to Rika's anger with the coach. The game comes to a halt because Gran intervenes. But what does he mean when he refers to Coach Hitomiko as "sister"?.
59	"At Last We're Here! Aliea Academy!!"; Transliteration: "Tsui ni Kita! Eiria Gakuen!!" (Japanese: ついに来た!エイリア学園!!)	November 18, 2009	October 13, 2011
Raimon learns that Hitomiko and Gran are both related. They were shocked to hear that they were both siblings. Then, Raimon started to demand answers. Hitomiko then states that if they want the answer, they must continue to ride on the Inazuma Caravan and go to Mt. Fuji.The whole team is still deciding whether to come. Though in the end, after some thinking, they all decided to go.During the night, Fubuki trains alone. He trains by shooting balls in the goal, but fails to hit it. Gouenji then came and they trained together. When it started to rain, Fubuki suddenly panicked. The sound of the thunder reminded him of the sound of the avalanche which killed his family. Fubuki tells Gouenji that he hates to be alone. Gouenji then leaves him since he is the only one who can answer his own problems.While traveling, Endou discussed about the hissatsu, The Earth which was in his grandfather's notebook. Afterwards, when they reached Mt. Fuji, they were shocked seeing a giant UFO-like floating object.
60	"Aliea Academy's True Identity!"; Transliteration: "Eiria Gakuen no Shōtai!" (Japanese: エイリア学園の正体!)	December 2, 2009	October 14, 2011
As Raimon enters Aliea Gakuen, its shocking truth is revealed: the Aliea players were human children whose abilities had been enhanced by the Aliea meteorite. Following this revelation, the battle to decide the world's fate between Raimon and The Genesis begins!
61	"The Final Battle!(Part 1)"; Transliteration: "Saishū Kessen! Za Jeneshisu Zenpen!!" (Japanese: 最終決戦!ザ・ジェネシス・前編!!)	December 9, 2009	October 17, 2011
The match between Raimon and The Genesis continues. Raimon is down by one goal and is in big trouble. Tachimukai isn't able to stop the ball using Mugen The Hand. Then, Fubuki decides to come back to the field to find his answer. Though, Atsuya keeps gaining control on him. Gouenji kicks the ball at Fubuki then asks him: "Can't you hear their voices?" Finally Fubuki knows what his father meant with "perfect". Fubuki then gains control over Atsuya's soul and is able to play his soccer. He then uses a new hissatsu, Wolf Legend and equals the scores. However, Kira Seijirou reveals another secret: Although the energy from the Aliea meteorite is what strengthens humans, The Genesis is made up of normal humans who became stronger through training! The Genesis now shows their true power and scores another goal using Supernova and breaks through the evolved Mugen The Hand. The score is now 2-1 with The Genesis taking the lead.
62	"The Final Battle!(Part 2)"; Transliteration: "Saishū Kessen! Za Jeneshisu Kōhen!!" (Japanese: 最終決戦!ザ・ジェネシス・後編!!)	December 16, 2009	October 18, 2011
The match starts again in the 2nd half and The Genesis is still in the lead. Kira Seijirou tells the truth and that he states that the other Raimon members where weak, and that is why they were removed. This made Endou angry and started to charge on his own but fails to do so. Later, Coach Hitomiko said that she want to change her father's mind. She stated that she cannot do it alone, but she can do it with everyone. Everyone in Raimon unify their feeling and able to use the new hissatsu, The Earth and won the game in the end because of this hissatsu. Though, after Seijirou realizing his wrongdoings, Ulvida lost her temper towards "their father" and shot a ball at him. This episode ends with the shocked faces of everyone.
63	"The Neverending Threat!"; Transliteration: "Owari Naki Kyōi!" (Japanese: 終わりなき脅威!)	December 23, 2009	October 19, 2011
Raimon has finally defeated The Genesis, and opened Seijirou's eyes. But one question remains; why did Seijirou start Aliea Gakuen in the first place?!
64	"The Raimon vs. Raimon Face Off!"; Transliteration: "Gekitotsu! Raimon VS Raimon!!" (Japanese: 激突!雷門VS雷門!!)	January 6, 2010	October 20, 2011
On returning to school, the Raimon Eleven are confronted by a group of cloaked figures. They throw back their hoods, revealing themselves to be Kazemaru, Someoka, and their other former teammates. What's going on? Why are they calling themselves the Dark Emperors? And why do they seem to hate Endou so much?
65	"The Ultimate Friendship Move!"; Transliteration: "Yūjō no Kyūkyoku Ōgi!" (Japanese: 友情の究極奥義!)	January 13, 2010	October 21, 2011
Both teams prove to be evenly-matched, with the score standing at 2-2. However, things take a turn when the Dark Emperors start attacking violently. The Raimon Eleven try to block the Dark Emperors' shots with their own bodies, but fall one after another. Endou switches back to goalkeeper to replace an injured Tachimukai. What can he do to remind their old friends of their true soccer?
66	"The Worlds Strongest Team! Blizzard Version!"; Transliteration: "Chijō Saikyō no Chīmu e! Burizādo-hen!!" (Japanese: 地上最強のチームへ!ブリザード編!!)	January 20, 2010	October 22, 2011
Raimon's long fight against Aliea Gakuen is finally over, and everyone is prepared to go home. Fubuki finds Endou in his training place, and the two of them recall their journey from the day Gemini Storm appeared to before going to Okinawa. Then Gouenji joins them.
67	"The Worlds Strongest Team! Fire Version!"; Transliteration: "Chijō Saikyō no Chīmu e! Faia-hen!!" (Japanese: 地上最強のチームへ!ファイア編!!)	January 27, 2010	October 25, 2011
Gouenji tells Endou and Fubuki about the time when he left Raimon, then they recall their numerous battles against Aliea Gakuen, training, meeting new friends and enemies. The three of them then promise to have a match between Raimon and Hakuren next time.
