= Inazuma Eleven season 1 =

Inazuma Eleven
- Season 1
- Cover of the first DVD compilation of Inazuma Eleven released by Geneon Entertainment.
- No. of episodes: 26

Release
- Original network: TV Tokyo
- Original release: October 5, 2008 – March 29, 2009

Season chronology
- Next → Season 2

The first season of Inazuma Eleven aired on TV Tokyo from October 5, 2008, to March 29, 2009. The season is based on Level-5's video game of the same name. The season was produced by OLM under the direction of Katsuhito Akiyama and consists of 26 episodes.

Mark Evans is a cheerful goalkeeper in Raimon Jr High, along with six other players in the team. But there was a day when the team was almost lead to disbandment by Nelly Raimon, a daughter of the owner of the school, Sonny Raimon.Unless they are to win the match against the Royals Academy, currently the best team of Japan. He tries to save the club by gathering four more players to the team.

The opening theme is "Tachiagari-yo". The closing theme is "Seishun Oden" performed by Twel'v.

== Episode list ==
No.	English title (Translated title)	Original release date	English air date
1	"Let's Play Soccer!"; Transliteration: "Sakkā Yarou ze!" (Japanese: サッカーやろうぜ!)	October 5, 2008	July 25, 2011; January 2, 2017 (South Africa)
The episode begins with a destructive sure-kill shoot to the goal and Yuto Kidou disbanding an unknown school's soccer club before destroying the school. In Inazuma City, Tokyo, at Raimon Jr. High, Mamoru Endou, the soccer club's goalkeeper and captain, is trying to convince the other six members of the club (Ryugo Someoka, Heigorou Kabeyama, Teppei Kurimatsu, Shin'ichi Handa, Ayumu "Shourin" Shourinji and Sakichi Shishido) to practice. Despite him reminding them of their dream of joining the Football Frontier, a national tournament for Japanese school teams, no one feels motivated to train and they all give excuses. Aki Kino, the team's manager, offers to try and convince them, but Endou goes to the riverbank alone to practice instead. In the afternoon, when Endou practices at the riverbank with some children, one of the children is showing off his sure-kill shoot, which almost hits one of two punks who are passing by. Endou apologizes and asks the punks to return the ball, but the request is cut when one of the punks kicks Endou's stomach and the other insults him for being in a weak team. Not soon later, he spits and kicks the ball, which heads straight for a small girl. Suddenly, a mysterious boy runs in and kicks the soccer ball back rolling at the punk's face. Evans asks the boy to join the Raimon soccer team but the boy ignores him and leaves. The next day, the mysterious boy enrolls in Raimon Jr. High as a transfer student from Kidokawa Seishuu Junior high, and is introduced as Shuya Gouenji. Endou is called to the principal's office, where he is told by the principal and by the school founder's daughter, Natsumi Raimon, that Teikoku Academy, the undefeated winner of the Football Frontier for the last forty years, wants to have a friendly match with Raimon; if Raimon loses, their soccer club will be disbanded. Endou, left with no other choice but to find four more players to fill out his team, goes around the school to try and recruit new members. He invites those who were interested in entering the club to the place where he practices. A member of the Raimon athletics club, Ichirouta Kazemaru, considers the offer and joins Endou in his training, during which he comments about owning a notebook from his late grandfather Daisuke Endou, written in a script only Endou can understand, and containing many techniques from Daisuke's own career as a soccer player. Moved by Endou's dedication to the sport, Kazemaru joins the soccer team. In the meantime, three other students also join: Kusuke "Max" Matsuno, Jin Kageno, and Kakeru Megane (even though Megane has no athletic talents whatsoever and demands to be the ace striker). Endou asks Gouenji, but he refuses on the grounds that he has stopped playing soccer, and doesn't reveal why. The day of the match between Teikoku and Raimon finally arrives. All of Teikoku's members are skillful and terrifying. Will Raimon be able to win the match, or will their club be disbanded?
2	"Teikoku is Here!"; Transliteration: "Teikoku ga Kita!" (Japanese: 帝国が来た!)	October 12, 2008	July 26, 2011 January 3, 2017 (South Africa)
While watching Royals warm up, Jack gets scared and excuses himself to go to the washroom. Since he doesn't come back, Evans and the others quickly look for him, only to find that he managed to get himself trapped in a locker. Jude sharp, Royals Academy's captain, is asked by a teammate of why they're having a practice match with such a weak team, and he answers that something interesting will happen while looking at the direction where Blaze is at. After some encouragement from Evans, Jack and the rest of Raimon return to the field and the match starts. Raimon fares badly during the first half of the match and is completely at the mercy of Royals's normal shots, ending it with a score of 10-0. The reason for Royals requesting the match was that their leader, Jude Sharp, wanted to observe Blaze's current skill level; since Blaze is not participating, Sharp orders Kidou and the others to bring him out by any means necessary. In the second half of the match, Evans refuses to give up even though he is badly injured, so Kidou and his teammates brutally attack him with their sure-kill techniques, which include the Death Zone and the Hundred-Extreme Shot. Sharp threatens that if Blaze does not play in the match, then he will obliterate the last person standing (which is Evans). From the principal's office, Nelly notices that Royals have something up their sleeve and must be waiting for something to happen. Looking at the miserable state of his teammates, Willy flees cowardly crying away from the pitch and takes off his t-shirt, unintentionally dropping it in front of Blaze. Blaze picks up the t-shirt and joins the game, with the intent of stopping Kidou from attacking Evans further. Evans is delighted to see Blaze play and rushes to greet him, only to collapse and be caught by Blaze. Knowing that Blaze believes in him, Evans finally manages to stop the Death Zone using a sure-kill technique of his own; a police detective named Inspector Smith, who watches the match from afar, recognizes the move as one of David Evans's techniques, the God Hand.Evans throws the ball to Blaze, who then scores using his own technique, the Fire Tornado. Having seen all that they need of Blaze's power, Royals forfeits, which means that Raimon wins the match by default. Evans welcomes Blaze into the team, but Blaze still refuses to join and hands his shirt to Evans. Respecting Blaze's decision, Evans thanks him and diverts everyone's attention to their very first goal, telling them that this is Raimon's first step to their future.
3	"Call Out the Sure-Kill Technique!"; Transliteration: "Amidase Hissatsu-waza!" (Japanese: あみだせ必殺技!)	October 19, 2008	July 27, 2011 January 4, 2016 (South Africa)
The team is still on a high from their surprise win against Royals Academy, but there is a lot of work they still need to do. They discover that their next game will be against the Okaruto team, which is said to be cursed. Nelly strikes a bargain with Evans and says that if the team wins against Okaruto, she will get the school to enter them in the Football Frontier and if they lose, the soccer team will be disbanded. The other team members are excited, but believe that they will not be able to do well without Blaze, which angers Kevin. At the principal's office, the principal is looking at a paper with blood stains on it and asks Nelly if she told the team about the conditions of the challenge. She asks if there's a need to. The principal then reads the paper that came from Okaruto, saying that if they don't accept the challenge, they will be cursed. Suguru Fuyukai, Raimon's coach, asks if this is true and Nelly tells them both that Okaruto is a school surrounded in rumors and that makes them an interesting opponent. Raimon practices at the riverbank, where Kevin is doing some rough plays and even making fouls. Haruna Otonashi, a member of the school's newspaper club, then greets Aki and tells her that she became a fan of Raimon and went there to watch them practice. Otonashi finds out that their next opponent is Okaruto and instantly gets scared. She then tells everyone the frightening rumors surrounding Okaruto, which includes having their opponent catch a high fever three days after the match, having gusts of wind blow upon on them, and having their legs stop when making a goal. The first years talk about needing Blaze, which irritates Kevin Evans tells them that if they keep relying on others they won't get stronger and so they resume practice. Later that day, Evans still continues to practice at the Steel Plaza where Kazemaru joins him. They talk about how Blaze left an impression on the team, making Kazemaru think he doesn't want to lose to him, and Evans decides that he won't ask Blaze to be part of the team anymore since he wants the team to get stronger with the current members. The next day, Evans sees Blaze going to the hospital and decides to follow him, thinking that he is injured and that's the reason why he stopped playing soccer. When he bumps into him, Evans apologizes for following him and sees that the sign reads Julia Blaze. He asks who is in the room and Blaze tells him that she's his little sister. Inside the hospital room, Blaze tells Evans that Julia has been in a coma since last year, when she was involved in a car accident whilst going to see one of his games. Because of this, he promised that he would not play soccer until she wakes up, though he broke his promise in the game against Royals. Evans apologizes again, this time for insisting he should join Raimon. The next day, Otonashi is introduced to the team by Aki as their new manager. Jealous of Blaze for scoring the only point in their game against Royals, Kevin starts his special training. Evans watches him and, after hearing his friend say he would like to play more like Blaze, states that he has his own style, which gives Kevin more energy to continue training. During practice, Kevin creates a new sure-kill technique for himself, the Dragon Crash. At the same time, Kevin observes the training from the bridge when Nelly drives past and tells him that she did some research about his life and discovered what had happened to his sister. Nelly leaves, telling him to remember who liked to see him play soccer the most and to think if he is making her happy with his promise. Blaze then goes to the field and announces that he will join the team. This makes Evans happy.
4	"Here Comes the Dragon!"; Transliteration: "Doragon ga Deta!" (Japanese: ドラゴンが出た!)	October 26, 2008	July 28, 2011 January 5, 2017 (South Africa)
It is game day for Raimon as they are playing against a team that is supposedly cursed – Okaruto. Blaze is now officially part of the team, which Kevin is not happy about. When Okaruto arrives, their coach makes it clear that he is only interested in Blaze, much to the annoyance of Kevin, who states that Okaruto's opponent isn't just Kevin but the entire team. Kevin manages to score quickly with his sure-kill shoot, the Dragon Crash, giving Raimon the first point. Kevin scores the second point the same way, much to the annoyance of Okaruto. Okaruto begin their counterattack and the coach starts to utter a strange incantation. Their captain, Hiroyuki Yuukoku, initiates a technique called Ghost Lock, which causes Raimon to be unable to move, enabling Okaruto to easily score a point using their Phantom Shoot. Raimon tries to score another point, but are stopped by Okaruto's goalkeeper who uses Warp Space. Okaruto uses Ghost Lock once again to score another point, making the score 2-2, and then 2-3. During half time, Evans thinks about the Okaruto's coach's strange incantation and wonders if it has something to do with Ghost Lock. During the match, Evans studies Ghost Lock carefully and figures out the meaning of the chant. He quickly counters the 'curse' by shouting 'rumble rumble rumble break', which frees everyone from Ghost Lock. He blocks the next attack with his new sure-kill move, the Fireball Knuckle. After Evans and Megane explain that Ghost Lock was an audio-visual hypnosis, Evans throws the ball to Someoka. Blaze realizes that the reason why no one can score is because Okaruto's goalkeeper uses another hypnosis trick. Knowing this, Kevin uses Dragon Crash to pass the ball to Blaze, who scores using Fire Tornado. This new combo technique is dubbed Dragon Tornado by Willy.
5	"Where's the Secret Technique Manual?!"; Transliteration: "Hiden-sho wa doko da!" (Japanese: 秘伝書はどこだ!)	November 2, 2008	July 29, 2011 January 6, 2017 (South Africa)
At the Football Frontier team selection, it is revealed that Raimon's first opponent is Wild Jr. High. At the soccer club, everyone is introduced to the new transfer student, Bobby Domon, who wants to join the team. He and Aki confirm that they know each other. Evans welcomes him eagerly and claims that they're going to win the Football Frontier, but Domon warns him that Wild have very good jumping abilities. Evans dismisses his warning by saying that they have many powerful shoots, but Domon still insists that Wild could beat them with their jumping ability and intercept any of their sure-kill techniques. Evans decides that the answer to their problem is to create a new sure-kill technique. During their practice, the team's driver, Furukabu, interrupts them and talks to them about the legendary Inazuma Eleven, whose coach was Evans's grandfather. Fuyukai is seen talking to Kageyama through his cell phone and saying that there's no doubt that they'll lose against Wild. Later that day, Evans talks to his mother about his grandfather but receives an "I don't know" as the only response. His father explains to him, in his room, how his mother believes that soccer brought harm to David and then pats his shoulder thrice. He tells Evans before leaving his room that even though he does not know much about soccer, he knows that sports is good for boys his age. The next day, they continue their practice, but no one seems able to come up with a technique. After visiting a noodle shop called Rairaiken and getting a clue about David Evans's secret notebook from the boss of the restaurant, Evans and the others start to look for it. Nelly manages to locate the notebook for them, although no one apart from Evans can read it. Evans reads out the description for a sure-kill technique called Inazuma Drop, although no one can understand the description. During practice, Blaze figures out what the description meant, and Evans decides to pair Blaze and Jack together for the new technique. They start their special training.
6	"This is the Inazuma Drop!"; Transliteration: "Kore ga Inazuma Otoshi da!" (Japanese: これがイナズマ落としだ!)	November 9, 2008	August 1, 2011; January 9, 2017 (South Africa)
The episode starts with Jack and Blaze practicing their jumps to master the Inazuma Drop. After Evans and Aki's observation, Kabeyama has problems with his landing yet Blaze lands perfectly. Now, all they need to do is coordinate. After the first try, Jack states that he is scared of heights, which caused him to have problems with his landing. Aki suggests having him look at Blaze so he wouldn't look down. Jack gives another try but still looks down. Nelly appears and assumes that the work she had gone through finding the secret manual was a waste of time. Evans argues that he has trust in Blaze and Jack that they will master the Inazuma Drop and finds a special training that suits Jack. After a series of trials, the team finally begins their usual practice except for Bobby, who states that he'll take it easy for a bit since he is a newcomer. Blaze and Jack practice their coordination for the Inazuma Drop but keep failing, since Jack keeps looking down, causing Blazr to lose balance. At the end of practice, Jack walks to the Inazuma Tower Plaza where he sees Blaze training with Evans. The next day, Raimon arrives at Wild Jr. High and sees three fans cheering for them: Sam Kabeyama (Jack's younger brother) and two of his friends. Jack then gets discouraged due to his brother boasting about Jack's team defeating Royals. The team goes on the field and starts the kickoff. Blaze starts with Fire Tornado but the ball gets stolen by Wild's captain, Ryouta Torii. That's when Raimon realizes the opponent's jump power. Wild counterattacks and shoots with Condor Dive and Tarzan Kick. Evans uses Hot-Blooded Punch to deflect the ball. The ball goes to Kevin, but Shishiou, a defender for Nose, tackles him and gives him a leg injury. Therefore, Raimon switches Kevin to Bobby, then makes Jack a forward. Jack and Blaze try the Inazuma Drop but lose balance. The whistle blows and half time is up. Due to the strong attacks with no end, Evans ends up getting his hands sore but still refuses to give up. The defenders know they can't let Evans protect the goal in his condition so they, too, help protect the goal from Wild's powerful shots. After a while, Jack notices that his teammates are tired and exhausted but still won't give up, so he decides to try the Inazuma Drop again. This time Jack turns his back towards the ground, whilst Blaze steps on his belly, and together they score a point with the Inazuma Drop. The whistle blows and Raimon wins 1-0. The episode ends with Royals's commander talking in the phone.
7	"Duel at the Riverbank!"; Transliteration: "Kasenshiki no Kettō!" (Japanese: 河川敷の決闘!)	November 16, 2008	August 2, 2011; January 10, 2017 (South Africa)
The episode starts with the simulation training of Mikage Sennou's soccer team; they are getting data from Raimon to ensure their victory in their upcoming match. Later on the day, Raimon is training at the riverbank, where they spot whom they think are their fans on the bridge. Endou tells everyone to show them their sure-kill techniques. Then, Natsumi's car drives to the field and Natsumi says that practicing their techniques is forbidden. Endou asks why they can't, wherein Natsumi answers that those are not fans but actually spies, causing everyone to be shocked. That night, Mikage Sennou's captain and forward, Takeshi Sugimori and Arata Shimozuru, speak with Kidou. The next day, Sugimori and Arata are spying on Raimon. They find out that they aren't using their sure-kill techniques and ask why. Later on, Endou challenges them to a match. The match starts and Arata uses Fire Tornado, shocking everyone. Endou uses Hot-Blooded Punch but fails to block it. Later, Gouenji uses his own Fire Tornado against Sugimori, but he stops it with his Shoot Pocket, which Raimon is also shocked about. Later, Natsumi leads them to the secret Inabikari Training Center, once used by the original Inazuma Eleven, to show everyone that they can do better training there. After the training everyone is exhausted, but Endou says that they should train every day in the secret training facility. Domon says he doesn't want to go back to the training facility, but still ends up going back to it. On the day of the match, Raimon is surprised about the Stadium. At the end, Endou and Sugimori talk to each other.
8	"The Fearful Soccer Cyborgs!"; Transliteration: "Kyōfu no Sakkā Saibōgu!" (Japanese: 恐怖のサッカーサイボーグ!)	November 23, 2008	August 3, 2011; January 11, 2017 (South Africa)
Endou meets Sugimori in the locker rooms and Sugimori says he knows the percentage of Raimon winning the match. Endou asks how much it is and Sugimori replies with a non-like answer, "You better not ask". At the start of the match, Mikage Sennou's players don't move at all. Then, Sugimori commands Defense Formation Gamma 3. The players do what they're told and Someoka shoots Dragon Crash but it quickly loses power while going through a line of players. This causes Sugimori to catch it easily. Sugimori states that he knows Raimon's attack patterns, which is exactly the same as the data. Hence, they can make easy predictions. Mikage Sennou counterattacks and uses Attack Formation Beta 2. Kazemaru quickly slide tackles and breaks their formation, but Mikage Sennou quickly steals back the ball and passes many Raimon defenders. They begin their shoots but Endou catches them. When Endou is about to pass it, the opponent already marked all of Raimon. Luckily, Kazemaru shakes off his mark and passes to Gouenji. Gouenji uses Fire Tornado but Sugimori easily stops it with Shoot Pocket. Someoka runs up and does Dragon Tornado with Gouenji. Sugimori catches it this time with some difficulty using Shoot Pocket again. Again, Kabeyama runs up and does Inazuma Drop with Gouenji. This time the danger level of the shot goes to red, making Sugimori use a stronger technique, Rocket Fist and block it. Mikage Sennou shoots again while Endou withstands it with Hot-Blooded Punch. With the loose ball, another player forwards and does a hat trick with a finishing heading, which gives a score to Mikage Sennou. They are now just keeping the ball and passing it around without attacking. The whistle blows and it is half-time. While walking back to the locker rooms, Endou tells Sugimori that not attacking is not even called soccer. Sugimori says it was the coach's orders and explains that whether it's a 1-point victory or a 10-point, it's still the same victory. They will wait for the time to end without taking any risks. Sugimori says he believes he has all the data about Raimon and they will lose. Endou argues back that the Goddess of Victory will smile upon those who believe they'll win and asks if that soccer is fun. This leaves Sugimori confused. Endou then concludes that soccer is a fun sport and Raimon will show it to them. The second half starts with Mikage Sennou keeping the ball. Then, the coach orders the players to crush Raimon but Sugimori objects it. Endou thinks that if they won't attack, there is no point of him staying at the goal, so he runs up and joins to attack. He steals the ball and shoots toward Sugimori. Sugimori asks Endou why he joined the offense; Endou replies, "To score points, of course. That's soccer!" This leaves Sugimori confused once again. Raimon steals the ball again and moves up, but Mikage Sennou steals the ball back and starts attacking. Arata uses Patriot Shoot but Endou blocks it. Mikage Sennou starts with a corner kick. Endou runs up and tells Gouenji to follow him. Arata uses Patriot Shoot again but Endou and Gouenji shoot the ball back with a new sure-kill technique, the Inazuma No. 1, and tie the score. Raimon gets the ball again and shoots with Dragon Tornado. Sugimori uses Shoot Pocket to counter it but it goes in. Mikage Sennou's coach breaks the connection between the players. The rest of the players decide to give up. Someoka shoots Dragon Crash but Sugimori stops it with Shoot Pocket. Sugimori takes off the wires on his head and the other players follow. He tells the team to not give up until the last second. Mikage Sennou counterattacks. The match goes on and on with both teams going back and forth. When Gouenji uses Fire Tornado, Arata counters it back to block Gouenji. Both people fall down but Arata manages to pass the ball. Sugimori starts running with the ball away from the goal and shoots it toward Endou who then catches it with God Hand. The match ends and Raimon wins 2-1. Around the building, Detective Onigawara catches Fuyukai talking on the phone with Kageyama and says he will not forgive people who ruin soccer. At the end of the episode, Raimon realizes Gouenji has broken his leg. This means that Raimon must play in the next match without Gouenji.
9	"Megane, Stand!"; Transliteration: "Megane, Tatsu!" (Japanese: 目金、立つ!)	November 30, 2008	August 4, 2011; January 12, 2017(South Africa)
Endou and his team don't know much about their next opponent, Shuuyou Meito, besides them beating Okaruto. So, as suggested by Megane, they go to a maid cafe where said team hangs out, to know more about them. Not too long after, Raimon "meets" the team, as well as their captain, Raito "Novel" Noberu, and their midfielder, Moe "Mangaka" Manga, who are later revealed to be the authors of what Megane claims to be the "most well-known moe manga in history", Magical Princess Silky Nana. This results in Megane getting along with them nicely. On the day of the match, Raimon's managers are asked to wear maid costumes, resulting in Natsumi being in a sour mood while Otonashi and Aki happily agree to it. Not much action occurs on the first half due to the odd movements of Shuuyo Meito's members. Raimon's opponents are playing very defensive, but when the second half starts, they play aggressively and score the first goal. Raimon are down by one goal and Someoka isn't able to score goals against them because of the unusual sure-kill technique of their goalkeeper. Raimon is in a big trouble but help comes from an unlikely hero... Megane. He discovers how the opponents cheat, cleverly cuts through their defense while giving each a piece of his mind as a fellow otaku, makes a header to Dragon Crash (creating Megane Crash) and scores a goal. A second goal is easily scored by Someoka and Raimon wins the match.
10	"Teikoku's Spy!"; Transliteration: "Teikoku no Supai!" (Japanese: 帝国のスパイ!)	December 7, 2008	August 5, 2011; January 13, 2017 (South Africa)
Endou, with a few of the Raimon Eleven members and Domon, are walking home from school and decide to stop by at Rairaiken for a bite. Domon says he has to go off back home, but he stops halfway through and walks in an alley. He starts to mutter something through his phone. After his chat, he starts to feel dazed and guilty and almost gets run over by a truck. Aki meets him on the way back and mentions "Ichinose" in her tiny conversation with him. The next day, Domon heads off to the Raimon soccer club to take each of the members' training results from the Inabikari Training Center. He hesitates to take it and decides not to, because of his feelings of guilt. On the way back to his class, he notices Fuyukai with buckets in the garage where all of Raimon's buses are parked. He confronts Fuyukai and realizes that Fuyukai has set a trap on the bus they will ride on the way to their next match against Teikoku, because of a tiny clue from him saying 'Don't go on the bus that day'. Domon calls Kidou to meet him somewhere. Kidou expects Domon to have the training center results, but instead finds that Domon doesn't even have them with him. Instead, Domon tells Kidou about Kageyama ordering Fuyukai to lay a trap on the bus, something that Kidou didn't know. Later, Otonashi looks for Domon, and finds Kidou instead, revealing that they are biological siblings. At Kidou's house, he and his adoptive father have a tiny talk about Otonashi, Kidou mostly staying quiet since his confrontation with her. Endou and his team later go to Natsumi's dad's office, where they see Natsumi with a letter of confession from Domon, admitting everything about Fuyukai. They go to confront Fuyukai at the garage, and Natsumi officially fires him as a teacher there, but he then reveals to everyone that the letter was written by Domon, and that he was a spy for Teikoku Academy. Domon runs off to the riverbank, and Aki follows him. They have a short talk and get interrupted as Endou invites Domon to practice with him, forgiving him despite Domon formerly being Teikoku's spy. Later, Natsumi tells them that Raimon does not have a coach anymore and thus may not be able to participate in the finals of the Football Frontier Kanto Regionals. Will they be able to find a new coach before the finals? Or will they be unable to participate at all?
11	"Find a New Coach!"; Transliteration: "Shin Kantoku o Sagase!" (Japanese: 新監督を探せ!)	December 14, 2008	August 8, 2011; January 16, 2017 (South Africa)
The big game against Teikoku is only a few days away. The members of Teikoku are practicing their technique, Death Zone. By firing Fuyukai, Raimon does not have a coach and that might lead to their disqualification, which some of the boys blame Natsumi for. Endou tries to motivate the others to start looking for a new coach before the game, but the others look low. They believe they can't just hire anyone to be their coach. Kageno scares everyone in the room with his dark aura. Realizing that he knew about Daisuke's notebook, Gouenji gives Endou the idea to ask the Rairaiken shop owner, Seigou Hibiki, to become their new coach, which they do. However, Hibiki doesn't show any interest in becoming their coach and rejects his proposal. To convince him, Endou brings out the fact that Hibiki knew about the secret manual and Domon mentions that he might have played with Endou's grandfather. However, Hibiki still isn't convinced to join and tries to scare them that being a legendary team will only bring them disaster. He tells the kids that if they don't order anything, they have to leave. Endou wants to order a bowl of ramen, but realizes he left his wallet in the clubroom, so Hibiki throws all of them out. Detective Onigawara is inside the restaurant and mentions that Endou knows how to use the God Hand. Natsumi is on her laptop trying to find a member of the Inazuma Eleven to take Fuyukai's place as a coach, but all the data about the soccer club from forty years ago has been deleted. The boys are on the field practicing, but Kabeyama feels too down to even move. He feels like they've already lost since they can't find a coach. Endou tries to encourage him, telling him that they'll definitely find one. This causes Kabeyama to cling hard to Endou, which brings a smile on the others' faces. While Endou is complaining to Kabeyama to let him go, Kidou pays them a visit. The members of Raimon think he wants to laugh at them for nearly being disqualified, but he wants to apologize for the incidents with Fuyukai and Domon. Kidou says that he's envious of them because Raimon win the matches with their own abilities, while Teikoku only win due to following their commanders' orders. Endou tries to convince him that this is not true and offers Kidou to practice with them, which he refuses it for now, but states they might do it in the near future. Masaru Anzai, a subordinate of Kageyama, tells him about Raimon's efforts to find a coach, stating that they asked the owner of Rairaiken to be their coach. At night, Kageyama pays Hibiki a visit only to brag about Teikoku being invincible. After getting a phone call from Kidou's father, who's worried about his son, he orders the driver to bring him to their mansion. Kidou is having an identity crisis, wondering who he exactly is. Kageyama tells him that ever since he was six, he was already a perfect being, the one he had been looking for, which is why he recommended him to the Kidou Financial Group. The two of them are having conflicting moralities about what soccer really is. When Kageyama tries touching Kidou's magazine, he immediately retracts it from his hands. Before leaving, Kageyama reminds Kidou one last time who he is. Raimon have only two days left until the match with Teikoku and they still haven't found a coach. Endou decides to ask Hibiki again. He meets Onigawara for the first time, who introduces himself as a detective. He wants to help Endou find a new coach because he has always been a fan of the Inazuma Eleven and after seeing Endou's God Hand during their practice match with Teikoku, he's convinced they can be revived. He also reveals to Endou the tragedy that happened forty years ago, which made the members of Inazuma Eleven to stop caring about soccer. After the detective tells him that Hibiki was the goalkeeper of the team and Daisuke's pupil, Endou thanks him and immediately dashes to Hibiki's restaurant. Endou, without giving up, challenges Hibiki. If he can stop all three of Hibiki's shoots, Hibiki must become their new coach. Fortunately, Endou successfully blocks all three shoots and manages to find Raimon a new coach.
12	"The Finals: Royal Academy-First Half!!/The Final Against the Royal Academy, Part One!"; Transliteration: "Kessen! Teikoku Gakuen Zenpen!!" (Japanese: 決戦!帝国学園・前編!!)	December 21, 2008	August 9, 2011; January 17, 2017 (South Africa)
The Raimon 11 arrived at Teikoku Gakuen for the biggest game of their lives, but before they can begin they had to dispel the cloud of suspicion hanging over the place. Kageyama had set some kind of trap, he had secretly loosened the roof of the stadium they would be playing in, but Kidou figured it out. He quickly went to Endou to inform him of the danger, who believed him and got his team safe when the match started. Raimon thanked Kidou for his help and they played the finals in a fair manner. Will Endou and his team will be able to win this match?
13	"The Finals: Royal Academy-Second Half!! /The Final Against the Royal Academy, Part Two!"; Transliteration: "Kessen! Teikoku Gakuen Kōhen!!" (Japanese: 決戦!帝国学園・後編!!)	December 28, 2008	August 10, 2011; January 18, 2017 (South Africa)
With Kageyama safely shut away, the game against Teikoku Gakuen has properly begun, and it's a real game this time. Whoever wins this comes out on top. But with the story about Kidou and Haruna in his head, will Endou hesitate on winning the game?
14	"The Legendary Eleven!"/The Legendary Team!"; Transliteration: "Densetsu no Irebun!" (Japanese: 伝説のイレブン!)	January 4, 2009	August 11, 2011; March 6, 2017 (South Africa)
Raimon still can't believe they beat Teikoku Gakuen and are the new District Champion. After the celebratory dust settles, a mysterious figure walks into Hibiki's ramen bar. Is he really from the legendary Inazuma Eleven? Coach Hibiki decides to revive back the legendary Inazuma Eleven and calls for a practice match between The Inazuma Eleven and the Raimon Junior High. There the Inazuma Eleven shows the Raimon Junior High some new hissatsu techniques and Raimon were able to perfect the Honoo no Kazamidori.
15	"This is It:The National Tournament!/The National Tournament Finally Begins!"; Transliteration: "Kita ze! Zenkoku Taikai!!" (Japanese: 来たぜ!全国大会!!)	January 11, 2009	August 12, 2011/ March 7, 2017 (Nicktoons Africa)
Raimon have set their sights on the Nationals Tournament and they're determined to win it. They're working hard to get there, but there are many obstacles – first there's the threat to their precious clubhouse but Endou is able to save it. Secondly, there is a possibility that Kazemaru might leave the team after meeting up once more Miyasaka Ryou and his other friends of Raimon's Athletics Club. Will his passion for soccer make him remain in the team?
16	"Soccer: Ninja Style!/Let's Beat the Ninja School!"; Transliteration: "Yabure! Ninja Sakkā!!" (Japanese: 破れ!忍者サッカー!!)	January 18, 2009	August 15, 2011/March 8, 2017(Nicktoons Africa)
With Kazemaru still on the team, for now, Raimon can move forward and concentrate on the Nationals. And they'll need to – their first game is against the speedy Sengoku Igajima Junior High. If they don't win this, the dream is over before it's even begun!
17	"Jude's Decision! /Jude's Decision!"; Transliteration: "Kidō no Ketsui!" (Japanese: 鬼道の決意!)	January 25, 2009	August 16, 2011/March 9, 2017 (Nicktoons Africa)
The narrow victory over Sengoku Igajima has given Raimon confidence, but on the other side of the tournament, everyone is shock at Teikoku Gakuen's complete defeat at the hands of Zeus Junior High, which is 10-0. What should Kidou do? If Raimon wants to beat them, they'll need to train even harder, and maybe even recruit new members!
18	""Break the Unbreakable Wall!"/"Break Through the Never-Ending Wall!""; Transliteration: "Kudake! Mugen no Kabe!!" (Japanese: 砕け!無限の壁!!)	February 1, 2009	August 17, 2011/ March 10, 2017 (Nicktoons Africa)
With their firepower boosted by the addition of Kidou Yuuto, the team are ready to tackle Senbayama Junior High and their unbreakable defense. But unless they get their pass coordinated, all their hard work will come to nothing! Will they able to break the iron defense?
19	"The Reincarnated Genius! /A Star Returns!"; Transliteration: "Yomigaetta Tensai!" (Japanese: よみがえった天才!)	February 8, 2009	August 18, 2011/March 13, 2017 (Nicktoons Africa)
Ichinose Kazuya is back! Like a phoenix he has risen from the ashes and come back to visit his old friends. Just in time too, Raimon is desperate for some new moves, and the Tri-Pegasus is just what they need. But can they perfect it in time?
20	"The Killer Triangle Z! /The Definitive Technique: The Z Triangle!"; Transliteration: "Hissatsu no Toraianguru Z!" (Japanese: 必殺のトライアングルZ!)	February 15, 2009	August 19, 2011/March 14, 2017 (Nicktoons Africa)
Raimon are getting ready to play their next big opponent – Kidokawa Seishuu, which just happens to be Gouenji's old school. Certain members of that team still carry a grudge against him and will stop at nothing to get their revenge. This results into a practice match with the Mukata triplets vs Endou. Unfortunately, Endou doesn't stand a chance against Triangle Z! Will Raimon lose at this rate?
21	""The Clash With Kirkwood Jnr. High"/"A Fierce Duel With Kirkwood!""; Transliteration: "Gekitō! Kidokawa Seishū!!" (Japanese: 激闘!木戸川清修!!)	February 22, 2009	August 22, 2011/March 15, 2017 (Nicktoons Africa)
The Mukata triplets and their grudge are dominating Raimon at every turn, but they need to find the strength to overcome their malice if they're going to make it to the final. They are trying to take on everyone on their own, and not co-operating with the others. If they don't work together, their dream is finished!
22	"Go Beyond the God Hand! /I'll Get Past the God Hand!"; Transliteration: "Goddo Hando o Koero!" (Japanese: ゴッドハンドを超えろ!)	March 1, 2009	August 23, 2011/March 16, 2017 (Nicktoons Africa)
Raimon Junior High are through to the finals, but they're all getting nervous about playing the terrifying Zeus Junior High. Endou is convinced he's not good enough, and if that weren't enough to rattle nerves, it seems that Kageyama is working on some fiendish plot behind the scenes. Will he sabotage Raimon?
23	"A Challenge from a God!/Challenged By a God!"; Transliteration: "Kami no Chōsen-jō!" (Japanese: 神の挑戦状!)	March 8, 2009	August 24, 2011/March 17, 2017 (Nicktoons Africa)
As the finals against Zeus draws nearer, so does Raimon's anticipation and dread. The team are working hard, but the level they have to reach seems beyond their grasp. Will they get it together in time for the finals?
24	"Time For Training Camp!/Let's Go to Training Camp!"; Transliteration: "Gasshuku Yarou ze!" (Japanese: 合宿やろうぜ!)	March 15, 2009	August 25, 2011/March 20, 2017 (Nicktoons Africa)
The big game with Zeus is almost on top of them but Endou still hasn't mastered Majin The Hand. Coach Hibiki decided that everyone should spend the night at school as a sleepover training camp. The members of Inazuma Eleven brought a machine with them which was used by Hibiki to master the Majin The Hand which in turn didn't work out well for him. Endou practiced on it very hard and at last, he was able to complete the obstacle course with the help of his teammates. Gouenji, Kidou and Coach Hibiki used Inazuma Break a few times at Endou and Endou was able to stop the balls but still he didn't manage to master Majin The Hand. The team's aura was at first down, but after Otonashi's convincing that their soccer is to shoot more than the opponents did, everyone regained their confidence.
25	"The Final Battle!/The Last Playoff!"; Transliteration: "Saigo no Kessen!" (Japanese: 最後の決戦!)	March 22, 2009	August 26, 2011/March 21, 2017 (Nicktoons Africa)
This is it, the finals of the Nationals has arrived. Zeus storm to an early lead of three goals and nothing Raimon does has any effect on them. Are they really gods? Or is something else going on? Either way, if Raimon don't turn the game around they're going to get annihilated!
26	"God Vs Majin!/Clash! God VS Devil!!"; Transliteration: "Gekitotsu! Kami VS Majin!!" (Japanese: 激突!神VS魔神!!)	March 29, 2009	August 29, 2011/March 22, 2017 (Nicktoons Africa)
Raimon are down by three goals and are getting clobbered by the Zeus after losing IE 26 HQ soccer gods of Zeus. The situation looks completely hopeless and the clock is running down. All the players of Raimon are down by the unnatural strength of Zeus, who are using Aqua of Gods, which is a kind of water that gives a supernatural power to humans. All Raimon players have lost the hope and Aphrodi is striking the ball at Endou, but Endou is stopping each of them by his body. By seeing his strength, Aphrodi becomes impatient and shoots God Knows at Endou. Endou suddenly realizes the secret to master Majin The Hand and stops the ball. Suddenly, all Raimon players become fearless and Gouenji and Kidou score three goals, one after the other, and the score is tied. Then, with a combination of The Phoenix and Fire Tornado, Raimon scores the final goal and wins the match with the score 4-3, finally winning the Football Frontier.
