= Hayami =

Hayami (written: はやみ, 速水, 速見 or 早見) is a Japanese surname and can refer to:

- Yuji Hayami, science fiction and fantasy writer.
- Masaru Hayami (1925–2009), Japanese businessman from Kobe.
- Yū Hayami, J-pop singer and TV actress.
- Mokomichi Hayami (born 1984), Japanese actor.
- Gyoshū Hayami (1894–1935), Japanese painter in the Nihonga style.
- Saori Hayami (born 1991), Japanese voice actress and singer.
- Show Hayami (born 1958), Japanese voice actor and singer.
- Noriko Hayami (born 1959), Japanese actress.
- Dogen Handa (1914–1974), known as Hayami Handa, a professional Go player.

== Fictional characters ==
- Atsushi Hayami, one of the main protagonists in Gunparade March.
- Daisuke Hayami, from MegaMan NT Warrior (Rockman EXE) anime and manga.
- Kohinata Hayami, H2O: Footprints in the Sand character.
- Rena Hayami, R:Racing Evolution character.
- Takumi Hayami, Sky Girls character.
- Rinka Hayami (速水 凛香), a character in the Assassination Classroom anime and manga
- Umika Hayami, a character in Kaitou Sentai Lupinranger VS Keisatsu Sentai Patranger.
- Sena Hayami, a character in Mashin Sentai Kiramager.
- Tsurumasa Hayami, a character in Inazuma Eleven GO (season 1), Inazuma Eleven GO: Chrono Stone (TV series) and Inazuma Eleven GO: Galaxy (TV series).

== See also ==
- Hayami District, Ōita
