= T-Pistonz+KMC =

Japanese pop group

- Also known as: TPK, Pisuke
- Origin: Fukuoka, Kyushu
- Genres: Bubblegum pop; pop rock; pop rap
- Years active: 2008–2014
- Labels: FRAME/Level-5/Avex (2012 to 2014); FRAME/Level-5/Up-Front (2008 to 2012) hachama (2008)
- Members: KMC; Ton-Nino; Hiroshi Dot; In-Chiquita; Hiroshi Dot
- Past members: Brother Hide King (Guitarist); Don Ringo (Drums); Brother A King (Guitarist); Ebirina (Dancer); Shu Mai Mai (Dancer)

T-Pistonz+KMC (ティーピストンズプラスケムシ, Ti Pīsutonzu purasu Kemushi) was a Japanese pop group that formerly operated under the "FRAME" label; a joint venture between Level-5, with the Avex Group and formerly with the Up-Front Group. They actually debuted on UFG imprint "hachama".

They performed the theme songs of Nintendo DS software and TV animation series, "Inazuma Eleven".

== History ==
In 2008, T-Pistonz was formed from a four-man punk rock band, Tonkotsu Pistons. A Japanese choreographer, Lucky Ikeda a.k.a. In-Chiquita has been working with them.

Since "Maji de Kansha"(released in June 2009), KMC, a rapper, joined and they used the name "T-Pistonz+KMC".

Their 5th single "Katte Nakōze!"(March, 2010) made it high up the Oricon weekly chart.

All of their singles have been used as theme songs for the Nintendo DS, Nintendo 3DS and Wii software and TV animation series, "Inazuma Eleven", "Inazuma Eleven GO", "Inazuma Eleven GO: Chrono Stone" and "Inazuma Eleven GO: Galaxy".

On September 16, 2014, the band formally announced their dissolving on the official website.

== Members ==
=== Current members ===
- KMC — rapper
- Ton-Nino — singer
- Hiroshi Dot — singer
- In-Chiquita — dancer and choreographer

=== Former members ===
- Brother A. King — guitarist (until September 2011)
- Ebirina — dancer (until September 2011)
- Shu Mai-Mai — dancer (until September 2011)
- Brother Hide King — guitarist (until July 2010)
- Don Ringo — drums (until July 2010)

== Discography ==
=== Singles ===
- Ri-yo ~Seishun no Inazuma Eleven~ (released on August 27, 2008)
- Tachiagari-yo (released on November 26, 2008)
- Maji de Kansha! (released on June 10, 2009)
- Tsunagari-yo (released on November 4, 2009)
- Katte Nakōu Ze! (released on March 10, 2010)
- Ultra Katte Nakōu Ze!/Vamos!Nippon (released on May 26, 2010)
- GOOD Kita-!/Genki ni Nari-yo! (released on July 14, 2010)
- Bokura no Goal!/Matane...no Kisetsu (released on February 23, 2011)
- Ten Made Todoke!/Minna Atsumari-yo! (released on July 6, 2011)
- Naseba Narunosa Nanairo Tamago (released on October 26, 2011)
- Ohayō! Shining Day/Uchiku Dark! (released on February 15, 2012)
- Jōnetsu de Mune Atsu! (released on June 20, 2012)
- Kandōu Kyōuyuū! (released on July 4, 2012)
- Kokoro Korogase! (released on July 18, 2012)
- Shoshin wo KEEP ON! (released on October 31, 2012)
- Raimei! Blue Train! (released on January 9, 2013)

=== Albums ===
==== Studio albums ====
- Ganbari-yo! (released on December 22, 2010)
- Gorilla Beat wa Lucky7 (released on November 30, 2011)
- Hakkaku!? ThiriThiri7 (released on September 26, 2012)

==== Compilation album ====
- T-Pistonz+KMC Story-yo! ~Hajimete no Best~ (released on February 22, 2012)

== Appearances ==
=== DVD ===
- T-Pistonz+KMC LIVE TPKing Vol.1 (released on September 26, 2012)

=== Concerts ===
- Inazuma Eleven Raimon-chū Bunkasai (August 21, 2010 - January 23, 2011, Japan)
- T-Pistonz+KMC Christmas Live ~ Christmas dayo Nanairo Tamago~ (December 25, 2011, Shibuya TAKE OFF7, Tokyo, Japan)
- TPKing Vol.1 (April 8, 2012, Mt.RAINIER HALL SHIBUYA PLEASURE PLEASURE, Tokyo, Japan)
- TPKing Vol.2 (August 25, 2012, duo MUSIC EXCHANGE, Tokyo, Japan)
- TPKing Vol.2.5
  - November 23, 2012, Nagoya HeartLand STUDIO, Aichi, Japan
  - November 24, 2012, Umeda Shangri-La, Osaka, Japan
- TPKing Vol.3 ~Ichinen buri no Christmas~ (December 24, 2012, Yokohama BLITZ, Kanagawa, Japan)
