= Ganbari-yo! =

Studio album by T-Pistonz+KMC
- Released: December 22, 2010 (JP)
- Genres: J-pop, Anison
- Label: FRAME

T-Pistonz+KMC chronology
Ganbari-yo! (2010)	Gorilla Beat wa Lucky7 (2011)

Singles from Ganbari-yo!
- 1. "Maji de Kansha!" Released: June 10, 2009; 2. "Tsunagari-yo" Released: November 4, 2009; 3. "Katte Nakōze!" Released: March 10, 2010; 4. "GOOD Kita-!/Genki ni Nari-yo!" Released: July 14, 2010

Ganbari-yo! (がんばリーヨ!) is the 1st studio album by the Japanese pop group T-Pistonz+KMC. It was released on December 22, 2010.

== Track listing ==
No.	Title	Lyrics	Music	Arrangement	Length
1.	"Ganbari-yo!" (がんばリーヨ!)	KMC	KMC	KMC+SKT
2.	"Tsunagari-yo" (つながリーヨ; Opening theme song of an anime television series Inazuma Eleven: episode55-67, a video game Inazuma Eleven 2: Kyōi no Shinryakusha Blizzard for the Nintendo DS.)	Tōru Yamasaki; Hiroshi Yamasaki; KMC	Tōru Yamasaki; Hiroshi Yamasaki	Shunsuke Suzuki
3.	"Kiai de Hurricane" (気合いでハリケーン; Opening theme song of a video game Inazuma Eleven 3: Sekai e no Chōsen!! The Ogre for the Nintendo DS.)	Tōru Yamasaki; KMC	Tōru Yamasaki; KMC	Tomoki Kikuya
4.	"Chīsana Koi no Monogatari" (小さな恋の物語)	Tōru Yamasaki; Hiroshi Yamasaki; KMC	Tōru Yamasaki	Tomoki Kikuya
5.	"Super Tachiagari-yo!" (スーパー立ち上がリーヨ! Opening theme song of an anime film Inazuma Eleven: Saikyō Gundan Ōga Shūrai.)	Tōru Yamasaki; KMC	Tōru Yamasaki; KMC	Tomoki Kikuya; Yoshinari Takegami
6.	"Katte Nakōze!" (勝って泣こうゼッ! Opening theme song of an anime television series Inazuma Eleven: episode68-87.)	Tōru Yamasaki; KMC	Tōru Yamasaki; KMC	Tomoki Kikuya; Yoshinari Takegami
7.	"Kakko E" (「E」)	Tōru Yamasaki; Hiroshi Yamasaki; KMC	Hiroshi Yamasaki; KMC	Tomoki Kikuya; Yoshinari Takegami
8.	"DASH!!!!"	KMC	KMC	KMC+SKT
9.	"GOOD Kita-!" (GOODキター! Opening theme song of an anime television series Inazuma Eleven: episode88-107, a video game Inazuma Eleven 3: Sekai e no Chōsen!! Spark for the Nintendo DS.)	Tōru Yamasaki; KMC	Tōru Yamasaki; Hiroshi Yamasaki; KMC	Tomoki Kikuya; Yoshinari Takegami
10.	"Subara C" (素晴らC)	Tōru Yamasaki; KMC	Tōru Yamasaki; KMC	Tomoki Kikuya; Yoshinari Takegami
11.	"Saikyō de Saikō" (最強で最高; Ending theme song of an anime film Inazuma Eleven: Saikyō Gundan Ōga Shūrai.)	Tōru Yamasaki; KMC	Tōru Yamasaki; KMC	Tomoki Kikuya
12.	"Maji de Kansha!" (マジで感謝! Opening theme song of an anime television series Inazuma Eleven: episode27-54.)	Tōru Yamasaki; Hiroshi Yamasaki; KMC	Tōru Yamasaki; Hiroshi Yamasaki	Tomoki Kikuya
13.	"Ganbari-yo! (Reprise)" (がんばリーヨ!（リプライズ）)	KMC	KMC	KMC+SKT
