= Inazuma Eleven GO: Chrono Stone (TV series) =

- Season 2
- Second Japanese DVD Box for Inazuma Eleven GO: Chrono Stone
- No. of episodes: 51

Release
- Original network: TV Tokyo
- Original release: April 18, 2012 – May 8, 2013

Series chronology
- ← Previous; GO Next → GO: Galaxy

Inazuma Eleven GO: Chrono Stone (イナズマイレブン GO クロノ・ストーン, Inazuma Irebun GO: Chrono Stone; lit. "Lightning Eleven GO: Chrono Stone") is the second season of the Japanese anime television series Inazuma Eleven GO. It is based on the Level-5 video game of the same title. The season consists of 51 episodes.

The season aired on the TV Tokyo network from April 18, 2012, to May 8, 2013. The season was produced by Level-5 in conjunction with TV Tokyo, Dentsu, and OLM.

After Tenma returns from Okinawa from tutoring the local children about soccer, he returns to Raimon, only to discover that the soccer club has never existed. Alpha, a person who comes from El Dorado, an organization from the future hell-bent on destroying soccer, tries to erase Tenma's soccer memories. With the assistance of Fei Rune and Clark Wonderbot, both came from the future, Tenma and his friends must defeat El Dorado in order to return soccer to the world.

== Summary ==
The story begins with following Raimon's success on the Holy Road soccer tournament. Tenma returns to Raimon Junior High, but finds out that things have changed. The Raimon members are not soccer players anymore. In fact, there is no soccer club at the school. Shinsuke is in a different club from Tenma. Is this a parallel world? Tenma wonders. That's when Alpha appears before him. Alpha wants to erase Tenma's passion for football.

== Characters ==
Arion Sherwind (松風(まつかぜ)天馬(てんま), Matsukaze Tenma)
is the main protagonist of the Inazuma Eleven GO series. He is a midfielder and he later became the captain for Raimon when Shindou Takuto got hospitalized. In the Chrono Stone series, he became a midfielder and captain for Tenmas, Raimon, Entaku no Kishi, El Dorado Team 03, Chrono Storm and Shinsei Inazuma Japan (alternate timeline).In the Galaxy series, he was chosen to be a midfielder and captain for Japan's team, Inazuma Japan. After the truth was revealed behind the FFIV2, he became a midfielder and captain for Earth Eleven.
Victor Blade (剣城(つるぎ)京介(きょうすけ), Tsurugi Kyōsuke)
is one of the main protagonists of the Inazuma Eleven GO series. He is a forward for Raimon, Raimon (Chrono Stone), El Dora Do Team 01, Chrono Storm and later in Galaxy, a forward for Inazuma Japan and Earth Eleven.
Riccardo Di Rigo (神童(しんどう)拓人(たくと), Shindō Takuto)
is a main protagonist of the Inazuma Eleven GO series. He was a forward, in the past, and midfielder and also the captain for Raimon. After he got hospitalized, he decided that Matsukaze Tenma should become captain for Raimon.In the Chrono Stone series, he became a defensive midfielder for Raimon, Entaku no Kishi, El Dorado Team 02, also being captain for the team, and for Chrono Storm.
Goldie Lemmon (菜花黄名子, Nanobana Kinako)
is a character of the Chrono Stone Series. She is a Defender for Raimon, Entaku no Kishi, El Do Rado Team 01 and Chrono Storm.

== Theme songs ==
Opening songs (Season 2/Chrono Stone)

1. Jōnetsu de Mune Atsu! (eps 1–17 odd) by T-Pistonz+KMC
2. Kandō Kyōyū! (eps 2–18 even) by T-Pistonz+KMC
3. Shoshin wo KEEP ON! (eps 19–35) by T-Pistonz+KMC
4. Raimei! BLUE TRAIN (eps 36–51) by T-Pistonz+KMC

Ending songs (Season 2/Chrono Stone)

1. Natsu ga Yattekuru (eps 1–18) by Sorano Aoi (CV: Sayaka Kitahara)
2. Te wo Tsunagō (eps 19–35) by Matsukaze Tenma (CV: Yuka Terasaki), Tsurugi Kyōsuke (CV: Takashi Oohara) & Sorano Aoi (CV: Sayaka Kitahara)
3. Bokutachi no Shiro (eps 36–50 even) by Matsukaze Tenma (CV: Yuka Terasaki), Tsurugi Kyousuke (CV: Takashi Oohara), Kirino Ranmaru (CV: Yu Kobayashi), Shindou Takuto (CV: Mitsuki Saiga) & Nishizono Shinsuke (CV: Haruka Tomatsu)
4. Seishun Oden (eps 37–51 odd) Sorano Aoi (CV: Sayaka Kitahara), Yamana Akane (CV: Yurin), Seto Midori (CV: Mina) & Nanobana Kinako (CV: Yuki Aoi)

== Episode list ==
No.	English title (Translated title)	Original release date
1	"Soccer Has Gone?!"; Transliteration: "Sakkā ga nakunatte imasu!" (Japanese: サッカーがなくなっています！)	April 18, 2012
The episode began with Matsukaze Tenma teaching young kids soccer at Okinawa. Afterwards, Tenma came back to Raimon Junior High after three months. Soon he bumped into Shindou, who then revealed through a short conversation, that there is no soccer club in Raimon Junior High. Refusing to believe what Shindou said, Tenma went around to visit the other members, however they all said the same thing. Sangoku was now in a Sumo Wrestling club, Hamano joined a fishing club, Hayami and Aoyama joined a tennis club, Kurumada joined an American Football Club; Kariya and Hikaru joined the music club; the others didn't join a club at all. When he gets around to meeting Shinsuke (who had joined a table tennis club), much to his surprise, Shinsuke didn't even know who Tenma is, and began to wonder whether he was famous or something. Later, he bumped into Aoi who then revealed herself to be in a Calligraphy Club. Feeling depressed, Tenma headed over to his usual soccer practice spot; however, he then was interrupted by a Alpha who began a brief, but harsh conversation with him. Suddenly, Alpha kicked a white colored soccer ball at him, engulfing them in bright light--- and once the light had gone, Tenma and Alpha were back in time to the time and place where young Tenma was going to save Sasuke.Tenma started wondering what he's doing here-- only to see that young Tenma had saved Sasuke but Gouenji didn't save them from the falling planks because Alpha shot to his ball in order to stop it. Tenma began to receive a terrible headache-- in other words, his memories of soccer were disappearing. Alpha continued talking to him, and stopped to kick the white soccer ball again. This time, they were transported to a field, where Alpha then revealed his team, Protocol Omega. Tenma unleashed Majin Pegasus Arc to fight back against them, however he received several harsh blows from each Omega Protocol member. When it was about to strike Tenma with the last blow, Alpha was stopped by a young green haired boy, revealing himself to be Fei Rune. He then revealed his own team, Tenmas, and changed into the team jersey, along with changing a confused Tenma into the jersey, and gave him the captain's band.Before the match began, Alpha teleported a random person to the field at which they were at, and brainwashed him into commentating for the match thus, commencing the match to begin. As they played, both teams seemed to be on the same level of skills, however, the no-score play stopped when Alpha summoned his keshin, only to use Keshin Armed with it, giving Alpha immense strength and power, scoring a goal immediately. Shortly after, the Inazuma TM Caravan appeared up in the sky, much to Fei's joy, the driver of the caravan being Clark Wonderbot.
2	"Tenma Beyond the time!" Transliteration: "Jikan o koete tenba!" (Japanese: 時間を超えて天馬！)	April 25, 2012
The match of Tenmas versus Protocol Omega continues but it is suddenly halted as Protocol Omega instead attacks 10 years before, in other words they plan to stop Endou Mamoru making the Raimon soccer club. And now, it's up to Fei Rune and Matsukaze Tenma to stop El Dorado's plans.
3	"Revive! Raimon"; Transliteration: "Ribaibu! Kaminarimon" (Japanese: リバイブ！雷門)	May 2, 2012
4	"Last Soccer"; Transliteration: "Saigo no sakkā" (Japanese: 最後のサッカー)	May 9, 2012
5	"Dismay! Soccer Ban"; Transliteration: "Rōbai! Sakkā Kinshirei" (Japanese: 狼狽！サッカー禁止令)	May 23, 2012
6	"Fierce! Protocol Omega 2.0"; Transliteration: "Hageshī! Purotokoruomega 2. 0" (Japanese: 激しい！プロトコルオメガ2.0)	May 30, 2012
Raimon plays against Protocol Omega 2.0 but many players got injured and get switched out. Beta used her Sphere Device to brainwash the Raimon members and to seal Fei away. Instead of Fei, Endou got sealed away and Raimon returned to their own timeline. The Raimon members without a Keshin left the team, leaving the remaining members shocked...
7	"Training at God Eden!"; Transliteration: "Kami eden de no torēningu!" (Japanese: 神エデンでのトレーニング！)	June 6, 2012
8	"Heat Up! Keshin Armed!!"; Transliteration: "Hītoappu! Keshin busō!" (Japanese: ヒートアップ！化身武装！)	June 13, 2012
9	"Get The Holy Book of Champions!"; Transliteration: "Chanpionzu no seinaru bukku o nyūshu!" (Japanese: チャンピオンズの聖なるブックを入手！)	June 20, 2012
The Raimon team saw how their soccer building was being demolished due to the soccer ban. In order to prevent any further harm caused to their soccer by El Dorado they plan to travel to the future and to infiltrate the soccer museum to steal the Hasha no Seiten. Tenma tried to get the book but he accidentally got touched by the alarm which eventually goes off. Back in their timeline, they decided to read the scriptures in Tenma's house. Only to discover from Kino Aki that the handwriting in the Hasha no Seiten is that from Endou Daisuke and only he and Endou Mamoru could read it.
10	"A Shocking Reunion! Endou Daisuke!!"; Transliteration: "Shokkingureyunion! Endō Daisuke!" (Japanese: ショッキングレユニオン！円堂大介！)	June 27, 2012
Raimon is looking at the Hasha no Seiten but they can't figure out what is written in the book. Aki and Haruna stated that only Endou and Daisuke could read the book and that Daisuke had already died. Then, Wonderbot said that they should go back in time and afterwards, Kidou appeared having been told the details by Gouenji and went with Raimon back in time.
11	"Find It! The Strongest Eleven of All Time !?"; Transliteration: "Sore o mitsukete kudasai! Subete no jikan no saikyō no irebun?" (Japanese: それを見つけて下さい！すべての時間の最強のイレブン？)	July 4, 2012
During the second half, Fei Rune, Shinsuke, Takuto, Kyousuke, Ryouma and Tenma all attempt to figure out the true meaning of "3D". They aren't focusing on the match. When Tsurugi got the ball, he called his Keshin and tried to fuse with it but failed. Kuosu stole the ball from Tsurugi and passed to Reiza, who passed to Beta. Beta shot and Shinsuke used Buttobi Jump but failed to stop it. Fei came near the goal and he got blocked. He then passed to Nishiki who missed it. Tenma used Nishiki to get the ball in the air but Orca knock it away. Shindou then realized what Daisuke meant with 3D and so did Kidou. Shindou stole the ball from Reiza and said to start with their tactic and kicked the ball into the air. Raimon used their new hissatsu tactic, 3D Reflector. Tenma used his Keshin and then Armed, after that he scored the first goal. Einamu passed to Beta but Fei intercepted it, then Mixi Transed with Tyrano. Fei came near the goal and used Kodai no Kiba, scoring the second goal. The match resumed with Shindou having the ball. He passed to Tsurugi who used his Keshin and tried to Armed but failed again. Daisuke noticed what Tsurugi was doing and told him to "eat" his Keshin next time. Realizing that he shouldn't equip his Keshin on the outside but try to fuse on the inside, Tsurugi used Armed successfully. He then broke through Keeper Command 03 with his shoot, scoring the third goal.Beta didn't like that Raimon got the lead and used Ghost Mixi Max with her team, which made Protocol Omega 2.0 broke through Raimon's defense easily. Beta used her Keshin, then Armed and used Shoot Command 07. Shinsuke tried to call his Keshin but failed due to the shot was too fast and Beta scored the third goal. After that, Protocol Omega 2.0 scored two points and won with the end result of 5-3.
12	"Arrival! Nobunaga's Town!!"; Transliteration: "Tōchaku! Nobunaga no taun!" (Japanese: 到着！信長のタウン！)	July 11, 2012
Daisuke revealed that Shindou is the first one of the Ultimate Eleven and that he must fuse with Nobunaga. Wonderbot wanted to Mixi Max Shindou with Nobunaga but it failed. Dr. Crossword Arno explained that Shindou's and Nobunaga's energy levels are different and that Shindou has to fuse with Nobunaga by training. Raimon they arrived a place, where they see Beta mindcontrolling the whole Shiroshika Gang and now using them as subordinates and challenges Raimon to a soccer battle, with Beta acting as a coach for her respective gang.
13	"Huge Battle! Team White Deer!"; Transliteration: "Kyodaina batoru! Chīmu shiroshika!" (Japanese: 巨大なバトル！チーム白鹿！)	July 18, 2012
Raimon must play against Shiroshika to free the captives. At the end of the first half, Shiroshika was in lead with 2-0 because their forwards scored two goals with their shoot hissatsu Hinawa Bullet, and Shinsuke couldn't stop it. Also, Tasuke and the others didn't know how to play soccer. In the second half, Tasuke and his friends realized how to play soccer due to Shindou, who helped them with orders and with his hissatsu tactic, Kami no Takuto. Shinsuke mastered his Keshin Armed and stopped Hinawa Bullet. At the end of the second half, Raimon won with 10-2 from Shiroshika. Shindou glared to Shinsuke. In the night, Shindou went outside to train and said to himself that he must train to master Keshin Armed and to Mixi Max with Nobunaga. Okatsu went to Shindou and remarked about his graceful play style. Akane was spying on them and shocked Shindou and Okatsu when she went 'Eureka!' about an idea to infiltrate into the Cherry Blossom viewing which was inspired by Shindou's and Okatsu's conversation. Later, Shindou, Okatsu and Akane was seen at the house and Akane told the others about infiltrating into the Cherry Blossom viewing, which the others were shocked.
14	"Infiltrating! The Great Dancer Mission!"; Transliteration: "Sen'nyū! Idaina dansāmisshon!" (Japanese: 潜入！偉大なダンサーミッション！)	July 25, 2012
Raimon is learning how to dance in order to amaze Nobunaga. Shindou is training to Mixi Max with Nobunaga and to use his Keshin Armed. His Keshin Armed almost succeeded and Fei is joining the training. Tsurugi is watching Shindou and Fei and appear to be in deep thought. The next day, Raimon disguised as dancers and are trying to get in. Toukichirou is helping to get them in. Raimon started to dance but they aren't doing well. Then, Toukichirou gave Tenma a soccer ball and Tenma and the others started to play soccer. Wonderbot took his Mixi Max Gun and wanted to Mixi Max Shindou with Nobunaga but failed again. Raimon got arrested by that and Beta captured Wonderbot, telling others that they were villains intent on killing Nobunaga with the Mixi Max Gun.
15	"Special Training At Owari!"; Transliteration: "Owari de no tokubetsuna torēningu!" (Japanese: 尾張での特別なトレーニング！)	August 1, 2012
16	"Final Battle at the Fool's Festival!"; Transliteration: "Fūru-sai de fainarubatoru!" (Japanese: フール祭でファイナルバトル！)	August 15, 2012
17	"The Dream of Rule"; Transliteration: "Yume no tenga" (Japanese: 夢の天下)	August 22, 2012
18	"Everyone is back!" Transliteration: "Min'na ga kaettekita!" (Japanese: みんなが帰ってきた！)	August 29, 2012
19	"The Girl In The Armor"; Transliteration: "Yoroi no shōjo" (Japanese: 鎧の少女)	September 5, 2012
20	"Soccer in the Flames!"; Transliteration: "Honō no sakkā!" (Japanese: 炎のサッカー！)	September 12, 2012
21	"A Vow Upon This Flag"; Transliteration: "Chikai wa Kono Hata no motoni" (Japanese: 誓いはこの旗のもとに)	September 19, 2012
22	"Liu Bei Is Funny!"; Transliteration: "Ryūbi-san wa omoshiroi!" (Japanese: 劉備さんは面白い！)	October 3, 2012
23	"Surprise! Kongming's Fortress!"; Transliteration: "Gyōten! Kōmei no kan!!" (Japanese: 仰天！孔明の館！！)	October 10, 2012
24	"Fierce Attack! Zanark Domain!"; Transliteration: "Geki-kasane! Zanāku Domein!" (Japanese: 激襲！ザナーク・ドメイン！！)	October 17, 2012
25	"Explosion! Kongming's Power!"; Transliteration: "Sakuretsu! Kōmei no Chikara!" (Japanese: 炸裂！孔明の力！)	October 24, 2012
26	"Sakamoto Ryōma Arrives!"; Transliteration: "Sakamoto Ryōma! Tōjō!!" (Japanese: 坂本龍馬！登場！！)	October 31, 2012
27	"Swordsman Of The Late Edo Era! Okita Souji!"; Transliteration: "Bakumatsu no kenshi! Okita Sōji!!" (Japanese: 幕末の剣士！沖田総司！！)	November 7, 2012
28	"Soccer Battle! Sakamoto VS Okita!"; Transliteration: "Sakkā taiketsu! Sakamoto VS Okita!" (Japanese: サッカー対決！坂本VS沖田！！)	November 14, 2012
29	"The Men Who Create Eras"; Transliteration: "Jidai o Tsukuru Otokotachi" (Japanese: 時代を作る男たち)	November 14, 2012
30	"Legend of Endou Mamoru!"; Transliteration: "Endō Mamoru Densetsu!" (Japanese: 円堂守伝説！)	November 21, 2012
31	"To the Dinosaur Era We Go!"; Transliteration: "Kyōryū Jidai e GO!" (Japanese: 恐竜時代へGO！)	November 28, 2012
32	"Watch This! King of the Dinosaurs!"; Transliteration: "Mita ka! Kyōryū no ō!" (Japanese: 見たか！ 恐竜の王！)	December 5, 2012
33	"Big Showdown at Beast Valley!"; Transliteration: "Kemono no tani no daikessen!" (Japanese: 獣の谷の大決戦！)	December 12, 2012
34	"The Voice That Roars Goodbye"; Transliteration: "Sayonara to hoeru koe" (Japanese: さよならと吼える声)	December 19, 2012
35	"The Jump Into Legend!"; Transliteration: "Densetsu e no janpu!" (Japanese: 伝説へのジャンプ！)	December 26, 2012
36	"Assemble! Knights of The Round Table!!"; Transliteration: "Tsudoe! Entaku no kishi!!" (Japanese: 集え！円卓の騎士！！)	January 9, 2013
37	"King Arthur and Master Dragon!"; Transliteration: "Āsā-ō to masutā doragon!" (Japanese: アーサー王とマスタードラゴン！)	January 16, 2013
38	"Hyper Dive Mode of Fear!"; Transliteration: "Kyōfu no haipādaibumōdo!" (Japanese: 恐怖のハイパーダイブモード！)	January 23, 2013
39	"Union! Raimon and El Dorado!!"; Transliteration: "Kessoku! Kaminarimon to erudorado! !" (Japanese: 結束! 雷門とエルドラド!!)	January 30, 2013
40	"Grand Opening! The Final Battle, Ragnarok!!"; Transliteration: "Sōzetsu kaimaku! Saishū kessen ragunaroku! !" (Japanese: 壮絶開幕！最終決戦ラグナロク！！)	February 6, 2013
41	"Fei's Awakening!"; Transliteration: "Fei no me same" (Japanese: フェイの目醒め)	February 13, 2013
42	"The Eleventh Strongest Power in History!"; Transliteration: "11 Ninme no Jikuu Saikyou!" (Japanese: 11人目の時空最強！)	February 20, 2013
43	"Mecha Endou Appears!"; Transliteration: "Meka Endou Toujou!" (Japanese: メカ円堂登場！)	February 27, 2013
44	"Fei Is The Enemy?!"; Transliteration: "Fei ga teki?!" (Japanese: フェイが敵！？)	March 6, 2013
45	"Great Max Me!"; Transliteration: "Gurētomakkusuna ore!" (Japanese: グレートマックスなオレ！)	March 13, 2013
46	"Supporter X's Identity!"; Transliteration: "Shien-sha X no shōtai!" (Japanese: 支援者Xの正体！)	March 20, 2013
47	"All Assembled! The Strongest Eleven in History!!"; Transliteration: "Shuuketsu! Jikō saikyō irebun!!" (Japanese: 集結！時空最強イレブン！！)	April 3, 2013
48	"Saru's Power!"; Transliteration: "Saru no chikara!" (Japanese: SARUの力！)	April 10, 2013
49	"Beastly Attack! Second Stage Children!!"; Transliteration: "Mōkō! Sekandosutēji chirudoren!!" (Japanese: 猛攻！セカンドステージ・チルドレン！！)	April 17, 2013
50	"The Last Time Jump!"; Transliteration: "Saigo no taimu janpu!" (Japanese: 最後のタイムジャンプ！)	April 24, 2013
51	"Soccer Is Back!"; Transliteration: "Sakkā ga kaettekita!" (Japanese: サッカーが帰ってきた！)	May 1, 2013

== Reception ==
The Inazuma Eleven GO: Chrono Stone anime won the best title in the 34th Animage Grand Prix.
