= Inazuma Eleven GO season 1 =

Inazuma Eleven GO
- Season 1
- First Japanese DVD compilation of Inazuma Eleven GO with 2 extra special episodes
- No. of episodes: 47

Release
- Original network: TV Tokyo
- Original release: May 4, 2011 – April 11, 2012

Series chronology
- ← Previous; Season 3 Next → GO: Chrono Stone

Inazuma Eleven GO (イナズマイレブン GO, Inazuma Irebun GO; lit. Lightning Eleven GO) is the first season of the Japanese anime television series Inazuma Eleven GO. It is based on Level-5's video game of the same name. The season consisted of 47 episodes.

The season aired on TV Tokyo from May 14, 2011, to April 11, 2012. The season was produced by Level-5 in conjunction with TV Tokyo, Dentsu, and OLM.

10 years after the FFI, an unnoticed darkness lurks behind the country. Japan and what used to be soccer has changed during the 10 years that have passed. In this time, soccer is different from before and has become a reason for people to lose hope and stop playing for those who enjoy soccer. The new main protagonist, Matsukaze Tenma tries out for the Raimon soccer team and passes but in a match with another team, he soon realizes that soccer is much different from what he has expected it to be. Now, soccer in Japan is controlled by an organization called Fifth Sector and is led by the one known as the "Holy Emperor", namely Ishido Shuuji (who is later revealed to be Gouenji Shuuya). Soccer in its current state is controlled and gives out commands whether the team loses purposely or wins the match. What used to be the "real soccer" is gone.

== Summary ==
Matsukaze Tenma, along with the members of the Raimon team, now aim to free soccer so that everyone can finally play soccer freely without being ordered how to do it.

The rebellion starts against the Fifth Sector. The Raimon team receives unexpected help from the Resistance organization that aims to replace the Holy Emperor and from the previous main characters of the Inazuma Eleven anime.

== Theme Songs ==
Opening songs

1. Ten Made Todoke! (eps 1-18), by T-Pistonz+KMC
2. Naseba Naru no sa Nanairo Tamago (eps 19-33), by T-Pistonz+KMC
3. Ohayou! Shining Day (eps 34-45), by T-Pistonz+KMC
4. Uchi Kudaku! (eps 46-47), by T-Pistonz+KMC

Ending songs

1. Yappa Seishun (eps 1-18), by Sorano Aoi (CV: Kitahara Sayaka)
2. Kanari Junjou (eps 19-33), by Sorano Aoi (CV: Kitahara Sayaka)
3. Hajike-Yo!! (eps 34-45), by Sorano Aoi (CV: Kitahara Sayaka)
4. Ohayou! Shining Day (eps 46-47), by T-Pistonz+KMC

== Episode list ==
No.	English title (Translated title)	Original release date
1	"A New Wind Blows Through Raimon!/A Fresh Breeze At Raimon High"; Transliteration: "Raimon ni fuku atarashī kaze!" (Japanese: 雷門に吹く新しい風！)	May 4, 2011
Arion Sherwind lives for Football, so there's only one place for him: Raimon Junior High -- the school that won the world title ten years ago. On his first morning at Raimon, Arion is so excited that he skips the opening ceremony and rushes to check out the action on the Football pitch, but there he finds the team's members fallen and battered. A mysterious boy is standing among them. "Raimon Football is dead," he says, "Who needs Football, anyway?" Arion finds himself challenging the boy for the future of the team, but he's no match for the skill and power of this mysterious stranger...
2	"This is an Avatar!/The Elusive Fighting Spirit " Transliteration: "Kore ga Keshin da!" (Japanese: これが化身(けしん)だ!)	May 11, 2011
When Arion manages to steal the ball from the mysterious Victor Blade, Victor aims a furious shot at him. But that ball is suddenly knocked off course by another from Riccardo Di Rigo, captain of the Raimon team, who stands together with the varsity Raimon Eleven. Victor smirks and declares that he and his Order of Black Templars, sent by an organization called Fifth Sector, will be the new Raimon Eleven, and a Football battle ensues over the right to bear that name. The Order of Black Templars' onslaught is relentless, with Victor Blade using his Special moves to score over and over again. Raimon seems doomed when suddenly Coach Percival makes the stunning decision to send the newcomer, Arion, into the match...
3	"Collapse! Raimon Soccer Club!!/The Fall of The Raimon Football Team"; Transliteration: "Hōkai! Raimon Sakkā-bu!!" (Japanese: 崩壊! 雷門サッカー部!!)	May 18, 2011
There is a legend in Football that a skilled player's energy, when it's in perfect focus, can take visible form -- a "Fighting Spirits." The legend proves true when Victor Blade reveals his own Fighting Spirits. But Riccardo, pushed to the limit, inspired by Arion, and determined to save the Raimon Football tradition, summons his own fighting spirit and blocks Victor's unblockable shot. Victor and Riccardo prepare to clash when the game is suddenly declared over. The Order of Black Templars depart, vowing to return again, leaving the Raimon Football team in shambles. With Fifth Sector looming over them, many members quit, yet Arion still wants to join. What will Riccardo do?
4	"Tenma's Club Entrance Test!"; Transliteration: "Tenma no Nyūbu Tesuto!/ Can Arion Make the Grade?" (Japanese: 天馬の入部テスト!)	May 25, 2011
Out of nowhere, Victor is given a spot on the Raimon Football team without undergoing tryouts, and the team is not happy. The upperclassmen entrusted Riccardo with the job of team captain, but how can he protect the Raimon Football club in a world where Fifth Sector decides the outcome of every game? Arion and J.P. wake up early to prepare for their tryouts, but get so caught up in training that they show up late! Many different emotions well up in the older members as they watch the two boys train relentlessly, refusing to waste time even to enjoy recess or eat lunch. Victor is among them, but when Arion plainly states his desire to make the team, Victor says only, "Do whatever you like."
5	"The Fixed Match"; Transliteration: "Shikumareta Shiai" (Japanese: 仕組まれた試合)	June 1, 2011
The episode started off with Tenma waking up in the morning and said that he was excited about the soccer club. When the classes ended, Tenma, Shinsuke and Aoi ran off to the club room but there was nobody yet. When everyone came, they bowed and greeted them. When everyone was in the soccer club, the new members introduced themselves and the already soccer members introduced them too to the new members. After that, Otonashi gave Tenma and Shinsuke their soccer uniform in which Tenma said that those were the first team uniforms. Kirino Ranmaru answered that the whole second team left and some of the first team too, so there was no point of joining the second team. After that, they go and practice soccer in the field. Shindou got mad about Tsurugi's attitude and actions. Then, Megane received a phone call from Coach Kudou while he is playing on his computer. After, there was a team meeting in the club room. It is revealed that the phone call was a challenge from the team Eito, and the result of the match was fixed. Raimon has to lose by 3-0. Then when Shindou was heading home, a mother of one of the teammates of Eito called to him and gave him a ticket as a bribe and left. Shindou was holding the ticket angrily. The next day, the match begins, and Eito scores the first goal but Sangoku could have stopped it with his hissatsu. As the team was pretending to be not strong against Eito Gakuen. Tenma cannot believe what he is seeing. At the end, there is a mysterious man who is at the stadium watching. He, himself also cannot believe what is happening.
6	"The Feelings Poured into the Last Pass"; Transliteration: "Rasuto Pasu ni Kometa Omoi" (Japanese: ラストパスにこめた思い)	June 8, 2011
Eito scored 2-0. Tenma could not understand what was happening to the team since during their practice. They were really good at shooting.The second half begins and Eito already has 3 points. Tenma has learned that his team might be disbanded if they don't listen to orders from Fifth Sector, and with everyone else seeming to be really bummed out, Tenma can't catch the ball. A while later, he has seemed to get back his spirit, and steal the ball from Eito. He passes it to Shindou, but no matter how many times he passes it, Shindou doesn't want to catch the ball from Tenma. Finally Shindou answers to Tenma's feelings towards soccer in this match and unconsciously shoots the ball scoring a goal. The match ends up with 1-3 score. After the match Tenma wasn't even bothered about consequences of his actions during the match. The school principal finds it enough to be the reason to fire Kudou. After leaving Raimon we can see Kudou making a call to Megane asking him to proceed as they planned. After the game, Shindou received a call from Sangoku that the coach was fired. Shindou ran coming to him. Kudou was leaving them as their coach. But before Kudou left, he asked what was the feeling Shindou felt when he scored to which Shindou just kept silent about, Kudou stated that he should not forget what was the feeling. Now, the Raimon soccer club has no more coach. What will happen now?
7	"Coach Endou Makes His Appearance!/Enter Coach Evans!"; Transliteration: "Endō Kantoku Tōjō!!" (Japanese: 円堂(えんどう)監督登場!!)	June 15, 2011
Percival Travis is fired for defying the orders of Fifth Sector. He leaves Raimon, telling Arion to keep fighting the good fight. Meanwhile, Riccardo, devastated by the loss of the coach he trusted, goes into seclusion. The entire team is feeling low as they meet their new coach: none other than the legendary Mark Evans! When Coach Evans announces they are going to "practice to win", the players are suspicious. Is this really the coach sent by Fifth Sector? Coach Evans tells the team to meet him at the old pitch by the river, but only Arion and J.P. show up...
8	"Qualifications of a Captain"; Transliteration: "Kyaputen no Shikaku" (Japanese: キャプテンの資格)	June 22, 2011
The episode starts off with last year's final match in Holy Road versus Kidokawa Seishuu. Raimon's opponent was leading in the second half by two goals. But thanks to Shindou and his Fortissimo shoot, Raimon scores a goal. The match ends with a score of 2-1. Kidokawa Seishuu wins this match and becomes the champion of the Nationals. It is shown that Tenma, Shinsuke, and Sorano were watching this match from the soccer club. Haruna came in and turned off the TV after seeing the game. A while later, Endou came in holding a poster -- a poster for Holy Road, a soccer tournament. He posted the poster in the club room. So then, a few moments later, the team practiced out on the field. Then, Endou was called into the principal's office where he was told to lose their first match in Holy Road tournament without making a single goal (an order from Fifth Sector). Endou pretended to agree with it. But after he closed the door and saw Haruna waiting for him outside, he told her that he has another point and is not going to tell the team about it. When Tenma discovered that Shindou was quitting the soccer team, he was tried to find Shindou. He was then called by Shinsuke to come up to the roof top about something Kirino, Shindou, and Sangoku were talking about. Shindou was talking about quitting the team. He told it to Endou. The whole team was talking about it, and when Seto heard that Hamano, Hayami and Kurama being negative about it, she got high tempered again. She almost punches Hayami but Akane stopped her in time, telling her not to use any violence. Tenma couldn't accept what was happening, so he tried to convince Shindou to come back and goes to Shindou's house. Tenma asked if Shindou wanted to train at the riverbank with him along with Shinsuke. At the riverbank, Shindou used Fortissimo and wanted to leave shortly after but Tenma said that he still wanted to play true soccer. That made Shindou mad and Shindou took the ball of Tenma. Shortly after Tenma revealed his new hissatsu, Soyokaze Step against Shindou, Endou was revealed to be watching. When Tenma said that he will use it in the Holy Road, Shindou was seen crying and said that he doesn't deserve to be the captain but Endou cheered Shindou up, telling him that tears made him a captain. Shindou finally agreed to return to the team and accept the captain mark. The next morning, Tsurugi warned him about the next match and Fifth Sector's order to lose it without scoring a single goal.
9	"The Curtain Rises At Last! Holy Road!!"; Transliteration: "Tsui ni Kaimaku! Hōrī Rōdo!!" (Japanese: ついに開幕! ホーリーロード!!)	June 29, 2011
Endou suggested to the Raimon team to take part in the Holy Road tournament but seems very troubled at the idea of taking part in the Holy Road. Matsukaze Tenma gets a chance to spend some time with Sangoku Taichi and receives some advice from him. At night, Tenma trained again with Nishizono Shinsuke at Kasenjiki. In the next day, they finally have their match against Tengawara and start the kickoff to the first half of the match against Tengawara. Raimon have to lose 2-0. But when Kita Ichiban shot to Raimon's goal, Shindou stopped it and said that he won't follow Fifth Sector's command. Afterwards Shindou used Kami no Takuto and was able to score a goal against Tengawara using his Fortissimo, leading the point 1-0.
10	"Rebellion for Victory!/ A Rebellion For Victory!"; Transliteration: "Shōri e no Hanran!" (Japanese: 勝利への反乱!)	July 6, 2011
The first regional round of the Saints Way tournament is underway. In defiance of Fifth Sector's orders, Riccardo scores the first goal against Milky Way Charter School and vows that Raimon will win the match -- but the other players refuse to follow his lead, afraid of the possible consequences. Milky Way Charter School takes control of the game by playing rough, and though Arion and a few others fight back with everything they've got, Milky Way Charter School midfielder Zaphod Riker uses his fighting spirits to even the score. Zaphod Riker mocks Riccardo for not being able to control his own fighting spirits, but when he tells Sam, "A loser like you could never block my shot"...
11	"Tsurugi's Secret"; Transliteration: "Tsurugi no Himitsu" (Japanese: 剣城の秘密)	July 13, 2011
At the start of the episode, Tenma has a flashback about their last game they played. Then, Shinsuke appeared and they both raced to school together. When they arrived at the club room, some of the members looked depressed, others mad. On the other hand, Endou was called in the principal's office and, sort of, had a fight, or so. Afterwards, Tsurugi was waiting outside for the outcome. In the hospital, Tsurugi visited his injured elder brother, Tsurugi Yuuichi. They both went outside and talked about their childhood. Then, he had a flashback. The both of them were playing soccer, and pretending to be Gouenji, but in the process, his elder brother got hurt in an accident to save Tsurugi and had been in a wheelchair ever since. Moments later, he saw his former coach and they went to the secret lair of Ishido Shuuji together to talk with him. At the field, the team was playing and Akane kept on taking pictures. Tsurugi arrived and asked if he can join the next game. Endou recklessly accepted and the others were afraid and nervous about it. Tenma protested and said some words of encouragement, but one of the members got mad of that. Then, Minamisawa suddenly resigned from the team, and Kurama angrily blamed it on Tenma. Shindou, before leaving approached coach Endou, outside of the old soccer club room. Endou encouraged Shindou not to be afraid of Tsurugi nor get mad at him. At the streets, Tenma saw Tsurugi and tried to talk to him and tried to explain to him the real importance of soccer. He got home and Aki and Tenma talked to each other, heart-to-heart about things people his age don't understand. Game day arrives, Tsurugi replaces Minamisawa. The others are worried about it because of his attitude. The captain of the opponent spoke to Tsurugi about Fifth Sector and Tsurugi flinched. The game started, Tsurugi immediately got the ball, and then he kicked it to Raimon's goal and scored for Mannouzaka, just like Fifth Sector's order. Tsurugi said to Raimon's members that he will destroy Raimon.
12	"The Avatar's Miracle! Mannōzaka Jr. High!!"; Transliteration: "Keshin no Kyōi! Mannō-zaka-chū!!" (Japanese: 化身の驚異! 万能坂中!!)	July 20, 2011
Tsurugi scored an own goal to follow Fifth Sector's order for Raimon to lose, 1-0. Mannouzaka starts playing very violently, much like Kuro no Kishidan's playing style with Raimon and injured all of the players. Kirino was badly injured after he tried was sliding tackled by Shirato Kiyoshirou and couldn't stand up again, in which the managers were worried about him. Tenma opposes their playing style and following orders from Fifth Sector, but is hit badly. Tenma was hit again and again, and barely avoids a slide on the foot, but was saved by Tsurugi. Tsurugi realized that if Tenma didn't dodge that, there would have been a serious injury on his foot. He told that to the attacker, Mannouzaka's captain, Isozaki Kenma. But he said he doesn't care, and Tenma might as well have a permanent injury. Then, remembering his brother's injury, Tsurugi used Death Sword to score a point for Raimon, making the score 1-1.Aoi said that Tenma was injured a bit but he could still play and took care of Tenma's foot. At the other side, Shindou said that Kirino couldn't play at all because his foot was injured badly and apologized for it in which Kirino said that it wasn't his fault at all and wished him good luck in the second half. Kurumada came to Shindou and said that he won't play in the second half along with Amagi, Hamano, Hayami and Kurama in which Kirino was shocked but Shindou said that it was okay and that he didn't want that they will be involved too by disobeying the Fifth Sectors orders. As the second half started, Mannouzaka was surprised that there was only ten members on the field and five of them, were at the field side, not playing at all. After the kick off, Tsurugi stole the ball and tried to score again with his Death Sword but it was stopped by Mannouzaka goalkeeper Shinoyama Mitsuru's keshin, Kikai Hei Galleus. He then passed the ball to the forward, Mitsuyoshi Yozakura, who used his keshin, Kijutsuma Purim, to score using the Magician's Box shoot hissatsu. Sangoku tried to stop the ball using Burning Catch but failed. The ball made its way into the goal, making the score 2-1 in favor of Mannouzaka.
13	"Raimon's Awakening!?"; Transliteration: "Raimon no Kakusei!?" (Japanese: 雷門の覚醒!?)	July 27, 2011
The episode starts off with the continuation of the game of Raimon vs. Mannouzaka as of the previous episode. Tsurugi takes the ball from Shinsuke and heads to the goal. Then he is surrounded, and tried to break through but failed. Then Shindou told him that if he really wants to win, work with them. Tsurugi finally passed the ball to Shindou. He passes the ball to Tenma but only for the ball to be stolen by Mannouzaka. Raimon surrounds them, but the ball is passed to another player. He shoots, and Sangoku's Burning Catch wasn't able to catch it barely missing a point as it bounces off the top of the net. Mannouzaka keeps attacking Sangoku, gradually wearing him down. After seeing this, Seto stood up, and shouted angrily to the rest of Raimon's members. She asked if they would feel anything after seeing their teammates trying their best to protect their soccer like that. Then, Mitsuyoshi Yozakura attempts to shoot using his keshin, as a final blow. It seems dim, but then, thanks to Seto's words, Kurumada steals the ball using his hissatsu, Dash Train. The rest of the team joins in, except for Kurama. Then, due to a rebound, the ball rolls to Kurama's feet. Encouraged by the other teammates, he finally passes the ball to Tsurugi, who manages scores a point using his keshin hissatsu, Lost Angel. A while later, Shindou uses his hissatsu, Fortissimo, to score the last point. Shinoyama has used up all his energy and is unable to use his keshin, allowing Raimon to win by 3-2.
14	"Shinsuke's Special Technique!"; Transliteration: "Shinsuke no Hissatsu-waza!" (Japanese: 信助の必殺技!)	August 3, 2011
The episode starts with Shinsuke and Aoi leaving Tenma's house determined that now they can surely win Holy Road Tournament. The next day Tenma finds Shinsuke training at the riverbank. After hearing Shinsuke's determination, Tenma became very excited, and offered to help him. Then they went to the morning training and apologized for coming late. All the members get fired up because Shinsuke wanted to learn a new hissatsu technique, and named it "Buttobi Jump". Later that day Kirino and Shindou are discussing their possibilities at Holy Road, while Hayami and Hamano discussing the same. At the riverbank Tenma and Shinsuke practice Sangoku, Amagi, and Kuramada offer to help Shinsuke practice but all the tries failed. Aki came with Aoi to give them some food, then she gave some advice to Shinsuke. Finally he was able to master Buttobi Jump. With a regained confidence they decide to win the Holy Road Tournament.
15	"Reunion with Kidō Yūto"; Transliteration: "Kidō Yūto to no Saikai" (Japanese: 鬼道有人との再会)	August 10, 2011
The episode starts off with Ishido Shuuji and another person in the Fifth Sector headquarters talking about the upcoming Kanto Region Holy Road match. This scene lasts until the opening starts.After that, they show Endou telling the Raimon team that Teikoku is their next opponent to which everyone is shocked. The next opponent was supposed to be Aoba. Matsukaze is pumped up for the next match. Shindou suggests a new hissatsu tactic for the match against Teikoku. Next Raimon goes off to practice, to which Shindou talks about the hissatsu tactic. Kirino, Sangoku, Hamano, Amagi, and Hayami help Shindou out with the tactic, only to see that it failed. After that, Shindou still tries and thinks what was missing. Kurama also tries, but he also fails. Later it shows Tsurugi watching over his older brother at the hospital while his brother is sleeping. Tsurugi has a flashback by looking at a magazine his brother was reading about the Holy Emperor talking about their past agreement. After that moment, Teikoku is seen along with Sakuma and Kidou watching them train. Kidou then arrives, giving the team a briefing about the next match. Once the briefing is over, Sakuma resumes their training, and Kidou walks off, sending a text message to Endou.Later Kidou was seen overlooking Inazuma Town on near the Inazuma Steel Plaza, and Endou with Haruna comes over to meet him. They have a long conversation, with Endou and Haruna being very shocked over Kidou's personality and trying to convince him but Kidou's mind would not change and leaves afterwards.The next day, Matsukaze goes off to find Tsurugi, and he asks where Tsurugi is to the managers and before they finish what they were about to tell, he dashed off. Matsukaze goes to room no. 315 to see Tsurugi talking to his older brother. Tenma interrupts the conversation and talks to Tsurugi for a while, only for Tsurugi to end it off.After returning, Matsukaze talks to Endou about what happened with Tsurugi but Endou encourages and lightens up the mood of Tenma by showing him what the Raimon team has been practicing, they were calling it Ultimate Thunder.Then came the next day, the day of the match. Whereas, Ichino Nanasuke and Aoyama Shunsuke came to watch the match. The match starts, though most of the members of the Teikoku team are relaxed though the captain of Teikoku told them to be sharp and the Raimon team is worried since they are missing one member and they haven't finished Ultimate Thunder, especially Hayami, though Tenma encouraged them though Kurumada said that the match won't be easy since Teikoku is strong.After sometime, it could be seen that Endou and Haruna and talking while Kidou, from afar stated that he will look forward to this match.
16	"Terrifying! Teikoku Academy!!"; Transliteration: "Senritsu! Teikoku Gakuen!!" (Japanese: 戦慄!帝国学園!!)	August 17, 2011
The Raimon team started the match against Teikoku but it seems impossible. Shindou's Fortissimo was blocked by the goalkeeper even without using a hissatsu. They tried out their incomplete hissatsu tactic, Ultimate Thunder, but it failed in the end. Afterwards, Shinsuke was having doubts on using his Buttobi Jump but after some encouragement by their coach Endou, he got back on his spirit and gave the ball to the team and afterward they tried out the hissatsu tactic again and this time, after Kurama being determined on how the team was persevering, he helped out in this hissatsu tactic and it seems that it was almost perfected, the only problem was that one of the Teikoku Gakuen defenders, Ryuuzaki Ouji used his keshin, Ryuukishi Tedis and they weren't able to use the hissatsu tactic.Then at the hospital, Tsurugi's old coach, Kuroki Zenzou, came and talked to him about his brother, that if Raimon loses, his brother will be cured to which his older brother heard from afar and could not believe what he just heard. Tsurugi now has to choose, his brother or Raimon.At the end of the episode, Teikoku's captain, Mikado Haruma, used his shoot hissatsu, Koutei Penguin 7 and broke through Sangoku's Burning Catch, making Teikoku lead 1-0.
17	"Explosion! Ultimate Thunder!!"; Transliteration: "Sakuretsu! Arutimetto Sandā!!" (Japanese: 炸裂!アルティメットサンダー!!)	August 24, 2011
The episode started with Tsurugi still having a problem if he would help Raimon. The start of the episode showed also what recently happened during Episode 16. After that, the team was shown to be trying their best to win and shoot a goal in the first half but nonetheless was stopped by Teikoku through hissatsu moves like Sargasso and Britannia Cross as shown when they took the ball from Kurama and Hayami. Afterwards, Mikado used his keshin to score a goal and Sangoku used Burning Catch to block it but he failed to catch Mikado's shoot. The score was currently 0-2, since during Episode 16, Mikado scored a goal because of his hissatsu, Koutei Penguin 7.Then at the hospital where Tsurugi's brother is confined, the brothers had a serious talk since Tsurugi Yuuichi was able to overhear what his younger brother, Tsurugi Kyousuke discussed with his old coach about making Raimon lose. After that, Yuuichi cries a bit to which Kyousuke felt a bit guilty. Kyousuke went outside and thought a bit.Back to the game, the first half ended and everyone was troubled that they could not defeat Teikoku. Though suddenly Tsurugi Kyousuke appears and states that he will help out the team to which Kurama stated that they cannot trust Tsurugi to which Matsukaze said that they could trust Tsurugi and so the whole team also agreed.The team tries Ultimate Thunder with Tsurugi this time, though the first two turns where unsuccessful because he was still worried about his older brother, Yuuichi, though after Matsukaze's words rang Tsurugi up. Tsurugi tried Ultimate Thunder for the third time and had a flashback of his older brother passing him the ball but he could not catch it. Both of them had fun playing soccer.After his determination came back, Tsurugi was finally able to complete Ultimate Thunder and after that everyone was happy to see Ultimate Thunder work. After that, Matsukaze picked up the ball and uses Mach Wind to score a goal against Teikoku to which the goalkeeper of Teikoku used his hissatsu Power Spike but it wasn't able to catch Matsukaze's strong shoot hissatsu. Thus making the score 1-2. Afterwards, Mikado and Shindou used their Keshin and Shindou was able to break through Mikado's keshin. After that, it was Nishizono who unexpectedly scores a goal against Teikoku with Buttobi Jump. And finally the match ends with Tsurugi getting the third goal against Teikoku with Death Drop. It can be seen that his older brother, Yuuichi, happy for Kyousuke that he was able to play "real" soccer.Near the end of the episode, Endou can be seen asking Kidou the same question during Episode 15 about why did he became the coach of Teikoku and was he affiliated with Fifth Sector.
18	"Raise the Wind of Revolution!"; Transliteration: "Kaze o Okose!" (Japanese: 革命を起こせ!)	August 31, 2011
In this episode, Kidou and all the other people at Teikoku Gakuen were revealed to be part of a "resistance", secretly fighting against Fifth Sector. This group also included Coach Kudou, and returning characters like Hibiki Seigou (who seems to be their leader) and Raimon Souichirou, the former Chief Director of Raimon, Hirai Shinzou and also Endou Natsumi. Former Raimon players Ichino and Aoyama seemed to still care deeply about the team, especially since they can now play "Real soccer". Later on, they were seen enjoying soccer, which Shindou witnessed.
19	"The Raging Fangs of Kaiō!"; Transliteration: "Arekuruu Kaiō no Kiba!" (Japanese: 荒れ狂う海王の牙!)	September 7, 2011
The episode starts with Raimon visiting the Resistance again. Afterwards, the Raimon team goes training. Tenma is trying to learn a defense hissatsu and Tsurugi is helping him because he thinks that Tenma revealed some Keshin aura and Tsurugi wants to release his Keshin. The only problem is that Hayami is troubled about the match and started being negative again, although it was affecting his practice and skills. Ichino and Aoyama were watching Raimon practice. When Shindou noticed them, they walked away. In the break of the training, Raimon heard of coach Endou that the members of Kaiou are all SEEDs. Hamano was talking to the team and everyone wanted to train harder for their match. Hayami was still being depressed and didn't want to train with the rest, so he went fishing.Near the end of the day, Ichino and Aoyama were thinking whether to go back to Raimon or not. Hayami was still discouraged and worried until the end of the day. Tenma also asked if he was going to quit the soccer club. Hayami answered that if he had the courage, he already left the soccer club.The morning before the match, Ichino and Aoyama appeared and wanted to be back on the team. Shindou agreed and said that he was waiting for them and that they can go back to the team but the other members don't know if they accept Ichino and Aoyama. Shindou said that how many people are joining us, the revolution will stir up. The others later agreed with it and they went to the stadium. In the match against Kaiou, the match started with the opposite team getting a point because of the hissatsu technique, Flying Fish and because of that, Hayami became more discouraged.
20	"Take Flight! Tenma's Avatar!!"; Transliteration: "Habatake! Tenma no Keshin!!" (Japanese: 羽ばたけ!天馬の化身!!)	September 14, 2011
The episode starts with Yoshimine scoring a goal with Flying Fish.Then Raimon trying to score a goal with Kurama´s hissatsu, Sidewinder but fails due to Fukami's hissatsu, Hydro Anchor. In a chain of passes the ball finally gets to Yoshimine, but Tenma stops him with his new technique Spiral Draw and passes to Tsurugi so that he can score a goal with his Death Drop. Tsurugi defeated the keeper and scored a goal for Raimon. Then Namikawa reminds Kaiou that all of them are SEEDs and to have a SEED's pride and to crush Raimon, so Kaiou begins to assault Raimon with their Keshin and Hissatsu shoot thus scoring a goal with Namikawa's keshin, Kaiou Poseidon, and then again with Yoshimine´s Flying Fish. The first half ends, Raimon was behind by 3 points.At the halftime break Endou gives orders that Tenma will become the goalkeeper and Tsurugi suspects what he is going to do while everyone else in the team is shocked. At the beginning of the second half Kaiou's still in possession of the ball. They manages to break Raimon´s defense and Wanda shoots against the goal with his keshin, Onsoku no Varius, and Tenma is scared, but Tsurugi encourages him and manages to bring his Keshin out, stopping the goal.Then, Endou switches back Sangoku to the goal and Raimon begins to change the game by scoring goals to goals, even Hayami has created a new hissatsu for himself: Zeroyon. Kaiou's members are very surprised. Namikawa tells them that they´re SEEDs and that no one can beat them and passes to Wanda so he shoots again, but this time Sangoku stops it with his new hissatsu, Fence of Gaia. He passes to Tenma who manages to beat Kaiou Poseidon and then Seiei Hei Pawn W with his Keshin, Majin Pegasus. Finally, he passes to Shinsuke, and Shinsuke uses Buttobi Jump to score the final goal. At the end, Raimon manages to win and passing to the Holy Road´s Nationals. They beat Kaiou at the scored of 4-3.
21	"The Akizora Challengers!"; Transliteration: "Akizora no Chōsen-sha!" (Japanese: 秋空の挑戦者!)	September 21, 2011
A new student at Raimon Jr. High joins Raimon 's soccer club. He's a decent player, as shown in his entrance exam, but he seems to "give off a scary aura"... Furthermore, Kogure Yuuya makes his reappearance, as the captain of the Akizora Challengers. With the new addition on the team of Raimon, they have a match. What will go on in this game?
22	"Assemble! At the Flag of Revolution!"; Transliteration: "Tsudoe! Kakumei no Hata ni!" (Japanese: 集え!革命の旗に!)	September 28, 2011
The episode starts with Kariya Masaki going to Raimon yet again, where he encounters Kirino Ranmaru along the way. Kirino asks Kariya what his true intentions are and why he tackled him, to which Kariya was just answering with a sly smile. Kirino states that he might be a SEED to which Kariya was about to answer until Tenma and the others arrived. Seto Midori asks what Kirino and Kariya were talking about to which Kariya lied. Afterwards, Kirino approached Tsurugi Kyousuke to ask whether Kariya is a SEED or not since Tsurugi himself was a SEED. However, Tsurugi responded sadly that he did not know whether Kariya was a SEED or not.Tenma and Nishizono Shinsuke approached Kariya later and asked what he and Kirino were talking about, to which Kariya deceived them both again with a friendly and wondering voice, stating that "Kirino-senpai thought I was a SEED", to which Matsukaze and Shinsuke were surprised, and they were even more surprised when Kariya asked them what a SEED was. They answered and Kariya understood. Kariya asked Matsukaze whether he thought he was a SEED or not. The latter stated that Kariya was their teammate and that he would trust Kariya, to which Kariya looked away for momentarily, feeling guilty.Later, during a practice, he made Kirino look bad by pretending to be injured and saying that Kirino got the ball from him too violently, causing Kirino and Kariya to detest each other even more.The next day, Ichino Nanasuke and Aoyama Shunsuke were talking about their upcoming match in the bus and were advised by Kidou Yuuto. Then the whole Raimon team went to the Amano Mikado Stadium.One day later, they were going to the next stadium to which they're match will be held, and they saw Minamisawa Atsuishi on the opposing team, surprising them. Both teams spoke, and Sangoku Taichi, Kurumada Gouichi and the others were getting angry but were held off by the captain of the other team. After they arrived, the two teams walked into the stadium, and Raimon was surprised to see that it was the Cyclone Stadium. The match starts with Kurama but he was sent to the air up high by the typhoons. The Raimon team was having a hard time but Matsukaze Tenma was able to successfully use his hissatsu, Soyokaze Step, to avoid the whirlwinds. Kurama then tried using his shoot hissatsu, Sidewinder, but failed since it was stopped by Hyoudou's keshin Kyoshin Gigantes and his hissatsu Gigantic Bomb.Minamisawa tried to shoot with Sonic Shot but was blocked by Sangoku Taichi's Fence of Gaia catch hissatsu, though the second shot went through with some help from Kariya. One of the members of the opposing team thanked Kariya, which led to Kirino suspecting that he really is a SEED.At the end, Kariya made a sly smile and said that he was indeed a SEED (a spy), angering Kirino further.
23	"Terryfying Cyclone Stadium!"; Transliteration: "Kyōfu no Saikuron Sutajiamu!" (Japanese: 恐怖のサイクロンスタジアム！)	October 10, 2011
The episode starts with the score shown to be 0-1, in favor of Gassan Kunimitsu as well as Kariya returning to his post to which Kirino remembered what Kariya said in the end of the first half, that Kariya joked that he was actually a SEED to which made Kirino angry at Kariya. It is shown that Minamisawa goes back to his position and he showed an angry look when he passed by Tenma while he was returning to his position to which Tenma noticed this. Sangoku apologizes to his team members that he wasn't able to catch the ball, to which Shindou encouraged him not to let the goal let him down. Then, Kariya tell lies to Amagi stating that Kirino said about how Amagi can't defend the ball and made Kirino to always cover for him. This led to Amagi approaching Kirino angry and mad at him. Kirino knew that Kariya lied again to make him look bad to which Kirino got angry and wanted to approach Kariya, Shindou stopped Kirino and said that it not like him. Their coach, Endou noticed that. Tenma was going back to his position when Tsurugi ask him what he thought about Kariya and Tenma ask Tsurugi what does he mean, after that Tsurugi came back to his position. Tenma looked over at Kariya who was exercising his legs.Afterwards, the first half starts again, Tsurugi passes the ball to Kurama. Kurama passed it to Shindou. The coach of Gassan Kunimitsu signaled the captain of the team and the captain gave out orders to get ready. Then, the turbines created three whirlwinds this time that blocked Shindou's path, so he passed it to Matsukaze Tenma. Tenma passed through the whirlwind using his dribble hissatsu; Soyokaze Step. Then, there were two opponents that were trying to get the ball from Tenma, but it was actually a lure to make the ball get to the newly formed whirlwind. The coach of Raimon; Endou and the coach assistant; Kidou talked about the whirlwinds in the field for a while.Back in the field, the ball is in now the possession of the Gassan Kunimitsu and used a dribble hissatsu; Claymore, to get past Hamano. Since the opponent was getting close to the goal, Kirino was pacing to get the ball though, Amagi did not want Kirino to get it since he was angry at Kirino because of the lie Kariya said to him. Endou and Kidou saw this act again and talked about it. Then it is shown that the opponent team's coach, checked where the whirlwinds will be this time. Because of the whirlwind and the defenders of Raimon being marked, they had a hard time, though Kariya saw an opening and got the ball from the opponent. Kidou asked Shinsuke, that was at the bench to get ready. And the whistle sounds and it's the end of the first half.Kidou Yuuto explains the position for the second half, exchanging Kurumada Gouichi with Nishizono Shinsuke. Then, Endou states that Kirino will be benched which Kirino was surprised but was left with no choice. Shindou asked who will replace him, to which Ichino and Aoyama get nervous since one of them might replace Kirino to which Endou states no one will replace him in the field, leaving the match with Raimon with only ten members to which everyone was surprised. Kirino then talks with their coach and this is seen by Tenma. Tenma then talks to Kirino about him thinking that Kariya was a SEED, Kirino explains to Tenma and Kirino looks angrily at Kariya who was smiling with a sly smile.Then at Gassan Kunimitsu's bench, while their coach explains their position, Minamisawa is shown to be looking afar at Raimon with a glance with his eyes that are a bit shaky.At the second half, at the start, Kariya uses Hunter's Net to get the ball from the opponent, he then passes the ball to Amagi, then kicks the ball up high and passes it to Shinsuke and heads the ball back to Kariya. Kirino is watching the match closely at the bench. Then there was a whirlwind approaching the near Kariya, though he did the unexpected, he kicked the ball toward the whirlwind and said "this tornado is the eleventh Raimon player". Kirino was surprised of what he said. Then Tenma get the ball to which Tenma starts running and used his hissatsu: Spiral Draw to get the ball which he was able to get. Then, Tenma used his shoot hissatsu: Mach Wind, then Hyoudou called out his keshin, Kyoshin Gigantes, though in his surprise, Kurama comes and uses his shoot hissatsu; Sidewinder, creating a powerful chain shoot hissatsu, which was too fast to be caught by the keshin. Raimon is now equal, having a score of 1-1. Tenma then talks to Kariya that he did amazing defense, Tenma then also states about soccer, then the captain of the Raimon team: Shindou that both of them should return to their position. Kariya then wonders about what Tenma said.The match starts again, where Gassan Kunimitsu used a tactic called Tactics Cycle. It was able to get past Raimon easily, Kariya is shown to be determined to get the ball to which Kirino wondered why since Kariya is a SEED. Kariya used Hunter's Net to get the ball but failed and was broken through by the tactic. Then the opposing team shot a goal using the shoot hissatsu: Rocket Head and made the second goal, making the score in favor of the opposing team. Tenma asked if Kariya was alright to which Kariya just walked away.As the match resumes, the opposing team uses Tactics Cycle again, and the Raimon team is having a hard time. At the bench, Kirino watches the tactic carefully and realizes something in the tactic in which Endou also noticed this. Ichino later asks how to break the tactic in which Endou states that Kirino should know how to break it. Kirino then states how it moves and how it can be broken. Then he said to the main point, Kariya, who can move and response quickly, with a dark mask on his face. Though Kirino surpasses this and goes to the field. Kirino talks for a short while with Kariya. Shindou and Tenma comes in and states to do their best to which Kariya got irritated with them adding pressure on him. The match resumes again and Kariya tries to get the ball, and as he neared the ball, they passed it to Minamisawa to which Kirino got the ball instead and both Kariya and Kirino passed the ball at each other until they broke through the tactic. Kirino then passes the ball to Tenma, as Tenma neared the goal, he unleashed his keshin; Majin Pegasus and the opposing goalkeeper used his keshin; Kyoshin Gigantes. Then Tenma shoots using his keshin.
24	"Revive! Our Soccer"; Transliteration: "Yomigaere! Ore-tachi no Sakkā" (Japanese: 甦れ!俺たちのサッカー)	October 19, 2011
The end of the match is Raimon's win in the match against Gassan Kunimitsu. Kira Hitomiko is shown to be walking toward at Raimon's old soccer club and talks to Endou about Kariya Masaki's past. Endou Mamoru goes to the base of Fifth Sector and talks to Ishido Shuuji, whom he knows that he's actually Gouenji Shuuya. He asked why Gouenji has changed but instead receives an answer that he is not Gouenji but his name is Ishido. Endou returns home, thinks about the past and looks at the old photo when his whole team; Inazuma Japan won the FFI ten years ago and thinks about Gouenji. A new member also comes in named Kageyama Hikaru, and his last name surprised Endou, Kidou and Otonashi.
25	"He's Coming Back!"; Transliteration: "Aitsu ga Kaettekuru!" (Japanese: あいつが帰ってくる!)	October 26, 2011
Kageyama Hikaru joins the Raimon team. He trains and it is shown that he is a fast learner. Fubuki Shirou reappears and asks Raimon to help and stop Fifth Sector of taking control on his team, Hakuren. Shindou Takuto states that, Nishiki Ryouma is coming back after playing soccer in the Italian League.
26	"The Looming White Devil!"; Transliteration: "Tachihadakaru Shiroi Akuma" (Japanese: 立ちはだかる白い悪魔)	November 2, 2011
Raimon arrives at the train that heads towards Snowland Stadium, then they also meet the Hakuren team. When they arrives at the stadium, the managers comments that it was cold. The Raimon team practices around the field before they start the match. Tenma noticed that the floor was slippery, Hayami had a hard time in the icy floor and also Hamano. The whole Raimon team is having a hard time, though in the other side, it seems that Hakuren is used to the icy floor. Yukimura Hyouga then has a flashback about the past, and how Fubuki Shirou was nice to him and taught him his hissatsu techniques. Then, he states that he is determined to win the match against Raimon.The match of Raimon Vs. Hakuren starts and Raimon loses the ball and is having a hard time because of the slippery floor. Yukimura gets the ball easily and the whole Hakuren team is also having the match easily since the Raimon team can't pass correctly because they are not used to the slippery floor. Yukimura has flashbacks again with the past he had with Fubuki and became more determined again. He jumps and gets the ball from Tenma easily.Then he uses Panther Blizzard to score and Sangoku uses Fence of Gaia but was not able to release the hissatsu since Panther Blizzard was too fast, and it scores the first goal for Hakuren. Yukimura again has flashbacks on how he was able to create Panther Blizzard.Though after some time, Raimon got the hang of the field and was able to pass with ease. They pass it to Tsurugi, but he is blocked by the hissatsu tactic; Zettai Shouheki. Kurama uses Sidewinder and Shirosaki uses Crystal Barrier and blocks the shoot.Then, Hakuren uses their tactic; Zettai Shouheki and Raimon uses Double Wing but is unable to get through it and fails. Yukimura uses Panther Blizzard again but this time, Sangoku stops it with Fence of Gaia.Yukimura uses his keshin Gousetsu no Saia and tries to score another goal.
27	"The Fight on the Ice! Vs Hakuren"; Transliteration: "Hyōjō no Kakutō! VS Hakuren-chū!!" (Japanese: 氷上の格闘！VS白恋中！！)	November 9, 2011
The episode begins with Yukimura breaking through Sangoku's defense and scoring a goal. During the halftime, Nishiki Ryouma return to Raimon and play against Hakuren in the second half. It seems that Kurumada Gouichi and Kageyama Hikaru will be switched into the field. With Nishiki and Hikaru joining the field, Zettai Shouheki is finally broken by Double Wing. Then, Hikaru scored the first goal for Raimon with an amazing shoot. But, Sangoku has been injured, so Matsukaze Tenma again plays in the keeper position. After that, Raimon scored twice with Tsurugi's Lost Angel and Shindou's Harmonics. Also, Yukimura Hyouga realizes that Fubuki Shirou has not betrayed him, contrast to what he thought, and the "light" in his eyes come back. Yukimura shoots again with Icicle Road, and this time it was stopped by Majin Pegasus. Raimon wins by 3-2. Also, Endou Mamoru will leave the Raimon team to investigate something that Fubuki Shirou had told him and leave Kidou Yuuto as the new coach for Raimon.
28	"Coach Kidou's Concern"; Transliteration: "Kantoku Kidō no Fuan" (Japanese: 監督 鬼道 の 不安)	November 16, 2011
With Endou Mamoru leaving the Raimon team, Kidou Yuuto becomes the new coach for the Raimon team. But Endou leaving the team surprises the whole team and shocks them. With Kidou as the new coach, he gives them a new training manual, the problem is that it's giving the Raimon team a hard time. Nishizono Shinsuke and Amagi Daichi disapprove of Kidou's training, and afterwards some of the others Raimon members start to dislike the training method. Tobitaka Seiya also reappears and is shown to be the new owner of Hibiki's Ramen shop.
29	"The Fated Confrontation! Kidokawa Seishuu"; Transliteration: "Syukumei no Taiketsu! Kidokawa Seishū!!" (Japanese: 宿命の対決！木戸川清修！！)	November 23, 2011
Raimon's next match is against the team they fought in last tournament; Kidokawa Seishuu. Unfortunately, this team is also under Fifth Sector's control. Ishido Shuuji meets up with the coach of Kidokawa Seishuu that was revealed to be none other than Afuro Terumi. Raimon's match against Kidokawa Seishuu starts and Raimon gets a hard time with the match against Kidokawa Seishuu.
30	"Magnificent Tactics! Kidou Vs. Aphrodi"; Transliteration: "Karei naru Senjutsu! Kidō vs Afurodi" (Japanese: 華麗なる戦術! 鬼道 vs アフロディ)	November 30, 2011
The battle continues when suddenly the Water World Stadium started to pitch down, surprising both of the teams. Apparently, Kidokawa Seishuu didn't know about this, due to Aphrodi rejecting to know information about the stadium from Ishido Shuuji, saying that he wants to fight with the same condition as Raimon. Then, it is revealed that Someoka just went back to Japan from Italy. Both of the teams were still shocked about the pitch down, and Amagi on the other hand wasn't very satisfied because Kariya and Nishizono failed to stop Kishibe who was about to score.Both teams still surprised about the 'pitch downs' that are unpredictable about their timing to show up, so both of the teams can't attack fully. Both Kidou and Aphrodi think to find the way to attack. Apparently, Aphrodi found a way first. He told his team to use the hissatsu tactics, God Triangle. However, it didn't last long due to Kurumada's Dash Train. But Raimon didn't have the ball for much longer too. And Kariya didn't manage to steal it thanks to Illusion Ball. However, after seeing the 'pitch down' clearly, Kidou finally found a way to counterattack by using hissatsu tactics, Flying Route Pass.After Shindou and Tsurugi are blocked by Kidokawa Seishuu, Hamano used his hissatsu, Naminori Piero and was about to pass it, but it was cut by Taki. Then, Taki used his keshin and scored the first goal for Kidokawa Seishuu. After some time, the ball was in Nishiki's possession but it was stolen by Taki. Later Kariya used Hunter's Net to stop him, but it was stolen again. Then Kishibe, Izumi and Tobisawa used Triangle ZZ to score the second goal for Kidokawa Seishuu.It's half time and Someoka appeared. It seems that Tenma and Shinsuke recognized him. He came to give Nishiki some motivation and brought him some onigiri, too. For the second half, Kidou changed the formation which Tsurugi is switched to be a midfielder, while Nishiki became a forward. Amagi is still upset that Kidou didn't use him in the match even after switching formations.During the second half, Tsurugi was used as a decoy so that he can pass the ball to Nishiki. Nishiki used his keshin, Sengoku Bunshin Musashi, which made Midori surprised. And he made the first goal for Raimon. Then, Kariya used Hunter's Net again to steal the ball from Taki and soon the ball gets to Nishiki. Nishiki used his keshin again and shoots. Even though Katayama used a keshin, he still can't block Nishiki's keshin shoot. And with that, the score is 2 – 2 and it will continue in the next episode.
31	"Keshin! Sengoku Bushin Musashi Appear!"; Transliteration: "Keshin! Sengoku Bushin Musashi kenzan!" (Japanese: 化身！戦国武神ムサシ見参！)	December 7, 2011
Nishiki Ryouma and Matsukaze Tenma will use their keshin for the second half of this match. With this, a heated conclusions arrives after the match of Kidokawa Seishuu and Raimon. The match ends with Raimon's win, and Someoka leaves again after his short visit and says his farewell to Kidou and to the Raimon team
32	"Miracle of The Revolutionary Wind!"; Transliteration: "Kakumei no kiseki!" (Japanese: 革命の軌跡！)	December 14, 2011
Tenma, Shinsuke, Aoi, Akane and Midori are at the school fields. Tenma and Shinsuke practices soccer while the manager came to watch them and Midori brought some food. Shinsuke said that he is going to create a keshin and they all discussed on how to awake a keshin. Later, Shindou came and the talk about "The miracle of wind" in which is appointed to Tenma who brought the biggest miracles into Raimon's soccer. They mostly had flashbacks and discuss about the difference in SEED's keshin and non-SEED's keshin. Near the end of the episode, Endou is shown to be standing on a cliff on an island, wearing the same clothes he wears in the movie.
33	"Mysterious Enemy! Genei Gakuen!"; Transliteration: "Nazo no teki! Gen'ei gakuen!" (Japanese: 謎の敵！幻影学園！)	December 21, 2011
The story starts with everyone in Raimon practicing. Amagi was not concentrating in the practice because he was wondering why he was taken off the regulars and kept from playing in the matches. Hikaru passed the ball to him but he missed it. Hikaru noticed that something was wrong with Amagi, although Kariya is quite carefree about this. Amagi then looked at the soccer ball, considering whether he should quit soccer or not. Just then, Coach Kidou, Raimon's coach, announced that the next opponent was Genei Gakuen. Amagi was shocked hearing that. Haruna then told them about Genei Gakuen's team. Genei Gakuen's team's captain is Mahoro Tadashi. Amagi suddenly thought about his and Mahoro's past. Later, all of the Raimon members continue practicing, Kidou noticed that he didn't concentrate in the practice and told him to leave the grounds. Amagi apologized to him and asked him to give him a chance but Kidou asked him to go home. Then, Aoyama was asked to take his place while Ichino was asked to warm up. On the way home, Amagi thought about his past. When he was about to graduate from elementary school, he was bullied by his classmates without any reason. All of his friends bullied him too. Mahoro was the only one who wanted to be friend with him. But after a while, Mahoro stopped talking to him. The bully had stopped. Amagi started to have many friends but he wasn't happy because Mahoro wouldn't talk to him anymore. Then, he met Mahoro. Again, he asked him the reason why he didn't talk to him but Mahoro didn't reply. He only said that he will defeat Raimon. Then, he left. Amagi seems to be sad. Then, it started to rain. Hikaru came to him with an umbrella. He told him that he will catch a cold if he get wet. They shade under a tree. Hikaru then told him that he had that experience before. He was a transfer student. But he's clumsy with words, so he had hard time saying what was on his mind. He didn't want people to dislike him, so he agreeded to everything, even when he didn't actually agree. The more he went on, the more he get along with everything. At the end, he made everyone angry. After that, he told everyone his honest feelings. He apologized to them. Hikaru then told Amagi that if he talk it out, he might clear up his misunderstandings and he told him that if he shout out, he'll feel a lot better. So, Amagi and Hikaru shouted loudly, together. In the hospital, Tsurugi's brother was in the exercise room. Tenma watched Tsurugi's brother from distance, and then he smiled as he saw Tsurugi's brother worked hard so that he can walk. After that, Tenma went to hospital's backyard, seeing two kids were playing soccer. And then accidentally he met a person who is good in playing soccer. His name is Amemiya Taiyou. Tenma and Taiyou were playing soccer together for a while before Kudou Fuyuka, Amemiya's nurse came and scolded Taiyou because he went outside hospital without permission. After that, Fuyuka told Tenma that Taiyou has a type of sickness.At Fifth Sector's base, Senguuji Daigo appeared and talked to Ishido Shuuji. It appears that he was the one who gave Ishido the Holy Emperor seat. After this, Ishido came to meet Taiyou, he talk with Taiyou about soccer and about the revolution.On the next day, the match between Genei Gakuen took place at the Pinball Stadium. Before the match, Kousaka Yukie appeared and talk to Mahoro, she wants him to understand Amagi's feeling, but Mahoro coldly replied and left.
34	"Non-defense! Maboroshi shot!!" Transliteration: "Bōei fukanou! Maboroshi Syotto!" (Japanese: 防御不可能！マボロシショット！！)	January 4, 2012
Raimon have a match against Genei Gakuen. Raimon can't handle the stadium and got surprised about the stadium. Genei can handle the stadium and also used the stadium in order to pass the ball to their teammates. Mahoro got the ball and shot with Maboroshi Shot and scored the first goal for Genei. After that, Shindou passed the ball to Tenma who passed the ball to Kurama. Kurama used Sidewinder but it got stopped by Utsurogi. Mahoro got the ball and scored the second goal for Genei. The first half ended and Yuki met Amagi and talk with Amagi. The second half started and Tsurugi used Death Drop and scored the first goal for Raimon.
35	"The Shock! Goalkeeper's Substitution"; Transliteration: "Shōgeki no Saihai!kīpā no Kōtai" (Japanese: 衝撃の采配！キーパー交代！！)	January 11, 2012
At the start of the episode, because of Mahoro using a sliding tackle at Hamano he has been injured. And then, Mahoro unleashes his keshin, to which Nishiki blocks with his keshin Sengoku Bunshin Musashi but Mahoro uses a keshin hissatsu and defeats Nishiki's keshin, and Mahoro shoots with his keshin to which Amagi tries to block with his hissatsu along with Kariya but both fail but Sangoku blocks it with Fence of Gaia. Because of Hamano being injured, Aoyama is switched, to which this is Aoyama's first time to play as a part of the first team of Raimon. Hikaru also joins to switch Kurama. Kurama and Midori assist Hamano, but then Midori injures Hamano more, to which just made Kurama smile and he wishes the best of luck for Aoyama and Hikaru.After the whistle blown, Aoyama already shows off his skills by stealing the ball easily and using Presto Turn shockingly, he states that he has been training hard with Ichino all this time, then Hikaru shoots with Extend Zone to which the goalkeeper of Genei wasn't able to block. With this, the score is tied. The real goalkeeper is switched onto the field.Then Shindou uses Harmonics to try and shoot but is blocked. Mahoro uses Maboroshi Shot again and scores a goal again to which makes Amagi more depressed, but Hikaru encourages Amagi. It is also shown again that Ishido Shuuji is watching the match. Hikaru passes the ball to Nishiki and he shoots a goal which makes Raimon tied again.Shinsuke is also switched into the field and is encouraged to try his best, and at the start, he is shown to be able to block the shoots to which others complimented him. And after blocking it, Shindou uses Kami no Takuto and passes the ball to Tsurugi and he shoots the final goal with Lost Angel to which Raimon is now in the lead. With few minutes left, Mahoro shoots with Maborshi Shot, but this time Amagi blocks it with his new hissatsu, Atlantis Wall and finally Raimon wins. Mahoro remembers the old times he plays with Amagi and he's happy to see Amagi again.Both three of friends talk again about the past and finally all was settled between the three of them. Finally, Tenma makes a phone call to Amemiya Taiyou and talks for a bit. At the end, a wind blew again.
36	"Reunion of Fate"; Transliteration: "Unmei no saikai" (Japanese: 運命の再会)	January 18, 2012
After seeing Raimon's victories and the revolution, which is getting stronger and stronger, Fifth Sector has decided to close all schools that follow Raimon's revolution. This makes Tenma feel that he's guilty, and he ran off. After this, at the field beside the riverbank, Tenma has a fated reunion with the person who had saved him when he was about to be injured by the falling wooden planks 10 years ago!
37	"A Genius Of Glasswork!"; Transliteration: "Garasusaiku no tensai!" (Japanese: 硝子細工の天才！)	January 25, 2012
Nishizono Shinsuke was having doubts about playing as a goalkeeper, and as a result did not have enough confidence to do it, so he became depressed. Seeing this, Otonashi decided to use get help from Tachimukai Yuuki, her former friend and a goalkeeper of Inazuma Japan. Thanks to Tachimukai's help and advice, Shinsuke began to gain confidence about being a keeper. Then, Minamisawa came to visit Raimon along with Hyoudou Tsukasa, in order to help them train. Under Hyoudou's supervision and Sangoku's encouragement, Shinsuke trained with the others in his new position. At the end, he is finally able to awaken his Keshin...
38	"Taiyou's Keshin Unleashed!"; Transliteration: "Tokihanatareru Taiyō no Kenshin!" (Japanese: 解き放たれる太陽の化身！)	February 1, 2012
The semi-final match between Raimon and Arakumo Gakuen takes place at Desert Stadium, and Raimon is having problems with the stadium's special feature. What's more, Arakumo Gakuen's "best player" has come to play his first match in Holy Road, and he surprised everyone with his overwhelming skills. However, Shinsuke has finally mastered his Keshin, and the game has seems to turn in to Raimon's favor. But for how long will this "favor" be on Raimon's side?
39	"Tenma VS Taiyou!"; Transliteration: "Tenma VS taiyō!" (Japanese: 天馬VS太陽！)	February 8, 2012
The match between Raimon and Arakumo Gakuen moves on to its second half. Tenma has finally realized Taiyou's true intention and feeling, he decided to face Taiyou with everything he's got, and finally awakened the true power of his Keshin. With this, the semi-final match's outcome was decided. However, after the match has ended, an unexpected development has occurred...
40	"The New Captain! Matsukaze Tenma!"; Transliteration: "Shin kyaputen! Matsukaze tenma!" (Japanese: 新キャプテン！松風天馬！)	February 15, 2012
Just when Raimon was about to move on to the final match with their full spirit, a shocking development has occurred to Raimon: Shindou can't participate in the final match due to injury. This make the team very depressed and cannot focus on their training. This is when Endou returned and suddenly appoint Tenma as the new captain of the Raimon soccer club...
41	"Battle! Amano Mikado Stadium!"; Transliteration: "Kessen! Amanomikadosutajiamu!" (Japanese: 決戦！アマノミカドスタジアム！)	February 22, 2012
Tsurugi Kyousuke approached Tenma to train for Fire Tornado DD. So they trained everyday before the match but they failed to learn the hissatsu. Seidouzan used their formation to block Raimon's passes during the match and the first half ends with a 1-1 tie.
42	"The Strongest Enemy Appear! Dragonlink!"; Transliteration: "Shutsugen, saikyō no teki! Doragon no rinku!" (Japanese: 出現、最強の敵！ドラゴンリンク！)	February 29, 2012
The episode starts with a recap, Tsurugi shooting Death Drop to the goal and the score becoming a 1-1 tie. The match continues with Seidouzan's kickoff. Passing Raimon's players without stopping, Kurosaki is one-on-one with the goalkeeper soon after that. Kurosaki summoned his Keshin, Enma Gazard, and used his keshin shoot, Bakunetsu Storm to score the second goal for Seidouzan. After that, Endou found out more of Ishido's feelings more from how Seidouzan played soccer. Kurosaki later commented to Tenma that that was how Seidouzan played soccer and walked off. Senguuji, who was watching the match said that Seidouzan is not doing Fifth Sector's soccer and said the time to use Dragonlink has arrived. Back at the Resistance, Hiroto was shocked that Midorikawa found Dragonlink's true identity, and Midorikawa commented on it being unbelievable, but its identity still remained a mystery.Back at the match, Raimon starts to counterattack but was stopped by Seidouzan. However, Kirino steals the ball using The Mist and the counterattack continues. It later succeeded with Nishiki using his Keshin, Sengoku Bushin Musashi, which scored a goal. The first half ended at a 2-2 tie.Dragonlink starts walking towards the stadium. At Raimon's side, Tenma was wondering about his competency as a captain but was encouraged by the other team members. Endou also said to him that when the captain's skills are really needed is during a crisis, and whether he is able to support the team during that time is important and told Tenma not to forget that. At Seidouzan's side, the team asked for Ishido's orders. Ishido smiled and said that he's leaving the team to make their own decisions and told them to fight freely, to which Seidouzan was shocked. Ishido continued by saying that he has faith in the team he had raised. Kurosaki said that they will confront Raimon at full power. Saginuma enthusiastically encouraged them and the team and Saginuma ran out of the room.When Toramaru and Ishido left the room later, they were summoned to Senguuji's place. Senguuji recalled his memories of when he was a child when Ishido and Toramaru arrived. When Ishido arrived, Senguuji commented that he was really disappointed with Ishido with the 2-2 tie and told Ishido that he is sacked from being Seidouzan's coach immediately to which Ishido was not shocked but Toramaru was. What made Ishido shocked was that Senguuji continued to say that he will fight Raimon with his own team which he raised. He exclaimed that Seidouzan will be reborn as a new team.Not that much later, the ground started shaking and the audience panicked. It was actually the structure of the stadium being reformed. Later, Midorikawa and Hiroto are seen heading towards the stadium and Midorikawa attempted to contact Endou. When Tenma expected to see Kurosaki, he saw Senguuji Yamato and another team instead. Raimon was complaining about it and Tenma asked Senguuji about Kurosaki. Senguuji Yamato said that he didn't care and said that his team is Fifth Sector's strongest team, Dragonlink.Tenma wondered what happened to Kurosaki and Nishiki told Tenma to concentrate. It was then revealed that Gouenji became the Holy Emperor so that he could protect soccer, rather than controlling it. Haruna was shocked but Kidou seemed like he already knew it. In Tenma's recap, Senguuji said that he created Fifth Sector. He said to Tenma that he did not have the right to play soccer when he was young, and later insisted that soccer must be controlled. The second half started, and Gotou kicked the ball to into Raimon's side of the field and everyone thought that it was a miskick, but it didn't seem like a miskick. Kirino stopped the ball, and then passed the ball to Hamano, who passed the ball to Nishiki. Nishiki began to dribble forward, and then the forwards summoned their Keshin, to which everyone was shocked. Shindou, who was watching at the hospital, was also shocked as well.
43	"Heroic! The Last Battle!"; Transliteration: "Sōzetsu! Saigo no seisen!!" (Japanese: 壮絶！最後の聖戦！！)	March 7, 2012
The second half begins, and all of the players of Seidouzan are replaced. Fifth Sector's founder, Senguuji Daigo, becomes the coach and leads Dragonlink. Raimon turns to fighting with avatars during the match. Shockingly, all of their members are keshin users. Then, Raimon tried to fight against them using their own Keshin, but, even doing that, they can't stop Dragonlink's.
44	"Reach For The Heaven! Everyone's Soccer!"; Transliteration: "Ten made todoke! Min'na no sakkā!" (Japanese: 天まで届け！みんなのサッカー！)	March 14, 2012
Despairing over his strategy failing, Tenma lost his confidence as the captain of his team. He was suddenly motivated by Shindou who came into the stadium. After that, they started to do their own soccer and Tenma uses all his effort. Aiming for victory, the final fight against Dragonlink begins. And finally Raimon wins the match. The match ended with 5-4. It is revealed that Gouenji left his place on Japans national team to become Senguuji Daigo's servant. He became the new Holy Emperor and arranged the revolution from the inside. Gouenji stated that soccer is his savior and Fifth Sector's soccer couldn't save anyone.
45	"The Pass to Tomorrow"; Transliteration: "Mirai he no pasu" (Japanese: 未来へのパス)	March 21, 2012
Dragonlink lost against Raimon. When people get to enjoy free soccer again, Raimon went back to practice. Believing in the best teammates, they achieved the best soccer. Tenma, with the soccer ball which led him in the revolution till now, starts to reflect on his past. Finally the original captain returns which is Shindou Takuto and here Tenma and Aoi start to remember about their past and in the middle appears Gouenji Shuuya, which he along Tenma are watching from far the kids, who were playing soccer.
46	"The TV Station Came!"; Transliteration: "Terebikyoku ga kita!" (Japanese: テレビ局が来た！)	April 4, 2012
A reporter came by and asked young soccer players such as the members of the Inazuma KFC which persons do they like in the Raimon team. During this interview, the Raimon team was seen watching and they reflect on how long they struggled to free soccer.
47	"This is the Raimon Soccer Club!"; Transliteration: "Kore ga raimonchū sakkābuda!" (Japanese: これが雷門中サッカー部だ！)	April 11, 2012
The story starts with Tominaga Jun interviewing Endou and Aki as the former Raimon soccer members. There, Aki and Endou tells how they formed the soccer club, recruiting new members with Handa and Someoka as their one of the few first soccer club members. Later on, Endou says the name of the peoples he met from the start of the Aliea Gakuen Arc until FFI, one by one. The whole scene was Endou's flashback through his childhood. During the interviewing session, Kariya was excited that a celebrity (Tominaga Jun) came to their school and he already prepared an autograph board for her autograph but trying to keep his cool by denying his attention to ask for autograph. Near the end of the episode, Tenma feels motivated by Endou's story and walks toward him to speak up his determination. Kariya was hesitating with Tenma's action, saying that he shouldn't interfere but as Kakuma said Tenma's barging was a great scene, Kariya later agree easily and hides the autograph board behind him. At the end of the episode the mysterious organization appears, El Dorado. The episode ends with their leader, Toudou Heikichi, saying: I have confirmed the interruption point, start the modification.
