= Inazuma Eleven GO: Galaxy (TV series) =

- Season 3
- Third Japanese DVD cover for Inazuma Eleven GO
- No. of episodes: 43

Release
- Original network: TV Tokyo
- Original release: May 8, 2013 – March 19, 2014

Series chronology
- ← Previous; GO: Chrono Stone Next → Ares

Inazuma Eleven GO: Galaxy (イナズマイレブン GO ギャラクシー, Inazuma Irebun GO: Galaxy; lit. "Lightning Eleven GO: Galaxy") is the third and final season of the Japanese anime television series Inazuma Eleven GO. It is based on Level-5's video game of the same name. The season consists of 43 episodes. The season aired on the TV Tokyo network from May 8, 2013, to March 19, 2014. The season was produced by Level-5 in conjunction with TV Tokyo, Dentsu, and OLM.

== Scenario ==
In the final season of Inazuma Eleven Go Series, Football Frontier International Vision 2 (FFI V2) is being held, and elite soccer teams from around the world compete for a spot in Shinsei Inazuma Japan: Japan's new national soccer team. Tenma becomes captain of Inazuma National, the representative team for Japan, but eight of his teammates have never played soccer before. Together, they must reorganize and strategize in order to win.

Later, as Shinsei Inazuma Japan advanced through the Asia premilinaries, a terrible truth unfolds—FFIV2 is actually the preliminaries of District A of an interplanetary tournament: Grand Celesta Galaxy. In order to save Earth from elimination, Earth Eleven must win through the tournament against all kinds of aliens...

== Characters ==
Arion Sherwind ((松風まつかぜ 天馬てんま, Matsukaze Tenma)
Is the main protagonist of the Inazuma Eleven GO series. He is a midfielder and he later became the captain for Raimon when Shindou Takuto got hospitalized.In the Chrono Stone series, he became a midfielder and captain for Tenmas, Raimon, Entaku no Kishi, El Dorado Team 03, Chrono Storm and Shinsei Inazuma Japan (alternate timeline). In the Galaxy series, he was chosen to be a midfielder and captain for Japan's team, Inazuma Japan. After the truth was revealed behind the FFIV2, he became a midfielder and captain for Earth Eleven.
Victor Blade ((剣城つるぎ 京介きょうすけ, Tsurugi Kyousuke)
Is one of the main protagonists of the Inazuma Eleven GO series. He is a forward for Raimon, Raimon (Chrono Stone), Chrono Storm and later in Galaxy, a forward for Inazuma Japan and Earth Eleven.
Riccardo Di Rigo ((神童しんどう 拓人たくと), Shindou Takuto)
Is a main protagonist of the Inazuma Eleven GO series. He was a forward, in the past, and midfielder and also the captain for Raimon. After he got hospitalized, he decided that Matsukaze Tenma should become captain for Raimon. In the Chrono Stone series, he became a defensive midfielder for Raimon, Entaku no Kishi, El Dorado Team 02, also being captain for the team, and for Chrono Storm.

== Theme songs ==
Opening songs (Season 3/Galaxy)

1. Gachi de Katouze! (eps 1-17) by T-Pistonz+KMC
2. Chikyuu wo Mawase! (eps 18-32) by T-Pistonz+KMC
3. Supernova! (eps 33-43) by T-Pistonz+KMC

Ending songs (Season 3/Galaxy)

1. Katte ni Cinderella (eps 1-17) by Sorano Aoi (CV:Kitahara Sayaka) and Morimura Konoha (CV:Yuuki Aoi )
2. Fashion☆Uchuu Senshi (eps 18-32) by Sorano Aoi (CV:Kitahara Sayaka) and Mizukawa Minori (CV: Ayahi Takagaki)
3. Arashi Tatsumaki Hurricane (eps 33-42) by Sorano Aoi (CV:Kitahara Sayaka) and Kobayashi Yuu
4. Hontou Ni Arigatou! (ep 43) by Endou Mamoru (CV:Takeuchi Junko) and Matsukaze Tenma (CV:Terasaki Yuka)

== Episode list ==
https://www.imdb.com/title/tt8533890/

No.	English title (Translated title)	Original release date
1	"Worst! Newborn Inazuma Japan!!"; Transliteration: "Saiaku! Shinsei inazumajapan! !" (Japanese: 最悪！新生イナズマジャパン！！)	May 8, 2013
2	"Dark Clouds Rolls In! World Congress Kicks Off! !"; Transliteration: "Tachikomeru an'un! Sekai taikai kaimaku! !" (Japanese: 立ち込める暗雲！世界大会開幕！！)	May 15, 2013
3	"Small Change!"; Transliteration: "Chīsana henka!" (Japanese: 小さな変化！)	May 22, 2013
4	"The Enigma of the Team's Formation"; Transliteration: "Chīmu kessei no nazo" (Japanese: チーム結成の謎)	May 29, 2013
5	"Inazuma Japan Withdrawal Exam!"; Transliteration: "Inazumajapan dattai shiken!" (Japanese: イナズマジャパン脱退試験！)	June 5, 2013
6	"The Enemy Within The Team!"; Transliteration: "Chīmu no naka no teki!" (Japanese: チームの中の敵！)	June 12, 2013
7	"Let's Play Fun Soccer!"; Transliteration: "Tanoshī sakkā wo shiyou!" (Japanese: 楽しいサッカーをしよう！)	June 19, 2013
8	"Kusaka's Two Faces"; Transliteration: "Kusaka no futatsu no kao" (Japanese: 九坂の二つの顔)	June 26, 2013
9	"The Emperor's Tears!"; Transliteration: "Teiō no namida!" (Japanese: 帝王の涙!)	July 3, 2013
10	"Training! The Black Room!!"; Transliteration: "Tokkun! Burakku Rūmu!!" (Japanese: 特訓！ブラックルーム！！)	July 10, 2013
11	"Self Hatred!"; Transliteration: "Jibun Girai" (Japanese: じぶん嫌い)	July 17, 2013
12	"Confession on the Field"; Transliteration: "Fīrudo no kokuhaku" (Japanese: フィールドの告白)	July 24, 2013
13	"Key to Victory"; Transliteration: "Shōri e no kaihō" (Japanese: 勝利への解法)	July 31, 2013
14	"Assault! Resistance Japan!!"; Transliteration: "Kyōshū! Rejisutansu Japan !!" (Japanese: 強襲！レジスタンスジャパン！！)	August 7, 2013
15	"Fierce Battle! Challenge of the World!!"; Transliteration: "Gekitou! Sekai e no Chousen!!" (Japanese: 激闘！世界ヘの挑戰！！)	August 14, 2013
16	"The Power to Trust and Unite!"; Transliteration: "Shinraishi kessoku suru chikara" (Japanese: 信賴し結束する力)	August 21, 2013
17	"The End and the Beginning of a Battle"; Transliteration: "Tatakai no Owari to Hajimari" (Japanese: 戰いの終わりと始まり)	August 28, 2013
18	"A Visitor"; Transliteration: "Raihō-sha" (Japanese: 来訪者)	September 4, 2013
19	"Let's go! To Space!!"; Transliteration: "Ikuzo! Uchuu e!!" (Japanese: 行くぞ! 宇宙へ!!)	September 11, 2013
20	"Arrival at the Sand Planet!!"; Transliteration: "Suna no Hoshi ni Yattekita!!" (Japanese: 砂の星にやってきた！！)	September 18, 2013
21	"Berserk! The Black Room!!"; Transliteration: "Bōsō! Burakku Rūmu!!" (Japanese: 暴走！ブラックルーム！！)	October 9, 2013
22	"Clash! Space Soccer!!"; Transliteration: "Gekitotsu! Uchū Sakkā!!" (Japanese: 激突！宇宙サッカー！！)	October 16, 2013
23	"Soul's Appearance"; Transliteration: "Souru Shutsugen!" (Japanese: 獣 出現！)	October 23, 2013
24	"The Warriors of the Water Planet"; Transliteration: "Mizu no Hoshi no Senshitachi!" (Japanese: 水の星の戦士たち！)	October 30, 2013
25	"Matatagi Hayato's Darkness!"; Transliteration: "Matatagi Hayato no Yami!" (Japanese: 瞬木隼人の闇！)	November 6, 2013
26	"Awaken! My Dark Side!!"; Transliteration: "Mezameyo! Ore no Dāku Saido!!" (Japanese: 目覚めよ! 俺のダークサイド!!)	November 13, 2013
27	"Minaho's Own Goal!"; Transliteration: "Minaho no Oun Gōru!" (Japanese: 皆帆のオウンゴール！)	November 20, 2013
28	"The Volcanic Planet Gardon!"; Transliteration: "Shakunetsu no Wakusei Gādon!" (Japanese: 灼熱の惑星ガードン！)	November 27, 2013
29	"Warriors who Cast Aside their Wings"; Transliteration: "Tsubasa wo Suteta Senshitachi" (Japanese: 翼を捨てた戦士たち)	December 4, 2013
30	"Intense! Shoot Counter!!"; Transliteration: "Kyōretsu! Shūto Kauntā! !" (Japanese: 強烈！シュートカウンター！！)	December 11, 2013
31	"Double Soul! Ibuki and Shindō!!"; Transliteration: "Daburu Sōru! Ibuki to Shindō! !" (Japanese: ダブルソウル！井吹と神童！！)	December 18, 2013
32	"The Green Planet Latonique!"; Transliteration: "Midori no Wakusei Ratonīku!" (Japanese: 緑の惑星ラトニーク)	December 25, 2013
33	"Limited Time! Eternal Friendship!!"; Transliteration: "Kagiri aru Jikan! Eien no Yūjō! !" (Japanese: 限りある時間！永遠の友情！！)	January 8, 2014
34	"The Tearful Shoot of Rage!"; Transliteration: "Namida no Dohatsuten Shūto!" (Japanese: 涙の怒髪天シュート!)	January 15, 2014
35	"The Fragment of Hope"; Transliteration: "Kibō no kakera" (Japanese: 希望の欠片)	January 22, 2014
36	"The Ultimate Misfortune! The Birth of Ixal Fleet!!"; Transliteration: "Saikyō! Ikusarufurīto tanjō! !" (Japanese: 最凶! イクサルフリート誕生! !)	January 29, 2014
37	"Decisive Battle! Faram Dite!!"; Transliteration: "Kessen! Faramu Dīte! !" (Japanese: 決戦! ファラム・ディーテ! !)	February 5, 2014
38	"Tenma VS Tsurugi!"; Transliteration: "Tenma tai Tsurugi!" (Japanese: 天馬VS剣城!)	February 12, 2014
39	"Take Flight! My Soul!!"; Transliteration: "Kakero! Ore no Sōru! !" (Japanese: 翔ろ！俺のソウル！！)	February 19, 2014
40	"Our Last Battle!"; Transliteration: "Oretachi no Saigo no Tatakai!" (Japanese: 俺たちの最後の戰い！)	February 26, 2014
41	"The Soul on Rampage!"; Transliteration: "Bōsō suru Souru!" (Japanese: 暴走するソウル！)	March 5, 2014
42	"Storm Tornado Hurricane!"; Transliteration: "Arashi Tatsumaki Harikēn!" (Japanese: 嵐・竜巻・ハリケーン！)	March 12, 2014
43	"The Last Kick! Fly Towards Tomorrow!"; Transliteration: "Saigo no kikku! Mirai Ni Mukatte Tobe!" (Japanese: 最後のキック！未来に向かって飛べ！)	March 19, 2014
