= List of Oricon number-one manga of 2015 =

This is a list of the best selling manga published weekly by Oricon in Japan in 2015.

== Chart history ==
| List publication date | Sales period | Title | Author | Publisher | Copies | Reference |
|---|---|---|---|---|---|---|
| January 5 | December 22–28 | One Piece, 76 | Eiichiro Oda | Shueisha | 1,441,768 | |
| January 12 | December 29–January 4 | One Piece, 76 | Eiichiro Oda | Shueisha | 954,354 | |
| January 19 | January 5–11 | Blue Exorcist, 14 | Kazue Katō | Shueisha | 401,206 | |
| January 26 | January 12–18 | Fairy Tail, 47 | Hiro Mashima | Kodansha | 174,340 | |
| February 2 | January 19–25 | Kimi ni Todoke, 23 | Karuho Shiina | Shueisha | 269,387 | |
| February 9 | January 26–February 1 | Kimi ni Todoke, 23 | Karuho Shiina | Shueisha | 259,016 | |
| February 16 | February 2–8 | Naruto, 72 | Masashi Kishimoto | Shueisha | 874,120 | |
| February 23 | February 9–15 | The Heroic Legend of Arslan, 3 | Hiromu Arakawa | Kodansha | 218,497 | |
| March 2 | February 16–22 | The Seven Deadly Sins, 13 | Nakaba Suzuki | Kodansha | 442,492 | |
| March 9 | February 23–March 1 | Saint Young Men, 11 | Hikaru Nakamura | Kodansha | 386,394 | |
| March 16 | March 2–8 | Assassination Classroom, 13 | Yūsei Matsui | Shueisha | 422,688 | |
| March 23 | March 9–15 | The Ancient Magus' Bride, 3 | Kore Yamazaki | Mag Garden | 174,493 | |
| March 30 | March 16–22 | Tokyo Ghoul:re, 2 | Sui Ishida | Shueisha | 434,675 | |
| April 6 | March 23–29 | Tokyo Ghoul:re, 2 | Sui Ishida | Shueisha | 182,008 | |
| April 13 | March 30–April 5 | One Piece, 77 | Eiichiro Oda | Shueisha | 1,668,225 | |
| April 20 | April 6–12 | Attack on Titan, 16 | Hajime Isayama | Kodansha | 868,694 | |
| April 27 | April 13–19 | Attack on Titan, 16 | Hajime Isayama | Kodansha | 352,615 | |
| May 4 | April 20–26 | The Seven Deadly Sins, 14 | Nakaba Suzuki | Kodansha | 245,122 | |
| May 11 | April 27–May 3 | Haikyū!!, 16 | Haruichi Furudate | Shueisha | 384,752 | |
| May 18 | May 4–May 11 | Assassination Classroom, 14 | Yūsei Matsui | Shueisha | 285,069 | |
| May 25 | May 12–May 19 | Barakamon, 11 | Satsuki Yoshino | Square Enix | 207,220 | |
| June 1 | May 20–May 27 | Terra Formars, 13 | Yū Sasuga | Shueisha | 345,293 | |

== See also ==
- 2015 in manga
