= 2015 in manga =

The following is an overview of 2015 in manga. It includes winners of notable awards, best-sellers, title debuts and endings, deaths of notable manga-related people as well as any other relevant manga-related events. For an overview of the year in comics from other countries, see 2015 in comics.

== Awards ==
- 39th Kodansha Manga Awards
  - Best Shōnen Manga: The Seven Deadly Sins by Nakaba Suzuki and Yowamushi Pedal by Wataru Watanabe
  - Best Shōjo Manga: Nigeru wa Haji da ga Yaku ni Tatsu by Tsunami Umino
  - Best General Manga: Knights of Sidonia by Tsutomu Nihei
  - Special Award: Cooking Papa by Tochi Ueyama
- 8th Manga Taishō: Kakukaku Shikajika by Akiko Higashimura
- 46th Seiun Awards
  - Best Comic: Moyasimon: Tales of Agriculture by Masayuki Ishikawa
- 60th Shogakukan Manga Awards
  - Best Children's Manga: Yōkai Watch by Noriyuki Konishi
  - Best Shōnen Manga: Be Blues! - Ao ni Nare by Motoyuki Tanaka
  - Best Shōjo Manga: Joō no Hana by Kaneyoshi Izumi
  - Best General Manga: Asahinagu by Ai Kozaki and Aoi Honō by Kazuhiko Shimamoto
- 19th Tezuka Osamu Cultural Prize
  - Grand Prize: Aisawa Riku by Yoiko Hoshi
  - New Creator Prize: A Silent Voice by Yoshitoki Ōima
  - Short Work Prize: Sensha Yoshida
  - Special Prize: Chikako Mitsuhashi for Chiisana Koi no Monogatari

== Best-sellers ==
=== Titles ===
The following is a list of the 10 best-selling manga titles in Japan during 2015 according to Oricon.

Rank	Title	Copies
1	One Piece	14,102,521
2	The Seven Deadly Sins	10,304,112
3	Attack on Titan	8,778,048
4	Assassination Classroom	8,605,861
5	Kingdom	8,569,215
6	Haikyu!!	6,531,508
7	Food Wars: Shokugeki no Soma	4,321,830
8	Terra Formars	4,188,158
9	Prison School	4,058,119
10	Tokyo Ghoul:re	3,758,541

=== Volumes ===
The following is a list of the 10 best-selling manga volumes in Japan during 2015 according to Oricon.

Rank	Volume	Copies
1	One Piece vol.76	3,185,018
2	One Piece vol.77	3,020,137
3	One Piece vol.78	2,977,466
4	One Piece vol.79	2,810,583
5	Attack on Titan vol.15	2,000,137
6	Attack on Titan vol.16	1,920,780
7	Attack on Titan vol.17	1,807,155
8	Naruto vol.72	1,324,693
9	Tokyo Ghoul:re vol.1	1,017,871
10	Assassination Classroom vol.12	1,012,500

== Title debuts ==
- January - Anti-Magic Academy: The 35th Test Platoon by Yohei Yasumura
- January - Q.E.D. iff - proven end - by Motohiro Katou
- January 27 - Zettai Zetsubō Shōjo: Danganronpa AE Genocider Mode, written by Spike Chunsoft and illustrated by Machika Minami
- January 30 - Manabi Straight! Sakra, written by Ufotable and illustrated by Eshika/Shōgo
- February - Fushigi Yûgi Byakko Ibun by Yuu Watase
- February - Heavy Object A, written by Kazuma Kamachi and illustrated by Sakae Saitō
- February 12 - Aldnoah.Zero 2nd Season, written by Olympus Knights and illustrated by Mahi Fuyube
- February 15 - Boys Over Flowers Season 2 by Yoko Kamio
- February 16 - The Case of Hana & Alice by Dowman Sayman
- February 20 - Danganronpa Another Episode: Ultra Despair Girls, written by Spike Chunsoft, illustrated by Hajime Tōya
- March - Go! Princess PreCure, written by Izumi Todo and illustrated by Futago Kamikita
- March - Love in Hell: Death Life by Reiji Suzumaru
- March - Maō Da Ze! Oreca Battle by Satoshi Yamaura
- March 3 - Shokugeki no Soma - L'étoile, written by Michiko Itō and illustrated by Shun Saeki
- March 7 - Piece of Cake: Bangai-hen Piece 1 by George Asakura
- March 31 - Mahou Shoujo Nante Mouiidesukara by Sui Futami
- April - Komasan: A Time for Fireworks and Miracles by Shou Shibamoto
- April - Serapetit!〜Seraph of the End four-frame manga〜, written by Takaya Kagami, Yamato Yamamoto and Daisuke Furuya and illustrated by Ren Aokita
- April - Yo-kai Watch: 4-Koma Pun-Club by Santa Harukaze
- April 3 - Yu-Gi-Oh! Arc-V: Saikyō Duelist Yuya by Akihiro Tomonaga
- April 18 - K: Missing Kings, written by Hideyuki Furuhashi and illustrated by Haruto Shiota
- April 22 - Fushigi na Somera-chan Haute Couture by Choborau Nyopomi
- April 22 - Grimgar of Fantasy and Ash by Mutsumi Okubashi
- April 27 - Girls und Panzer: Little Army II by Tsuchii
- April 27 - Naruto: The Seventh Hokage and the Scarlet Spring by Masashi Kishimoto
- May 12 - Trash Market by Tadao Tsuge
- May 22 - Star-Myu by Ren Hidoh
- May 27 - Re:Zero kara Hajimeru Isekai Seikatsu: Daisanshō - Truth of Zero, written by Tappei Nagatsuki and illustrated by Daichi Matsuse
- May 28 - Marriage ~The Drops of God Final Arc~, written by Tadashi Agi and illustrated by Shu Okimoto
- June - Plastic Memories: Say to Good-bye, written by Naotaka Hayashi and illustrated by Yūyū
- June - Yo-Kai Watch Busters by Atsushi Ohba
- June 20 - Dragon Ball Super, written by Akira Toriyama and illustrated by Toyotarou
- June 26 - Hybrid x Heart Magias Academy Ataraxia by Riku Ayakawa
- June 27 - Classroom Crisis by Masaharu Takano
- July 13 - Queen's Quality by Kyousuke Motomi
- August - Beyblade: Burst
- August - Monster Musume: I ♥ Monster Girls by Shake-O, SaQ Tottori and Cool-Kyou-Sinnjya
- August 9 - Lost Girls by Ryōsuke Fuji
- August 19 - Little Witch Academia, written by Trigger and illustrated by Terio Teri
- August 21 - Yu-Gi-Oh! Arc-V by Naohito Miyoshi
- September - Charlotte, written by Jun Maeda and illustrated by Makoto Ikezawa and Yū Tsurusaki
- September - Concrete Revolutio by Nylon
- September 3 - Little Witch Academia: Tsukiyo no Ōkan by Yuka Fujiwara
- September 4 - Fruits Basket another by Natsuki Takaya
- September 18 - Dance with Devils -Blight- by Samako Natsu
- September 28 - K: Dream of Green, written by GoRA and illustrated by Yui Kuroe
- October - Cyborg 009 Vs. Devilman: Breakdown by Akihito Yoshitomi
- October - Mobile Suit Gundam: Iron-Blooded Orphans by Kazuma Isobe
- October 2 - Koro-sensei Q! by Kizuku Watanabe and Jō Aoto
- October 16 - Baccano by Shinta Fujimoto
- October 17 - K: Return of Kings, written by Hideyuki Furuhashi and illustrated by Haruto Shiota
- October 26 - Aokana: Four Rhythm Across the Blue, written by Sprite and illustrated by Hideyu Tōgarashi
- October 27 - Hai-Furi by Kanari Abe
- October 27 - My Girlfriend is a T-Rex by Sanzo
- November 4 - Platinum End, written by Tsugumi Ohba and illustrated by Takeshi Obata
- November 4 - Terra Formars Asimov by Boichi
- November 9 - My Hero Academia Smash!! by Hirofumi Neda and Kōhei Horikoshi
- November 17 - GANTZ:G, written by Hiroya Oku and illustrated by Keita Iizuka
- November 27 - Prince of Stride: Galaxy Rush by Teruko Arai
- November 28 - The Seven Deadly Sins Production by Chiemi Sakamoto
- December - Haruchika, written by Sei Hatsuno and illustrated by Būta
- December 1 - Hozuki no Reitetsu ~Shiro no Ashiato~ by Monaka Shiba
- Ace of Diamond Act II
- Kare Baka: Wagahai no Kare wa Baka de R, written by Kazusa Yoneda and illustrated by Saki Azumi
- Major 2nd by Takuya Mitsuda
- Senyuu. Main Quest - Dai Nishou by Robinson Haruhara
- The Unlimit d: Hyōbu Kyōsuke - WANDERER by Rokurou Ogaki

== Title endings ==
- February - HappinessCharge PreCure!, written by Izumi Todo and illustrated by Futago Kamikita
- February - Monster Retsuden Oreca Battle by Satoshi Yamaura
- March 29 - Cross Ange: Tenshi to Ryū no Ecole by Osaji
- April - Jinsei, written by Jinsei: Manga no Shō and illustrated by Seiji Matsuyama
- June 4 - Complex Age by Yui Sakuma
- June 17 - Himegoto by Norio Tsukudani
- June 25 - Cute High Earth Defense Club Love! by Umatani Kurari
- June 27 - Himegoto
- July 6 - Naruto: The Seventh Hokage and the Scarlet Spring by Masashi Kishimoto
- July 17 - Fairy Tail Zero by Hiro Mashima
- August 18 - K: Missing Kings, written by Hideyuki Furuhashi and illustrated by Haruto Shiota
- August 19 - Girls und Panzer: Gekitou! Maginot-sen Desu!! by Ryūichi Saitaniya
- August - Chain Chronicle Crimson by Junpei Okazaki
- September - Komasan: A Time for Fireworks and Miracles by Shou Shibamoto
- October - Yo-Kai Watch Busters by Atsushi Ohba
- November 20 - Little Witch Academia, written by Trigger and illustrated by Terio Teri
- December 1 - Fairy Tail: Blue Mistral by Rui Watanabe
- Senyuu. Main Quest - Dai Nishou by Robinson Haruhara

== Deaths ==
- Kazumasa Hirai, writer, manga writer
- March - Yoshihiro Tatsumi, manga artist
- March 31 - Cocoa Fujiwara, manga artist
- April - Kō Kojima, manga artist
- June 17 - Masaki Himura, manga artist
- August 18 - Hinako Konno, manga writer
- October 22 - Kōji Miyata, manga artist
- November 21 - Jinpachi Mori, manga writer
- November - Shigeru Mizuki, manga artist

== See also ==
- 2015 in anime
- 2015 in Japanese literature
