= Chaos Dragon =

Japanese media franchise

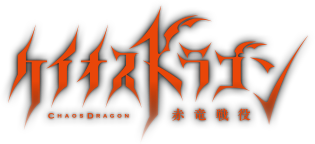

ケイオスドラゴン (Keiosu Doragon)
- Anime television series

Chaos Dragon: Sekiryū Sen'eki
- Directed by: Hideki Tachibana (Chief); Masato Matsune
- Produced by: Takayuki Funabashi; Yūsuke Kamimachi; Taka Yoshizawa
- Written by: Ukyō Kodachi; Shō Aikawa
- Music by: Hitoshi Sakimoto
- Studio: Silver Link; Connect
- Licensed by: AUS: Madman Entertainment; BI/NA: Funimation
- Original network: Tokyo MX, KBS, BS11, Sun TV, AT-X
- Original run: July 2, 2015 – September 17, 2015
- Episodes: 12
- Video game

Chaos Dragon: Konton Senso
- Developer: Sega
- Publisher: Sega
- Music by: Hitoshi Sakimoto
- Genre: Role-playing game
- Platform: Android, iOS
- Released: Android: JP: July 2, 2015; iOS: JP: August 13, 2015

Chaos Dragon (Japanese: ケイオスドラゴン, Hepburn: Keiosu Doragon) is a Japanese media franchise based on the Japanese role-playing game Red Dragon by Makoto Sanda, featuring characters created by Gen Urobuchi, Kinoko Nasu, Izuki Kogyoku, Simadoriru, and Ryōgo Narita.

An anime television series titled Chaos Dragon: Sekiryū Sen'eki (ケイオスドラゴン 赤竜戦役), produced by Silver Link and Connect, aired from July 2015 to September 2015. AnimeLab has secured streaming rights in Australia & New Zealand. The franchise also includes a board game, titled Chaos Dragon: Haō Shunjū, and a role-playing game for iOS and Android devices, titled Chaos Dragon: Konton Senso, which released in 2015.

== Plot ==
The story takes place in Huanli (the Year of Dazzling) 3015. D'natia and Kōran, two countries fighting for supremacy, are causing the world to be torn apart due to the constant war. Amidst the strife is the island country Nil Kamui, which has lost its independence. Red Dragon, the guardian god of Nil Kamui, goes out of control. Will the island country be able to regain its independence?

Chaos Dragon is based on the role-playing fiction project Red Dragon, a story which was created by five notable writers: Gen Urobuchi, Kinoko Nasu, Izuki Kogyoku, Ryōgo Narita, and Simadoriru (member of the Stripe Pattern doujin circle). The results of their tabletop role-playing game sessions over six days created material for a seven-volume light novel series.

== Characters ==
Ibuki (忌ブキ)
Voiced by: Marina Inoue (Japanese); Ryan Reynolds (English)
A descendant of the royal family of Nil Kamui. He is the most pure of heart at the beginning, but learns to accept the consequences of his choices and actions. He has the power granted by the Red Dragon.
Eiha (エィハ)
Voiced by: Miyuki Sawashiro (Japanese); Mary Morgan (English)
Ibuki's guardian who is fused with a demon and companion named Val. She has the desire to protect Ibuki as she has promised to Mashiro. Created by Izuki Kogyoku.
Swallow Cratsvalley (スァロゥ・クラツヴァーリ)
Voiced by: Sōma Saitō (Japanese); Orion Pitts (English)
A member of D'natia's prized Black Dragon Knights. Created by Kinoko Nasu.
Lou Zhenhua (婁 震華)
Voiced by: Maaya Uchida (Japanese); Michelle Rojas (English)
An assassin from a religious organization in Kōran. Created by Gen Urobuchi.
Kaguraba Raihou Gramstahl (禍グラバ・雷鳳・グラムシュタール)
Voiced by: Unshou Ishizuka (Japanese); Mike McFarland (English)
A mysterious immortal trader from the independent city of Haiga. Created by Ryōgo Narita.
Red Dragon (赤の竜)
Voiced by: Houchu Ohtsuka (Japanese); Brad Venable (English)
One of the only seven dragons in the world and the guardian deity of Nil Kamui.
Fugaku (浮ガク)
Voiced by: Kenji Akabane (Japanese); Nick Landis (English)
Ibuki's fellow disciple in kendō.
Hien (緋エン)
Voiced by: Takuya Eguchi (Japanese); Joel McDonald (English)
A boy swordfighter. He lost a little sister who was like his other half, during the Seven-Year War.
Agito Isurugi (阿ギト・イスルギ)
Voiced by: Kouichi Yamadera (Japanese); Dave Trosko (English)
Leader of the revolutionary army.
Mashiro Sagura (真シロ・サグラ)
Voiced by: Nozomi Furuki (Japanese); Jeannie Tirado (English)
A girl who was with Ibuki at an orphanage in Nil Kamui.
Kai (可イ)
Voiced by: Haruka Watanabe (Japanese); Alison Viktorin (English)
Who lived in an orphanage after losing both parents in the Seven-Year War between Nil Kamui and Kōran.
Meryl Sherbet (メリル・シャーベット)
Voiced by: Haruka Terui (Japanese); Caitlin Glass (English)
A follower of Swallow.
Black Dragon (黒の竜)
Voiced by: Jouji Nakata (Japanese); J. Michael Tatum (English)
The guardian dragon of D'natia.
Simeon Tsalikov (シメオン・ツァリコフ)
Voiced by: Keiji Fujiwara (Japanese); Marcus D. Stimac (English)
The leader of the third legion of the Black Dragon Knights. He's ranked 3rd overall among the knights.
Ulrika Ledesma (ウルリーカ・レデスマ)
Voiced by: Aimi (Japanese); Alexis Tipton (English)
The sub-leader of the third legion of the Black Dragon Knights. She's ranked 22nd overall among the knights.
Qisha Tianling (妖剣・七殺天凌)
Voiced by: Tomokazu Seki (Japanese); Eric Vale (English)
A sword that can consume the souls of killers and has the personality of a young man. Lou Zhenhua calls it "Your Highness" and keeps it in a coffin between battles because the blade will bewitch people.
Gakushō (楽紹)
Voiced by: Eriko Matsui (Japanese); Jamie Marchi (English)
A Kōran commander who excels at using the guns developed there.
Kōkaku (紅鶴)
Voiced by: Sayaka Ohara (Japanese); Tia Ballard (English)
A Kōran commander with mechanical body parts for use in battle.
Kurama Kazusa (狗ラマ・カズサ)
Voiced by: Toru Ohkawa (Japanese); Kent Williams (English)
A Kōran soldier who despises the "savage" people of Nil Kamui.
Shoren (雪蓮)
Voiced by: Ryoko Shiraishi (Japanese); Monica Rial (English)
A young girl who takes orders from Lou Zhenhua. She can appear and disappear unexpectedly.
Enumael Meschwitz (エマヌエル・メシュヴィッツ)
Voiced by: Haruo Satō (Japanese); Jeremy Inman (English)
A priest from D'natia.
Hakuei (白叡)
Voiced by: Atsushi Tamaru (Japanese); Justin Briner (English)
The new representative of Kouran's army.
Sol (ソル)
Voiced by: Ryohei Kimura (Japanese); Clifford Chapin (English)
A half-human under the service of Kaguraba.
Shaddy (シャディ)
Voiced by: Aoi Yūki (Japanese); Felecia Angelle (English)
A girl who is also fused with a demon under the service of Kaguraba.
Miska (ミスカ)
Voiced by: Ayaka Imamura (Japanese); Ashleigh Domangue (English)
The owner and driver of a giant elephant.
Inori (祝ノリ)
Voiced by: Chika Anzai (Japanese); Leah Clark (English)
Ibuki's twin sister. She was thought to have been killed with Nil Kamui's previous king during the Seven-Year War. However, she suddenly reappears as D'natia's candidate to be the small country's next ruler.

== Anime ==
=== Episodes ===
No.	Title	Original release date
1	"Kill One to Save Many"; Transliteration: "Issatsutashō" (Japanese: 一殺多生)	July 2, 2015
2	"Antinomy"; Transliteration: "Niritsuhaihan" (Japanese: 二律背反)	July 9, 2015
3	"Three as One"; Transliteration: "Sanmiittai" (Japanese: 三位一体)	July 16, 2015
4	"Amid Enemies"; Transliteration: "Shimensoka" (Japanese: 四面楚歌)	July 23, 2015
5	"In a Fog"; Transliteration: "Gorimuchū" (Japanese: 五里霧中)	July 30, 2015
6	"Six Paths of Transmigration"; Transliteration: "Rokudōrin'ne" (Japanese: 六道輪廻)	August 6, 2015
7	"Ups and Downs in Life"; Transliteration: "Shichitenhakki" (Japanese: 七転八起)	August 13, 2015
8	"Perfect Serenity"; Transliteration: "Hachimenreirō" (Japanese: 八面玲瓏)	August 20, 2015
9	"Winding"; Transliteration: "Tsudzuraori" (Japanese: 九十九折)	August 27, 2015
10	"Narrow Escape from Death"; Transliteration: "Jisshiisshō" (Japanese: 十死一生)	September 3, 2015
11	"Pandemonium"; Transliteration: "Hyakkiyakō" (Japanese: 百鬼夜行)	September 10, 2015
12	"One Chance in a Million"; Transliteration: "Senzaiichigū" (Japanese: 千載一遇)	September 17, 2015
