= Demon Time =

Demon Time may refer to:

== Music ==
=== Albums ===
- Demon Time, a mixtape by Lil Reese (2022)
- Demon Time, an album by Mura Masa (2022)

=== Songs ===
- "Demon Time", a song by Chase Atlantic from Lost in Heaven (2024)
- "Demon Time", a single by Chat Pile (2025)
- "Demon Time", a non-album single by Lil Mabu (2021)
- "Demon Time" (featuring Draft Day), a song by Lil Yachty from Lil Boat 3 (2020)
- "Demon Time", a song by Tony Effe from Icon (2024)
- "Demon Time" (with Ski Mask the Slump God), a song by Trippie Redd from Trip at Knight (2021)

== Other ==
- "Demon Time", chapter 61 of the manga Assassination Classroom
- "On Demon Time", episode 88 of television series Growing Up Hip Hop
