= 咖啡 =

咖啡 or 珈琲 are "coffee" in East Asian languages.

- "Cà Phê" (Chữ Nôm: 咖啡): song by Vietnamese singer Min.
- "Coffee" (珈琲): manga Tokyo Ghoul chapter.
- Kāfēi (咖啡): Coffee in Chinese.
- Keopi (커피): old-stylish writing in "gabae" (가배, 咖啡).
- Kopi (咖啡; Hokkien: ko-pi): Nanyang coffee from Malay.
