= Red Dragon (role-playing fiction) =

Japanese tabletop role-playing fiction and art phenomenon

Red Dragon (Japanese: レッド・ドラゴン) is a Japanese role-playing game, role-playing fiction and art phenomenon.

A series of books based on TRPG replays of the game play have been released.

The creators of Red Dragon include Makoto Sanda, the creator of Rental Magica. Other players include the authors Kinoko Nasu, Ryohgo Narita, and Gen Urobuchi.

== See also ==
- Chaos Dragon, 2015 anime based on Red Dragon.
