= Love in Hell =

Japanese manga series

- Cover of the first manga volume

地獄恋 LOVE in the HELL (じごくれん ラブ イン ザ ヘル) (Jigokuren - Rabu in za Heru)
- Genre: Supernatural, Comedy
- Manga
- Written by: Reiji Suzumaru
- Published by: Futabasha
- English publisher: NA: Seven Seas Entertainment
- Magazine: Web Comic High
- Original run: 2011 – 2013
- Volumes: 3
- Manga

Love in Hell: Death Life
- Written by: Reiji Suzumaru
- Published by: Futabasha
- English publisher: NA: Seven Seas Entertainment
- Imprint: Action Comics
- Original run: 26 March 2015 – January 2017
- Volumes: 2

Love in Hell (地獄恋(じごくれん) LOVE in the HELL(ラブ イン ザ ヘル), Jigokuren - Rabu in za Heru) is a Japanese manga series written and illustrated by Reiji Suzumaru. A spinoff, titled Love in Hell: Death Life (地獄恋(じごくれん) DEATH LIFE(デス ライフ), Jigokuren - Desu Raifu), began in 2015. Both series are published in English by Seven Seas Entertainment.

== Characters ==
Rintaro Senkawa (千川凛太郎, Senkawa Rintaro)
A normal man in his mid-twenties who finds himself in Hell after dying in a drunken accident.
Koyori (こより, Koyori)
A young and attractive female devil whose job is to torture Rintaro for his sins. Rintaro's is the first soul she has dealt with.
Matsubashi
A masochist who will rent out his services and be tortured in others' stead. He manipulates Rintaro into a number of bad situations.
Utsunomiya Sousuke (宇都宮颯介(うつのみやそうすけ), Utsunomiya Sōsuke)
The protagonist of Love in Hell: Death Life, who, like Rintaro, ends up in Hell after his untimely death.
Sanagi (沙凪(さなぎ), Sanagi)
Sousuke's devil guide.

== Release ==
The series, written and illustrated by Reiji Suzumaru, was serialized in Futabasha's seinen magazine Web Comic High! starting in 2011. Three collected volumes were published between 2012 and 2013. A spinoff, originally titled Jigokuren II (地獄恋II), began publication on 26 March 2015. Futabasha changed the title to Jigokuren - Death Life for the tankōbon release.

The series is licensed in North America by Seven Seas Entertainment, who published it in three single volumes followed by a collected omnibus edition. Seven Seas also licensed the spinoff.

=== Volumes ===
No.	Original release date	Original ISBN	English release date	English ISBN
1	12 March 2012	978-4-575-84046-9	15 October 2013	978-1-937867-89-8
1. "First Circle of Hell: Boob Hell"; 2. "Second Circle of Hell: More Boob Hell"; 3. "Third Circle of Hell: Confection Hell"; 4. "Fourth Circle of Hell: Hole Hell"; 5. "Fifth Circle of Hell: Hot Springs Hell"; 6. "Sixth Circle of Hell: Work Hell"
2	12 September 2012	978-4-575-84131-2	21 January 2014	978-1-937867-99-7
7. "Seventh Circle of Hell: Cuckold Hell"; 8. "Eighth Circle of Hell: Sister Complex Hell"; 9. "Ninth Circle of Hell: Skin Hell"; 10. "Tenth Circle of Hell: Runaway Hell"; 11. "Eleventh Circle of Hell: Brain Hell"; 12. "Twelfth Circle of Hell: Vengeance Hell"
3	12 March 2013	978-4-575-84205-0	15 April 2014	978-1-626920-14-9
13. "Thirteenth Circle of Hell: Dress-up Hell"; 14. "Fourteenth Circle of Hell: Facial Hell"; 15. "Fifteenth Circle of Hell: Delivery Hell"; 16. "Sixteenth Circle of Hell: Snack Hell"; 17. "Seventeenth Circle of Hell: Love in Hell (Part I)"; 18. "Final Circle of Hell: Love in Hell (Part II)"

Omnibus

No.	English release date	English ISBN
1	13 October 2015	978-1-626922-03-7

Love in Hell: Death Life

No.	Original release date	Original ISBN	English release date	English ISBN
1	28 September 2015	978-4-575-84696-6	19 July 2016	978-1-626923-09-6
2	7 October 2016	—	10 January 2017	978-1-626923-43-0

== Reception ==
Reviewing the first volume for The Fandom Post, Matthew Alexander called it "a welcome addition to the seinen series with American releases", describing it as "kind of like Sundome meets Genshiken meets Highschool of the Dead, only without zombies", and writing that "there is plenty of nudity, adult jokes, and gory torture to fill many fanboys desires; unless you're a mecha fanboy, then you're out of luck." He gave the story a grade of B+ and the art a B.
