= List of Barakamon chapters =

Barakamon is a Japanese shōnen manga series written and illustrated by Satsuki Yoshino. The story follows Seishū Handa, a calligrapher who is sent to the remote Gotō Islands off the western coast of Kyūshū, and his various interactions with the people of the island.

Barakamon began serialization in Square Enix's Gangan Online February 2009 issue. The first tankōbon volume was released on July 22, 2009; The series was licensed by Yen Press in February 2014, who released the first volume on October 28, 2014.

A spin-off manga, titled Handa-kun, started serialization in Square Enix's Monthly Shonen Gangan magazine starting in the November 2013 issue. It takes place six years prior to Barakamon, focusing on Seishū's life as a high school student. The first tankōbon volume was released June 21, 2014; seven volumes have been released as of September 12, 2016.

== Volumes ==
=== Barakamon ===
No.	Original release date	Original ISBN	English release date	English ISBN
1	July 22, 2009	978-4-7575-2616-7	October 28, 2014	978-0-316-33608-6
Act 1. "Barakakodon" (ばらかこどん, Barakakodon); Act 2. "Yanawa" (やなわっ, Yanawatsu); Act 3. "Donkudon"; Act 3.5. "Hitokkuruma"; Act 4. "Onnankodon"; Act 5. "Sha"; Act 6. "Yosonmon"; Act 6.5. "Gouchou-gai no Mushiko"; Act 7. "Hitonmochi"; Bonus Manga: "Danpo"
2	February 22, 2010	978-4-7575-2796-6	December 16, 2014	978-0-316-33658-1
Act 8. "Moyo"; Act 9. "Konomon"; Act 10. "Che!!"; Act 11. "Kana"; Act 12. "Miseya"; Act 13. "Megane ba Kaketa Ko"; Act 14. "Nemacchoru"; Act 15. "Kengeramon"; Act 16. "Chuu no Waruka"; Act 17. "Osowa"; Act 18. "Un ni Oegii"; Bonus Manga: "Danpo the 2nd"
3	October 22, 2010	978-4-7575-3027-0	February 24, 2015	978-0-316-25943-9
Act 19. "Mina to Gona"; Act 20. "Yumeshi"; Act 21. "Tsukkyo"; Act 22. "Yakamashika"; Act 23. "Hisan-Iwo"; Act 24. "Mata Konkana"; Act 25. "Pooch mo Doshi"; Act 26. "Okazen Kuzzo"; Bonus Manga: "Danpo the 3rd"
4	May 21, 2011	978-4-7575-3229-8	April 21, 2015	978-0-316-34029-8
Act 27. "Misenban"; Act 28. "Kure-Iwo"; Act 29. "Enba"; Act 30. "Kagya...?"; Act 31. "Tohoushinota"; Act 32. "Yuchikasu"; Act 33. "Menoha"; Act 34. "Mottemawa"; Act 35. "Oku"; Act 36. "Onde"; Bonus Manga: "Danpo the 4th"
5	December 22, 2011	978-4-7575-3443-8	June 23, 2015	978-0-316-34031-1
Act 37. "Gippaka Kajja"; Act 38. "Byara"; Act 39. "Okega Makucchi Shita"; Act 40. "Dorotappe Nacchotte"; Act 41. "Aburunna"; Bonus Manga: "Kauka"; Act 42. "Yorokobasudeno"; Act 43. "Ishikodzun"; Act 44. "Dacchi Ikode"; Bonus Manga: "Danpo the 5th"
6	July 21, 2012	978-4-7575-3667-8	August 18, 2015	978-0-316-34033-5
Act 45. "Hanashiai ba Su"; Act 46. "I Am in Tokyo"; Act 47. "From Home"; Act 48. "Kuyashika"; Act 49. "Going Shopping"; Act 50. "listen to What I Say!"; Act 51. "Kaette Kuttochiyo"; Act 52. "Kaettekite Urishika"; Bonus Manga: "Danpo the 6th"
7	March 22, 2013	978-4-7575-3715-6	October 27, 2015	978-0-316-34035-9
Act 53. "Garashido"; Act 54. "Yotatashi kabu"; Act 55. "Shakuren"; Act 56. "Yokagote"; Act 57. "Takumon Waru"; Act 58. "Manda ka na?"; Act 59. "Ukekuro"; Act 60. "Tondaru Utotaru Odottaru"; Bonus Manga: "Danpo the 7th"
8	September 21, 2013	978-4-7575-3958-7	December 15, 2015	978-0-316-34037-3
Act 61. "Amakamon ba Kojjayu"; Act 62. "Orau"; Act 63. "Ukarugote"; Act 64. "The Class Trip"; Act 65. "Abe"; Act 66. "Kichikuru"; Act 67. "Kuyami"; Act 68. "Ookin Jatta ne"; Bonus Manga: "Danpo the 8th"
9	June 21, 2014	978-4-7575-4333-1	February 23, 2016	978-0-316-26999-5
Act 69. "Ontsuan Kaigi"; Act 70. "Gibare Hiroshi"; Act 71. "Modoro ka"; Act 72. "Bunnaguru"; Act 73. "Kodon Kaigi"; Act 74. "Kakekuro"; Bonus Manga: "Danpo the 9th"
10	September 22, 2014	978-4-7575-4413-0	April 26, 2016	978-0-316-39348-5
Act 75. "Sabunatta"; Act 76. "Oyado ga!?"; Act 77. "Hiroshi"; Act 78. "Kita chi ka na"; Act 79. "Asameshi"; Act 80. "Toto to"; Bonus Manga: "Danpo the 10th"
11	May 12, 2015	978-4-7575-4636-3	June 21, 2016	978-0-316-39352-2
Act 81. "Kao Mishiru"; Act 82. "Nukka"; Act 83. "Aburu"; Act 84. "Yasha Tsukuru"; Act 85. "Tamago ba Wattarya"; Act 86. "Deko"; Act 87. "Tako-Toru"; Bonus Manga: "Danpo the 11th"
12	September 12, 2015	978-4-7575-4732-2	October 25, 2016	978-0-316-54544-0
Act 88. "Futo Nare yo"; Act 89. "Kubbai"; Act 90. "12/24"; Act 91. "The 25th"; Act 92. "The 26th"; Act 92.5. "One Cold Day"; Act 93. "Toshi no Ban"; Bonus Manga: "Danpo the 12th"; Bonus Manga: "Danpo the 12th #2"
13	March 12, 2016	978-4-7575-4905-0	March 21, 2017	978-0-316-55313-1
Act 94. "We're Going to Tokyo!"; Act 95. "Helping Out"; Act 96. "The Zoo"; Act 97. "Kousuke wa Himason Shicho"; Act 98. "Watching My Father at Work"; Act 99. "Going Home?"; Act 100. "Korukaru"; Bonus Manga: "Danpo the 13th"
14	December 12, 2016	978-4-7575-5179-4	September 19, 2017	978-0-316-51121-6
Act 101. "Ie no Uchi Kita"; Act 102. "Dekon To"; Act 103. "Okkakekuro"; Act 104. "Hiroshi-gai de"; Act 105. "Sabushite"; Act 106. "Miwa-gai"; Act 107. "Shishikoma"; Bonus Manga: "Danpo the 14th"
15	June 12, 2017	978-4-7575-5241-8	March 13, 2018	978-0-316-41603-0
Act 108. "Chittoka Konmon"; Act 109. "Nukka"; Act 110. "Sauka"; Act 111. "Chichikoi yo"; Act 112. "Kodomya Ishhi Shichoran"; Act 113.Onin Oran Uchi; Act 114. "Choco ba"; Bonus Manga: "Danpo the 15th"
16	December 12, 2017	978-4-7575-5433-7	September 25, 2018	978-1-9753-0169-9
Act 115. "Hiroshi Graduates"; Act 116. "Toretaeta"; Act 117. "Komakuroshika"; Act 118. "Totodon"; Act 119. "Yattattotta"; Act 120. "Un ni Orabu"; Act 121. "Itekoi Hiroshi"; Bonus Manga: "Danpo the 16th"
17	June 12, 2018	978-4-7575-5617-1	February 19, 2019	978-1-9753-0304-4
Act 122. "Sewa de Sewa de"; Act 123. "Atesu"; Act 124. "Banbe"; Act 125. "Shaberukakuru"; Act 126. "Ika ba Tsurogocha"; Act 127. "Sakuran Hanan Sejoru"; Bonus Manga: "Danpo the 17th"
18	December 12, 2018	978-4-7575-5938-7	August 20, 2019	978-1-9753-5818-1
Act 128. "Hitochifu to Natta"; Act 129. "Fundashi"; Act 130. "Manga ba Kakutochita"; Act 131. "April 15"; Act 132. "Oru ga Ossei"; Act 133. "Ogga Ichinchi"; Act 134. "Ooba na Asuda ne"
19	July 12, 2023	978-4-7575-8661-1	—	—

=== Handa-kun ===
No.	Original release date	Original ISBN	English release date	English ISBN
1	June 21, 2014	978-4-7575-4333-1	February 23, 2016	978-0-316-26918-6
2	September 22, 2014	978-4-7575-4412-3	April 26, 2016	978-0-316-31482-4
3	January 22, 2015	978-4-7575-4534-2	June 21, 2016	978-0-316-27229-2
4	August 12, 2015	978-4-7575-4711-7	October 25, 2016	978-0-316-39787-2
5	February 12, 2016	978-4-7575-4877-0	March 21, 2017	978-0-316-46927-2
6	July 12, 2016	978-4-7575-5047-6	June 20, 2017	978-0-316-47165-7
7	September 12, 2016	978-4-7575-5094-0	September 19, 2017	978-0-316-47340-8
