= My Girlfriend Is a T-Rex =

Japanese manga series

- The cover of the first manga volume, featuring Yuuma (left) and Churio (right)

T-REXな彼女 (T-Rex na Kanojo)
- Genre: Romance, Comedy
- Manga
- Written by: Sanzo
- Published by: Kadokawa
- English publisher: NA: Seven Seas Entertainment
- Magazine: Gene Pixiv
- Original run: 27 October 2014 – December 2015
- Volumes: 2
- icon

My Girlfriend Is a T-Rex (T-REXな彼女, T-Rex na Kanojo) is a Japanese manga series written and illustrated by Sanzo. The series is published in English by Seven Seas Entertainment.

== Plot ==
Yuuma, a normal human, begins dating an anthropomorphic Tyrannosaurus rex named Churio, and must deal with the problems that dating a humanoid dinosaur entails.

== Characters ==
Yuuma Asahikawa (旭川優真, Asahikawa Yūma)
Churio's boyfriend and the series' protagonist.

Churio (チュリオ)
An anthropomorphic Tyrannosaurus rex with a ravenous appetite.

== Release ==
Sanzo launched the series in Kadokawa's online magazine Gene Pixiv (a collaboration between Monthly Comic Gene and Pixiv) on 27 October 2014. Seven Seas Entertainment announced their license to the series in December 2015, with plans to begin publishing it in North America in November 2016.

=== Volumes ===
No.	Original release date	Original ISBN	English release date	English ISBN
01	27 May 2015	978-4-04-067641-8	1 November 2016	978-1-626923-36-2
1. Hajime Mashite na Kanojo (初めましてな彼女); 2. Ame no Hi no Kanojo (雨の日の彼女); 3. Monchaku na Kanojo (悶着な彼女); 4. Gāruzutōku na Kanojo (ガールズトークな彼女); 5. Suketto na Kanojo (助っ人な彼女); 6. O Ryōri na Kanojo (お料理な彼女); 7. Fukigen na Kanojo (不機嫌な彼女); 8. Battari na Kanojo (バッタリな彼女); 9. Meromero na Kanojo (メロメロな彼女); 10. Shin Seikatsu na Kanojo (新生活な彼女); 11. Hatsu Shukkin na Kanojo (初出勤な彼女); 12. Kuro Rekishi? na Kareshi (黒歴史? な彼氏); 13. Dai Sōji na Kanojo (大掃除な彼女)
02	27 February 2016	978-4-04-068134-4	17 January 2017	978-1-626923-88-1
14. Bunmeikaika na Kanojo (文明開化な彼女); 15. Tsukisoi na Kanojo (付き添いな彼女); 16. Joshikai? na Kanojo (女子会? な彼女); 17. Otonari-san na Kanojo (お隣さんな彼女); 18. Kajiritsuki na Kanojo (かじりつきな彼女); 19. Tsubasa Ryū to Umi to Gake na Kanojo (翼竜と海と崖な彼女); 20. Natsu Matsuri na Kanojo (夏祭りな彼女); 21. O Kan Muri na Kanojo (おかんむりな彼女); 22. O Mimai na Kanojo (お見舞いな彼女); 23. Hogosha na Kanojo (保護者な彼女); 24. Purezento Erabi na Kanojo (プレゼント選びな彼女); 25. Imechen na Kanojo (イメチェンな彼女); 26. Shinpai na Kanojo (心配な彼女); 27. Onnanoko na Kanojo (女の子な彼女)
