= List of Attack on Titan chapters =

First volume of Attack on Titan, released in Japan by Kodansha on March 17, 2010

Attack on Titan is a Japanese manga series written and illustrated by Hajime Isayama. The story is set in a world where humanity lives inside cities surrounded by enormous walls due to the Titans, gigantic humanoid creatures who devour humans seemingly without reason. The story centers around Eren Yeager, alongside his childhood friends, Mikasa Ackerman and Armin Arlert, whose lives are changed forever after the appearance of a Colossus Titan brings about the destruction of their home town and the death of Eren's mother. Vowing revenge and to reclaim the world from the Titans, Eren, Mikasa and Armin join the Survey Corps, an elite group of soldiers who fight Titans outside the walls.

The series began serialization in Kodansha's monthly publication Bessatsu Shōnen Magazine in its October 2009 issue and ended in its May 2021 issue. The first tankōbon volume was released in March 2010, and the 34th and final volume was released in June 2021. In North America, the series is published in English by Kodansha USA, that first published the first volume on June 19, 2012, with a three or four-month interval between each release until mid-2013, when subsequent volumes started being released on a monthly basis to catch up faster with the original Japanese releases, which they did at the end of that year, subsequently returning to the previous schedule. The series has also been adapted into an anime television series by IG Port's Wit Studio (seasons 1 to 3) and MAPPA (season 4), with the first episode airing on April 7, 2013, on MBS. The anime is also being streamed by both Funimation and Crunchyroll on their respective websites.

== Manga ==
=== Attack on Titan ===
Chapters in the Kodansha USA publications are numbered as episodes.

No.	Original release date	Original ISBN	English release date	English ISBN
1	March 17, 2010	978-4-06-384276-0	June 19, 2012	978-1-61262-024-4
1. "To You, 2,000 Years from Now" (二千年後の君へ, Ni Sen Nen Go no Kimi e); 2. "That Day" (その日, Sono Hi); 3. "Night of the Disbanding Ceremony" (解散式の夜, Kaisanshiki no Yoru); 4. "First Battle" (初陣, Uijin)
With the advent of giant humanoid beings known as "Titans" that hunt and eat humans on sight, mankind quickly dwindles in numbers and its territory is reduced to a small country protected by three massive walls: Wall Maria, Wall Rose and Wall Sheena that kept the Titans outside for a hundred years, until a Colossal Titan (and an Armored one) breach the fortified city of Shiganshina. The territory between Wall Maria and Wall Rose is overrun by the Titans, claiming tens of thousands of lives. After his mother is killed in the attack, Eren Yeager, one of the survivors of Shiganshina, joins the army along with his foster sister Mikasa Ackerman and childhood friend Armin Arlert. After completing their training, Eren, Mikasa and Armin are stationed at the city of Trost when the Colossus Titan appears before them once more and breaches its wall for an invasion by the other Titans. To rescue Armin, Eren gets swallowed by a Titan.
2	July 16, 2010	978-4-06-384338-5	September 11, 2012	978-1-61262-025-1
5. "A Dull Glow in the Midst of Despair" (絶望の中で鈍く光る, Zetsubō no Naka de Nibuku Hikaru); 6. "The World that the Girl Saw" (少女が見た世界, Shōjo ga Mita Sekai); 7. "Small Blade" (小さな刃, Chiisa na Yaiba); 8. "Roar" (咆哮, Hōkō); 9. "The Beating of a Heart Can Be Heard" (心臓の鼓動が聞こえる, Shinzō no Kodō ga Kikoeru)
While protecting Armin from a Titan, Eren is swallowed, leading his friends to believe he is dead. Mikasa recalls her past when her parents were killed but she was saved by Eren. When the soldiers are about to lose hope, a mysterious rogue titan appears and starts attacking and killing the other Titans. After making use of this distraction to regroup and resupply, they watch the rogue Titan collapse from exhaustion and are surprised to see an unharmed Eren emerge from its body.
3	December 9, 2010	978-4-06-384410-8	December 4, 2012	978-1-61262-026-8
Side Story: "Captain Levi" (リヴァイ兵士長, Rivai Heishichō); 10. "Where's the Left Arm?" (左腕の行方, Hidariude no Yukue); 11. "Response" (応える, Kotaeru); 12. "Icon" (偶像, Gūzō); 13. "Wound" (傷, Kizu)
News of Eren's amazing transformation brings conflict to the army between those who want Eren dead and those who want to make use of his power to help them recapture the city. In the end, Eren is spared and entrusted with the task of sealing the hole in the wall with a massive rock he is able to carry with the strength of his Titan form. However, during the operation, Eren suddenly goes berserk and his friends attempt to calm him down and help him regain control over the large Titan body he summoned.
4	April 8, 2011	978-4-06-384469-6	March 26, 2013	978-1-61262-253-8
14. "Primitive Desire" (原初的欲求, Genshoteki Yokkyū); 15. "One by One" (個々, Koko); 16. "Necessity" (必要, Hitsuyō); 17. "Delusions of Strength" (武力幻想, Buryoku Gensō); 18. "What Should I Do Now?" (今、何をすべきか, Ima, Nani o Subeki ka)
Recovering his conscience, Eren carries his task to the end and helps the human army attain their first victory against the Titans. The story then depicts the events two years prior when Eren and his companions joined the military and began their training as part of the 104th Training Corps.
5	August 9, 2011	978-4-06-384513-6	June 4, 2013	978-1-61262-254-5
Side Story: "Ilse's Notebook" (イルゼの手帳, Iruze no Techō); 19. "Still Can't See" (まだ目を見れない, Mada Me o Mirenai); 20. "Special Operations Squad" (特別作戦班, Tokubetsu Sakusen Han); 21. "Opening the Gate" (開門, Kaimon); 22. "Long-Distance Enemy Scouting Formation" (長距離索敵陣形, Chōkyori Sakuteki Jinkei)
Back to the present, Eren is brought into a military court to decide his fate. Between the opposing views of those who brand him as a threat and want him dead, and those who want to make use of his power to reclaim Wall Maria, it is decided that Eren will be put under care of the Survey Corps Special Task Force, led by Levi, the man known as the army's strongest soldier. Soon after, the Survey Corps led by Levi's superior Commander Erwin Smith organizes an expedition through the Titans territory, bringing Eren and the other newcomers with them.
6	December 9, 2011	978-4-06-384591-4	August 27, 2013	978-1-61262-255-2
23. "The Female Titan" (女型の巨人, Megata no Kyojin); 24. "The Titan Forest" (巨大樹の森, Kyodaiju no Mori); 25. "Bite" (噛みつく, Kamitsuku); 26. "The Easy Path" (好都合な道を, Kōtsugō na Michi o)
The expedition is attacked by a huge Titan with female-like features. Figuring that its target is Eren, Levi and his soldiers take him to a dense forest where the soldiers had previously laid a trap, using it to capture the Female Titan. Levi entices the Titan into the trap by performing a special technique which enables expedition members to temporarily stun enemies without the lethal blow to the neck typically necessary to defeat Titans.
7	April 9, 2012	978-4-06-384652-2; 978-4-06-362208-9 (limited edition)	September 24, 2013	978-1-61262-256-9
27. "Erwin Smith" (エルヴィン・スミス, Eruvin Sumisu); 28. "Choices and Consequences" (選択と結果, Sentaku to Kekka); 29. "Crushing Blow" (鉄槌, Tettsui); 30. "Losers" (敗者達, Haisha Tachi)
The Female Titan breaks free by calling titans over, which quickly consume it despite the efforts of the scouts. Erwin deduces that the Female Titan is not dead but the user used the titans as a distraction to escape. The Female Titan then intercepts Eren and Levi's squad and attempts to kidnap him, killing the squad in the process. In outrage, Eren transforms but is quickly defeated by the Female Titan which captures him in her mouth. Before it can escape, Mikasa, aided by Levi, arrive and incapacitate the Female Titan before rescuing Eren. Having failed to discover the enemy's identity despite suffering heavy casualties, the Survey Corps return home and are ordered to hand over Eren to the Military Police.
8	August 9, 2012	978-4-06-384712-3; 978-4-06-362227-0 (limited edition)	October 29, 2013	978-1-61262-547-8
31. "Grin" (微笑み, Hohoemi); 32. "Mercy" (慈悲, Jihi); 33. "Wall" (壁, Kabe); 34. "Soldiers Dance" (戦士は踊る, Senshi wa Odoru)
Stationed in a Military Police base in the Stohess District, Annie Leonhart, an old acquaintance of Eren and his friends from their training days, is asked by Armin to assist him with a plan to help Eren escape. However, it was all a plot to expose her as the Female Titan who attacked the expedition. After failing to capture Eren once again, Annie attempts to escape by climbing through Wall Sheena only to be stopped by her former companions and encases herself into an indestructible, crystal-like structure to protect herself. The damage Annie dealt to the walls reveals that there are live Titans entombed inside them, but Eren's friends are forbidden to inquire further about this. As Mikasa and Armin tend to an exhausted Eren, the rest of their friends discover that Titans have breached Wall Rose.
9	December 7, 2012	978-4-06-384776-5; 978-4-06-362239-3 (limited edition)	November 26, 2013	978-1-61262-548-5
35. "The Beast Titan" (獣の巨人, Kemono no Kyojin); 36. "I'm Home" (ただいま, Tadaima); 37. "Southwestward" (南西へ, Nansei e); 38. "Utgard Castle" (ウトガルド城, Utogarudo-jō)
The Survey Corps fight a group of Titans that have breached Wall Rose. A beast-like Titan, who is able to speak, kills their squad leader Mike by commanding the other Titans. The Survey Corps divide into groups to inform the nearby villages of the attack and identify the breach in the wall. Sasha visits her home town which has been lost to the Titans, rescues a young girl from a Titan, and reunites with her father. On the way to Ehrmich District, Hange comes up with an idea to re-seal the wall using Eren's Titan form. A minister of the country's major religion, who worships the walls and apparently knew of the Titans within them, reveals that one of the Survey Corps members holds the key to the secret of the walls. Connie discovers his village was destroyed by Titans, yet no blood was shed; he is surprised when one of the Titans there speaks to him. The soldiers converge, without having found a breach. They take shelter at the nearby Castle Utgard, but their camp is surrounded by Titans when the full moon rises.
10	April 9, 2013	978-4-06-384839-7; 978-4-06-362243-0 (limited edition)	December 31, 2013	978-1-61262-676-5
39. "Soldier" (兵士, Heishi); 40. "Ymir" (ユミル, Yumiru); 41. "Historia" (ヒストリア, Hisutoria); 42. "Warrior" (戦士, Senshi)
The Survey Corps team are trapped inside Castle Utgard fighting the Titans. Reiner and Bertolt fight off one that penetrated the tower, but Reiner gets bitten by one of the Titans. As the Beast Titan summons more Titans, Ymir reveals to Krista that she too can transform into a Titan, and uses this power to fend off the attackers. Eren, Mikasa and the others arrive to rescue them as dawn breaks. Krista reveals her real name: Historia Reiss, an illegitimate child within the royal lineage. While Hange speculates how the Titans could have entered without breaching the wall, Reiner and Bertolt unexpectedly reveal to Eren that they are the Armored and Colossus Titans. They attempt to persuade Eren to join their cause, but Eren flies into a rage and they all turn into Titans to fight each other.
11	August 9, 2013	978-4-06-394901-8; 978-4-06-362256-0 (special edition)	January 28, 2014	978-1-61262-677-2
43. "The Armored Titan" (鎧の巨人, Yoroi no Kyojin); 44. "Strike, Throw, Submit" (打・投・極, Da Tō Kyoku); 45. "The Hunters" (追う者, Ou Mono); 46. "Opening" (開口, Kaikō)
Face to face with those responsible for the fall of Shiganshina, Eren transforms and fights Reiner's Armored Titan, while the Colossus Titan defends himself against the others. Using tactics he learned from sparring with Annie and some advice from Mikasa, he defeats the Armored Titan, but the Colossus Titan drops on him from atop the wall and incapacitates the other soldiers. Ymir and Eren are captured. Five hours later, Mikasa and the others awake from the shock and rendezvous with Erwin and the others, who organize a party to chase after them.
12	December 9, 2013	978-4-06-394976-6; 978-4-06-358465-3 (limited edition)	April 29, 2014	978-1-61262-678-9
47. "Children" (子供達, Kodomo Tachi); 48. "Someone" (誰か, Dareka); 49. "Charge" (突撃, Totsugeki); 50. "Scream" (叫び, Sakebi)
Reiner and Bertolt convince Ymir to join their side, claiming that they can ensure both her and Krista's safety, but Eren remains intent on revenge against the two guys. While Ymir and Eren heal in the forest of Titans, their rescue party approaches. Ymir transforms and captures Krista. Reiner transforms into the Armored Titan and carries Ymir, Bertolt and Eren while the rescue party pursues them. Amid the chaos of the battle, Eren finds himself against the same Titan who killed his mother. He discovers much to his surprise that he has the power to command other Titans to do his bidding (an ability Reiner refers to as "the Coordinate"), using it to avenge his mother and drive Reiner and Bertolt away. Eren and his friends then return home safely, but Ymir parts with Krista and allies with Reiner and Bertolt, who retreat outside the walls.
13	April 9, 2014	978-4-06-395044-1; 978-4-06-358488-2 (limited edition)	August 26, 2014	978-1-61262-679-6
51. "Squad Levi" (リヴァイ班, Rivai Han); 52. "Krista Lenz" (クリスタ・レンズ, Kurisuta Renzu); 53. "Smoke Signal" (狼煙, Noroshi); 54. "Location of the Counterattack" (反撃の場所, Hangeki no Basho)
The Survey Corps take Eren and Krista, who now assumes her birth name, Historia Reiss, to a secluded place and make preparations for an eventual operation to reclaim Wall Maria. Hange proposes the theory that all regular Titans were humans once, but after the transformation they became feral and unable to return to their original form, unlike Eren and the other intelligent Titans. When Levi and his subordinates uncover a conspiracy to hinder their efforts led by none other than the royalty itself, Erwin and his supporters decide to stage a revolution to ensure that their plans to drive away the Titans from the walls can be executed without further interference.
14	August 8, 2014	978-4-06-395141-7; 978-4-06-358703-6 (limited edition)	November 4, 2014	978-1-61262-680-2
55. "Pain" (痛み, Itami); 56. "Actors" (役者, Yakusha); 57. "Kenny the Ripper" (切り裂きケニー, Kirisaki Kenī); 58. "Gunshots" (銃声, Jūsei)
After learning that the current king is just a figurehead to Historia's father, Rod Reiss, who is the true ruler inside the walls, Erwin and the others decide to use her to overthrow the current monarchy and install her as queen. To draw the attention of their enemies, Eren and Historia pose themselves as bait, but they are outsmarted and instead captured by Captain Kenny Ackerman, a former serial killer and old mentor of Levi. Levi and the others then attempt to rescue their friends but Kenny and his special forces, who are equipped with special gear tailored to hunt down humans instead of Titans, appear to stop them.
15	December 9, 2014	978-4-06-395253-7; 978-4-06-358722-7 (limited edition)	March 17, 2015	978-1-61262-979-7
59. "Soul of a Heretic" (外道の魂, Gedō no Tamashii); 60. "Trust" (信頼, Shinrai); 61. "Reply" (回答, Kaitō); 62. "Sin" (罪, Tsumi)
Levi and the others escape from Kenny's troops, but Erwin is captured and sentenced to death. However, false rumors spread by his supporters about a breach on Wall Rose by the Titans expose the nobility's unwillingness to protect its own subjects, leading the army to revolt against them. Meanwhile, Eren's friends prepare to rescue him from captivity in a cave by the true monarch, Historia's father Rod Reiss. Rod forcibly brings back Eren's repressed memories of his father Grisha, revealing that he had been a Titan all along and used his power to massacre the royal family on the day of the fall of Wall Maria, stealing the power of the Founding Titan which they possessed. After this, he turned Eren into a Titan and allowed Eren to eat him, thus granting Eren the Coordinate power of the Founding Titan and transferring Grisha's memories to him.
16	April 9, 2015	978-4-06-395358-9; 978-4-06-358723-4 (limited edition)	August 25, 2015	978-1-61262-980-3; 978-1-63236-186-8 (special edition)
63. "Chains" (鎖, Kusari); 64. "Welcome Party" (歓迎会, Kangeikai); 65. "Dreams and Curses" (夢と呪い, Yume to Noroi); 66. "Wish" (願い, Negai)
The Survey Corps confront Kenny's forces to rescue Eren and Historia, while Rod attempts to convince his daughter to transform into a Titan herself and absorb Eren's powers by eating him. Since only those with royal blood can use the Founding Titan's Coordinate, it is useless as long as Eren has it, but Rod claims Historia could use it to control the Titans. Despite Eren's willingness to sacrifice himself in atonement for her family's death at his father's hands, Historia realizes that no royal has ever put a stop to the threat of Titans before, leading her to doubt Rod's story. Rod admits the royal family is bound by a vow of peace their first king had made, which restricts them from putting an end to the Titans. Historia refuses to become a Titan and Rod decides to do it in her place. However, Rod's new Titan form grows to a massive size, larger than the Colossus Titan itself, and in a desperate move to save his friends from being crushed by the collapsing cave, Eren consumes a vial of Titan fluid that allows him to harden his Titan form.
17	August 7, 2015	978-4-06-395446-3; 978-4-06-362303-1 (limited edition)	December 15, 2015	978-1-63236-112-7; 978-1-63236-282-7 (special edition)
67. "Outside the Walls of Orvud District" (オルブド区外壁, Orubudo-ku Gaiheki); 68. "Ruler of the Walls" (壁の王, Kabe no Ō); 69. "Friends" (友人, Yūjin); 70. "A Dream I Once Had" (いつか見た夢, Itsuka Mita Yume)
The Survey Corps confronts Rod at the walls of Orvud District, ultimately winning when Historia takes advantage of an opening provided by Eren to slay her own father and uses this to present herself as a heroine in order to bolster her authority as the new ruler within the walls. Kenny tells Levi of his friendship with Rod's deceased younger brother Uri and entrusts him with a vial of Titan serum he stole from Rod. Historia is crowned queen, but she relinquishes all authority to the military and dedicates her life to raising orphans. Afterwards, Erwin and the others make preparations to launch a campaign to seal the breach in Shiganshina using Eren's new hardening power and reclaim Wall Maria. Eren remembers that Keith Shadis, the man who trained him and his friends when they joined the military, was a friend of his father's, and decides to pay a visit to him in search for answers. Meanwhile in Shiganshina, the Beast Titan is seen in his human form, and commands Reiner and Bertolt to prepare an ambush for Eren and the others, certain that they will eventually appear there.
18	December 9, 2015	978-4-06-395549-1; 978-4-06-358783-8 (limited edition)	April 5, 2016	978-1-63236-211-7; 978-1-63236-322-0 (special edition)
71. "Bystander" (傍観者, Bōkansha); 72. "Night of the Battle to Retake the Wall" (奪還作戦の夜, Dakkan Sakusen no Yoru); 73. "The Town Where Everything Began" (はじまりの街, Hajimari no Machi); 74. "Mission Objectives" (作戦成功条件, Sakusen Seikō Jōken)
Eren and his friends confront Shadis and hear what he knows about Eren's father and the night of his death. After that, the Survey Corps depart to Shiganshina, where Eren uses his new hardening power to seal the hole made by the Colossus Titan five years prior as part of their plan to retake the city and Wall Maria from the Titans. However, the Beast Titan launches an attack on them, assisted by Reiner and a legion of Titans under his control, while Bertolt lays low, waiting for his time to strike.
19	April 8, 2016	978-4-06-395636-8; 978-4-06-362328-4 (limited edition)	August 2, 2016	978-1-63236-259-9; 978-1-63236-323-7 (special edition)
75. "War on Two Fronts" (二つの戦局, Futatsu no Senkyoku); 76. "The Thunder Spears" (雷槍, Raisō); 77. "The World They Saw" (彼らが見た世界, Karera ga Mita Sekai); 78. "Descent" (光臨, Kōrin)
Eren and his friends confront Reiner and defeat him using a new weapon, the "Thunder Spear", designed specifically to penetrate his Titan's armor. With his friend in trouble, Bertolt joins the battle and transforms into the Colossus Titan, eliminating a large number of the Survey Corps in the process.
20	August 9, 2016	978-4-06-395720-4; 978-4-06-362335-2 (limited edition)	December 27, 2016	978-1-63236-309-1; 978-1-63236-454-8 (special edition)
79. "Perfect Game" (完全試合, Pāfekuto Gēmu); 80. "The Unknown Soldiers" (名も無き兵士, Na mo Naki Heishi); 81. "Promise" (約束, Yakusoku); 82. "Hero" (勇者, Yūsha)
To break the enemy encirclement, Erwin launches a suicide attack with the remaining Survey Corps members in order to distract the Beast Titan and allow Levi to flank him and his forces. The Beast Titan's forces are defeated, but he manages to escape and Erwin is mortally wounded. Meanwhile, Armin distracts Bertolt long enough for Eren to defeat him, but his body is entirely burned by the Colossus Titan's steam in the process, while their friends defeat and capture Reiner.
21	December 9, 2016	978-4-06-395815-7; 978-4-06-362347-5 (limited edition)	April 25, 2017	978-1-63236-327-5
83. "Cleaver" (大鉈, Ōnata); 84. "Midnight Sun" (白夜, Byakuya); 85. "The Basement" (地下室, Chikashitsu); 86. "That Day" (あの日, Ano Hi)
Zeke, the Beast Titan, rescues Reiner and flees, while the few survivors of the Survey Corps clash between saving Erwin or Armin, who are both on the brink of death. Levi, who has the authority to use the single dose of Titan serum given to him by Kenny, initially wishes to save Erwin but ultimately chooses Armin so that Erwin can rest in peace. Armin transforms into a Titan and eats Bertolt, in the process recovering his human form and inheriting the power of the Colossus Titan, while Erwin passes away. With Shiganshina secured, Eren and the others recover his father's diaries which reveal that mankind beyond the walls has not been wiped out by Titans as the government had led them to believe, but is thriving instead. Grisha's writing explains that all those within the walls are of a race known as Eldians, of whom most are the 'Subjects of Ymir' capable of transforming into Titans, and are oppressed outside the walls by a nation called Marley in retribution for having once allegedly dominated the world using the Titans. Grisha had lived in an Eldian ghetto in Marley; he married Dina Fritz, a woman secretly descended from the same Eldian royalty as the royal family within the walls. Together they tried to stage a rebellion against Marley, but they and their companions were betrayed by Grisha and Dina's son, Zeke, whom Grisha had attempted to use as a double agent by placing him in the Marleyan "Warrior" program of Eldian Titans.
22	April 7, 2017	978-4-06-395909-3; 978-4-06-362355-0 (limited edition)	August 1, 2017	978-1-63236-425-8
87. "Borderline" (境界線, Kyōkaisen); 88. "The Attack Titan" (進撃の巨人, Shingeki no Kyojin); 89. "Meeting" (会議, Kaigi); 90. "To the Other Side of the Wall" (壁の向こう側へ, Kabe no Mukōgawa e)
After Zeke's betrayal, the revolutionaries were tortured and taken to Paradis Island, where the walls are situated, and Grisha's wife and allies are transformed into Pure Titans. Eren Kruger, an Eldian ally of the restorationists known as "Owl", who had been undercover within the Marleyan military, transforms into the Attack Titan and destroys all the Marley forces on the island. Kruger states that he will soon die due to having possessed this power for thirteen years and passes it on to Grisha by having Grisha become a Titan and eat him. In the present, upon receiving Grisha's memories, Eren realizes that the Titan who killed his mother was actually Dina, and that the same "Curse of Ymir" which would have killed Kruger affects all people with the power of the Titans. (This means Eren has less than a decade to live.) Meanwhile, Historia receives a letter from Ymir, in which Ymir says she has no regrets and thanks Historia for the time they spent together. After disclosing all the information obtained from Grisha's documents to the public, the new government authorizes the effort to clear and reclaim Wall Maria from the Titans. Eren realizes that he gained the ability to use the Coordinate when he was in contact with Dina, a member of the royal family turned into a Pure Titan; he keeps this to himself, fearing that Historia might be turned into a Titan so that he could use it again. A year later, the Survey Corps has managed to eliminate the remaining Titans from the island and reaches the shore, seeing the ocean for the first time. However, Eren notes that they still have enemies remaining on the other side of the ocean.
23	August 9, 2017	978-4-06-510100-1; 978-4-06-510007-3 (limited edition)	December 19, 2017	978-1-63236-463-0
91. "The Other Side of the Ocean" (海の向こう側, Umi no Mukōgawa); 92. "Marley's Soldiers" (マーレの戦士, Māre no Senshi); 93. "Midnight Train" (闇夜の列車, Yamiyo no Ressha); 94. "The Boy Inside the Walls" (壁の中の少年, Kabe no Naka no Shōnen)
Across the ocean from Paradis, four years after the battle at Shiganshina, the Marley army is fighting a war against the Mid-East Allied Forces, who are using Marley's loss of the Colossus and Female Titans as a chance to attack. Zeke, Reiner and the other Eldian Warriors turn the tide and achieve victory for Marley. To dissuade further attacks and buy time to develop military technology in a global arms race, they must obtain the power of the Founding Titan held by Eren. However, they've received no intelligence on Paradis in the last four years, all of their naval expeditions to the island having disappeared. A dispute arises among the young Warriors about which of them will inherit the Armored Titan; among the candidates are Reiner's daredevil cousin Gabi Braun and empathetic Falco Grice. Reiner reminisces about his youth and what he endured to become selected, and decides he doesn't want Gabi to follow in his footsteps.
24	December 8, 2017	978-4-06-510548-1; 978-4-06-397047-0 (limited edition)	April 10, 2018	978-1-63236-535-4
95. "Liar" (嘘つき, Usotsuki); 96. "The Door of Hope" (希望の扉, Kibō no Tobira); 97. "From One Hand to Another" (手から手へ, Te kara Te e); 98. "Good to See" (よかったな, Yokatta na)
Zeke explains to the Warriors that Marley is launching another strike at Paradis to reclaim the Founding Titan. Gabi notes that Reiner is troubled and that she is likely to inherit his memories if she becomes the next Armored Titan, leading him to recall events of his mission to Paradis. Marcel Galliard claimed to have sabotaged his brother Porco in the selection process so that Reiner was chosen instead. Marcel was then eaten by the Pure Titan form of Ymir (who has since been eaten by Porco, granting him the power of the Jaw Titan) and they consider aborting the mission, but Reiner is terrified of returning in failure. He assumes Marcel's role as leader as they breach Wall Maria and infiltrate the military. Overcome by these memories, Reiner contemplates suicide. The Marleyans plan to announce their Paradis campaign to the world at a festival planned by the Tybur family. The Tyburs are Eldians who control the Warhammer Titan and were the first to turn against the Founding Titan in the ancient Marley–Eldia war, earning them status as honorary Marleyans. As they have not taken part in Marley's recent wars, they bear no animosity from other nations of the world. Charismatic Willy Tybur, who secretly controls the Marleyan government, holds the festival in the Eldian ghetto of Liberio to rally international support for the invasion of Paradis. Just before the main event is about to begin, Falco leads Reiner under a nearby apartment block to meet a crippled soldier he'd befriended, who turns out to be Eren.
25	April 9, 2018	978-4-06-511201-4; 978-4-06-397048-7 (limited edition)	July 3, 2018	978-1-63236-613-9
99. "Guilty Shadow" (疾しき影, Yamashiki Kage); 100. "Declaration of War" (宣戦布告, Sensen Fukoku); 101. "The War Hammer Titan" (戦鎚の巨人, Sentsui no Kyojin); 102. "Too Little, Too Late" (後の祭り, Ato no Matsuri)
Willy Tybur recounts the secret history of the Paradis Eldians, how King Fritz ended the Great Titan War by making a vow of peace, which became jeopardized when Eren stole the power of the Founding Titan, and for the first time the Titans within the walls became a real threat to the world. Eren seemingly offers Reiner sympathy for his actions in Paradis, causing Reiner to break down and beg Eren to kill him. As Willy declares war on Paradis to fulfil his wish for world peace, Eren transforms into the Attack Titan and consumes Willy, then massacres Marley's military command and many civilians. However, Willy's sister inherited the Warhammer Titan and nearly defeats Eren, only to be fought off by the Scouts. Eren realizes the Warhammer's weakness, but is unable to fully exploit it. The Warhammer, Jaw, Cart, and Beast Titans face off against Eren and the Scouts.
26	August 9, 2018	978-4-06-512183-2; 978-4-06-397049-4 (limited edition)	December 4, 2018	978-1-63236-654-2
103. "Assault" (強襲, Kyōshū); 104. "Victors" (勝者, Shōsha); 105. "Assassin's Bullet" (凶弾, Kyōdan); 106. "Brave Volunteers" (義勇兵, Giyūhei)
Reiner transforms into the Armored Titan to save Falco from the collapsing building, but lacks the will to otherwise act. Eren is unable to break the crystal surrounding the Warhammer Titan's controller. Armin uses the Colossus Titan to destroy the Marlyan fleet and port. Levi knocks down the Beast Titan while the Scouts defeat the Cart Titan. Mikasa and Eren defeat the Jaw Titan, and Eren uses its teeth to crush the crystal encasing the Warhammer Titan's controller, consuming her. Reiner interrupts Eren from eating Porco, and Eren decides to withdraw rather than risking more lives protecting him. The Scouts withdraw to a stolen airship commanded by Hange. Gabi and Falco infiltrate the airship, killing Sasha before they are taken captive. They are shocked to see Zeke on board, having betrayed Marley to Paradis. Eren is criticized for acting independently and forcing the operation, but Zeke points out that Eren succeeded in their common goal of uniting the Founding Titan and a Titan of royal blood (i.e.: Eren and himself). Flashbacks show how contact was made with anti-Marleyan volunteer Yelena, a disciple of Zeke, and how Marley's reconnaissance missions to Paradis were captured, with some collaborating and advancing their technology.
27	December 7, 2018	978-4-06-513479-5; 978-4-06-513936-3 (limited edition)	April 9, 2019	978-1-63236-717-4
107. "Visitor" (来客, Raikyaku); 108. "A Sound Argument" (正論, Seiron); 109. "Guides" (導く者, Michibiku Mono); 110. "Counterfeit" (偽り者, Itsuwarimono)
In the past, Zeke arranged an alliance between the Eldian Restorationists and the nation of Hizuru, of which Mikasa is long-lost royalty. Their ambassador, Kiyomi Azumabito, offers to advance technology on Paradis in exchange for the island's unique resources, while the threat of earth shaking is maintained by a line of Founding Titans and Titans of royal blood for at least fifty years. Historia agrees to become a Titan along with her descendants, but Eren resists. Eren's erratic behaviour brings his motives under question. Gabi and Falco escape and are sheltered by Sasha's family; an adopted girl Sasha once saved conceals their true identities. Historia is revealed to be pregnant, delaying those who wish Zeke executed, including Levi who keeps him under watch. In Marley, Reiner advocates an immediate attack on Paradis. Hange realizes that Yelena, apparently in cooperation with Zeke and Eren, has fraternized and conspired with her troops, who become insubordinate and sow discord, creating a movement around Eren. Mikasa and Armin resolve to learn the truth from imprisoned Eren, but the Commander-in-Chief is assassinated and Eren escapes from custody to join the "Yeagerist" rebels. As the Scouts leave in search of Eren, Pieck is shown on the street.
28	April 9, 2019	978-4-06-514869-3; 978-4-06-514868-6 (limited edition)	August 13, 2019	978-1-63236-783-9
111. "Children of the Forest" (森の子ら, Mori no Kora); 112. "Ignorance" (無知, Muchi); 113. "Savagery" (暴悪, Bōaku); 114. "Sole Salvation" (唯一の救い, Yuiitsu no Sukui)
Sasha's family takes Gabi and Falco to a restaurant where Niccolo, a Marleyan prisoner of war and close friend of Sasha prior to her death, works. Thinking Niccolo is loyal to Marley, Gabi reveals her identity to him and explains that she killed Sasha. Enraged, Niccolo attempts to kill her, but Falco protects her. Both the Blouse family and the Survey Corps refuse to take vengeance. Niccolo reveals that Zeke has been distributing wine laced with his spinal fluid to members of the military, which could be used to spontaneously transform those who have consumed it into Titans, much like he did to Connie's village during the incident with Wall Rose. Eren arrives with the Yeagerists and has a discussion with Mikasa and Armin wherein he rebukes his friends, claiming they lack free will. When Eren claims Mikasa's Ackerman nature has made her a slave to him ever since he saved her as a child, Armin attacks him, but is overpowered. Eren and the Yeagerists take them, Gabi, Falco, Hange and other enemies including the military leadership captive. Meanwhile, Zeke activates his spinal fluid, turning all the soldiers guarding him into Titans except for Levi, who had abstained from drinking the wine. Levi is forced to kill them all but recaptures Zeke, attaching a Thunder Spear to him which will kill him if he attempts to escape again. Zeke recalls his childhood in Marley. He was persuaded to turn his parents over to the authorities by Tom Ksaver, the previous Beast Titan. Ksaver told Zeke his theory that the holder of the Founding Titan could use its power to render all Subjects of Ymir infertile, thus wiping them out and eliminating the threat of Titans which has caused so much suffering. This has been Zeke's goal ever since. Zeke intentionally activates the Thunder Spear, catching both Levi and himself in its explosion.
29	August 9, 2019	978-4-06-516224-8; 978-4-06-516227-9 (special edition)	December 3, 2019	978-1-63236-828-7
115. "Support" (支え, Sasae); 116. "Above and Below" (天地, Tenchi); 117. "Judgment" (断罪, Danzai); 118. "Sneak Attack" (騙し討ち, Damashiuchi)
Zeke is blown in half by the Thunder Spear, but in his dying moments a Titan appears which places him inside its body. He finds himself in an alternate realm where a young girl reconstructs his injured body while he looks upon the "paths" which connect all Eldians, visible as trails of light in the sky. The Yeagerists come across Levi, heavily wounded, but Hange is able to escape along with him when they are distracted by Zeke reemerging from the Titan, rejuvenated. Pieck infiltrates Shiganshina and appears to make a deal with Eren, but instead lures him into a trap and sets Gabi free just as the Marleyan military arrives in a fleet of airships. As Zeke reaches Shiganshina, Pieck, Reiner and Porco work together to prevent Eren from making contact with him. Yelena tells the prisoners about Zeke's plan to use the Coordinate to euthanize the Eldian race. One of her subordinates releases them, and Armin convinces his friends to fight against the Marleyans by reasoning that Eren is only manipulating Zeke and instead intends to release the Titans within the walls in order to defend Paradis from the rest of the world. Pieck fakes her own death to set up a sneak attack on Zeke, which leaves him temporarily incapacitated. All are left anticipating that Zeke will scream once he recovers, knowing this would transform everyone in Shiganshina who ingested his spinal fluid into Titans.
30	December 9, 2019	978-4-06-517543-9; 978-4-06-517547-7 (special edition)	April 14, 2020	978-1-63236-902-4
119. "Two Brothers" (兄と弟, Ani to Otōto); 120. "A Fleeting Moment" (刹那, Setsuna); 121. "Memories of the Future" (未来の記憶, Mirai no Kioku); 122. "From You, 2,000 Years Ago" (二千年前の君から, Ni Sen Nen Mae no Kimi kara)
Falco's older brother Colt begs Zeke to delay his scream until Falco can get to safety, but Zeke screams anyway, transforming all the infected Eldians including Falco into Titans, which results in Colt's death. Reiner nearly allows Falco to eat him but Porco sacrifices himself instead, giving Falco the power of the Jaw Titan. Just as Eren is about to reach the immobilized Zeke, Gabi takes up Colt's rifle and shoots him in the neck, decapitating him. Eren's severed head flies through the air and lands in Zeke's hand, at last providing contact between the Founding Titan and a Titan of royal blood in the instant before Eren dies. Eren awakens, his body intact, in the paths dimension finding Zeke already there. Zeke shows him the girl, identifying her as Ymir Fritz, the first Titan. He attempts to convince Eren to use the Founding Titan's power to command Ymir to sterilize the Eldian race, but Eren refuses. In a final effort to convince Eren of his plan, Zeke uses the paths to show Eren his own childhood through the eyes of their father, believing it will prove that Grisha brainwashed him like he did Zeke. Instead, they find that Grisha changed his ways after arriving on Paradis, never mistreated Eren, and couldn't bring himself to kill the Reiss family after the fall of Wall Maria. Eren uses the power of the Attack Titan to influence Grisha in the past, forcing him to kill them anyway and retroactively causing his father to give him the Attack Titan, thus creating a causal loop. It is revealed that Eren received a vision of himself committing these acts when he kissed Historia's hand after the battle in Shiganshina years prior, due to her royal blood. Grisha sees the future Zeke and apologizes to him, begging him to stop Eren's plan. Back in the paths realm, Zeke commands Ymir to carry out the sterilization, but Eren grabs and stops her before she can. He then witnesses a flashback to Ymir's past. She was a slave to the Eldian king Fritz two thousand years ago, who gained her Titan powers after falling into a tree and connecting with a mysterious organism resembling a centipede. King Fritz then forced Ymir to wage his wars and bear his children (Maria, Rose and Sheena, namesakes of the three walls on Paradis), who inherited her powers when they were made to eat her corpse and passed them on to their own children. After dying, Ymir was trapped in the paths dimension, separate from the flow of time, where she slaved away for millennia constructing Titans every time one transforms or heals its injuries. Eren, outraged by her suffering, tells Ymir she is free to use her powers as she sees fit rather than for his or Zeke's purposes. Breaking down in tears, she seemingly uses the power of the Founding Titan out of her own free will for the first time. In Shiganshina, Eren's spine suddenly extends to reattach his severed head to his body. The walls begin to crumble, revealing the Titans inside, and Eren transforms into the Founding Titan, beginning the Rumbling.
31	April 9, 2020	978-4-06-518689-3; 978-4-06-518688-6 (special edition)	August 25, 2020	978-1-63236-979-6
123. "Island Devils" (島の悪魔, Shima no Akuma); 124. "Thaw" (氷解, Hyōkai); 125. "Sunset" (夕焼け, Yūyake); 126. "Pride" (矜持, Kyōji)
Mikasa recalls the Survey Corps first arriving in Marley. She wonders if there was anything she could have done to prevent this current moment. Eren sends a message to all subjects of Ymir through paths, revealing his plan to destroy the entire world outside of Paradis. The remaining Pure Titans are dispatched with Thunder Spears while Eren leads the Wall Titans away from the island. Connie takes Falco to Ragako Village, planning to feed him to his Titan mother to turn her back into a human. Armin offers himself in Falco's place, which changes Connie's mind. Annie is released from her crystal after Eren used the Founding Titan power to remove all Titan hardening. She allies herself with the Survey Corps with the singular goal of saving her father back in Marley. Hange and Levi consolidate with Pieck and General Magath, since both factions have a desire to take down Zeke. Together, the Warriors and the Survey Corps join forces to save the world from Eren Yeager.
32	September 9, 2020	978-4-06-520322-4; 978-4-06-520323-1 (special edition)	December 22, 2020	978-1-64651-031-3
127. "Night of the End" (終末の夜, Shūmatsu no Yoru); 128. "Traitor" (裏切り者, Uragirimono); 129. "Retrospective" (懐古, Kaiko); 130. "The Dawn of Humanity" (人類の夜明け, Jinrui no Yoake)
Despite some initial mistrust and animosity, the newly formed alliance heads to a nearby port with the plan to board a flying boat to reach Eren. However, the Yeagerists, led by Floch, arrive at the port first. Using their Titan powers and vertical maneuvering equipment, the Warriors and Survey Corps battle the Yeagerists, who support Eren's plan to protect the people of Paradis by destroying the world, and secure a ship and the flying boat. General Magath and Keith Shadis sacrifice themselves to ensure the others won't be followed. The alliance sets their course for the Marleyan city of Odiha to service the flying boat. Meanwhile, the Colossal Titans swim toward Marley, breaking through the world's allied naval forces with ease. Eren recalls revealing his true plan to Floch and Historia. He also remembers learning that Mikasa isn't actually devoted to him because of her Ackerman genetics. Before long, the Titans arrive at the mainland. Remembering his mother's death, Eren continues moving forward, not planning to stop until all his enemies are destroyed.
33	January 8, 2021	978-4-06-522029-0; 978-4-06-522030-6 (special edition)	May 4, 2021	978-1-64651-026-9
131. "The Rumbling" (地鳴らし, Jinarashi); 132. "The Wings of Freedom" (自由の翼, Jiyū no Tsubasa); 133. "Sinners" (罪人達, Tsumibito Tachi); 134. "In the Depths of Despair" (絶望の淵にて, Zetsubō no Fuchi nite)
Colossal Titans continue advancing, killing countless people and destroying civilizations all over the world. Meanwhile, the ship carrying the alliance finally makes it to Odiha. Thinking her father is already dead, Annie decides to stay behind on the ship with Gabi and Falco. The next day, just as the alliance are about to take off, Floch, having survived the battle at the port, damages the hull of the flying boat before being killed by Mikasa. However, before the flying boat can be properly repaired, the Wall titans arrive. Hange appoints Armin the next commander of the Survey Corps before sacrificing themselves by going up against the Wall titans, buying the alliance just enough time to get the plane off the ground. In discussing plans to confront Eren, Armin still hopes to negotiate with him. However, Eren speaks with his friends through paths, explaining that if they want to stop the Rumbling, they must kill him, and that he will not take away their freedom to do so. Back on the ship, Falco reveals that his Titan might have the ability to fly. Many refugees from Liberio, including the Warriors' families, escape to Fort Salta, a Marleyan base. As they arrive, they see a number of airships launching an assault on Eren and his Titans. However, the airships are quickly destroyed by the Beast Titan, which materialized on Eren's skeletal form, leaving everyone utterly hopeless. Just then, the flying boat arrives, and the alliance jump from the aircraft. Reiner and Pieck transform, while Armin calls out to Eren, asking what about him is free.
34	June 9, 2021	978-4-06-523417-4; 978-4-06-523416-7 (special edition 1); 978-4-06-524144-8 (special edition 2)	October 19, 2021	978-1-64651-236-2
135. "The Battle of Heaven and Earth" (天と地の戦い, Ten to Chi no Tatakai); 136. "Dedicate Your Heart" (心臓を捧げよ, Shinzō o Sasageyo); 137. "Titans" (巨人, Kyojin); 138. "A Long Dream" (長い夢, Nagai Yume); 139. "Toward the Tree on That Hill" (あの丘の木に向かって, Ano Oka no Ki ni Mukatte)
The alliance lands on Eren's rib cage, and incapacitate the Beast Titan realizing that it is just a shell with Zeke nowhere to be found. Before Armin has a chance to transform, he is captured in a Titan's mouth. Suddenly, countless versions of the Nine Titans of the past appear on Eren's back, created by Ymir Fritz to defend him. Just as the alliance is nearly defeated, Annie and Gabi appear on the back of Falco's new flying Jaw Titan. Meanwhile, Armin discovers Zeke in the paths and they have a conversation about the meaning of life. Armin convinces Zeke to share his viewpoint on life and the two call on the deceased Titan shifters throughout the series to help the alliance. Zeke then materializes on Eren's Titan and allows Levi to kill him, which stops the Rumbling. After Armin is rescued, he uses the power of his Colossus Titan to destroy Eren's Founding Titan, releasing the centipede-like organism, the source of all Titan power, from Eren's nape. Falco flies down to the Liberio refugees, but the reunion between the Warriors and their families is cut short when the source turns the nearby Eldians, including Jean, Connie, and Gabi, into Titans to help defend it. Reiner, Annie, and Pieck engage the titans and the source to prevent it from reconnecting with Eren while he transforms into the Founding Titan once again to fight Armin, leaving Mikasa and Levi the only ones left who can take Eren down. Jumping off of Falco's back, Levi uses a Thunder Spear to destroy Eren's Titan's mouth exposing his human form within and Mikasa beheads Eren. Ymir is thus freed from the Paths allowing her to pass on, and the Titan powers, along with the source, disappear from the world, turning all the Eldians permanently back into humans. After Eren's death, Armin (and the others) recall a conversation with him prior to his death where he reveals his true motive was to ensure his friends' statuses were elevated to the saviors of humanity to the rest of the world, alongside giving them the long, fulfilling lives he wanted them to have in a world free of Titans. After mourning their friend, Armin decides to take credit for killing Eren, Mikasa leaves to lay Eren to rest on Paradis, and the members of the Alliance are hailed as heroes by the survivors of the Rumbling. Three years later, with eighty percent of humanity decimated, the Yeagerists strengthen Paradis' military to prepare for a potential future attack from the rest of the world, while the members of the Alliance become the world's ambassadors for peace negotiations with Paradis. Mikasa buries Eren's head under a tree that he would frequently rest under as a child and continues to visit his grave throughout the rest of her life. Many generations later, a modernized Shiganshina is bombed from above and destroyed in a war. Over time, Shiganshina is reclaimed by the wilderness, and within this wilderness a lone child and their dog approach the tree Eren used to rest under, which has since grown to resemble the original tree that contained the source of the Titans' power.

=== Junior High ===
Attack on Titan: Junior High (進撃!巨人中学校, Shingeki! Kyojin Chūgakkō) is a parody manga written and illustrated by Saki Nakagawa, serialized in Bessatsu Shōnen Magazine since its May 2012 issue. The first tankōbon volume was released April 9, 2013, and the eleventh and last was released on August 9, 2016. In North America, the series has been licensed in English by Kodansha USA, who published the first volume on March 11, 2014 and the fifth (Note: Kodansha USA released Junior High volumes in a 2-in-1 and 3-in-1 omnibus format.) and last on July 31, 2018.

No.	Original release date	Original ISBN	English release date	English ISBN
1	April 9, 2013	978-4-06-384841-0	March 11, 2014	978-1-61262-916-2
2	August 9, 2013	978-4-06-394903-2	March 11, 2014	978-1-61262-916-2
3	December 9, 2013	978-4-06-394979-7	November 25, 2014	978-1-61262-918-6
4	April 9, 2014	978-4-06-395046-5	November 25, 2014	978-1-61262-918-6
5	August 8, 2014	978-4-06-395143-1	April 28, 2015	978-1-61262-961-2
6	December 9, 2014	978-4-06-395254-4	April 28, 2015	978-1-61262-961-2
7	April 9, 2015	978-4-06-395359-6	November 24, 2015	978-1-63236-113-4
8	August 7, 2015	978-4-06-395445-6	November 24, 2015	978-1-63236-113-4
9	December 9, 2015	978-4-06-395550-7	July 31, 2018	978-1-63236-410-4
10	April 8, 2016	978-4-06-395637-5	July 31, 2018	978-1-63236-410-4
11	August 9, 2016	978-4-06-395721-1	July 31, 2018	978-1-63236-410-4
High School	August 9, 2018	978-4-06-512329-4		

=== Before the Fall ===
Attack on Titan: Before the Fall (進撃の巨人 Before the fall) is a spinoff manga illustrated by Satoshi Shiki, based on the prequel light novel series of the same name written by Ryō Suzukaze. The series has been serialized in Monthly Shōnen Sirius from August 26, 2013 to March 26, 2019, and was collected in seventeen volumes. The first tankōbon volume was released on December 9, 2013 and the last on April 9, 2019. In North America, the series has been licensed in English by Kodansha USA, who published the first volume on March 11, 2014.

No.	Original release date	Original ISBN	English release date	English ISBN
1	December 9, 2013	978-4-06-376439-0	March 11, 2014	978-1-61262-910-0
2	April 9, 2014	978-4-06-376460-4	August 19, 2014	978-1-61262-912-4
3	August 8, 2014	978-4-06-376486-4	December 9, 2014	978-1-61262-914-8
4	December 9, 2014	978-4-06-376515-1	March 31, 2015	978-1-61262-981-0
5	April 9, 2015	978-4-06-376537-3	August 25, 2015	978-1-61262-982-7
6	August 7, 2015	978-4-06-376564-9	December 29, 2015	978-1-63236-224-7
7	December 9, 2015	978-4-06-376590-8	April 12, 2016	978-1-63236-225-4
8	April 8, 2016	978-4-06-390619-6	August 9, 2016	978-1-63236-260-5
9	August 9, 2016	978-4-06-390641-7	December 13, 2016	978-1-63236-320-6
10	December 9, 2016	978-4-06-390667-7	April 18, 2017	978-1-63236-381-7
11	April 7, 2017	978-4-06-390696-7	August 8, 2017	978-1-63236-382-4
12	August 9, 2017	978-4-06-390725-4	December 26, 2017	978-1-63236-383-1
13	December 8, 2017	978-4-06-510504-7	April 3, 2018	978-1-63236-536-1
14	April 9, 2018	978-4-06-511218-2	August 21, 2018	978-1-63236-614-6
15	August 9, 2018	978-4-06-512288-4	December 4, 2018	978-1-63236-657-3
16	December 7, 2018	978-4-06-513812-0	April 4, 2019	978-1-63236-829-4
17	April 9, 2019	978-4-06-515204-1	August 27, 2019	978-1-63236-875-1

=== No Regrets ===
Attack on Titan: No Regrets (進撃の巨人 悔いなき選択, Shingeki no Kyojin Kuinaki Sentaku) is a spinoff manga written by Gun Snark and illustrated by Hikaru Suruga, serialized in the Aria magazine from its start in the November 28, 2013, issue to June 28, 2014. The manga is an adaptation of the visual novel of the same name. It focuses on the origin story of Levi, before he was a part of the Survey Corps Special Operations Squad. In North America, the series has been licensed in English by Kodansha USA, which released both volumes in 2014.

No.	Original release date	Original ISBN	English release date	English ISBN
1	April 9, 2014	978-4-06-376961-6; 978-4-06-362271-3 (special edition)	June 24, 2014	978-1-61262-941-4
2	August 8, 2014	978-4-06-377046-9; 978-4-06-362277-5 (special edition)	October 28, 2014	978-1-61262-943-8

=== Spoof on Titan ===
Sungeki no Kyojin (寸劇の巨人; "Titan Short Skits") is a comedic yonkoma manga written and illustrated by Hounori, released on Kodansha's Manga Box smartphone and tablet application from December 2013 to December 30, 2014, in both Japanese and English. The first tankōbon volume was published on August 8, 2014, and the second on April 9, 2015.

No.	Original release date	Original ISBN	English release date	English ISBN
1	August 8, 2014	978-4-06-395152-3	September 13, 2016	978-1-63236-408-1
2	April 9, 2015	978-4-06-395360-2	December 13, 2016	978-1-63236-409-8

=== Lost Girls ===
A manga adaptation by Ryōsuke Fuji of the light novel of the same name, that began serialization in Kodansha's magazine Bessatsu Shōnen Magazine on August 9, 2015. The series ended in the June 2016 issue of the magazine on May 9, 2016. In North America, the series has been licensed in English by Kodansha USA, which released the volumes in 2016 and 2017.

No.	Original release date	Original ISBN	English release date	English ISBN
1	April 8, 2016	978-4-06-395638-2	August 30, 2016	978-1-63236-385-5
2	August 9, 2016	978-4-06-395722-8	February 28, 2017	978-1-63236-418-0

== Novels ==
=== Before the Fall ===
Attack on Titan: Before the Fall (進撃の巨人 Before the fall) is a light novel written by Ryō Suzukaze and illustrated by Thores Shibamoto. It initially follows the story of Angel, the blacksmith who develops the first prototypes of the Vertical Maneuvering Equipment, before focusing on a young man who was found as a baby in the mouth of a Titan. Three volumes of Before the Fall were published between December 2, 2011, and June 29, 2012. Vertical licensed the light novels in October 2013 for distribution in English.

No.	Original release date	Original ISBN	English release date	English ISBN
1	December 2, 2011	978-4-06-375202-1	September 16, 2014	978-1-939130-86-0
2	March 30, 2012	978-4-06-375228-1	May 26, 2015	978-1-939130-87-7
3	June 29, 2012	978-4-06-375243-4	May 26, 2015	978-1-939130-87-7

=== Harsh Mistress of the City ===
Attack on Titan: Harsh Mistress of the City (進撃の巨人 隔絶都市の女王, Shingeki no Kyojin Kakuzetsu Toshi no Joō) is written by Ryō Kawakami and illustrated by Range Murata. It depicts the aftermath of the fall of Wall Maria first shown at the beginning of the manga. The first volume was published on August 1, 2014 and the second and last on May 1, 2015. Vertical released both volumes in English in 2015.

No.	Original release date	Original ISBN	English release date	English ISBN
1	August 1, 2014	978-4-06-375296-0	August 25, 2015	978-1-941220-62-7
2	May 1, 2015	978-4-06-375299-1	September 29, 2015	978-1-942993-29-2

=== Lost Girls ===
Attack on Titan: Lost Girls (進撃の巨人 Lost Girls) is written by Hiroshi Seko. It comprises three short stories featuring Mikasa Ackerman and Annie Leonhart, titled "Lost in the cruel world", "Wall Sina, Goodbye". It was published in Japan on December 9, 2014, and in North America on June 28, 2016, by Vertical.

No.	Original release date	Original ISBN	English release date	English ISBN
1	December 9, 2014	978-4-06-377096-4	June 28, 2016	978-1-942993-35-3

=== Garrison Girl ===
Garrison Girl: An Attack on Titan Novel was written by American author Rachel Aaron and published by Quirk Books on August 7, 2018. It is centered on Rosalie Dumarque, who defies her family to join the military garrison. A Japanese translation by Izuki Kogyoku was published in Japan on April 7, 2019, under the title Attack on Titan: Roses on the Wall.

No.	Original release date	Original ISBN	Japanese release date	Japanese ISBN
1	August 7, 2018	978-1-6836-9061-0	April 7, 2019	978-4-06-515346-8
