= Izuki Kogyoku =

Japanese author

Izuki Kogyoku (Japanese: 紅玉いづき, Kōgyoku Izuki; born 1984) is a Japanese author.

== Biography ==
Kogyoku was born in Kanazawa, Ishikawa Prefecture.

Due to enjoying the works published by Cobalt Bunko (コバルト文庫), an imprint publishing works geared towards young girls, she began writing novels while still in elementary school. When she was attending Kanazawa Sakuragaoka High School, she was part of a literary club that took part in the National Senior High School Literature Competition (全国高等学校文芸コンクール) where she won the Minister of Education Award (文部科学大臣賞). She then attended Kanazawa University and graduated from the department of literature.

In 2006, her novel Horned Owl and King of the Night was the Grand Prize winner in the thirteenth Dengeki Novel Prize held by ASCII Media Works (formerly MediaWorks).

== Works ==
=== Light novels ===
- Horned Owl and King of the Night (Japanese: ミミズクと夜の王)（Illustrated by:Japanese: 磯野宏夫）
- MAMA (MAMA)（Illustrated by:Japanese: カラス）
- Snow Mantis (Japanese: 雪蟷螂)（Illustrated by:Japanese: 岩城拓郎）
- Garden Lost (ガーデン・ロスト)（Illustrated by:Japanese: 上条衿）
- Spit Reviled of the Princess and the Star Stone (毒吐姫と星の石)（Illustrated by:Japanese: 磯野宏夫）
- Welcome to the Castle Hotel (ようこそ、古城ホテルへ)（Illustrated by:Japanese: 村松加奈子）

=== Game scenario ===
- Fragile Dreams: Farewell Ruins of the Moon (FRAGILE 〜さよなら月の廃墟〜)（Short story in the game — Rainbow bell (七色クロシェット)）
- Final Fantasy: The 4 Heroes of Light (光の4戦士 -ファイナルファンタジー外伝-)

=== Other ===
- Birdcage Miko and Knights of the Holy Sword (鳥籠巫女と聖剣の騎士)
- Youth divorce (青春離婚)（Illustrated by:HERO）
