= List of Assassination Classroom chapters =

Assassination Classroom is a Japanese manga series written and illustrated by Yūsei Matsui. It follows the daily lives of an extremely powerful octopus-like teacher and his students dedicated to the task of assassinating him to prevent Earth from being destroyed.

Individual chapters have been serialized in Weekly Shōnen Jump since July 2012, and are collected into tankōbon volumes published by Shueisha. As of June 2016, twenty volumes have been released in Japan with a circulation of ten million copies. The manga has been licensed by Viz Media for an English language North American release, who released the first volume in December 2014 in both digital and print formats.

== Manga Releases ==
No.	Original release date	Original ISBN	North American release date	North American ISBN
1	November 2, 2012	978-4-08-879270-5	December 2, 2014	978-1-4215-7607-7
001. "Killing Time in Homeroom" (暗殺の時間,, Ansatsu no jikan; lit. 'Assassination Time'); 002. "No Time to Strike Out" (野球の時間, Yakyū no jikan; lit. 'Baseball Time'); 003. "The Perfect Time to Help Out" (サービスの時間, Sābisu no jikan; lit. 'Service Time'); 004. "Time to Get Down to Work" (基礎の時間, Kiso no jikan; lit. 'Fundamentals Time'); 005. "Making Time for Karma" (カルマの時間, Karuma no jikan; lit. 'Karma's Time'); 006. "It's Time to Make a Choice" (二択の時間, Nitaku no jikan; lit. 'Time to Choose'); 007. "Time for a Refreshing Drink" (毒の時間, Doku no jikan; lit. 'Toxin Time'); Extra: "Koro Sensei's Drawing Song" (殺せんせーの絵描き歌, Koro-sensei no Ekakiuta)
2	December 28, 2012	978-4-08-879396-2	February 3, 2015	978-1-4215-7608-4
008. "Breast Time" (胸の時間, Mune no jikan); 009. "Adult Time" (大人の時間, Otona no jikan); 010. "Pro Time" (プロの時間, Puro no jikan); 011. "Assembly Time" (集会の時間, Shūkai no jikan); 012. "Sovereign Time" (支配者の時間, Shihaisha no jikan); 013. "Spinning Time" (くるくるの時間, Kurukuru no jikan); 014. "Test Time" (テストの時間, Tesuto no jikan); 015. "Traveling Time" (旅行の時間, Ryokō no jikan); 016. "Ruined Time" (台無しの時間, Dainashi no jikan); Extra: "Korosensei vs. Saiki Kusuo ~Showdown in Iruma~" (殺せんせーVS斉木楠雄～入間市最終決戦～, Koro-sensei vīesu Saiki Kusuo ~Iruma-shi Saishū Kessen~)
3	March 4, 2013	978-4-08-879459-4	April 7, 2015	978-1-4215-7609-1
017. "Guidebook Time" (しおりの時間, Shiori no jikan); 018. "Red Time" (赤の時間, Aka no jikan); 019. "Curiosity Time" (好奇心の時間, Kōkishin no jikan); 020. "Transfer Student Time" (転校生の時間, Tenkōsei no jikan); 021. "Improvement Time" (改良の時間, Kairyō no jikan); 022. "Autonomy Time" (自律の時間, Jiritsu no jikan); 023. "Humid Time" (湿気の時間, Shikke no jikan); 024. "Retaliation Time" (仕返しの時間, Shikaeshi no jikan); 025. "L and R Time" (LRの時間, LR no jikan)
4	May 2, 2013	978-4-08-870667-2	June 2, 2015	978-1-4215-7610-7
026. "Master's Time" (師匠の時間, Shishō no jikan); 027. "Time to Overcome" (克服の時間, Kokufuku no jikan); 028. "Movie Time" (映画の時間, Eiga no jikan); 029. "Transfer Student Time, 2nd Period" (転校生の時間・二時間目, Tenkōsei no jikan, ni jikanme); 030. "Incredulity Time" (まさかの時間, Masaka no jikan); 031. "Having a Rough Time" (苦戦の時間, Kusen no jikan); 032. "A Time of Connections" (絆の時間, Kizuna no jikan); 033. "Time for a Ball Game" (球技大会の時間, Kyūgi taikai no jikan); 034. "Time to Bat First" (先攻の時間, Senkō no jikan)
5	July 4, 2013	978-4-08-870769-3	August 4, 2015	978-1-4215-7611-4
035. "Huddle Time" (円陣の時間, Enjin no jikan); 036. "Time to Get Close" (近いの時間, Chikai no jikan); 037. "Art Time" (アートの時間, Āto no jikan); 038. "Training Time" (訓練の時間, Kunren no jikan); 039. "Affection Time" (親愛の時間, Shin'ai no jikan); 040. "Nomination Time" (指名の時間, Shimei no jikan); 041. "Talent Time" (才能の時間, Sainō no jikan); 042. "A Time of Uncertainty" (迷いの時間, Mayoi no jikan); 043. "Summertime" (夏の時間, Natsu no jikan)
6	October 4, 2013	978-4-08-870821-8	October 6, 2015	978-1-4215-7612-1
044. "Drowned Time" (溺れる時間, Oboreru jikan); 045. "Swimming Time" (水泳の時間, Suiei no jikan); 046. "Terasaka's Time" (寺坂の時間, Terasaka no jikan); 047. "A Time for Vision" (ビジョンの時間, Bijon no jikan); 048. "A Time for Action" (実行の時間, Jikkō no jikan); 049. "Time on the Scene" (現場の時間, Genba no jikan); 050. "Time for the End of the Semester" (期末の時間, Kimatsu no jikan); 051. "The Son's Time" (息子の時間, Musuko no jikan); 052. "The Ace's Time" (エースの時間, Ēsu no jikan)
7	December 27, 2013	978-4-08-870854-6	December 8, 2015	978-1-4215-7613-8
053. "Time for the Five Subjects" (五教科の時間, Go-kyōka no jikan); 054. "Frustration Time" (挫折の時間, Zasetsu no jikan); 055. "Time for the Closing of the First Semester" (終業の時間・1学期, Shūgyō no jikan: 1 gakki); 056. "Time for the Living" (いきものの時間, Ikimono no jikan); 057. "Strategy Time" (策謀の時間, Sakubō no jikan); 058. "Island Time" (島の時間, Shima no jikan); 059. "Go Time" (決行の時間, Kekkō no jikan); 060. "Time for an Unusual Event" (異変の時間, Ihen no jikan); 061. "Demon Time" (伏魔の時間, Fukuma no jikan); Extra: "Korosensei vs. Saiki Kusuo ~Showdown in Iruma~" (殺せんせーVS斉木楠雄～入間市最終決戦II～, Koro-sensei vīesu Saiki Kusuo ~Iruma-shi Saishū Kessen Tsū~)
8	March 4, 2014	978-4-08-880028-8	February 2, 2016	978-1-4215-8280-1
062. "Pro Time, 2nd Period" (プロの時間・2時間目, Puro no jikan, ni jikanme); 063. "Command Time" (引率の時間, Insotsu no jikan); 064. "Obsession Time" (拘りの時間, Kakawari no jikan); 065. "Karma's Time, 2nd Period" (カルマの時間・2時間目, Karuma no jikan, ni jikanme); 066. "Girl Time" (女子の時間, Joshi no jikan); 067. "Weapon Time" (武器の時間, Buki no jikan); 068. "Chance Time" (チャンスの時間, Chansu no jikan); 069. "Mastermind Time" (黒幕の時間, Kuromaku no jikan); 070. "Takaoka's Time" (鷹岡の時間, Takaoka no jikan)
9	May 2, 2014	978-4-08-880059-2	April 5, 2016	978-1-4215-8281-8
071. "Reprimand Time" (叱咤の時間, Shitta no jikan); 072. "Sound Time" (音の時間, Oto no jikan); 073. "Adult Time, 2nd Period" (大人の時間・2時間目, Otona no jikan, ni jikanme); 074. "Scary Time" (怖い時間, Kowai jikan); 075. "Murder Time" (殺しの時間, Koroshi no jikan); 076. "Shock Time" (衝撃の時間, Shōgeki no jikan); 077. "Curse Time" (呪いの時間, Noroi no jikan); 078. "Takebayashi's Time" (竹林の時間, Takebayashi no jikan); 079. "Sovereign Time, 2nd Period" (支配者の時間・2時間目, Shihaisha no jikan, ni jikanme)
10	July 4, 2014	978-4-08-880137-7	June 7, 2016	978-1-4215-8322-8
080. "Kayano's Time" (茅野の時間, Kayano no jikan); 081. "Tag Time" (鬼ごっこの時間, Onigokko no jikan); 082. "Robber Time" (泥棒の時間, Dorobō no jikan); 083. "Robber Time, 2nd Period" (泥棒の時間・2時間目, Dorobō no jikan, ni jikanme); 084. "Limit Time" (限界の時間, Genkai no jikan); 085. "Chess Piece Time" (駒の時間, Koma no jikan); 086. "Tenacity Time" (執着の時間, Shūchaku no jikan); 087. "Nauseous Time" (吐きそうな時間, Haki-sōna jikan); 088. "Spin Time" (紡ぐ時間, Tsumugu jikan)
11	October 3, 2014	978-4-08-880194-0	August 2, 2016	978-1-4215-8323-5
089. "Name Time" (名前の時間, Namae no jikan); 090. "Ikemen Time" (イケメンの時間, Ikemen no jikan); 091. "Athletic Festival Time" (体育祭の時間, Taiikumatsuri no jikan); 092. "Tactics Time" (戦術の時間, Senjutsu no jikan); 093. "Leader's Time" (リーダーの時間, Rīdā no jikan); 094. "Defeat Time" (敗北の時間, Haiboku no jikan); 095. "Mistake Time" (間違う時間, Machigau jikan); 096. "Before Time" (ビフォーの時間, Bifō no jikan); 097. "After Time" (アフターの時間, Afutā no jikan)
12	December 27, 2014	978-4-08-880223-7	October 4, 2016	978-1-4215-8324-2
098. "Present Time" (プレゼントの時間, Purezento no jikan); 099. "Present Time, 2nd Period" (プレゼントの時間・2時間目, Purezento no jikan, ni jikanme); 100. "Shinigami Time" (『死神』の時間, Shinigami no jikan); 101. "Counterattack Time" (反撃の時間, Hangeki no jikan); 102. "Shinigami Time, 2nd Period" (『死神』の時間・2時間目, Shinigami no jikan, ni jikanme); 103. "Shinigami Time, 3rd Period" (『死神』の時間・3時間目, Shinigami no jikan, 3 jikanme); 104. "Shinigami Time, 4th Period" (『死神』の時間・4時間目, Shinigami no jikan, 4 jikanme); 105. "Shinigami Time, 5th Period" (『死神』の時間・5時間目, Shinigami no jikan, 5 jikanme); 106. "Shinigami Time, 6th Period" (『死神』の時間・6時間目, Shinigami no jikan, 6 jikanme)
13	March 4, 2015	978-4-08-880317-3	December 6, 2016	978-1-4215-8444-7
107. "Shinigami Time, 7th Period" (『死神』の時間・7時間目, Shinigami no jikan, 7 jikanme); 108. "Shinigami Time, 8th Period" (『死神』の時間・8時間目, Shinigami no jikan, 8 jikanme); 109. "Shinigami Time, 9th Period" (『死神』の時間・9時間目, Shinigami no jikan, 9 jikanme); 110. "World Time" (世界の時間, Sekai no jikan); 111. "Career Time" (進路の時間, Shinro no jikan); 112. "2 Lap Time" (2周目の時間, 2-Shū-me no jikan); 113. "1 Lap Time" (1周目の時間, 1-Shū-me no jikan); 114. "Nagisa's Time" (渚の時間, Nagisa no jikan); 115. "School Festival Time" (学園祭の時間, Gakuen-sai no jikan)
14	May 1, 2015	978-4-08-880354-8	February 7, 2017	978-1-4215-8505-5
116. "Customer Time" (客の時間, Kyaku no jikan); 117. "Welcome Customer Time" (珍客の時間, Chinkyaku no jikan); 118. "Edge Time" (縁の時間, En no jikan); 119. "End of Term Time" (期末の時間, Kimatsu no jikan); 120. "Excitement Time" (殺気の時間, Sakki no jikan); 121. "Solution Time" (解法の時間, Kaihō no jikan); 122. "Space Time" (空間の時間, Kūkan no jikan); 123. "Malfunction Time" (誤作動の時間, Go sadō no jikan); 124. "Teacher Exam Time" (教員試験の時間, Kyōin shiken no jikan)
15	July 3, 2015	978-4-08-880425-5	April 4, 2017	978-1-4215-8641-0
125. "Perfection Time" (完璧の時間, Kanpeki no jikan); 126. "Time to Utilize" (生かす時間, Ikasu jikan); 127. "Theater Time" (演劇の時間, Engeki no jikan); 128. "Storm Time" (嵐の時間, Arashi no jikan); 129. "True Identity Time" (正体の時間, Shōtai no jikan); 130. "Revenge Time" (仇の時間, Kataki no jikan); 131. "Attack Time" (侵蝕の時間, Shinshoku no jikan); 132. "Time for the Killing Technique" (殺し技の時間, Koroshi-waza no jikan); 133. "Confession Time" (告白の時間, Kokuhaku no jikan)
16	October 3, 2015	978-4-08-880485-9	June 6, 2017	978-1-4215-9091-2
134. "Past Time" (過去の時間, Kako no jikan); 135. "Past Time, 2nd Period" (過去の時間・2時間目, Kako no jikan, 2-jikan-me); 136. "Past Time, 3rd Period" (過去の時間・3時間目, Kako no Jikan, 3-jikan-me); 137. "Past Time, 4th Period" (過去の時間・4時間目, Kako no Jikan, 4-jikan-me); 138. "Past Time, 5th Period" (過去の時間・5時間目, Kako no Jikan, 5-jikan-me); 139. "Past Time, 6th Period" (過去の時間・6時間目, Kako no Jikan, 6-jikan-me); 140. "Past Time, 7th Period" (過去の時間・7時間目, Kako no Jikan, 7-jikan-me); 141. "End of Term Time, 2nd Period" (期末の時間・2時間目, Kimatsu no jikan, 2-jikan-me); 142. "Hesitation Time" (ためらいの時間, Tamerai no jikan)
17	December 28, 2015	978-4-08-880581-8	August 1, 2017	978-1-4215-9092-9
143. "Division Time" (分裂の時間, Bunretsu no jikan); 144. "Killers' Time" (ころしや達の時間, Koroshiya-tachi no jikan); 145. "Claw Time" (爪の時間, Tsume no jikan); 146. "Time for a Fierce Battle" (激戦の時間, Gekisen no jikan; lit. Aggressive Battle Time); 147. "Stage Time" (舞台の時間, Butai no jikan); 148. "Course Time" (過程の時間, Katei no jikan); 149. "Time for the Results" (結果の時間, Kekka no jikan; lit. Upshot Time); 150. "Independent Research Time" (自由研究の時間, Jiyukenkyū no jikan); 151. "Velocity Time" (速度の時間, Sokudo no jikan)
18	March 4, 2016	978-4-08-880627-3	October 3, 2017	978-1-4215-9093-6
152. "Space Time" (宇宙の時間, Uchū no jikan); 153. "Final Resolve Time" (覚悟の時間, Kakugo no jikan); 154. "Winter Break Time" (冬休みの時間, Fuyuyasumi no jikan); 155. "Super Teacher Time" (超先生の時間, Chō sensei no jikan); 156. "Seven-Three Time" (七三の時間, Shichi-san no jikan); 157. "Enemy Time" (敵の時間, Teki no jikan); 158. "Time for Valentine's" (バレンタインの時間, Barentain no jikan); 159. "Time for Valentine's, 2nd Period" (バレンタインの時間・2時間目, Barentain no jikan, 2-jikan-me); 160. "Time for Valentine's, After School" (バレンタインの時間 放課後, Barentain no jikan, hōkago)
19	April 4, 2016	978-4-08-880651-8	December 5, 2017	978-1-4215-9337-1
161. "Pride Time" (プライドの時間, Puraido no jikan); 162. "A Time for Memories" (思い出の時間, Omoide no jikan); 163. "Decision Time" (確定の時間, Kakutei no jikan); 164. "Mayhem Time" (混乱の時間, Konran jikan); 165. "Time for a Perfect Argument" (正論の時間, Seiron no jikan); 166. "Confusion Time" (困惑の時間, Konwaku no jikan); 167. "Trust Time" (信頼の時間, Shinrai no jikan); 168. "Flourish Time" (開花の時間, Kaika no jikan); 169. "Time to Get to School" (登校の時間, Tōkō no jikan)
20	June 3, 2016	978-4-08-880686-0	February 6, 2018	978-1-4215-9338-8
170. "Next Generation Time" (次世代の時間, Jisedai no jikan); 171. "Final Boss Time" (ラスボスの時間, Rasubosu no jikan); 172. "Students' Time" (生徒の時間, Seito no jikan); 173. "My Students Time" (私の生徒の時間, Watashi no seito no jikan); 174. "Facial Expressions Time" (顔色の時間, Kaoiro no jikan); 175. "Lost Time" (戻らない時間, Modoranai jikan); 176. "Time Has Come" (やってきた時間, Yattekita jikan); 177. "Graduation Time" (卒業の時間, Sotsugyō no jikan)
21	July 4, 2016	978-4-08-880727-0	April 3, 2018	978-1-4215-9339-5
178. "Time for Tears" (涙の時間, Namida no jikan); 179. "Time to Time" (去りゆく時間, Sariyuku jikan); 180. "Killing Time" (殺しの時間, Koroshi no jikan); Extra 1: "Home Time" (自宅の時間, Jitaku no jikan); Extra 2: "Pub Time" (居酒屋の時間, Izakaya no jikan); Extra 3: "Identity Time" (素性の時間, Sujō no jikan); Extra 4: "Thank You Time" (ありがとうの時間, Arigatō no jikan); Extra 5: "A Memoir of Tokyo Department Store War" (東京デパート戦争体験記, Tōkyō depāto sensō taikenki)
