= List of Tokyo Ghoul chapters =

Tokyo Ghoul, as well as the sequel Tokyo Ghoul:re and prequel Tokyo Ghoul: Jack, are written and illustrated by Sui Ishida. The light novels are written by Shin Towada and illustrated by Sui Ishida.

Tokyo Ghoul follows the main character Ken Kaneki, his various companions and the CCG.

Tokyo Ghoul is completed and consists of 14 tankōbon volumes released between February 17, 2012, and October 17, 2014. Viz Media released the English version from June 16, 2015, to August 15, 2017. Tokyo Ghoul is also being translated into German and French, respectively, by Kazé Manga and Glénat.

Tokyo Ghoul:re, the sequel to Tokyo Ghoul, was serialised in Weekly Young Jump from October 16, 2014, to July 5, 2018, and has been released from December 2014 to July 2018 in 16 tankōbon volumes. Viz released the first English volume on October 17, 2017.

== Tokyo Ghoul ==
No.	Original release date	Original ISBN	English release date	English ISBN
1	February 17, 2012	978-4-08-879272-9	June 16, 2015	978-1-4215-8036-4
1. "Tragedy" (悲劇, Higeki); 2. "Oddity" (異変, Ihen); 3. "Worst" (最悪, Saiaku); 4. "Coffee" (珈琲, Kōhī); 5. "Feeding Ground" (喰場, Kuiba); 6. "Homing" (帰巣, Kisō); 7. "Deception" (欺罔, Kimō); 8. "Kagune" (赫子, Kagune); 9. "Hatch" (孵化, Fuka)
2	March 19, 2012	978-4-08-879291-0	August 18, 2015	978-1-4215-8037-1
10. "Antique" (骨董, Kottō); 11. "Mask" (仮面, Kamen); 12. "Mission" (任務, Ninmu); 13. "White Dove" (白鳩, Hato); 14. "Rain Shower" (驟雨, Shūu); 15. "Mother and Daughter" (母娘, Oyako); 16. "Confinement" (幽囚, Yūshū); 17. "Rabbit Mask" (兎面, Usagi-men); 18. "Savage" (未開, Mikai); 19. "Underground" (地下, Chika)
3	June 19, 2012	978-4-08-879357-3	October 20, 2015	978-1-4215-8038-8
20. "White Gate" (白門, Shiromon); 21. "Condolences" (哀悼, Aitō); 22. "Newspaper" (新聞, Shinbun); 23. "Disappearance" (失踪, Shissō); 24. "Hidden Sword" (隠刃, Onjin); 25. "Epiphany" (開眼, Kaigan); 26. "Adversary" (対者, Taisha); 27. "Three People" (三人, San'nin); 28. "Circular" (円環, Enkan); 29. "Mado" (真戸, Mado)
4	September 19, 2012	978-4-08-879420-4	December 15, 2015	978-1-4215-8039-5
30. "Bitterness" (苦味, Nigami); 31. "Yoriko" (依子, Yoriko); 32. "Gourmet" (美食, Bishoku); 33. "Cajolery" (甘言, Kangen); 34. "Slide" (滑台, Suberidai); 35. "Solitary Battle" (孤闘, Kotō); 36. "Preparation" (下拵, Shitagoshirae); 37. "Banquet" (晩餐, Bansan); 38. "Dismemberment" (解体, Kaitai); 39. "Feast" (饗宴, Kyōen)
5	December 19, 2012	978-4-08-879478-5	February 16, 2016	978-1-4215-8040-1
40. "Invitation" (招待, Shōtai); 41. "Moonlight" (月光, Gekkō); 42. "Curettage" (掻爬, Sōha); 43. "Scar" (残痕, Zankon); 44. "Incarnation" (受肉, Juniku); 45. "Black Wings" (黒羽, Kurohane); 46. "Light" (灯火, Tōka); 47. "Alias" (偽名, Gimei); 48. "Ear Bone" (耳骨, Jikotsu); Side story: "Rize" (リゼ, Rize)
6	January 18, 2013	978-4-08-879498-3	April 19, 2016	978-1-4215-8041-8
49. "Caged Bird" (籠鳥, Rōchō); 50. "Banjo" (万丈, Banjō); 51. "Edict" (勅令, Chokurei); 52. "Seize" (強奪, Gōdatsu); 53. "Lecture" (講義, Kōgi); 54. "Aogiri" (青桐, Aogiri); 55. "Plot" (画策, Kakusaku); 56. "Mischief" (蠢動, Shundō); 57. "Escape" (逃奔, Tōhon); 58. "Crooked Smile" (歪笑, Waishō)
7	April 19, 2013	978-4-08-879546-1	June 21, 2016	978-1-4215-8042-5
59. "Closed" (休業, Kyūgyō); 60. "High Spirits" (衝天, Shōten); 61. "Glimmer" (微光, Bikō); 62. "Kaneki" (金木, Kaneki); 63. "Ghoul" (喰種, Gūru); 64. "Nuisance" (邪魔, Jama); 65. "Kakuja" (赫者, Kakuja); 66. "Removal" (摘出, Tekishutsu); 67. "Conscience" (呵責, Kashaku); 68. "Encounter" (邂逅, Kaikō)
8	July 19, 2013	978-4-08-879613-0	August 16, 2016	978-1-4215-8043-2
69. "Bygone Days" (過日, Kajitsu); 70. "Sister and Brother" (姉弟, Kyōdai); 71. "Two People" (二人, Futari); 72. "Half" (半端, Hanpa); 73. "Spark" (火花, Hibana); 74. "Indomitable" (不屈, Fukutsu); 75. "Secret" (秘密, Himitsu); 76. "Beacon" (狼煙, Noroshi); 77. "Tower 7" (七棟, Shichitō); 78. "Diversion" (陽動, Yōdō); 79. "New Light" (新光, Shinkō)
9	October 18, 2013	978-4-08-879652-9	October 18, 2016	978-1-4215-8044-9
80. "Promotion" (昇任, Shōnin); 81. "Subordinate" (部下, Buka); 82. "Expert" (識者, Shikisha); 83. "Priest/Father" (神父, Shinpu); 84. "Emergence" (浮上, Fujō); 85. "One-Eye" (隻眼, Sekigan); 86. "Visitor" (来客, Raikyaku); 87. "Rumor" (噂話, Uwasabanashi); 88. "Precarious" (剣呑, Ken'non); 89. "Scheme" (奸計, Kankei)
10	January 17, 2014	978-4-08-879807-3	December 20, 2016	978-1-4215-8045-6
90. "Pursuit" (追駆, Tsuiku); 91. "Fortitude" (剛毅, Gōki); 92. "Lady" (淑女, Shukujo); 93. "Bait" (好餌, Kōji); 94. "Inner Thoughts" (胸中, Kyōchū); 95. "Temporary Dwelling" (寓居, Gūkyo); 96. "Underground" (潜行, Senkō); 97. "Restraint" (下弦, Kagen); 98. "Depths" (深層, Shinsō); 99. "Unknown" (未知, Michi); 100. "Centipede" (百足, Mukade)
11	April 18, 2014	978-4-08-879809-7	February 21, 2017	978-1-4215-8046-3
101. "Hybrid" (混成, Konsei); 102. "Black and White" (白黒, Shirokuro); 103. "Close Shave" (刺剃, Sasori); 104. "Gas" (瓦斯, Gasu); 105. "Inner Struggle" (僕私, Bokushi); 106. "Amnesty" (大赦, Taisha); 107. "Fissure" (裂目, Sakeme); 108. "Artificial" (人工, Jinkō); 109. "Hanged-Man" (吊人, Tsurushibito); 110. "Returning" (帰来, Kirai); 111. "Tracks" (線路, Senro)
12	June 19, 2014	978-4-08-879859-2	April 18, 2017	978-1-4215-8047-0
112. "Lights Out" (消灯, Shōtō); 113. "Incomplete" (氾羽, Hanpa); 114. "Entanglement" (絡身, Karami); 115. "Collapse" (破崩, Hahō); 116. "Reunion" (再逢, Saihō); 117. "Dry Field" (乾田, Kanden); 118. "Opened Lock" (解錠, Kaijō); 119. "Antique" (旧九, Kyūkyū); 120. "Penetration" (透過, Tōka); 121. "Bull's Eye" (正鵠, Seikoku)
13	August 20, 2014	978-4-08-879887-5	June 20, 2017	978-1-4215-9042-4
122. "Yellow Bell" (黄鈴, Kirin); 123. "Home Front" (銃後, Jūgo); 124. "Public" (口前, Kuchimae); 125. "Destructive Spiral" (壊天, Kaiten); 126. "Original Sin" (原罪, Genzai); 127. "Bad Terms" (堅縁, Ken'en); 128. "Anticipation" (街望, Machi Nozomu); 129. "Ambush" (芸劇, Geigeki); 130. "Disappearance" (勝執, Shōshitsu); 131. "Answer" (改問, Kaimon); 132. "Reunion" (祭開, Saikai)
14	October 17, 2014	978-4-08-890031-5	August 15, 2017	978-1-4215-9043-1
133. "Opening" (塊砕, Kaisai); 134. "No Passing" (倒惨, Tōsan); 135. "Shower" (終雨, Shūu); 136. "Owl" (伏牢, Fukurō); 137. "Someday" (溢花, Itsuka); 138. "Corpse Orchid" (屍爛, Shiran); 139. "Last Work" (畏錯, Isaku); 140. "Moderation" (切声, Sessei); 141. "Matter of Regret" (痕児, Konji or Kongo); 142. "Performance" (宴戯, Engi); 143. "Memorial" (研, Ken); Epilogue

=== One-shot ===
Released March 15, 2011. Features the one-shot chapter of Tokyo Ghoul. It was published by Miracle Jump.

== Tokyo Ghoul:re ==
No.	Original release date	Original ISBN	English release date	English ISBN
1	December 19, 2014	978-4-08-879272-9	October 17, 2017	978-1-4215-9496-5
1. "Bone" (骨, Hone); 2. "Reader to Leader" (委舵と畏蛇, Ida to Ida); 3. "Bell" (鐘, Kane); 4. "Remit to See, Limit to See" (未と師、視と屍, Mi to Shi, Mi to Shi); 5. "Resist" (執徒, Shitto); 6. "Reaction to a Reaction" (握人への悪賭, Akuto e no Akuto); 7. "Remind" (昧人, Maindo); 8. "Regent" (代行者, Daikōsha); 9. "Recreation" (継情, Keijō)
Three years after the raid of Anteiku, the CCG establishes a new task force composed of humans who passed through ghoul experimentation known as "Quinxes", led by Rank 1 Investigator Haise Sasaki. Tasked to hunt down a dangerous ghoul known as "Torso", the team is forced to confront the S ranked ghoul known as "Serpent" instead. In the occasion, Haise recognizes Serpent as Nishio, and briefly remembers that he is actually Kaneki, whose life was spared by Arima and now lives a new life with no memories of his former self. After losing both Torso and Serpent's trails, the Quinxes are tasked to track down another infamous ghoul known as "Nutcracker", and while paying a visit to coffee shop ":re", Haise meets Touka working there.
2	March 19, 2015	978-4-08-890132-9	December 19, 2017	978-1-4215-9497-2
10. "Redoubt" (疑枠, Giwaku); 11. "Remiss" (待ち甲斐, Machigai); 12. "Reckon" (枯魂, Kodama); 13. "Let It Rain Blood" (ああ降ろう、血, Ā Furō, Chi); 14. "Refrain" (韻に触れる, In ni Fureru); 15. "Record" (更努, Kōdo); 16. "Right" (右, Migi); 17. "Adored" (モテ, Mote); 18. "Ferry" (渡し舟, Watashibune); 19. "Party" (パーティー, Pātī); 20. "Reload" (回転移動, Kaiten Idō)
The CCG's investigations discover that Torso, Nutcracker and several other infamous Ghouls will attend an underground event where captured humans are auctioned. Tooru Mutsuki, a member of Haise's team infiltrates the auction disguised as a captive, just to put himself in harm's way upon meeting Torso again, while Haise and the rest of the investigators storm the place.
3	June 19, 2015	978-4-08-890211-1	February 20, 2018	978-1-4215-9498-9
21. "Reel" (選る, Yoru); 22. "Rebut" (謬徒, Byūto); 23. "Relish" (梨酒, Rishu); 24. "Rebuke" (撫気, Buke); 25. "Relay" (令, Rei); 26. "Rear" (あ, A); 27. "Recoil" (呼居, Koiru); 28. "Rebalance" (場乱す, Ba Imasu); 29. "Rescue" (栖求, Sukyū); 30. "Recall" (凍る, Kōru); 31. "Repute" (ピュート, Pyūto); 32.1. "Joker" (ジョーカー, Jōkā)
The raid at the auction ends up with several Ghouls in the most wanted list killed, including Nutcracker. However, Akira is astonished upon learning that Takizawa, who was supposed to be KIA in the battle of Anteiku, returns as a Ghoul to fight against them. Hinami decides to help Haise drive him out, but because of this, she ends up captured by Arima, and in return, Haise asks for her custody.
4	September 18, 2015	978-4-08-890254-8	April 17, 2018	978-1-4215-9499-6
31.5. "Rest" (主と, Shu to; "With the Lord"); 32. "Requital" (喰い足る, Kuitaru; "Eat and Run"); 33. "Reduction" (抱く書, Idakusho; "Embracing Books"); 34. "Great Form" (良い形, Yoi Katachi); 35. "Addicted" (依存, Izon; "Dependence"); 36. "Rift" (ふと, Futo; "Suddenly"); 37. "Recipe" (屍秘, Shipi; "Corpse's Secret"); 38. "Realm" (あるM, Aru M; "A Certain M"); 39. "Refuse" (深浅, Shinsen; "Depth"); 40. "Remora" (網羅, Mōra; "Comprising"); 41. "Reface" (fのエース, f no Ēsu; "The Ace of F")
The Quinx Squad is assigned to a task force to hunt down a survivor from the Rosewald family, a powerful clan of Ghouls who were supposed to be extinct. Meanwhile, Shuu Tsukiyama, who was devastated since Kaneki's disappearance, learns about his new identity as Sasaki and unbeknownst to him, his servant Kanae von Rosewald hires some members of the Aogiri Tree to set up an ambush on Sasaki and his team. While Haise and co. drive away their attackers, Shu visits Touka, seeking her help with returning Sasaki's memories as Kaneki.
5	December 19, 2015	978-4-08-890331-6	June 19, 2018	978-1-4215-9500-9
42. "Retort" (灯糸, Hīto; "Filament"); 43. "Region" (示音, Jion); 44. "#" ("#"); 45. "Plant" (計画t, Keikaku tī); 46. "°C" (°C, Shīdo); 47. "Rematch" (燐寸, Macchi); 48. "N.T." (N.T., Enu Tī); 49. "Repulse" (脈打つ信号, Myakūtsu shingō; "Pulsing Signal"); 50. "Hand" (手, Te); 51. "Resolution" (剃る芯, Soru shin; "Shaving Cores"); 52. "Eve" (イヴ, Ivu)
Touka rejects Shuu's offer, claiming that she establishes the :re café with the purpose of being a safe haven for Kaneki, but only if he chooses to return by his own will. Meanwhile, Kanae is approached by Eto who offers him a chance to get stronger. Some time later, the CCG discovers that Shuu's entire family and conglomerate is led by ghouls and stages a massive operation to take them down. In the occasion, Shuu ends up being pursued by no other than Sasaki, who knows that the ghoul holds the answers about his past. When Haise corners Shuu, a transformed Kanae appears to protect his master.
6	March 18, 2016	978-4-08-890376-7	August 21, 2018	978-1-4215-9501-6
53. "Dream" (夢, Yume); 54. "Revenge" (娩児, Benji; "Born Child"); 55. "Alice&" (Alice&, Arisu to); 56. "The Second King" (二の王, Futatsu no Ō); 57. "Regret and Smile" (悔いて笑む, Kuite Emu); 58. "Resurrection" (戯れ薄く, Zare Usuku; "Playfully Faint"); 59. "Relief!" (伏せ!, Fuse!; "Kneel!"); 60. "String of Blood" (血の糸, Chi-no Ito); 61. "the ENT" (ji Ento); 62. "Holding the City" (都を抱く, To o Daku); 63. "Regenesis" (葬生樹, Sōseiki)
As Haise confronts Shuu, Eto, the leader of the Aogiri appears to intervene, and Haise regains his lost memories as Kaneki, becoming stronger than ever, enough to defeat Eto, although she manages to escape. In the occasion, he also allows Shuu to flee after remembering about him as well. Upon confirming that Eto is in fact his favourite author Sen Takatsuki, Haise exposes and arrests her, but complies with her request to make one last statement to the press, in which she reveals to the world that she is a ghoul. Meanwhile, on a recoinassance mission to the headquarters of Aogiri Tree, Mutsuki is captured by Torso.
7	June 17, 2016	978-4-08-890411-5	October 16, 2018	978-1-4215-9502-3
64. "Recoup" (喰う腑, Kuu Fu; "A Devouring Gut"); 65. "Remove" (重歩, Chōbo; "Heavy Steps"); 66. "Real Self" (古き護り, Furuki Mamori; "Old Guard"); 67. "Rekey" (器移, Ki'i; "Changing Vessels"); 68. "Resit" (Sのそれ, Esu no Sore; "S's That"); 69. "Relock" (施浄, Sejō; "Administer the Cleanse"); 70. "Thunder Rabbit" (カミナリウサギ, Kaminari Usagi); 71. "Revoke" (望苦, Bōku; "Hope and Suffering"); 72. "Retransmit" (失神と伝導, Shisshin to Dendō; "Syncope and Transmission"); 73. "Flower" (花, Hana); 74. "EF" (EF, Ī Efu); 75. "K's Egg" (Kの卵, Kei no Tamago)
With their leader under their custody, the CCG starts a large scale operation to raid the island where the Aogiri Tree set their main base. Meanwhile, Ayato and some companions storm the Cochlea prison in order to rescue Hinami, who is about to be transferred for execution, with the unexpected help from Haise, who now reassumes his identity as Kaneki, betrays the CCG and lifts off all security in order to rescue her by himself. In the occasion, Kaneki reunites with Touka and Renji, and have them all flee with Hinami while he stays behind to confront Arima once again.
8	September 16, 2016	978-4-08-890497-9	December 18, 2018	978-1-4215-9503-0
76. "Doubt" (惰疎, Dauto; "Lazy Dearth"); 77. "Seven" (死痴, Shichi; "Foolish Death"); 78. "100p" 79. "Devour" (喰らい, Kurai); 80. "Teeth" (歯を, Ha o); 81. "Hai" (琲, Hai; "String of Pearls"); 82. "Heart" (心臓を, Shinzō o); 83. "Heard the Sound of the Gate Closing" (門のとじる音をきいた, Mon no Tojiru Oto o Kiita); 84. "Given Wings" (羽 与えられ, Hane ataerare); 85. "White Box" (しろい箱, Shiroi hako); 86. "White Rainbow" (白虹, Hakkō or Shironiji)
Under Torso's mercy, Mutsuki remembers the darkest secrets of his past that he was repressing so far and kills his captor, before disappearing. Meanwhile, Eto breaks free but is mortally wounded by First-Class Investigator Nimura Furuta, who reveals that he underwent the same procedure as Kaneki. While fighting Arima, Kaneki renews his conviction to keep fighting and living for his loved ones and defeats him. Arima then commits suicide, but before passing away, he reveals to Kaneki that the Washū Clan, that controls the CCG, is composed of Ghouls. Before she presumably dies as well, Eto learns of Arima's defeat and concludes that both had succeeded with their plan to raise Kaneki to become the "One-Eyed King", with the power to change the world.
9	December 19, 2016	978-4-08-890559-4	February 19, 2019	978-1-4215-9824-6
87. "Reenact" (厭なこ, Iya na ko; "A Hated Child"); 88. "Relief" (はっぱ, Happa; "Blast"); 89. "Vomit" (嘔吐すべき, Ōto Subeki); 90. "Trash" (クズ, Kuzu); 91. "Hunger" (うえ, Ue); 92. "Ugly Head" (醜頭, Minikuiatama); 93. "f's lie" (fの嘘, f no Uso); 94. "Opening Chest" (広げる胸, Hirogeru Mune); 95. "Am" (Am, Ē Emu); 96. "Doubting Blood" (疑う血, Utagau Chi); 97. "One Body" (身一つ, Mi Hitotsu); 98. "Old School" (旧派, Kyūha)
10	March 17, 2017	978-4-08-890603-4	April 16, 2019	978-1-4215-9825-3
99. "White" (白, Shiro); 100. "Red Hand's" (赤い手の, Akai Te no); 101. "Toy's" (玩具の, Omocha no); 102. "Taiwa" (大環, Ōkan; "Great Wheel"); 103. "Overwhelming Wealth" (ありあまるほどの富, Ariamaru hodo no tomi); 104. "Sudden Death" (頓シ, Tomi shi); 105. "Floor" (床, Yuka); 106. "Bad Line" (ダメな線, Damena sen; "A Hopeless Course"); 107. "V" (V, Vī); 108. "Permanent" (永久, Towa); 109. "To the Pen" (ペンまで, Pen made); 110. "That" (其れ, Sore)
11	June 19, 2017	978-4-08-890682-9	June 18, 2019	978-1-9747-0038-7
111. "Gathering P" (集合P, Shūgōpi); 112. "Rescue" (栖救, Sei kyū); 113. "I Am" (わたしは, Watashi wa); 114. "Beloved" (いとし, Itoshi); 115. "Questioning Child" (問い子, Toi-ko); 116. "A Dream from a Certain Time" (いつかの夢, Itsuka no yume); 117. "Thumbs Up" (親指立てる, Oyayubi tateru); 118. "Good Story" (良い話, Ī hanashi); 119. "Cruz" (クルス, Kurusu); 120. "Vessel" (う・つ・わ, U·tsu·wa); 121. "The Hanged Man" (ひとり吊るされる, Hitori tsurusareru); 122. "When?" (何時にする？, Nanji ni suru?)
12	July 19, 2017	978-4-08-890699-7	August 20, 2019	978-1-9747-0037-0
123. "Fail" (フェイル, Feiru); 124. "One Thread" (一糸, Isshi); 125. "X"; 126. "Ring" (指輪, Yubiwa); 127. "Beginning" (はじめ, Hajime); 128. "Meal" (膳, Zen); 129. "Suffering" (苦, Ku); 130. "Meaningless" (意味なし, Imi nashi); 131. "Thinking Pig" (考える豚, Kangaeru Buta); 132. "Double Meaning" (二つの意味で, Futatsu no Imi de)
13	October 19, 2017	978-4-08-890758-1	October 15, 2019	978-1-9747-0153-7
133. "Standing Reapers for Three" (3人分の死神を立たせておきました, 3-nin bun no shinigami o tatase te oki mashita); 134. "I Don't Know" (いざ知らず, Iza shira zu); 135. "Night Is Coming" (夜がくる, Yoru ga kuru); 136. "Summoned Courage" (勇むものの, Isamu monono); 137. "Izanagi" (いざなぎ, Izanagi); 138. "Fall from the Tower" (塔から落ちる, Tō kara ochiru); 139. "He Laughs" (彼は笑う, Kare wa warau); 140. "Killing by N" (Nによる殺生, En niyoru sesshō); 141. "Permeate" (染みはたる, Shimi wa taru; "A Sufficient Stain"); 142. "Lament" (愁う, Ureu); 143. "␣"; 144. "a" (a)
14	January 19, 2018	978-4-08-890820-5	December 17, 2019	978-1-9747-0445-3
145. "Title" (タイトル, Taitoru); 146. ":::::"; 147. "1"; 148. "Where Is the Stone" (いしはどこに, Ishi wa doko ni); 149. "Irresistible Force" (破竹, Hachiku); 150. "Ark" (箱舟, Hakofune); 151. "Leave" (出てく, Deteku); 152. "One God" (一柱, Icchū); 153. "One Garbage" (ゴミひとつ, Gomi hitotsu); 154. "Trace" (トレース, Torēsu)
15	March 19, 2018	978-4-08-890881-6	February 18, 2020	978-1-9747-0456-9
155. "Several Lies" (いくつかの嘘, Ikutsu ka no uso); 156. "Inside" (うちがわ, Uchigawa); 157. "Symbol" (しるし, Shirushi); 158. "Righteousness" (是, Ze); 159. "S" (S, Esu); 160. "Mourning" (喪, Mo); 161. "Come, Sweet Hour of Death" (来たれ、汝甘き死の時よ, Kitare, nanji kan ki shi no toki yo); 162. "Pomegranate in Hand" (ざくろ手に, Zakuro te ni); 163. "Indestructible" (不壊, Fue); 164. "The White One" (しろい者, Shiroi mono)
16	July 19, 2018	978-4-08-891050-5	April 21, 2020	978-1-9747-0742-3
165. "Thin Ice" (うすらい, Usurai); 166. "et" (et, e to or ī tī); 167. "Transparent" (とうめい, Tōmei); 168. "Neo Edo" (匂へど, Nio edo); 169. "To the Mob" (群因たちへ, Gun'in tachi e); 170. "Evolution and Stars" (進化と星, Shinka to hoshi); 171. "Disappear" (きえる, Kieru); 172. "Enough" (十分, Jūbun); 173. "Sidestep" (去なさん, Inasan); 174. "Do" (する, Suru); 175. "King of Insects" (虫の王, Mushi no Ō); 176. "Lose" (喪う, Ushinau); 177. "Outcome" (転帰, Tenki); 178. "White and Rabbit" (白と兎, Shiro to usagi); 179. "Goat's Song" (山羊のうた, Yagi no uta)

== Side stories ==
=== Tokyo Ghoul [JACK] ===
The prequel to Tokyo Ghoul focusing on Kishou Arima as a teenager. It was digitally published by Jump Live. It can also be read through Amazon Kindle and other Kindle devices

No.	Original release date	Original ISBN	English release date	English ISBN
1	October 18, 2013	—	September 26, 2017	—

=== Tokyo Ghoul [ZAKKI] ===
A book of illustrations of Tokyo Ghoul wallpaper. It contains, among other things, the Tokyo Ghoul tankōbon cover art.

No.	Original release date	Original ISBN	English release date	English ISBN
1	October 17, 2014	978-4-08-890068-1	November 21, 2017	978-1-4215-9692-1

== Light novels ==
All light novels are written by Shin Towada and illustrated by Sui Ishida.

No.	Title	Original release date	English release date
1	Tokyo Ghoul: Days (東京喰種トーキョーグール［日々］, Tōkyō Gūru［Hibi］)	July 7, 2013; 978-4-08-703296-3	October 18, 2016; 978-1-4215-9057-8
2	Tokyo Ghoul: Void (東京喰種トーキョーグール［空白］, Tōkyō Gūru［Kūhaku］)	July 19, 2014; 978-4-08-703320-5	January 17, 2017; 978-1-4215-9058-5
3	Tokyo Ghoul: Past (東京喰種トーキョーグール［昔日］, Tōkyō Gūru［Sekijitsu］)	December 19, 2014; 978-4-08-703340-3	April 18, 2017; 978-1-4215-9177-3

In December 2016, a Tokyo Ghoul:re novel series written by Shin Towada and illustrated by Sui Ishida began publication by Shueisha in JUMP j-BOOKS weekly magazine.

No.	Title	Japanese release date	Japanese ISBN
1	Tokyo Ghoul:re: quest (東京喰種：re［quest］, Tōkyō Gūru:re: quest)	December 19, 2016	978-4-08-703411-0
