= List of Assassination Classroom episodes =

Cover of the first DVD volume of Assassination Classroom released by Avex Pictures, featuring Nagisa Shiota, Karma Akabane, and Kaede Kayano.

Assassination Classroom is an anime series adapted from Yūsei Matsui's manga series of the same name, which is serialized in Shueisha's Weekly Shounen Jump magazine. The series follows Kunugigaoka Junior High School's Class 3-E as they attempt to assassinate their homeroom teacher, an octopus-like creature named Koro-sensei, before graduation, while also learning some valuable lessons from him. Produced by Lerche and directed by Seiji Kishi, the first season was broadcast in Japan on Fuji TV from January 9 to June 19, 2015. The series was originally licensed in North America by Funimation, who simulcast the subtitled version as it aired and streamed an English dub version from February 18, 2015.

A second season aired between January 7, 2016, and June 30, 2016, and was once again simulcast by Funimation, who began releasing the broadcast dub version from February 10, 2016.

A compilation film of the series and an anime film based on the spin-off manga series, Koro-sensei Q! (殺せんせーQ!), released in Japan on November 19, 2016.

Prior to the television series, an original video animation produced by Brain's Base was screened at Jump Super Anime Tour in October 2013 and was bundled with the seventh manga volume on December 27, 2013. A second OVA episode, produced by the TV series staff, screened at Jump Special Anime Fest in November 2014 and was included with the series' first BD/DVD volume on March 27, 2015.

Adult Swim's Toonami programming block began broadcasting Funimation's English dub of the anime starting on August 30, 2020, and began airing season 2 on January 9, 2022.

== Series overview ==
Season	Episodes	Originally released	
Season	Episodes	First released	Last released
1	22	January 9, 2015	June 19, 2015
2	25	January 7, 2016	June 30, 2016

== Episodes ==
=== Season 1 (2015) ===
Season 1 episodes
No. overall	No. in season	English title (Note: All English titles are taken from Funimation.) Japanese title	Directed by	Storyboarded by	Original release date	English air date
1	1	"Assassination Time"; Transliteration: "Ansatsu no Jikan" (Japanese: 暗殺の時間)	Masahiro Mukai	Seiji Kishi	January 9, 2015	August 30, 2020
2	2	"Baseball Time"; Transliteration: "Yakyū no Jikan" (Japanese: 野球の時間)	Takashi Kobayashi	Takashi Kobayashi	January 16, 2015	September 6, 2020
3	3	"Karma Time"; Transliteration: "Karuma no Jikan" (Japanese: カルマの時間)	Akiyo Ohashi	Takuya Minezawa	January 30, 2015 (Note: The January 23, 2015 television broadcast of episode 3 on Fuji TV was delayed due to [sic] "various circumstances". The 2015 capture of two Japanese nationals by the terrorist organization ISIS has been speculated as one of the reasons.)	September 13, 2020
4	4	"Grown-Up Time"; Transliteration: "Otona no Jikan" (Japanese: 大人の時間)	Yusuke Kamada	Yusuke Kamada	February 6, 2015	September 20, 2020
5	5	"Assembly Time"; Transliteration: "Shūkai no Jikan" (Japanese: 集会の時間)	Noriyuki Noya	Goichi Iwahata	February 13, 2015	September 27, 2020
6	6	"Test Time"; Transliteration: "Tesuto no Jikan" (Japanese: テストの時間)	Takashi Kobayashi	Takashi Kobayashi	February 20, 2015	October 4, 2020
7	7	"School Trip Time/1st Period"; Transliteration: "Shūgakuryokō no Jikan: Ichi-Jikan-me" (Japanese: 修学旅行の時間・1時間目)	Takashi Kobayashi	Takashi Kobayashi	February 27, 2015	October 11, 2020
8	8	"School Trip Time/2nd Period"; Transliteration: "Shūgakuryokō no Jikan: Ni-Jikan-me" (Japanese: 修学旅行の時間・2時間目)	Yusuke Kamada	Goichi Iwahata	March 6, 2015	October 18, 2020
9	9	"Transfer Student Time"; Transliteration: "Tenkōsei no Jikan" (Japanese: 転校生の時間)	Kinome Yu	Noriaki Saito	March 13, 2015	October 25, 2020
10	10	"L and R Time"; Transliteration: "Eru Āru no Jikan" (Japanese: LRの時間)	Itoga Shintaro	Kinji Yoshimoto	March 20, 2015	November 8, 2020
11	11	"Transfer Student Time/2nd Period"; Transliteration: "Tenkōsei no Jikan: Ni-Jikan-me" (Japanese: 転校生の時間・2時間目)	Kinome Yu	Goichi Iwahata	March 27, 2015	November 15, 2020
12	12	"Ball Game Tournament Time"; Transliteration: "Kyūgi Taikai no Jikan" (Japanese: 球技大会の時間)	Itoga Shintaro	Takehiko Matsumoto	April 10, 2015	November 22, 2020
13	13	"Talent Time"; Transliteration: "Sainō no Jikan" (Japanese: 才能の時間)	Daisei Fukuoka	Noriaki Saito	April 17, 2015	December 6, 2020
14	14	"Vision Time"; Transliteration: "Bijon no Jikan" (Japanese: ビジョンの時間)	Akiyo Ohashi	Hiroshi Kugimiya	April 24, 2015	December 13, 2020
15	15	"End-of-Term Time"; Transliteration: "Kimatsu no Jikan" (Japanese: 期末の時間)	Fumio Ito	Noriaki Saito	May 1, 2015	January 3, 2021
16	16	"School's Out/1st Term"; Transliteration: "Shūgyō no Jikan: Ichi-gakki" (Japanese: 終業の時間・1学期)	Takashi Kobayashi	Takashi Kobayashi	May 8, 2015	January 10, 2021
17	17	"Island Time"; Transliteration: "Shima no Jikan" (Japanese: 島の時間)	Itoga Shintaro	Hiroshi Kugimiya	May 15, 2015	January 17, 2021
18	18	"Action Time"; Transliteration: "Kekkō no Jikan" (Japanese: 決行の時間)	Daisei Fukuoka	Yoshito Nishoji Daisei Fukuoka	May 22, 2015	January 24, 2021
19	19	"Pandemonium Time"; Transliteration: "Fukuma no Jikan" (Japanese: 伏魔の時間)	Yusuke Kamada	Yusuke Kamada	May 29, 2015	January 31, 2021
20	20	"Karma Time/2nd Period"; Transliteration: "Karuma no Jikan: Ni-Jikan-me" (Japanese: カルマの時間・2時間目)	Akiyo Ohashi	Shinichi Masaki	June 5, 2015	February 7, 2021
21	21	"XX Time"; Transliteration: "Takaoka no Jikan" (Japanese: 鷹岡の時間)	Wada Heisaku	Wada Heisaku	June 12, 2015	February 14, 2021
22	22	"Nagisa Time"; Transliteration: "Nagisa no Jikan" (Japanese: 渚の時間)	Yoshito Nishoji Itoga Shintaro	Yoshito Nishoji Daisei Fukuoka	June 19, 2015	February 21, 2021

=== Season 2 (2016) ===
No. overall	No. in season	English title Japanese title	Directed by	Storyboarded by	Original release date	English air date (Note: Adult Swim lists the season as premiering on January 8, 2022 at 12:30 a.m. (24:30) EST/PST, which is effectively January 9.)
23	1	"Summer Festival Time"; Transliteration: "Natsumatsuri no Jikan" (Japanese: 夏祭りの時間)	Yoshito Nishoji	Yoshito Nishoji	January 7, 2016	January 9, 2022
24	2	"Kaede Time"; Transliteration: "Kaede no Jikan" (Japanese: カエデの時間)	Itoga Shintaro	Noriaki Saito	January 14, 2016	January 9, 2022
25	3	"Itona Horibe Time"; Transliteration: "Horibe Itona no Jikan" (Japanese: 堀部糸成の時間)	Rei Yabana	Tokuaki Saito Yoshito Jinshoji	January 21, 2016	January 16, 2022
26	4	"Spinning Time"; Transliteration: "Tsumugu Jikan" (Japanese: 紡ぐ時間)	Kinome Yu	Kinome Yu	January 28, 2016	January 16, 2022
27	5	"Leader Time"; Transliteration: "Rīdā no Jikan" (Japanese: リーダーの時間)	Yoshimichi Hirai	Yoshimichi Hirai	February 4, 2016	January 23, 2022
28	6	"Before & After Time"; Transliteration: "Bifō Afutā no Jikan" (Japanese: ビフォーアフターの時間)	Fumio Ito	Shinichi Masaki	February 11, 2016	January 30, 2022
29	7	"Reaper Time, Part 1"; Transliteration: "Shinigami no Jikan Zenpen" (Japanese: 死神の時間 前編)	Noriyuki Noya	Tokuaki Saito Yoshito Jinshoji	February 18, 2016	February 6, 2022
30	8	"Reaper Time, Part 2"; Transliteration: "Shinigami no Jikan Kōhen" (Japanese: 死神の時間 後編)	Nobu Ishida	Takehiko Matsumoto	February 25, 2016	February 13, 2022
31	9	"Round Two Time"; Transliteration: "Ni-Shū-me no Jikan" (Japanese: 2周目の時間)	Ken Ando	Noriaki Saito	March 3, 2016	February 20, 2022
32	10	"School Festival Time"; Transliteration: "Gakuen-sai no Jikan" (Japanese: 学園祭の時間)	Itoga Shintaro	Hiroshi Kugimiya	March 10, 2016	February 27, 2022
33	11	"End-of-Term Time, 2nd Period"; Transliteration: "Kimatsu no Jikan Ni-Jikan-me" (Japanese: 期末の時間 2時間目)	Kinome Yu	Kinome Yu	March 17, 2016	March 6, 2022
34	12	"Think Outside the Box Time"; Transliteration: "Kūkan no Jikan" (Japanese: 空間の時間)	Yoshimichi Hirai	Daisei Fukuoka	March 24, 2016	March 13, 2022
35	13	"Let Live Time"; Transliteration: "Ikasu Jikan" (Japanese: 生かす時間)	Takashi Okawara	Noriaki Saito	March 31, 2016	March 20, 2022
36	14	"Secret Identity Time"; Transliteration: "Shōtai no Jikan" (Japanese: 正体の時間)	Atsuko Tonomizu	Shinichi Tokaibayashi	April 7, 2016	March 27, 2022
37	15 (Note: Change title to "Assassination Classroom: FINAL Season".)	"Confession Time"; Transliteration: "Kokuhaku no Jikan" (Japanese: 告白の時間)	Fumio Maezono	Shinichi Masaki	April 21, 2016 (Note: The April 14, 2016 television broadcast of episode 15 was delayed by a week due to news coverage of an earthquake in the Kumamoto Prefecture.)	April 3, 2022
38	16	"Past Time"; Transliteration: "Kako no Jikan" (Japanese: 過去の時間)	Fumio Ito	Noriaki Saito	April 28, 2016	April 10, 2022
39	17	"Discord Time"; Transliteration: "Bunretsu no Jikan" (Japanese: 分裂の時間)	Takashi Okawara	Tomohisa Taguchi	May 5, 2016	April 17, 2022
40	18	"Outcome Time"; Transliteration: "Kekka no Jikan" (Japanese: 結果の時間)	Takahiro Majima	Shinichi Tokaibayashi	May 12, 2016	April 24, 2022
41	19	"Outer Space Time"; Transliteration: "Uchū no Jikan" (Japanese: 宇宙の時間)	Itoga Shintaro	Shinichi Tokaibayashi	May 19, 2016	May 1, 2022
42	20	"Valentine's Day Time"; Transliteration: "Barentain no Jikan" (Japanese: バレンタインの時間)	Akira Shimizu	Shinichi Tokaibayashi	May 26, 2016	May 8, 2022
43	21	"Trust Time"; Transliteration: "Shinrai no Jikan" (Japanese: 信頼の時間)	Nobu Ishida	Noriaki Saito	June 2, 2016	May 15, 2022
44	22	"Happy Birthday Time"; Transliteration: "Happī Bāsudei no Jikan" (Japanese: ハッピーバースデイの時間)	Yoshimichi Hirai	Goichi Iwahata	June 9, 2016	May 22, 2022
45	23	"Final Boss Time"; Transliteration: "Rasubosu no Jikan" (Japanese: ラスボスの時間)	Fumio Ito	Shinichi Tokaibayashi	June 16, 2016	May 29, 2022
46	24	"Graduation Time"; Transliteration: "Sotsugyō no Jikan" (Japanese: 卒業の時間)	Yoshito Nishoji	Noriaki Saito	June 23, 2016	June 5, 2022
47	25	"Future Time"; Transliteration: "Mirai no Jikan" (Japanese: 未来の時間)	Takashi Okawara	Noriaki Saito Akito Yoshihide Yuuzumi	June 30, 2016	June 12, 2022

== OVAs ==
No.	Title	Directed by	Storyboarded by	Original release date
OVA	"Jump Super Anime Tour Special"	Keiji Gotoh	Keiji Gotoh	October 6, 2013 (event); December 27, 2013 (DVD)
Class 3-E participate in a school trip to Kyoto, where they plan to make use of a sniper to assassinate Koro-sensei. After the class is divided into groups, Nagisa's group is ambushed by another school's delinquents, who knock out the boys and kidnap the girls. However, thanks to an elaborate guidebook that Koro-sensei had prepared for the trip, Nagisa and the others find their kidnapped classmates and hold off the delinquents until Koro-sensei arrives. Meanwhile, the sniper, Red Eye, having failed to assassinate Koro-sensei several times, ends up sharing a hot pot with him and gives up on his target.
0	"Meeting Time"; Transliteration: "Deai no Jikan" (Japanese: 出会いの時間)	Takashi Kobayashi	Noriaki Saito	November 9, 2014 (event); March 27, 2015 (BD/DVD)
Koro-sensei reminisces about his first meeting with Karasuma, where they first butted heads and fought against each other, ultimately coming to respect one another. However, Karasuma tells him not to lie and points out that their actual meeting wasn't nearly as eventful.
