= List of Neuro: Supernatural Detective episodes =

Cover of the first Neuro: Supernatural Detective DVD, released by VAP on December 21, 2007

The anime series Neuro: Supernatural Detective is based on the manga series of the same name written and illustrated by Yusei Matsui, directed by Hiroshi Kōjina and co-produced by Madhouse, Nippon Television, Shueisha, D.N. Dream Partners and VAP. The series follows Neuro Nogami: a demon who depends on mysteries for sustenance and, after solving all the mysteries in the demonic world, comes to Earth to solve its mysteries. Nero does this undetected by using a detective office and a high-school student, Yako Katsuragi, as a facade.

Production of the Neuro: Supernatural Detective anime was announced in July 2007. The series originally aired between October 3, 2007, and March 26, 2008, on Nippon Television; (Note: Nippon TV listed the series air dates on Tuesday at 25:29, which is effectively Wednesday at 1:29 a.m. JST.) it was later broadcast by four NTV affiliates: HTV, YTV, CTV and STV. The episodes were later combined into nine DVDs, released by VAP from December 21, 2007, to August 27, 2008; VAP re-released all the episodes in a DVD box set on September 30, 2008.

Viz Media announced its acquisition of Neuro: Supernatural Detective for North American release in the March 2011 issue of its magazine, Shonen Jump. The company renamed the series from Majin Tantei Nōgami Neuro to Neuro: Supernatural Detective, streaming the English-subtitled episodes from February 18, 2011, to July 1, 2011, on its website VizAnime.com and Hulu.

The series has two pieces of theme music: "Dirty", by Nightmare, the series' opening theme, and "Kodoku no Hikari" (孤独のヒカリ; lit. 'Light of Solitude'), by Seira Kagami, the ending theme.

== Production team ==
Neuro: Supernatural Detective was originally created by Yusei Matsui as a manga; the anime series was animated by Madhouse and directed by Hiroshi Kōjina. The series was composed by Satoshi Suzuki, its characters were designed by Mika Takahashi in collaboration with Studio Live staff, and Takahashi and Ai Kikuchi were the principal animation directors. Ayako Kurata directed the opening theme, and Tomohiko Itō directed the ending theme; their animation was directed by Takahashi and Kikuchi, respectively. Hidetoshi Kaneko was the art director, Yoshinori Horikawa coordinated the colors, Kōji Takahashi directed the photography and Satoshi Terauchi edited the series. The sound was directed by Toshihiko Nakajima, recorded by Fujio Yamada at Tricycle Studio and sound effects were created by Yasunori Ogata at Sound Box.

== Episodes ==
No.	Title	Directed by	Written by	Animation directed by	Original release date	References
1	"Eat"; Transliteration: "Shoku" (Japanese: 食【しょく】)	Tomohiko Itō	Satoshi Suzuki	Mika Takahashi	October 3, 2007	
Neuro Nogami, Yako Katsuragi, and two detectives named Eishi Sasazuka and Jun Ishigaki are asked by a restaurant owner to investigate threats he received; during their discussion, the chef is found dead in the kitchen. After investigating, Neuro reveals the owner to be the culprit. He explains the chef was killed before their arrival and was propped up by ropes held together with a frozen fruit to give the impression he was still alive; when the fruit thawed, the body would fall and give the owner an alibi. The owner confesses after the rolling pin used for the murder is found, explaining how the victim learned the owner was using drugs in the food, and is apprehended by Neuro when he attempts to attack the group.
2	"Community"; Transliteration: "Komyuniti" (Japanese: 集【コミュニティ】)	Kentarō Nakamura	Sōtarō Hayashi	Kyōko Takeuchi	October 10, 2007	
Neuro and Yako take a case with no witnesses, although the crime scene is a crowded street crossing. When they discover that all the victims use the community site Links, Yako joins it as bait, saying in her profile that she knows who the murderer is. At the intersection, Hime, Links' leader, tries to kill Yako; however, Shinobu Godai, Neuro and Yako's co-worker, intervenes and is wounded. Because they could not record the moment that Hime injured Godai, they summon her to their office and trick her into admitting that she is the murderer.
3	"Poison"; Transliteration: "Doku" (Japanese: 笑【どく】)	Yukiyo Teramoto	Ryū Tamura	Tōru Shigeta	October 17, 2007	
Yako finds a body cemented into a wall, with a ponytail showing. Thanks to Neuro's radiating demonic power, the body partially develops sentience. Neuro hires the hair, who calls herself Akane, promising he will solve the mystery of her murder. Yako later attends a comedy show where members of the audience begin randomly dying of what appears to be laughter. With Akane's help, Neuro discovers that the murderer is a stage assistant of the comedian who killed the members of the audience by freezing poison into ropes on the ceiling and dripping it into the audience's bentos.
4	"Dog"; Transliteration: "Inu" (Japanese: 犬【いぬ】)	Makoto Nagao	Satoshi Suzuki	Yoshikatsu Inoue	October 24, 2007	
A serial bomber named "Histerrier" is bombing buildings and landmarks. At a crime scene, Neuro and Yako meet Usui, Sasazuka's boss, who doubts Yako's deductive ability. Despite Usui's threats Neuro and Yako discover the next targeted building, deactivating the bomb to lure the bomber. They are successful, and the criminal is a woman known as Histerrier. After deactivating a second bomb with Sasazuka's help, Histerrier is arrested.
5	"Office"; Transliteration: "Jimusho" (Japanese: 貸【じむしょ】)	Kazuhiro Yoneda	Sōtarō Hayashi	Hatsue Koizumi	October 31, 2007	
The episode recounts how Neuro and Yako found an office and met Godai; tired of having to summon Yako for every mystery, Neuro decides to open an office. In an office, he senses a yakuza of which Godai was a former member. After learning that the previous office manager had been killed, Neuro offers to solve the mystery in exchange for the office. After he discovers that the murderer was the new boss, Neuro uses his demonic power to persuade the yakuza to give him their office.
6	"Long Friends"; Transliteration: "Nagai tomodachi" (Japanese: 髪【ながいともだち】)	Katsutoshi Sasaki	Ryū Tamura	Tenshō Satō	November 7, 2007	
Yako and Akane want to solve a mystery where murdered women's heads have their styled hair caked in blood. Neuro says that they should solve it themselves, and it would be a chance for Yako to "evolve". By fusing Akane with herself, Yako has beautiful hair with which she can lure the murderer. Mesmerized by Akane, the man asks Yako to go to his apartment and restrains them there. Before Yako can be harmed Neuro rescues her, although he is disappointed with her.
7	"Box"; Transliteration: "Hako" (Japanese: 箱【はこ】)	Tomohiko Itō	Satoshi Suzuki	Daisuke Yoshida	November 14, 2007	(Note: VAP's site erroneously credited the sixth episode's for the seventh episode too. However, the credits taken from 箱【はこ】. Neuro: Supernatural Detective. Episode 7 (in Japanese). November 14, 2007. Nippon Television. shows: 脚本 鈴木 智 絵コンテ/演出 伊藤 智彦 作画監督 吉田 大輔)
Police on patrol find a red box. In it are the remaining pieces of a body murdered by someone called Phantom Thief Sai. Meanwhile, Yako and Neuro are hired by a man who is suspicious of his son's actions after he came home with blood on his jacket. Neuro and Yako tail the man to a destroyed building where they discover he is a fan obsessed with Phantom Thief Sai. The young man has been practicing how to kill properly in order to become him. When the police try to arrest him the real Sai appears. The copycat Sai is then killed by the real one, only for Neuro to stab Sai in the chest. Sai agrees to go with the police, killing them moments later and telling Neuro that he will be back.
8	"Future"; Transliteration: "Mirai" (Japanese: 夢【みらい】)	Yukiyo Teramoto	Takashi Tsuzuki	Tōru Shigeta	November 21, 2007	
Yako has a nightmare about her encounter with Sai, and a serial killer named Cop-Killer is on the loose. When the police receive a letter with a suspect's location a detective guns him down, claiming self-defense. Neuro reveals that the detective planted evidence incriminating the other man, and he is the real Cop-Killer who committed his crimes for the sheer thrill of making it look like a police drama.
9	"Tie"; Transliteration: "Shime" (Japanese: 締【しめ】)	Kentaro Nakamura	Sōtarō Hayashi	Kyōko Takeuchi	November 28, 2007	
Aya Asia, a singer whose manager and producer have been murdered, asks for Yako and Neuro's help to find their killer, explaining that the police think the deaths were suicides and she has received pictures of herself covered in red paint or blood. Yako thinks the stalker who sent the pictures is the murderer. The stalker stops Aya on her way to her car in an underground parking lot, but Aya is Yako in disguise and the stalker is taken into custody.
10	"Alone"; Transliteration: "Hitorikiri" (Japanese: 一【ひとりきり】)	Makoto Nagao	Sōtarō Hayashi	Yoshikatsu Inoue	December 5, 2007	
Aya thanks the detectives and Yako for solving the case, but Neuro says the stalker is not the murderer. During a concert, Neuro throws Yako onto the stage to accuse Aya of the murders. Aya confesses, saying that she needs to be lonely to write songs for lonely people, and peacefully surrenders as her fans cheer. Yako is now famous, since she has appeared on television and solved a mystery concerning a world-famous singer.
11	"Limelight"; Transliteration: "Gyakkō" (Japanese: 光【きゃっこう】)	Kazuhiro Yoneda	Satoshi Suzuki, Yoshitaka Shisido	Hatsue Koizumi, Masaru Kitao	December 12, 2007	(Note: VAP's site credited only Hatsue Koizumi. However, the credits taken from 光【きゃっこう】. Neuro: Supernatural Detective. Episode 11 (in Japanese). December 12, 2007. Nippon Television. list Hatsue Koizumi (小泉 初栄) and Masaru Kitao (北尾 勝) as Animation Director (作画監督))
An actress' agent seeks Neuro and Yako's help, fearing that her client would be accused of murdering another actress because of their rivalry. They learn that cameras did not film anyone entering the room until the victim's agent found her body. The room is on the 25th floor, and the police think it would be impossible to enter through the window. Neuro, however, says that the agent who hired them is a former athlete and that she committed the murder.
12	"Statue"; Transliteration: "Zō" (Japanese: 像【ぞう】)	Katsutoshi Sasaki	Satoshi Suzuki	Takuya Wakano	December 19, 2007	
Sai asks Neuro, Yako and the police to solve the case of a sculptor who was crushed by his statue. When they visit the sculptor's house, they find his widow dead from the same cause. Neuro says that a family member is responsible for both murders, and they would find the culprit that night. He asks Sasazuka to dispense the police, and Neuro and Yako catch the family's eldest brother at the crime scene. Neuro argues with him while Sai, hidden, watches.
13	"Sai"; Transliteration: "Sai" (Japanese: X【サイ】)	Tomohiko Itō	Satoshi Suzuki	Daisuke Yoshida	December 26, 2007	
The elder brother admits that he is the culprit, and Sai wounds Neuro and Sasazuka after the latter calls for help. When help arrives, Sai challenges Neuro to catch him. Neuro chases Sai, and fights with him; meanwhile, Sasazuka says that Sai could be Yako's father's murderer. With Yako and Godai's help Neuro drops Sai from a great height, and he disappears.
14	"Dream-Like"; Transliteration: "Yume kibun" (Japanese: 旅【ゆめきぶん】)	Kazuhisa Ōno	Takashi Tsuzuki	Kyōko Takeuchi	January 10, 2008	
Yako receives tickets to an onsen. During the trip Neuro, Yako and Godai meet a group of college students, one of whom is an American exchange student. The American attracts the others' attention by knocking at the door of a closed room, and Neuro, Yako, Godai, and the students find a girl and poison gas in the room. The apparent suicide is really a murder, committed by the rebuffed American student.
15	"Dragon"; Transliteration: "Ryū" (Japanese: 竜【りゅう】)	Yukiyo Teramoto	Masahiro Yokotani	Tōru Shigeta	January 16, 2008	
A fatal car accident occurs, and a witness reports seeing the silhouette of a dragon-like creature that is the subject of a local legend. Capitalizing on the legend, two men open a dinosaur museum selling items to tourists. When one of the men is found wounded, the monster is suspected. Neuro proves that the men projected the monster's image to attract attention, and one killed the other who did not want to continue after the accident.
16	"Spring"; Transliteration: "Haru" (Japanese: 春【はる】)	Makoto Nagao	Sōtarō Hayashi	Yoshikatsu Inoue	January 23, 2008	
Neuro solves an arson, but Yako notes that the arsonist has no motive. Police detective Yūya Higuchi confirms Yako's observation, saying that the arsonist was controlled by an experimental "electronic drug". The neuroscientist who created the drug is killed by agents of HAL, an artificial intelligence he also created. When Neuro enters the digital world, he is apparently killed by HAL's sphinx bodyguards.
17	"Chase"; Transliteration: "Cheisu" (Japanese: 追【チェイス】)	Makoto Nagao	Sōtarō Hayashi	Michiyo Sakurai	January 30, 2008	
Neuro re-materializes in the real world, deducing that the sphinxes are data uploaded from supercomputers in the city; when he finds one at a research facility, he destroys it. HAL uses the drug on Higuchi, who helps him create a new electronic drug which works faster but does not last as long. Another sphinx is put on a truck driven by Higuchi. During a chase, Higuchi uses a bridge of people to cross a chasm but Neuro crashes into it.
18	"Key"; Transliteration: "Kagi" (Japanese: 鍵【かぎ】)	Kazuhiro Yoneda	Ryū Tamura	Hatsue Koizumi	February 6, 2008	
Before the crash, Neuro throws Yako safely over the bridge. He fights electronically-controlled people until Higuchi activates speakers to broadcast sound to power them. When Yako disables the speakers with Higuchi's iPod, Neuro defeats the humans. When he tries to get to HAL and discovers he is password-protected, he collapses from exhaustion and Yako must find the password. Meanwhile, HAL takes over an aircraft carrier and orders the loading of supercomputers.
19	"Two"; Transliteration: "Futari" (Japanese: 2【ふたり】)	Tomohiko Itō	Takashi Tsuzuki	Daisuke Yoshida	February 13, 2008	
Neuro, Yako and Godai arrive at the aircraft carrier; Neuro enters the digital world to pursue HAL, while Godai destroys the sphinx system. HAL is protected by a password which, if typed incorrectly, will send nuclear missiles to destroy Japan. Yako enters the password, allowing Neuro to immobilize HAL. In the real world, the electronic-drug-controlled humans are defeated by Neuro and HAL gives Yako the electronic-drug vaccine. His last request is to be deleted before his backup data boots up, making him continue his plan.
20	"Woman"; Transliteration: "Onna" (Japanese: 机【おんな】)	Tomoki Takuno	Ryū Tamura	Kyōko Takeuchi	February 20, 2008	
Yako sees Sai, and follows him until he disappears into a house where a man is found dead from a neurotoxin on a desk. Neuro and Yako talk with the desk's carpenter, who tells them about similar cases. The carpenter is arrested after his former apprentice reveals that the desk has a hidden device, and the carpenter thinks that his best works are like beautiful women. Neuro reveals that the apprentice poisoned the victims, telling them that the antidote is in the desk to pretend that the desk killed them.
21	"Beauty"; Transliteration: "Bi" (Japanese: 整【び】)	Makoto Nagao	Satoshi Suzuki	Yoshikatsu Inoue, Masakuni Kaneko	February 27, 2008	
Two bodies with burned faces are found by the police; after facial reconstruction, they look identical to the wife of a plastic surgeon. The surgeon has performed several surgeries on his wife to make her look like his former love. When she discovers that her husband is seeing another woman, she kills her; when she discovers there is another woman who looks like her, she kills her too. After Neuro solves the mystery, Sasazuka says that Yako's mother was arrested after flying to South America.
22	"Witch"; Transliteration: "Majo" (Japanese: 女【まじょ】)	Eiko Nishi	Satoshi Suzuki	Shinobu Nishiyama	March 5, 2008	
Reporter Mio Kakei tells Yako that her mother is accused of killing a man who promised to show her pictures of alleged witch Seiren, but did not. Mio and Yako are later kidnapped by an apparent guerrilla and rescued by Neuro and Godai. The guerrilla is opposed to a government project to install gas-lined pipes in the ruins containing Seiren's remains. The chief archaeologist who found her remains tells them that a Shirato village's priest imprisoned Seiren and her child in the ruins, torturing her to death. The possible father of her child is a Japanese architect, who Yako thinks may be her father.
23	"Sai"; Transliteration: "Sai" (Japanese: 責【さい】)	Yukiyo Teramoto	Satoshi Suzuki	Tōru Shigeta	March 12, 2008	
Sasazuka and Ishigaki arrive in South America; Neuro accuses the archaeologist, saying that he wanted to prevent the spread of the witch's legend because it would stop the pipeline's construction and keep him from making money. Yako, Godai and Mio reach Shirato, where the priest detains Mio, saying she is the witch. Yako and Godai escape, discovering that the guerrillas are Sharato's villagers trying to capture the witch. When Yako and Godai sneak through the ruins and find a ritual for the witch, they are beaten by the villagers.
24	"Sai (Sealed)"; Transliteration: "Sai" (Japanese: 塞【さい】)	Tomohiko Itō	Satoshi Suzuki	Daisuke Yoshida	March 19, 2008	
Sai reveals himself as Mio in disguise, killing all the ritual participants and taking Yako with him. He ties Yako up at an altar used to seal demon power. Sai says that he pretended to be Sairen to attract Yako's mother's attention and, therefore, Neuro and Yako's, trying to see Neuro's entrails before his memories are extinguished. Godai tells Neuro what happened; they go with Sasazuka to meet Sai, who overpowers Sasazuka and stabs Neuro.
25	"Sai (Final)"; Transliteration: "Sai" (Japanese: 塞【さい】)	Kazuhiro Yoneda	Satoshi Suzuki	Hatsue Koizumi	March 26, 2008	
Neuro is about to be cut open by Sai when Yako, Sasazuka and Godai stop him. Yako reveals that Sai is Seiren's child, who becomes a monster after seeing his mother's murder. The altar is now the entrance to hell, reawakening Neuro who defeats Sai. Neuro says goodbye to Yako as he flies toward the portal, using all his power to prevent hell from destroying the world. Yako is reunited with her mother, and Sai goes away. Some time later, Yako is at the now-empty office; Akane is "dead" and Godai gone, since Neuro is not there to keep him. However, Neuro returns since there are still mysteries to be solved.

== DVD releases ==
VAP released nine DVDs between December 21, 2007, and August 27, 2008. A DVD box set with all 25 episodes was released on September 30, 2008.

VAP (Japan, Region 2 DVD)
Volume	Episodes	Release date	Ref.
Volume 1	1–3	December 21, 2007	
Volume 2	4–6	January 23, 2008	
Volume 3	7–9	February 27, 2008	
Volume 4	10–12	March 26, 2008	
Volume 5	13–15	April 23, 2008	
Volume 6	16–18	May 21, 2008	
Volume 7	19–21	June 25, 2008	
Volume 8	22–23	July 25, 2008	
Volume 9	24-25	August 27, 2008	
Box	1–26	September 30, 2008	

== See also ==
- List of Neuro: Supernatural Detective chapters
