= List of Neuro: Supernatural Detective chapters =

First tankōbon volume cover, published by Shueisha on July 4, 2005

The Japanese manga series Neuro: Supernatural Detective was written and illustrated by Yūsei Matsui. The series follows Neuro Nōgami, a demon who feeds on mysteries, as he comes to Earth after solving every mystery in the demon world. To remain unnoticed, he obligates a high school student, Yako Katsuragi, to establish a detective agency.

The manga was first published in Shueisha's magazine Akamaru Jump in the 2004 summer issue as a one-shot; it won the Jump Jūni Ketsu Shinjin Manga Award, and was "extremely well received". A second one-shot was released on September 6, 2004, in Weekly Shōnen Jump. It was regularly serialized in Weekly Shōnen Jump between February 21, 2005, and April 20, 2009.

The 202 chapters were collected and published into 23 tankōbon volumes by Shueisha starting on July 4, 2005, with the last volume being released on August 4, 2009. The chapter names are originally named in a format "kanji [kana]", in which the kana does not necessarily serves as a furigana to the kanji, but provides different titles sometimes. When this occurs, it is indicated by the brackets in the English titles. Due to the absence of furigana for the kanji, only its kana titles are in romaji.

The manga was adapted into a 25-episode anime series co-produced by Madhouse, Nippon Television (NTV), Shueisha, D.N. Dream Partners and VAP that aired in Japan on NTV from October 2, 2007, to March 25, 2008. The manga has also been licensed in several countries, among them in France by Glénat, in Hong Kong by Culturecom, in Italy and Spain by Planeta DeAgostini, in South Korea by Seoul Media Group, and in Taiwan by Tong Li Publishing.

== Volume list ==
No.	Title	Japanese release date	Japanese ISBN
1	Brain Eater; Nōzui no Kūfuku (脳髄の空腹)	July 4, 2005	978-4-08-873834-5
1. "Hand" (手【て】, "Te"); 2. "Depression" (凹【へこみ】, "Hekomi"); 3. "Face" (表【かお】, "Kao"); 4. "Meal" (食【しょく】, "Shoku"); 5. "Meal [Flavor]" (食【あじ】, "Aji"); 6. "Meal [Prey]" (食【えじき】, "Ejiki"); 7. "Nest [House]" (巣【いえ】, "Ie")
High-school student Yako Katsuragi's father is murdered but deemed suicide by the authorities. Yako is in disbelief her father would ever commit suicide. During her time of mourning she is greeted by a demon named Neuro who eats mysteries and claims he can solve the mystery of Seiichi Katsuragi's murder.
2	Lonely Diva; Hitorikiri no Utahime (ひとりきりの歌姫)	September 2, 2005	978-4-08-873854-3
8. "High [Point of View]" (高【かくど】, "Kakudo"); 9. "Cord" (紐【ひも】, "Himo"); 10. "Chick" (雛【ひな】, "Hina"); 11. "1 [The First One]" (一【ひとりめ】, "Hitorime"); 12. "Fishing" (釣【つり】, "Tsuri"); 13. "Constriction" (締【しめ】, "Shime"); 14. "Inquiry" (問【といあわせ】, "Toiawase"); 15. "1 [Alone]" (一【ひとりきり】, "Hitorikiri"); 16. "Filming" (撮【とり】, "Tori")
Neuro and Yako make a deal with illegitimate businessmen to acquire an office.
3	Unknown "X"; Senmeinaru "X" (鮮明なる"X")	November 4, 2005	978-4-08-873875-8
17. "Look [Show me]" (見【みせろ】, "Misero"); 18. "Box" (箱【はこ】, "Hako"); 19. "Tail" (尾【しっぽ】, "Shippo"); 20. "Box [Person]" (箱【ひと】, "Hito"); 21. "Difference" (差【ちがい】, "Chigai"); 22. "X [Unknown]" (X【アンノウン】, "An'nōn"); 23. "Bounce" (跳【はね】, "Hane"); 24. "Upper [Career]" (上【キャリア】, "Kyaria"); 25. "Bomb" (爆【ボム】, "Bomu")
Yako after solving a double murder case surrounding the popular singer Aya Asia, has become famous herself. Due to her new fame, Yako gets a stalker. During this time a string of murders involving putting the victim in a sort of "red box" has the authorities baffled.
4	Bomb Dog; Inu ni Bakudan (犬に爆弾)	January 5, 2006	978-4-08-874007-2
26. "Order [Row]" (順【ならび】, "Narabi"); 27. "Bet" (賭【かけ】, "Kake"); 28. "Dog" (犬【いぬ】, "Inu"); 29. "Reveal" (露【あらわ】, "Arawa"); 30. "Confidential" (（秘）【まるひ】, "Maruhi"); 31. "Travel [Dreamy]" (旅【ゆめきぶん】, "Yume Kibun"); 32. "Breath" (息【いき】, "Iki"); 33. "Comfort" (慰【なぐさめ】, Nagusame); 34. "Outside" (外【そと】, "Soto")
A mad bomber is on the loose going by the alias "Histerrier". Yako wins tickets to a mountain onsen.
5	Armament Brothers; Yoroi no Kyōdai (鎧の兄弟)	April 4, 2006	978-4-08-874043-0
35. "Rank" (格【ランク】, "Ranku"); 36. "Long Ago" (昔【むかし】, "Mukashi"); 37. "Broad" (広【ひろさ】, "Hirosa"); 38. "Face" (顔【かお】, "Kao"); 39. "Oppose [Betrayal]" (反【うらぎり】, "Uragiri"); 40. "Reverse [Other Other Side]" (裏【うらのうら】, "Ura no Ura"); 41. "Cold" (寒【さむさ】, "Samusa"); 42. "Under [Subordinate]" (下【ぶか】, "Buka"); 43. "Under [Brother]" (下【おとうと】, "Otōto")
6	Hair, Punched and Paulownia; Kami to Hasami to Kiritori-sen (髪とハサミとキリトリ線)	June 2, 2006	978-4-08-874113-0
44. "Hair [A Long Friend]" (髪【ながいともだち】, "Nagai Tomodachi"); 45. "Bite" (噛【かみ】, "Kami"); 46. "Protect" (守【かみ】, "Kami"); 47. "God" (神【かみ】, "Kami"); 48. "Song [Aya]" (歌【アヤ】, "Aya"); 49. "Wall" (壁【かべ】, "Kabe"); 50. "Statue" (像【ぞう】, "Zō"); 51. "Moon" (月【つき】, "Tsuki"); 52. "Shelter [Parasite]" (宿【きせい】, "Kisei")
7	Love from the Cell; Saibō Kara Ai o Komete (細胞から愛をこめて)	August 4, 2006	978-4-08-874143-7
53. "Between" (間【あいだ】, "Aida"); 54. "Shadow" (影【かげ】, "Kage"); 55. "Branch" (枝【えだ】, "Eda"); 56. "O [Ring]" (◯【えん】, "En"); 57. "X [Failure]" (X【しっぱい】, "Shippai"); 58. "X [Chromosome]" (X【せんしょくたい】, "Senshokutai"); 59. "Hand+" (手【て+】, "Te+"); 60. "Test" (試【テスト】, "Tesuto"); 61. "Brain" (脳【のう】, "Nō")
Neuro and X do battle over Neuro's insides.
8	A Pyromaniac Made; Tsukurareta Hōkama (造られた放火魔)	October 4, 2006	978-4-08-874266-3
62. "Fever" (熱【ねつ】, "Netsu"); 63. "Fire" (火【ひ】, "Hi"); 64. "Sudden" (急【きゅう】, "Kyū"); 65. "Criminal [Want]" (犯【やりたい】, "Yaritai"); 66. "Spring" (春【はる】, "Haru"); 67. "Criminal [Everything You Want]" (犯【やりたいほうだい】, "Yaritai Hōdai"); 68. "Name [Business Card]" (名【めいし】, "Meishi"); 69. "Hit" (殴【なぐる】, "Naguru"); 70. "Image" (画【え】, "E")
An electronic drug causes people to commit crimes.
9	"Electric Man" HAL "Denjin" Haru ("電人"HAL)	December 4, 2006	978-4-08-874291-5
071. "Dive"; 072. "Plan"; 073. "Gun"; 074. "Stab"; 075. "Return 1"; 076. "Return 2"; 077. "Him"; 078. "Run"; 079. "Chase"
HAL attempts to stop Neuro's plans to make HAL's mystery a nice meal.
10	Between 1 and 0; 1 to 0 no Hazama (1と0の狭間)	March 2, 2007	978-4-08-874329-5
080. "Itch"; 081. "Half [Fifty Percent]"; 082. "Key"; 083. "Demands"; 084. "Lone [Yako]"; 085. "Light"; 086. "Expenses"; 087. "Three People"; 088. "Two People"
Superhacker Yuya Higuchi falls under HAL's command.
11	Playing and Forgetting; Bōkyaku to Saisei (忘却と再生)	May 2, 2007	978-4-08-874356-1
089. "One Person"; 090. "Zero"; 091. "Forget"; 092. "Desk"; 093. "Horse"; 094. "Desk [Woman]"; 095. "Psychology"; 096. "New"; 097. "Evil"
The effects of the electronic drug are diminished thanks to Yako's wit.
12	Movement for the Elderly; Hatte Ugoku Rōjin (這って動く老人)	August 3, 2007	978-4-08-874404-9
098. "Earn"; 099. "Run"; 100. "Young"; 101. "Old [Child]"; 102. "Words"; 103. "Under [Evidence]"; 104. "Color [Six color, seven color]"; 105. "Inherit"; 106. "True"
13	Thief's Merit; Kaitō no Shinka (怪盗の真価)	October 4, 2007	978-4-08-874426-1
107. "Transmission"; 108. "Village"; 109. "Encounter"; 110. "i [Ai]"; 111. "Read"; 112. "Yoru"; 113. "Leech"; 114. "Kidnap"; 115. "Charge"
14	"Absolute Evil" "Zettai Aku" (「絶対悪」)	December 4, 2007	978-4-08-874447-6
116. "Change"; 117. "Value"; 118. "Gate"; 119. "X [Failure]"; 120. "Foul"; 121. "Evil"; 122. "Call"; 123. "Tea"; 124. "Disease"
15	Next Dark Intermission; Yami no Tonari no Intāmisshon (闇の隣のインターミッション)	February 4, 2008	978-4-08-874478-0
125. "Mother [Haruka]"; 126. "Men and Women"; 127. "Criminals"; 128. "Police"; 129. "Bug"; 130. "Mania"; 131. "Dream"; 132. "Idiot"; 133. "Fish"
16	Natural Enemy of the Demon; Majin no Tenteki (魔人の天敵)	April 4, 2008	978-4-08-874499-5
134. "Rain"; 135. "Rain [Downpour]"; 136. "Water [Dragon]"; 137. "Ticks"; 138. "S [Sadist]"; 139. "Fold"; 140. "Father"; 141. "Protect"; 142. "Diplomacy"
17	Coalition; Kyōtō (共闘)	July 4, 2008	978-4-08-874527-5
143. "Chocolate"; 144. "Day [Event]"; 145. "Face [Icon]"; 146. "Stake"; 147. "Hammer"; 148. "Conquest"; 149. "Cast Aside"; 150. "Dig"; 151. "Cooperation"
18	Eradicate Boy; Nedayashi no Shōnen (根絶やしの少年)	October 3, 2008	978-4-08-874576-3
152. "Entrust"; 153. "Bubble"; 154. "Witness"; 155. "Edge [Assassin]"; 156. "Differ"; 157. "Past"; 158. "Curse"; 159. "Plants"; 160. "Lose"
19	Queen Is Witch; Joō-sama wa Majo (女王様は魔女)	December 4, 2008	978-4-08-874604-3
161. "Strong [Weak]"; 162. "Paper [Result]"; 163. "Discipline [Training]"; 164. "Evidence [Assignment]"; 165. "Q [Queen]"; 166. "E [Age]"; 167. "D [Difficult]"; 168. ". [Droplet]"; 169. "S [Proof of Sadism]"
20	Smile; Emi (笑み)	February 4, 2009	978-4-08-874631-9
170. "6 [True Character]"; 171. "Master [Real]"; 172. "Fishing"; 173. "Secret Talk"; 174. "Fishing [Modest]"; 175. "Pillar"; 176. "■ [Numbers]"; 177. "Weave"; 178. "Sudden Change"
21	...to have met Deaete… (出会えて…)	May 1, 2009	978-4-08-874665-4
179. "Trap"; 180. "± [Eleven]"; 181. "Lie [Evil]"; 182. "Happiness"; 183. "Abandonment [Giving Up]"; 184. "Ties [Connection]"; 185. "Meet [Leave Behind]"; 186. "Return"; 187. "Hand [Slap]"
22	The Showdown of Each; Sorezore no Kessen (それぞれの決戦)	July 3, 2009	978-4-08-874702-6
188. "Spur [Distance]"; 189. "Perfection"; 190. "XI [All-star]"; 191. "Metal+Flesh [Summit]"; 192. "Eye"; 193. "XI [Unknown]"; 194. "i [Fragment]"; 195. "Species"; 196. "Cry [Make Cry]"
23	"Mystery" "Nazo" (「謎」)	August 4, 2009	978-4-08-874730-9
197. "Thanks [Gratitude]"; 198. "6 [Sicks]"; 199. "Death"; 200. "Demon"; 201. "Human"; 202. "Mystery [Supernatural Detective Neuro's only and best food supply]"

== See also ==
- List of Neuro: Supernatural Detective episodes
