= List of Ultraman Z episodes =

This is the episode list of Ultraman Z (ウルトラマンZ(ゼット), Urutoraman Zetto), the 2020 installment of the long running Ultra Series.

At the end of each episode, a minisode called Haruki's Ultra-Navi (ハルキのウルトラナビ, Haruki no Urutora Nabi) aired and featuring Haruki Natsukawa described the Ultra or Monster Medals of said episode.

== Episodes ==
No.	Title	Written by	Original release date	English release date
1	"Chant My Name!"; Transliteration: "Goshōwa Kudasai Ware no Na o!" (Japanese: ご唱和ください 我の名を!)	Kōta Fukihara	June 20, 2020	April 8, 2023
While cleaning up the rubble from STORAGE's past battle against Gomess, Haruki in Sevenger was assigned to protect the sheltered civilians from a space monster Genegarg while crossing paths with the young Ultraman Z. Z bonded with Haruki when the young man lost his life and gained access to Alpha Edge, using his new power to destroy the space shark. After the battle, Z entrusted Haruki with the mission to recover the scattered Ultra Medals from Genegarg while a space parasite named Celebro possessed Shinya Kaburagi. This episode's segment for Haruki's Ultra-Navi features the Medals of Ultraman Zero and Genegarg.
2	"A Warrior's Principles"; Transliteration: "Senshi no Kokoroe" (Japanese: 戦士の心得)	Kōta Fukihara	June 27, 2020	April 9, 2023
In Sevenger, Haruki was defeated by Neronga's constant use of invisibility. When the STORAGE crews anticipated its attack on a power plant, Z rescued Yoko/Sevenger from Neronga, and managed to defeat it through Haruki's prior training with Hebikura. This episode's segment for Haruki's Ultra-Navi features the Medals of Ultraseven and Neronga.
3	"Live Coverage! The Monster Transport Operation"; Transliteration: "Nama Chūkei! Kaijū Yusō Dai Sakusen" (Japanese: 生中継!怪獣輸送大作戦)	Kōta Fukihara	July 4, 2020	April 15, 2023
After a disastrous attempt in fighting Guigass, STORAGE was ordered to transport an ancient monster Gomora to an uninhabited island after a construction company discover it in a mountain. Haruki piloted Sevenger to assist with the removal while Kuriyama negotiated with the executives from Global Allied Forces America. As Z, he regained the Ultraman Medal from Yoko, allowing him to become Ultraman Z Beta Smash, using this new form to destroy the monster. The meeting with Global Allied Forces America was successful enough for STORAGE to receive funding into their new unit. This episode's segment for Haruki's Ultra-Navi features the Medals of Ultraman and Gomora.
4	"The Second Robot Activation Plan"; Transliteration: "Nigō Robo Kidō Keikaku" (Japanese: 二号ロボ起動計画)	Satoshi Suzuki	July 11, 2020	April 16, 2023
SAA-2 Windom was completed but to Yuka's dismay, massive revamp in its internal structure caused the machine to extend its charging period for four days while STORAGE has trouble with handling Telesdon. Using a piece of Neronga's horn, Yuka circumvent its charging period, allowing Yoko to support Ultraman Z. The Celebro-possessed Kaburagi tested his Monster Medal by imbuing Teledon with Jirahs' powers, but this did not stop the Ultraman/robot pair from defeating it. This episode's segment for Haruki's Ultra-Navi features the Medals of Ultraman Taro and Jirahs.
5	"First Juggling"; Transliteration: "Fāsuto Jaguringu" (Japanese: ファースト・ジャグリング)	Takao Nakano	July 18, 2020	April 22, 2023
A freezing monster, Peguila arises and make its way to Tokyo to destroy the ancient tool used to seal it. Yoko attempted to dispatch with Windom, but was caught frozen. Further worsened by the fact that Hebikura/Juggler briefly steal the Z Riser, Haruki was forced to use Sevenger to rescue Yoko before he can transform into Z and utilized the Z Lance Arrow to destroy it. To test his Dark Z Riser, Juggler transformed into Zeppandon and was defeated by the same Ultra. This episode's segment for Haruki's Ultra-Navi features the Medals of Ultraman Leo and Maga-Orochi.
6	"The Man Returns!"; Transliteration: "Kaettekita Otoko!" (Japanese: 帰ってきた男!)	Sotaro Hayashi	July 25, 2020	April 23, 2023
While STORAGE were conducting a simulation battle, a revived Gillvalis appeared and was reduced to his core by Geed. STORAGE are assigned to capture it, leading to a reunion between Z and Geed. At the end of the battle, Haruki and Riku formally introduce themselves while Kaburagi set his sight on the latter. This episode's segment for Haruki's Ultra-Navi features the Medals of Ultraman Ginga and Ultraman Belial.
7	"His Majesty's Medal"; Transliteration: "Heika no Medaru" (Japanese: 陛下のメダル)	Sotaro Hayashi	August 1, 2020	April 29, 2023
Riku was kidnapped by the Valis Raiders to be extracted of his genes, which Celebro uses alongside a Devil Splinter to create Belial Medal. After being freed by Juggler, Riku joined Haruki as their Ultras faced against the Belial Fusion Monsters, with Zero aided the battle as well. After the fight, Geed and Zero left Earth as they trusted Z's role as the planet's protector. This episode's segment for Haruki's Ultra-Navi features the Medals of Ultraman Orb and Ultraman X.
8	"The Mystic Power"; Transliteration: "Shinpi no Chikara" (Japanese: 神秘の力)	Yūji Kobayashi	August 8, 2020	April 30, 2023
Using samples gathered by Alien Pitt sisters that he brainwashed, Celebro becomes Tri King to demonstrate its power and had Yuka and Yoko captured after mistaking them for Z. When Tri King further upgrades into Five King, Hebikura supplies Z with the Medals to assume Gamma Future and turn the tides of the battle. This episode's segment for Haruki's Ultra-Navi features the Medals of Ultraman Tiga and Gan-Q.
9	"The Unidentified Object Convoy Order"; Transliteration: "Mikakunin Busshitsu Gosō Shirei" (Japanese: 未確認物質護送指令)	Satoshi Suzuki	August 15, 2020	May 6, 2023
After three Ultra Medals were stolen by Alien Barossa, STORAGE members are assigned to escort the other three in their possession to JAERC under the GAF's orders. Haruki, Hebikura and Yuka served as the bait for Barossa's King Joe while Yoko delivers the actual Medals, but Celebro ruined their plan into a three way battle. Z reclaims the Medals, using Gamma Future's ability trick King Joe into splitting while harnessing Lightning Generade to disable said robot. As GAFJ begins salvaging the King Joe, Alien Barossa made it out unharmed. This episode's segment for Haruki's Ultra-Navi features the Medals of Ultraman Dyna and Ultraman Mebius.
10	"Here Comes the Space Pirate!"; Transliteration: "Uchū Kaizoku Tōjō!" (Japanese: 宇宙海賊登場!)	Takao Nakano	August 22, 2020	May 7, 2023
Barely surviving King Joe's destruction, Alien Barossa made it out and broke into STORAGE's headquarters to reclaim King Joe. After being attacked by Juggler and the rest of the STORAGE members, Barossa exited the base and grew large to fight Z. Yoko handed Z the Ultra Medals that Barossa had stole previously, which he uses to kill the alien pirate. This episode's segment for Haruki's Ultra-Navi features the Medals of Ultraman Jack and Ultraman Cosmos.
SP	"Special Airborne Armor Secret File"; Transliteration: "Tokkūki Shīkuretto Fairu" (Japanese: 特空機シークレットファイル)	Ryo Ikeda	August 29, 2020	N/A
A recap episode focuses on the SAA units and their associations with past Ultra Warriors.
11	"What Must Be Defended"; Transliteration: "Mamoru beki Mono" (Japanese: 守るべきもの)	Kōta Fukihara	September 5, 2020	May 13, 2023
Haruki returns to his hometown for the anniversary of his father's death. While defending his town from a pair of Red Kings, Haruki was too late to realize of the monsters' purpose of awakening to protect their unhatched child when Z killed the father, forcing him to spare the mother from STORAGE's new SAA Unit, King Joe STORAGE Custom. This episode's segment for Haruki's Ultra-Navi features the Medals of Zoffy and Father of Ultra.
12	"The Cry of Life"; Transliteration: "Sakebu Inochi" (Japanese: 叫ぶ命)	Toshizo Nemoto	September 12, 2020	May 14, 2023
Because of the trauma from killing Red King, this affected Haruki greatly even when fighting as Ultraman Z in against Grigio Raiden. With King Joe STORAGE Custom fixed, Yoko went on piloting it in a coordinated attack against the monster, going as far as to kill it despite Haruki and Hebikura's orders. This episode's segment for Haruki's Ultra-Navi features the Medals of Ultraman Nexus and Ultraman Gaia.
13	"I'll Feast on Medals!"; Transliteration: "Medaru Itadakimasu!" (Japanese: メダルいただきます!)	Ryo Ikeda	September 19, 2020	May 20, 2023
Finding itself into STORAGE's base, Kanegon ate all of Haruki's Ultra Medals out of hunger. While trying to retrieve them, Haruki reviews all of Z's use with said Medals. Once he retrieved them, Haruki reconcile with Z after the events from Red King and Grigio Raiden caused him to hesitate.
14	"Four-Dimensional Capriccio"; Transliteration: "Yojigen Kyōsōkyoku" (Japanese: 四次元狂騒曲)	Kōta Fukihara	September 26, 2020	May 21, 2023
Using Bullton, Celebro creates a massive chaos inside the STORAGE base. At this point, Haruki was sent to the past when his father was still alive and receiving advice over the decision to protect others even if it means hurting someone else. As he return to present, Haruki regains his composure to fight properly as Ultraman Z. This episode's segment for Haruki's Ultra-Navi features the Medals of Ultraman Tiga and Jugglus Juggler.
15	"A Warrior's Duty"; Transliteration: "Senshi no Shimei" (Japanese: 戦士の使命)	Kōta Fukihara	October 3, 2020	May 27, 2023
As a result of Bullton's destruction, it created an imbalance which summoned Greeza onto Earth. Riku was alarmed by this event and joined Haruki/Z and Juggler/Five King, only to be absorbed in a futile attempt to catch the space needle. In order to save Riku/Geed, Haruki and Juggler obtain the Belial Medal from Celebro to use its power alongside Zero and Geed, forming Z Delta Rise Claw. After saving Geed, Z obtained the Space Needle Beliarok and destroy Greeza. Geed gave Haruki his Ultra Medals as his Geed Riser was fixed, continuing his mission in tracking the Devil Splinters in outer space. This episode's segment for Haruki's Ultra-Navi features the Medals of Ultraman Geed and Greeza.
16	"The Lion's Cry"; Transliteration: "Shishi no Koe" (Japanese: 獅子の声)	Yūji Kobayashi	October 10, 2020	May 28, 2023
Haruki accompanied Yuka to her hometown in Shishigaoka to prevent Horoboros' awakening. Although she succeeded in pacifying the monster, Celebro turned Horoboros into a rampaging Metsuboros and forced Z to put it out of its misery. This episode's segment for Haruki's Ultra-Navi features the Medals of Ultraman Zero Beyond and Gillvalis.
17	"Beliarok"; Transliteration: "Beriaroku" (Japanese: ベリアロク)	Takao Nakano	October 17, 2020	June 3, 2023
Continuing from the previous episode, Alien Barossa II set his sight on the Beliarok and further created a three way battle with Haruki and Juggler over the sentient sword. As he lost the weapon's ownership, Barossa II decided to avenge his brother by fighting Z and was killed when the Beliarok returned to Haruki on his own accord. Elsewhere, Celebro possessed the GAFJ captain Asano when Kaburagi's body became too injured to be used, pinning his former host as the scapegoat to his past atrocities. This episode's segment for Haruki's Ultra-Navi features the Medal of Ultraman Belial Atrocious.
18	"Rechallenge from the Year 2020"; Transliteration: "Nisen-nijū-nen no Sai Chōsen" (Japanese: 2020年の再挑戦)	Jun Tsugita	October 24, 2020	June 4, 2023
Haruki met a strange woman named Kaori in the middle of investigating disappearance cases in Kirimoto City. As he found out, Kaori was one of the many victims of Kemur during the aliens' first kidnapping schemes on Earth back in 1966, while she was forcefully used to become a living cover when the alien restarted their attempt in 2020. Using the Beliarok, Z split Kaori from Kemur and disposed of the alien's bomb into a pocket dimension. This episode's segment for Haruki's Ultra-Navi features the Medal of King Joe STORAGE Custom.
19	"The Last Hero"; Transliteration: "Saigo no Yūsha" (Japanese: 最後の勇者)	Toshizo Nemoto	October 31, 2020	June 10, 2023
Terrible-Monster Baraba was reborn from Yapool's grudges against Ace, fighting Z using its wide array of abilities. Ace appeared to assist Z in fighting the remnant of his old foe and combine their attack to form Space Z. This episode's segment for Haruki's Ultra-Navi features the Medal of Ultraman Ace.
SP	"Bonds of Masters and Disciples"; Transliteration: "Tsunagu Shitei" (Japanese: つなぐ師弟)	Ryo Ikeda	November 7, 2020	N/A
A recap episode focusing on Z's past battles and his predecessors' exploits.
20	"To Care and What Lies Beyond"; Transliteration: "Omoi, Sono Saki ni" (Japanese: 想い、その先に)	Yūji Kobayashi	November 14, 2020	June 11, 2023
In his day off, Kojiro Inaba visited his daughter Ruri, whose research on the artificial life form M1 grew into gigantic proportions due to a group of terrorists trying to kidnap it. Instead of killing it, STORAGE launched their operation to lure M1 away from the city while preparing the shrinking antidote. Through Z's help, he managed to held the creature off before Inaba shrank M1 back to its original size. This episode's segment for Haruki's Ultra-Navi features the Medal of Ultraman Belial.
21	"D4"	Satoshi Suzuki	November 21, 2020	June 17, 2023
A new weapon called D4 was created by implementing Yapool's extra-dimensional energy. In the midst of STORAGE's protest against using this superweapon, a horde of Kelbims sent by their mother set their sight on said energy source. King Joe was fitted with the D4 Ray and opened fire on the Kelbims, creating a massive energy backlash that tore reality apart before Z destroyed it. Due to STORAGE's protest against D4, Kuriyama had them disbanded. This episode's segment for Haruki's Ultra-Navi features the Medal of Ultraman Zero.
22	"Individual Tomorrows"; Transliteration: "Sorezore no Asu" (Japanese: それぞれの明日)	Sotaro Hayashi	November 28, 2020	June 18, 2023
3 days after STORAGE's disbandment, Haruki and Yoko spent their day off at Sevenger's exhibit where Yuka and Inaba worked at. Meanwhile, the SAAG developed Ultroid Zero to wield the D4 Ray technology while planning to extract the secret of Zestium Beam to stabilize it. Alien Barossa III appears to avenge his brothers' deaths and was joined by Juggler/Five King in fighting against Z. With the SAAG recruit fail to even properly piloting the King Joe STORAGE Custom, Yoko was forced to on board Sevenger and used Beliarok to kill Barossa. On the other hand, Five King managed to trick Z into firing his beam, allowing SAAG to extract Z's data while Juggler lost his medals to an unknown figure. Former STORAGE members walk to separate ways as Yoko becomes the Ultroid Zero's pilot. This episode's segment for Haruki's Ultra-Navi features the Medal of Windom.
23	"Prelude to a Nightmare"; Transliteration: "Akumu e no Pureryūdo" (Japanese: 悪夢へのプレリュード)	Kōta Fukihara	December 5, 2020	June 24, 2023
One month after the Kelbim and Barossa III's attacks, Ultroid Zero was put into test by Yoko at the same time when five monsters simultaneously made their move against the robot due to the presence of the D4 energy substance. Z interfered by having Takkong and King Guesra retrated, but the Ultroid Zero shorted out after firing the D4 Ray against Gomess, Pagos and Demaaga. While rescuing an unconscious Yoko, Hebikura revealed his true identity to Haruki/Z. This episode's segment for Haruki's Ultra-Navi features the Medal of Red King.
24	"The Game to Extinction"; Transliteration: "Metsubō e no Yūgi" (Japanese: 滅亡への遊戯)	Kōta Fukihara	December 12, 2020	June 25, 2023
After revealing himself to Haruki, Juggler prepares to claim the Ultroid for his own, but the two were forced to fight against Five King controlled by Celebro. Juggler was forced to save Haruki from Five King at the cost of losing Ultroid and Z losing the Belial Medal. After possessing Yoko, Celebro hijacked Ultroid Zero into absorbing monsters across the globe and eventually mutating it into Destrudos. His real intention is to eradicate mankind with their own invention in the same way as he did to various planets in the past. Z was defeated and Haruki was rescued by Juggler, who gathered former STORAGE members in a mutiny against the SAAG.
25	"Warriors Shining Beyond"; Transliteration: "Haruka ni Kagayaku Senshi-tachi" (Japanese: 遥かに輝く戦士たち)	Kōta Fukihara	December 19, 2020	July 1, 2023
After reclaiming the base from SAAG, STORAGE members put their operation to save Yoko into motion. Haruki/King Joe STORAGE Custom, Juggler/Windom and Inaba/Sevenger intercepted Destrudos where Haruki managed to punch his way into the cockpit as Yoko purged Celebro from his control and retrieved the Belial Medal for Haruki to transform into Z Delta Rise Claw. After being reduced to his original form, their resolve empowered Z's Zestium Beam to surpass the D4 Ray and finally destroying Destrudos. Celebro was captured by Yuka and Kaburagi to be dissected during his attempt to escape. Juggler and Haruki parted from STORAGE to space, the former to his own agendas while Haruki retain his bonds with Z to do rescue operations in outer space. This episode ended with a tribute to the late writer Kōta Fukihara, who died a month before the premier of the series.
SP	"Re:STORAGE"; Transliteration: "Ri Sutoreiji" (Japanese: リ:ストレイジ)	N/A	December 26, 2020	N/A
A special recap episode set after the final battle. It is an in-universe archived document narrated by STORAGE's artificial intelligence of the team's exploits since the start of their series, Z's fights on Earth and Celebro's schemes that eventually lead to the final battle itself.
