= List of The Elusive Samurai chapters =

The Elusive Samurai is a Japanese manga series written and illustrated by Yusei Matsui. It was serialized in Shueisha's shōnen manga magazine Weekly Shōnen Jump from January 25, 2021, to February 16, 2026. Shueisha has collected its chapters in 27 tankōbon volumes, released from July 2, 2021, to October 2, 2026.

In North America, the manga is licensed for English release by Viz Media, who simultaneously publishes the chapters digitally as they are released in Japan on its Shonen Jump website. In October 2021, Viz Media announced that they would publish its volumes in print, with the first one released on July 5, 2022. Shueisha also simulpublishes the series in English on the Manga Plus platform.

== Volumes ==
No.	Original release date	Original ISBN	English release date	English ISBN
1	July 2, 2021	978-4-08-882710-0	July 5, 2022	978-1-9747-3251-7
1. "The Slaughter of 1333" (滅亡1333, Metsubō 1333); 2. "Hide from the Demon 1333" (鬼ごっこ1333, Onigokko 1333); 3. "Revenge 1333" (仇討ち1333, Adauchi 1333); 4. "Suwa 1333" (諏訪1333, Suwa 1333); 5. "Hunting 1333" (狩猟1333, Shuryō 1333); 6. "Retainers 1333" (郎党1333, Rōtō 1333); 7. "Archery 1333" (弓術1333, Kyūjutsu 1333)
2	August 4, 2021	978-4-08-882734-6	September 6, 2022	978-1-9747-3397-2
8. "Dog-Shooting 1333" (犬追物1333, Inuōmono 1333); 9. "Ogasawara 1333" (小笠原1333); 10. "On the Run 1333" (逃げながら1333, Nigenagara 1333); 11. "Son of Wealth 1333" (坊っちゃん1333, Bocchan 1333); 12. "Sneaking In 1333" (潜入1333, Sen'nyū 1333); 13. "Infernal Ears 1333" (地獄耳1333, Jigokumimi 1333); 14. "Command 1333" (コマンド1333, Komando 1333); 15. "Takauji 1333" (尊氏1333); 16. "Worried 1334" (心配1334, Shinpai 1334)
3	November 4, 2021	978-4-08-882793-3	November 1, 2022	978-1-9747-3398-9
17. "Education 1334" (教育1334, Kyōiku 1334); 18. "Rogues 1334" (悪党1334, Akutō 1334); 19. "Defensive Battle 1334" (防衛戦1334, Bōei-sen 1334); 20. "Buddha 1334" (仏1334, Hotoke 1334); 21. "Bleeding 1334" (出血1334, Shukketsu 1334); 22. "Revered Buddha 1334" (御仏1334, Mihotoke 1334); 23. "Homage 1334" (臣従1334, Shinjū 1334); 24. "Mysteries 1334" (不可思議1334, Fukashigi 1334); 25. "Divine Power 1334" (神力1334, Shinriki 1334)
4	January 4, 2022	978-4-08-883010-0	January 3, 2023	978-1-9747-3438-2
26. "Kokushi 1334" (国司1334); 27. "Wanting to Die 1334" (死にたがり1334, Shinitagari 1334); 28. "Nasty Drunk 1334" (悪酔い1334, Waruyoi 1334); 29. "General 1334" (将1334, Shō 1334); 30. "Mounted Battle 1334" (騎馬戦1334, Kibasen 1334); 31. "Desire to Survive 1334" (生きたがり1334, Ikitagari 1334); 32. "Sashimi 1334" (刺身1334); 33. "Generation 1334" (ジェネレーション1334, Jenerēshon 1334); 34. "Etiquette 1334" (礼儀1334, Reigi 1334)
5	April 4, 2022	978-4-08-883073-5	March 7, 2023	978-1-9747-3629-4
35. "Question and Answer 1334" (問答1334, Mondō 1334); 36. "Warrior Woman 1334" (女傑1334, Joketsu 1334); 37. "Reform 1334" (改革1334, Kaikaku 1334); 38. "Tumult in Shinano 1335" (信濃動乱1335, Shinano Dōran 1335); 39. "Hawks 1335" (鷹1335, Taka 1335); 40. "Three Great Generals 1335" (三大将1335, San Taishō 1335); 41. "Mask 1335" (覆面1335, Fukumen 1335); 42. "Mikoshi 1335" (神輿1335); 43. "Military Strategy 1335" (軍略1335, Gunryaku 1335)
6	June 3, 2022	978-4-08-883184-8	May 2, 2023	978-1-9747-3696-6
44. "Bonds 1335" (繋がり1335, Tsunagari 1335); 45. "Funny Faces 1335" (顔芸1335, Kaogei 1335); 46. "Hair 1335" (髪1335, Kami 1335); 47. "Face 1335" (顔1335, Kao 1335); 48. "Kyo 1335" (京1335, Kyō 1335); 49. "Extraordinary 1335" (凄み1335, Sugomi 1335); 50. "Big City 1335" (大都会1335, Daitokai 1335); 51. "Sugoroku 1335" (双六1335); 52. "Basara 1335" (婆娑羅1335)
7	August 4, 2022	978-4-08-883198-5	July 4, 2023	978-1-9747-3871-7
53. "Wicked 1335" (腹黒1335, Haraguro 1335); 54. "Scanner 1335" (スキャナー1335, Sukyanā 1335); 55. "Kusunoki 1335" (楠木1335); 56. "Assassination 1335" (暗殺1335, Ansatsu 1335); 57. "Takauji 1335" (尊氏1335); 58. "Return 1335" (帰還1335, Kikan 1335); 59. "Options 1335" (選択1335, Sentaku 1335); 60. "Rogues 1335" (悪党1335, Akutō 1335); 61. "The Nakasendai War 1335" (中先代1335, Nakasendai 1335)
8	November 4, 2022	978-4-08-883291-3	September 5, 2023	978-1-9747-4092-5
62. "Armor 1335" (鎧1335, Yoroi 1335); 63. "Holy Pillar 1335" (御柱1335, Onbashira 1335); 64. "Back 1335" (背中1335, Senaka 1335); 65. "Main Fight 1335" (本戦1335, Honsen 1335); 66. "God 1335" (神1335, Kami 1335); 67. "Shadow 1335" (影1335, Kage 1335); 68. "War Machine 1335" (戦車1335, Sensha 1335); 69. "Exorcism 1335" (破魔1335, Hama 1335); 70. "Naming 1335" (名乗り1335, Nanori 1335)
9	January 4, 2023	978-4-08-883423-8	November 7, 2023	978-1-9747-4121-2
71. "Sadamune 1335" (貞宗1335); 72. "Leaving Shinano 1335" (出信濃1335, Shutsu Shinano 1335); 73. "Hisashiban 1335" (庇番1335); 74. "Shibukawa 1335" (渋川1335); 75. "Onakagehara 1335" (女影原1335); 76. "Mounted Single Combat 1335" (一騎討ち1335, Ikkiuchi 1335); 77. "The Side of Justice 1335" (正義1335, Seigi 1335); 78. "Weapons 1335" (武器1335, Buki 1335); 79. "Slapdash 1335" (雑1335, Zatsu 1335)
10	April 4, 2023	978-4-08-883438-2	February 6, 2024	978-1-9747-4380-3
80. "Ideals 1335" (理想1335, Risō 1335); 81. "Bushido 1335" (武士道1335, Bushidō 1335); 82. "Kojiro 1335" (弧次郎1335, Kojirō 1335); 83. "Recognition 1335" (認識1335, Ninshiki 1335); 84. "Kotesashigahara 1335" (小手指ヶ原1335); 85. "Kaisen 1335" (会戦1335); 86. "Mad Gallop 1335" (爆走1335, Bakusō 1335); 87. "Plan 1335" (策1335, Saku 1335); 88. "Derby 1335" (ダービー1335, Dābī 1335)
11	June 2, 2023	978-4-08-883561-7	May 7, 2024	978-1-9747-4598-2
89. "Menou 1335" (瑪瑙1335, Menō 1335); 90. "Trust 1335" (信頼1335, Shinrai 1335); 91. "Tadayoshi 1335" (直義1335); 92. "Scolding 1335" (おこられた1335, Okorareta 1335); 93. "Debate 1335" (ディベート1335, Dibēto 1335); 94. "Conversation 1335" (会話1335, Kaiwa 1335); 95. "Enjoyment 1335" (楽しさ1335, Tanoshisa 1335); 96. "Request 1335" (頼み1335, Tanomi 1335); 97. "Kamakura 1335" (鎌倉1335, Kamakura 1335)
12	September 4, 2023	978-4-08-883635-5	August 6, 2024	978-1-9747-4706-1
98. "Hojo Peace 1335" (北条の平和 1335, Hōjō no Heiwa 1335); 99. "Smithery 1335" (鍛冶1335, Kaji 1335); 100. "Differing Needs 1335" (百人百色 1335, Hyaku Nin Hyaku Iro 1335); 101. "Seii Taishogun 1335" (征夷大将軍 1335, Seiitaishōgun 1335); 102. "Family 1335" (家族 1335, Kazoku 1335); 103. "Typhoon 1335" (台風 1335, Taifū 1335); 104. "Miura 1335" (三浦 1335, Miura 1335); 105. "Ruler 1335" (天下人 1335, Tengabito 1335); 106. "Father and Child 1335" (父子1335, Fushi 1335)
13	November 2, 2023	978-4-08-883693-5	November 5, 2024	978-1-9747-4980-5
107. "Follower 1335" (郎党1335, Rōtō 1335); 108. "Elusive 1335" (逃げ上手1335, Nige Jōzu 1335); 109. "Successor 1335" (受け継ぐ1335, Uketsugu 1335); 110. "History 1335" (歴史 1335, Rekishi 1335); 111. "Intermission 1336, Part 1" (インターミッション 1336 1, Intāmisshon 1336 1); 112. "Intermission 1336, Part 2" (インターミッション 1336 2, Intāmisshon 1336 2); 113. "Intermission 1336, Part 3" (インターミッション 1336 3, Intāmisshon 1336 3); 114. "Intermission 1336, Final Part" (インターミッション1336（終）, Intāmisshon 1336 tsui); 115. "The Elusive Warriors 1337" (逃者党1337, Chōjatō 1337)
14	February 2, 2024	978-4-08-883823-6	February 4, 2025	978-1-9747-5257-7
116. "U.N.K. 1337" (U.N.K. 1337); 117. "Confirmation 1337" (見極め 1337, Mikiwame 1337); 118. "Student Confrontation 1337" (学生対決 1337, Gakusei Taiketsu 1337); 119. "Tone River 1337" (利根川 1337, Tonegawa 1337); 120. "Introductions 1337" (顔合わせ 1337, Kaoawase 1337); 121. "Youthful Days 1337" (少年時代 1337, Shōnen Jidai 1337); 122. "New Techniques 1337" (新技 1337, Shinwaza 1337); 123. "How a Noble Fights 1337" (公家の戦 1337, Kuge no Ikusa 1337); 124. "Brute Force 1337" (力攻め 1337, Chikarazeme 1337)
15	April 4, 2024	978-4-08-883883-0	May 6, 2025	978-1-9747-5463-2
125. "Reunion 1337" (再開 1337, Saikai 1337); 126. "Special Move 1337" (絶技 1337, Zetsugi 1337); 127. "The Future 1337" (未来 1337, Mirai 1337); 128. "Destiny 1337" (宿命 1337, Shukumei 1337); 129. "Shiba Ienaga 1337" (斯波家長 1337, Shiba Ienaga 1337); 130. "Kamakura 1337" (鎌倉 1337, Kamakura 1337); 131. "Masamune 1337" (正宗 1337, Masamune 1337); 132. "Sharing 1337" (山分け 1337, Yamawake 1337); 133. "Romance 1337" (恋愛 1337, Ren'ai 1337)
16	July 4, 2024	978-4-08-884111-3	August 5, 2025	978-1-9747-5555-4
134. "Departure and Leavetaking 1338" (征く人去る人 1338, Sei ku Hito Saru Hito 1338); 135. "Rations 1338" (兵糧 1338, Hyōrō 1338); 136. "Akiie 1333–1338" (顕家 1333〜1338, Akiie 1333〜1338); 137. "Drawing Lots 1338" (くじ 1338, Kuji 1338); 138. "Commander Credentials 1338" (大将検定 1338, Taishō Kentei 1338); 139. "Breakthrough 1338" (ブレイク 1338, Bureiku 1338); 140. "Full-Fledged 1338" (一人前 1338, Ichininmae 1338); 141. "Akiie's Army 1338" (顕家軍 1338, Akiie-gun 1338); 142. "Malfunction 1338" (バグ 1338, Bagu 1338)
17	September 4, 2024	978-4-08-884168-7	November 4, 2025	978-1-9747-5906-4
143. "Toki Yorito 1338" (土岐頼遠 1338, Toki Yoritō 1338); 144. "Governance 1338" (まつりごと 1338, Matsuri-goto 1338); 145. "Noble Warrior Combination: Aki-Ranger 1338" (公武合体アキレンジャー 1338, Kōbugatsutai Akirenjā 1338); 146. "Reunion 1338" (再開 1338, Saikai 1338); 147. "Kono Morofuyu 1338" (高師冬 1338, Kōno Morofuyu 1338); 148. "Respect 1338" (敬意 1338, Keii 1338); 149. "Brown Memory 1338" (茶色い記憶 1338, Chairoi Kioku 1338); 150. "Full Metal 1338" (フルメタル 1338, Furumetaru 1338); 151. "Hannyazaka 1338" (般若坂 1338, Hannyazaka 1338)
18	December 4, 2024	978-4-08-884285-1	January 6, 2026	978-1-9747-6100-5
152. "Shizuku 1338" (雫 1338, Shizuku 1338); 153. "Stewards 1338" (執事 1338, Shitsuji 1338); 154. "Distinguished 1338" (頭角 1338, Tōkaku 1338); 155. "Culture 1338" (文化 1338, Bunka 1338); 156. "Performance 1338" (上奏 1338, Jōsō 1338); 157. "Oshu 1338" (応酬 1338, Ōshū 1338); 158. "Offense and Defense 1338" (攻防 1338, Kōbō 1338); 159. "Pay No Mind 1338" (大丈夫 1338, Daijōbu 1338); 160. "Ambition 1338" (野心 1338, Yashin 1338)
19	February 4, 2025	978-4-08-884395-7	March 3, 2026	978-1-9747-6105-0
161. "Obdurate 1338" (頑強 1338, Gankyō 1338); 162. "False Report 1338" (虚報 1338, Kyohō 1338); 163. "Multitasking 1338" (マルチタスク 1338, Maruchitasuku 1338); 164. "Followers 1338" (従える者 1338, Shitagaeru Mono 1338); 165. "The Blue Devil Who Wept 1338" (泣いた青鬼 1338, Naita Aooni 1338); 166. "Strong Luck 1338" (強運 1338, Kyōun 1338); 167. "Rout 1338" (潰走 1338, Kaisō 1338); 168. "Nemesis 1338" (宿敵 1338, Shukuteki 1338); 169. "An Abundance of Flowers 1338" (百花繚乱 1338, Hyakkaryōran 1338)
20	May 2, 2025	978-4-08-884514-2	June 2, 2026	978-1-9747-6572-0
170. "Yoshino 1338" (吉野 1338, Yoshino 1338); 171. "Homesick 1338" (望郷 1338, Bōkyō 1338); 172. "? 1338"; 173. "Storm Bringer 1338" (ストームブリンガー 1338, Sutōmu Buringā 1338); 174. "Warring Gods 1338" (神の戦 1338, Kami no Sen 1338); 175. "Responsibility 1338" (責任 1338, Sekinin 1338); 176. "The End of The Divine Age 1338" (神代の終わり 1338, Jindai no Owari 1338); 177. "Choice 1338" (選択 1338, Sentaku 1338); 178. "The Road to Shinano 1338" (信濃へ。1338, Shinano e. 1338)
21	July 4, 2025	978-4-08-884569-2	August 4, 2026	978-1-9747-1648-7
179. "Shinano 1338–1340" (信濃 1338〜1340, Shinano 1338–1340); 180. "Siege 1340" (籠城 1340, Rōjō 1340); 181. "Support 1340" (応援 1340, Ōen 1340); 182. "Colorful 1340" (彩り 1340, Irodori 1340); 183. "Old 1340" (老い 1340, Oi 1340); 184. "Sake 1340" (酒 1340, Sake 1340); 185. "Sun Bin 1340" (孫臏 1340, Son Pin 1340); 186. "Ogasawara Sadamune 1340" (小笠原貞宗 1340, Ogasawara Sadamune 1340); 187. "Intermission 1339–1342" (インターミッション1339〜1342, Intāmisshon 1339〜1342)
22	October 3, 2025	978-4-08-884694-1	November 3, 2026	978-1-9747-6842-4
188. "Intermission 1343–1345" (インターミッション1343〜1345, Intāmisshon 1343〜1345); 189. "Intermission 1347–1348" (インターミッション1347〜1348, Intāmisshon 1347〜1348); 190. "Intermission 1349" (インターミッション1349, Intāmisshon 1349); 191. "Intermission 1350" (インターミッション1350, Intāmisshon 1350); 192. "Intermission (Kanto) 1338–1350" (インターミッション（関東）1338〜1350, Intāmisshon (Kantō) 1338〜1350); 193. "The End of Ambition 1351" (野心の行く末1351, Yashin no Yukusue 1351); 194. "Kono Morofuyu 1351" (高 師冬1351, Kōno Morofuyu 1351); 195. "Master and Pupil 1351" (師弟1351, Shitei 1351); 196. "Sacrifice 1351" (犠牲1351, Gisei 1351)
23	December 4, 2025	978-4-08-884818-1	January 5, 2027	978-1-9747-6946-9
197. "Going and Coming Back 1351" (征き、帰る1351, Yuki, Kaeru 1351); 198. "Counterattack 1351" (逆襲1351, Gyakushū 1351); 199. "Transformations 1351" (変貌1351, Henbō 1351); 200. "Yesterday's Enemy is Today's Friend 1351" (昨日の敵は今日の友1351, Kinō no Teki wa Kyō no Tomo 1351); 201. "Negotiation 1351" (交渉1351, Kōshō 1351); 202. "Ardent Warriors 1351" (血気の勇者1351, Kekkinoyū-sha 1351); 203. "Wild Melee 1351" (大乱戦1351, Dai Ransen 1351); 204. "Memories 1351" (おもいで1351, Omoide 1351); 205. "Purge 1351" (パージ1351, Pāji 1351)
24	March 4, 2026	978-4-08-884873-0	—	—
206. "Warning 1351" (忠告1351, Chūkoku 1351); 207. "Peak 1351" (ピーク1351, Pīku 1351); 208. "Command 1351" (コマンド1351, Komando 1351); 209. "Legend 1351" (伝説1351, Densetsu 1351); 210. "Dark War 1351" (暗闘1351, Antō 1351); 211. "Confession 1351" (告白1351, Kokuhaku 1351); 212. "Brotherly Spat 1351" (兄弟喧嘩1351, Kyōdai Kenka 1351); 213. "One In Body and Mind 1352" (一心同体1352, Isshin Dōtai 1352); 214. "Disturbance in Japan 1352" (日本動揺1352, Nihon Dōyō 1352)
25	May 1, 2026	978-4-08-885040-5	—	—
215. "The Battle of Musashino 1352" (武蔵野合戦1352, Musashino Gassen 1352); 216. "Preparing for the Big Battle 1352" (決戦準備1352, Kessen Junbi 1352); 217. "Kotesashigahara 1352" (小手指ヶ原1352, Kotesashigahara 1352); 218. "Only Good on Paper 1352" (紙上談兵1352, Shijō Danpei 1352); 219. "Tomoe 1352" (巴1352, Tomoe 1352); 220. "Evil God 1352" (悪神1352, Akujin 1352); 221. "Compensation 1352" (恩賞1352, Onshō 1352); 222. "The Trio 1352" (三人1352, San'nin 1352); 223. "Tag 1352" (鬼ごっこ1352, Onigokko 1352)
26	August 4, 2026	978-4-08-885139-6	—	—
224. "What I Have and You Don't 1352" (貴方に無くて私にあるもの1352, Anata ni Nakute Watashi ni aru Mono 1352); 225. "Extended Battle 1352" (延長戦1352, Enchō-sen 1352); 226. "Nanboku-Cho Invincibility 1352" (南北朝無双1352, Nanboku-chō Musō 1352); 227. "Parting Ways 1352" (別れ1352, Wakare 1352); 228. "Succession 1317" (継承1317, Keishō 1317); 229. "Children 1353" (子1353, Ko 1353); 230. "Sudden Developments 1353" (急転1353, Kyūten 1353); 231. "To War 1353" (出陣1353, Shutsujin 1353); 232. "Confrontation 1353" (対峙1353, Taiji 1353)
27	October 2, 2026	978-4-08-885205-8	—	—
233. "Life on the Line 1353" (命をかけて1353, Inochi o Kakete 1353); 234. "Tatsunokuchi 1353" (龍ノ口1353, Tatsunokuchi 1353); 235. "Unyielding 1353" (譲れないもの1353, Yuzurenai Mono 1353); 236. "Hojo Tokiyuki 1353" (北条時行1353, Hōjō Tokiyuki 1353); 237. "Epilogue, Part 1 of 2" (エピローグ1/2, Epirōgu 1/2); 238. "Epilogue, Part 2 of 2" (エピローグ2/2, Epirōgu 2/2)
