= Koro Sensei Quest =

Japanese manga and anime series

- Cover of the first volume of the manga

殺せんせーQ!
- Genre: Adventure; Comedy; Slice of life
- Manga
- Written by: Kizuku Watanabe
- Illustrated by: Jō Aoto
- Published by: Shueisha
- Magazine: Saikyō Jump
- Original run: October 2, 2015 – October 4, 2019
- Volumes: 5
- Anime film
- Directed by: Seiji Kishi; Yoshito Nishōji
- Written by: Makoto Uezu
- Music by: Naoki Satō
- Studio: Lerche
- Released: November 19, 2016
- Runtime: 120 minutes
- Original net animation
- Directed by: Yoshito Nishouji
- Produced by: Noriko Ozaki
- Written by: Yūsei Matsui; Makoto Uezu; Jou Aoto
- Music by: Naoki Satō
- Studio: Lerche
- Licensed by: NA: Crunchyroll (Note: Formerly known as Funimation.)
- Released: December 23, 2016 – March 9, 2017
- Episodes: 12

Koro Sensei Quest (殺せんせーQ!; also written as Koro Teacher Quest) is a manga written by Kizuku Watanabe and illustrated by Jo Aoto. The manga is a spin-off of Yūsei Matsui's Assassination Classroom that features the original cast of the original manga.

== Plot ==
In the alternate universe set in an RPG world, the students of Kunugigaoka Junior High School are heroes under training and students of Class 3-E are those with bugs, making them weaker than other heroes. They are tasked to defeat Koro-sensei, an octopus-like creature, who intentionally teaches them so they can assassinate him one day.

== Characters ==
Koro-sensei (殺せんせー, Koro-sensē)
Voiced by: Jun Fukuyama (Japanese); Sonny Strait (English)
Koro-sensei is a biological made monster who intentionally offered himself to be the teacher of Class 3-E so they could defeat him someday. He was once a hero who achieved everything and grew bored. Aguri Yukimura from Temple of Trade then offered him a position as a Demon King and the robe he wears gave him the yellow octopus-like appearance he has now. Even after becoming the Demon King, he was still bored since nobody could defeat him, hence the reason he wanted to teach Class 3-E.
Nagisa Shiota (潮田 渚, Shiota Nagisa)
Voiced by: Mai Fuchigami (Japanese); Lindsay Seidel (English)
Nagisa is one of the students in Class 3-E and the main student character. Unlike other students, Nagisa's bug is randomized, and ranges from making his body buffed to turning back the time without erasing anyone's memory. Due to his feminine face and figure, he is able to equip items meant for female characters.
Kaede Kayano (茅野 カエデ, Kayano Kaede)
Voiced by: Aya Suzaki (Japanese); Monica Rial (English)
Kaede is one of the students in Class 3-E who is often seen with Nagisa. She loves pudding and has a complex about her small chest (even treating it as her bug).
Karma Akabane (赤羽 業(カルマ), Akabane Karuma)
Voiced by: Nobuhiko Okamoto (Japanese); Austin Tindle (English)
Karma is one of the students in Class 3-E, but initially appeared as a genius Red Devil who lived in a northern cave. His bug is when he is looking down at someone, his luck drops drastically, which stays true to his name. One of his notable bad lucks is when washtubs from nowhere hitting his head countless times. He joins Class 3-E after Koro-sensei "defeats" him.
Yūma Isogai (磯貝 悠馬, Isogai Yūma)
Voiced by: Ryōta Ōsaka (Japanese); Jerry Jewell (English)
Isogai is one of the students in Class 3-E, and the class representative who is labeled as the class' "gentleman" (イケメン, ikemen). Out of the students, he has the most different armor that is most "hero-ish" but because his family is poor, he only could afford the front half of his armor, although this is revealed to be his bug.
Ryōma Terasaka (寺坂 竜馬, Terasaka Ryōma)
Voiced by: Subaru Kimura (Japanese); Marcus D. Stimac (English)
Terasaka is one of the students in Class 3-E, who has a big body and is the leader of 'rebel' clique in the class. In the anime, after a treasure box swaps his body, he is abandoned in the dungeon and trains until he eventually turns level 99 and becomes the strongest in the class. The fake version of him speaks English, and after the real Terasaka appeared, the fake one remains in Class 3-E.
Yuzuki Fuwa (不破 優月, Fuwa Yuzuki)
Voiced by: Kana Ueda (Japanese); Kristi Kang (English)
Fuwa is one of the students in Class 3-E, who is prone to breaking the fourth wall.
Kunudon (くぬどん)
Voiced by: Kurumi Mamiya
Kunudon is a species that serves as the most basic monster in the anime. It has a slime-like, orange-colored body with a slender pair of hands and wears shoes, and a kettle hat on their heads.

== Media ==
=== Manga ===
The series started its serialization in Japan in Shueisha's Saikyō Jump magazine on October 2, 2015. The first volume of the manga has been released on July 4, 2016. The manga finished on October 4, 2019.

No.	Release date	ISBN
1	July 4, 2016	978-4-08-880733-1
2	March 3, 2017	978-4-08-881094-2
3	January 4, 2018	978-4-08-881334-9
4	February 4, 2019	978-4-08-881737-8
5	November 1, 2019	978-4-08-882117-7

=== Film ===
The manga received an anime film adaptation which premiered in Japan on November 19, 2016. It was animated by Lerche, the same studio that animated the two seasons of the original anime.

=== Anime ===
An anime series sequel adaption of Koro Sensei Quest! was announced consisting of twelve 10-minute episodes. It is a re-cut of the film. The opening theme titled "RE:QUEST!" is sung by Aya Suzaki under her character name Kaede Kayano, while the ending theme features a 8-bit version of the main series' first opening theme "Seishun Satsubatsu-ron" (青春サツバツ論; "The Theory of Savage Youth"). Episode 10 features the main series' 4th ending, "Mata Kimi ni aeru Hi" (また君に会える日; "The Day I Can See You Again") sung by Kōtarō Takebayashi (Takahiro Mizushima). Crunchyroll streamed the series with Funimation providing the English Dub. Funimation began airing the English dub on January 12, 2017, with the original cast returning as their original characters.

==== Episode list ====
No.	Title (Note: Japanese titles are taken from each episodes' next episode preview and the English titles are taken from Crunchyroll.)	Original release date
1	"The E Class and the Big Bad"; Transliteration: "Maō to E-gumi" (Japanese: 魔王とE組)	December 23, 2016
Set in a role-playing game world, the students of Kunigigaoka Junior High School's Class 3-E are heroes-in-training filled with various bugs. Royal Knight Commander Tadaomi Karasuma tasks the students to kill Koro-sensei the Demon King, who in return will train them how to beat him as the "final boss". When Slime Kunudons attack the students, Nagisa Shiota bulks up his body and unleashes a small fireball to cause the Slime Kunudons to retreat.
2	"The Red Devil"; Transliteration: "Akai Akuma" (Japanese: 赤い悪魔)	December 30, 2016
Koro-sensei and the students of Class 3-E travel to the northern cave to confront Karma Akabane the Red Devil, who is known to be unlucky when he is cocky, especially when washtubs randomly land on his head. Inside the northern cave, they are soon surrounded by Mushroom Kunudons, but Karma makes an unexpected appearance. Even though Karma falls through a trap door, he comes back up and tries to catch Koro-sensei. However, Koro-sensei takes Karma to a hot springs in order to convince him to join the class.
3	"The Seductive Witch"; Transliteration: "Yūwaku no majo" (Japanese: 誘惑の魔女)	January 5, 2017
Koro-sensei and the students of Class 3-E go to a nearby village, where the village chief warns them of Irina Jelavić the Seductive Witch. They go to the Tower of Temptation, where Irina seduces Hiroto Maehara, Taiga Okajima and Koro-sensei with her beauty. As Karasuma holds them off, the other students follow Irina to the top floor. Nagisa and Karma, the only male students who remain unaffected by her spell, are thrown out of the tower, but are saved by Koro-sensei, who was faking enchantment the entire time.
4	"The Ruins of Tribulation"; Transliteration: "Shiren no iseki" (Japanese: 試練の遺跡)	January 12, 2017
Karasuma visits Pope Gakuhō Asano, who devises a plan to lure Koro-sensei into a trap. Koro-sensei and the students of Class 3-E go into the Ruins of Tribulation with three chambers hosted by a Guardian Kunudon. In the Chamber of Impostors, the students figure out that Ryōma Terasaka is the fake student. In the Chamber of Secrets, Nagisa fights back with a notebook containing all of Koro-sensei's weak points after Koro-sensei reveals his notebook containing top secret information about the students. In the Chamber of Self Sacrifice, Koro-sensei undoubtedly frees his students from being crushed, while being momentarily locked inside the ruins.
5	"The Evolved Mage"; Transliteration: "Shinka no majutsu-shi" (Japanese: 進化の魔術師)	January 19, 2017
The students have a new addition to their class, her being the Autonomous Intelligence Magic Stone Tablet, who can perform various forms of sorcery. She is also known as Ritsu the Evolved Mage. In a cave, the students are faced against Stone Kunudons. After Ritsu defeats the Stone Kunudons, she temporarily petrifies the other students to gain all the experience points. As she continues to hog the experience points throughout the cave, Koro-sensei has the other students prove themselves worthy against a level nineteen Stone Kunudon. The next day, the other students are surprised when Koro-sensei modifies Ritsu with a human personality.
6	"The Silver Berserker"; Transliteration: "Gin no kyōsenshi" (Japanese: 銀の狂戦士)	January 26, 2017
Itona Horibe the Silver Berserker crashes through the classroom, and his guardian Mage Shiro tells Koro-sensei that Itona will be the new Demon King. Itona attacks with tentacles of his own against Koro-sensei, while Shiro takes his leave. Tōka Yada and Hinano Kurahashi host a game show for Koro-sensei and Itona, asking them a series of questions to determine who deserves to be the Demon King. However, neither of them prove worthy enough. Itona yanks out his tentacles when he finds out that he needs a sense of humor. The next day, Itona joins the class.
7	"The Big Five Attack!"; Transliteration: "Go eiketsu!" (Japanese: 五英傑！)	February 2, 2017
Class 3-E talks about Class 3-A's Big Five (Gakushū Asano, Teppei Araki, Ren Sakakibara, Natsuhiko Koyama and Tomoya Seo), an elite group of paladins. Irina joins the class as the magic teacher just to get the latest gossip. The students of Class 3-E disguises Koro-sensei as a scholar before Gakushū, who rides on horseback, and the rest of the Big Five show up at the classroom. After Gakushū fails to attack Koro-sensei with a Light Orb, Koro-sensei realizes that the Big Five was not sent by Gakuhō in the first place. This causes the Big Five to retreat.
8	"Big Bad Switcheroo"; Transliteration: "Ore ga maō de maō ga ore de" (Japanese: オレが魔王で魔王がオレで)	February 9, 2017
Class 3-E finds a treasure chest deep in a cave, but it turned out to be empty when it is opened. To make matters worse, everyone switches bodies with someone else. With everyone trying to adapt to each other's new bodies, some are faced against Caterpillar Kunudons. Nagisa finds Karma, who have switch bodies, in a hidden part of the cave. It has another treasure chest which contains a Swap Orb, reverting everyone back to normal. However, a Caterpillar Kunudon has switched bodies with Koro-sensei.
9	"Showdown at Fukuma Tower"; Transliteration: "Kessen! Fukuma no tō" (Japanese: 決戦！伏魔の塔)	February 16, 2017
Kaede Kayano witnesses Nagisa and her pudding being abducted by Akira Takaoka the Merciless, ringleader of the Taka Gang. The students of Class 3-E goes to Fukuma Tower, where Nagisa is being held captive. On the second floor, Yuzuki Fuwa takes down Smog the Noxious by breaking the fourth wall. On the third floor, Karma kicks Grip the Crusher out of the tower. On the fourth floor, Ryūnosuke Chiba and Rinka Hayami snipe Gastro the Fiend between the legs. On the top floor, the students find Nagisa dressed up in feminine clothing. Takaoka poisons the pudding, which causes Kaede to slumber when she eats it, and Nagisa is forced to be the "princess" and kiss her. However, she turns into a green octopus.
10	"Takebayashi, Leaving the E Class?"; Transliteration: "Takebayashi, E-gumi Yameru tte yo" (Japanese: 竹林、E組まめるってよ)	February 23, 2017
The female students go to Irina to brew a potion for sacks of chocolates. On Valentine's Day, some of the female students give some of the male students the sacks of chocolates, but it turns the male students into monsters for a day. The day after that, Kōtarō Takebayashi decides to leave Class 3-E to join Class 3-A instead, saying that he wants to spread his wings and fly, but that is because he received no chocolates from the female students the day before. The students tie him up to a chair and all the female students dress up in maid uniforms, but to no effect. It is not until Ritsu uses her alluring sorcery that Takebayashi is convinced to stay in Class 3-E.
11	"It's Not a Job, It's a Calling"; Transliteration: "Tenshoku? Tenshoku?!" (Japanese: 転職？天職？！)	March 2, 2017
When Koro-sensei was a human, he was thought of as a hero, but became bored of his work. He was assigned by Aguri Yukimura to be a Demon King and live in a castle, since his predecessor (actually Neuro from Neuro: Supernatural Detective) retired from his position. Koro-sensei shortly became an octopus after wearing the Demon King's wardrobe. Koro-sensei's pupil, who came to vanish the Demon King, was assigned by Aguri to be The Reaper. However, Koro-sensei was still bored with his new position, with no one worthy enough to challenge him. That led him to become a teacher in order to train students to be warriors strong enough to defeat him.
12	"Bye Bye, Big Bad"; Transliteration: "Bye Bye Maō" (Japanese: BYE BYE 魔王)	March 9, 2017
The students of Class 3-E storm through the castle to get to the Demon King. Many students sacrifice themselves for each other in many traps as they travel to the throne room. With only Nagisa, Kaede, Karma, Itona and Takebayashi left, they find out that Koro-sensei was fired from his job by Gakuhō. The real Terasaka saves the other students, as he is revealed to have survived this whole time and increased his strength to level ninety-nine. The castle begins to crumble, and Koro-sensei asks Nagisa to use his power to save everyone. Nagisa turns back time to when Koro-sensei was first introduced to the students, but keeping everyone's memory intact as New Game Plus.
