= Assassination Classroom: Grand Siege on Koro-sensei =

2015 action video game

- Developer: Bandai Namco Games
- Publisher: Bandai Namco Games
- Series: Assassination Classroom
- Platform: Nintendo 3DS
- Release: JP: March 12, 2015
- Genre: Action
- Modes: Single-player, multiplayer

Assassination Classroom: Grand Siege on Koro-sensei (Note: Ansatsu Kyōshitsu: Koro-sensei Dai Hōimō (Japanese: 暗殺教室 殺せんせー大包囲網!!)) is a 2015 action video game developed and published by Bandai Namco Games for the Nintendo 3DS. It is based on the science fiction comedy manga series Assassination Classroom by Yusei Matsui. The game follows a class of middle school students and their homeroom teacher Koro-sensei, an octopus-like superbeing who the students have been tasked with killing.

Grand Siege on Koro-sensei was released on March 12, 2015, and sold over 25,000 copies in the following few days. The game received a more mixed critical response, with the game being criticized for its gameplay, with praise being directed towards the game's style and humor.

== Gameplay ==
A screenshot of gameplay, showing the player attacking Koro-sensei using a rapid-fire gun, with assistance from another student

Assassination Classroom: Grand Siege on Koro-sensei is an action game where players control a middle school student of the Kunugigaoka Junior High School. The game is divided into several different missions, featuring different requirements for the missions to be cleared, although they primarily revolve around defeating the student's homeroom teacher, Koro-sensei, within a given time limit. Defeating Koro-sensei is done via the use of different types of firearms and by setting traps, and placing traps in sequence will produce combos, dealing greater damage. If a trap is triggered at close range, the player will enter "fever time", allowing Koro-sensei to be rapidly shot.

Certain missions see the player as Koro-sensei, who has to avoid being defeated by the students through the use of different attacks and moves.

== Development and release ==
Assassination Classroom: Grand Siege on Koro-sensei was developed and published by Bandai Namco Games. Bandai Namco first became familiar with Assassination Classroom through the development of the fighting game J-Stars Victory VS, which features Koro-sensei as a playable character. The game is an adaptation of the Assassination Classroom manga series created by Yusei Matsui.

The game was first announced in October 2014 via an issue of Weekly Shōnen Jump, which Assassination Classroom was then being serialized in. Further gameplay and release details were unveiled by Bandai Namco through promotional videos and screenshots in the following months. The game was released on March 12, 2015, for the Nintendo 3DS, exclusively in Japan.

== Reception and sales ==
Reception

Review score
Publication	Score
Famitsu	25/40 (6, 5, 7, 7)

Grand Siege on Koro-sensei received a neutral reception from critics. Famitsu, the most popular video game magazine in Japan, rated the game 25/40 and calculated a normalized rating of 6.3/10, based on 4 of their critics' reviews.

The gameplay of missions received a mixed critical response. Namuko Kushida of Famitsu described the game as easy to play, whereas Tsutsumi, also of Famitsu, opined that he experienced it as difficult to tell which characters have certain abilities, making gameplay feel imprecise. Fellow Famitsu writer Jigoro Ashida enjoyed the game's amount of content, but also wrote that the game started to feel "repetitive" after a while.

The game's general style was met with more favorable reception than the gameplay: Tsutsumi voiced a liking to how the game's traps are reminiscent of the Assassination Classroom manga and anime, describing it as "adorable", and Kushida complimented the game's black comedy style and character animation.

Grand Siege on Koro-sensei sold over 25,000 copies in its first three days of release; by June 2015, the game had sold over 83,000 copies.

== Sequel ==
On December 14, 2015, Bandai Namco announced a sequel to Grand Siege on Koro-sensei, titled Assassination Classroom: Assassin Training Plan. The sequel was released on March 24, 2016, for the Nintendo 3DS, exclusively in Japan. The game features similar gameplay to the first game with some added features, such as being able to train the game's characters to change their statistics.
