= The Incite Mill =

2010 Japanese film by Hideo Nakata

- Theatrical release poster
- Directed by: Hideo Nakata
- Written by: Satoshi Suzuki
- Based on: The Incite Mill by Honobu Yonezawa
- Produced by: Taka Ichise
- Starring: Tatsuya Fujiwara; Haruka Ayase; Satomi Ishihara; Aya Hirayama; Nagisa Katahira; Kin'ya Kitaōji
- Cinematography: Junichiro Hayashi
- Edited by: Nobuyuki Takahashi
- Music by: Kenji Kawai
- Production companies: Horipro; NTV; Twins Japan; Warner Bros. Japan; YTV
- Distributed by: Warner Bros. Pictures
- Release date: 16 October 2010 (Japan)
- Country: Japan
- Language: Japanese

The Incite Mill (インシテミル ７日間のデス・ゲーム, Inshite Miru: 7-kakan no desu gemu; The Incite Mill: 7-Day Death Game) is a 2010 Japanese psychological thriller directed by Hideo Nakata. The movie is based on Honobu Yonezawa's novel of the same name.

== Plot ==
Ten people are promised a dream job that pays 112,000 yen ($1,236 US dollars) per hour, no experience or qualifications necessary. They are then taken to a remote underground complex where they are locked up and forced to participate in a murderous game that will last for seven days.

== Cast ==
- Tatsuya Fujiwara as Rikuhiko Yuki
- Haruka Ayase as Shoko Suwana
- Satomi Ishihara as Miya Sekimizu
- Aya Hirayama as Wakana Tachibana
- Shinji Takeda as Sousuke Iwai
- Tsuyoshi Abe as Yudai Osako
- Kin'ya Kitaōji as Yoshi Ando
- Nagisa Katahira as Sawako Fuchi
- Takurō Ōno as Yukito Maki
- Masanori Ishii as Munehiro Nishino
- Yuki Furukawa as Indian Doll (voice)
- Daisuke Kikuta

== Theme music ==
- Song title: "Shinjitemiru" (シンジテミル), translates to "See the Truth"
- Label: Victor Entertainment (VTCL-35101)
- Release date: October 13, 2010
- This is Nakabayashi Mei's 3rd single release under her stage name of May'n.

== Production ==
On 18 January 2010 Horipro confirmed Hideo Nakata as director of the film adaptation of the 2007 mystery novel Inshite Miru (The Incite Mill) by Honobu Yonezawa. Shooting began in March 2010. Tatsuya Fujiwara, Haruka Ayase and Satomi Ishihara were cast in the leading roles. Satoshi Suzuki wrote the screenplay.

== Release ==
The film was released in Japanese theaters on 16 October 2010.
