= Masanori Ishii =

Japanese actor, comedian and narrator (born 1973)

- 石井正則
- Born: March 21, 1973 (age 53); Hodogaya Ward, Yokohama, Kanagawa Prefecture, Japan
- Occupations: actor comedian narrator
- Known for

Masanori Ishii (石井 正則, Ishii Masanori; born March 21, 1973 in Yokohama) is a Japanese actor, comedian and narrator. In August 1994, he teamed up with Yoshiyuki Ishizuka to form the comedy duo "Ari to kirigirisu" or "Ant to the Grasshopper" . He has had roles in such works as The Incite Mill (2010), Suite Dreams (2006), Journey to the West (2006).

== Filmography ==
=== Film ===
Year	Title	Role	Notes
2003	Graduation	Amemiya Hiroshi (Barman)	
2004	Promise Land: Kurôbâzu no Daibôken	Kômori-kun	
2005	Negotiator: Mashita Masayoshi	Yano	
2006	Suite Dreams	Kurôdo	
2006	UDON		
2007	The Graduates	Shinpei Kaneko	
2007	When I was a Lemon	Kaneko Shinpei	
2008	Shaolin Girl	Electronics Store Owner	
2008	Nagai nagai satsujin	Nobuo Takai	
2010	The Incite Mill	Munehiro Nishino	
2010	Railways	Takubo Toshikazu, the railway controller	
2010	Hybrid Battle	Hanzawa Shunsuke	
2011	Compass of Girls	Taira Hiroaki	
2013	The Storyteller's Apprentice		
2013	The After-Dinner Mysteries		
2014	Magic Night		
2015	Maestro!		
2020	Fukushima 50	Yasuaki Kudō	
2021	What Happened to Our Nest Egg!?		

=== Television ===
Year	Title	Role
2000	Audrey (オードリー)	Toru sekikawa
2001	Jikū keisatsu Part 1	
2001	Beach Wars Mix	Tsurumaki Jun
2002	Shinri bunseki sōsakan Sakiyama Tomoko	
2002	Jikū keisatsu Part 2	
2002	Here's Looking at You	Takano Kyoji
2003	Okashina keiji 1	
2003	Jikū keisatsu Part 3	
2004	Keishichō shinri bunseki sōsakan Sakiyama Tomoko 2: Ame ni yugamu onna no satsui	
2005	Jikū keisatsu Part 4	
2005	Jikū keisatsu Part 5	
2005	Tōbōsha: Kijima Jōichirō	
2006	Journey to the West	
2006	Kodakusan keiji	
2006	Hayashiya Sanpei monogatari	
2006	Furuhata Ninzaburo Final	Mamoru Saionji
2006-2007	Kekkaishi	Hakubi (voice)
2007	Bibō no Mesu Nōshinkeigekai Tsuyama Keiko	
2007	Seito shokun!	Orito Satoshi
2007	Zou no Hanako	
2008	Nodame kantābire in Yōroppa	Katahira Hajime
2008	Nihonshi sasupensu gekijō	Reporter
2009	Sumairu	Yamane
2010	Himitsu no kankei: Sensei wa doukyonin	
2010	Reinōryokusha Odagiri Kyōko no uso	
2011	Okashina Keiji 8	Akenokoji
2012	Stepfather Steps	Koichi tajima
2012	Hanchō: Jinnansho Azumihan	Izumida
2012	Taburakashi ~Daikō Joyūgyō Maki~	Fuwa
2012	Okashina Keiji 9	
2012	Priceless	Sagamigawa
2013	Okashina Keiji 10	Akenokoji
2013	Mottomo tōi ginga	Jiro Horimine
2013	Star Man: kono hoshi no koi	
2013	Danda Rin - The Labour Standards Inspector	
2013	Keiji Yoshinaga Seiichi Namida no Jikenbo	Yutaka jimbo
2013-2014	Naru yō ni Naru sa	
2014	Gokuaku Gambo	
2014	Sherlock Holmes (puppetry)	Wilson Kemp (voice)
2015	Hana Moyu	Inoue Kaoru
2016	Mikaiketsu Jiken: File. 05	Tsutomu Hotta
