= Assassination Classroom =

Japanese manga series by Yusei Matsui

- First tankōbon volume cover, featuring Koro-sensei's face

暗殺教室 (Ansatsu Kyōshitsu)
- Genre: Action; Science fiction comedy
- Manga
- Written by: Yusei Matsui
- Published by: Shueisha
- English publisher: NA: Viz Media
- Imprint: Jump Comics
- Magazine: Weekly Shōnen Jump
- Original run: July 2, 2012 – March 25, 2016
- Volumes: 21
- Original animation DVD
- Directed by: Keiji Gotoh
- Music by: Tomoki Kikuya
- Studio: Brain's Base
- Released: December 27, 2013
- Runtime: 23 minutes
- Anime television series
- Directed by: Seiji Kishi
- Produced by: Noriko Ozaki
- Written by: Makoto Uezu
- Music by: Naoki Satō
- Studio: Lerche
- Licensed by: Crunchyroll (Note: In North America through Crunchyroll, LLC (formerly known as Funimation), in the United Kingdom through Crunchyroll UK and Ireland (formerly known as Manga Entertainment), and in Australia through Crunchyroll Pty. Ltd (formerly known as Madman Anime.); UK: Anime Limited (former); SA/SEA: Muse Communication
- Original network: Fuji TV, KTV, BS Fuji
- English network: IN: Animax; SEA: Animax, Gem; US: Adult Swim (Toonami)
- Original run: January 9, 2015 – June 30, 2016
- Episodes: 47 + 1 OVA
- Anime film

Assassination Classroom the Movie: 365 Days
- Directed by: Seiji Kishi
- Written by: Makoto Uezu
- Music by: Naoki Satō
- Studio: Lerche
- Licensed by: Crunchyroll (Note: Formerly known as Funimation.)
- Released: November 19, 2016
- Runtime: 92 minutes
- Live-action films
- Assassination Classroom (2015); Assassination Classroom: Graduation (2016)
- Video games
- Assassination Classroom: Enclosure Time (2015); Assassination Classroom: Grand Siege on Koro-sensei (2015); Assassination Classroom: Assassin Training Plan (2016)
- Spin-off
- Koro Sensei Quest
- icon

Assassination Classroom (Japanese: 暗殺教室, Hepburn: Ansatsu Kyōshitsu) is a Japanese manga series written and illustrated by Yusei Matsui. The series follows the daily life of an extremely powerful octopus-like being working as a junior high homeroom teacher, and his students dedicated to the task of assassinating him to prevent Earth from being destroyed. The students are considered "misfits" in their school and are taught in a separate building; the class he teaches is called 3-E. It was serialized in Shueisha's shōnen manga magazine Weekly Shōnen Jump from July 2012 to March 2016, with its chapters collected in twenty-one tankōbon volumes.

In North America, the manga has been licensed for English language release by Viz Media. The anime series has been licensed by Crunchyroll, formerly known as Funimation. The series was obtained by Madman Entertainment for digital distribution in Australia and New Zealand. An original video animation (OVA) adaptation produced by Brain's Base was screened at the Jump Super Anime Tour from October to November 2013. This was followed by an anime television adaptation by Lerche, which aired on Fuji Television, BS Fuji and other stations from January 2015 to June 2016. A live action film adaptation was released in March 2015, and a sequel, titled Assassination Classroom: Graduation, was released in March 2016.

By October 2023, the Assassination Classroom manga had over 27 million copies in circulation. Both the anime and manga have been received positively.

== Plot ==
Earth is left in disarray when 70% of the Moon is obliterated, leaving it in the shape of a crescent. Not long after, a yellow tentacled creature claims responsibility for the phenomenon. He soon proves to be unable to be killed by the world governments due to his arsenal of superpowers including accelerated regeneration, visual cloning, near-impenetrable skin, and the ability to move and fly at Mach 20. The creature claims that within a year, he will destroy the planet next. However, he offers mankind a chance to avert this fate.

Per the resulting agreement, the creature becomes a teacher at Kunugigaoka Junior High School, his students being members of Class 3–E, a class that is intentionally disadvantaged academically due to low grades, inability to meet the school's strict rules and policies, and other forms of cruel and unusual punishment. Each of the students are granted the chance to kill the creature, whom they dub "Koro-sensei", (Note: 殺せんせー, Koro sensē; a portmanteau of korosenai (殺せない; lit. 'unkillable') and sensei (先生; lit. 'teacher')) before his imposed deadline of the end of the school year, and are granted specialized weapons developed by the government that can kill him; furthermore, Koro-sensei is forbidden from harming the students in any capacity. In addition to teaching them regular subjects, Koro-sensei also teaches them the ways of assassination so that they can kill him in the future. The Japanese government promises a reward of ¥10 billion to whoever among the students succeeds in killing Koro-sensei. However, this proves to be a virtually impossible task not only due to his superpowers and death anxiety, but because he is also the best teacher they could ask for, helping them to improve their grades, individual skills, and prospects for the future. As time goes on, the situation gets even more complicated as other assassins come after Koro-sensei's life, some coveting the reward, others for personal reasons. The students eventually learn the secrets involving him, the Moon's destruction, his ties with their previous homeroom teacher, and the true reason why he must be killed before the end of the school year.

== Media ==
=== Manga ===
Assassination Classroom, written and illustrated by Yusei Matsui, was serialized in Shueisha's shōnen manga magazine Weekly Shōnen Jump from July 2, 2012, to March 16, 2016. Shueisha collected its 180 chapters in twenty-one tankōbon volumes, released from November 2, 2012, and July 4, 2016. A VOMIC (voiced comic) version, which added voice clips to the manga pages, was featured on the Sakiyomi Jan Bang! variety show between January and June 2013. In North America, the series was licensed for English release by Viz Media. The twenty-one volumes were released between December 2, 2014, and April 3, 2018.

A spin-off manga, titled Koro Sensei Quest, written and illustrated by Kizuku Watanabe and Jō Aoto, was serialized in Shueisha's Saikyō Jump magazine from October 2, 2015, to October 4, 2019.

=== Anime ===
An original video animation (OVA) based on the series was produced by Brain's Base for the Jump Super Anime Tour and shown at five Japanese cities between October 6 and November 24, 2013. It was bundled with the seventh volume of the manga, released on December 27, 2013.

An anime television series based on the manga began airing on Fuji TV from January 9, 2015, and ran for 22 episodes. The anime television series was directed by Seiji Kishi at Lerche, with Kazuki Morita as character designer and Makoto Uezu as the lead scriptwriter. An OVA episode was included on the first BD/DVD volume released on March 27, 2015, following a screening at Jump Special Anime Fest in November 2014. The anime had been licensed by Funimation, who simulcast the series as it aired and began a broadcast dub version from February 18, 2015. Following Sony's acquisition of Crunchyroll, the series was moved to Crunchyroll. The first opening theme is "Seishun Satsubatsu-ron", (Note: 青春サツバツ論, lit. 'Youth Murder Theory') while the second opening theme is "Jiriki Hongan Revolution"; (Note: 自力本願レボリューション, lit. 'Self-Reliance Original Wish Revolution') both are performed by 3-nen E-gumi Utatan (Note: 3年E組うた担), a 5-member group consisting of the characters Nagisa Shiota (Mai Fuchigami), Kaede Kayano (Aya Suzaki), Karma Akabane (Nobuhiko Okamoto), Yūma Isogai (Ryota Osaka), and Hiroto Maehara (Shintaro Asanuma). The two openings were released as singles on February 18 and May 27 respectively. The ending theme is "Hello, shooting star" by Moumoon.

The second season of the anime began airing on January 7, 2016, and ran for 25 episodes. The third opening theme is "Question" and the fourth is "Bye Bye Yesterday" (Note: バイバイ YESTERDAY) by 3-nen E-gumi Utatan, (Note: 3年E組うた担) with singles released on February 24 and May 25 respectively. The second ending theme is "Kaketa Tsuki" (Note: 欠けた月, lit. 'Waning Moon') and the third is "Mata Kimi ni Aeru hi" (Note: また君に会える日, lit. 'Until the day we can see you again') by Shion Miyawaki. Anime Limited has licensed both seasons in the UK.

Adult Swim's Toonami programming block began broadcasting Funimation's English dub of the anime starting on August 30, 2020.

As part of the series' tenth anniversary campaign, the series began to be rebroadcast on Fuji TV on April 10, 2025. The theme songs for each season feature newly composed tracks. The first opening theme is "Caution" (known in Japanese as "Kiiro Shingo" (黄色信号; lit. 'Yellow Light') by Sora Tomonari and the first ending theme is "Tsuki no Fune" (ツキノフネ; lit. 'Moon Ship') by Atarayo. The second opening theme is "Last Look" (ラストルック, Rasuto Rukku) by Keina Suda.

==== Films ====
On June 30, 2016, two anime films were announced: Assassination Classroom the Movie: 365 Days and Koro Sensei Quest!. Both aired on November 19, 2016.

In September 2025, a compilation film was announced. Titled Assassination Classroom the Movie: Our Time (劇場版「暗殺教室」みんなの時間, Gekijō-ban Ansatsu Kyōshitsu Minna no Jikan), the film premiered in Japanese theaters on March 20, 2026. The film collects episodes cut from the anime due to time constraints. Original manga author Matsui stated it serves not only as a tenth anniversary project but also as continuation of the main story. Sora Tomonari performed the film's theme song, "Teacher". Crunchyroll began streaming the film on July 23, 2026.

==== Singles ====
List of singles, with selected chart positions
Title	Year	Peak chart positions	Album
Title	Year	JPN	Album
"Seishun Satsubatsuron"	2015	26	Non-album singles
"Jiriki Hongan Revolution"	2015	37	Non-album singles
"Question"	2016	46	Non-album singles
"Bye Bye Yesterday"	2016	49	Non-album singles

=== Live-action films ===
A live-action film was released in Japan on March 21, 2015, with Hey! Say! JUMP's Ryosuke Yamada as the main character, and Arashi's Kazunari Ninomiya voicing the tentacled teacher Koro sensei. It opened at number one on the Japanese box office with $3.42 million and as of April 5, 2015, has grossed over $20 million. It was the tenth highest-grossing Japanese film at the Japanese box office in 2015, with ¥2.77 billion (US$23 million). A second film, titled Assassination Classroom: Graduation, was released on March 25, 2016, with most of the cast from the original appearing.

=== Video games ===
A video game based on the series, Assassination Classroom: Grand Siege on Koro-sensei, (Note: 暗殺教室 殺せんせー大包囲網!!, Ansatsu Kyōshitsu: Koro-sensei Dai Hōimō) was developed by Bandai Namco Games and released on Nintendo 3DS in Japan on March 12, 2015. In January of the same year, Bandai Namco also announced a mobile game based on the Assassination Classroom series, titled Assassination Classroom: Enclosure Time. (Note: 暗殺教室 囲い込みの時間, Ansatsu Kyōshitsu: Kakoikomi no Jikan) The mobile game released later the same year. A sequel to the 3DS game, Assassination Classroom: Assassin Raising Project!!, (Note: 暗殺教室 アサシン育成計画!!, Ansatsu Kyōshitsu: Assassin Ikusei Keikaku!!) was released by Bandai Namco for the Nintendo 3DS on March 24, 2016, exclusively in Japan.

Koro-sensei appears as a playable character in J-Stars Victory VS, originally released in Japan for PlayStation 3 and PlayStation Vita on March 19, 2014, with an international version, J-Stars Victory VS+, released for PS3, PS Vita, and PlayStation 4 in June 2015.

== Reception ==
=== Manga ===
==== Sales ====
By May 2013, over one million copies of the first volume were printed, and individual volumes frequently appeared on the lists of best-selling manga in Japan. Volumes 2, 3, 4, 1, 5, and 6 placed 26th, 32nd, 36th, 37th, 41st, and 50th respectively on the list of the best-selling manga volumes of 2013, making it the seventh best-selling manga series in Japan of 2013 with 4,595,820 copies sold. By September 2016, the manga had over 25 million copies in circulation. By October 2023, it had over 27 million copies in circulation.

==== Accolades ====
Assassination Classroom ranked first in "Nationwide Bookstore Employees' Recommended Comics" by the Honya Club website in 2013. It was nominated for the 6th Manga Taishō. It placed second in male-oriented comics category on the list of "Book of the Year" by Media Factory and manga news magazine Da Vinci. Nippon Shuppan Hanbai elected it the best work of 2013 in their "Recommended Comic Books Across the Country Clerk's Choice". It ranked first on the 2014 Kono Manga ga Sugoi! Top 20 Manga for Male Readers survey by Takarajimasha. In February 2015, Asahi Shimbun announced that Assassination Classroom was one of nine nominees for the nineteenth annual Tezuka Osamu Cultural Prize. It was nominated for the Best U.S. Edition of International Material—Asia in the 2016 Eisner Award. On TV Asahi's Manga Sōsenkyo 2021 poll, in which 150,000 people voted for their top 100 manga series, Assassination Classroom ranked 51st.

==== Controversies ====
In 2023, the manga was removed from some American school libraries—for example, at Gifford Middle School, Florida, and at the Elmbrook School District, Wisconsin—due to its depiction of violence, especially gun violence and towards teachers. The series was also challenged on the basis of its sexually explicit imagery by the Citizens Defending Freedom organization, politician Tim Anderson, and a parent who expressed their concern about the "sexualization of minors". In 2024, the Horry County Schools school district removed copies of the manga from its school libraries after the mother of a ninth grader at Socastee High School complained to the district regarding the series' content. According to a 2025 report by PEN America, which documented public school bans, the series was removed at least 54 times from school libraries in the United States from 2024 to 2025.

=== Anime ===
In November 2019, Polygon named Assassination Classroom as one of the best anime of the 2010s.
