= Satoshi Suzuki =

Japanese screenwriter

Satoshi Suzuki (鈴木 智, Suzuki Satoshi) is a Japanese screenwriter.

== Selected works ==
=== Television ===
- Ultraman: Towards the Future (1992)
- Kenkaya Ukon (1993)
- Meibugyo Toyama no Kin-san (1993)
- Ultraman Cosmos (2002)
- Kinyu Fushoku Retto Saisei (2005)
- Neuro: Supernatural Detective (2007) – series head writer
- Top Secret ~The Revelation~ (2008) – series head writer
- Aoi Bungaku (2009)
- Jidankoshonin Gota Keshi (2011)
- Himitsu Chouhouin Erika (2011)
- Chihayafuru (2011–2012)
- Akagawa Jiro Gensaku Doku Poison (2012)
- Tokusou (2014)
- Shi no Zouki (2015)
- Hitoya no Toge ~Goku no Toge~ (2017)
- Ultraman Z (2020)

=== Films ===
- Spellbound (1999) — Nominated: Japan Academy Prize for best screenplay
- Lorelei: The Witch of the Pacific Ocean (2005)
- Moyuru Toki: The Excellent Company (2006)
- Berna no Shippo (2006)
- Dare mo Mamotte Kurenai (2009)
- The Incite Mill (2010)
