= Neuro: Supernatural Detective =

Japanese manga series by Yusei Matsui and its adaptations

- First tankōbon volume cover, featuring Neuro Nōgami

魔人探偵脳噛ネウロ
- Genre: Black comedy; Dark fantasy; Occult detective
- Manga
- Written by: Yusei Matsui
- Published by: Shueisha
- Imprint: Jump Comics
- Magazine: Weekly Shōnen Jump
- Original run: February 21, 2005 – April 20, 2009
- Volumes: 23
- Anime television series
- Directed by: Hiroshi Kōjina
- Produced by: Toshio Nakatani; Manabu Tamura
- Written by: Satoshi Suzuki
- Music by: Tomoki Hasegawa
- Studio: Madhouse (Note: Production assistance (制作協力) for all episodes provided by Studio Live.)
- Licensed by: NA: Viz Media
- Original network: Nippon TV
- Original run: October 3, 2007 – March 26, 2008
- Episodes: 25
- icon

Neuro: Supernatural Detective, known in Japan as Majin Tantei Nōgami Neuro (魔人探偵 脳噛ネウロ; lit. 'Demon Detective Neuro Nōgami'), is a Japanese manga series written and illustrated by Yusei Matsui. The series follows Neuro Nōgami, a demon who depends on mysteries for sustenance. Having consumed all the mysteries in the demon world, Neuro travels to the human world in search of more. There, Neuro recruits high school student Yako Katsuragi as a facade for a detective agency. The supernatural-themed manga was created because Matsui considered himself unable to draw humans.

The manga was originally serialized in Shueisha's Weekly Shōnen Jump from February 2005 to April 2009, with its chapters collected in 23 tankōbon (bound volumes). A 25-episode anime television series directed by Hiroshi Kōjina and animated by Madhouse was originally broadcast on Nippon Television from October 2007 to March 2008. In 2011, the anime series was licensed by Viz Media and uploaded to the company's website. Neuro: Supernatural Detective has spawned a light novel, two audio albums, two video games, and other merchandise.

Neuro: Supernatural Detective's manga has been popular in Japan, frequently ranking in the weekly top ten list of best-selling manga. It has sold over four million volumes in Japan. The anime, however, has been criticized by fans because it deviates from Matsui's work, and received a low viewership. Critics of anime and manga often compared it to Case Closed, noting supernatural themes as the only difference between them.

== Plot ==
The series' central character is Neuro Nōgami (脳噛 ネウロ, Nōgami Neuro), a demon who eats mysteries. Because he has eaten every mystery in the demon world, he comes to the human world to feast on the mysteries offered by humans. As a demon, he does not want to make his presence in the human world widely known. He makes an arrangement with a 16-year-old high school girl Yako Katsuragi (桂木 弥子, Katsuragi Yako)—who wants to solve the mystery of her father's murder, which was declared a suicide by the police. They establish a detective agency and, together with former criminal Shinobu Godai (吾代 忍, Godai Shinobu) and a sentient braid of hair called Akane (あかねちゃん, Akane-chan), solve crimes to feed Neuro's appetite.

== Production ==
Before the series' regular serialization in Weekly Shōnen Jump, Yusei Matsui published two one-shots. The first one was published in the summer issue of Akamaru Jump; it won the Jump Jūni Ketsu Shinjin Manga Award in the horror mystery category. After the first was "extremely well received" according to Shueisha, the second one-shot was released on September 6, 2004, in issue 41 of Weekly Shōnen Jump.

Prior to the start of the series, he was not sure whether it would be a detective manga or a romantic one. Although he does not like detective stories, Matsui nevertheless chose to write one because it was a genre that was not covered in the magazine that time. However, Matsui considers Neuro the antithesis to "orthodox detective manga" like Case Closed or Kindaichi Case Files because of Neuro's supernatural powers. Furthermore, he did not want to create a detective's reasoning manga because he does not like to read or draw it. He said that reasoning scenes are superfluous, so he placed some jokes in these scenes.

Matsui was not good at drawing humans or real life things, and he was about to lose his self-confidence when he "threw things in at random" to create the series. Matsui mixed his creation with real things to make his style original. To create the atmosphere of the series, Matsui used as reference paintings by Rei Kamoi, a Japanese artist he saw on television, and Gōjin Ishihara, the illustrator of Edogawa Ranpo's Shōnen Tantei Dan. Matsui's creative process of art is to begin drawing erotic and grotesque images and at the same time humorous and cute scenes. Matsui did not wish to create "terrifying characters" but "funny-terrifying" and "terrifying-cute". He also tried to avoid men's idealized image of heroines and women's idealized images of heroes. Matsui decided to create characters that could exist in the real world and to make their acts and reactions realistic. As such, elaborating on "why people would create such complex tricks in order to murder someone, [he] wanted to convey the extent to which humans will go in pursuit of a goal".

== Media ==
=== Manga ===
Written and illustrated by Yusei Matsui, the manga was originally serialized by Shueisha in the Japanese magazine Weekly Shōnen Jump from February 21, 2005, to April 20, 2009. Shueisha compiled the 202 chapters into 23 tankōbon (collected volumes) released from July 4, 2005, to August 4, 2009. It has also been published as part of the Shueisha Jump Remix series of magazine-style books. Five volumes were released between January 7 and March 7, 2011. Between October 12 and 16, 2012, the 23 volumes were re-published digitally under the Jump Comics Digital line. The series started to be released on bunkoban format by Shueisha on January 18, 2013, and it lasted twelve volumes, the last of which was published on June 18 of that same year. Volumes 11 and 12 of the bunkoban edition included the two one-shots that preceded its serialization.

Outside Japan, it has been licensed in some countries such as in France by Glénat, in Hong Kong by Culturecom, in Italy and Spain by Planeta DeAgostini, in South Korea by Seoul Media Group, and in Taiwan by Tong Li Publishing.

=== Anime ===
The production of an anime series was announced in 33rd issue of Weekly Shōnen Jump released on July 14, 2007. The Neuro: Supernatural Detective anime adaptation was produced by Madhouse, Nippon Television, Shueisha, D.N. Dream Partners and VAP and directed by Hiroshi Kōjina, with Satoshi Suzuki handling series composition, Mika Takahashi designing the characters and Tomoki Hasegawa composing the music. The series, consisting of 25 television episodes, originally aired from October 3, 2007, to March 26, 2008, on Nippon TV; (Note: Nippon TV listed the series air dates on Tuesday at 25:29, which is effectively Wednesday at 1:29 a.m. JST.) it was later broadcast by four of Nippon TV's affiliated stations. VAP distributed the anime in DVD format; nine volumes were released between December 21, 2007, and August 27, 2008, and a DVD box set was released on September 30, 2008. The series was acquired by Viz Media, which renamed it Neuro: Supernatural Detective and streamed it from February 18, 2011, to July 1, 2011, on its website VizAnime.com, and on Hulu. An official soundtrack composed by Tomoki Hasegawa was released on December 21, 2007, by VAP.

=== Related media ===
Two audio dramas were released on November 6, 2006, and April 25, 2007, by Shueisha. A light novel titled Majin Tantei Nōgami Neuro: Sekai no Hate ni wa Chō ga Mau (Note: 魔人探偵脳噛ネウロ 世界の果てには蝶が舞う; lit. 'Demon Detective Neuro Nōgami: The Butterfly that Dances at the End of the World') was written by Akira Higashiyama and published by Shueisha on July 20, 2007. On November 21, 2007, Data House released a book written by the Neuro Study Group titled Majin Tantei Nōgami Neuro no Himitsu. (Note: 魔人探偵脳噛ネウロの秘密; lit. 'Demon Detective Neuro Nōgami Secrets') On March 6, 2008, Majin Tantei Nōgami Neuro: Kanzen Shinri Kaiseki-sho (Note: 魔人探偵脳噛ネウロ完全心理解析書; lit. 'Demon Detective Neuro Nōgami: Full Psychological Analysis Document') written by Kōichi Mizuide was released by Kazan. In Japan, action figures, bags, chawan, T-shirts, mouse pads, fridge magnets, and other products were sold as merchandise for the series.

=== Video games ===
A Nintendo DS game titled Majin Tantei Nōgami Neuro: Neuro and Yako no Bishoku Sanmai Suiritsuki Gourmet and Mystery (Note: 魔人探偵脳噛ネウロ ネウロと弥子の美食三昧 推理つき グルメ＆ミステリー, Majin Tantei Nōgami Neuro: Neuro to Yako no Bishoku Sanmai Suiritsuki Gurume to Misuterī) was produced by Audio and released by Marvelous Entertainment on June 12, 2008. Majin Tantei Nougami Neuro: Battle Da Yo! Hannin Shūgō!, (Note: 魔人探偵脳噛ネウロ バトルだヨ！ 犯人集合!, Majin Tantei Nougami Neuro Batoru Da Yo! Hannin Shūgō!) a PlayStation 2 game, was also released on August 28, 2008. Neuro Nōgami appeared in the Nintendo DS game Jump Ultimate Stars as a battle character, using Yako for some of his attacks. Akane, X and Sasazuka appeared as help characters. Neuro appears as a support character in the crossover fighting game J-Stars Victory VS.

== Reception ==
=== Public response ===
The manga had sold 4.4 million in Japan; individual volumes frequently appeared on the lists of best-selling manga there. Fans of the manga series responded negatively to its anime adaptation, criticizing the alterations made to the characterizations and stories. Japanese website New Akiba, hosted a petition intended to show fans' dissatisfaction and to ask Madhouse and Nippon Television to be more faithful to the original work. In North America, it was also not well received, according to Viz Media's representative Amy Mar who said the show is of low priority since it has not been among the most-watched on VizAnime.

=== Critical response ===
Manga Sanctuary praised the protagonist for being original and unique. It criticized the fact that the reader does not have access to some facts that could help to solve the mysteries. The reviewer said it is unfortunate because the readers feels passive, which is not desirable in a crime series. However, Manga News said that this impassivity is good because it is what differentiates Neuro from Case Closed. Its design, setting, the "interesting and well-constructed characters", and the development of the relationship between Neuro and Yako were also praised. The reviewer said the series is "completely apart in the world of manga, Neuro is a genre unto itself which is between several styles and therefore appeal to a wider audience." Animeland's critic also compared it to Case Closed, but said its black humor, cruel and deadpan laughs were "quite caustic."

Anime News Network's Carlo Santos said that the series walks "the line between serious sleuth drama and supernatural spell-fest", "balancing all that with the occasional joke". He said the graphic violence is the best part of the series, praised the Madhouse animation and described it as "Case Closed with spirit powers". Serdar Yegulalp from About.com said it has "[a]n interesting concept", is "competent enough", and "has a few fun twists", but that apart from the supernatural elements it does not bring anything that has not already been done in Case Closed. Writing for Mania.com, Chris Beveridge said the anime operates principally around the two main characters; he said that it is "more interesting to watch how Neuro and Yako operate, to understand methods and personalities, more than the actual event. And that weakens the episode because it never feels like we're really drawn into the mystery itself." Beveridge added it "has some good production values", but criticized Neuro's appearance, "which is bordering on comical" as it makes it difficult for the series "to go a darker route".

== Notes ==
Japanese names

Explanatory notes
