= Yusei Matsui =

Japanese manga artist (born 1979)

Yusei Matsui 松井優征
- Born: January 31, 1979 (age 47) Iruma, Saitama, Japan
- Area: Manga artist
- Notable works: Neuro: Supernatural Detective; Assassination Classroom; The Elusive Samurai

Yusei Matsui (松井優征, Matsui Yūsei) is a Japanese manga artist. He was an assistant of Yoshio Sawai, the manga artist of Bobobo-bo Bo-bobo. He wrote and illustrated the manga series Neuro: Supernatural Detective, Assassination Classroom, and The Elusive Samurai.

== Career ==
In 2000, with "Rubbing Dead" (an unknown manga), he won the fascinating manga award at the 51st manga festival, judged by the public who were surprised by the drawing style.

Neuro: Supernatural Detective was originally serialized in Shueisha's shōnen manga magazine Weekly Shōnen Jump from February 2005 to April 2009, with its chapters collected in 23 tankōbon (bound volumes). A 25-episode anime television series directed by Hiroshi Kōjina and animated by Madhouse was originally broadcast on Nippon Television from October 2007 to March 2008. In 2011, the anime series was licensed by Viz Media and uploaded to the company's website. Neuro: Supernatural Detective has spawned a light novel, two audio albums, two video games, and other merchandise.

From 2012 to 2016, he produced his new series "Assassination Classroom" was serialized in Weekly Shōnen Jump from July 2012 to March 2016, with its chapters collected in 21 tankōbon volumes. It is also adapted into an anime.

The Elusive Samurai was serialized in Weekly Shōnen Jump from January 2021 to February 2026, with its chapters collected in 23 tankōbon volumes as of December 2025. The series won the 69th Shogakukan Manga Award in 2024.

== Works ==
| Title | Year | Notes | Refs |
|---|---|---|---|
| Neuro: Supernatural Detective | 2005–2009 | Serialized in Weekly Shōnen Jump; compiled in 23 volumes | |
| Rikon Choutei | 2009 | One-shot in Weekly Shōnen Jump | |
| Tokyo Depato Sensou Taikenki | 2011 | One-shot in Jump Next | |
| Assassination Classroom | 2012–2016 | Serialized in Weekly Shōnen Jump; compiled in 21 volumes | |
| F-Ken | 2019 | One-shot in Weekly Shōnen Jump | |
| The Elusive Samurai | 2021–2026 | Serialized in Weekly Shōnen Jump | |
