= Assassination Classroom season 1 =

Assassination Classroom
- Season 1
- Cover of the first DVD volume of Assassination Classroom released by Avex Pictures, featuring Nagisa Shiota, Karma Akabane, and Kaede Kayano
- No. of episodes: 22

Release
- Original network: Fuji TV
- Original release: January 9 – June 15, 2015

Season chronology
- Next → Season 2

Assassination Classroom is an anime series adapted from Yūsei Matsui's manga series of the same name. Produced by Lerche and directed by Seiji Kishi, the first season was broadcast in Japan on Fuji TV from January 9 to June 19, 2015. The series is licensed in North America by Funimation, who simulcast the subtitled version as it aired and streamed an English dub version from February 18, 2015. Adult Swim's Toonami programming block began broadcasting Funimation's English dub of the series on August 30, 2020.

The opening theme for episodes 1–11 is "Seishun Satsubatsu-ron" (青春サツバツ論; "The Theory of Savage Youth") while the opening theme for episodes 12–22 is "Jiriki Hongan Revolution" (自力本願レボリューション; "Self-reliant Revolution"), both performed by 3-E Utatan. (Note: 3-E Utatan (3年E組うた担, Class 3-E Singing Group) is formed of Mai Fuchigami, Nobuhiko Okamoto, Aya Suzaki, Ryōta Ōsaka, and Shintarō Asanuma. In episodes 7–8 of the first season, however, the opening theme is performed by 3-E Shūgakuryokō 4-han (3年E組 修学旅行4班, Class 3-E School Trip Group 4), composed of Fuchigami, Okamoto, Suzaki, Satomi Satō, Sayuri Yahagi, and Yoshitaka Yamaya.) The ending theme is "Hello, shooting star" by Moumoon.

== Episodes ==
Season 1 episodes
No. overall	No. in season	English title (Note: All English titles are taken from Funimation.) Japanese title	Directed by	Storyboarded by	Original release date	English air date
1	1	"Assassination Time"; Transliteration: "Ansatsu no Jikan" (Japanese: 暗殺の時間)	Masahiro Mukai	Seiji Kishi	January 9, 2015	August 30, 2020
A tentacled creature of unknown origin destroys over seventy percent of the moon, and he announces that he will destroy the world in one year. Nonetheless, Ministry of Defense government worker Tadaomi Karasuma allows the creature to be the teacher of Kunugigaoka Junior High School's Class 3-E. The students are given weapons specially designed to hurt the creature and are offered a reward of ten billion yen to whoever can assassinate him before graduation. However, none of the students are able to assassinate him due to his Mach 20 speed. Class bully Ryōma Terasaka convinces Nagisa Shiota to wear a grenade filled with pellets. When the creature gets sleepy after assigning the students to write a poem, Terasaka has Nagisa come within close range of the creature and detonates the grenade, but the creature sheds his skin to protect himself and Nagisa from the blast. The creature threatens the other students' loved ones, noting that the deal he and the government struck did not keep him from harming anyone else. He advises them to refrain from coming up with plans that will harm others. Kaede Kayano, with the class's help, names the creature Koro-sensei, seeing him as an "unkillable teacher".
2	2	"Baseball Time"; Transliteration: "Yakyū no Jikan" (Japanese: 野球の時間)	Takashi Kobayashi	Takashi Kobayashi	January 16, 2015	September 6, 2020
While Koro-sensei is reading a newspaper, Nagisa encourages Tomohito Sugino to attempt to assassinate Koro-sensei by pitching a baseball embedded with pellets. However, Koro-sensei easily dodges the baseball and catches it with a baseball glove. Later after lunchtime, Sugino is downhearted when Koro-sensei crushes his dream of being a pro baseball star, but this is due to his wrists and elbows not being as flexible as they should be. Koro-sensei encourages Sugino to focus on his own strengths for future attempts of assassination. The students of Class 3-E fail to kill Koro-sensei, even when he deliberately ties himself to a tree branch. Karasuma joins Class 3-E as the physical education teacher, observing how the class is ridiculed by the other students of the school. Another student due to transfer into the class is informed of his mission.
3	3	"Karma Time"; Transliteration: "Karuma no Jikan" (Japanese: カルマの時間)	Akiyo Ohashi	Takuya Minezawa	January 30, 2015 (Note: The January 23, 2015 television broadcast of episode 3 on Fuji TV was delayed due to [sic] "various circumstances". The 2015 capture of two Japanese nationals by the terrorist organization ISIS has been speculated as one of the reasons.)	September 13, 2020
Karma Akabane transfers into Class 3-E following a suspension, managing to inflict some damage to Koro-sensei by giving a handshake with knife shards cleverly taped to his hand. While the students later take a quiz, Karma steals Koro-sensei's special gelato to get his attention, shooting him with an unloaded gun to catch him off guard. After hearing word from Nagisa that Koro-sensei worships the octopus, Karma leaves a dead octopus on Koro-sensei's desk. However, Koro-sensei cooks it into takoyaki to ridicule Karma. Throughout the day, Koro-sensei manages to anticipate every prank Karma tries to pull. As a last resort, Karma jumps off a cliff with a gun in hand, which would determine if Koro-sensei would risk his life for a student or would destroy his pride as a teacher. However, Koro-sensei manages to save Karma use his tentacles as a giant spiderweb, leading Karma to accept Koro-sensei as a teacher.
4	4	"Grown-Up Time"; Transliteration: "Otona no Jikan" (Japanese: 大人の時間)	Yusuke Kamada	Yusuke Kamada	February 6, 2015	September 20, 2020
The students of Class 3-E are introduced to their new foreign language teacher, Irina Jelavić, who is actually a professional Serbian assassin with no interest in teaching the students. After being seduced by her, Nagisa shares all of his notes about Koro-sensei's weak points to Irina. When Koro-sensei returns, Irina ropes him into the storage shed, so that her team of assassins can kill him. However, this fails as a result of using the wrong ammo on purpose and ignoring his keen sense of smell. Later, after the students of Class 3-E rebel against Irina when she refuses to teach them properly, Karasuma shows her how dedicated Koro-sensei is to teaching each of his students and how important education is for assassination. Realizing the error of her ways, Irina begins to earnestly teach her students, helping them learn the art of communication.
5	5	"Assembly Time"; Transliteration: "Shūkai no Jikan" (Japanese: 集会の時間)	Noriyuki Noya	Goichi Iwahata	February 13, 2015	September 27, 2020
Manami Okuda attempts to poison Koro-sensei, but to no effect. She has poor communication skills, but she has a passion for chemistry. Because of this, Koro-sensei offers to help Manami make an effective poison. However, it turns out to be a tonic that transforms him into a speedier liquid form, teaching Manami to improve her communication skills so she can successfully deceive him someday. Later, the students of Class 3-E are forced to travel from their old campus and head to the main campus to endure a school assembly. The students from others classes become envious due to the students of Class 3-E having Karasuma and Irina as cool teachers. Koro-sensei shows his support by disguising himself as a scholar, providing extra copies of handouts previously not given to Class 3-E. Afterwards, Nagisa manages to use his experiences in Class 3-E to handle himself against Nobuta Tanaka and Chōsuke Takada, two bullies from the main campus.
6	6	"Test Time"; Transliteration: "Tesuto no Jikan" (Japanese: テストの時間)	Takashi Kobayashi	Takashi Kobayashi	February 20, 2015	October 4, 2020
School principal Gakuhō Asano pays a visit to Class 3-E to greet Koro-sensei. Having noticed how Nagisa stood up to Nobuta and Chōsuke, Gakuhō tells Koro-sensei to adhere to his educational system, which requires Class 3-E to be at its poorest to encourage the other students. Noticing the students of Class 3-E only caring about the bounty reward rather than getting high grades, Koro-sensei issues the ultimatum of leaving and destroying the school, should any of the students fail to score well enough in the midterm exams to rank among the top fifty students. During the midterm exams, the students of Class 3-E use what they learned from Koro-sensei's teaching methods to tackle each question they come across. However, they are stopped in their tracks by questions that Gakuhō had added at the last minute without informing Class 3-E of the changes, resulting in none of the students other than Karma ranking among the top fifty students. Downhearted from underestimating Gakuhō, Koro-sensei receives some encouragement from his class and becomes determined to turn things around for the final exams.
7	7	"School Trip Time/1st Period"; Transliteration: "Shūgakuryokō no Jikan: Ichi-Jikan-me" (Japanese: 修学旅行の時間・1時間目)	Takashi Kobayashi	Takashi Kobayashi	February 27, 2015	October 11, 2020
The students of Class 3-E prepare for a field trip to Kyoto, which is also being used as a venue to assassinate Koro-sensei. The students are arranged into groups, in which Nagisa, Kaede, Karma, Sugino, Manami and class idol Yukiko Kanzaki agree to be in a group. On the train ride to Kyoto, high school male delinquents steal Yukiko's itinerary noting the group activities. On the next day, the group visits all the assassination landmarks, but they are ambushed by the male delinquents, who kidnap Kaede and Yukiko. Whilst in captivity, Yukiko laments to Kaede about her rebellious acts due to being raised in a strict family. Nagisa, Karma, Sugino and Manami manage to use an extensive guidebook written by Koro-sensei, which provides a thorough procedure for hostage situations, to deduce where Kaede and Yukiko are being held. Koro-sensei arrives to deal with the delinquents, while Nagisa and the others knock out the delinquents with their guidebooks. Following the incident, Yukiko is encouraged by Koro-sensei's words of wisdom, in which those with the will to drive forward will come out strong regardless of situation or status.
8	8	"School Trip Time/2nd Period"; Transliteration: "Shūgakuryokō no Jikan: Ni-Jikan-me" (Japanese: 修学旅行の時間・2時間目)	Yusuke Kamada	Goichi Iwahata	March 6, 2015	October 18, 2020
While the other groups are accompanying Koro-sensei on a tour of Kyoto, a sniper known as Red Eye is tasked with assassinating him at various spots. However, each of his attempts to shoot him are thwarted by improbable means, and his mission is called off when Nagisa's group gets into trouble with the high school male delinquents. Later that evening, Red Eye is approached by Koro-sensei himself, who treats Red Eye to a meal, thanking him for making the field trip a valuable learning experience for his students due to his assassination efforts. Red Eye, understanding Koro-sensei's morals as a teacher, decides to quit his job in order to explore the world. Back at their hotel, private time among the boys and girls eventually turns into a hunt for Koro-sensei when he eavesdrops on their gossips. Koro-sensei hides from the students, telling Karasuma that the students wanted him to talk about his past love life. As the field trip comes to a close, the world government prepares two special assassins to transfer into Class 3-E.
9	9	"Transfer Student Time"; Transliteration: "Tenkōsei no Jikan" (Japanese: 転校生の時間)	Kinome Yu	Noriaki Saito	March 13, 2015	October 25, 2020
The students of Class 3-E are greeted by their first transfer student, an artificial intelligence from Norway known as the Autonomous Intelligence Fixed Artillery, who uses calculations to assess the best way to shoot Koro-sensei, managing to blow off one of his fingertips with her second barrage of gunfire. However, the students quickly gets sick of her constantly firing her weapons during class, deciding to tape them shut themselves so they can study properly. After class, Koro-sensei makes some modifications to the Autonomous Intelligence Fixed Artillery, giving her a more human personality. The next day, the students appreciate her more and nickname her Ritsu. Later that night, Ritsu's inventors are outraged with the changes and decide to remove all the modifications. However, Ritsu manages to hide her new personality from them before it is deleted, deciding to secretly defy her inventors for the sake of keeping her promise to help her classmates.
10	10	"L and R Time"; Transliteration: "Eru Āru no Jikan" (Japanese: LRの時間)	Itoga Shintaro	Kinji Yoshimoto	March 20, 2015	November 8, 2020
Irina is caught off guard by retired Russian assassin Lovro Brovski, her former master, who advises her to give up trying to kill Koro-sensei. Instead, Koro-sensei proposes a match between Irina and Lovro to see who will be the first to "kill" Karasuma with a rubber knife, offering Karasuma his own incentive should neither of them win. Despite Lovro's doubts after he fails to "kill" Karasuma himself, Irina manages to use what she has learned targeting Koro-sensei to get close, with Karasuma accepting defeat at her hands and Lovro acknowledging her efforts. Nagisa, Karma and Ritsu later agree to accompany Koro-sensei at Mach 20 speed on a trip to Hawaii to watch the premiere of a new movie, getting a lecture along the way and learning a lot more about Koro-sensei's point of view. On their way back, a man in a white cloak observes alongside a boy, the second transfer student who claims to be Koro-sensei's younger brother.
11	11	"Transfer Student Time/2nd Period"; Transliteration: "Tenkōsei no Jikan: Ni-Jikan-me" (Japanese: 転校生の時間・2時間目)	Kinome Yu	Goichi Iwahata	March 27, 2015	November 15, 2020
The students of Class 3-E prepare for the arrival of their second transfer student, who is allegedly more powerful than Ritsu. The man in the white cloak named Shiro enters the classroom and introduces the boy named Itona Horibe, who surprises the other students with his relation to Koro-sensei. When Itona faces against Koro-sensei later that day, Koro-sensei is overwhelmed by the fact that Itona possesses tentacles in his hair. While Shiro uses his knowledge of Koro-sensei's weaknesses to give Itona the advantage, Koro-sensei counterattacks with rubber knives to push Itona out of the ring, thereby winning the match. Itona goes berserk after seeing himself as weak, so Shiro knocks him unconscious and carries him out of the classroom. The students interrogate Koro-sensei about his true origins, but he remains tight-lipped, stating that they must continue their mission in order to find the answers that they seek. The students ask Karasuma to teach them more techniques, as they are determined to kill Koro-sensei before anyone else.
12	12	"Ball Game Tournament Time"; Transliteration: "Kyūgi Taikai no Jikan" (Japanese: 球技大会の時間)	Itoga Shintaro	Takehiko Matsumoto	April 10, 2015	November 22, 2020
As a baseball tournament is to be held, the male students of Class 3-E are forced to play an exhibition match against the top players of the boys baseball club. Despite knowing the odds are against them, particularly when pitted against baseball club captain Kazutaka Shindō, Koro-sensei is prompted to coach the students for the match. On the day of the match, the students of Class 3-E use a bunting strategy to load the bases, allowing Sugino to help the team get an early lead. Not willing to let this slide, Gakuhō takes over as the baseball club's coach to put a stop to the bunting strategy, using the power of hypnosis to turn Shindō into a bloodthirsty warrior. With the bases now loaded against Class 3-E, Karma uses previous provocations he made concerning some unfair play to his own advantage, placing himself and class president Yūma Isogai very close to Shindō, who breaks down from trying to swing his baseball bat without hurting them. This allows the students of Class 3-E to win the match. Afterwards, Sugino expresses how he wanted to show off the friends he made in Class 3-E, managing to rekindle his old friendship with Shindō.
13	13	"Talent Time"; Transliteration: "Sainō no Jikan" (Japanese: 才能の時間)	Daisei Fukuoka	Noriaki Saito	April 17, 2015	December 6, 2020
Karasuma evaluates the progress of the students during their training, but he briefly senses a fearsome aura, like that of a python, coming from Nagisa. Soon after, Karasuma's colleague Akira Takaoka is sent to Class 3-E to take over as the new physical education teacher. He initially uses a lightheaded personality to attract the students, but his true nature as a ruthless and sadistic instructor is soon unveiled. When Karasuma withholds Takaoka from torturing the students any longer, Karasuma is challenged to pick one of his star pupils to use a real knife in a match against Takaoka. Karasuma nominates Nagisa, who uses the assassination skills he learned from Karasuma. Nagisa manages to get the upper hand on Takaoka and wins the match. When Takaoka violently objects to defeat, Karasuma beats him back. Gakuhō arrives, and fires Takaoka for his subpar teaching skills, emphasizing that physical violence is low-quality teaching and that Takaoka's authority has been stripped because of his defeat. He also states that he and not the Ministry of Defense controls the school. Karasuma returns to his position as the physical education teacher.
14	14	"Vision Time"; Transliteration: "Bijon no Jikan" (Japanese: ビジョンの時間)	Akiyo Ohashi	Hiroshi Kugimiya	April 24, 2015	December 13, 2020
Koro-sensei takes the students of Class 3-E to their own private pool that he made, but the students are alerted when Koro-sensei's tentacles swell up when soaked in water. Meanwhile, Terasaka becomes irritated when his friends Takuya Muramatsu and Taisei Yoshida are getting along with Koro-sensei. Terasaka agrees to collaborate with Shiro and Itona in their assassination plan, previously dropping a "bug bomb" in the classroom to excrete Koro-sensei's mucus and secretly adding a transmitter in the pool. Then, Terasaka gathers the other students in the pool, using a gun connected to the transmitter as a signal for Shiro and Itona. Instead, the transmitter sets off an explosion and puts the students in danger, forcing Koro-sensei to get his tentacles soaked in order to rescue the students from being swept away. Koro-sensei is left at the mercy of Itona, while Sumire Hara is hanging onto a tree branch nearby. Following Karma's plan, Terasaka uses his shirt still affected by the "bug bomb" to infect Itona, allowing Koro-sensei to rescue Hara whilst the other students splash water to halt Itona. Shiro and Itona are forced to withdraw yet again.
15	15	"End-of-Term Time"; Transliteration: "Kimatsu no Jikan" (Japanese: 期末の時間)	Fumio Ito	Noriaki Saito	May 1, 2015	January 3, 2021
With the final exams approaching, Koro-sensei offers an incentive, in which each student who gets the best overall score in their top subject will get to shoot off one of his tentacles during their next assassination attempt. Meanwhile, Shindō informs the students of Class 3-E about Class 3-A's Big Five (Gakushū Asano, Teppei Araki, Ren Sakakibara, Natsuhiko Koyama and Tomoya Seo), who are all determined to take Class 3-E down. When Nagisa, Manami, Yukiko, Isogai and Rio Nakamura go to study in the main campus library, the Big Five proposes a contest, stating whichever class snags the most top spots in the exams can demand anything from the losing class. While Class 3-A sets their sights on making Class 3-E show complete servitude to them, Koro-sensei proposes his own suggestion of what Class 3-E can ask from their opponents. With both classes determined to win, the stage for the end-of-term final exams is set.
16	16	"School's Out/1st Term"; Transliteration: "Shūgyō no Jikan: Ichi-gakki" (Japanese: 終業の時間・1学期)	Takashi Kobayashi	Takashi Kobayashi	May 8, 2015	January 10, 2021
The students of Class 3-E and the students of Class 3-A fight against each other to slay the test problems before them, with the students of Class 3-E benefiting from Koro-sensei's unique teaching methods. When the results are revealed, Nakamura scores higher than Tomoya in English; Isogai scores higher than Gakushū in social studies; and Manami scores higher than Koyama in science. Koro-sensei chides Karma for losing to Gakushū due to studying very little and being overconfident. Terasaka, Yoshida, Muramatsu and Kirara Hazama each earn an additional tentacle for scoring top marks in home economics, resulting in a total of seven tentacles overall. Having won the wager for the contest, the students of Class 3-E decide to use their reward, a summer vacation at an island resort in Okinawa, as the venue for their assassination attempt.
17	17	"Island Time"; Transliteration: "Shima no Jikan" (Japanese: 島の時間)	Itoga Shintaro	Hiroshi Kugimiya	May 15, 2015	January 17, 2021
Prior to their trip, biologist Hinano Kurahashi helps Nagisa, Sugino and Hiroto Maehara hunt for bugs, while pervert Taiga Okajima shows them his own trap laid out for Koro-sensei using a pile of porn magazines. However, Kurahashi becomes fascinated when Koro-sensei spots a rare stag beetle worth a ton of yen. Later, Lovro is called in to help train the students for their island assassination, taking interest in the two top marksmen of the class, Ryūnosuke Chiba and Rinka Hayami. After telling Nagisa about the world's most infamous assassin known only as The Reaper, Lovro decides to teach Nagisa a surefire assassination technique. The students of Class 3-E soon arrive at their island resort, making all the necessary preparations for their assassination. After having dinner, during which Koro-sensei inadvertently uses up his emergency shedding technique to get rid of sunburn, the class begin their assassination attempt aboard an on-sea chapel.
18	18	"Action Time"; Transliteration: "Kekkō no Jikan" (Japanese: 決行の時間)	Daisei Fukuoka	Yoshito Nishoji Daisei Fukuoka	May 22, 2015	January 24, 2021
Koro-sensei is forced to watch an hour-long movie edited and narrated by Kōki Mimura exposing all of Koro-sensei's embarrassing habits, used as a distraction from the chapel slowly filling with water and bloating up his tentacles. Once the students of Class 3-E shoot off the seven tentacles, they surround and block Koro-sensei with a hydraulic cage, allowing Chiba and Hayami to snipe him. However, Koro-sensei activates his ultimate defense, trapping himself in an indestructible crystal sphere, which will last for one day despite his limited movements. As the students lament their failed assassination attempt, many of them suddenly and severely fall ill. This is revealed to be the work of a mysterious third party who had spiked their drinks with a supposedly deadly virus, demanding that the remaining students and teachers bring him the immobilized Koro-sensei in exchange for the antidote. Deciding against the trade-off, Koro-sensei and Ritsu instead come up with a plan to infiltrate the high-security hotel and obtain the antidote.
19	19	"Pandemonium Time"; Transliteration: "Fukuma no Jikan" (Japanese: 伏魔の時間)	Yusuke Kamada	Yusuke Kamada	May 29, 2015	January 31, 2021
Manami and Kōtarō Takebayashi stay behind to take care of the poisoned students. A team of fifteen healthy students along with Karasuma, Irina and Koro-sensei scale up a mountainside to sneak into the hotel undetected. With the first floor lobby area heavily monitored by bodyguards, Irina uses the art of seduction and her skills in playing the piano to distract the bodyguards, so that the others can reach the next floor. On the third floor central hall, the group comes across their first opponent named Smog, who is responsible for serving the spiked drinks to poison the students with the virus. Smog hits Karasuma with a canister of paralysis gas, but Karasuma still musters up the strength to knock him out. On the fifth floor scenic walkway, the group finds their next opponent named Grip. Not intimidated when Grip easily breaks a glass window with his fist, Karma makes up for his failure in the final exams and steps up to fight against Grip.
20	20	"Karma Time/2nd Period"; Transliteration: "Karuma no Jikan: Ni-Jikan-me" (Japanese: カルマの時間・2時間目)	Akiyo Ohashi	Shinichi Masaki	June 5, 2015	February 7, 2021
After Karma dodges Grip with his fistful of grabs, Grip hits Karma with a canister of paralysis gas. However, Karma manages to cover his mouth with a handkerchief in time and hits Grip with another canister of paralysis gas, allowing the students to bind up Grip with duct tape and move onward with their mission. In order to unlock the back entrance to the stairs and reach the next floor undetected, Meg Kataoka has the female students dress up Nagisa as a girl, and they all make their way through the sixth floor lounge. A rich guy named Yūji Norita spots Nagisa and tries to impress by buying him a drink. However, when the girls call for Nagisa to leave with them, Yūji tries to stop them by dancing. Yūji ends up accidentally spilling a drink on a guest, prompting Hinata Okano to knock out the guest with a somersault kick before trouble arises. The students move on to the VIP floor, where Terasaka knocks out two bodyguards using some stun guns, obtaining two pistols that are given to Chiba and Hayami. Upon reaching a theater stage, the students face off against their next opponent named Gastro.
21	21	"XX Time"; Transliteration: "Takaoka no Jikan" (Japanese: 鷹岡の時間)	Wada Heisaku	Wada Heisaku	June 12, 2015	February 14, 2021
Gastro, who has a keen sense of pinpointing enemy gunfire, turns on all the stage lights, in which the students are forced to hide behind the theater seats. Koro-sensei instructs the students using varying nicknames in order to confuse Gastro about the students' movements, giving Chiba and Hayami the encouragement to rise above their failed assassination and get the drop on Gastro. Koro-sensei deduces that the mastermind is not an assassin, while Nagisa learns that Terasaka secretly has been infected with the virus this whole time. The students finally arrive on the top floor and discover that the mastermind is none other than Takaoka. He takes the antidote concealed in a suitcase and brings the group up to the roof. Wanting revenge for being humiliated during their previous knife fight, Takaoka calls up Nagisa to the heliport for a rematch. Takaoka demands Nagisa to kneel before him and apologize for pulling a cheap trick during their match. Although Nagisa complies with this, Takaoka detonates the antidote right in front of the class. This makes Nagisa pick up a knife in preparation to kill Takaoka.
22	22	"Nagisa Time"; Transliteration: "Nagisa no Jikan" (Japanese: 渚の時間)	Yoshito Nishoji Itoga Shintaro	Yoshito Nishoji Daisei Fukuoka	June 19, 2015	February 21, 2021
Before Nagisa completely gives into his anger, Terasaka throws a stun gun at him, urging him not to become a murderer and think about what is truly important. Despite being heavily beaten by Takaoka, Nagisa uses what he learned from Lovro to perform his secret technique. While Takaoka is focused on his knife, Nagisa drops it and surprises Takaoka with a sudden clap, and then using the stun gun to bring Takaoka to his knees. Then, Nagisa shocks Takaoka unconscious after leaving him with a smile. Smog, Grip and Gastro suddenly arrive and reveal that the virus they created is nothing more than temporary food poisoning, as they did not agree with Takaoka's harsh methods. The next day, the poisoned students recover from their symptoms and Koro-sensei emerges from his crystallized state. The students make the most of the remainder of their vacation before returning to school for the second term.

== Home media release ==
=== Japanese ===
Avex Pictures has released the series on Blu-ray and DVD, in a limited edition, in Japan from March 27, 2015, to October 28, 2016.

Avex Pictures (Japan, Blu-ray & DVD)
Volume		Episodes	Release date	Ref.
Season 1	1	1–2	March 27, 2015	
Season 1	2	3–5	April 24, 2015	
Season 1	3	6–8	May 29, 2015	
Season 1	4	9–11	June 26, 2015	
Season 1	5	12–14	July 31, 2015	
Season 1	6	15–17	August 28, 2015	
Season 1	7	18–20	September 25, 2015	
Season 1	8	21–22	October 30, 2015	

=== English ===
Funimation has released the series on Blu-ray and DVD in North America, in a regular and a limited edition, since May 17, 2016.

Funimation (North America, Blu-ray & DVD)
Volume		Episodes	Regular edition release date	Limited edition release date	Ref.
Season 1	1	1–11	May 17, 2016	May 17, 2016	
Season 1	2	12–22	August 16, 2016	August 16, 2016	
