= Assassination Classroom season 2 =

Assassination Classroom
- Season 2
- Cover of the first DVD volume of the second season of Assassination Classroom released by Avex Pictures, featuring Karma Akabane and Nagisa Shiota
- No. of episodes: 25

Release
- Original network: Fuji TV
- Original release: January 7 – June 30, 2016

Season chronology
- ← Previous; Season 1

The second and final season of the Assassination Classroom anime television series is adapted from Yūsei Matsui's manga series of the same name. Produced by Lerche and directed by Seiji Kishi, the second season aired between January 7, 2016, and June 30, 2016, and was simulcast by Funimation, who began releasing the broadcast dub version from February 10, 2016. Adult Swim's Toonami programming block began broadcasting Funimation's English dub of the season on January 9, 2022.

For the first fourteen episodes, the opening theme is "Question" by 3-E Utatan while the ending theme is "Kaketa Tsuki" (欠けた月; "Waning Moon") by Shion Miyawaki. From episodes 15–25, the opening theme is "Bye Bye Yesterday" (バイバイ YESTERDAY, Bai Bai Yesterday) by 3-E Utatan while the ending theme is "Mata Kimi ni Aeru no Hi" (また君に会える日; "Until the Day I See You Again") by Miyawaki.

== Episodes ==
No. overall	No. in season	English title (Note: All English titles are taken from Funimation.) Japanese title	Directed by	Storyboarded by	Original release date	English air date (Note: Adult Swim lists the season as premiering on January 8, 2022 at 12:30 a.m. (24:30) EST/PST, which is effectively January 9.)
23	1	"Summer Festival Time"; Transliteration: "Natsumatsuri no Jikan" (Japanese: 夏祭りの時間)	Yoshito Nishoji	Yoshito Nishoji	January 7, 2016	January 9, 2022
Before the summer vacation at the island resort comes to a close, Koro-sensei gives his students a test of courage inside a cave, pairing them up into couples in hopes of getting juicy gossip. Although this soon backfires, both Koro-sensei and the students quickly notice that Irina Jelavić has feelings towards Tadaomi Karasuma. Koro-sensei and the students decide to set up a romantic dinner for the two teachers to get them together. Irina kisses her napkin and places it on Karasuma's lips as a subtle confession before leaving, but Karasuma seems to be more focused on his duty rather getting her message. On the final day of summer vacation, Koro-sensei invites his students to the local summer festival. Meanwhile, Lovro Brovski is attacked by a mysterious assassin.
24	2	"Kaede Time"; Transliteration: "Kaede no Jikan" (Japanese: カエデの時間)	Itoga Shintaro	Noriaki Saito	January 14, 2016	January 9, 2022
Inspired by an article on a surplus of eggs, Kaede Kayano comes up with a plan to assassinate Koro-sensei by constructing a giant caramel pudding containing a hidden bomb, with all the students banding together to help make it. While Koro-sensei inevitably sees through the plan and disables the bomb, he shares the remaining caramel pudding with his students. Later, the students participate in a game of Cops and Robbers, in which they must use parkour to avoid being captured by Karasuma, but the captives manage to use bribes to have Koro-sensei let them escape. The next day, the students accuse Koro-sensei of stealing underwear from all over the city, but they later suspect that he is being framed by someone. They soon discover the true culprit to be one of Karasuma's underlings, who had been used by Shiro to lure Koro-sensei into a trap, a cage made from fibers that can hurt him. Shiro once again pit Koro-sensei against Itona Horibe.
25	3	"Itona Horibe Time"; Transliteration: "Horibe Itona no Jikan" (Japanese: 堀部糸成の時間)	Rei Yabana	Tokuaki Saito Yoshito Jinshoji	January 21, 2016	January 16, 2022
Despite Itona's increased deadliness, Koro-sensei manages to evade his attacks and defeat him. Just then, Itona starts reeling from the effects of his tentacle implants, which he had been keeping under control due to Shiro's treatments. Shiro leaves after deeming no further use of Itona, who later goes on a rampage and starts destroying cell phone shops. As Koro-sensei tries to reason with Itona, Shiro attacks Koro-sensei and capture Itona. Shiro lures Koro-sensei into another trap, but the students arrive on the scene to rescue Koro-sensei and Itona, forcing Shiro to retreat. The students soon learn that Itona was allegedly abandoned by his parents after their electronics company went bankrupt. After Takuya Muramatsu, Taisei Yoshida and Kirara Hazama each fail to cheer up Itona, Ryōma Terasaka manages to calm down Itona, allowing Koro-sensei to safely remove the tentacle implants and enroll him as an official student of Class 3-E.
26	4	"Spinning Time"; Transliteration: "Tsumugu Jikan" (Japanese: 紡ぐ時間)	Kinome Yu	Kinome Yu	January 28, 2016	January 16, 2022
Itona creates a prototype of a remote-controlled tank, which he plans to strike at Koro-sensei's heart as being the weak point. The other boys in the class suggest a fisheye lens and a camouflage design for the tank, but it later gets destroyed by a weasel. The girls soon figure out that the boys potentially wanted to use the tank to spy on them. Later, Masayoshi (Justice) Kimura feels embarrassment over his written name, Justice. The students are assigned code names by Koro-sensei during a training session against Karasuma, leaving Kimura assigned with his true name to show how well it fits him. Kimura is inspired by Koro-sensei to accept his true name, not by how it is written, but by how one is associated by it.
27	5	"Leader Time"; Transliteration: "Rīdā no Jikan" (Japanese: リーダーの時間)	Yoshimichi Hirai	Yoshimichi Hirai	February 4, 2016	January 23, 2022
Yūma Isogai secretly works part-time as a waiter at a restaurant, but he is soon discovered by Class 3-A's Big Five (Gakushū Asano, Teppei Araki, Ren Sakakibara, Natsuhiko Koyama and Tomoya Seo). Gakushū threatens that he will report Isogai to expulsion unless Class 3-E can beat Class 3-A in the sports festival's pole-toppling event. This turns out to be an unfair exhibition match since Gakushū has his team filled with powerful American foreign exchange students led by a boy named Kevin. Despite this, Isogai manages to come up with some unconventional countermeasures for his teammates and their use of unique skills against Kevin's group, eventually outwitting Gakushū and taking the victory.
28	6	"Before & After Time"; Transliteration: "Bifō Afutā no Jikan" (Japanese: ビフォーアフターの時間)	Fumio Ito	Shinichi Masaki	February 11, 2016	January 30, 2022
While preparing for their midterm exams, the students of Class 3-E perform parkour outside of school grounds. However, Taiga Okajima and Kimura accidentally fall on Matsukata, an elderly principal of Wakaba Park Nursery School, who was on his way there by bike. As a result, Koro-sensei bans the students from studying for the midterms and has them volunteer at the nursery school until Matsukata recovers from his injured right femur. While the other students help entertain the naughty children and renovate the decrepit nursery school, Nagisa Shiota mentors a bullied girl named Sakura Kiyashiki, teaching her to find the strength to return to primary school. After two weeks, Matsukata returns to see the nursery school completely transformed into a safe and fun environment. With no time left to study, the students perform badly in the midterms, yet Karma Akabane scores second place overall due to studying during the summer. Having learned their lesson of being careful in using their newfound strength, the students receive new equipment for their future assassination efforts.
29	7	"Reaper Time, Part 1"; Transliteration: "Shinigami no Jikan Zenpen" (Japanese: 死神の時間 前編)	Noriyuki Noya	Tokuaki Saito Yoshito Jinshoji	February 18, 2016	February 6, 2022
The students of Class 3-E notice that Irina's birthday was a few days ago, so they go see a florist to arrange for Karasuma to give Irina a bouquet for the occasion. However, the mood is spoiled when Karasuma casts aside Irina's romantic interest for the good of the mission, leading her to storm off. After Irina stops showing up at school for a few days, the students are suddenly snuck up upon by the florist, revealing himself to be The Reaper, who tasks the students to rescue Irina from being bound and gagged inside a dungeon. The Reaper lures the students into his trap at a fortress, but they attempt to escape and find Irina. Some students are taken down by The Reaper one by one, and even Nagisa is thwarted by his clap stunner. Meanwhile, the remaining students manage to find Irina, but they discover that she has turned against them. As all of the students are recaptured, Koro-sensei and Karasuma begin their rescue attempt.
30	8	"Reaper Time, Part 2"; Transliteration: "Shinigami no Jikan Kōhen" (Japanese: 死神の時間 後編)	Nobu Ishida	Takehiko Matsumoto	February 25, 2016	February 13, 2022
When Koro-sensei and Karasuma reach the fortress, The Reaper reveals that he has placed neck braces as explosives on the students. The Reaper manages to lock Koro-sensei with the students, planning to kill them all in a canal flood. Choosing to protect his students, Karasuma chases after The Reaper, who sets off an explosion that traps Irina under some rubble. Hinano Kurahashi encourages Karasuma to rescue Irina, who was taken in by Lovro after her parents were killed in a civil war when she was a child. The students manage to remove the neck braces in time and camouflage from being seen in the live camera feed. Karasuma gets the drop on The Reaper and confronts him in close quarters combat. After being shot by The Reaper with a hidden gun in his index finger, Karasuma is saved by one of Koro-sensei's tentacles, allowing Karasuma to deliver the knockout blow. Afterwards, the students convince Irina to return as their teacher, while Karasuma gets the government to ensure that the students will remain safe from other assassins pursuing the bounty.
31	9	"Round Two Time"; Transliteration: "Ni-Shū-me no Jikan" (Japanese: 2周目の時間)	Ken Ando	Noriaki Saito	March 3, 2016	February 20, 2022
As the students of Class 3-E are in the process of deciding on their future careers, Nagisa believes that he should become a professional assassin, but Koro-sensei tells him to give it some more thought. Nagisa comes home to his mother Hiromi Shiota, who urges Nagisa to move out of Class 3-E due to his poor grades and becomes hostile when Nagisa insists on staying in Class 3-E. On the next day, Koro-sensei agrees on Nagisa's behalf to impersonate Karasuma for a parent-teacher meeting with Hiromi, stating to her that Nagisa will not be allowed to leave Class 3-E unless solely desired. Unwilling to take no for an answer, Hiromi later drugs Nagisa when he eats dinner and drives him to the old campus. She tries to have him commit arson to the old campus in order to sever his connections with Class 3-E. However, they are interrupted by a whip-wielding hitman who is targeting Koro-sensei. Nagisa uses his assassination skills to take down the hitman and protect his mother. Choosing to pursue a different career, Nagisa decides to work hard to support Hiromi, who lets him stay in Class 3-E.
32	10	"School Festival Time"; Transliteration: "Gakuen-sai no Jikan" (Japanese: 学園祭の時間)	Itoga Shintaro	Hiroshi Kugimiya	March 10, 2016	February 27, 2022
A school festival is held, and all the classes compete to make the most money in their dining stalls. The students of Class 3-E take advantage of their mountain location by using local ingredients to create dishes that prove a hit for customers of many familiar faces. Meanwhile, Gakushū and rest of the Big Five use music industry business sponsors to draw in customers. When Yūji Norita comes by for a visit, Rio Nakamura dresses up Nagisa like a girl. During their "date", Nagisa eventually reveals his true gender to Yūji. Impressed by Nagisa's honesty, Yūji posts about the dining stall on his food blog, causing an influx of customers on the next day. Koro-sensei advises his students to close their dining stall early to avoid disrupting the mountain's ecosystem with excessive foraging. Hiromi arrives to patch things up with Nagisa. In spite of closing early, Class 3-E comes in third place, just behind Class 3-A and high school.
33	11	"End-of-Term Time, 2nd Period"; Transliteration: "Kimatsu no Jikan Ni-Jikan-me" (Japanese: 期末の時間 2時間目)	Kinome Yu	Kinome Yu	March 17, 2016	March 6, 2022
With final exams approaching, Gakushū witnesses as Gakuhō Asano uses brainwashing tactics on Class 3-A to fuel their hatred towards Class 3-E. As Koro-sensei tasks the students of Class 3-E to make it into the top fifty, it is revealed that Gakuhō will be taking over the lessons for Class 3-A with his twisted educational methodology. Gakushū asks the students of Class 3-E to beat Gakuhō at his own academic game, but the students of Class 3-E already strive to do their best, perhaps better than Class 3-A. During the final exams, the students are faced with college-level questions added by Gakuhō, but the students of Class 3-E manage to get through them using techniques taught not only by Koro-sensei, but also each other.
34	12	"Think Outside the Box Time"; Transliteration: "Kūkan no Jikan" (Japanese: 空間の時間)	Yoshimichi Hirai	Daisei Fukuoka	March 24, 2016	March 13, 2022
The final exams climax with a showdown between Karma and Gakushū as they tackle the last math problem, solving the volume of an atom inside a cube of a domain. Gakushū struggles to come up with complex formulae after reading the last half of the problem, but Karma discovers a simple formula after reading the first part of the problem. Following the final exams, Koro-sensei reveals that all of his students manage to land in the top fifty. After Gakushū and the rest of Class 3-A state their preference to the ideals of Class 3-E, Gakuhō takes matters into his own hands, threatening to destroy the old campus and sack Koro-sensei. In order to save the class and his job, Koro-sensei is tasked with solving five workbooks containing grenades that could hurt him, with one of those workbooks containing a real grenade.
35	13	"Let Live Time"; Transliteration: "Ikasu Jikan" (Japanese: 生かす時間)	Takashi Okawara	Noriaki Saito	March 31, 2016	March 20, 2022
Despite getting hit by the math workbook, Koro-sensei manages to finish other subject workbooks without setting them off, having memorized all the problems beforehand. Left with the final workbook containing the real grenade, Gakuhō recalls his time as a kindhearted elementary teacher at a private cram school for his students Rikuto Ikeda, Mori and Nakai. Three years after these students moved onto junior high school, Gakuhō was shocked to discover that Ikeda committed suicide as a result of bullying. This led Gakuhō to change his teaching approach from kindhearted to ruthless. In the present, Koro-sensei protects Gakuhō from the real grenade, revealing that he bases his teaching methods in Class 3-E on Gakuhō's old stance on education. Gakuhō reflects on this, allowing Class 3-E to continue and aiming to become a better educator and parent. Afterwards, Class 3-E puts on a unique play about Momotaro for the drama festival.
36	14	"Secret Identity Time"; Transliteration: "Shōtai no Jikan" (Japanese: 正体の時間)	Atsuko Tonomizu	Shinichi Tokaibayashi	April 7, 2016	March 27, 2022
Koro-sensei, Nagisa, and Kaede help to tidy up the storage shed, reminiscing over the past year together. Just then, Kaede suddenly attacks Koro-sensei with tentacles of her own, revealing her true identity to be Akari Yukimura, the younger sister of the previous teacher of Class 3-E, Aguri Yukimura. Believing Koro-sensei to be responsible for her sister's death, Kaede stole some tentacle serum from her sister's lab and arranged to join Class 3-E in order to exact her revenge, withstanding the pain of the tentacles while waiting for the right moment to strike. Kaede later puts her own life at risk to battle against Koro-sensei in a field of zebra grass, this time with the full strength of her flaming tentacles. Koro-sensei hears her inner voice, wishing to be saved.
37	15 (Note: Change title to "Assassination Classroom: FINAL Season".)	"Confession Time"; Transliteration: "Kokuhaku no Jikan" (Japanese: 告白の時間)	Fumio Maezono	Shinichi Masaki	April 21, 2016 (Note: The April 14, 2016 television broadcast of episode 15 was delayed by a week due to news coverage of an earthquake in the Kumamoto Prefecture.)	April 3, 2022
Determined to save Kaede before the tentacles kill her, Koro-sensei asks his students to think of a way to make Kaede forget her bloodlust while he lets her attack his weak point. Nagisa decides to use what he learned from Irina and delivers a powerful French kiss to Kaede, shocking her long enough to allow Koro-sensei to safely remove her tentacles. Shiro, who suddenly appears with The Reaper, reveals his identity to be Kōtarō Yanagisawa, a face that Koro-sensei is all too familiar with. After Kaede recovers, Koro-sensei proceeds to tell the truth about his past, unveiling that he was The Original Reaper. Two years ago, The Reaper was captured by Yanagisawa and brought to a lab, where he met Aguri. As The Reaper underwent experimentation with Yanagisawa's tentacle formula, he became well acquainted with Aguri, revealing that he was captured after being betrayed by a pupil who would go on to become The Second Reaper.
38	16	"Past Time"; Transliteration: "Kako no Jikan" (Japanese: 過去の時間)	Fumio Ito	Noriaki Saito	April 28, 2016	April 10, 2022
Over the course of a year, The Reaper's body continued to be altered by the experiment while his relationship with Aguri continued to grow stronger. Meanwhile, an experiment testing the effects of the tentacle formula on a rat proved disastrous, causing the explosion that destroyed seventy percent of the moon. Learning that the same thing may happen to him in a year's time, The Reaper unleashed his new powers in an attempt to escape from Yanagisawa's facility killing several guards and gouging out Yanagisawa's left eye. As Aguri tried to keep him from leaving, she was fatally wounded by one of the facility's traps, asking him to watch over Class 3-E in her place. Devastated by Aguri's death, The Reaper wished to be weak and flawed, and his tentacles transformed him into the kindhearted teacher Koro-sensei. Back in the present, as the students are troubled over the thought of having to assassinate the teacher they had grown to admire (with Kaede having a change of heart after learning the truth), Nagisa states his desire to find a way to save Koro-sensei's life.
39	17	"Discord Time"; Transliteration: "Bunretsu no Jikan" (Japanese: 分裂の時間)	Takashi Okawara	Tomohisa Taguchi	May 5, 2016	April 17, 2022
Kurahashi is the first among some students to agree with Nagisa's wish to save Koro-sensei, but Nakamura is the first among other students to speak out against it. After Karma expresses that Nagisa is being arrogant and selfish, Karma grabs onto Nagisa's tie, but Nagisa does a triangle choke on Karma before Koro-sensei arrives to mediate the situation. The students are divided into two opposing teams in a paintball match to determine whether to kill or save Koro-sensei, with victory being decided by either total elimination or flag capture. As the match begins, Karma's talent for formulating combat strategy gives the red "kill" team an early advantage over the blue "don't kill" team. However, Karma is uneasy upon realizing that Nagisa has been seemingly absent throughout the battle. Nakamura, Terasaka, Muramatsu and Yoshida of the red team approach the flag of the decimated blue team, only to be suddenly eliminated by Nagisa alone in an instant.
40	18	"Outcome Time"; Transliteration: "Kekka no Jikan" (Japanese: 結果の時間)	Takahiro Majima	Shinichi Tokaibayashi	May 12, 2016	April 24, 2022
With only the two of them remaining, Karma challenges Nagisa to fight him in a melee duel. Nagisa and Karma each reminisce about their past friendship during their first year at junior high school, but they slowly began to drift apart due to Karma's violent behavior and Nagisa's hidden aura. During the duel, both of them lose their knives, and Karma does an axe kick on Nagisa to take him down. However, Nagisa rises up to execute his clap stunner, yet Karma bites his tongue to withstand its effect. Nagisa manages to catch Karma in a triangle choke, leading Karma to admit defeat and declaring the blue team victorious. Later on, Class 3-E prepares to sneak aboard a rocket bound for the International Space Station in order to obtain data on how to save Koro-sensei.
41	19	"Outer Space Time"; Transliteration: "Uchū no Jikan" (Japanese: 宇宙の時間)	Itoga Shintaro	Shinichi Tokaibayashi	May 19, 2016	May 1, 2022
After training for their mission, Nagisa and Karma are chosen as the two pilots to be sent into space. Thanks to Ritsu infiltrating the security mainframe of the space center, Nagisa and Karma manage to sneak aboard the rocket in place of some crash test dummies as it lifts off into space. Arriving at the International Space Station, the pair manage to convince the astronaut crew members to share their data before returning safely to Earth. Upon inspecting the data, Manami Okuda tells the other students that the chance of Koro-sensei actually exploding is less than one percent with the help of a drug. Nonetheless, the students agree to continue their assassination attempts until graduation.
42	20	"Valentine's Day Time"; Transliteration: "Barentain no Jikan" (Japanese: バレンタインの時間)	Akira Shimizu	Shinichi Tokaibayashi	May 26, 2016	May 8, 2022
As the students prepare for their entrance exams, Nagisa is led to consider becoming a teacher when having a conversation with Sakura during their tutoring session. Meanwhile, Karma and Nakamura notice that Kaede hesitates to give Nagisa a box of chocolates for Valentine's Day, so they show her how the other female students take on this approach to the other male students. However, when Kaede works up the courage to do so, she is ultimately unable to confess her feelings for him. Elsewhere, Karasuma and Irina have a date together, discussing the likelihood that Koro-sensei will not stop being targeted simply because of his reduced chance of exploding. Also, Gakuhō offers Koro-sensei to continue teaching the class during the next term, but Koro-sensei considers resignation instead. Karasuma suggests Irina to work for the government due to her expertise, and he hints that she should move in with him.
43	21	"Trust Time"; Transliteration: "Shinrai no Jikan" (Japanese: 信頼の時間)	Nobu Ishida	Noriaki Saito	June 2, 2016	May 15, 2022
Koro-sensei decides to compile a yearbook specifically for the students of Class 3-E, though the students are not particularly enthusiastic with the candid photos he has taken over the year. After another tutoring session with Sakura, Nagisa tells Koro-sensei that he wants to become a teacher during his final career counseling session. That night, the government begins executing their plan to assassinate Koro-sensei, trapping him in an inescapable laser barrier as they prepare to fire an orbital laser cannon in a week. With the media claiming that the students were being held hostage, Nagisa and the others spend the next few days devising a plan to reach the classroom and save Koro-sensei.
44	22	"Happy Birthday Time"; Transliteration: "Happī Bāsudei no Jikan" (Japanese: ハッピーバースデイの時間)	Yoshimichi Hirai	Goichi Iwahata	June 9, 2016	May 22, 2022
With three hours remaining until the orbital laser cannon is charged, Nagisa and the others begin infiltrating the mountain. Using their home turf to their advantage, the students knock out all the police troops guarding the area and reach Koro-sensei, who praises their efforts for coming so far despite the odds. He calmly shares words of wisdom to his students, preparing them for the road ahead. Just as Nakamura bring out a cake and all the students celebrate Koro-sensei's birthday, Yanagisawa appears on the scene with The Reaper, who has been powered up with tentacles. Koro-sensei looks back to when The Reaper used to be his apprentice, but he never gave The Reaper his approval as an assassin. While The Reaper battles Koro-sensei, Yanagisawa injects himself with the tentacle formula and attacks Koro-sensei as well.
45	23	"Final Boss Time"; Transliteration: "Rasubosu no Jikan" (Japanese: ラスボスの時間)	Fumio Ito	Shinichi Tokaibayashi	June 16, 2016	May 29, 2022
After struggling against both Yanagisawa and The Reaper, Koro-sensei takes further damage when Yanagisawa directs The Reaper to attack the students. Yanagisawa claims the students to be hindrances, but Koro-sensei defends his students, saying that they are his greatest gift as a teacher. Kaede attacks the Reaper, but is fatally injured in the process, seemingly sending Koro-sensei into a rage. However, his true expression turns out to be a mix of all of his emotions and sends a large energy blast blinding The Reaper and sending Yanagisawa flying into the laser barrier killing him. Koro-sensei then fatally stabs the Reaper, who had wanted to be acknowledged by his teacher all along. Afterwards, Koro-sensei, having managed to keep Kaede's blood safe during the battle, uses his skills to heal her injury and bring her back to life.
46	24	"Graduation Time"; Transliteration: "Sotsugyō no Jikan" (Japanese: 卒業の時間)	Yoshito Nishoji	Noriaki Saito	June 23, 2016	June 5, 2022
With Koro-sensei left weak from his battle against Yanagisawa and The Reaper, the students reluctantly but unanimously decide to kill him themselves. Held down by his beloved students, Koro-sensei says his farewell to Karasuma and Irina. Koro-sensei takes one final roll call, as he reminisces his great experience as a teacher. Although Nagisa shakes with his knife in hand, Koro-sensei calms him down, allowing Nagisa to deal the killing blow to the heart as Koro-sensei's body turns into light and the students then mourn. Afterwards, the students check their classroom to find their diplomas, graduation albums and personalized guidebooks left behind by Koro-sensei.
47	25	"Future Time"; Transliteration: "Mirai no Jikan" (Japanese: 未来の時間)	Takashi Okawara	Noriaki Saito Akito Yoshihide Yuuzumi	June 30, 2016	June 12, 2022
With Karasuma's help, the students of Class 3-E attend the junior high school graduation ceremony, where Nagisa learns that Koro-sensei had helped his parents get back together. When the mass media shows up to try and interview the students of Class 3-E about the assassination, Gakushu and the rest of the Big Five help them leave safely. As time passes and the Class 3-E system is abolished, the students receive their reward money, setting aside some for living and education expenses, donating to the nursery school, purchasing the rights to the old campus and giving back to the government. Seven years later, several students get together to tidy up the old campus and discuss what everyone has been up to over the years. Meanwhile, Nagisa begins working as a trainee teacher at a municipal high school, using the skills he had learned from Koro-sensei to set his delinquent class straight.

== Home media release ==
=== Japanese ===
Avex Pictures has released the series on Blu-ray and DVD, in a limited edition, in Japan from March 27, 2015, to October 28, 2016.

Avex Pictures (Japan, Blu-ray & DVD)
Volume		Episodes	Release date	Ref.
Season 2	1	1–3	March 25, 2016	
Season 2	2	4–6	April 29, 2016	
Season 2	3	7–9	May 27, 2016	
Season 2	4	10–12	June 24, 2016	
Season 2	5	13–15	July 29, 2016	
Season 2	6	16–18	August 26, 2016	
Season 2	7	19–21	September 30, 2016	
Season 2	8	22–25	October 28, 2016	

=== English ===
Funimation has released the series on Blu-ray and DVD in North America, in a regular and a limited edition, since May 17, 2016.

Funimation (North America, Blu-ray & DVD)
Volume		Episodes	Regular edition release date	Limited edition release date	Ref.
Season 2	1	1–13	February 21, 2017	–	
Season 2	2	14–25	June 27, 2017	–	
