= List of Sorcerous Stabber Orphen characters =

The following list is of characters from Sorcerous Stabber Orphen.

== Characters ==
=== Main characters ===
Orphen (オーフェン, Ōfen)
Voiced by: Showtaro Morikubo (1998, 2020 anime) (Japanese); David Matranga (1998, 2020 anime) (English)
Orphen is the main protagonist of the Sorcerous Stabber Orphen series and the title character, is known for his arrogance, gruff demeanor, short temper, and near-obsessive drive to finish what he is working on as soon as possible without distraction. He also strives to remain stoic and detached from others save his closest friends and allies. However, he has a strong sense of humanity and even though he will often complain, he will not abandon a person in need nor tolerate the slaughter of innocent. He is an anti-hero throughout the entire series. In the anime, the only time his attitude changes is when the subject of Azalie is brought up. He will do anything for Azalie, as they have quite a history together, but Orphen keeps his feelings and the story about Azalie to himself at first, only opening up later in the series. However, in the novels, he opens up about Azalie fairly quickly. He later becomes acerbic and callous towards her after she murders Childman and attempts to manipulate him on multiple occasions for her own ends. He, Leticia and Azalie were brought to the school together by Wall Karen because it was believed that they possessed a strong amount of magical power within them. This proved correct; Orphen was a magic prodigy. Orphen eventually becomes the greatest sorcerer in the world. His true name is Krylancelo Finrandi (キリランシェロ・フィンランディ, Kiriranshero Finrandi), and the sorcerers from the Tower of Fang (Heartia, Azalie, Leticia, Comicron, Forte, Korgon and Childman) still refer to him as such. In the novels, Orphen is characterized slightly differently, being more rough, profane and seemingly unstable than his anime portrayal. He suffers from increasing megalomania and what seems to be a type of dissociative identity disorder in which he sometimes thinks of Krylancelo and Orphen as two different individuals. However, through the company of his apprentice, Majic and the heiress Claiomh Everlasting, he steadily becomes more at peace with himself and learns to accept who he is. As a child, Orphen was trained to be a Stabber, which is a sorcerer trained in the art of eliminating other sorcerers with secret assassination techniques and deadly spells beyond conventional knowledge, though he actively resents his training since he despises killing. In the novels, he eventually gains the power and knowledge of the Demon King Swedenborge and temporarily attains the Dark Magic of the Fenrir by merging his mind with Leki's, though both of these magicks can tax on his sanity and health when he utilizes them. By the end of the original novella series, Orphen left the continent of Kiesalhima along with Claiomh Everlasting to settle down on the Hara continent. They later marry and have their daughters, Ratsbane, Edge and Ratchet. By the age of 43, he becomes the head founder of his own magic academy known the Swedenborge School of Sorcery.
Claiomh Everlasting (クリーオウ・エバーラスティン, Kurīou Ebārasutin)
Voiced by: Mayumi Iizuka (1998 anime), Rumi Ōkubo (2020 anime) (Japanese); Shelley Calene-Black (1998 anime), Sarah Wiedenheft (2020 anime) (English)
Claiomh Everlasting (Cleao in the 1998 anime), is a beautiful young girl that joins Orphen on his journey. In the first anime, she carries the Sword of Baltanders, which was entrusted to her by her father on her fifteenth birthday, and lets Orphen hold onto it as long as he does not object to her tagging along. Claiomh also carries in her backpack a Deep Dragon wolf-cub named Leki. She and Orphen constantly quarrel, but she does so to hide her growing affection for him and secretly longs for him from afar. She and Orphen eventually marry at the end of the original novels and have three daughters. She trains with a long sword and quickly becomes proficient with it as she journeys with Orphen and Majic, even able to duel on even grounds with other highly skilled swordsmen. It is later discovered that Claiomh has magical potential, which is unlocked due to Leki merging his mind with hers and she eventually seeks training from Leticia to develop her latent abilities, which she completed in a year's time. She also becomes skilled in using firearms thanks to her training at the Tower of Fang.
Majic Lin (マジク・リン, Majiku Rin)
Voiced by: Omi Minami (1998 anime), Yūsuke Kobayashi (2020 anime) (Japanese); Spike Spencer (1998 anime), Ry McKeand (2020 anime) (English)
Majic is Orphen's apprentice, and the secondary male lead. He is a childhood friend of Claiomh's, despite being three years apart in age, and they attended the same classroom in school before she left for boarding school. In the anime, they were in the same grade in school, but she has since moved on to boarding school. Majic deals with the torment brought about from both Claiomh and Orphen's action on their journey together. His father is paying Orphen to teach him, which at first seems a waste of money to his father. When Orphen repairs a glass that fell with his magic before the father's eyes, the father's opinion about his money being "thrown out the window" disappears. Majic appears to be a good student, learning as much as he can, and retaining all of what he learns, although his anxiety tends to get the better of him when it comes time to prove himself. Orphen, however, sees significant potential in Majic and encourages him in his training. This gives him courage, which makes his power stronger. Majic looks up to Orphen, and refers to him as "master" upon Orphen's request. All sorcerers call their "teachers", who teach them sorcery, "master." It is later revealed in the novels that Majic is a vampire, a rare mutagenic trait within humans which he inherited from his mother, Iris Lin, who is a sorceress/assassin said to rival Childman in terms of power and skill. Due to his vampire blood, his magical potential far exceeds Orphen's. By the end of the novels, Majic has become a famous, world-renowned sorcerer and even takes on Ratsbane, Orphen and Cleao's firstborn child, as his apprentice.
Leki (レキ, Reki)
Voiced by: Konami Yoshida (1998 anime) (Japanese); Suzanne Wilkins (1998 anime) (English)
One of the race of Deep Dragon (changed to Wolfen in the original English Dub), Leki is a cub who is found and adopted by Claiomh, although it is indicated by his mother that Leki adopted Claiomh, as adult Deep Dragons are more powerful and intelligent by far than humans. Like all Deep Dragons, Leki resembles a wolf rather than a reptilian dragon, and when he uses his innate magic, his eyes will glow a bright green color. As Leki is still very young, he often exhibits young animal-like tendencies, such as chasing after a butterfly. Yet in spite of his animalistic behavior, he is very intelligent and perceptive and has instinctual grasp of Dark Magic. He protects and defends Claiomh whenever he feels the need to, or when Claiomh orders him. He is also unique among his clan since he is able to retain his individuality, partially because of his empathetic connection to Claiomh. Leki will not only protect Claiomh, but anyone who he sees in danger. In the first anime, Leki's collar belongs to one of the three artifacts from the Aisle of Baltanders, the Bracelet of Nomafrozis. In the novel, Leki is eventually able to use telepathy to speak with his human companions and released Claiomh's hidden magical potential by linking with her mind. Throughout the novel series, Leki grows from a small cub to the size of a large dog. When exerting his full power, he will temporarily increase his size to that of an adult Deep Dragon.
Volkan (ボルカン, Borukan)
Voiced by: Kazue Ikura (1998 anime), Marie Mizuno (2020 anime) (Japanese); John Swasey (1998 anime), Brittney Karbowski (2020 anime) (English)
Vulcano Volkan is one of the two dwarven brothers who follow along with Orphen on his quest. He frequently refers to himself the "Masmaturian Bulldog". Volkan always comes up with their plans (which usually turn out to be poorly thought out, utterly bad ideas, and almost never work). He is known to be extremely egotistical, delusional and idiotic. He hates Orphen (whom he refers to as "the black wizard") and his companions, and always finds a way to ruin whatever they had in mind. He was banished from his home of Masmaturia because of his unapologetic troublemaking, and kidnapped his younger brother, to forcibly accompany him in his exile. It is his fault that Orphen often must use his magic to assault them (himself and Dortin) due to the fact that Volkan owes Orphen an exorbitant amount of money and he refuses to pay Orphen back his debt. Volkan wants only power and money, and any scheme he has in mind has the goal of getting him one of the two. None of his schemes ever work, however, due his short-sightedness and stupidity. He constantly bosses Dortin around in a very comical fashion. In spite of his ineptitude, he is surprisingly durable as sharp objects such as swords and scythes cannot break his skin and Orphen's magic, no matter how powerful, does not cause him any significant damage. This is largely due to his dwarven physiology. His ego is strong enough to suppress a White Mage within his mind and utilize her sorcery.
Dortin (ドーチン, Dōchin)
Voiced by: Hekiru Shiina (1998 anime), Mai Fuchigami (2020 anime) (Japanese); Hilary Haag (1998 anime), Apphia Yu (2020 anime) (English)
Volkan's younger brother. Dortin and Volkan are often viewed as comic relief throughout the series. They are two dwarves who are always low on money, and seem to always find a way to mess up whatever Orphen is trying to accomplish. In the first anime, they worked in Cleao's basement, working as cooks to both pay of their debt to Orphen as well as act as his spies. In the novels, they were forced to work for Claiomh as bodyguards as compensation for breaking them out of jail when they attempted con her older sister, Mariabelle, into a marriage scam. regards to his character, Dortin is the voice of reason (who is often ignored) on his and Volkan's quests. He is kind and knowledgeable, but his swirling glasses give him a rather geekish appearance. When Volkan messes up, Dortin always tries to tell Orphen he had no part in Volkan's schemes, but they both wind up being victims of Orphen's magical blasts anyway. In the anime and novels, Dortin is shown to be quite caring and loyal, as he begs Orphen for help in saving his brother from poisoning and, later in the anime, in defying Volkan's "order" to run from danger when a friend (Childman) needed his help. Dortin is surprisingly skilled at reading runes and has occasionally helped Orphen in deciphering texts by the Nornir. Like his brother, he is also highly resistant to both physical and magical damage due to his dwarven physiology.

=== Supporting characters ===
Azalie Cait Sith (アザリー・ケットシー, Azarī Kettoshī)
Voiced by: Emi Shinohara (1998 anime), Yoko Hikasa (2020 anime) (Japanese); Christine Auten (1998 anime), Lindsay Seidel (2020 anime) (English)
She's Orphen's foster sister, best friend, and the Bloody August. They were in the same orphanage and came to the Tower of Fang together, believed to be magical prodigies. She tutored him extensively, and gave him special attention. She was a great sorcerer - considered to be one of the greatest in her generation, and is referred to as the "Chaos Witch" by some at the Tower. She is a master of Black Magic and one of the few sorcerers that can harness White Magic. However, she had two sides to her. There was the kind, fun-loving and charismatic Azalie, and then the, as Orphen says, "scary" Azalie. After having her love declaration to her mentor rejected, she seemed to be almost obsessed with her studies; she wanted more power, and one of her experiments turned her into Bloody August - a name given to the demonic dragon that first appeared in August. In the novels, Azalie is returned to a human state fairly early in the series, but her mind has been warped by her time spent as the beast and the cruelties endured by those in the Tower who had been hunting her. Vengeful and partially insane, her main goal is to destroy the Tower and uncover Childman's true ambitions, which leads her to becoming a major antagonist in the series. She becomes increasingly unstable and Orphen is often torn between his attachment to her and his horror at her remorseless violence.
Childman Powderfield (チャイルドマン・パウダーフィールド, Chairudoman Paudāfīrudo)
Voiced by: Jouji Nakata (1998 anime), Daisuke Namikawa (2020 anime) (Japanese); Jason Douglas (1998 anime), J. Michael Tatum (2020 anime) (English)
Orphen, Heartia, and Azalie's Master and the most powerful sorcerer of the Kiesalhima Continent. In the novels, His original name was Alfredo Mines and was the disciple and son of Sister Istersiva, a Nornir priestess of the Three Sisters of Fate, as well as a diplomatic ambassador for both the Dragon and human race. He was later sent 200 years into the future by Sister Istersiva with a time spell. He later adopts the name "Childman Powderfield" as his primary identity and becomes an assassin, then eventually a teacher at the Tower of Fang. He is Orphen's primary antagonist for the better part of the original anime, as Orphen believes he really wants to kill Azalie. Heartia tries to convince Orphen that Childman isn't his enemy, but in the end, it fails. In actuality, he was trying to restore Azalie himself since he felt personally responsible for the tragedy that befell her. And at some point, things get even worse; when he tries to face the Bloody August, Azalie uses white magic to transfer her soul into his body, leaving Childman's soul trapped within the Bloody August. In the first manga adaptation, however, Orphen continues to secretly train under Childman after leaving the Tower, doing somewhat unsavory odd jobs for him that he does not wish to bring to the notice of the Tower. In the novels, he is killed by Azalie while inhabiting her mutated body, but not before revealing to Orphen that Azalie had transferred her soul to his body.
Heartia Arlenford (ハーティア, Hātia)
Voiced by: Ryotaro Okiayu (1998 anime), Taito Ban (2020 anime) (Japanese); Randy Sparks (1998 anime), Jessie James Grelle (2020 anime) (English)
Orphen's childhood friend and fellow sorcerer. They met at the Tower of Fang. He is on Childman's side, instead of Orphen's, however, making it seem as though Heartia is Orphen's enemy. However, Heartia truly cares about Orphen and considers him to be his best friend. He is also a fan of the (fictional) manga, Black Tiger, and assumes the guise of its main character and namesake on occasion. However, the manga is fairly obscure, so Dortin (Magic in the first anime) mistakenly assumes his name refers to the Penaeus monodon, a type of prawn sometimes called "Black Tiger", resulting in Heartia's receiving the nickname, "Shrimp Man", much to his own chagrin. In the novels, the Black Tiger costume that he dons is actually a magical garb created by the Nornir that was owned by the original (real) Black Tiger from over 150 years ago and retains his consciousness within the mask. Heartia's appearances are less prominent in the novel series, though his origins are similar. Heartia was also noted to be a notorious womanizer as he frequently dated multiple female sorcerers at the Tower of Fang, but his relationships typically last for only two weeks.
Leticia MacCredy (レティシャ・マクレディ, Retisha Makuredi)
Voiced by: Kotono Mitsuishi (1998 anime), Shizuka Itō (2020 anime) (Japanese); Alissa Alban (1998 anime), Mallorie Rodak (2020 anime) (English)
She is Orphen's other foster sister and childhood friend as well as one of his classmates at the Tower, though she is five years older than Orphen. She, Orphen and Azalie grew up together in an orphanage in Raindust before they were taken in by the Tower of Fangs. She has an intense rivalry with Azalie, in spite of the fact that they are cousins, and are often depicted as fighting in the novels. Leticia is considered to be the second most powerful sorcerer of Childman's students besides Azalie and has a fearsome reputation similar to her cousin's. Her most notable strength is the gift of vocal manipulation, which earned her the nickname "The Scream of Death" while in her studies at the Tower. Later, she is made the Inquisitor of the Tower of Fang and seems to hint at being in love with Orphen. Orphen shortens her name to Tish in most cases. She appears in volumes five and six of the manga, and is seen throughout nearly all of the original set of novels.
Forte Puckingham (フォルテ, Forute)
Voiced by: Tomoaki Maeno (2020 anime) (Japanese); Ian Sinclair (2020 anime) (English)
A member of the Childman Class. He is a powerful sorcerer who presides over a large information network. He was always known to be stern, serious and quite studious. Through his information network he ultimately learned of Azalie's survival and Childman's demise. He was set to be Majic's instructor in the Tower of Fangs.
Ed
Voiced by: Daisuke Ono (2020 anime)
Lottecia
Voiced by: Shiki Aoki (2020 anime)

=== Tower of Fangs ===
Comicron (コミクロン, Komikuron)
Voiced by: Rikuya Yasuda (2020 anime) (Japanese); Dallas Reid (2020 anime) (English)
A member of the Childman Class. He was known to have a penchant for weird inventions that often resulted in chaos (although it was revealed that Azalie tweaked some of them without his knowledge). While he lacked in offensive power, he was the best healer of the class and was secretly in love with Leticia. He was burned to cinders during the expedition to hunt Azalie in her Dragon form.
Uoar Curlaine
Voiced by: Kenjiro Tsuda (2020 anime) (Japanese); R. Bruce Elliott (2020 anime) (English)
The instructor of the Uoar Class who specializes on Stabbing, the art of Sorcerer assassination. He is a rival to Childman who secretly plots to overthrow the latter's class, viewing them as a threat to his ambitions to seize control of the Tower of Fangs. For a time he trained Orphen, then Krylancelo in assassination techniques. He tried to obtain the World Transcript, a book rumored to be written by the God, Swedenborge and said to contain magic secrets which he believed was the source of Childman's power and influence in the Tower. For that purpose he had his class attack the alumni of the Childman Class taking advantage of Childman's absence. He ultimately fails when Orphen, Forte and Azalie corner him with Orphen nearly killing him. Azalie proceeds to wipe out his class' memories of her and he and his class are arrested by Forte.
Hydrant
Voiced by: Hiroyuki Yoshino (2020 anime) (Japanese); Daman Mills (2020 anime) (English)
A member of Uoar's Class and a Stabber whose real name is Miram Toram. Five years ago, he got the left half of his face scarred by Krylancelo in a fit when Hydrant provoked Krylancelo with the revelation that he was trained in order to kill Azalie should the need come. Ever since, he has held a grudge against Orphen and seeks to kill him committing multiple assassinations in the meantime. He is a powerful Stabber with more skill over Sorcery than Orphen, but is weaker in martial arts which Orphen exploits to defeat him. He was nearly killed by Orphen, but was prevented from doing so when Claiomh interrupted their fight. He was eventually arrested along the rest of the Uoar Class.
Swain
Voiced by: Nobuhiko Okamoto (2020 anime) (Japanese); Josh Bangle (2020 anime) (English)
A member of Uoar's Class and a Stabber. He was sent along with Hydrant to retrieve the World Transcript from the Childman Class by orders of Uoar in order to seize its power and take control over the Tower of Fangs. For that purpose he teamed with Hydrant and attacked Tish and Orphen, almost killing the former when ambushing her. He had a brief encounter with Majic for ownership of the desired book (in truth a fake), and was heavily injured by Forte. He is arrested along the rest of the Uoar class.

=== Kimluck Church ===
Mädchen Amick
Voiced by: Akari Kitō (2020 anime)
Salua
Voiced by: Yoshiyuki Shimozuma (2020 anime)
Quo
Voiced by: Tomokazu Sugita (2020 anime)
Carlotta
Voiced by: Maaya Sakamoto (2020 anime)
Name
Voiced by: Takehito Koyasu (2020 anime)
Pope Ramonirok
Voiced by: Atsushi Miyauchi (2020 anime)
Lapointe
Voiced by: Katsuyuki Konishi (2020 anime)
Anastasia
Voiced by: Emi Hirayama (2020 anime)

=== Kiesalhima ===
Almagest
Voiced by: Akira Ishida (2020 anime)
Damian
Voiced by: Taiten Kusunoki (2020 anime)
Winona
Voiced by: Aina Aiba (2020 anime)

=== Thirteen Apostles ===
Pluto
Voiced by: Satoshi Hino (2020 anime)
Maria
Voiced by: Rena Maeda (2020 anime)
Isabella
Voiced by: Haruka Fushimi (2020 anime)
Irgitte
Voiced by: Yuna Kamakura (2020 anime)
Kakorkist
Voiced by: Shimba Tsuchiya (2020 anime)
Seek
Voiced by: Takuya Nakashima (2020 anime)

=== XX ===
Ryan
Voiced by: Junya Enoki (2020 anime)
Halpert
Voiced by: Takuya Eguchi (2020 anime)
Jack
Voiced by: Hiroki Yasumoto (2020 anime)

=== Other characters ===
Sister Istersiva
Voiced by: Kikuko Inoue (2020 anime)
Eris
Voiced by: Kana Hanazawa (2020 anime)
Shiina
Voiced by: Mariya Ise (2020 anime)
