= Fucked by My Best Friend =

Romantic comedy manga series

- Cover for the original release, featuring Shion (left) and Rui

黒ギャルになったから親友とヤってみた。 (Kuro-Gyaru ni Natta Kara Shinyū to Yatte Mita.)
- Genre: Romantic comedy, boys' love
- Manga
- Written by: Yupopo Orishima
- Published by: Screamo (digitally); Suiseisha (print)
- English publisher: Coolmic
- Imprint: Zettai Ryōiki R! (digitally); Glanz BL Comics (print)
- Original run: October 4, 2019 – August 2, 2024
- Volumes: 4
- Anime television series

Kuro-Gyaru ni Natta Kara Shinyū to Shite Mita
- Directed by: Chokkō
- Written by: Rei Ishikura; Eeyo Kurosaki
- Studio: Irawiazu
- Original network: Tokyo MX, BS11
- Original run: April 5, 2021 – May 24, 2021
- Episodes: 8

Fucked by My Best Friend, known in Japan as Kuro-Gyaru ni Natta Kara Shinyū to Yatte Mita. (Japanese: 黒ギャルになったから親友とヤってみた。; "I Became a Kuro-Gyaru, So I Fucked My Best Friend." (Note: Within the first Japanese collected edition, the title is also given in English, with kuro-gyaru – a term for a fashion trend combining a dark tan with the gyaru sub-culture – translated as "black gal"; Anime News Network described this translation choice as overly literal.)), is a romantic comedy manga series created by Yupopo Orishima. It was serialized in Japanese by Screamo from October 4, 2019 until August 2, 2024, and is published in English by Coolmic; it is also released in collected tankōbon volumes in Japanese by Suiseisha.

The series follows two womanizing playboys, one of whom is drugged to be taught a lesson, which transforms his body to look like a woman's; following this, his friend falls in love with him. An anime television series adaptation directed by Chokkō at Irawiazu premiered on April 5 to May 24, 2021.

== Synopsis ==
Fucked by My Best Friend is a bisexual romantic comedy manga, which follows Shion Chihara and Rui Chihaya, two close friends and pickup artists. To teach him a lesson about his womanizing ways, a woman drugs Shion, which alters his body to look like a woman's. Rui does at first not recognize Shion, and falls in love with him at first sight.

== Characters ==
- Shion Chihara (千原獅音, Chihara Shion), a womanizing playboy, and a close friend of Rui's. After being drugged, his body changes to look like a woman's. In the anime television series, he is voiced by Kazutomi Yamamoto, both in his male and female forms.
- Rui Chihaya (千早瑠依, Chihaya Rui), a womanizing playboy, and a close friend of Shion's. In the anime television series, he is voiced by Makoto Furukawa.
- Hajime Tsuzuki (綴喜創, Tsuzuki Hajime), a doctor knowledgeable on the human body, and an acquaintance of Rui's. In the anime television series, he is voiced by Yoshiyuki Shimozuma.
- Mayu Uehara (宇栄原真由, Uehara Mayu), a beauty contest winner who is attracted to Rui. In the anime television series, she is voiced by Marin Mizutani.

== Production and release ==
Fucked by My Best Friend is written and drawn by Yupopo Orishima, and is released digitally by Screamo under their imprint Zettai Ryōiki R! from October 4, 2019 until August 2, 2024. It was also been released in print in 4 collected tankōbon volumes by Suiseisha under their Glanz BL Comics imprint since July 18, 2020. An English translation is published digitally by Coolmic through their website.

=== Volumes ===
| No. | Release date | ISBN |
|---|---|---|
| 1 | July 18, 2020 | 978-4434274329 |
| 2 | April 18, 2021 | 978-4434284526 |
| 3 | July 18, 2023 | 978-4434319570 |
| 4 | October 18, 2024 | 978-4434319570 |

== Anime ==
The animation studio Irawiazu is adapting the manga into an eight-episode series of anime shorts under the title Kuro-Gyaru ni Natta Kara Shinyū to Shite Mita (黒ギャルになったから親友としてみた。). It is directed by Chokkō, with a script by Rei Ishikura and Eeyo Kurosaki, and art direction by Namiko Hanayashiki and Tamako Noyama. McQ1 designed the characters, and is also chief animation director for the project.

The series aired from April 5 to May 24, 2021, (Note: The series is billed as premiering on April 4, 2021 at 25:00, which was effectively April 5 at 1:00 a.m. JST.) and is released in two versions: one "premium edition" featuring sex scenes, available through the ComicFesta anime streaming service, and one "on-air edition" without the sex scenes, airing on Japanese television on Tokyo MX and BS11; the first episode of the on-air edition was released for free ahead of the full release through YouTube and ComicFesta on February 11, 2021. The on-air version was released on July 28, 2021, on Anime Festa's original shop. The series was also launched dubbed in English under the title Seduced by My Best Friend, and was released by Ascendent Animation.

=== Episodes ===
| No. | Title | Directed by | Written by | Storyboarded by | Original release date |
|---|---|---|---|---|---|
| Special | "Special Program: Shallow Playboy and Gal First Appearance Video"; Transliteration: "Tokuban～Charao to Gyaru to Shoshutsu Shi Eizō" (Japanese: 特番～チャラ男とギャルと初出し映像) | N/A | N/A | N/A | March 29, 2021 |
| 1 | "Starting Today, You Are My Woman"; Transliteration: "Kyō Kara Omae, Ore no Onna ni Nare yo" (Japanese: 今日からお前、俺の女になれよ) | Ryū Motoyama | Eeyo Kurosaki | Chokkō | April 5, 2021 |
A woman drugs the womanizing playboy Shion to teach him a lesson, transforming his body to look like a woman's. His friend Rui, another playboy, does not recognize Shion, and falls in love with him at first sight. Shion initially pretends to be a woman as Rui kisses him, but Rui eventually recognizes Shion by his distinct scar; he does not mind, however, and the two have sex. Afterward, they agree to keep the transformation a secret, and to remain sexual partners.
| 2 | "We, Crossed Another Line"; Transliteration: "Warera, Mō Issen Koe Chimatten da yo" (Japanese: 俺ら、もう一線超えちまってんだよ) | Ryū Motoyama | Eeyo Kurosaki | Chokkō | April 12, 2021 |
| 3 | "What Are You Hiding. You're a Man, Right?"; Transliteration: "Nani Kakushiten da yo. Otoko Dōshi, Daro?" (Japanese: 何隠してんだよ。男同士、だろ？) | Toshihiro Watase | Eeyo Kurosaki | Toshihiro Watase | April 19, 2021 |
| 4 | "I've Always Liked, Men Like You"; Transliteration: "Mukashi Kara Suki da wa, Omae no Sō Iu Toko" (Japanese: 昔から好きだわ、お前のそーいうトコ) | Toshihiro Watase | Eeyo Kurosaki | Toshihiro Watase | April 26, 2021 |
| 5 | "If You're a Man You Can't Do It Right?"; Transliteration: "Otoko Dōshi Nara Nōkantte Koto Daro?" (Japanese: 男同士ならノーカンってことだろ？) | Toshihiro Watase | Eeyo Kurosaki | Toshihiro Watase | May 3, 2021 |
| 6 | "Don't Say That Even If You Lie"; Transliteration: "Uso de mo Sonna Koto Iun ja nē" (Japanese: 嘘でもそんなこと言うんじゃねぇ) | Toshihiro Watase | Eeyo Kurosaki | Toshihiro Watase | May 10, 2021 |
| 7 | "Your Feelings, I'll Prove Them"; Transliteration: "Omae no Kimochi, Shōmei Shite Yaru" (Japanese: お前の気持ち、証明してやる) | Ryū Motoyama | Eeyo Kurosaki | Chokkō | May 17, 2021 |
| 8 | "I'll Do It Till the End"; Transliteration: "Saigo Made Suru zo" (Japanese: 最後までするぞ) | Ryū Motoyama | Eeyo Kurosaki | Chokkō | May 24, 2021 |
