= List of Assassination Classroom characters =

This page lists the characters that appear in Assassination Classroom.

== Main characters ==
=== Koro-sensei ===
Voiced by: Jun Fukuyama (TV anime), Masaya Onosaka (vomic), Tomokazu Seki (event anime & J-Stars Victory VS), Kazunari Ninomiya (live-action) (Japanese); Sonny Strait (English)

Koro-sensei (殺せんせー, Koro-sensē) is the main protagonist and anti-villain of the series. He is a yellow octopus-like creature who is the teacher of Class 3-E of Kunugigaoka Junior High School. Koro-sensei is initially thought to be the perpetrator of the destruction of the Moon, which has rendered it permanently in a crescent shape; this is later revealed to be false, as the true culprit was a mouse implanted with his cells that had been sent to the moon as part of an experiment. Despite not having the intention to get killed, he offered to governments all over the world a chance to kill him under the condition that he is allowed to be the homeroom teacher of Class 3-E until the end of the year, when he will destroy the Earth by self-explosion unless he is killed. He is dedicated to his task as a teacher and imparting his knowledge of assassination to the students, despite knowing full well that he is their target. However, he is able to connect with each student individually, which is why all of his students respect him, despite knowing that he will destroy the planet in a year. His skin color changes depending on his mood, as well being able to move at a maximum speed of Mach 20 (24,500 km/h), which allows him to travel across the world in a short amount of time and makes him a hard target to hit. He is also intelligent to the point that he could teach almost every subject to all of his students single-handedly. He does however have a number of weaknesses, mainly to special rubber knives and BB pellets specifically designed to work against his body.

While he is initially believed to be an alien, he later reveals that he was once a legendary human assassin who was the original Reaper. After being betrayed by his apprentice (the Reaper seen throughout the series), he was captured and sent to a facility where a series of experiments were performed on him and transforms his body which causes him to mutate into an octopus. Koro-sensei was born in the slums of an unknown third world country, where he soon learned he had a natural talent for killing and never bothered using his empathy. He became an assassin, murdering anyone for the right price, even world leaders and the heads of entire militaries. However, after being captured and used as a guinea pig (although he can escape at any time, he chooses to stay to develop superpowers, subtly guiding the experiments so that he can profit from them), he begins to learn how to use compassion and empathy from a female intern with whom he becomes close. His decision to become a teacher involves his promise to the intern who thought that he was suitable to become one, later revealed to be Class 3-E's former teacher, Aguri Yukimura, who was selected to be his observer during the experiments performed on him and he had fallen in love with. After finding out Yanagisawa intended to dispose of him and he'll die in one year, he went on a rampage slaughtering nearly everyone in the facility except for Aguri and Yanagisawa (whom he blinded in one eye), having decided he didn't care about taking down the world with him. While he was stopped by Aguri, she was mortally wounded by one trap aimed at him, which lead him to become the teacher of class 3-E as it was Aguri's dying wish. According to Koro-sensei, his lifespan will be over by the end of the school year in March, and if he is not killed by then, the whole planet will perish with him due to the explosive release of the anti-matter in his body that was generated by the experiments performed on him. After a vicious clash with Kōtarō Yanagisawa, the scientist responsible for his current condition, and his former apprentice, the second Reaper, and using all of his energy left to save Kayano who was mortally injured during the confrontation, an exhausted Koro-sensei bids farewell to his students and finally allows them to kill him, with Nagisa ultimately doing so by stabbing him in the heart. After being assassinated, his body disintegrates into multiple floating orbs of light while his clothes are left behind.

Koro-sensei's name is a pun on the words korosenai (殺せない, lit. unkillable) and sensei (先生, lit. teacher).

Koro-sensei appears as a playable character in the video game J-Stars Victory VS.

=== Nagisa Shiota ===
Voiced by: Nozomi Yamamoto (vomic), Nao Tōyama (event anime), Mai Fuchigami (TV anime) (Japanese); Lindsay Seidel (English)
Actor portrayal: Ryosuke Yamada

Nagisa Shiota (潮田 渚, Shiota Nagisa) is the main human protagonist of the series. He is one of the students in Class 3-E and the series' narrator. Nagisa is seen as one of the weakest students in the class due to his small stature and mediocre physical abilities that are comparable to some of the girls in the class. However, he is actually the most talented to become an assassin out of all the students, something that is acknowledged by Koro-sensei and Karasuma. He is able to draw closer while hiding his bloodlust to make a surprise attack and is able to make his opponents falter through his bloodlust alone. Nagisa usually writes down Koro-sensei's weaknesses, which at first seem minor (since they do not look like major weaknesses). However, some of them are eventually revealed to be useful as the students are almost able to kill Koro-sensei because of one of these weaknesses. Outwardly friendly and polite to his friends and everyone, he hides a somewhat darker side of him as an assassin that is not noticeable during daily life and is only revealed during training and assassination time. When engaged in battle, Nagisa becomes a brutal assassin who would throw away his life if it meant killing his target. According to Karasuma, whenever Nagisa unleashes his killing intent, he is not training and truly goes for a kill.

At home, Nagisa lives with his chronically absent father and abusive mother. His mother tries to live vicariously through him by making him follow her exact life plan for him, because she experienced a lot of failure in life and was also never allowed to look like a "pretty girl" by her parents. This causes her to constantly tell him she wishes he was born a girl and make him grow his hair long, which she only lets him tie up because if he unties, he still looks like a girl. His mother is also the foundation for his assassination talents, because whenever he tries to defy her when she is in what he perceives as a "gloomy" moment, she grabs and screams at him, so he learned to tell the difference between her "cheerful" and "gloomy" moments, in order to prevent some of her abuse.

Nagisa realizes that this is similar to the "Wavelengths of Consciousness" that the Reaper, the world's best assassin, talks about. After this realization, he tells Koro-sensei he has the talent to be an assassin in a career planning meeting. His home life improves and his desire to be an assassin wanes after he saves his mother from an assassin, which in turn gave him time to realize his talents can be used to save people and she realized that she cannot hold onto him forever. When the time comes for Class 3-E to finally end Koro-sensei's life, Nagisa offers to deal the killing blow, which he regrettably does. During the graduation ceremony, Nagisa learns, much to his joy, that before his death, Koro-sensei talked with his father as well and helped him reconcile with his mother. During his time with Koro-sensei, Nagisa eventually realizes that he wants to be a teacher like him.

After completing his studies, he becomes an intern at Gokuraka Private High School assigned to a dysfunctional class full of male delinquents and gang members, much to his chagrin. Nevertheless, he sets to work teaching and rehabilitating delinquent students while intimidating them into compliance with his bloodlust. In addition, Kaede implies that he will begin teaching at the old Class 3-E building in the future. He is also shown to have trimmed his long hair, although he sadly notes that he has not grown significantly taller at all since then. When Sumire Hara asks Kayano how things are between her and Nagisa, she bashfully replies that he is focused on his career at the moment.

=== Kaede Kayano / Akari Yukimura ===
Voiced by: Yō Taichi (vomic), Ayana Taketatsu (event anime), Aya Suzaki (TV anime) (Japanese); Monica Rial (English)
Actor portrayal: Maika Yamamoto

Kaede Kayano / Akari Yukimura (茅野 カエデ / 雪村 あかり, Kayano Kaede / Yukimura Akari) is one of Nagisa's classmates and close friends, being the one who is mostly seen with him. She has an apparent affinity for pudding, once attempting to assassinate Koro-sensei with a giant pudding with explosives inside. She experiences a slight inferiority complex when it comes to sex appeal, especially her bust size, as she usually gets flustered towards girls with large breasts. Kaede is the smallest student in Class 3-E and is even shorter than Nagisa and Manami. She is also the student who comes up with Koro-sensei's name.

At the start of winter, she reveals her true identity to be professional method actress Akari Yukimura, the younger sister of Aguri Yukimura, the former Class 3-E teacher. Believing Koro-sensei to be her sister's killer, she stole and implanted tentacles from Shiro's facility onto the back of her neck and changed her identity in order to infiltrate Class 3-E, using her acting skills to hide her extensive blood lust from everyone until she was ready to make her move. However, using her tentacles in battle puts her life at risk, just like what happened with Itona, and before she dies, Koro-sensei manages to remove them from her body once Nagisa calms her down with a French kiss, shocking her to the point of passing out. It is also revealed that the time she spent with Koro-sensei and Class 3-E made her urge for vengeance falter over time and made her believe that there was more to Koro-sensei's past than what she had assumed. She then spends the winter break recovering at a hospital, and upon returning, decides to hide her newfound feelings for Nagisa in order to not give him trouble during their mission to assassinate Koro-sensei. During Koro-sensei's battle with Yanagisawa and the second Reaper, Kayano attempts to intervene, making use of the kinetic vision she obtained during the time she implanted the tentacles in her body, but is mortally wounded by the enemy, and to save her life, Koro-sensei performs an intricate surgery to restore her body up to the cellular level in order to save her life, a procedure he developed to ensure that the tragedy that happened with her sister would not be repeated, but exhausting himself in the process. After Koro-sensei's death, she resumes her acting career, becoming even more famous than before. When Sumire Hara asks Kayano how things are between her and Nagisa, she bashfully replies that he is focused on his career at the moment.

=== Karma Akabane ===
Voiced by: Nobunaga Shimazaki (vomic), Nobuhiko Okamoto (event anime/TV anime) (Japanese); Austin Tindle (English)
Actor portrayal: Masaki Suda

Karma Akabane (赤羽 業(カルマ), Akabane Karuma) is one of Nagisa's friends from previous school years, and considered to be the strongest and smartest among the Class 3-E students. He is the first one to be able to inflict injuries on Koro-sensei during their first meeting. He was suspended from school prior to Koro-sensei's arrival by his class' homeroom teacher due to his extremely violent behavior. Unlike most students in the class that were relegated there due to their low grades, Karma is one of the school's most gifted students as he is the only one able to match Gakushū in terms of test results and grades, but developed a rebellious attitude due to his previous teacher's betrayal after he severely wounded a top third-year student while saving a bullied student from Class 3-E, as despite believing he has done the right thing, his teacher revealed that he was only siding with him due to his grades to increase his reputation and did not want to be held responsible for what happened. Karma then brutally beat the teacher, leading to his transfer to Class 3-E. Because of this experience, Karma originally distrusts Koro-sensei, but Karma begins to accept him after realizing Koro-sensei is unlike the other treacherous teachers at the school. He and Nagisa have a tense friendship, which slowly develops into a heated rivalry, culminating in a battle to decide whether they should kill Koro-sensei or not. After losing the battle, he grows closer to Nagisa and even begins addressing him without any honorifics. He is also one of two to tease Kaede about her feelings towards Nagisa together with Rio.

After graduation, he decides to enlist on a government test with the intent of carving his own territory in politics.

== Antagonists ==
=== Gakuhō Asano ===
Voiced by: Hideo Ishikawa (vomic), Shō Hayami (TV anime), Chris Rager (English)
Gakuhō Asano (浅野 學峯, Asano Gakuhō) is board Chairman of Kunugigaoka Junior High School and Gakushū Asano's father. Responsible for Class 3-E's current condition, he and his son share a tense competitive relationship with each other. Gakuhō's teaching skills are seemingly on par with Koro-sensei's, and he seems to know the latter's secret. He eventually takes over as the teacher of Class 3-A in order to prove their superiority over Class 3-E once and for all. Gakuhō becomes more and more desperate as finals near, and eventually uses a teaching method that induces the entire Class 3-A, with the exception of Gakushū, into a zombie-like trance that makes them sacrifice their own personal well-being for the sake of studying. These events lead Gakushū to conclude that his father is insane and must be stopped. Gakuhō eventually falls into full-blown madness after his teaching methods fail to allow Class 3-A to beat Class 3-E and several 3-A students begin to contemplate transferring to Class 3-E. It is later revealed that when he had just started the Kunugigaoka Cram School, he was a passionate, caring, and talented teacher like Koro-sensei, but changed his ideal educational system after a tragic incident where one of his first three students, an aspiring basketball player, committed suicide due to constant bullying. He believed that it was due to him not teaching his students to be strong. This belief, combined with his guilt and grief, led him to become cold and calculating, and he avenged his student by ruining the lives of the bullies by getting them addicted to gambling. After being defeated by Koro-sensei personally, he accepts defeat and has shown some changes in his personality, while still refusing to give up on his educational policy. He also reconciles with Gakushū after they both decide to sue each other and the two ultimately spend some time bonding over the filing of their individual suits and dreaming of the payouts they will get. He is apparently aware of Kayano's true identity as she was the student he demoted to Class 3-E for intentionally breaking one of his possessions when she first transferred to Kunugigaoka. After Koro-sensei's death, the Class 3-E system is abolished and Gakuhō resigns from his position on the government's orders after the public found out about his draconian teaching methods. While he is packing up his office, however, he is visited by the remaining two students from his very first class, and begins catching up with them over a bottle of wine.

=== Shiro / Kōtarō Yanagisawa ===
Voiced by: Ryōta Takeuchi (TV anime), Mitsuaki Madono (Yanagisawa) (Japanese); J. Michael Tatum (English)
Actor portrayal: Hiroki Narimiya
A mysterious scientist who cloaks himself in anti-sensei material, Shiro (シロ) first appears as Itona's guardian and tutor, bestowing him with the tentacles on his head and providing him the medication needed to treat it. After several failed attempts however, he abandons Itona, soon taking an interest in Kaede's potential. Once Kaede fails as well, he reveals himself as Kōtarō Yanagisawa (柳沢 誇太郎), the lead scientist who performed the experiments that transformed the former Reaper into Koro-sensei and destroyed the Moon due to experimenting with a rat, thus making him the primary antagonist of the series. He also was Aguri's fiancé, and always mistreated her due to her low birth in comparison to his wealthy and well-connected family, and always saw her as only a tool. He holds a grudge against Koro-sensei, who completely shattered his pride upon taking control of the experiment and winning Aguri's favor, along with taking one of his eyes and seeks to kill Koro-sensei at any cost, but not before making him suffer by killing all his students first. He later returns after taking the second Reaper under his guard and modifying his body for them to enact revenge of Koro-sensei together in the final hour of the deadline before his explosion. Yanagisawa's body ends up disintegrated when he is blown away by a beam fired by Koro-sensei against the second Reaper and comes in contact with an anti-tentacle barrier, leaving him in a semi-vegetative state, while his anti-matter research was cancelled by the government.

=== Akira Takaoka ===
Voiced by: Kenta Miyake (TV anime) (Japanese); Justin Cook (English)
Actor portrayal: Masanobu Takashima
Akira Takaoka (鷹岡 明, Takaoka Akira) is a soldier who trained alongside Karasuma and was jealous of his abilities. He is sent to Class 3-E in order to take over their assassination training, but is forced to leave after being defeated by Nagisa, because of how sadistic his training was. He later returns, more insane than ever and he scarred his own face, he was laughed at by his peers after his defeat by Nagisa. During Class 3-E's field trip to Okinawa where he poisons more than half the class, with the only cure in his possession, he orders Nagisa and Kayano to bring Koro-sensei to him at his hotel room. Instead, Nagisa, Karasuma, and the remaining healthy students infiltrate his hotel and defeat his hired assassins, leading to a confrontation on the hotel roof. He then challenges Nagisa to a one on one fight to exact revenge for his earlier defeat, blowing up the case containing the cure to throw Nagisa into despair. However, after sustaining a beating at Takaoka's hands, Nagisa manages to stun him with Lovro's secret surefire assassination technique. Takaoka's worst fear is realized when Nagisa gives him the same innocent smile he had worn before surprising and defeating Takaoka the first time, before knocking him out with a stun baton. Takaoka stated that Nagisa's innocent smile will haunt him in his nightmares for the rest of his life. It is then revealed that the cure was unnecessary to begin with, as Takaoka's hired assassins had supplied him with a non-lethal poison, having privately agreed beforehand not to follow their employer's murderous plans. Takaoka is then taken arrested by the military, but he was later released from custody and began worshiping Nagisa as a goddess.

=== The Reaper ===
Voiced by: Nobunaga Shimazaki (Japanese); Ian Sinclair, Justin Briner (younger) (English)
The Reaper (死神, Shinigami) is the number one assassin in the world, who starts to hunt down other assassins and eventually targets Class 3-E and Koro-sensei. He initially appears as a harmless florist, but his true form is hidden behind killing intent so thick that he appears to be shrouded in darkness, leaving his true appearance a mystery. In actuality, he peeled the skin from his face so as to become a master of disguise and has heavily modified his own body to become an efficient killer, such as implanting a small caliber gun in his index finger. He eventually convinces Irina to join him and kidnaps Class 3-E to draw out Koro-sensei, but is thwarted by Taiga and Sōsuke's skill with paint and cameras, before being betrayed by Irina and defeated by Karasuma in a fistfight before being detained and put under Yanagisawa's care. He is eventually revealed to be the second Reaper, the original being Koro-sensei, his former master, whom he betrayed upon believing that he had learned all he could from him and also being resentful of Koro-sensei not looking at him as a person. Initially he looked up to him and even to his death, wished to be acknowledged by him and to be just like him. Unfortunately, Koro-sensei only saw him as a tool since he had yet to learn compassion and empathy. Disillusioned, he took the title of Reaper after he betrayed Koro-sensei by letting him be captured by security guards after an assassination job. Since his confinement he went under Yanagisawa's experiments to prepare him for a final confrontation with Koro-sensei in order for both to enact their revenge on him, after the scientist revealed to him that his former mentor and the teacher of Class 3-E are the one and the same. Having a much more imposing and terrifying monstruous tentacled figure than his predecessor, the enhanced second Reaper possesses many more tentacles than Koro-sensei and is capable of moving twice as fast than him. However, even with such improvements, he ends up being killed by Koro-sensei who blasts him with the a beam powered with his emotions, stabs him in the heart and throwing him against an anti-sensei barrier disintegrating him. Before Koro-sensei finished him off, he apologizes to his former student for not guiding him properly during their time as master and pupil before promising to start over if they meet again in the afterlife, reconciling at last.

== Supporting characters ==
=== Kunugigaoka Junior High School ===
==== Teachers ====
The following are teachers at Kunugigaoka Junior High School:

Tadaomi Karasuma (烏間 惟臣, Karasuma Tadaomi)
Voiced by: Kōsuke Toriumi (vomic), Junichi Suwabe (event anime), Tomokazu Sugita (TV anime) (Japanese); Chris Ryan (English)
Actor portrayal: Kippei Shiina
Tadaomi Karasuma is a government worker associated with the Ministry of Defense. He first appeared announcing Koro-sensei's deal with the government and their mission to assassinate him before the end of the year. He later became the assistant teacher and P.E. instructor of class 3-E, using his lessons to train the students in assassination techniques. He is well known among militaries for his outstanding reputation and is a powerful individual, which he has proven when he easily overpowered Irina's master, who is a retired professional hit man, and even Koro-sensei himself is afraid upon seeing his capability for the first time. He is strict, but a kind man, though he keeps a distance between himself and the students due to his status as an agent and his own professionalism. He is one of a few who is perceptive enough to see Nagisa's talent as an assassin. In the epilogue, he becomes a high ranking official in Japanese Intelligence and the husband to Irina even though he still treats her quite the same as during their time as teachers.
Irina Jelavić (イリーナ・イェラビッチ, Irīna Yerabitchi; Serbian: Ирина Јелавић)
Voiced by: Masumi Asano (vomic), Yui Horie (event anime), Shizuka Itō (TV anime) (Japanese); Martha Harms (English)
Actor portrayal: Kang Ji-young
She is a professional hitwoman of Serbian origin who is hired to kill Koro-sensei by becoming a part-time foreign language teacher in Class 3-E. She uses her charm to seduce Koro-sensei, initially making him obey her commands. However, her first assassination attempt is foiled when Koro-sensei is able to suppress her three hired mercenaries attacks. This ends in her humiliation in front of all the students, and she swears revenge. She teaches the students how to seduce people from other countries, so that with this method, they can learn foreign languages, and usually punishes male students who fail to answer her questions during her lessons by kissing them until they pass out from being overwhelmed. Much to her dismay, she is nicknamed "Professor Bitch" (ビッチ先生, Bicchi-sensei) (formally Ms. Hellabitch) by her students. She develops genuine feelings for Karasuma later on, and eventually starts a relationship with him, later becoming his wife and working under him for the Japanese Government as a spy.
Aguri Yukimura (雪村 あぐり, Yukimura Aguri)
Voiced by: Ayako Kawasumi (Japanese); Whitney Rodgers (English)
Actor portrayal: Mirei Kiritani
The late former teacher of Class 3-E, she was Kaede's older sister and Yanagisawa's fiancée. Aguri first met Koro-sensei when he was still a human, tasked to watch over him during the time he was experimented on and bonded with him during their time together. When Koro-sensei broke free, Aguri attempted to calm him down, just to be killed by one of the weapons used against him. In her dying breath, Aguri asked Koro-sensei to watch over Class 3-E in her place, as she had no one else to turn to, to which he complies. She had a penchant for wearing T-shirts with goofy prints, even during the experiments on Koro-sensei.

==== Students ====
These are the students of Kunugigaoka Junior High School:

===== Class 3-E =====
Class 3-E (nicknamed E as in 'End Class') is a subdivision of the Kunugigaoka Junior High School. Class 3-E is notorious for containing a group of students with naturally low grades. Conventionally, it is composed of twenty eight students who could not either compete with the school's standard level of study, nor comply with its overly rigid code of discipline, among others who were subjected to some form of unfair punishment. Obligated to attend class in a run down school building, set in a mountain far from the rest of the school's premises, the students of Class 3-E are largely discriminated against by the rest of their peers. The students of this class are assigned the mission to assassinate their homeroom teacher, Koro-sensei, for the compensation of ¥10 billion (equivalent to $93,038,500.00 USD as of July 8, 2020, €82,420,000.00 EUR as of July 8, 2020, and £74,140,000 GBP as of July 8, 2020). Aside from such generous reward, some students have other reasons for killing Koro-sensei, which are explained through the story. As time goes on, each student finds his or her own unique killing technique and find themselves becoming more self-confident and happy, while Koro-sensei's true identity and reasons for becoming their teacher are revealed as the year progresses.

Manami Okuda (奥田 愛美, Okuda Manami)
Voiced by: Miho Arakawa (event anime), Sayuri Yahagi (TV anime) (Japanese); Felecia Angelle (English)
Actor portrayal: Miku Uehara
She is a student of Class 3-E who uses aspects of chemistry to her advantage in assassination. Manami is naive, guileless and honest; when she has hands bottles of poison over to Koro-sensei, she informs him of their intoxication, but begs him to drink them anyway. Manami admits that she is terrible with language and speech and has difficulty to communicate with others due to this. She favours math and chemical formulas because the solutions are precise and unambiguous and deems clever wordplay and analyses of complicated emotions as unnecessary. After Koro-sensei's lesson, she gradually grasps the concept that the power of language is also important, and not simply science alone. Her first friends are Kanzaki and Kayano, and she also becomes close with Karma. After graduation, she shown to work together with Takebayashi as a scientist, using her knowledge of Koro-sensei's biology to develop medical breakthroughs.
Yukiko Kanzaki (神崎 有希子, Kanzaki Yukiko)
Voiced by: Rina Satō (event anime), Satomi Satō (TV anime) (Japanese); Leah Clark (English)
Actor portrayal: Mio Yūki
She is a student of Class 3-E. Yukiko is diligent and ladylike, and she is popular with her classmates and the most popular girl in the class. She comes from a high-class family that is very strict and demands that she gets only good grades, has good background, and finds a good job. Last year, wanting to runaway from her lifestyle and the issues with her father, she changed her appearance and went to play in arcade games without anyone recognizing her. However, because of her "playing background", she is assigned into Class 3-E. However, after listening to Koro-sensei's words, she starts to have confidence in herself for who she is. After graduating, she is seen helping Matsukata, the principal of a local cram school that Class 3-E helped out.
Tomohito Sugino (杉野 友人, Sugino Tomohito)
Voiced by: Yūtarō Honjō (event anime), Yoshitaka Yamaya (TV anime) (Japanese); Clifford Chapin (English)
Actor portrayal: Riku Ichikawa
He is one of the students and Nagisa's best friend. He used to be a baseball player in their school's baseball club until he was assigned into Class 3-E, kicking him out of the club. He dreams of becoming a professional baseball player like his idol, Arita, and emulates his techniques to improve his own performance in baseball and is shown to very dedicated to it. He also sometimes uses his baseball techniques in his attempts to kill Koro-sensei. After the baseball tournament exhibition match between the Baseball Club and Class 3-E, he becomes proper friends with Shindō, and they promise to hopefully face off again in high school, with Sugino musing to himself if Earth is still around by then. He has a massive crush on Kanzaki. After graduation, he manages to become a professional baseball player.
Yūma Isogai (磯貝 悠馬, Isogai Yūma)
Voiced by: Yūto Uemura (event anime), Ryōta Ōsaka (TV anime) (Japanese); Jerry Jewell (English)
Actor portrayal: Yuuhi Kato
Yūma is the class president of Class 3-E. He is well-liked by his classmates and the ladies who regularly visit the café he works at. He is considered to be an "Ikemen" by his classmates, because of his good-looks and his friendly, hard-working and modest personality. He even receives love letters from the students of the main school buildings. He comes from a poor background; living with his mother, who is suffering from an illness, and a younger brother and sister. To help make ends meet he worked part-time, which is not allowed in their school, hence his demotion to Class 3-E. Due to his background, he is said to be very versatile with food, able to cook and consume goldfish. His classmates also note how he is able to look stylish, even whilst wearing bargain clothing, further boosting his "Ikemen" image. He is also shown to be a good leader, as he was able to lead the Class 3-E boys to victory against Class 3-A in the Boutaoshi. Maehara is his best friend since childhood.
Ryōma Terasaka (寺坂 竜馬, Terasaka Ryōma)
Voiced by: Subaru Kimura (TV anime) (Japanese); Marcus D. Stimac (English)
Actor portrayal: Ken Sugawara
The biggest in Class 3-E, and leader of his own clique of rebels within it. He is an outcast who thought he could do what he desired while in Class 3-E, feeling at home with others who had no direction. This all changed with the arrival of Koro-sensei, who gave them something to strive for, and he was frustrated at being left behind. He initially does not care about the assassination, but he changes after being used and deceived by Shiro in a plot to kill Koro-sensei which nearly killed the other students of Class 3-E. He tries to atone for his past mistakes, as shown when he still joins the others' infiltration in the island arc and tells Nagisa to not tell anyone that the illness also affected him. He even uses the money from Shiro to buy an expensive Taser to hopefully help with the assassination. Later on, with his group he also heads the attempt to get Itona to let go of his tentacles. He desires to be a politician in the future, and after graduation, his tenacity catches the attention of an important politician, who takes him as his apprentice.
Taiga Okajima (岡島 大河, Okajima Taiga)
Voiced by: Takayuki Nakatsukasa (event anime), Ryō Naitō (TV anime) (Japanese); Nick Haley (English)
Actor portrayal: Kouki Osamura
The pervert of Class 3-E. His interests led him to be good at photography. His main assassination strategy tends to involve playing on Koro-sensei's fondness for women with large breasts, such as using pornography to lure Koro-sensei into danger, or using pornography as a bribe.
Masayoshi (Justice) Kimura (木村 正義 (ジャスティス), Kimura Masayoshi (Justice))
Voiced by: Akihiro Hashida (event anime), Shunsuke Kawabe (TV anime) (Japanese); Jean-Luc Hester, Dylan Ray Owen (Our Time) (English)
Actor portrayal: Arai Shota
The fastest runner of Class 3-E, even enough to be at an Olympic level. His parents were dedicated workers of the police, so they gave him the name "Justice". He does not like his name so he goes by Masayoshi, another way the kanji "Justice" can be read. However, thanks to lessons from Koro-sensei, Masayoshi comes to accept the name his parents gave him.
Sōsuke Sugaya (菅谷 創介, Sugaya Sōsuke)
Voiced by: Eiji Miyashita (TV anime) (Japanese); Kyle Phillips (English)
Actor portrayal: Ozawa Guami
The artist and disguise specialist of Class 3-E. His parents were ashamed of his bad grades, as well as his being, in their opinion, unnecessarily good at art, which they did not think would amount to anything for his future. When Koro-sensei replied to his doodles, he felt a sense of acknowledgement and happiness. He finds comfort in the open-mindedness of Koro-sensei and can feel at home in Class 3-E. After graduation, he becomes an artist working on a large-scale project at a museum.
Hiroto Maehara (前原 陽斗, Maehara Hiroto)
Voiced by: Kenn (event anime), Shintarō Asanuma (TV anime) (Japanese); Chris Burnett (English)
Actor portrayal: Ryunosuke Okada
The womanizer in Class 3-E, Maehara has a carefree personality and believes in just going from one relationship to the next if it does not work out. Isogai is his best friend since childhood.
Kōtarō Takebayashi (竹林 孝太郎, Takebayashi Kōtarō)
Voiced by: Takahiro Mizushima (TV anime) (Japanese); Scott Hinze (English)
Actor portrayal: Yoshihara Takuya
The anime and maid cafe fan and the bomb specialist of Class 3-E. Takebayashi is mostly a quiet person. However, he seems somewhat eccentric in his behavior and stands out as the oddball in the class. He also seems to be clumsy at physical activity, having ping pong balls hit his glasses while playing with others and nearly losing balance in one of Tadaomi Karasuma's lessons. Takebayashi's family have been doctors for generations. His elder brothers are all in Tokyo University in the medical departments. As such, there is enormous pressure for him to succeed, and he is considered the outcast of the family. He is the only student who decides to leave Class 3-E for personal reasons. He was nearly deceived by Gakuhō and Gakushū upon leaving the class but he has become motivated in killing after he realized that his old classmates and Koro-sensei still look after him. He eventually returns to Class 3-E after a bold speech and destroying one of Gakuhō's possessions from his office. After graduation, he is shown to have become a scientist and is currently working with Manami to create medical breakthroughs based on Koro-sensei's biology.
Ryūnosuke Chiba (千葉 龍之介, Chiba Ryūnosuke)
Voiced by: Junji Majima (TV anime) (Japanese); Z. Charles Bolton (English)
Actor portrayal: Takumi Ooka
Chiba is a serious and stoic boy. He is very calm and business-like and does not talk a lot. Like Hayami, he has been compared to a working adult and though the two are very similar, Chiba is shown to be less stoic than Hayami. Chiba is the best marksman among the boys of Class 3-E. He excels in spatial calculation and as such is unmatched in long distance shooting. His abilities have even earned him the praises of Lovro, a hitman dealer and a retired assassin.
Kōki Mimura (三村 航輝, Mimura Kōki)
Voiced by: Tomohiro Yamaguchi (event anime), Shinya Takahashi (TV anime) (Japanese); Joel McDonald (English)
Actor portrayal: Mikawa Yusae
An aspiring movie director, Mimura edited the short film that Class 3-E used in their plan in the Island Arc, and later directed during the class play. He is secretly passionate about air guitar, which embarrasses him whenever it is brought up.
Takuya Muramatsu (村松 拓哉, Muramatsu Takuya)
Voiced by: Takayuki Miyamoto (event anime), Kōki Harasawa (TV anime) (Japanese); Eric Cherry (English)
Actor portrayal: Takao Yuji
Noodle specialist, and part of Terasaka's gang. He is compliant with his father's bad recipe for noodles for the time being, but knows that his skills can be used to make it much better for when he takes over. One of the best chefs of the class, considering Hara his main rival. After graduation, he continues his father business, along with Yoshida, while studying management in college.
Taisei Yoshida (吉田 大成, Yoshida Taisei)
Voiced by: Yoshiyuki Shimozuma (TV anime) (Japanese); Orion Pitts (English)
Actor portrayal: Hasegawa Tity
Motorbike specialist, and part of Terasaka's gang. He was born and raised in the motorbike factory. He had not been able to relate with anyone else in Class 3-E about loving vehicles before, and Koro-sensei uses the "manly hobby" as a point to bond with him, but that made him break with Terasaka once. However, he rebuilds a stronger friendship with Terasaka after he changes his attitude. Childhood friend of Hara. After graduation, he also continues his father's business, along with Muramatsu, while studying management in college.
Meg Kataoka (片岡 メグ, Kataoka Megu)
Voiced by: Kaori Goto (event anime), Chie Matsuura (TV anime) (Japanese); Morgan Garrett, Colleen Clinkenbeard (Episode 17 Season 2 Broadcast Dub) (English)
Actor portrayal: Kanon Miyahara
Female class representative. Megu has exceptional talent. She excels in both academics and athletics. She is the best swimmer in Class 3-E, and trains for an assassination plan involving pulling Koro-sensei into the water, but the plan fails. She is popular with other girls, evidenced by receiving love letters from them, and has the nickname "Ikemegu".
Hinata Okano (岡野 ひなた, Okano Hinata)
Voiced by: Kanako Hino (event anime), Minami Tanaka (TV anime) (Japanese); Didi Archilla (English)
Actor portrayal: Saki Takahashi
Okano excels in knifework and is considered one of the two best out of all the girls in Class 3-E. Her gymnast background allows her to have unpredictable movements, and she is extremely agile. After graduation, she begins using Class 3-E's old campus and the forest surrounding it as a training ground for her university's athletic club.
Hinano Kurahashi (倉橋 陽菜乃, Kurahashi Hinano)
Voiced by: Ayaka Fukuyama (event anime), Hisako Kanemoto (TV anime) (Japanese); Kristen McGuire (English)
Actor portrayal: Rena Shimura
The biologist of Class 3-E. She is so natural and simple as well as very cute that she is on very good terms with other girls and loved by the boys in Class 3-E. In the anime, it is shown that she has a crush on Karasuma. After graduation she begins using Class 3-E's old campus and surrounding mountainside as a place to take kids on nature trips.
Rio Nakamura (中村 莉桜, Nakamura Rio)
Voiced by: Miho Tabata (event anime), Manami Numakura (TV anime) (Japanese); Apphia Yu (English)
Actor portrayal: Seika Taketomi
Class E's best in English. She likes to tease Nagisa due to his androgynous appearance by having him cross dress as a girl. However, she apologizes to him upon learning his family circumstances. As a child, she had darker hair but dyed it blonde upon reaching middle school. She was called a genius in primary school but because she desired to be "normal" like her classmates, she began engaging in constant horseplay to the point that she forgot to study, which caused her once high grades to plummet. She realized the importance of what she lost when she saw her parents' reaction to her low grades. She admits that she wants to be smart again but she also desires to be like her classmates and that she was able to accomplish this in Class 3-E, which she is very thankful to Koro-sensei for. However, when Nagisa proposes a plan to help Koro-sensei without the need to kill him, she objects, claiming that her bonds with him are just of an assassin and her target. After graduation, she is last seen hanging out with students at a British university in London near the Palace of Westminster which is the Parliament of the United Kingdom.
Rinka Hayami (速水 凛香, Hayami Rinka)
Voiced by: Miho Morisaki (event anime), Shiho Kawaragi (TV anime) (Japanese); Jamie Marchi (English)
Actor portrayal: Ayano Nichinin Takano
Best marksman for the females of Class 3-E. She is reliable, but because her classmates depended on her too much without her complaining, she neglected her own grades and fell into Class 3-E. At the beginning of the manga and chapters set before Koro-sensei, she used to not tie her hair.
Sumire Hara (原 寿美鈴, Hara Sumire)
Voiced by: Nozomi Yamane (event anime), Miho Hino (TV anime) (Japanese); Michelle Lee (English)
Actor portrayal: Kaneko Umion
The cook with a motherly personality. She wishes to become a housewife in the future. Since she has known Yoshida since she was a child, she is on good terms with Terasaka's group.
Yuzuki Fuwa (不破 優月, Fuwa Yuzuki)
Voiced by: Kana Ueda (TV anime) (Japanese); Kristi Kang, Rebecca Danae (Our Time) (English)
Actor portrayal: Rena Takeda
The manga specialist of Class 3-E. She is able to use her likes to come up with detective reasoning, and has a good investigative eye. Her excitability makes her enjoy coming up with theories, some of which may be off-mark and sound more fantastic and fictional instead. Other students usually play straight man when she breaks the fourth wall.
Tōka Yada (矢田 桃花, Yada Tōka)
Voiced by: Megumi Toda (event anime), Ayaka Suwa (TV anime) (Japanese); Michelle Rojas (English)
Actor portrayal: Arisa Matsunaga
The infiltration specialist of Class 3-E. She is fairly close with Bitch-sensei and takes the most interest in the latter's stories of past experiences as well as learning the art of infiltration, negotiation, seduction. She is known for having the largest bust in Class 3-E. Her future goal is to get a job in the business sector.
Kirara Hazama (狭間 綺羅々, Hazama Kirara)
Voiced by: Asumi Sakamoto (event anime), Fūko Saitō (TV anime) (Japanese); Terri Doty (English)
Actor portrayal: Okuma Anmi
The only female student of Class 3-E who hangs around with Terasaka's group. She likes to be surrounded with books so her desired career is to become a librarian. Her mother is into fairytale aesthetics, which is in sharp contrast to her own daughter's dark tendencies. She enjoys creeping people out on purpose, and seems entertained by the subsequent reactions. She wrote Class 3-E's play to ruin the other classes' moods or appetites on purpose. After graduation, she is seen working at a library.
Ritsu (律) / Autonomous Intelligence Fixed Artillery (自律思考固定砲台, Jiritsu Shikō Kotei Hōdai)
Voiced by: Saki Fujita (TV anime) (Japanese); Bryn Apprill (English)
Actor portrayal: Kanna Hashimoto
An AI developed by Norway and sent to Class 3-E as a transfer student to dispose of Koro-sensei, able to learn his movement patterns and perfect her shooting skills in order to eventually kill him. After receiving a few modifications from Koro-sensei, she develops a conscience and becomes friends with the rest of Class 3-E, who give her a shortened nickname. Thanks to her processing power, she frequently helps with intel gathering and communications and usually interacts with others via a smartphone application developed by her classmates. After graduation, Ritsu enjoys herself traveling through cyberspace and upgrading her code, while providing aid to her former classmates when needed.
Itona Horibe (堀部 糸成, Horibe Itona)
Voiced by: Megumi Ogata (TV anime) (Japanese); Ricco Fajardo (English)
Actor portrayal: Seishirō Katō
The second transfer student sent to assassinate Koro-sensei. Previously known as Koro-sensei's brother (due to being implanted with the same tentacles that the former possessed), he used to possess tentacles that came out of his hair, until they were removed for his safety. He is also revealed to be a member of a family gifted with electronics. However, they were unable to compete and went bankrupt before he ran away once his father disappeared. Initially obsessed with killing Koro-sensei and prodded on by Shiro, he calms down after having his implants removed. He becomes the machinery and electronics expert for Class 3-E due to his family's expertise in electronics before going bankrupt. He hangs out with Terasaka's group as its fifth member, and after graduating high school, returns to his family's factory, hoping to restore it. When asked what will happen if he falls on hard times again, he plans on relying on Muramutsu and Yoshida to help him restart due to their university studies on management.

===== Class 3-A =====
Class 3-A is the class of top students in Kunugigaoka Junior High School. Its five highest ranked students dubbed themselves as the Big Five (五英傑, Go Eiketsu, lit. "Five Virtuosos").

Gakushū Asano (浅野 学秀, Asano Gakushū)
Voiced by: Mamoru Miyano (TV anime) (Japanese); Micah Solusod (English)
Son of the Board Chairman of Kunugigaoka Junior High School, Gakuhō Asano. He is the clever but arrogant leader of Class 3-A and also the school's student council president. Oblivious to Class 3-E's secret, he similarly looks down upon them like the rest of the school and is dedicated to suppressing them like the rest. However, he has a strained relationship with his father, who only communicates with him in order to teach him something. To this end, he also seeks to eventually defeat his father intellectually and expose his darkest secrets, including those of Class 3-E. His main rivals are Karma, who is the only student on Class 3-E as gifted as him and who eventually defeats him in the final exams, and Isogai due to being fellow class president and having similarly-strong leadership qualities. Initially angered by their dogged victories over the rest of the school, over time he becomes humbled by them and acknowledges Class 3-E as worthy rivals as he claims that they were able to bring out the best in him and his classmates because they themselves were strong. Once Gakuhō begins resorting to physical and emotional abuse against Class 3-A to defeat 3-E, Gakushū eventually decides he has had enough and goes so far as to ask Class 3-E for help by having them beat Class 3-A completely and fairly during their final exams; they assure him that that is their plan. Once they are defeated, Gakushū allows the class to take solace in him and each other, while taunting Gakuhō for failing ideologically as the rest of Class 3-A finally stands up to him and acknowledges Class 3-E's skill. After Gakuhō is himself humbled by Koro-sensei, the father and son begin to reconcile to some extent. During graduation, Gakushū renews his rivalry with Karma upon knowing that he will remain at the academy for the High School, and claims that he will eventually force him to reveal the truth behind what happened at Class 3-E during the course of the year.
Teppei Araki (荒木 鉄平, Araki Teppei)
Voiced by: Anri Katsu (TV anime) (Japanese); Jessie James Grelle (English)
Head of the broadcasting club, specialized in media.
Ren Sakakibara (榊原 蓮, Sakakibara Ren)
Voiced by: Kaito Ishikawa (Japanese); Justin Pate (English)
The student council secretary, specialized in arts.
Natsuhiko Koyama (小山 夏彦, Koyama Natsuhiko)
Voiced by: Teppei Akahira (Japanese); Aaron Roberts (English)
Head of the biology club and expert in memorization.
Tomoya Seo (瀬尾 智也, Seo Tomoya)
Voiced by: Shun Takagi (Japanese); David Trosko (English)
The student assembly chair, specialized in languages.

===== Other students =====
Nobuta Tanaka (田中 信太, Tanaka Nobuta) and Chōsuke Takada (高田 長助, Takada Chōsuke)
Nobuta Tanaka Voiced by: Hiroki Gotō (Japanese); Chris Guerrero (English)
Chosuke Takada Voiced by: Masahito Yabe (Japanese); Dallas Reid (English)
Nagisa's former classmates who are constantly seen poking fun at Class 3-E.
Kazutaka Shindō (進藤 一考, Shindō Kazutaka)
Voiced by: Takuya Sato (TV anime) (Japanese); Christopher Wehkamp (English)
A student of Class 3-A and ace of the school's baseball club that Sugino was once a member of. He previously mocked Sugino's role in Class 3-E, but after being beaten by them in a baseball game, he rekindles his friendship with Sugino and helps them out during one of the exams.
Ayaka Saitō (斎藤 綾香, Saitō Ayaka)
Portrayed by: Wakana Aoi
A student of Class 3-B and Nagisa's old friend who exclusively appears in the live-action film.

== Other characters ==
Lovro Brovski (ロヴロ・ブロフスキ, Roburo Burofusuki; Russian: Ловро Бровский)
Voiced by: Takashi Matsuyama (TV anime) (Japanese); Kent Williams (English)
A Russian assassin and the one who trained Irina before. He initially comes to Kunugigaoka Junior High School to take Irina back with him, feeling she is not capable of assassinating Koro-sensei, but she manages to prove otherwise. He later returns to help train Class 3-E, teaching Nagisa a powerful technique to use against his opponents. In one of his missions, he is wounded by the Reaper who uses a gun while not being detected. In later episodes the Reaper reveals this fact during the Reaper's attempt to assassinate Koro-sensai. He later appears in an episode where he finds Nagisa at the class 3-E restaurant.
Red Eye (レッドアイ, Reddo Ai)
Voiced by: Shin-ichiro Miki (event anime), Taiten Kusunoki (TV anime) (Japanese); Robert McCollum (English)
Actor portrayal: Tsuyoshi Abe
A talented sniper who is sent to Kyoto to assassinate Koro-sensei during a school trip. After several failed attempts, he gives up on his target after sharing a hot pot with him. He is later targeted and attacked by the Reaper and left for dead, but is later shown to have recovered. He is shown to have a valid hunting license for any country in the world.
Hiromi Shiota (潮田 広海, Shiota Hiromi)
Voiced by: Kotono Mitsuishi (TV anime) (Japanese); Caitlin Glass (English)
Nagisa's strict and abusive mother. She projects herself onto Nagisa, having hoped to live out the things she never got to experience in her own life vicariously through Nagisa's. This goes as far as to her always demanding Nagisa act like a girl despite being male, resulting in his insecure personality and effeminate look, as well as trying to push Nagisa into the university and company she had hoped to be part of but was denied. After Korosensei tells her during a parent-teacher conference that she cannot force this onto Nagisa and that she must make her own choices, Hiromi snaps and tries to convince Nagisa to burn down the Class 3-E building. However, following a confrontation with another assassin and Korosensei, she relents and begins to reconsider her actions after being rescued by Nagisa during these events. After Koro-sensei's death, it is revealed that she reconciled with her ex-husband with help from Koro-sensei.
Yūji Norita (法田 勇治, Norita Yūji)
Voiced by: Ayumu Murase (Japanese); Aaron Dismuke (English)
A bored and rich son of a famous actor. He met Nagisa (disguised as a girl) during the resort infiltration and fell in love with "her" after Nagisa inspired him to live a more productive life. After they part, he begins stalking Nagisa online and eventually decides to approach "her" at the school festival, which the other students of Class E decide to use as a ploy to get more money than Class A. Eventually though, he can tell Nagisa is putting on an act, leading Nagisa to admit his real gender. Although initially mortified, he eventually uses his status as a renowned food critic online to draw significant attention to Class E's festival restaurant, single-handedly getting them third place among the classes and significantly boosting their reputation.
Rikuto Ikeda (池田 陸翔, Ikeda Rikuto)
Voiced by: Daiki Yamashita (Japanese); Bryce Papenbrook (English)
One of the first three students in Gakuhō Asano's cram school ten years prior to the Assassination Classroom series. A promising basketball player, he eventually commits suicide due to constant bullying, darkening Asano's personality as the latter takes revenge against the bullies and becomes more ruthless until meeting Koro-sensei.
Mori (モリ)
Voiced by: Ayaka Nanase (Japanese); Tia Ballard (English)
One of the first three students in Gakuhō Asano's cram school ten years prior to the Assassination Classroom series. She was last seen meeting Asano after the latter begins to pack up upon being forced to resign from his junior high school over a bottle of wine.
Nakai (中井)
Voiced by: Gaku Kudō (Japanese); Stephen Sanders (English)
One of the first three students in Gakuhō Asano's cram school ten years prior to the Assassination Classroom series. He was last seen meeting Asano after the latter begins to pack up upon being forced to resign from his junior high school over a bottle of wine.
Matsukata (松方)
Voiced by: Kōsei Hirota (Japanese); R. Bruce Elliott (English)
The Principal of Wakaba Park Nursery School, he is injured by Class 3-E while the latter are practicing parkour. They later repay him as an apology by upgrading the daycare center he runs, babysitting the children there, and even donating a portion of the reward for killing Koro-sensei to the nursery. Seven years after Class 3-E graduates, he is last seen being helped by Kanzaki.
Sakura Kiyashiki (鬼屋敷 さくら, Kiyashiki Sakura)
Voiced by: Hibiku Yamamura (Japanese); Jill Harris (English)
A young elementary school student, she was constantly bullied at school and so went back to Wakaba Park Nursery School run by Matsukata to avoid interacting with fellow students her age. While she was initially hostile to Class 3-E, she eventually opened up to Nagisa while the latter becomes her personal tutor. He helps gives her the confidence to go back while she begins to have a crush on him. Seven years after Class 3-E graduates, she is last seen as a high school student interacting in a more confident manner with her peers.
Kunudon (くぬどん, Kunudon)
Voiced by: Kurumi Mamiya (Japanese); Lindsay Seidel (English)
The mascot of Kinugigaoka Junior High. Through a series of animated sections, Kunudon passive-aggressively reinforces the hierarchy of the school. Kunudon is eventually "sent to 3-E" by Asano following the latter's defeat, and is forced to take refuge in the old campus, where he becomes an alcoholic.
