= Yoshiyuki Shimozuma =

Japanese voice actor (born 1977)

- 下妻 由幸
- Born: March 27, 1977 (age 49); Hiroshima Prefecture, Japan
- Occupation: Voice actor
- Years active: 2007–present
- Agent: Kenyu Office

Yoshiyuki Shimozuma (下妻 由幸, Shimozuma Yoshiyuki; born March 27, 1977) is a Japanese voice actor from Hiroshima Prefecture, Japan. He is affiliated with Kenyu Office.

== Filmography ==
=== Anime ===
2010

- Yu-Gi-Oh! 5D's (Rick, Hans)

2012

- Kingdom (Qu Hai)
- Gon (Saachii)
- The New Prince of Tennis (Chikahiko Matsudaira)

2013

- Galilei Donna (Marco)
- Gifu Dodo!! Kanetsugu to Keiji (Yamada Kihachi)
- Kingdom Season 2 (Qu Hai, Kō)
- Ace of Diamond (Kenjirō Shirasu, Hiroya Hosodayama, Nobu, Murata, Ninomiya, Daiki Fukuda, Yūto Mino)
- Teekyu (Bobby)
- Mushibugyo (Hideyori Toyotomi, Shidō)

2014

- Baby Steps (Nariyuki Koshimizu, Tanaka)
- Yowamushi Pedal Grande Road (Ryō Ibitani)

2015

- Assassination Classroom (Taisei Yoshida)
- Etotama (Tenchō)
- Gon (Choro)
- Ace of Diamond: Second Season (Kenjirō Shirasu, Kajiyama, Ninomiya, Daiki Fukuda)
- Baby Steps Season 2 (Nariyuki Koshimizu, Christopher)

2017

- Sakura Quest (Shibukawa)
- Black Clover (Salim Hapshass)

2019

- Ace of Diamond act II (Kenjirō Shirasu)
- Beastars (Voss)

2021

- I-Chu: Halfway Through the Idol (Ban Jumonji)
- Sorcerous Stabber Orphen: Battle of Kimluck (Salua)
- Kuro-Gyaru ni Natta Kara Shinyū to Shite Mita (Hajime Tsuzuki)

2024

- The Witch and the Beast (Haynes' Subordinate)
- Orb: On the Movements of the Earth (Simon)

=== Original video animation ===
- Ace of Diamond (Kenjirō Shirasu)
- Saiyuki Gaiden (Yamamura)

=== Theatrical animation ===
- Yowamushi Pedal: The Movie (Ryō Ibitani)

=== Video games ===
- Black Survival (Hyunwoo, Rosalio, Jan)
- Far Cry 3 (Riley)
- Final Fantasy Crystal Chronicles Remastered (Bessamzan)
- Metal Max 4: Gekkō no Diva (Sego Marden)

=== Dubbing ===
==== Live-action ====
- 3-Headed Shark Attack (Greg)
- Assassin's Creed: Lineage (Ezio Auditore)
- The Bay (Mike)
- The Cabin in the Woods (Ronald the Intern (Tom Lenk))
- Car SOS (Tim Shaw)
- The Carrie Diaries (Sebastian Kydd (Austin Butler))
- A Cure for Wellness (Lockhart)
- Gilmore Girls (William)
- The Machine (Tim)
- Resident Evil: The Final Chapter (James Marks)
- The Shannara Chronicles (Wil Ohmsford)
- The Suite Life of Zack & Cody (Vance, Lenny)
- Whiskey Cavalier (Edgar Standish (Tyler James Williams))
- X-Men: Days of Future Past (Roberto da Costa/Sunspot)

==== Animation ====
- Hulk and the Agents of S.M.A.S.H. (Rick Jones/A-Bomb)
- My Little Pony: Friendship Is Magic (Soarin', Jet Set, Mr. Waddle, Thunderlane, Doctor Hooves, Ignenous "Iggy" Rock, Hoops, Caesar, Caramel, Lucky Clover, Comet Tail, Parcel Post, Doctor Hay, Fuzzy Slippers, Persnickety, Geri, Mr. Zippy, Vex, Serenity, Green Daze, Shady Daze)
- Uncle Grandpa (Evil Wizard)
