= Hiroshi Kōjina =

Japanese anime director

- 神志那 弘志
- Born: May 4, 1963 (age 63); Kumamoto, Japan
- Occupations: Semira Anime director, character designer, animator
- Years active: 1981–present

Hiroshi Kōjina (神志那 弘志, Kōjina Hiroshi; born June 4, 1963) is a Japanese animator, character designer, and anime director. His directorial works include Grenadier, Majin Tantei Nōgami Neuro, Kiba, Rainbow - Nisha Rokubō no Shichinin and the 2011 anime adaptation of Hunter × Hunter. He is a member of the Japanese Animation Creators Association. He joined Studio Live in 1982, and following the death of Toyoo Ashida, became the head of the company in 2011.

== Filmography ==
=== Television ===
- Dancouga – Super Beast Machine God (1985) – Character design
- City Hunter '91 (1991) – Character design
- Gulliver Boy (1995) – Character design
- Pluster World (2003–2004) – Character design
- Area 88 (2004) – Character design
- Grenadier (2004–2005) – Director (Debut directorial work)
- Kiba (2006–2007) – Director
- Neuro: Supernatural Detective (2007–2008) – Director
- Rainbow: Nisha Rokubō no Shichinin (2010) – Director
- Hunter × Hunter (second series) (2011–2014) – Director
- The Vampire Dies in No Time (2021–2023) – Director

=== Film ===
- Ryoma! Rebirth: The Prince of Tennis Movie (2021) – Director
- Sand Land (2023) – Direction advisor

=== OVAs/ONAs ===
- Dancouga: Requiem for Victims (1986) – Character design
- Amon: The Darkside of The Devilman (2000) – Character design

=== Video games ===
- Pluster World ~Legendary Plust Gate~ (2003) – Character design
- Pluster World ~Pluston GP~ (2003) – Character design
- Pluster World ~Legendary Plust Gate EX~ (2003) – Character design
