= Jun Fukuyama =

Japanese voice actor (born 1978)

- 福山 潤
- Born: November 26, 1978 (age 47); Fukuyama, Hiroshima, Japan
- Occupations: Voice actor; singer
- Years active: 1997–present
- Agent: BLACK SHIP
- Notable work: Code Geass as Lelouch vi Britannia; Blue Exorcist as Yukio Okumura; The Seven Deadly Sins as King; Love, Chunibyo & Other Delusions as Yuta Togashi; Persona 5 as Joker; Black Clover as Finral Roulacase; Spice and Wolf as Kraft Lawrence; Mr. Osomatsu as Ichimatsu; Assassination Classroom as Koro-sensei; Durarara!! as Shinra Kishitani; Working!! as Souta Takanashi; K as Misaki Yata; Bleach as Yumichika Ayasegawa; xxxHolic as Kimihiro Watanuki; Oresuki as Yasuo "Hose" Hazuki; The Eminence in Shadow as John Smith; Maoyu as Hero; Fire Emblem as Roy; Jewelpet as Dian; Black Butler as Grell Sutcliff; Kuroko's Basketball as Makoto Hanamiya
- Website: fukuyamajun-music.com

Jun Fukuyama (福山 潤, Fukuyama Jun; born November 26, 1978) is a Japanese voice actor and singer. He played Lelouch Lamperouge in Code Geass, Yukio Okumura in Blue Exorcist, Koro-sensei in Assassination Classroom, Ichimatsu in Mr. Osomatsu, Yuta Togashi in Love, Chunibyo & Other Delusions, Kraft Lawrence in Spice and Wolf, Hero in Maoyu, Kimihiro Watanuki in xxxHOLiC, Joker in Persona 5, Riku in Yashahime: Princess Half-Demon, King in The Seven Deadly Sins, Finral in Black Clover and Makoto Hanamiya in Kuroko's Basketball, and Hakuryuu in Inazuma Eleven GO.

== Filmography ==
=== TV animation ===
Year	Title	Role
1998	Himitsu no Hanazono: Kiseki Toiu na no Mahō	Dikon
1998	Guardian Angel Getten	Blackboard Eraser, Man
1998	Yoshimoto Muchikko Monogatari	Ronbū Aria Tsushi
1998	Record of Lodoss War: Chronicles of the Heroic Knight	Dark Elf C
1999	Turn A Gundam	Keith Laijie
2000	Gakkō no Kaidan	Students
2000	Boogiepop Phantom	Masashi Saotome, Manticore Phantom
2000	Invincible King Tri-Zenon	Akira Kamoi
2001	Offside	Ikenaga, Takatsuki, Mamoru Shimamoto
2001	Kidō Tenshi Angelic Layer	Kōtarō Kobayashi
2001	Gekitō! Crush Gear Turbo	Taka
2001	Jungle wa Itsumo Hare Nochi Gū	Harry
2001	Seikai no Senki II	Airport Manager A
2001	Hellsing	Assistant
2001	Yobarete Tobidete! Akubi-chan	Cameraman, Shirōma Student
2002	Crayon Shin-chan	Kyūji Oda
2002	Detective Conan	Kendō Club Staff A
2002	Dragon Drive	G
2002	Duel Masters	Tōru Kamiya
2002	Full Metal Panic!	Shōta Sakamoto, AI, Hiroshi Kasuya
2002	Chōjūshin Gravion	Tōga Tenkūji
2002	Heat Guy J	Ian Nurse
2002	Denkōchō Tokkyū Hikarian	Lightning Tsubasa
2002	Hungry Heart: Wild Striker	Masahiko Shinkawa
2002	Kiddy Grade	Tweedledum
2002	Nintama Rantarō	Miyoshimaru, Mōja, Yakeatotsumutake Ninja, Foot Soldier
2002	Piano: The Melody of a Young Girl's Heart	Kazuya Takahashi
2002	Princess Tutu	Male Student
2002	Tenchi Muyo! GXP	Alan
2002	Tokyo Underground	Crony
2002	Saishū Heiki Kanojo	Ground Staff 1
2002	Witch Hunter Robin	Haruto Sakaki
2003	E's Otherwise	Juma D'Arves Arc
2003	F-Zero: Falcon Densetsu	Tōrukamu
2003	Saiko Robot Conbock (a.k.a. Saiko Robot Konbokku)	Sadoken
2003	Submarine Super 99	Susumu Oki
2003	Di Gi Charat Nyo	Ned, Gunman, Mamonburū
2003	The World of Narue	Masaki Maruo
2003	Nintama Rantarō	Young Samurai
2003	Full Metal Panic? Fumoffu	Issei Tsubaki
2003	Pluster World	Beetma
2003	Mermaid Melody Pichi Pichi Pitch	Kōsuke Sakiya
2003	Yami to Bōshi to Hon no Tabibito	Āya, Narration, Ryūken Kishima
2003	Rockman EXE Axess	SearchMan
2004	Onmyō Taisenki	Riku Tachibana
2004	Gankutsuou: The Count of Monte Cristo	Viscount Albert d'Morcerf
2004	Kyo Kara Maoh!	Rick
2004	Get Ride! AM Driver	Roshette Keith
2004	Samurai Champloo	Foot Soldier
2004	Zoids Fuzors	Glibert
2004	Sore Ike! Zukkoke Sannin Gumi	Shige Tsukuda
2004	W ~Wish~	Junna Tōno
2004	Chōjūshin Gravion Zwei	Tōga Tenkūji
2004	B-Densetsu! Battle B-Daman	Junia
2004	Bleach	Mizuiro Kojima, Yumichika Ayasegawa
2004	Madlax	Ains
2004	Divergence Eve ~Misaki Chronicles~	Kiri Otōto
2004	Yūgo ~Negotiator~	Boy, Soldier 7
2004	Rockman EXE Stream	SearchMan
2005	The Law of Ueki	Anon
2005	Oku-sama wa Joshi Kōsei	Kōhei Iwasaki
2005	Glass no Kamen	Yū Sakurakōji
2005	Karin	Makoto Fujitani
2005	Gunparade Orchestra	Yūto Takeuchi
2005	Cluster Edge	Beryl Jasper
2005	Kōkyōshihen Eureka Seven	Young Norb
2005	Jigoku Shōjo	Gill d'Ronfell
2005	Tsubasa Chronicle	Kimihiro Watanuki
2005	To Heart 2	Takaaki Kōno
2005	Happy Seven ~The TV Manga~	Kikunosuke Kagawa
2005	Blood+	Guy
2005	Full Metal Panic! The Second Raid	Friday (Mao's AI)
2005	Pocket Monsters: Advanced Generation	Tomono
2005	Majime ni Fumajime: Kaiketsu Zorori	Fish Student, Other Zorori Child
2005	Loveless	Yayoi Shioiri
2005	Rockman EXE Beast	SearchMan
2006	Inukami!	Keita Kawahira
2006	Innocent Venus	Chinran
2006	Gakuen Heaven: Boy's Love Hyper	Keita Itō
2006	Kin'iro no Corda ~primo passo~	Keiichi Shimizu
2006	Code Geass: Lelouch of the Rebellion	Lelouch Lamperouge
2006	Shōnen Onmyōji	Toshitsugu Fujiwara
2006	Buso Renkin	Kazuki Mutō
2006	Black Blood Brothers	Zelman Clock
2006	Princess Princess	Tōru Kōno
2006	xxxHOLiC	Kimihiro Watanuki
2006	Rockman EXE Beast+	SearchMan
2007	Ōkiku Furikabutte	Kōsuke Izumi, Hiroyuki Oda
2007	Over Drive	Mel
2007	Kaze no Stigma	Tatsuya Serizawa
2007	KimiKiss pure rouge	Akira Hiiragi
2007	Jūshin Enbu: Hero Tales	Taigatei
2007	Ghost Hound	Masayuki Nakajima
2007	Saint Beast: Kōin Jojishi Tenshi Tan	Chief Priest Pandora
2007	D.Gray-man	Rikei
2007	Hayate no Gotoku!	Puppet Butler
2007	Moonlight Mile	Malik Ali Muhammad
2007	Rental Magica	Itsuki Iba
2007	Okane ga Nai	Yukiya Ayase
2008	Starry Sky	Azusa Kinose
2008	Amatsuki	Tokidoki Rikugō
2008	Vampire Knight	Aidō Hanabusa
2008	Vampire Knight Guilty	Aidō Hanabusa
2008	Spice and Wolf	Kraft Lawrence
2008	Linebarrels of Iron	Hisataka Katō
2008	Code Geass: Lelouch of the Rebellion R2	Lelouch Lamperouge
2008	S.A ~Special A~	Kei Takishima
2008	xxxHOLiC Kei	Kimihiro Watanuki
2008	Macross Frontier	Luca Angeloni
2008	Kuroshitsuji	Grell Sutcliff
2008	Eve no jikan	Rikuo
2008	Hayate the Combat Butler	Puppet Butler
2008	Monochrome Factor	Andrew
2009	Akikan!	Kakeru Daichi
2009	Viper's Creed	Haruki
2009	Sora Kake Girl	Leopard
2009	Hanasakeru Seishōnen	Carl Rosenthal
2009	Valkyria Chronicles	Maximilian
2009	Kin'iro no Corda ~secondo passo~	Keiichi Shimizu
2009	Spice and Wolf II	Kraft Lawrence
2009	Pandora Hearts	Vincent Nightray
2009	07 Ghost	Hakuren Oak
2009	Tegami Bachi	Gauche Suede/Noir
2009	Saki	Kyōtarō Suga
2009	Shangri-La	Shion Imaki
2009	Nyan Koi!	Tama, Haruhiko
2009	Jewelpet	Dian/Andy
2009	Lupin III vs Detective Conan	Gill Cowell Vespaland
2009	Saint Seiya: The Lost Canvas	Kagaho
2010	Densetsu no Yūsha no Densetsu	Ryner Lute
2010	Durarara!!	Shinra Kishitani
2010	Jewelpet Tinkle ☆	Dian
2010	Kobato.	Kimihiro Watanuki
2010	Kuroshitsuji II	Grell Sutcliff
2010	MM!	Taro Sado
2010	Nurarihyon no Mago	Rikuo Nura
2010	Ookiku Furikabutte ~Natsu no Taikai-hen~	Kousuke Izumi
2010	Sekirei: Pure Engagement	Hayoto Mikogami
2010	Star Driver: Kagayaki no Takuto	Shindō Sugata
2010	Tegami Bachi: Reverse	Gauche Suede/Noir
2010	Togainu no Chi	Rin
2010	Uragiri wa Boku no Namae o Shitteiru	Tsukumo Murasame
2010	Working!!	Sōta Takanashi
2011	Ao no Exorcist	Yukio Okumura
2011	Battle Spirits: Heroes	Tegamaru Tanashi
2011	Blood-C	Dog (Kimihiro Watanuki of xxxHolic in disguise)
2011	Crayon Shin-chan	Noel
2011	Deadman Wonderland	Bundō Rokuro
2011	Horizon on the Middle of Nowhere	Tōri Aoi
2011	Itsuka Tenma no Kuro Usagi	Hinata Kurenai
2011	Last Exile: Fam, the Silver Wing	Olan
2011	Nurarihyon no Mago: Sennen Makyou	Rikuo Nura
2011	Nyanpire	Nyatenshi
2011	Phi Brain: Kami no Puzzle	Gammon Sakanoue
2011	Working!!	Sōta Takanashi
2011	Jewelpet Sunshine	Dian, Nejikawa Tetsuo, Coyote, Sun, Alien A
2011	Nichijou	Number 66 soldier, 7th soldier
2011	Maji de Watashi ni Koi Shinasai!	Cookie 2
2012	The Knight in the Area	Suguru Aizawa
2012	Kingdom	Ei Sei
2012	La storia della Arcana Famiglia	Liberta
2012	Shirokuma Café	Panda
2012	Pocket Monsters Best Wishes!	Suwama
2012	Horizon on the Middle of Nowhere II	Tōri Aoi
2012	Hyouka	Jirō Tanabe
2012	Jinrui wa Suitai Shimashita	Assistant
2012	K	Misaki Yata
2012	Natsuyuki Rendezvous	Shimao Atsushi
2012	Magi: The Labyrinth of Magic	Cassim
2012	Love, Chunibyo & Other Delusions	Togashi Yuuta
2012	Ixion Saga DT	Mariandale
2012	Daily Lives of High School Boys	Kyuuseishu, Kiyotaka
2012	Saki-Saki Achiga-hen Episode of Side-A	Suga Kyoutarou
2012	Kira Jewel Pet Deko-tsu!	Senpai, Clef, Housewife C, Dian
2012	The New Prince of Tennis	Oshitari Kenya
2012	Battle Spirits: Sword Eyes	Hagakure Shidou
2012	Phi Brain: Kami no Puzzle 2	Gammon Sakanoue
2013	Cuticle Detective Inaba	Mori Masashi
2013	Genshiken: Second Season	Manabu Kuchiki
2013	Ketsuekigata-kun	Blood Type A
2013	Kingdom 2nd Season	Ei Sei
2013	Jewelpet Happiness	Mori Toshino
2013	Kuroko's Basketball	Makoto Hanamiya
2013	Makai Ouji: Devils and Realist	Kevin
2013	Maoyu	Hero
2013	Mushibugyo	Chou Fukumaru
2013	Nyuru Nyuru!! Kakusen-kun	Kakusenpai
2013	Otona Joshi no Anime Time	Fumio Yamamoto
2013	RDG Red Data Girl	Yukimasa Sagara
2013	Valvrave the Liberator	A-drei
2014	Amagi Brilliant Park	Triken, Genjūrō
2014	Chūnibyō Demo Koi ga Shitai! Ren	Togashi Yuuta
2014	D-Frag!	Ataru Kawahara
2014	Hamatora	Birthday
2014	La Corda d'Oro Blue Sky	Kyoya Kisaragi
2014	The Seven Deadly Sins	King
2014	Nobunaga Concerto	Tokugawa Ieyasu
2014	Noragami	Kazuma
2014	Rail Wars!	Naoto Takayama
2014	Strange+	Takumi
2014	Kuroshitsuji: Book Of Circus	Grell Sutcliff
2014	World Trigger	Karasuma Kyousuke
2015	Ace of Diamond	Masu Shinichirou
2015	Akagami no Shirayukihime	Raji Shenazard
2015	Assassination Classroom	Koro-sensei
2015	Binan Koukou Chikyuu Bouei-bu Love!	Ibushi Arima
2015	Durarara!!x2 Shou	Shinra Kishitani
2015	K: Return of Kings	Misaki Yata
2015	Noragami Aragoto	Kazuma
2015–present	Mr. Osomatsu	Ichimatsu Matsuno
2015	Ranpo Kitan: Game of Laplace	Namikoshi
2015	Working!!	Sōta Takanashi
2015	Yamada-kun to 7-nin no Majo	Haruma Yamazaki
2015	Ore Monogatari!!	Kouki Ichinose
2016	Ajin: Demi-Human	Kō Nakano
2016	Assassination Classroom 2nd Season	Koro-sensei, Reaper
2016	Danganronpa 3: The End of Hope's Peak High School	Teruteru Hanamura
2016	Joker Game	Jitsui
2016	Sekkō Boys	Hermes
2016	Akagami no Shirayukihime 2nd Season	Raji Shenazard
2016	Twin Star Exorcists	Kinako
2016	Haven't You Heard? I'm Sakamoto	Chon Chorizo
2016	The Seven Deadly Sins: Signs of Holy War	King
2016	Yuri on Ice	Takeshi Nishigōri
2016	Bungo Stray Dogs	Ango Sakaguchi
2017	Yowamushi Pedal: New Generation	Komari Kishigami
2017	Boruto: Naruto Next Generations	Toneri Ootsutsuki
2017	Blue Exorcist: Kyoto Saga	Yukio Okumura
2017	Hand Shakers	Break
2017	Fukumenkei Noise	Ayumi Kurose
2017	The Silver Guardian	Riku Suigin
2017	Chronos Ruler	Victo Putin
2017–2021	Black Clover	Finral Roulacase
2018	The Seven Deadly Sins: Revival of the Commandments	King
2018	Yowamushi Pedal: Glory Line	Komari Kishigami
2018–2019	Persona 5: The Animation	Ren Amamiya/Joker
2018	Shinya! Tensai Bakabon	Himself
2018	Inazuma Eleven Ares	Yuuma Nosaka
2018	Grand Blue Dreaming	Captain Kudō
2018	FLCL Progressive	Ide
2018	Banana Fish	Yut-Lung Lee
2018	I'm glad I could keep running	Minato Suyama
2018	Gakuen Basara	Kobayakawa Hideaki
2018	That Time I Got Reincarnated as a Slime	Leon Cromwell
2018	Karakuri Circus	Arlecchino
2018–2019	Pokémon Sun & Moon	Hau
2018	Persona 5 the Animation: Dark Sun...	Ren Amamiya/Joker
2019	W'z	Reijirō
2019	Meiji Tokyo Renka	Gorō Fujita
2019	The Rising of the Shield Hero	L'Arc Berg
2019	Persona 5 the Animation: Stars and Ours	Ren Amamiya/Joker
2019	Midnight Occult Civil Servants	Arata Miyako
2019	7 Seeds	Arashi Aota
2019	Bungo Stray Dogs 3	Ango Sakaguchi
2019	Demon Slayer: Kimetsu no Yaiba	Yahaba
2019	To the Abandoned Sacred Beasts	Christopher (Gargoyle)
2019	O Maidens in Your Savage Season	Tomoaki Yamagishi
2019	The Case Files of Lord El-Melloi II: Rail Zeppelin Grace Note	Doctor Heartless
2019	Ahiru no Sora	Tarō Kabachi
2019	The Seven Deadly Sins: Wrath of the Gods	King
2019	Oresuki	Yasuo "Hose" Hazuki
2020	Breakers	Hayato
2020	Oda Cinnamon Nobunaga	Ota Gyūichi
2020	Food Wars! Shokugeki no Souma: The Fifth Plate	Asahi Nakiri
2020	A Destructive God Sits Next to Me	Seri Koyuki
2020	Kingdom 3rd Season	Ei Sei
2020	Listeners	Jimi Stonefree
2020–present	Yashahime: Princess Half-Demon	Riku
2021	Yo-kai Watch Jam - Yo-kai Academy Y: Close Encounters of the N Kind	Ranto Kirigakure
2021	Horimiya	Akane Yanagi
2021	The Seven Deadly Sins: Dragon's Judgement	King
2021	Vivy: Fluorite Eye's Song	Matsumoto
2021	The Saint's Magic Power is Omnipotent	Kyle Salutania
2021	Shinkansen Henkei Robo Shinkalion Z	SMAT
2021	How a Realist Hero Rebuilt the Kingdom	Castor Vargas
2021	The Vampire Dies in No Time	Draluc
2021	Dragon Goes House-Hunting	Robert
2022	Salaryman's Club	Hayato Kirishima
2022	Heroines Run the Show	Iv
2022	Kingdom 4th Season	Ei Sei
2022	The Yakuza's Guide to Babysitting	Masaya Hayami
2022	Uncle from Another World	Takafumi Takaoka
2022	I'm the Villainess, So I'm Taming the Final Boss	Keith Eigrid
2022	Megaton Musashi 2	Masamune Kusei
2022	Eternal Boys	Haru Asai
2022–present	Bleach: Thousand-Year Blood War	Yumichika Ayasegawa
2022	Love Flops	Yoshio Ijūin
2023	Tsurune: The Linking Shot	Eisuke Nikaidō
2023	Saving 80,000 Gold in Another World for My Retirement	Takeshi Yamano
2023	The Vampire Dies in No Time 2	Draluc
2023	Chibi Godzilla Raids Again	Chibi Godzilla
2023	Opus Colors	Naoki Yamanashi
2023	My Clueless First Friend	Akane's Dad
2023	Ayaka: A Story of Bonds and Wounds	Taihei Makita
2023	Reborn as a Vending Machine, I Now Wander the Dungeon	Boxxo
2023	Liar, Liar	Seiran Kugasaki
2023	The Masterful Cat Is Depressed Again Today	Saku's Father
2023	Ron Kamonohashi's Forbidden Deductions	Omito Kawasemi
2023	My New Boss Is Goofy	Aigo Kinjō
2023	The Eminence in Shadow 2nd Season	John Smith
2023–2024	The Dangers in My Heart	Imaginary Kyotaro
2024	Ishura	Ars the Starrider
2024	Sasaki and Peeps	Prince Adonis
2024	Astro Note	Shoin Ginger
2024	Spice and Wolf: Merchant Meets the Wise Wolf	Kraft Lawrence
2024	Unnamed Memory	Travis
2024	Mission: Yozakura Family	Tsukiyo Hoshifuru
2024	The Strongest Magician in the Demon Lord's Army Was a Human	Ike
2024	Suicide Squad Isekai	Clayface
2024	Wistoria: Wand and Sword	Cariot Instia Wiseman
2024	No Longer Allowed in Another World	Otto
2024	Let This Grieving Soul Retire!	Ark Rodin
2024	A Terrified Teacher at Ghoul School!	Principal
2025	I Want to Escape from Princess Lessons	Clarke
2025	Catch Me at the Ballpark!	Ken Nokogirimiya
2025	Your Forma	Sozon A. Chernov
2025	#Compass 2.0: Combat Providence Analysis System	Pololocho
2025	Witch Watch	Yuzuru Kenmochi
2025	City the Animation	Nobuteru Tekaridake
2025	See You Tomorrow at the Food Court	Duke Abel
2025	Toilet-Bound Hanako-kun Season 2	Shinigami-sama
2025	A Mangaka's Weirdly Wonderful Workplace	Masayuki Toda
2026	Hana-Kimi	Hokuto Umeda
2026	A Gentle Noble's Vacation Recommendation	Studd
2026	The Holy Grail of Eris	Dominic Hamsworth
2026	Dead Account	Ban Ashina
2026	Akane-banashi	Tohru Osaki/Shinta Arakawa
2026	The Klutzy Class Monitor and the Girl with the Short Skirt	Seiichi Tsukishima
2026	Even a Replica Can Fall in Love	Shun Mochizuki
2026	Nippon Sangoku	Yoshitsune Asama
2026	The Frontier Lord Begins with Zero Subjects	Eldan
2026	Hanaori-san Still Wants to Fight in the Next Life	Ryusei Narukami
2026	Ranma ½ Season 3	Sentarō Daimonji
2026	Horror Collector	Jimmy

=== Original video animation (OVA) ===
Year	Title	Role
2001	Usagi-chan de Cue!!	
2002	Shiritsu Araiso Kōtō Gakkō Seitokai Shikkōbu	
2004	Hikari to Mizu no Daphne Tokubetsu-hen 2	Yasuki Jōnōchi
2005	Saikano	Ryōhei
2005	Saint Beast	Chieft Priest Pandora
2005	The Wings of Rean	Asap Suzuki
2006	Mobile Suit Gundam MS IGLOO	Lieutenant Hideto Washiya
2006	Mobile Suit Gundam SEED C.E. 73 Stargazer	Sol Ryūne l'Ange
2006	Cluster Edge Secret Episode	Beryl Jasper
2006	The Prince of Tennis Original Video Animation: Zenkoku Taikai Hen	Kenya Oshitari
2006	The Prince of Tennis Original Video Animation: Zenkoku Taikai hen Semifinal	Kenya Oshitari
2006	The Prince of Tennis Original Video Animation: Zenkoku Taikai Hen Fan Disc White heat Remix	Kenya Oshitari
2006	The Prince of Tennis Original Video Animation: Another Story: Kako to Mirai no Message	Kenya Oshitari
2006	Mitsu×Mitsu Drops	Chihaya Yurioka
2007	Okane ga nai	Yukiya Ayase
2007	OVA To Heart 2	Takaaki Kōno
2007	Code Geass: Lelouch of the Rebellion DVD Magazine 1 & 2	Lelouch Lamperouge
2007	Code Geass: Lelouch of the Rebellion Special Edition ~Black Rebellion~	Lelouch Lamperouge
2008	Clannad – Another World: Tomoyo Chapter	2nd Year Student Council Officer
2008	Switch	Kai Eto
2008	Tegami Bachi Hikari to ao no gensō yawa	Gauche Suede
2008	OVA To Heart 2 ad	Takaaki Kōno
2009	Akikan! OVA	Kakeru Daichi
2009	Shoujo Fight	Mikuni Hiroyujki
2009	Saint Seiya: The Lost Canvas	Bennu Kagaho
2009	Tsubasa Shunraiki	Kimihiro Watanuki
2009	To	Ion
2009	OVA To Heart 2 ad Plus	Takaaki Kōno
2009	xxxHolic: Shunmuki	Kimihiro Watanuki
2010	OVA To Heart 2 ad Next	Takaaki Kōno
2010	xxxHolic: Rou	Kimihiro Watanuki
2010	Mudazumo Naki Kaikaku	Taizō Sugimura
2010	Black Butler:Ciel in Wonderland	Grell Sutcliff
2010	Black Butler:Welcome to the Phantomhives	Grell Sutcliff
2011	Valkyria Chronicles III	Maximillian
2011	Armored Trooper VOTOMS Case;Irvine	Peigan
2011	xxxHolic: Rou Adayume	Kimihiro Watanuki
2011	Black Butler:William The Shinigami	Grell Sutcliff
2012	Code Geass: Akito the Exiled	Julius Kingsley/Lelouch Lamperouge
2016	Persona 5 The Animation: The Day Breakers	Protagonist
2020	Oresuki: Oretachi no Game Set	Yasuo "Hose" Hazuki
2022	The Girl from the Other Side: Siúil, a Rún	Teacher

=== Original net animation (ONA) ===
Year	Title	Role
2016	Pokémon Generations	Blue
2019	7 Seeds	Arashi Aota
2020	Oblivion Battery	Tarō Yamada
2020	MILGRAM	Jackalope
2021	Cute Executive Officer	TV Director
2021	High-Rise Invasion	Mamoru Aikawa
2023	Bastard!! -Heavy Metal Dark Fantasy- Second Season	McAlpine Toni Strauss
2023	Ōoku: The Inner Chambers	Sutezō
2024	Code Geass: Rozé of the Recapture	Lelouch Lamperouge/L.L.

=== Tokusatsu ===
Year	Title	Role
2014–15	Ressha Sentai ToQger	Baron Nero
2014	Ressha Sentai ToQger the Movie: Galaxy Line S.O.S.	Baron Nero
2015	Ressha Sentai ToQger vs. Kyoryuger: The Movie	Baron Nero
2015	Ultraman Ginga S The Movie	Ultraman Mebius
2015	They Went and Came Back Again Ressha Sentai ToQGer: Super ToQ 7gou of Dreams	Baron Nero
2016	Shuriken Sentai Ninninger vs. ToQger the Movie: Ninja in Wonderland	Kirigakure Nero Saizō
2026	Kamen Rider ZEZTZ	Punish Gore Nightmare

=== Anime films ===
Year	Title	Role
	Aruvu Rezuru: Kikaijikake no Yōseitachi	Remu Mikage
	Bleach: Memories of Nobody	Yumichika Ayasegawa
	Bleach: The DiamondDust Rebellion	Yumichika Ayasegawa
	Cyborg 009 Vs. Devilman	Joe Shimamura/009
	Gekijōban Meiji Tokyo Renka: Yumihari no Serenade	Gorō Fujita
	Gekitō! Crush Gear Turbo: Kaizerburn no Chōsen	Gea Emperor, Jake Grandstein
	Glass no Usagi	Yukio Ei
	Heart no Kuni no Alice	Tweedle Dee / Tweedle Dum
	Hurdle	Utanosuke Ōsaki
	Inazuma Eleven GO the Movie: The Ultimate Bonds Gryphon	Hakuryuu
	Inukami The Movie: Tokumei Reiteki Sōsakan Karina Shirō	Keita Kawahira
	K: Missing Kings	Yata Misaki
	Kiddy Grade -Ignition- First Volume	Tweedledum
	Kiddy Grade -Maelstrom- Second Volume	Tweedledum
	Kiddy Grade -Truth Dawn- Third Volume	Tweedledum
	Gundam the Ride	Jack Beard
	Gundam Shin Taiken −0087- Green Drivers	Pilot of GM II
	Mobile Suit Gundam (special edition)	Marker Clan
	Mobile Suit Gundam II: Senshi-hen	Marker Clan
	Mobile Suit Gundam III: Meguriai Uchū-hen	Marker Clan
	Turn A Gundam I Chikyū-kō	Keith Laijie
	Turn A Gundam II Gekkō-chō	Keith Laijie
	Gensomaiden Saiyuki: Requiem	Young Gō Dōgan
	Shamu Neku: First Mission	Terrorist
	The Last: Naruto the Movie	Toneri Ōtsutsuki
	xxxHOLiC the Movie: Manatsu no Yoru no Yume	Kimihiro Watanuki
2016	Ajin Part 2: Shōtotsu	Kō Nakano
2017	Black Butler: Book of the Atlantic	Grell Sutcliff
2018	Bungo Stray Dogs: DEAD APPLE	Ango Sakaguchi
2018	K: Seven Stories	Misaki Yata
2018	Love, Chunibyo & Other Delusions! Take on Me	Yūta Togashi
2018	The Seven Deadly Sins the Movie: Prisoners of the Sky	King
2019	Code Geass: Lelouch of the Re;surrection	Lelouch Lamperouge
2019	Mr. Osomatsu: The Movie	Ichimatsu
2019	Laidbackers	Ron
2019	Human Lost	Takeichi
2021	The Seven Deadly Sins: Cursed by Light	King
2022	Mr. Osomatsu: Hipipo-Zoku to Kagayaku Kajitsu	Ichimatsu
2022	The Seven Deadly Sins: Grudge of Edinburgh	King
2023	Black Clover: Sword of the Wizard King	Finral Roulacase
2023	Rakudai Majo: Fūka to Yami no Majo	Abel
2023	Hokkyoku Hyakkaten no Concierge-san	Head Cook
2024	Mobile Suit Gundam SEED Freedom	Albert Heinlein
2024	Mononoke the Movie: Phantom in the Rain	Hiramoto
2024	Fuuto PI: The Portrait of Kamen Rider Skull	Nagi Ōshima
2025	Cute High Earth Defense Club Eternal Love!	Ibushi Arima
2025	Whoever Steals This Book	Mysterious Man

=== Video games ===
Year	Title	Role
2001	Super Smash Bros. Melee	Roy
2010	Another Century's Episode: R	Lelouch Lamperouge/Zero, Luca Angelloni
2011	7th Dragon 2020	
2011	Another Century's Episode Portable	Lelouch Lamperouge/Zero, Luca Angelloni
2013	Chain Chronicle	Various
2013	God Eater 2	Emil Von Strasbourg
2014	Super Hero Generation	Ultraman Mebius
2014	Granblue Fantasy	Feower, Joker, Lelouch Lamperouge
2015	Super Smash Bros. for Nintendo 3DS and Wii U	Roy
	Bleach: Brave Souls	Yumichika Ayasegawa
2016	Persona 5	Joker, Arsene, Persona awakening voice
2017	Fire Emblem Heroes	Roy, Innes
2017	Nioh	Ii Naomasa
2018	#COMPASS	Venus Pororotcho
2018	Assassin's Creed Origins	Bayek (Japanese voice over)
2018	Super Smash Bros. Ultimate	Joker (Japanese voice), Roy (Japanese voice) ^{a}
2018	Dragalia Lost	Ieyasu, Joker
2018	Food Fantasy	Red Wine, Raindrop Cake, Spaghetti
2018	Fate/Grand Order	Qin Shi Huang
2018	MapleStory	Ark
2018	Code Geass Hangyaku no Lelouch	Lelouch Lamperouge
2018	Code Geass R2: Banjou no Geass Gekijou	Lelouch Lamperouge
2018	Code Geass: Lost Colors	Lelouch Lamperouge
2018	Dissidia: Final Fantasy	Onion Knight
2018	Dissidia 012: Final Fantasy	Onion Knight
2018	Duel Love	Yuma Asakura
2018	Final Fantasy Type-0	Concordian King
2018	Final Fantasy Type-0 HD	Concordian King
2018	G Senjō no Maō	Maō
2018	Gakuen Heaven	Itou Keita
2018	Gakuen Heaven Okawari!	Itou Keita
2018	Genso Suikoden: Tsumugareshi Hyakunen no Toki	Zeno
2018	Granado Espada	Vincent Rio (Japanese Version)
2018	Grandia Online	Human Male
2018	Heart no Kuni no Alice	Tweedle Dee, Tweedle Dum
2018	Kiniro no Corda	Shimizu Keichi (Japanese Version)
2018	Kiniro no Corda 2	Shimizu Keichi (Japanese Version)
2018	Kiniro no Corda 2: Encore	Shimizu Keichi (Japanese Version)
2018	Kiniro no Corda 2: Forte	Shimizu Keichi (Japanese Version)
2018	Kiniro no Corda 3	Kisaragi Kyoya (Japanese Version)
2018	Kiniro no Corda 4	Kisaragi Kyoya (Japanese Version)
2018	La storia della Arcana Famiglia	Liberta
2018	Luminous Arc 2: Will	Steiner
2018	Maji de Watashi ni Koi Shinasai!	Cookie 2
2018	MagnaCarta II	Juto
2018	Metal Gear Solid 4: Guns of the Patriots	Johnny "Akiba" Sasaki
2018	Metal Gear Solid: Portable Ops	Null
2018	Onmyōji	Ibaraki-dōji, Rikuo Nura
2018	Phantasy Star Portable 2	Shizuru
2018	Princess Princess	Toru Kono
2018	Spice & Wolf	Kraft Lawrence
2018	Star Ocean: First Departure	Ioshua Jerand
2018	Starry Sky: in Summer	Azusa Kinose
2018	Summon Night X: Tears Crown	Dylan Will Delteana, Radius
2018	Super Danganronpa 2: Farewell Despair Academy	Teruteru Hanamura
2018	Super Robot Wars	Lelouch Lamperouge/Zero, Luca Angeloni, Asap Suzuki, Hisataka Katou
2018	Tales of Destiny 2	Kyle Dunamis
2018	Tales of the World: Narikiri Dungeon 3	Kyle Dunamis
2018	Tales of the World: Radiant Mythology 2	Kyle Dunamis
2018	Tales of the World: Radiant Mythology 3	Kyle Dunamis
2018	Togainu no Chi	Rin
2018	Togainu no Chi True Blood	Rin
2018	Valkyria Chronicles	Maximilian
2018	Vampire Knight	Aidou Hanabusa
2018	xxxHolic	Watanuki Kimihiro
2019	Another Eden	Joker
2019	Dragon Raja	Chisei Gen
2019	Edge of Awakening	Sengin
2019	The Seven Deadly Sins: Grand Cross	King
2019	Homestar VR Special Edition	Narrator
2019	Punishing: Gray Raven	Kamui, Camu
13 Sentinels: Aegis Rim	Renya Gouto	
2020	No Straight Roads	Zuke (Japanese voice over)
2020	Persona 5 Strikers	Joker
2021	The King of Fighters All Star	King
2021	The Legend of Heroes: Trails Through Daybreak	Rene Kincaid (Japanese voice over)
2021	Tears of Themis	Vyn Richter
2021	Rune Factory 5	Martin
2021	Cookie Run: Kingdom	Madeleine Cookie
2021	Counter:Side	Akiyama Shiryu(Joo Shiyoon)
2021	Tokimeki Memorial Girl's Side 4th Heart	Hiiragi Yanosuke
2022	The Diofield Chronicle	Iscarion Colchester
2022	The Legend of Heroes: Trails Through Daybreak II	Rene Kincaid (Japanese voice over)
2023	Fire Emblem Engage	Roy
2023	Persona 5 Tactica	Joker
2024	Identity V	Mike Morton/Acrobat
	Strinova	Nobunaga (Japanese Version)
2025	Atelier Yumia: The Alchemist of Memories & the Envisioned Land	Rutger Arendt
2025	Zenless Zone Zero	Hugo Vlad
2025	Ghost of Yōtei	Kitsune
2026	Dissidia Duellum Final Fantasy	Onion Knight
2027	Atelier Karia: The Night Kingdom & the Guide of Memories	Rutger Arendt

^a The Japanese vocal tracks for these characters also appear in the Chinese and Korean versions of the game.

=== Drama CDs ===
Year	Title	Role
	07 Ghost	Hakuren Oak
	Adekan	Yoshiwara Shiro
	Anata go Ofuro de Noboseru	Arima
	Ao no Exorcist	Okumura Yukio
	Appendix of Shukan Soine	
	Are you Alice?	March Hare
	Bokura no Kiseki	Harusumi Minami
	Disney Date	
	Doki Doki Onsen Tsuā	Arima
	Dolls	Tamao Hasui
	Fushigi Yūgi Genbu Kaiden	Shigi
	Fruits Basket	Naohito
	Barajou no Kiss	Seiran Asagi
	Halloween+Town Sweet Voice Collection	Uryuu Minami
	Hana awase karakuri	
	Heart no Kuni no Alice	Tweedledum
	Hitomi o Sumashite	"Makino Touwa"
	Hokago wa Mystery to Tomo ni	
	Horitsuba Gakuen	Kimihiro Watanuki
	Issho ni Gohan	Unoha Nao
	Ixion Saga DT	Mariandale
	K	Yata Misaki
	Kimi to Naisho no... Kyo Kara Kareshi	Minami Chitose
	Kin'iro no Corda	Shimizu Keiichi
	Koi Koi	Shimodzuki
	La storia della Arcana Famiglia	Liberta
	Meikoi Onsei Gekijou Koi	
	Meji Tokyo Renka	Fujita Gorou
	Meisaku Bungaku'' (Warai): Ant and the Grasshopper: Ant and the Grasshopper	Grasshopper
	MeruPuri	Hirata Ayashi
	Miracle Train Escort Voice	
	Moegaku: Moe Koi Gakuen Seitoki Shikōbu	
	Momogure Jūgoshōnenhyōryūki: Ni-nenkan no Natsuyasumi	
	Persona 5: The Night Breakers	Protagonist
	Requiem et Reminiscence	Ryuichi Asakura
	S.L.H Stray Love Hearts!	Hijiri Asukai
	Special A	Kei Takishima
	Shiki	Yuuki Natsuno
	Shirokuma Café	Panda
	Shukan Soine vol.11	Touma
	Starry Sky	Azusa Kinose
	Suikoden II	Luc
	Suit wo Nuida Ato	Takato Fukuyama
	Tiara Ai no Poem Tsuki Kotobazeme	
	Vampire Knight	Aidou Hanabusa
	xxxHolic	Kimihiro Watanuki
	Yuri Danshi	Hanatera Keisuke

=== Live-action films ===
Year	Title	Role	Notes
2009	My Girlfriend's a Geek	Himself	
2018	Ani Tomo	Haginosuke Tachibana	
2021	The Woman of S.R.I. the Movie	News reporter	
2022	Mr. Osomatsu	Ichimatsu (voice)	

=== Dubbing ===
Title	Role
Alice Upside Down	Lester McKinley (Lucas Grabeel)
All Saints Street	Ira
Ants in the Pants	Dirk (Tom Lass)
The Bumblebee Flies Anyway	Mike (Adam LaVorgna)
But I'm a Cheerleader	Andre (Douglas Spain)
City on a Hill	James "Jimmy" Ryan (Mark O'Brien)
College Road Trip	Scooter (Lucas Grabeel)
Crazy in Alabama	Wiley (David Speck)
Crisis on Earth-X	Barry Allen / Flash (Grant Gustin)
Endless Love	David Axelrod (Martin Hewitt)
The Fate of the Furious	Fernando (Janmarco Santiago)
Five Nights at Freddy's	Mike Schmidt (Josh Hutcherson)
The Flash	Barry Allen / Flash (Grant Gustin)
Game of Thrones	Bran Stark (Isaac Hempstead Wright)
Gameoverse	Flappers (Arin Hanson)
Godzilla x Kong: The New Empire	Wilcox (Tim Carroll)
Harry Potter and the Half-Blood Prince	Tom Riddle (teenager) (Frank Dillane)
Harry Potter and the Deathly Hallows	Tom Riddle (teenager) (Frank Dillane)
High School Musical	Ryan Evans (Lucas Grabeel)
High School Musical 2	Ryan Evans (Lucas Grabeel)
High School Musical 3: Senior Year	Ryan Evans (Lucas Grabeel)
It Follows	Greg Hannigan (Daniel Zovatto)
The Karate Kid	Bobby Brown (Ron Thomas)
Kim Su-ro, The Iron King	Young Ijinashi (Won Deok-hyun)
Knock at the Cabin	Eric (Jonathan Groff)
Kung Fu Yoga	Xiao Guang (Lay)
The Little Vampire	Gregory Sackville-Bagg (Dean Cook)
My Country: The New Age	Seo Hwi (Yang Se-jong)
Pawn Sacrifice	Bobby Fischer (Tobey Maguire)
Pee Mak	Shin (Wiwat Kongrasri)
The Roundup: Punishment	Chang Dong-cheol (Lee Dong-hwi)
Skipped Parts	Sam Callahan (Bug Hall)
Tears of the Black Tiger	Young Dum
The Texas Chainsaw Massacre 2	Buzz
There's Only One Jimmy Grimble	The Cat (Charles Denton)
Thirteen Days	Kenny O'Donnell, Jr. (Jon Foster)
Ticket to Paradise	Gede May (Maxime Bouttier)
Toy Story 3	Jack-in-the-Box
U-571	Seaman Ted "Trigger" Fitzgerald (Tom Guiry)
Wild Things	Jimmy Leach (Cory Pendergast)
The Wolf's Call	Chanteraide/"Socks" (François Civil)
Young Detective Dee: Rise of the Sea Dragon	Yuan Zhen (Kim Bum)
Zoey's Extraordinary Playlist	Max (Skylar Astin)

== Discography ==
=== Jun Fukuyama Persona Show ===
	発売日	タイトル	規格品番	
	発売日	タイトル	BD	DVD
きゃにめ版	21 February 2018	福山潤・ひとりのBocchi Show	SCXP.00023	SCBP.00031
一般流通版	21 February 2018	福山潤・ひとりのBocchi Show	PCXP.50543	PCBP.53503

=== PONY CANYON ===
歌	発売日	タイトル	規格品番			オリコン最高位
歌	発売日	タイトル	初回限定盤	通常盤	きゃにめ限定盤	オリコン最高位
Album	21 June 2017	OWL	PCCG.1608	PCCG.1609	SCCG.22	6位
Single	15 February 2017	KEEP GOING ON!	PCCG-01577	PCCG-01578	SCCG-00016	6位

=== FlyingDog ===
Year	Title
2009	Romanteki Sekai 31 (浪漫的世界31; lit. 'Romantic World 31'): Released: November 26, 2009; Label: FlyingDog; Track Listing: No. / Title / Length; 1. / "Ki ni Naru Atsu wa Poncho-nu" (気になるアイツはポンチョ〜ヌ) / 4:03; 2. / "Kokoro wa Kimi no Kage ni Nariniki" (心はキミの影になりにき) / 4:36; 3. / "Omoi no Tsuzuri" (想いのツヅリ (朗読)) / 2:40; 4. / "Seinaru Yoru ni: With you" (聖なる夜に〜with you, lit. "A Holy Night: With you") / 3:32; 5. / "Gomi Shūshūsha no Uta: Watashi no Yojōhan Live" (ゴミ収集車の唄〜私の四畳半ライブ, lit. "Garbage Truck Song") / 4:40; 6. / "Espresso" (エスプレッソ (朗読)); 7. / "Datte Boku wa Ame Otoko" (だって僕は雨男, lit. "The Beginning Room") / 5:56; 8. / "Jitensha to Clover" (自転車とクローバー, lit/ "Bicycle and Clover") / 4:27; 9. / "Love Letters: Minami no Machi Yori" (Love Letters 〜南の街より (声: 福山潤)+荒野/+海/+to do list/+カーニバル/+アマゾン河) / 0:36; 10. / "Oyasumi" (おやすみ, lit. "Oyasumi") / 3:28
2010	Love Letters 2: Paris-shi Romanti-ku (Love Letters 2 〜パリ市ロマンチッ区; lit. 'Love Letters 2 ~ Paris Romantic'): Released: July 21, 2010; Label: FlyingDog; Track Listing: No. / Title / Length; 1. / "Prologue" (プロローグ) / 1:39; 2. / "Yōkina Gyaruson" (陽気なギャルソン) / 3:39; 3. / "Chikatetsu no Maru" (地下鉄のマル) / 2:21; 4. / "@Cafe" / 1:08; 5. / "Dali" / 2:19; 6. / "Furuhonichi no Ossan" (古本市のおっさん) / 1:03; 7. / "Sore demo Seine wa Nagareru" (それでもセーヌは流れる) / 2:48; 8. / "Pernod" (ペルノー) / 2:26; 9. / "@Ste-Chapelle" / 0:47; 10. / "Hige no marionetto" (ヒゲのマリオネット) / 4:37; 11. / "Avignon no Hashi no ue de" (アビニョンの橋の上で, lit. "On the bridge of Avignon") / 1:13; 12. / "Kanshansha kara" (観覧車から) / 4:19; 13. / "Merry-Go-Round" (メリーゴーランド) / 1:35
2011	Ai o Utau! (愛を歌う!): Released: May 25, 2011; Label: FlyingDog; Track Listing: No. / Title / Length; 1. / "Premium Love Song" (プレミアム LOVE SONG) / 4:59; 2. / "Program Me!" / 6:04; 3. / "Sayonara Koi no Uta" (サヨナラの恋の歌, lit. "Goodbye Love Song") / 5:37; 4. / "Another Kiss" / 5:00; 5. / "Ai wa Katsu" (愛は勝つ) / 3:50; 6. / "Kimi ni Arigatō" (君にありがとう (Bonus Track)) / 4:22
2013	Love Letters 3: Matsuri no Kuni de (Love Letters 3 ~祭りのくにで): Released: May 22, 2013; Label: FlyingDog; Track Listing: No. / Title / Length; 1. / "Prologue" (プロローグ); 2. / "<Oupuningu Teima> Mekakushi no Shinjitsu (Short Version)" (＜オープニングテーマ＞ 目隠しの真実(Short Version）); 3. / "Sōgū" (遭遇); 4. / "Saikai" (再会); 5. / "Saiten" (祭典); 6. / "Kyūkaku" (嗅覚); 7. / "Shikaku" (視覚); 8. / "Mikaku" (味覚); 9. / "Chōkaku" (聴覚); 10. / "Shokkaku" (触覚); 11. / "Epilogue" (エピローグ); 12. / "Toraberinman" (<エンディングテーマ＞ トラベリンマン); 13. / "Mekakushi no Shinjitsu" (＜オープニングテーマ＞ 目隠しの真実); 14. / "Ki ni Naru Aitsu wa Poncho-nu Ondo" (＜挿入歌＞ 気になるアイツはポンチョ～ヌ音頭)
