= No Money =

No Money may refer to:

- No Money (manga), yaoi novel and manga
- No Money (song), 2016 house song by Galantis
- "No Money", song by Kings of Leon from Come Around Sundown (2010)
- No Money, EP by The Dugites (1970)

== See also ==
- Poverty
- No Money Enterprise, an Australian drill group
