= Ayase =

Ayase may refer to:

== Places ==
- Ayase, Kanagawa, Japan
- Ayase, an area in Adachi, Tokyo, Japan
  - Ayase Station, train station in Adachi, Tokyo

== People ==
- Ayase (music producer) (born 1994), Japanese Vocaloid producer and songwriter
- Haruka Ayase (綾瀬 はるか; born 1985), Japanese actress
- Ayase Ueda (上田 綺世; born 1998), Japanese footballer

== Characters ==
- Megumi Ayase, a character from Creamy Mami, the Magic Angel
- Momo Ayase, main character from Dandadan
- Yue Ayase, a character from Negima!?
- Yukiya Ayase, a Yaoi uke character from No Money
- Ayase Ayatsuji, a character from Chivalry of a Failed Knight
- Ayase Aragaki, a character from Oreimo
- Eli Ayase, a character from Love Live!
- Chihaya Ayase, the main character from Chihayafuru
- Hanabi Ayase, a character from Age 12
- Ayase Shinomiya, a character from Guilty Crown
