= The Vampire Dies in No Time =

Japanese manga series

- First tankōbon volume cover

吸血鬼すぐ死ぬ (Kyūketsuki Sugu Shinu)
- Genre: Comedy; Supernatural
- Manga
- Written by: Itaru Bonnoki
- Published by: Akita Shoten
- English publisher: NA: Orange Inc.
- Imprint: Shōnen Champion Comics
- Magazine: Weekly Shōnen Champion
- Original run: June 25, 2015 – present
- Volumes: 26
- Anime television series
- Directed by: Hiroshi Kōjina
- Written by: Yukie Sugawara
- Music by: Ryō Takahashi
- Studio: Madhouse
- Licensed by: Crunchyroll: SEA: Plus Media Networks Asia (from season 2)
- Original network: Tokyo MX, BS11, tvk, KBS Kyoto, SUN
- English network: US: Crunchyroll Channel
- Original run: October 4, 2021 – March 27, 2023
- Episodes: 24
- icon

The Vampire Dies in No Time (Japanese: 吸血鬼すぐ死ぬ, Hepburn: Kyūketsuki Sugu Shinu) is a Japanese manga series by Itaru Bonnoki. It has been serialized in Akita Shoten's shōnen manga magazine Weekly Shōnen Champion since June 2015 and has been collected in twenty-six tankōbon volumes. An anime television series adaptation produced by Madhouse aired from October to December 2021. A second season aired from January to March 2023.

== Story ==
=== Setting ===
The series takes place in a world where vampires are very real. There are inferior vampires, which are basically animals, and vampire lords, who have human-like physiques and intelligence. All vampire lords have basic vampire abilities and weaknesses, but some of them have special abilities that set them apart from the rest of their kind. They can also find regular animals to make into their immortal familiars.

Some vampires choose to live in peace with humans while others choose to be menaces instead. Thus, some humans take up the role as vampire hunters to keep the hostile vampires in check.

=== Plot ===
The story follows the famed vampire hunter, Ronaldo, who receives a job to destroy the supposedly invincible vampire lord Draluc and rescue a human boy he allegedly kidnapped. Upon meeting him in his mansion, however, he quickly realizes that he is only called "invincible" because of his unique ability to revive almost instantly after being reduced to ashes, which is convenient since almost anything can kill him due to him being incredibly weak. The boy who was believed to be a hostage just sneaks into the castle regularly to play Draluc's huge collection of video games. Chaos ensues and Draluc's castle ends up completely destroyed as a result.

Homeless, Draluc then moves into Ronaldo's apartment for the time being, much to Ronaldo's chagrin. He also brings along his familiar, a cute armadillo named John, who Ronaldo becomes fond of. After helping Ronaldo in a case, the two become unofficial partners, often clashing with other vampires and hunters alike.

== Characters ==
=== The Ronaldo Vampire Hunter Agency ===
Ronaldo (ロナルド, Ronarudo)
Voiced by: Makoto Furukawa (Japanese); Ian Sinclair (English)
A vampire hunter in his 20s with a base of operations in Shin-Yokohama. Originally not thrilled to have Draluc as a roommate, the success of the partnership in his novel series, The Ronaldo Chronicles, leads him to reluctantly put up with the vampire. He frequently kills Draluc when annoyed. He also has an extreme phobia of celery. In a character interview, he mentions 'Ronaldo' is a nickname he gained in high school. Due to the reading of his name in Japanese, he is sometimes referred to as "Ronald.'
Draluc (ドラルク, Doraruku)
Voiced by: Jun Fukuyama (Japanese); Frank Todaro (English)
A 208 year old Romanian-Japanese vampire from Transylvania. He enjoys video games and teasing Ronaldo, he has common sense in most situations, and gentlemanly towards women. As Ronaldo's roommate, he takes responsibility for cleaning and cooking, the latter being one of his talents (much to Ronaldo's chagrin). He frequently dies and turns to dust, but being an immortal, he can reconstitute himself quickly - provided his remains aren't interfered with.
John (ジョン, Jon)
Voiced by: Mutsumi Tamura (Japanese); Ellie Dritch (English)
A three-banded armadillo from South America and Draluc's familiar. He is loved and adored by all. He is known to say "nu."

=== Vampire Control Division ===
Hinaichi (ヒナイチ)
Voiced by: Natsumi Hioka (Japanese); Alicyn Packard (English)
An officer from the Vampire Control Division. At 19 years old, she's the youngest Vice Captain in the Division's history. She wields dual blades while on duty. While she presents as firm and strict, she's easily flustered. She loves Draluc's cooking, especially his cookies.
Tо̄ Handa (半田 桃, Handa Tō)
Voiced by: Yoshitsugu Matsuoka (Japanese); Anthony DiMascio (English)
Hinaichi's subordinate. A dhampir and former high school classmate of Ronaldo's. As a mama's boy, he hates that his vampire mother is a fan of Ronaldo's books and seeks to show her a less desirable side of the hunter. His hatred borders on obsession, his room decorated with Ronaldo posters and merchandise.
Hiyoshi (ヒヨシ)
Voiced by: Daisuke Ono (Japanese); Ben Bryant (English)
The captain of the Vampire Control Division and Ronaldo's older brother. He used to be a hunter.
Sagyō (サギョウ)
Voiced by: Koutaro Nishiyama (Japanese); Dalton Walker (English)
One of the newer Vamp Control officers. He takes his job rather seriously.
Kantarō Kei (ケイ・カンタロウ, Kei Kantarō)
Voiced by: Seiichiro Yamashita
A member of Vamp Control, not debuted fully until later in the series.

=== Vampire Hunters' Guild ===
Satetsu (サテツ)
Voiced by: Yoshimasa Hosoya (Japanese); Alan Adelberg (English)
A vampire hunter from Ronaldo's guild with metal armor on his left arm. A reformed delinquent, he keeps his composure under most situations but his past will surface if he's angered.
Shot (ショット, Shotto)
Voiced by: Atsushi Tamaru (Japanese); Blake McNamara (English)
Another hunter from Ronaldo's guild. He has a fetish for girls with body hair. He wears a vaguely American Southwestern style outfit.
Maria (マリア)
Voiced by: Yōko Hikasa (Japanese); Emily Fajardo (English)
A busty hunter dressed as a nun from Ronaldo's guild whose main job is being a Matagi, hunting bears.
Ta Chan (ター・チャン, Tā Chan)
Voiced by: Kaori Ishihara (Japanese); Kristi Rothrock (English)
A petite girl who works as hunter from Ronaldo's guild, wearing an outfit resembling a cheongsam. She's blunt and straightforward, known for her specific and personal insults.
Senya Siriski (シーニャ・シリスキー, Shīnya Shirisukī)
Voiced by: Masaya Onosaka (Japanese); Adin Rudd (English)
A Vampire Trainer who uses bondage to train and control inferior vampires.
Gо̄setsu "Master" (ゴウセツ / マスター, Gōsetsu / Masutā)
Voiced by: Tetsu Inada (Japanese); Gabe Kunda (English)
A former vampire hunter who now serves as the guild's bartender. He receives and assigns jobs given to the guild.
Koyuki (コユキ)
Voiced by: Yūki Takada (Japanese); Apphia Yu (English)
Gosetsu's daughter. She works as a barmaid.
Vamone (ヴァモネ)
A duck-themed vampire hunter. He's very popular.
Homerun Batter (ホームランバッター, Hōmuran Battā)
Voiced by: Hironori Shiojiri (Japanese); Jacob Hopkins (English)
A baseball-themed vampire hunter.
Medoki (メドキ) and Shōka (ショーカ)
Voiced by: Kōdai Sakai (Medoki), Junji Majima (Shoka) (Japanese); Stephen Fu (Medoki), Christopher Wehkamp (Shoka) (English)
Two other hunters from the guild.
Mikazuki (ミカヅキ)
Voiced by: Ayumu Murase
A dhampir who seeks to exterminate vampires.

=== Vampires ===
Nudenium (ゼンラニウム, Zenraniumu)
Voiced by: Akio Ōtsuka (Japanese); John Stimac (English)
A mostly nude vampire whose groin is censored by a cluster of geraniums. He has control over plants and anyone he feeds a seed to.
Tsujigiri Nagiri (辻斬りナギリ)
Voiced by: Toshihiko Seki (Japanese); Christopher R. Sabat (English)
A former serial killer vampire who since entering Shin-Yokohama is a pathetic shell of his former self. He hardens his blood into blades, usually produced from the palm of his hands.
Odd Creature (へんな動物, Henna Dōbutsu)
Voiced by: Yasuhiro Takato (Japanese); Anthony Bowling (English)
Real name: Odd Von Creature (フォン・ナ・ドゥーブツ Fon na doubutsu). A perverted vampire with little control over his transformation power due to constantly thinking lewd thoughts. His true form is a handsome blond vampire which he can only achieve once he's satisfied or seriously turned off.
Bosatsu (ボサツ)
Voiced by: Ryūsei Nakao (Japanese); Jeremy Inman (English)
A vampire cat now under the ownership of Fukuma.
Adam (アダム, Adamu)
Voiced by: Tomohiro Omachi (Japanese); Austin Tindle (English)
A handsome vampire who while attempting to flirt with another girl, caught the attention of Maremi instead. Not wanting her advances, he kept trying to run away from her to no avail until she saved his life, after which he turned her out of gratitude.
Maremi Gekkōin (月光院 希美, Gekkōin Maremi)
Voiced by: Kana Hanazawa (Japanese); Morgan Garrett (English)
Formerly a human, now a vampire known as the Empress. She mistook Adam's flirting with her friend to be for her and began stalking him, happy to let him bite her. After awakening as a vampire she became extremely powerful, suggesting she was always meant to be a vampire. Adam bit her after she pushed him out of traffic in order to save his life.
Mister Lewd Talk (Y談おじさん, Ydan Ojisan)
Voiced by: Kazuhiko Inoue (Japanese); Mick Wingert (English)
A middle-aged looking vampire who uses his hypnosis power to make people speak their secret fetishes. An old acquaintance of Draus.
Yakyūken Lover (野球拳大好き, Yakyūken Daisuki)
Voiced by: Shigeru Chiba (Japanese); Brendan Blaber (English)
A vampire who loves yakyūken that will sequester his opponent in an impenetrable barrier to play. The loser loses their clothes. His real name is Ken (ケン).
Micro Bikini (マイクロビキニ, Maikuro Bikini)
Voiced by: Hiroki Yasumoto (Japanese); Christopher Guerrero (English)
A vampire who draws his power from the micro bikini he wears. Anyone he bites dons a micro bikini and is under his control. He is the younger brother of Yakyūken Lover. His real name is Michaela (ミカエラ, Mikaera).
Transparent Lower Body (下半身透明, Kahanshin Tōmei)
Voiced by: Nobunaga Shimazaki
A ghostly vampire with the ability to make his lower body transparent. He is the youngest brother of Yakyūken Lover and Micro Bikini.
Etiquette Breacher (マナー違反, Manā Ihan)
Voiced by: Soma Saito (Japanese); James Cheek (English)
A vampire who controls ghouls to breach social etiquette and acts as a public nuisance. His real name is Manabu.
Passionate Kiss (熱烈キッス, Netsuretsu Kissu)
Voiced by: Misa Kobayashi (Japanese); Kathryn Rose Taylor (English)
An bizarrely shaped vampire with three sets of lips who targets young, handsome men and sucks blood through kisses. Her real name is Francesca Hanasaku (花咲 フランチェスカ, Hanasaku Furanchesuka).
Aranea (アラネア)
Voiced by: Sumire Uesaka (Japanese); Alexis Tipton (English)
A spider-themed vampire.
Draus (ドラウス, Dorausu)
Voiced by: Sho Hayami (Japanese); Mike Pollock (English)
Draluc's father. A Romanian native vampire. He worries often for his weak son, but is glad he's doing well in Shin-Yokohama. His Father, the Progenitor (御真祖様), is the head of the Dragon Clan and implied to be Dracula himself.
Gorgona (ゴルゴナ, Gorugona)
Voiced by: Yuki Kodaira (Japanese); Natalie Van Sistine (English)
Draluc's aunt and Draus' sister-in-law. She's quite interested in Ronaldo's pole dancing.
Ura Shin Yokohama
Voiced by: Hōchū Ōtsuka
Anti-Aging
Voiced by: Kenichi Ogata

=== Autumn Books ===
Fukuma (フクマ)
Voiced by: Shun'ichi Toki (Japanese); Aaron Landon (English)
Ronaldo's editor from Autumn Books. A terrifyingly calm man who wields a battleaxe, as all employees of Autumn Books do. He loves cats more than meeting deadlines.
Sanzu (サンズ)
Voiced by: Mariya Ise
An energetic girl who joined Autumn Books hoping to replace Fukuma as Ronaldo's editor. She has a habit of accidentally using dirty double entendres when talking to Ronaldo.

=== Others ===
Yomotsuzaka (ヨモツザカ)
Voiced by: Takehito Koyasu (Japanese); Tom Laflin (English)
The director of the Vampire Research Center. He studies vampires for his own reasons, but is often careless and lets his experiments escape. A fox-like mask obscures the top half of his face.
Kameya (カメ谷)
Voiced by: Takayuki Kondō (Japanese); Austin Sisk (English)
A photographer and reporter for Vampire Hunter Weekly. Being a former high school classmate of Ronaldo's, he follows the hunter's career closely.
Gamer Boy aka Scooter Kid (キックボードのガキ, Kickboard no gaki)
Voiced by: Mutsumi Tamura (Japanese); Bryce Papenbrook (English)
The kid from Draluc's castle. He also recently moved to Shin-Yokohama.
Boboo (暴々夫)
Voiced by: Haruo Yamagishi (Japanese); Jack Reeder (English)
The manager of the convenience store, Vamima, which is near the Ronaldo Agency. He frequently requests help for his son, Bubuo.
Bubuo (武々夫)
Voiced by: Yukihiro Nozuyama (Japanese); Justin Duncan (English)
Boboo's rebellious son who often gets bitten by inferior vampires.
Shin'ichi Katō (加藤 新一, Katō Shin'ichi), Hiroshi Yokota (横田 浩, Yotoka Hiroshi), and Makoto Hagino (萩野 真, Hagino Makoto)
Voiced by: Natsumi Fujiwara (Shin'ichi), Sayaka Kikuchi (Hiroshi), Ayaka Asai (Makoto) (Japanese); Kimmie Britt (Shin'ichi), Jennie Kwan (Hiroshi), Greg Vinciguerra (Makoto) (English)
The self-proclaimed Shin-Yokohama Boy Hunters. Three elementary aged boys who go hunting for vampires.

== Media ==
=== Manga ===
The Vampire Dies in No Time is written and illustrated by Itaru Bonnoki. The manga began its serialization in Akita Shoten's Weekly Shōnen Champion magazine on June 25, 2015. As of February 2026, twenty-six tankōbon volumes have been released. Orange Inc. acquired The Vampire Dies in No Time for digital English publication in North America on May, 2025.

| No. | Release date | ISBN |
|---|---|---|
| 1 | December 8, 2015 | 978-4-253-22279-2 |
| 2 | April 8, 2016 | 978-4-253-22280-8 |
| 3 | July 8, 2016 | 978-4-253-22281-5 |
| 4 | November 8, 2016 | 978-4-253-22282-2 |
| 5 | March 8, 2017 | 978-4-253-22283-9 |
| 6 | June 8, 2017 | 978-4-253-22284-6 |
| 7 | October 6, 2017 | 978-4-253-22285-3 |
| 8 | February 8, 2018 | 978-4-253-22323-2 |
| 9 | June 8, 2018 | 978-4-253-22324-9 |
| 10 | October 5, 2018 | 978-4-253-22325-6 |
| 11 | January 8, 2019 | 978-4-253-22326-3 |
| 12 | April 8, 2019 | 978-4-253-22327-0 |
| 13 | August 8, 2019 | 978-4-253-22328-7 |
| 14 | December 6, 2019 | 978-4-253-22329-4 |
| 15 | May 8, 2020 | 978-4-253-22330-0 |
| 16 | November 6, 2020 | 978-4-253-22231-0 |
| 17 | April 8, 2021 | 978-4-253-22232-7 |
| 18 | September 8, 2021 | 978-4-253-22233-4 |
| 19 | January 7, 2022 | 978-4-253-22234-1 |
| 20 | March 8, 2022 | 978-4-253-22235-8 |
| 21 | June 8, 2022 | 978-4-253-28191-1 |
| 22 | September 8, 2022 | 978-4-253-28192-8 |
| 23 | December 8, 2022 | 978-4-253-28193-5 |
| 24 | February 8, 2023 | 978-4-253-28194-2 |
| 25 | May 8, 2023 | 978-4-253-28195-9 |
| 26 | February 6, 2026 | 978-4-253-01140-2 |

=== Anime ===
An anime adaptation was announced in the 23rd issue of Weekly Shōnen Champion on May 7, 2020. The adaptation, revealed to be a television series, is animated by Madhouse and directed by Hiroshi Kōjina, with Yukie Sugawara overseeing the series' scripts, Mayuko Nakano designing the characters, and Ryō Takahashi composing the music. The series aired from October 4 to December 20, 2021, on Tokyo MX, BS11, tvk, KBS Kyoto, and SUN. Jun Fukuyama performed the series' opening theme song "Dies in No Time", while Daisuke Ono and Takayuki Kondō, performing as TRD, performed the series' ending theme song "Strangers". Funimation licensed the series outside of Asia. One year later, Netflix later licensing anime adaptation in Asia in August 31.

After the airing of the series' final episode, a second season was announced. The staff members of the first season reprised their roles. The second season aired from January 9 to March 27, 2023. Jun Fukuyama and TRD returned to perform the opening and ending theme songs, respectively titled "New Drama Paradise" and "Cozy Crazy Party!".

==== Episode list ====
===== Season 1 =====
| Series | Episode | Title | Directed by | Written by | Storyboarded by | Original release date |
|---|---|---|---|---|---|---|
| 1 | 1 | "The Hunter Comes and Flies in the Sky" (Note: Title written as 退治人(ハンター)来たりて空を跳ぶ in the episode.); Transliteration: "Hantā Kitarite Sora o Tobu Zenpen" (Japanese: 退治人(ハンター)来たりて空を跳ぶ 前編) | Satoru Matsubara | Yukie Sugawara | Hiroshi Kōjina | October 4, 2021 |
| 1 | 1 | "The Idiot, the Convenience Store, and Impermanence"; Transliteration: "Baka to Konbini to Mujō" (Japanese: バカとコンビニと無常) | Satoru Matsubara | Yukie Sugawara | Hiroshi Kōjina | October 4, 2021 |
| 2 | 2 | "Assault! Mr. Fukuma" (Note: Title written as 襲撃！フクマさん in the episode.); Transliteration: "Shūgeki!! Fukuma-san" (Japanese: 襲撃!!フクマさん) | Asami Kawano | Yoshiki Ōkusa | Asami Kawano | October 11, 2021 |
| 2 | 2 | "Falling Like Flowers in Shin-Yokohama"; Transliteration: "Shin-Yokohama ni Hana to Chiruramu" (Japanese: 新横浜に花と散るらむ) | Asami Kawano | Yoshiki Ōkusa | Asami Kawano | October 11, 2021 |
| 2 | 2 | "Can a Bang on the Wall Kill Him?"; Transliteration: "Kabe o Tataite Koroseru ka" (Japanese: 壁を叩いて殺せるか) | Asami Kawano | Yoshiki Ōkusa | Asami Kawano | October 11, 2021 |
| 3 | 3 | "Highway to Success, Path to Failure"; Transliteration: "Shusse Kaidō Tenraku-dō" (Japanese: 出世街道転落道) | Satoru Matsubara | Itsuki Yokoyama | Mitsuyuki Masuhara | October 18, 2021 |
| 3 | 3 | "Ridiculous Hunter Guild"; Transliteration: "Bakasawagi Hantāzu Girudo" (Japanese: バカ騒ぎ退治人(ハンターズ)ギルド) | Satoru Matsubara | Itsuki Yokoyama | Mitsuyuki Masuhara | October 18, 2021 |
| 3 | 3 | "More Ridiculous Hunter Guild"; Transliteration: "Mada Bakasawagi Hantāzu Girudo" (Japanese: まだバカ騒ぎ退治人(ハンターズ)ギルド) | Satoru Matsubara | Itsuki Yokoyama | Mitsuyuki Masuhara | October 18, 2021 |
| 4 | 4 | "I Have Desire, Therefore I Metamorphose"; Transliteration: "Erosu Yue ni Metamorufōze" (Japanese: 愛(エロス)ゆえに変態(メタモルフォーゼ)) | Takaaki Ishiyama | Yukie Sugawara | Tomoya Kitagawa | October 25, 2021 |
| 4 | 4 | "Kitchen Liberal Force"; Transliteration: "Daidokoro Riberaru Fōsu" (Japanese: 台所リベラルフォース) | Takaaki Ishiyama | Yukie Sugawara | Tomoya Kitagawa | October 25, 2021 |
| 4 | 4 | "The Man's Name Is Handa"; Transliteration: "Sono Otoko no Na wa Handa" (Japanese: その男の名は半田) | Takaaki Ishiyama | Yukie Sugawara | Tomoya Kitagawa | October 25, 2021 |
Odd Creature visits Ronaldo's Office for advice with controlling his transformations. Ronaldo, Draluc, and John contend with an increasing number of vampire vegetables in their apartment. Handa, who hates Ronaldo, enlists Draluc's help to search the apartment for dirt on Ronaldo.
| 5 | 5 | "The Longest Day of Tsujigiri Nagiri"; Transliteration: "Tsujigiri Nagiri no Ichiban Nagai Hi" (Japanese: 辻斬りナギリのいちばん長い日) | Chie Yamashiro | Yoshiki Ōkusa | Chie Yamashiro | November 1, 2021 |
| 5 | 5 | "Cats Are Cute"; Transliteration: "Neko wa Kawaii" (Japanese: 猫はかわいい) | Chie Yamashiro | Yoshiki Ōkusa | Chie Yamashiro | November 1, 2021 |
| 5 | 5 | "Handa, Day Off, History"; Transliteration: "Handa Ofu no Hi Hisutorī" (Japanese: 半田・オフの日・ヒストリー) | Chie Yamashiro | Yoshiki Ōkusa | Chie Yamashiro | November 1, 2021 |
Vamp Control and the Hunters' Guild search for Tsujigiri, a vampire who made himself practically invincible by making a doll his weakness. Meanwhile, Draluc and John stumble upon the doll. As Tsujigiri seeks to recover it, Draluc's carelessness with the doll causes him great pain and humiliation. Ronaldo, Draluc, John, and Hinaichi struggle to rescue a cat, Bosatsu, in the crawl space above Ronaldo's Office. It is then revealed that the cat is a vampire set on enslaving humanity for cats through hypnosis. Handa drops by the apartment while Ronaldo is out. Once settled, he recounts his high school encounters with Ronaldo to an eager Draluc.
| 6 | 6 | "Tale of the Empress's Birth"; Transliteration: "Jotei Tanjō Monogatari" (Japanese: 女帝誕生物語) | Jun'ichi Fujise | Yukie Sugawara | Tomoya Kitagawa | November 8, 2021 |
| 6 | 6 | "Draluc's Family"; Transliteration: "Doraruku-ke no Ichizoku" (Japanese: ドラルク家の一族) | Jun'ichi Fujise | Yukie Sugawara | Tomoya Kitagawa | November 8, 2021 |
| 6 | 6 | "Draluc's Family, Continued"; Transliteration: "Zoku Doraruku-ke no Ichizoku" (Japanese: 続・ドラルク家の一族) | Jun'ichi Fujise | Yukie Sugawara | Tomoya Kitagawa | November 8, 2021 |
| 7 | 7 | "Lewd Talk-a-Talk-Talk-Talk"; Transliteration: "Waidan Dadandandandadān" (Japanese: Y談ダダンダンダンダダーン) | Asami Kawano | Yukie Sugawara | Hiroshi Kōjina | November 15, 2021 |
| 7 | 7 | "Tou Handa's Terrible Day Off"; Transliteration: "Handa Tō no Sanzan na Hiban no Hi" (Japanese: 半田桃の散々な非番の日) | Asami Kawano | Yukie Sugawara | Hiroshi Kōjina | November 15, 2021 |
| 7 | 7 | "And Then Comes Father"; Transliteration: "Soshite Chichi ga Kuru" (Japanese: そして父が来る) | Asami Kawano | Yukie Sugawara | Hiroshi Kōjina | November 15, 2021 |
| 8 | 8 | "The Bat's Close Call"; Transliteration: "Pisu Pisu Kiki Ippatsu" (Japanese: ピスピス危機一髪) | Satoru Matsubara | Yukie Sugawara | Masatoshi Hakata | November 22, 2021 |
| 8 | 8 | "Kidnap Capriccio"; Transliteration: "Kiddonappu Kapurichio" (Japanese: キッドナップ・カプリチオ) | Satoru Matsubara | Yukie Sugawara | Masatoshi Hakata | November 22, 2021 |
| 8 | 8 | "Kidnap Elegy"; Transliteration: "Kiddonappu Erejī" (Japanese: キッドナップ・エレジー) | Satoru Matsubara | Yukie Sugawara | Masatoshi Hakata | November 22, 2021 |
| 9 | 9 | "Citizen Baseball Kane"; Transliteration: "Shimin Yakyū Kēn" (Japanese: 市民野球ケーン) | Yūki Kusakabe | Yukie Sugawara | Asami Kawano | November 29, 2021 |
| 9 | 9 | "The Left Hand of Iron Is Kind of Boring"; Transliteration: "Tetsu no Hidarite Imaichi Jimi de" (Japanese: 鉄の左手イマイチ地味で) | Yūki Kusakabe | Yukie Sugawara | Asami Kawano | November 29, 2021 |
| 9 | 9 | "Emperor of the Shore"; Transliteration: "Nagisa no Teiō-sama" (Japanese: 渚の帝王様) | Yūki Kusakabe | Yukie Sugawara | Asami Kawano | November 29, 2021 |
Yakyūken Lover challenges the Hunters' Guild members to strip rock-paper-scissors. After Satetsu bemoans his life, Ronaldo loans him Draluc and John. Later the temporary-trio face off against Etiquette Breacher, a vampire creating minor mischief. At night, some Hunters' Guild members and Draluc arrive at the beach, only to find everyone hypnotized into wearing micro bikinis.
| 10 | 10 | "The Festival Music Calls You"; Transliteration: "Matsuri Bayashi ga Kimi o Yobu" (Japanese: 祭り囃子が君を呼ぶ) | Chie Yamashiro | Yukie Sugawara | Chie Yamashiro | December 6, 2021 |
| 10 | 10 | "Heisei Annoying Vampire Battle in Shin-Yoko"; Transliteration: "Heisei Meiwaku na Kyūketsuki Gassen Shin'yoko" (Japanese: 平成迷惑な吸血鬼合戦シンヨコ) | Chie Yamashiro | Yukie Sugawara | Chie Yamashiro | December 6, 2021 |
| 10 | 10 | "Draluc's All Night Shin-Yoko"; Transliteration: "Doraruku no Ōru Naito Shin'yoko" (Japanese: ドラルクのオールナイト・シンヨコ) | Chie Yamashiro | Yukie Sugawara | Chie Yamashiro | December 6, 2021 |
| 11 | 11 | "Shin-Yoko Battle Royale"; Transliteration: "Shin'yoko Batoru Rowaiyaru" (Japanese: シンヨコ・バトル・ロYヤル) | Jun'ichi Fujise; Satoru Matsubara | Yukie Sugawara | Masatoshi Hakata | December 13, 2021 |
| 11 | 11 | "John meets Draluc" | Jun'ichi Fujise; Satoru Matsubara | Yukie Sugawara | Masatoshi Hakata | December 13, 2021 |
| 11 | 11 | "Waiting for LOVE" | Jun'ichi Fujise; Satoru Matsubara | Yukie Sugawara | Masatoshi Hakata | December 13, 2021 |
| 12 | 12 | "Silver Rise Blind Your Eyes"; Transliteration: "Shirubā Raizu Buraindo Yua Aizu" (Japanese: シルバーライズ・ブラインド・ユア・アイズ) | Asami Kawano | Yukie Sugawara | Asami Kawano | December 20, 2021 |
| 12 | 12 | "Dress Up for You"; Transliteration: "Doresu Appu Fō Yū" (Japanese: ドレスアップ・フォー・ユー) | Asami Kawano | Yukie Sugawara | Asami Kawano | December 20, 2021 |
| 12 | 12 | "Five Dumb Matches"; Transliteration: "Baka Goban Shōbu" (Japanese: バカ五番勝負) | Asami Kawano | Yukie Sugawara | Asami Kawano | December 20, 2021 |

===== Season 2 =====
| Story | Episode | Title | Directed by | Written by | Storyboarded by | Original release date |
|---|---|---|---|---|---|---|
| 13 | 1 | "Draluc, Friends, Almost Independent"; Transliteration: "Doraruku・Tomodachi・Hitoridachi Misui" (Japanese: ドラルク・ともだち・ひとりだち未遂) | Mayuko Nakano | Tori Takashi | Asami Kawano | January 9, 2023 |
| 13 | 1 | "Go, Ghost Hunters"; Transliteration: "Soreike Gōsutohantāzu" (Japanese: それ行けゴーストハンターズ) | Mayuko Nakano | Tori Takashi | Asami Kawano | January 9, 2023 |
| 13 | 1 | "Draluc the Silent Jammer"; Transliteration: "Doraruku・Za・Sirentojyamā" (Japanese: ドラルク・ザ・サイレントジャマー) | Mayuko Nakano | Tori Takashi | Asami Kawano | January 9, 2023 |
| 14 | 2 | "From Tokyo to Neo Bayside"; Transliteration: "Furomu Tokyo tu Neo Bei Saido" (Japanese: フロム トーキョー トゥ ネオ ベイサイド) | Hideki Tonokatsu | Tori Takashi | Junichi Sakata | January 16, 2023 |
| 14 | 2 | "Exciting Draluc Surveillance Diary"; Transliteration: "WakuWaku Doraruku Kansatsu Nikki" (Japanese: わくわくドラルク観察日記) | Hideki Tonokatsu | Tori Takashi | Junichi Sakata | January 16, 2023 |
| 14 | 2 | "Quest of Soul Gate: Investigators of the Soul"; Transliteration: "Quest of Soul Gate: Tamashī no Tankyū-sha-tachi" (Japanese: Quest of Soul Gate:魂の探求者たち) | Hideki Tonokatsu | Tori Takashi | Junichi Sakata | January 16, 2023 |
| 15 | 3 | "Lovecall of Sanzu" | Mitsuyuki Masuhara | Tori Takashi | Mitsuyuki Masuhara | January 23, 2023 |
| 15 | 3 | "Do Your Best, Sagyo"; Transliteration: "Ganbare Sagyō-kun" (Japanese: がんばれサギョウくん) | Mitsuyuki Masuhara | Tori Takashi | Mitsuyuki Masuhara | January 23, 2023 |
| 15 | 3 | "Chaosman Is Back"; Transliteration: "Kattekita Mechakuchaman" (Japanese: 帰ってきたメチャクチャマン) | Mitsuyuki Masuhara | Tori Takashi | Mitsuyuki Masuhara | January 23, 2023 |
| 16 | 4 | "Minding the Guild with a Suspicious Person"; Transliteration: "O Miseban to Fushin-sha" (Japanese: お店番と不審者) | Shinnosuke Tonaka | Tori Takashi | Masatoshi Hakata | January 30, 2023 |
| 16 | 4 | "Good Mother, Goodbye Summer"; Transliteration: "Guddo Mazā・Guddobai Samā" (Japanese: グッドマザー・グッドバイサマー) | Shinnosuke Tonaka | Tori Takashi | Masatoshi Hakata | January 30, 2023 |
| 16 | 4 | "Good Mother, Goodbye Summer, Part 2"; Transliteration: "Zoku・Guddo Mazā・Guddobai Samā" (Japanese: 続・グッドマザー・グッドバイサマー) | Shinnosuke Tonaka | Tori Takashi | Masatoshi Hakata | January 30, 2023 |
| 17 | 5 | "The Dream-Quest of Unknown Fukuda"; Transliteration: "Michinaru Fukuma ni Yume o Motomete" (Japanese: 未知なるフクマに夢を求めて) | Jun'ichi Fujise | Tori Takashi | Masatoshi Hakata | February 6, 2023 |
| 17 | 5 | "A Kind Man Under Siege"; Transliteration: "Bōsō Tokkyū Ohitoyoshi" (Japanese: 暴走特急お人好し) | Jun'ichi Fujise | Tori Takashi | Masatoshi Hakata | February 6, 2023 |
| 17 | 5 | "Last Stop, Ura-Shin-Yokohama"; Transliteration: "Tsugi wa Shūten Ura-Shin-Yokohama" (Japanese: 次は終点裏新横浜) | Jun'ichi Fujise | Tori Takashi | Masatoshi Hakata | February 6, 2023 |
| 18 | 6 | "Big Brother Saga, Light Chapter"; Transliteration: "Aniki・Sāga・Hikari no Shō" (Japanese: アニキ・サーガ 光の章) | Asami Kawano | Tori Takashi | Asami Kawano | February 13, 2023 |
| 18 | 6 | "Big Brother Saga, Dark Chapter"; Transliteration: "Aniki・Sāga・Yami no Shō" (Japanese: アニキ・サーガ 闇の章) | Asami Kawano | Tori Takashi | Asami Kawano | February 13, 2023 |
| 18 | 6 | "The Deadline March"; Transliteration: "Oshuraba kōshinkyoku" (Japanese: お修羅場行進曲) | Asami Kawano | Tori Takashi | Asami Kawano | February 13, 2023 |
| 19 | 7 | "Put a sock in it!!!" | Yūki Morishita | Tori Takashi | Hirōshi Kojima; Junichi Sakata | February 20, 2023 |
| 19 | 7 | "Wee' Are the State"; Transliteration: "Chin wa Kokkanari" (Japanese: ちんは国家なり) | Yūki Morishita | Tori Takashi | Hirōshi Kojima; Junichi Sakata | February 20, 2023 |
| 19 | 7 | "John, You've Gotten Dog"; Transliteration: "Jyon Inutta na" (Japanese: ジョン 犬ったな) | Yūki Morishita | Tori Takashi | Hirōshi Kojima; Junichi Sakata | February 20, 2023 |
| 20 | 8 | "Oh! Nude"; Transliteration: "O・zenra" (Japanese: オオ・ゼンラ) | Sumito Sasaki | Tori Takashi | Junichi Sakata | February 27, 2023 |
| 20 | 8 | "Handa's Dadandandan Da-Talk"; Transliteration: "Handa so Dadandandandadan" (Japanese: 半田ンダダンダンダンダダーン) | Sumito Sasaki | Tori Takashi | Junichi Sakata | February 27, 2023 |
| 20 | 8 | "Will the Moon Rise Again over Shin-Yoko?"; Transliteration: "Shin'Yokohama ni Tsuki wa Mata Noboru ka?" (Japanese: 新横浜に月はまた昇るか？) | Sumito Sasaki | Tori Takashi | Junichi Sakata | February 27, 2023 |
| 21 | 9 | "Utopia BBOLAND"; Transliteration: "Yume no Kuni BBOLAND" (Japanese: 夢の国BBOLAND) | Mitsuyuki Masuhara | Tori Takashi | Mitsuyuki Masuhara | March 6, 2023 |
| 21 | 9 | "Dad and the Suspicious Person"; Transliteration: "Otōsan to Fushin-sha" (Japanese: お父さんと不審者) | Mitsuyuki Masuhara | Tori Takashi | Mitsuyuki Masuhara | March 6, 2023 |
| 21 | 9 | "Hello, How Are You? Are You Free?"; Transliteration: "Harō・Hawayū・Imao Hima?" (Japanese: ハロー・ハワユー・いまおヒマ？) | Mitsuyuki Masuhara | Tori Takashi | Mitsuyuki Masuhara | March 6, 2023 |
| 22 | 10 | "Little Little Concerto"; Transliteration: "Ritoru・Ritoru・Kyōsōkyoku" (Japanese: リトル・リトル・協奏曲) | Shinnosuke Tonaka | Tori Takashi | Masatoshi Hakata | March 13, 2023 |
| 22 | 10 | "Little Little Concerto ~ Duck Squashing Part~"; Transliteration: "Ritoru・Ritoru・Kyōsōkyoku ~ Kamo Tsubushi-Hen~" (Japanese: リトル・リトル・協奏曲〜鴨潰し編〜) | Shinnosuke Tonaka | Tori Takashi | Masatoshi Hakata | March 13, 2023 |
| 22 | 10 | "Miracle, Manacle, Why Do I Always End Up Like This?"; Transliteration: "Mirakuru・Manakaru・Dōshiteitsu mo Ore wa Kō Naru" (Japanese: ミラクル・マナクル・どうしていつも俺はこうなる) | Shinnosuke Tonaka | Tori Takashi | Masatoshi Hakata | March 13, 2023 |
| 23 | 11 | "Please Suggest Warming Each Other Up"; Transliteration: "Atatametekure to Ittekure" (Japanese: 温めてくれと言ってくれ) | Tatsunori Miyake; Kang Il-gu; Hwang Il-jin | Tori Takashi | Junichi Sakata | March 20, 2023 |
| 23 | 11 | "Legend of the Ronaldist"; Transliteration: "Regendo Obu Ronarisuto" (Japanese: レジェンド オブ ロナリスト) | Tatsunori Miyake; Kang Il-gu; Hwang Il-jin | Tori Takashi | Junichi Sakata | March 20, 2023 |
| 23 | 11 | "Waltz with the Smiling Ice Lord in the Town of the Eternal"; Transliteration: "Tokyo no Machi wa Kōri Emi Kyō to Warutsu o Odoru" (Japanese: 常世の町は氷笑卿とワルツを踊る) | Tatsunori Miyake; Kang Il-gu; Hwang Il-jin | Tori Takashi | Junichi Sakata | March 20, 2023 |
| 24 | 12 | "Waltz with the Smiling Ice Lord in the Town of the Eternal, Continued"; Transliteration: "Zoku・Tokyo no Machi wa Kōri Emi Kyō to Warutsu o Odoru" (Japanese: 続・常世の町は氷笑卿とワルツを踊る) | Asami Kawano | Tori Takashi | Asami Kawano | March 27, 2023 |
| 24 | 12 | "Fun Stupid Guys in Shin-Yokohama Special ver." Transliteration: "Shin-Yokohama no Tanoshī Baka Yarōtachi Supesharu Ver." (Japanese: 新横浜の楽しいバカ野郎たち スペシャル ver.) | Asami Kawano | Tori Takashi | Asami Kawano | March 27, 2023 |
