= My Brother's Friend =

- Directed by: Ryo Nakajima
- Screenplay by: Chieko Nakagawa
- Based on: manga series Anitomo by Modomu Akagawara
- Starring: Ryusei Yokohama; Risaki Matsukaze; Koudai Matsuoka; Tsuyoshi Furukawa
- Release date: May 28, 2018 (Japan)
- Running time: 85 minutes
- Country: Japan
- Language: Japanese

My Brother's Friend (Japanese: 兄友, Hepburn: Anitomo) is a 2018 Japanese romantic comedy film based on Modomu Akagawara's 2015 manga series Anitomo. Directed by Ryo Nakajima, it stars Ryusei Yokohama and Risaki Matsukaze.

Anitomo was first published as a one-shot in Hakusensha's The Hana to Yume magazine in January 2015 before it was launched as a series in May 2015. It was also adapted for a drama series which also stars the same leads. It premiered in March 2018.

== Cast ==
- Ryusei Yokohama as Sōta Nishino
- Risaki Matsukaze as Mai Nanase
- Koudai Matsuoka as Ituski Kaga
- Tsuyoshi Furukawa as Yukihiro Nanase
- Karin Ono as Aki Nishino
- Jun Fukuyama as Haginosuke Tachibana
