= Grenadier (manga) =

Japanese manga series and its adaptations

- Second tankōbon volume cover, featuring Rushuna Tendō (front), Mikan Kurenai (right), and Yajirō Kojima (back)

グレネーダー (Gurenēdā)
- Genre: Comedy; Girls with guns; Western
- Manga
- Written by: Sōsuke Kaise
- Published by: Kadokawa Shoten
- English publisher: NA: Tokyopop (former); Viz Media (current; digital)
- Magazine: Monthly Shōnen Ace
- Original run: April 26, 2002 – March 26, 2005
- Volumes: 7
- Anime television series
- Directed by: Hiroshi Kōjina
- Produced by: Toyoo Ashida; Hitoshi Kawamura; Yutaka Ōhashi
- Written by: Akira Okeya
- Music by: Yasunori Iwasaki
- Studio: Studio Live; Group TAC
- Licensed by: NA: Media Blasters
- Original network: Wowow
- Original run: October 15, 2004 – January 14, 2005
- Episodes: 12
- icon

Grenadier (Japanese: グレネーダー, Hepburn: Gurenēdā) is a Japanese manga series written and illustrated by Sōsuke Kaise. It was serialized in Kadokawa Shoten's shōnen manga magazine Monthly Shōnen Ace from April 2002 to March 2005, with its chapters collected in seven tankōbon volumes. In North America, the manga was initially licensed by Tokyopop and released in print from 2006 to 2008. It was later licensed for digital release by Viz Media and released in 2015.

A 12-episode anime television series adaptation, produced by Studio Live and Group TAC, and directed by Hiroshi Kōjina, was broadcast on Wowow from October 2004 to January 2005. The series was licensed in North America by Media Blasters.

== Plot ==
Rushuna Tendō, a skilled teenage gunfighter known as a Senshi or "Enlightened", travels alongside the samurai Yajirō Kojima, a mercenary swordsman. Their journey begins when Yajirō and a group of samurai launch an unsuccessful assault on a fort occupied by enemy gunners, who have captured their lord. Forced to retreat, Yajirō flees to a cliff and escapes by jumping into a hot spring, where he encounters Rushuna bathing. Unperturbed by her nudity or his presence, she hides him from pursuers before explaining her philosophy of resolving conflict by removing an enemy's will to fight.

Returning to the battlefield, Yajirō witnesses the enemy leader wielding a Gatling gun to devastating effect. Rushuna intervenes, demonstrating her exceptional marksmanship and single-handedly defeating the gunner, securing the lord's rescue. Inspired by her methods, Yajirō chooses to accompany her as her partner.

Their travels bring them into conflict with a masked figure known as the Jester, who commands a dangerous weapon called "Enlightened Evil". They later learn that Tenshi, the one who sent Rushuna on her journey to master the "Ultimate Battle Strategy", has placed a bounty on her head. Joined by Mikan Kurenai, a young balloon maker, the trio proceeds toward the capital of Tento, overcoming numerous adversaries, including the elite Juttensen, Tenshi's personal guards. Upon reaching Tento, they uncover the truth behind their struggles, leading to a final confrontation with the Jester.

== Characters ==
=== Main characters ===
Rushuna Tendou (天道 琉朱菜, Tendō Rushuna)
Voiced by: Mikako Takahashi (Japanese); Wendee Lee (English)
A 16-year-old blonde Senshi trained in Tenshi's pacifist teachings. Skilled in gun kata, she uses her revolver to disable foes without killing. Her analytical skills allow her to adapt in combat, exploiting opponents' weaknesses efficiently. She often subdues enemies by embracing them or conceals ammunition in her cleavage. Fond of hot baths, she indulges in them frequently. Though she cares for Yajiro, she delays romance until her mission ends. Her surname, meaning "heavenly path", reflects her wandering life. Trained by Soun, she later marries Yajiro.
Yajiro Kojima (虎島 弥次郎, Kojima Yajirō)
Voiced by: Kazuya Nakai (Japanese); Sam Riegal (English)
A swordsman known as the "Tiger of the Rearguard", a title reflecting his heightened combat ability when outmatched. Once a mercenary, he joins Rushuna in her mission for unity despite his aversion to firearms, which he believes devalue human life—though he exempts Rushuna from this judgment. His exceptional strength enables him to crush boulders and slice cannon shells. The journey to Tento's capital follows the same path his rebel army took during their failed invasion, holding personal significance. Initially irritated by Rushuna's nickname "Yat-chan", he eventually accepts it. Their partnership deepens over time, leading to marriage.
Mikan Kurenai (紅 みかん, Kurenai Mikan)
Voiced by: Yuki Matsuoka (Japanese); Julie Ann Taylor (English)
An orphaned girl from a family of balloon makers, displaying exceptional skill in balloon artistry despite her youth. After her parents' deaths at the hands of Tenma Ganzo's senshi, she joins Touka Kurenai and other displaced girls at Peach Blossom Tower, initially seeking revenge. Rushuna's influence helps her abandon vengeance, shown when she spares Ganzo despite having the opportunity. She subsequently joins Rushuna and Yajiro's journey as a traveling companion. Later, she assumes management of Peach Blossom Tower from Touka.

=== The Juttensen ===
The Juttensen (十天閃, Juttensen) are Tento's elite assassins, each wielding one of the ten sacred weapons.

Touka Kurenai (紅 桃華, Kurenai Tōka)
Voiced by: Mami Kosuge (Japanese); Cindy Robinson (English)
Touka operates the Peach Blossom Tower brothel and formerly served among the Ten Heavenly Enlightened. She rescued Mikan after Ganzo's gang killed her parents, offering shelter alongside other war orphans. A master of Tenshi's ultimate combat techniques, she allies with Rushuna after verifying her adherence to Tenshi's philosophy. Despite battling an undisclosed illness that occasionally affects her in prolonged fights, she wields a chained lance with an explosive projectile capable of deflecting bullets. Though sharing Mikan's surname, they are unrelated. Her past includes repelling the Rear Guard during the capital tunnel incident before leaving the Heavenly Enlightened. While she clashes with Rushuna in both adaptations, the circumstances differ—in one version due to property damage during a dispute with Mikan, in another over mistaken criminal allegations.
Sanzo Souma (蒼馬 三蔵, Sōma Sanzō)
Voiced by: Fumihiko Tachiki (Japanese); Peter Spellos (English)
Known as the Blade-Bard Enlightened, he possesses strength sufficient to fell large trees. His primary weapons employ sound-based attacks: gauntlets that produce deafening "Voice of God" waves and a chest-mounted hybrid accordion/piano device called the Annihilation Surge Array, activated by nasal airflow to disrupt equilibrium. While the anime concludes with his death at the Jester's hands, the manga depicts him merely losing his Juttensen rank.
Teppa Aizen (藍前 鉄破, Aizen Teppa)
Voiced by: Nobuyuki Hiyama (Japanese); Doug Erholtz (English)
Teppa, the Cloth Skill Enlightened, is the 10th head of the Aizen Clan. He wields his family's signature technique, the Aizen Style Armor Cloth Skill—a 300-year-old art that transforms cloth into living armor or weapons, typically using adamantium-infused fabric. His arsenal includes explosive gauntlets. After losing to Rushuna, he allies with her and later aids her in the capital. A self-proclaimed ladies' man, he survives the Jester's purge thanks to his adamantium defenses. While the anime depicts a childhood connection with Rushuna, the manga presents their bond forming after their battle, with Teppa's persistent but unreciprocated romantic interest in her.
Fuuka Shirato (白土風花, Shiratō Fūka)
Voiced by: Naoko Suzuki (Japanese); Mia Bradly (English)
Fuuka Shirato, the Welding Wild Dance Enlightened, was Yajiro's former comrade who uniquely called him "Tiger". Presumed dead after falling from Mt. Charanbo during the rebel march, she was actually saved by the Jester and fused with an Enlightened Evil gun. In Tento, she pledged loyalty to "Tenshi" (Setsuna in disguise) after learning their goals aligned. When the Jester—revealed as her former leader Mountain Templar—attacks Yajiro, she intervenes but both are blasted over a cliff. Recreating their past fall, she chooses to release Yajiro's hand, sacrificing herself. The manga replaces her with Suguha Kojima, Yajiro's clan leader's sister.
Shin'noshin Hakubi (白尾 神之進, Hakubi Shin'noshin)
Voiced by: Kazuki Yao
Known as the Water Wolf Senshi, he rules White Wizard Lake—the fog-covered body of water between Mt. Charanbo and the capital. A year prior, he annihilated the surviving rebel forces attempting to cross the lake. Posing as a ferryman, he strands Rushuna's group mid-lake before attacking with specialized underwater gear: clawed propulsion gloves and a torpedo launcher. He communicates underwater using hand signs, a method later employed against Teppa in the capital. While the anime concludes with his execution by the Jester after defeat, the manga shows him merely losing his Juttensen status.
Yuzuriha Shimon (緇門 ゆずりは, Shimon Yuzuriha)
A masked member of the Juttensen known as "The Brilliant Explosive". She specializes in wielding an energy-based whip weapon in combat.
Danjo Oma (黄魔 弾丞, Ōma Danjō)
Known as "The Cunning", he is a long-haired Juttensen member. His combat style relies on superhuman strength and gauntlet-enhanced fists capable of generating powerful shockwaves. A translation error in the manga accidentally swapped his name with Honmaru's.
Honmaru Tojo (橙条 本丸, Tōjō Honmaru)
A young Juttensen member who fights using the Heat Armor, a specialized mechanical combat suit.

=== Other characters ===
Tenshi (天子)
Voiced by: Chieko Honda (Japanese); Dorothy Elias-Fahn (English)
Tenshi, Empress of Tento, is a young but wise ruler. She developed the ultimate battle strategy that Rushuna follows—defeating opponents by removing their will to fight rather than through physical combat.
Kaizan Doushi (開山 道士, Kaizan Dōshi)
Voiced by: Kazuhiro Nakata (Japanese); Kim Strauss (English)
Known as "The Jester", he serves as Setsuna Oomidou's chief enforcer in her conquest plans. Formerly the rebel leader "Mountain Templar", he commanded the failed assault on the capital eighteen months prior—an attack that ended when Suirou destroyed his forces at White Wizard Lake. While wielding an Enlightened Evil gun as his primary weapon, he maintains exceptional swordsmanship and possesses teleportation abilities augmented by flight-capable boots. His true nature as a villain predates these events by at least a decade. Yajiro, one of the few survivors of the lake ambush, once held him in high esteem.
Setsuna Oomido (大御堂 刹那, Ōmidō Setsuna)
Voiced by: Dorothy Elias-Fahn
Setsuna Oomido, one of Tenshi's body doubles, mirrors Rushuna's background as a pre-Juttensen candidate with equivalent revolver training and combat skills. She orchestrates a coup by imprisoning Tenshi and assuming her identity to seize control of the capital, with ambitions of global domination. Her close relationship with Kaizan Doushi suggests romantic involvement. Following her defeat by Rushuna, she embarks on a journey of redemption. The manga presents an alternate origin, identifying her as Namari Shirogane (銀ナマリ, Shirogane Namari) who allies with the Iron-Masked Baron in a rival bid for the Grenadier title.
Kasumi (霞)
Voiced by: Kumi Sakuma
A shotgun-wielding operative who fought alongside Yajiro during his rebel days. Posing as a rebel sympathizer, she secretly works for Kaizan Doushi and Setsuna Oomido, hiding her weapon in a prostitute's bamboo mat disguise. Her allegiance shifts when Teppa Aizen subdues her with his armor cloth during an assassination attempt on Rushuna, sparking romantic feelings. This development creates tension with Teppa's other admirers as Kasumi becomes possessive of him.
Ganzo Arima (有馬 ガン蔵, Arima Ganzō) / Ganzo Tenma (伝馬 ガン蔵, Tenma Ganzō) (anime)
Voiced by: Tadahisa Saizen (Japanese); Bob Papenbrook (English)
Ganzo leads the bandit group responsible for killing Mikan's parents. After Rushuna rescues three of Touka Kurenai's workers from his men, he attacks Peach Blossom Tower with Banmaru Zoushi. Defeated by Rushuna and spared by Mikan, he redeems himself by aiding Touka's reconstruction efforts.
Furon (風龍)
Voiced by: Motoki Takagi (Japanese); Yuri Lowenthal (English)
Furon, the 17-year-old monarch of Tara, rules a neighboring kingdom to Tento. Revered for his generosity, he was deceived by the Jester a decade earlier into using Enlightened Evil for national defense. This stunted his physical growth, officially attributed to illness. His monstrous combat armor—distinguished by a blonde mane—earns a bounty for its destructive legacy, accidentally implicating Rushuna due to matching hair color. Upon his defeat, the armor's destruction restores Furon to his true age. Rushuna convinces him that Tara's security lies in his people's loyalty rather than forbidden weapons.
Koto (琴)
Voiced by: Noa Nagai (Japanese); Stephanie Sheh (English)
Koto works at Yamaishi's Bar in Tara, where she serves Rushuna and Yajiro during their travels. A devoted follower of King Furon, she treasures a pendant he gave her. After preparing a healing bath for Rushuna's injuries from Furon's armored suit, she becomes collateral damage when the Jester attacks—wounded in the anime but killed in the manga when intercepting an attack meant for Rushuna. This incident triggers Rushuna's assault on Furon's castle.
Banmaru Zoushi (造師 蛮丸, Zōshi Banmaru)
Voiced by: Tomohiro Nishimura (Japanese); Peter Spellos (English)
Banmaru is a skilled inventor initially allied with Tenma Ganzo, aspiring to join the Juttensen. After his defeat by Rushuna, he assists Touka Kurenai by designing Peach Blossom Tower's reconstruction. His engineering prowess is demonstrated when he converts the tower into a massive cannon capable of launching Touka to the capital in response to Mikan's urgent balloon message.
Nago Akki (悪鬼 那号, Akki Nagō)
Voiced by: Kiyoyuki Yanada (Japanese); Bob Papenbrook (English)
He leads a powerful bandit group that captures Lord Kanetsugu's castle. His forces maintain control despite being outnumbered due to their superior firearms. Nagou wields "Guld," a powerful but inaccurate machine gun mounted on his left arm. Rushuna defeats him singlehandedly—in the anime by precisely stripping his armor with revolver shots, while the manga depicts a more direct headshot. His defeat ends the bandits' occupation of the castle.
Kanetsugu
Kanetsugu rules a mountain castle along Rushuna's travel route. When the bandit Nago Akki captures his fortress and takes him hostage, Kanetsugu's generals hire Yajiro as a mercenary for the rescue. The bandits use Kanetsugu as bait to lure the heroes into a courtyard minefield. After Rushuna defeats Nago's forces, the bandit leader attempts to escape with his hostage but fails. Throughout the ordeal, Kanetsugu's loyal troops mount repeated—though unsuccessful—assaults on the castle despite suffering heavy losses in their attempts to free their lord.
Midare Kojima (虎島 乱, Kojima Midare)
He leads the warrior-farmer Kojima clan. Holding Yajiro responsible for his sister Suguha's death, he confronts him wielding the electrified Thunderclap Longsword. After resolving their conflict, Midare presents Yajiro with the clan heirloom Tiger Fang Great Sword, symbolizing their reconciliation.
Tekka Aizen (藍前 鉄華, Aizen Tekka)
Teppa's younger sister. Upon hearing of Rushuna's victory over her brother, she initiates an unconventional capture-the-flag competition against her.

== Media ==
=== Manga ===
Written and illustrated by Sōsuke Kaise, Grenadier was serialized in Kadokawa Shoten's shōnen manga magazine Monthly Shōnen Ace from April 26, 2002, (Note: It started in the magazine's June 2002 issue, released on April 26 of that same year.) to March 26, 2005. Kadokawa Shoten collected its chapters in seven tankōbon volumes, released from June 26, 2003, to May 24, 2005.

In North America, the manga was licensed for an English print release by Tokyopop; the seven volumes were released from August 8, 2006, to August 12, 2008. The manga was later licensed for an English digital release by Viz Media; the seven volumes were released from April 21 to September 29, 2015.

=== Anime ===
A 12-episode anime television series adaptation, titled Grenadier: The Senshi of Smiles (グレネーダー 〜ほほえみの閃士〜, Gurenēdā ~Hohoemi no Senshi), produced by Studio Live and Group TAC, and directed by Hiroshi Kōjina, was broadcast on Wowow from October 15, 2004, to January 14, 2005. The opening theme is "Kohaku" and ending theme is "Kanashimi ni Makenaide" (悲しみに負けないで), both performed by Mikuni Shimokawa. When the series was later re-broadcast, opening and ending themes were replaced with "Akatsuki no Sora o Kakeru" (暁ノ空ヲ翔ル) and "Hana no Youni" (花のように) by Hiromi Sato.

In North America, the series was licensed by Media Blasters. The episodes were collected on three DVDs released in 2005. Media Blasters re-released the series on a single Blu-ray set on January 18, 2022.

==== Episodes ====
No.	Title	Original release date
1	"The Smiling Senshi"; Transliteration: "Momoemi no Senshi" (Japanese: ほほえみの閃士)	October 15, 2004
The anime starts with a scene of war: samurai (swordsmen) vs senshi (people that use guns). More than half of the swordsmen get killed. Yajirō Kojima, the leader of the attack orders the retreat while trying to get the senshi attention to facilitate the others escape. While running he`s cornered and injured, then he hides in a hot spring where he meets Rushuna Tendō who claims to be just an ordinary traveler. She saves him from getting caught by the other senshi, then he departs while warning her that this road is dangerous. The second attack over taking back the castle fails as well. Rushuna appears again and saves Yajiro from getting shot then shoots the others, revealing that she is a senshi, a very skilled one. She manages to save the master without killing anyone, as she was taught by a woman revealed at the end of the episode.
2	"Rushuna under Attack"; Transliteration: "Nerawareta Rushuna" (Japanese: 狙われた琉朱菜)	October 22, 2004
3	"Enlightened Evil"; Transliteration: "Ma no Sen" (Japanese: 魔の閃)	October 29, 2004
4	"The Town that does not Smile"; Transliteration: "Warawanai Machi" (Japanese: 笑わない町)	November 5, 2004
5	"Explosion! Kensousen, Kurenai Touka"; Transliteration: "Bakuretsu! Kensōsen. Kurenai Tōka" (Japanese: 爆裂!拳槍閃. 紅桃華)	November 12, 2004
6	"Balloonist, Mikan's Revenge"; Transliteration: "Fūsen Tsukai Mikan no Adauchi" (Japanese: 風船使い みかんの仇討ち)	November 19, 2004
7	"Destination Tento"; Transliteration: "Iza Tento e" (Japanese: いざ、天都へ)	November 26, 2004
8	"An Enemy from the Past, Teppa Aizen"; Transliteration: "Omoide no Teki. Teppa Aizen" (Japanese: 想い出の敵·藍前鉄破)	December 3, 2004
9	"When the Wind Flowers dance" Transliteration: "Kazabana, Mau Toki..." (Japanese: 風花、舞う時...)	December 10, 2004
10	"Entering Tento"; Transliteration: "Tento Iri" (Japanese: 天都入り)	December 17, 2004
11	"Showdown With Tenshi"; Transliteration: "Tenshi to no Taiketsu" (Japanese: 天子との対決)	January 7, 2005
12	"Things Learned on the Road"; Transliteration: "Tabi de Mi ni Tsuketa mono" (Japanese: 旅で身につけたもの)	January 14, 2005

== Reception ==
Manga
"If you prefer your action stories free of humor and completely serious then this series isn't for you. But if you like the idea of a skimpily-clad lead female character who reloads her revolver by bouncing six bullets out of her cleavage and loading them into her gun in midair then you should check out this title." — Matthew Alexander, Mania.
"Yes, Rushuna is eye-candy and there are plenty of upskirt shots to keep most otaku happy, but she's also a complete badass with a gun. Hopefully future volumes will develop her character more so this isn't all we have to judge her on." — A. E. Sparrow, IGN.
Anime
"The character of Yajiro is a refreshing change from the typical male sidekick seen in this genre. Rushuna's character is not quite as appealing at the start, but her ties to the underlying main plot, along with the plot itself, have great potential." — Luis Cruz, Mania.
"Well, Rushuna seems to have a penchant for baths and hotsprings, which means nudity of the non-explicit variety. There are also a lot of battles and fights, which does lead to red shirt death and bleeding wounds. Things never get really messy, though, so the show is probably fine for teenagers." — Stig Høgset, T.H.E.M. Anime Reviews.
