= Kiba (TV series) =

2006 television anime

- Kiba key visual, featuring Zed

牙-KIBA-
- Genre: Adventure; Dark fantasy; Isekai
- Created by: Aniplex
- Anime television series
- Directed by: Hiroshi Kōjina
- Produced by: Norio Yamakawa; Naoki Sasada; Eiichi Kamagata
- Written by: Toshiki Inoue; Michiko Yokote
- Music by: Jun Miyake
- Studio: Madhouse (Note: Production assistance (制作協力) for all episodes provided by Studio Live.)
- Licensed by: NA: ADV Films/Upper Deck Entertainment
- Original network: TV Tokyo
- English network: NA: Anime Network; US: Toonami Jetstream
- Original run: April 2, 2006 – March 25, 2007
- Episodes: 51

Kiba (牙-KIBA-; meaning fang, or if divided into Ki-Ba, a spiritual place) is a Japanese anime series produced by Madhouse and Aniplex that began broadcasting on TV Tokyo on April 5, 2006. The series is directed by Hiroshi Kōjina with Upper Deck Japan, a trading card game company, as the main sponsor. The anime has been licensed by Upper Deck USA and produced by ADV Films for North America distribution.

The series is more violent than other trading-card-game-tie-in animations with many characters being killed. According to an interview with the March 2006 issue of Animage, Hiroshi Kōjina, the director, noted that the show "absolutely will not have any plot elements that curry favor to children". The producer also commented that Kiba is not the type of show to put "human drama" on the back burner while concentrating on promotional tie-ins. Kiba aired on Toonami Jetstream from July 14, 2008, to January 21, 2009.

== Plot ==
Zed, a 15-year-old boy who lives in a city called "Calm", is frustrated by his current situation in life; he feels that somewhere out there is a place where he can live more fully. One day, at the invitation of a mysterious wind, he dives into a space-time crevasse (portal), seeking the answers that might be there. Riding on the wind, he is transported to a war-torn world where magic users called "Shard Casters" fight endlessly with each other, using spells in the form of marble-like "Shards". He is transported to a country known as Templar.

With the power of the Shards, the Shard Casters are able to use spells and control monsters called "Spirits". Fascinated by that power, Zed aims to become a Shard Caster. However, he still doesn't know that residing in his body is "Amil Gaoul", a mighty Spirit with the power to influence the world's future. Amil Gaoul is one of the "Key Spirits" that, when together with the other Key Spirits, can destroy or save the world. There are a total of six Key Spirits: Amil Gaoul, Pronimo, Sachura, Monadi, Dynamis and Shadin.

Zed undergoes countless trials in order to find out who he really is and what is most important to him.

== Music ==
Opening themes
Transcription/translation	Artist	Episodes
Sanctuary	Nami Tamaki	1-26
Hakanaku Tsuyoku	Younha	27-51
Ending themes
Very Very	Afromania	1-13
Solar Wind	Snowkel	14-26
STAY GOLD	Limelight	27-39
Sekai no Hate made/Until the end of the World	Kozue Takada	40-51
Insert songs
Nakanaide	Afromania	15
Image songs
Wind of Power / Zed	Hiroyuki Yoshino	n/a
Go Smiler / Roya	Nana Mizuki	n/a
Fate / Zed	Jun Miyake	n/a

=== Kiba Original Soundtrack 1 ===
- CD 1:

1. zed-fate
2. zed-run
3. roya-pas de bourree
4. zymot
5. templer-fear
6. enemy
7. zed-nostalgia
8. zed-intense
9. dawn
10. templer-breeze
11. templer-promenade
12. roya-sentiment
13. noa-intense
14. noa-calmness
15. battle-approach
16. battle-bump
17. battle-chase
18. zed-friends
19. mother
20. shard-blaze
21. shard-battle
22. zed-regret
23. urban
24. zed-journey
25. Sanctuary [TV ver.]
26. Very Very [TV ver.]
27. solar wind [TV ver.]

- CD 2:

1. Wind of Power
2. Go Smiler

=== Kiba Original Soundtrack 2 ===
- Disc 1

1. zed-fate
2. war
3. plot
4. joy
5. scene-forest
6. scene-lake
7. scene-desert
8. underground
9. neotopia
10. roya-romance
11. fanfare
12. roya-destiny
13. noa-friends
14. disaster
15. darkness
16. secret
17. seekers
18. shard-battle ~ perish
19. universe
20. tears
21. anger
22. zed-friends (alternative take)
23. Hakanaku Tsuyoku (TV ver.)
24. STAY GOLD (TV ver.)
25. Sekai no Hate Made (TV ver.)

- Disc 2

1. Mei no Naki Kaze ni Fukarete
2. Kaze no Fuku Basho
