= No Money (novel) =

Japanese light novel series

- Ayase and Kanō of No Money

お金がないっ (Okane ga Nai)
- Genre: Yaoi, Comedy, Drama, Romance
- Light novel

Okane ga Nai
- Written by: Hitoyo Shinozaki
- Illustrated by: Tōru Kousaka
- Published by: Oakla Shuppan; Gentōsha Comics
- Imprint: Eclipse Romance; Lynx Romance
- Original run: June 1999 – October 28, 2016
- Volumes: 9
- Manga
- Written by: Hitoyo Shinozaki
- Illustrated by: Tohru Kousaka
- Published by: Gentōsha Comics
- Magazine: Comic Magazine LYNX
- Original run: 2002 – present
- Volumes: 18
- Original video animation
- Directed by: Makoto Sokuza
- Written by: Hitoyo Shinozaki
- Music by: Tetsuya Kakihara
- Studio: Yricc
- Licensed by: NA: Kitty Media
- Released: February 9, 2007 – June 22, 2007
- Runtime: 25 minutes
- Episodes: 4

No Money (お金がないっ, Okane ga Nai) is a yaoi novel and manga created by Hitoyo Shinozaki and illustrated by Tōru Kousaka. Besides the manga, there are also drama CDs and four OVA's.

== Synopsis ==
Eighteen year old Yukiya Ayase is an orphaned college student. His older cousin, Tetsuo Ishii, has betrayed him, selling him at a sex slave auction in order to settle his heavy debts. Ayase is bought by loan shark Somuku Kanou for 120 million yen.

Kanou does this because he remembers Ayase from 4 years ago, when a 14 year old Ayase helped him when he was injured. Now, Kanou wants to keep Ayase in order to get close to him, but Ayase rejects his efforts. Kanou then uses the 120 million yen debt to force Ayase to stay with him, reminding him that he now belongs to Kanou. As Ayase is still a student and does not have a job, he is forced to sell his body to Kanou to pay off the debt, 500,000 yen every time they have sex.

== Characters ==
Yukiya Ayase (綾瀬 雪弥, Ayase Yukiya)
Voiced by: Ishida Akira (Drama CD) Jun Fukuyama (OVA)

An eighteen-year-old orphan boy who was betrayed by his own cousin, Tetsuo who auctioned him off to settle his own debt. He is bought by Kanou for 120 million yen, and has to pay off the debt by having sex with Kanou for 500,000 yen each time.

Somuku Kanō (狩納 北, Kanō Somuku)
Voiced by: Jūrōta Kosugi

A 26-year-old businessman who runs a financial firm. Four years ago, his father was murdered and he was brutally beaten. He was 'saved' by Ayase when Ayase found him on the street and offered to help. He buys Ayase from an auction for 120 million yen, and pays him 500,000 yen each time they have sex.

Tetsuo Ishii (石井 鉄男, Ishii Tetsuo)
Voiced by: Tetsuya Kakihara

20-year-old Ayase's cousin who auctioned him off to try and repay his debts.

Homare Kuba (久芳 誉, Kuba Homare) and Misao Kuba (久芳 操, Kuba Misao)
Homare Voiced by: Kōji Tsujitani
Misao Voiced by: Wataru Hatano

25-year-old twins who work for Kanou.

Shinobu Someya/Kaoruko Someya (染矢 忍/染矢 薫子, Someya Shinobu/Someya Kaoruko)
Voiced by: Nobuo Tobita

A 24-year-old okama who is Kanou's childhood friend. She owns an okama bar and employs Ayase as a part-time kitchen helper.

Toranosuke Gion (祇園 寅之介, Gion Toranosuke)
Voiced by: Ryōtarō Okiayu

A 22-year-old student who works as a part-time cameraman. Although he addresses Kanou as nii-san (big brother), he is not related to Kanou. He enjoys recording pornographic films and thought Ayase was a girl the first time they met.

Kudo (工藤, Kudo)

A politician who wanted to rape Ayase and make a porn film at it. But he is defeated when Kanou takes his daughter hostage, he is spared from retribution thanks to Ayase.

== Media ==
=== Light Novel ===
No Money Series (お金がないっシリーズ, Okane ga Nai Series) Publication List
Title	Publication Date	ISBN	Notes
No Money (お金がないっ, Okane ga Nai)	June 1999	ISBN 4-7567-1257-6	
No Money (お金がないっ, Okane ga Nai) (Revised Edition)	October 31, 2004	ISBN 4-344-80467-8	New Edition
Only Money (お金しかないっ, Okane shika Nai)	December 1999	ISBN 4-7567-1291-6	
Only Money (お金しかないっ, Okane shika Nai) (Revised Edition)	November 30, 2004	ISBN 4-344-80489-9	New Edition
Can't Buy with Money (お金じゃ買えないっ, Okane ja Kaenai)	September 2000	ISBN 4-7567-1351-3	
Can't Buy with Money (お金じゃ買えないっ, Okane ja Kaenai) (Revised Edition)	December 31, 2004	ISBN 4-344-80500-3	New Edition
Not Enough Money (お金がたりないっ, Okane ga Tarinai)	September 2001	ISBN 4-7567-1425-0	
Not Enough Money (お金がたりないっ, Okane ga Tarinai) (Revised Edition)	January 31, 2005	ISBN 4-344-80515-1	New Edition
Won't Lend Money (お金は貸さないっ, Okane wa Kasanai)	August 31, 2003	ISBN 4-344-80276-4	
It's Not About Money (お金じゃないっ, Okane ja Nai)	May 31, 2005	ISBN 4-344-80564-X	
Can't Solve with Money (お金じゃ解けないっ, Okane ja Tokenai)	January 31, 2007	ISBN 978-4-344-80910-9	
Won't Give Money (お金はあげないっ, Okane wa Agenai)	March 31, 2014	ISBN 978-4-344-83087-5	
Won't Bet Money (お金は賭けないっ, Okane wa Kakenai)	October 28, 2016	ISBN 978-4-344-83830-7	

=== Manga ===
Publication List
No.	Publication Date	ISBN	Notes
1	January 2002	ISBN 4-7567-1418-8	
1 (Revised)	November 22, 2003	ISBN 4-344-80210-1	New Edition
2	February 24, 2003	ISBN 4-344-80211-X	
3	February 24, 2004	ISBN 4-344-80366-3	
4	March 24, 2005	ISBN 4-344-80538-0	
5	January 24, 2006	ISBN 4-344-80695-6	
6	January 24, 2007	ISBN 978-4-344-80904-8	
7	January 24, 2008	ISBN 978-4-344-81194-2	
8	March 24, 2009	ISBN 978-4-344-81595-7	
9	March 23, 2013	ISBN 978-4-344-82768-4	
10	March 24, 2014	ISBN 978-4-344-83075-2	
11	March 24, 2015	ISBN 978-4-344-83388-3	
12	March 24, 2016	ISBN 978-4-344-83672-3	
13	March 24, 2017	ISBN 978-4-344-83951-9	
14	March 24, 2018	ISBN 978-4-344-84185-7	
15	March 22, 2019	ISBN 978-4-344-84423-0	
16	March 24, 2020	ISBN 978-4-344-84629-6	
17	March 24, 2021	ISBN 978-4-344-84825-2	
18	March 24, 2025	ISBN 978-4-344-85575-5	

Special Editions
Title	Authors	Publisher	Publication Date	ISBN	Notes
I Can't Transform (変身できない)	Shinonaki Ichiya (Story), Kousaka Tooru (Art)	Gentosha Comics (BIRZ Comics Links Collection)	March 24, 2011	ISBN 978-4-344-82183-5	
No Money EX (お金がないっ EX)	Shinonaki Ichiya (Story), Kousaka Tooru (Art)	Gentosha Comics (BIRZ Comics Links Collection)	February 24, 2017	ISBN 978-4-344-83830-7	Contains unpublished side stories from the "No Money" series

=== OVA ===
The OVA has been licensed by Media Blasters under their Kitty Media label. It is also available on Bandai Channel.

No.	Title	Directed by	Written by	Original release date
OVA–1	TBA	Unknown	Unknown	February 9, 2007
OVA–2	TBA	Unknown	Unknown	June 22, 2007
OVA–3	TBA	Unknown	Unknown	September 26, 2007
OVA–4	TBA	Unknown	Unknown	June 22, 2007

=== Music ===
The opening theme of the anime is "Romance Way" by ISSEI. The closing theme is "Itoshii Hito yo Eien ni Nukumori o Tsutaete..." (愛しい人よ永遠に 温もりを伝えて…) performed by Tetsuya Kakihara and Wataru Hatano.
