= Pluster World =

Television series

冒険遊記プラスターワールド (Bōken Yūki Purasutā Wārudo)
- Genre: Adventure, Science fiction
- Anime television series
- Directed by: Yuji Himaki
- Written by: Sukehiro Tomita
- Music by: Motoi Sakuraba
- Studio: Actas; Brain's Base
- Original network: TV Tokyo
- Original run: April 3, 2003 – March 25, 2004
- Episodes: 52

Pluster World (冒険遊記プラスターワールド, Bōken Yūki Purasutā Wārudo; lit. 'Journey of Adventure: Pluster World') is a Japanese anime television series that originally aired on TV Tokyo from April 2003 to March 2004. It was produced by Nihon Ad Systems.

== Story ==
According to legend, the peaceful Pluster World fell into chaos with the appearance of the Minusters, and in response, all of the Plusters fought alongside the humans, or, more specifically, merging with them in order to become more powerful ("plusting"), and were able to seal away the evil Minusters. The resulting peace was thought to continue forever, with the world once again returning to fruition, but the peace has been shattered again by the reappearance of the Minusters.

Beetma, a Pluster from the Kabuto Tribe, on a journey to become the most powerful Pluster, meets up with Wyburst from the Grip Tribe, as well as a Minus-Beast. Completely overmatched in battle, Beetma accidentally finds himself sent to the world of humans, where he meets an 11-year-old boy named Touma Kaname, hoping for revenge on the Minus-Beast. Wyburst, looking for the legendary Gonggorahgong, eventually joins them on their quest to defeat the Minusters as they meet many other Plusters and journey onward.

== Episode list ==
1. Me + You = Plust On (オレ+おまえ=プラストオン)
2. Legendary + Gongoragon = The Start of an Adventure (伝説+ゴンゴラゴン=冒険の始まり)
3. Underground + Great Flood = P (Plust) Wyburst (地下+大洪水=P(プラスト)ワイバースト)
4. Kamide + Death Demon = Deryi (神出+鬼没=デリィ)
5. Seafloor + Treasure = Great Pirate (海底+お宝=大海賊)
6. Darkness + Roar = Warrior of Fire (暗闇+雄叫び=炎の戦士)
7. P (Plust) Deryi - Deryi = Harnia (P(プラスト)デリィ－デリィ=ハーニア)
8. Emergency + Research = Tankyu (緊急+研究=タンキュー)
9. Enemy + Ally = Warrium (敵+味方=ウォリアム)
10. Feeling + Passing = Plust Off (気持ち+すれちがい=プラストオフ)
11. Sky + Golden Key = P (Plust) Fezard (天空+黄金の鍵=P(プラスト)フェザード)
12. Tragedy + Hatred = P (Plust) Warrium (悲劇+憎悪=P(プラスト)ウォリアム)
13. Discovery + Clash = Castle of Gorago (発見+激突=ゴラゴの城)
14. Great Wish + Fulfillment = P (Plust) Maury (大願+成就=P(プラスト)モーリィ)
15. Deep Sea + Palace = P (Plust) Mashanta (深海+宮殿=P(プラスト)マシャンタ)
16. Circuit x Sand = P (Plust) Gingard (サーキット×砂=P(プラスト)ギンガード)
17. Infiltrate + Disguise = Guidance (潜入+変装=ガイダンス)
18. Hope + Buddy = Unbeaten Feeling (希望+仲間=負けない気持ち)
19. Beetma + Deryi = Really? (ビートマ+デリィ=本当？)
20. Time + Confusion = All Set (時間+混乱=全員集合)
21. Gem + Appearance = Tiger Storm (宝石+出現=トラストーム)
22. Warrium x Gongoragon = Fierce Fight (ウォリアム×ゴンゴラゴン=激闘)
23. Final x Decisive Battle = Gingiragin (最終×決戦=ギンギラギン)
24. Blast + Machine = Pluster Race (爆走+マシン=プラスターレース)
25. Victory + Friendship = Wyburst (優勝+友情=ワイバースト)
26. Battle + Pinch = Beetma EX (バトル+ピンチ=ビートマEX(エクス))
27. Go Home + Surprising = Burning Transfer Student (帰宅+驚がく=燃える転校生)
28. Fear + Robot = Pluster Hunt (恐怖+ロボット=プラスター狩り)
29. Ghost Town + Duel = Badnick (ゴーストタウン+決闘=バドニック)
30. Tankyu + Zaian = Plust Robo (タンキュー+ザイアン=プラストロボ)
31. Rain + Whip = Monster Use (アメ+ムチ=怪物(モンスター)使い)
32. Heart + Destruction = Gigajoules (心頭+滅却=ギガジュール)
33. Sea + King = P (Plust) Poseihorn (海+王様=P(プラスト)ポセイホーン)
34. Flame + Resolution = Varose (炎+決意=ヴァローゼ)
35. Touma + Gun = Great Escape (トウマ+ガン=大脱出)
36. Rainwhip + Airship = Great Explosion (アメドムチ+飛行船=大爆発)
37. Zaian + Escape = Great Pursuit (ザイアン+逃亡=大追跡)
38. Wyburst + Harnia = Great Rescue (ワイバースト+ハーニア=大救出)
39. Rogue + Destruction = Dailand (悪党+破滅=ダイランド)
40. Deryi + Barry = Special (デリィ+バリー=スペシャル)
41. Darkness x Safety = Destruction (闇×セイフティ=壊滅)
42. Maury + Katchin + Great Fight (モーリィ+カッチン=大健闘)
43. Sorrow + Flame = D (Dark) Varose (邪念+火炎=D(ダーク)ヴァローゼ)
44. Stray + Delusion = Big Runaway (迷走+妄想=大暴走)
45. Gun + Varose = Resurrection of Fire (ガン+ヴァローゼ=炎の復活)
46. Baddle! + Fatal? = Great Battle!? (バッドル!+やっとる?=大バトル!?)
47. D Mōryi + D Mōryi = D Mōryi (Dモーリィ+Dモーリィ=Dモーリィ)
48. Deryi + Katchin = Outdoor Bath (デリィ+カッチン=露天風呂)
49. Hero + Enter = Mighty V (勇者+登場=マイティV)
50. Touma ÷ Beetma = ? (トウマ÷ビートマ=？)
51. Giant Statue + Power of Darkness = The End of the World (巨人像+闇の力=世界の終わり)
52. You + I = Goodbye (Plust Off) (おまえ+オレ=さよなら(プラストオフ))
